= Mayor of Manado =

- Wali Kota Manado
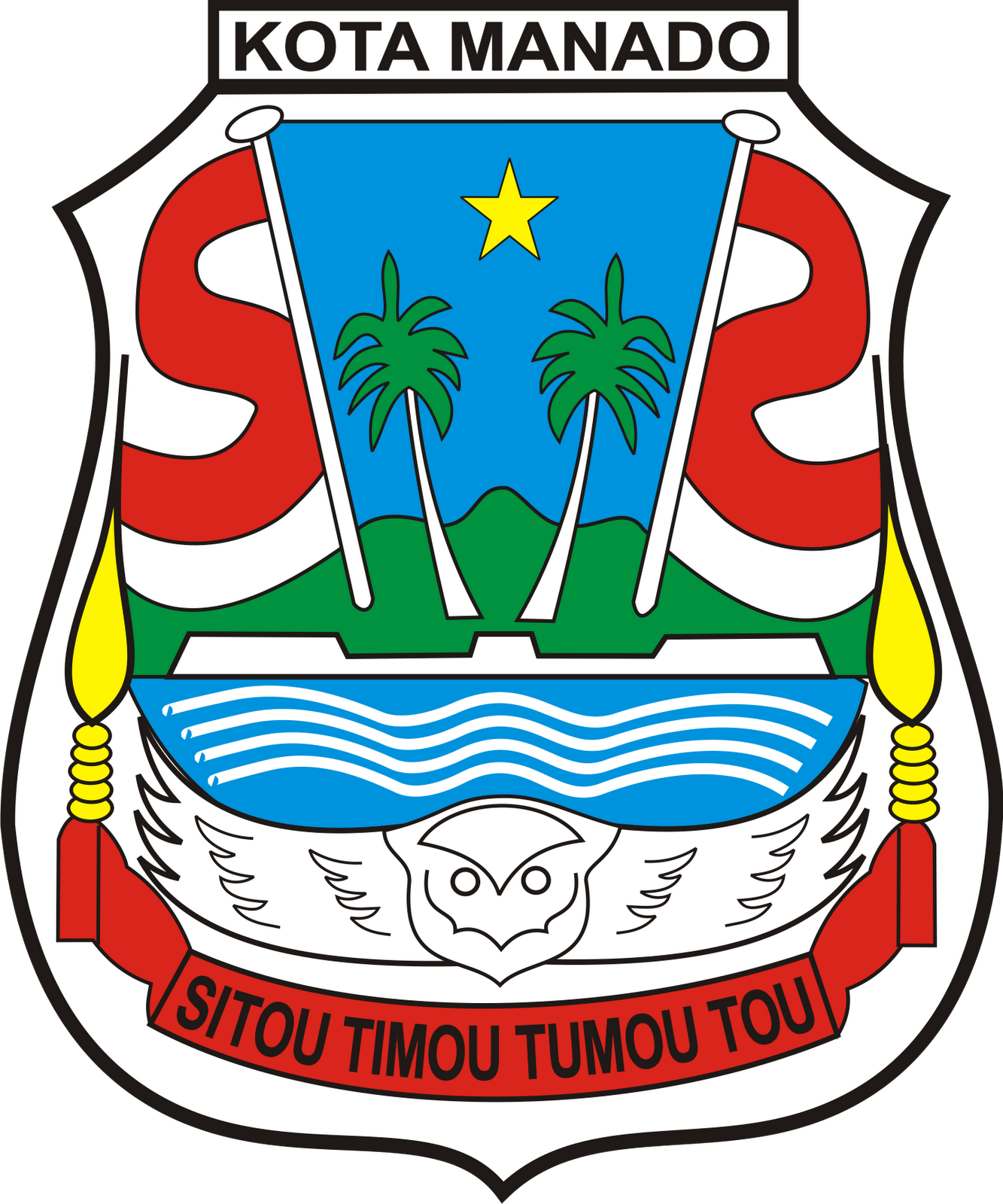
- Coat of arms of Manado

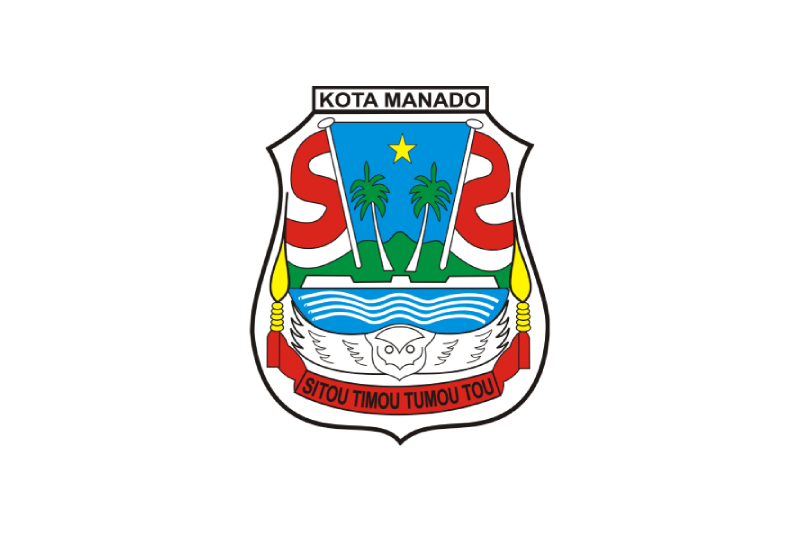
- 120px

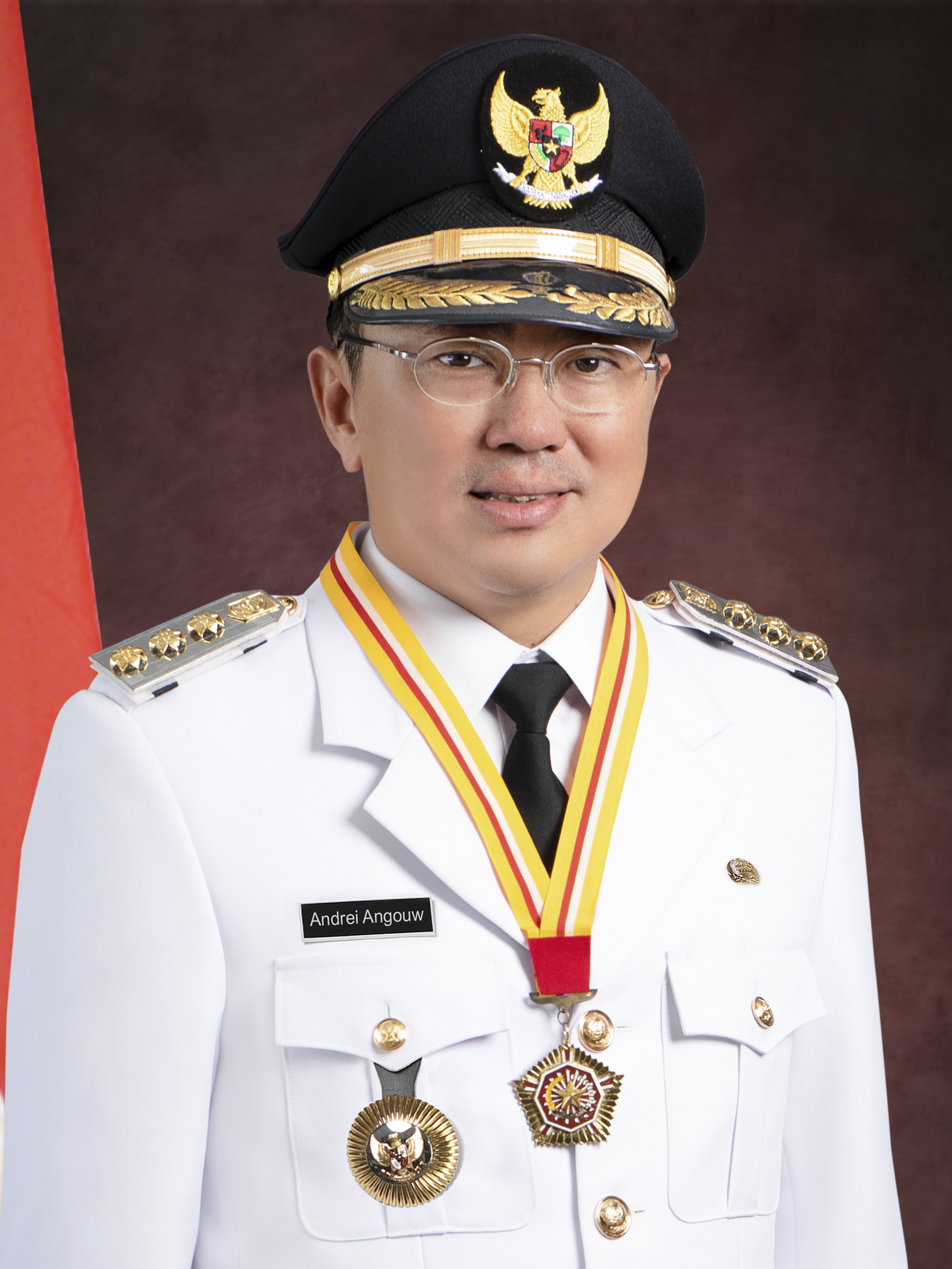
- Incumbent; Andrei Angouw since 20 February 2025
- Term length: 5 years
- Inaugural holder: Frederik Hendrik van de Wetering (Dutch East Indies, 1928); Bernard Wilhelm Lapian (Indonesia, 1945)
- Formation: 1928; 98 years ago
- Website: Official website

Manado, the capital of North Sulawesi province, has a leadership structure that begins with the mayor. In 1928, the position of assistant resident, who previously led the Manado government, was finally changed to mayor. The first mayor was Frederik Hendrik van de Wetering, of Dutch descent. Initially, a mayor could also serve as chairman of the city council, assisted by an assistant mayor elected by popular vote.

== List ==
The following is a definitive list of Mayors of Manado since 1928 during the Dutch East Indies era until now under the Government of the Republic of Indonesia.

Burgemeester van Manado
Num.	Mayor (Birth–Death)	Portrait	Party	Beginning	End	Term of office	Period	Vice Mayor	Ref.
1	Ds. Frederik Hendrik van de Wetering		Non Party	1928	1933	4–5 years	1 (1928)	Unknown	(Note: The first Burgemeester of Manado)
2	H. F. Brune (1894–1974)		Non Party	1933	1936	2–3 years	2 (1933)	A. B. Andu	
3	Dirk Kapteijn (1894–1945)		Non Party	27 August 1936	1940	3–4 years	3 (1936)	W. M. J. van de Poel (1940–1941)	
4	H. Dallinga		Non Party	1941	1942	0–1 years	4 (1941)	W. M. J. van de Poel (1940–1941)	
マナド市長
Num.	Mayor (Birth–Death)	Portrait	Party	Beginning	End	Term of office	Period	Vice Mayor	Ref.
1	Minori Yanai		Non Party	1942	1943	0–1 years	5	There isn't any	(Note: As Manado Shichō)
2	Suzuki		Non Party	1943	1944	0–1 years	6	There isn't any	
3	K. Ishida		Non Party	1944	1945	0–1 years	7	There isn't any	(Note: As the Kenkanrikan Manado)
4	Albertus B. Waworuntu		Non Party	1945	1945	0 years	8	There isn't any	(Note: As Mayor of Manado before independence)
Mayor of Manado
Num.	Mayor (Birth–Death)	Portrait	Party	Beginning	End	Term of office	Period	Vice Mayor	Ref.
1	Bernard Wilhelm Lapian (1892–1977)		Non Party	1945	1947	1–2 years	9	Unknown	(Note: Mayor during the independence era)
2	Evert Rynhart Samuel Warouw		Non Party	November 1947	30 September 1950	2–3 years	10	Unknown	(Note: Burgemeester of Manado during the NICA era)
3	Augustine Magdalena Waworuntu (1899–1987)		Non Party	30 September 1950	29 March 1951	180 days	11	Unknown	
4	Hendrik Reingardt Ticoalu (1916–1974)		Non Party	29 March 1951	1 March 1952	338 days	12	Unknown	(Note: Mayor of Manado City)
5	Benjamin J. Lapian		Non Party	1 March 1952	1 September 1953	1 year, 184 days	13	Unknown	
6	Jurian Tilu Parera		Non Party	1 September 1953	1 May 1955	1 year, 242 days	14	Unknown	(Note: Mayor of Manado City)
7	Jakin Intan Permata		PSII	1 May 1955	23 September 1958	3 years, 145 days	15	Unknown	(Note: Mayor of Manado (1957-1958))
8	Jan Piet Mongula		Non Party	23 September 1958	1 March 1960	1 year, 160 days	16	Unknown	
9	Fransiscus Walandouw		Non Party	1 March 1960	15 June 1965	5 years, 106 days	17 (1960)	Unknown	(Note: Mayor of Manado Level II Regional Head)
10	Soepani		Non Party	15 June 1965	20 October 1966	1 year, 127 days	18 (1965)	Unknown	
11	Rauf Mo'o		ABRI–AD	20 October 1966	12 March 1971	4 years, 143 days	19 (1966)	Unknown	
12	Johnny Henri Pussung		ABRI–AD	19 April 1971	21 January 1975	3 years, 277 days	20 (1971)	Unknown	
13	Adolf Albert Pelealu		Non Party	23 August 1975	23 August 1985	10 years, 0 days	21 (1975)	Unknown	
13	Adolf Albert Pelealu		Non Party	23 August 1975	23 August 1985	10 years, 0 days	22 (1980)	Unknown	
14	Najoan Habel Eman		Non Party	23 August 1985	23 August 1995	10 years, 0 days	23 (1985)	Unknown	
14	Najoan Habel Eman		Non Party	23 August 1985	23 August 1995	10 years, 0 days	24 (1990)	Unknown	
15	Lucky Harry Korah (born 1952)		Non Party	23 August 1995	23 August 2000	5 years, 0 days	25 (1995)	Unknown	
16	Wempie Frederik		Non Party	23 August 2000	23 August 2005	5 years, 0 days	26 (2000)	Teddy Kumaat	
17	Jimmy Rimba Rogi (born 1954)		Golkar	23 August 2005	22 April 2008	2 years, 243 days	27 (2005)	Abdi Buchari	
18	Vicky Lumentut (born 1959)		Demokrat	8 December 2010	8 December 2015	5 years, 0 days	28 (2010)	Harley Mangindaan	
18	Vicky Lumentut (born 1959)		Nasdem	9 May 2016	9 May 2021	5 years, 0 days	29 (2015)	Mor Dominus Bastiaan	
19	Andrei Angouw (born 1971)		PDI-P	10 May 2021	20 February 2025	3 years, 286 days	30 (2020)	Richard Sualang	
19	Andrei Angouw (born 1971)		PDI-P	20 February 2025	Incumbent	1 year, 226 days	31 (2024)	Richard Sualang	

== Temporary replacement ==
In the government stack, a regional head who submits himself to leave or temporarily resigns from his position to the central government, then the Minister of Home Affairs prepares a replacement who is a bureaucrat in the regional government or even a vice mayor, including when the mayor's position is in a transition period.

Portrait	Mayor	Party	Beginning	End	Duration	Period	Definitive	Ref.
	Markus Hendrik Willem Dotulong (Acting)	Non Party	12 March 1971	19 April 1971	38 days	—	Transition (1971)	
	Hein Victor Worang (1919–1982) (Acting)	ABRI–AD	31 January 1975	23 August 1975	204 days	—	Transition (1975)	
	Abdi Buchari (born 1959) (Acting Officer)	Non Party	22 April 2008	11 August 2009	1 year, 111 days	27 (2005)	Jimmy Rimba Rogi	
	Sinyo Harry Sarundajang (1945–2021) (Acting Officer)	Non Party	11 August 2009	26 April 2010	258 days	27 (2005)	Jimmy Rimba Rogi	
	Robby Mamuaja (Daily executive)	Non Party	26 April 2010	8 December 2010	226 days	27 (2005)	Jimmy Rimba Rogi	
	Royke Octavian Roring (Acting)	Non Party	8 December 2015	9 May 2016	153 days	—	Transition (2015–2016)	
	Micler Curva Samuel Lakat (Daily executive)	Non Party	9 May 2021	10 May 2021	1 day	—	Transition (2021)	
	Clay June Dondokambey (born 1983) (Acting)	Non Party	23 September 2024	23 November 2024	61 days	30 (2020)	Andrei Angouw	

== See also ==
- Manado
- List of incumbent regional heads and deputy regional heads in North Sulawesi
