= 2024 Manado mayoral election =

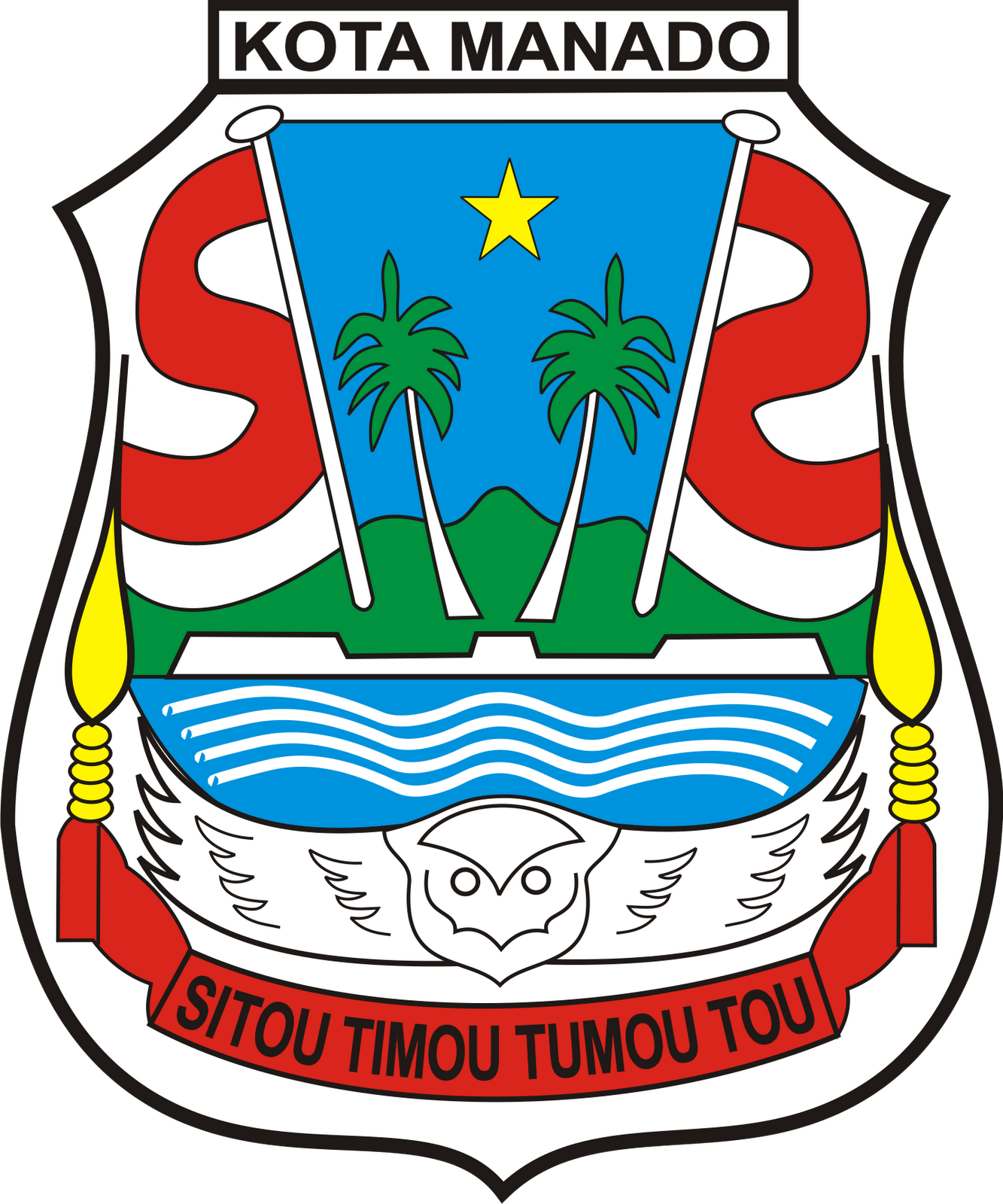
- 27 November 2024
- Turnout: 65.08%
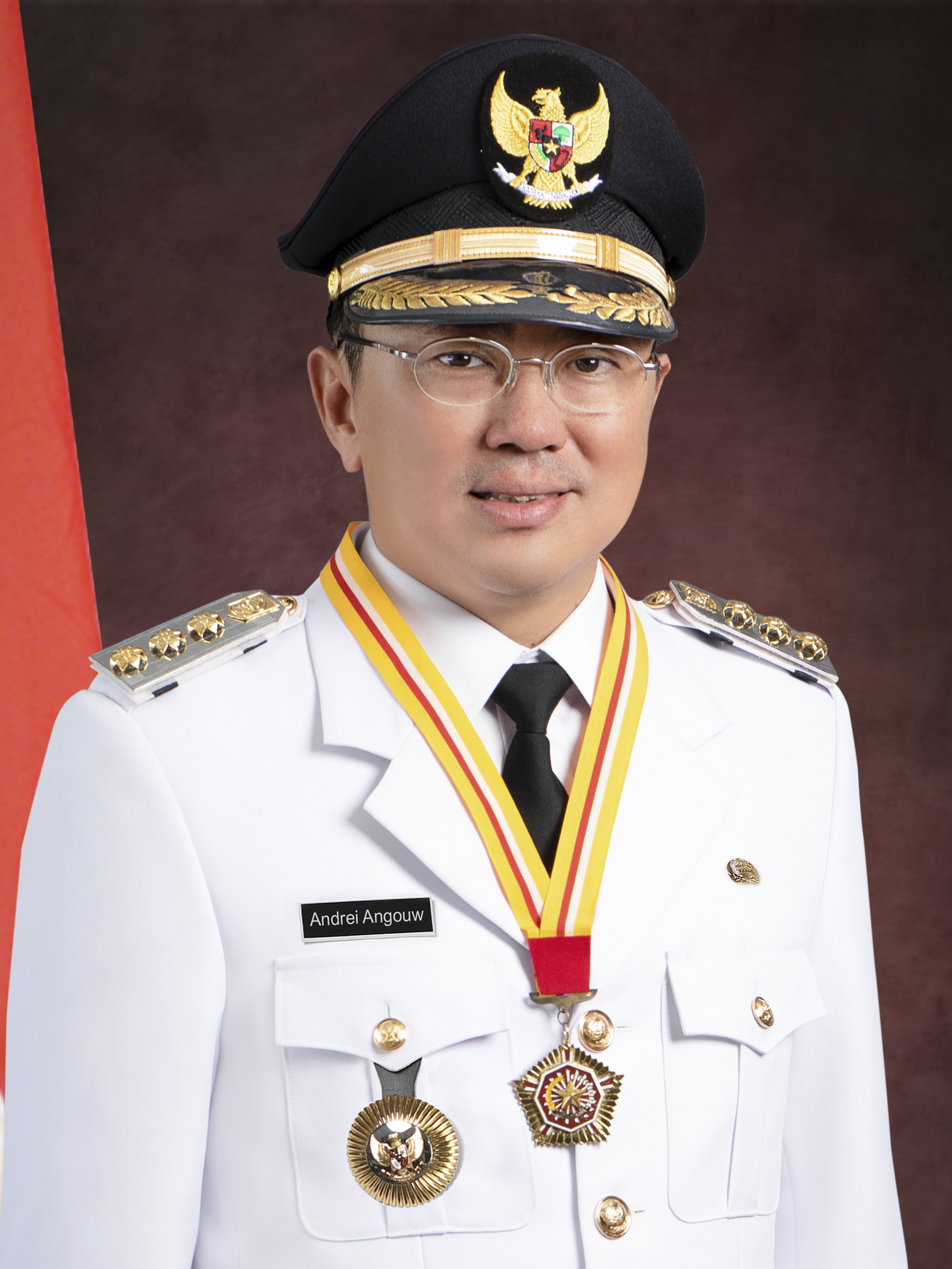

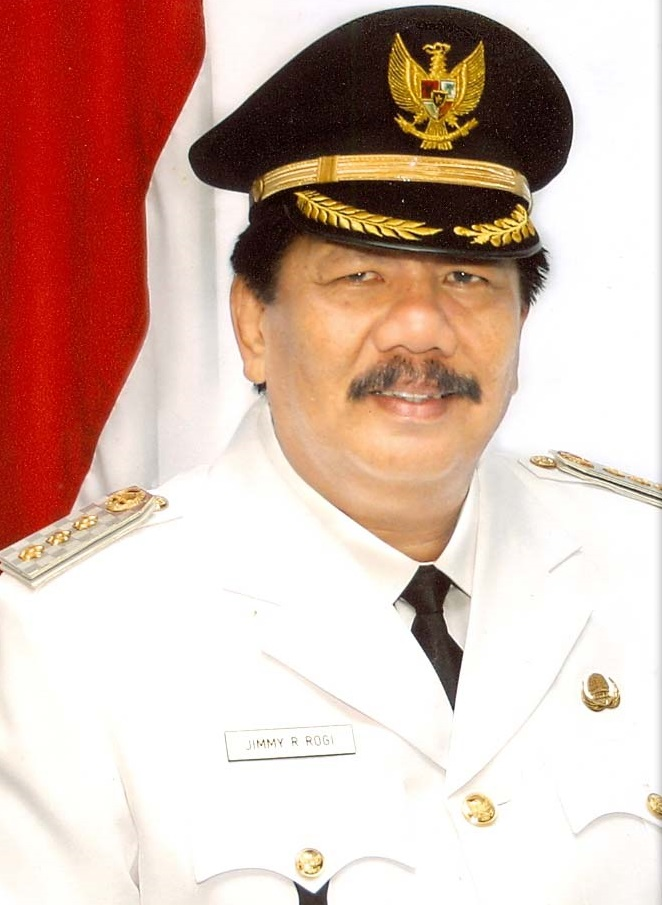

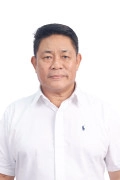
Candidate	Andrei Angouw	Jimmy Rimba Rogi	Benny Parasan
Party	PDI-P	Golkar	Gerindra
Running mate	Richard Sualang	Kristo I.F. Lumentut	Boby Daud
Popular vote	107,285	97,564	12,501
Percentage	48.95%	44.51%	5.70%
- Results by subdistrict
Mayor before election
Andrei Angouw
PDI-P
Elected mayor
Andrei Angouw
PDI-P

The 2024 Manado mayoral election was held on 27 November 2024 as part of nationwide local elections to elect the mayor of Manado, North Sulawesi for a five-year term. The previous election was held in 2020. Incumbent Mayor Andrei Angouw managed to secure re-election to a second term, winning 48% of the vote in a four-way race. Golkar-backed former Mayor Jimmy Rimba Rogi placed second and received 44%.

== Electoral system ==
The election, like other local elections in 2024, follow the first-past-the-post system where the candidate with the most votes wins the election, even if they do not win a majority. It is possible for a candidate to run uncontested, in which case the candidate is still required to win a majority of votes "against" an "empty box" option. Should the candidate fail to do so, the election will be repeated on a later date.

== Candidates ==
According to electoral regulations, in order to qualify for the election, candidates were required to secure support from a political party or a coalition of parties controlling 8 seats (20 percent of all seats) in the Manado Regional House of Representatives (DPRD). The Indonesian Democratic Party of Struggle, which won 16 of 40 seats in the 2024 legislative election, is the only party eligible to nominate a mayoral candidate without forming a coalition with other parties. Candidates may alternatively demonstrate support to run as an independent in form of photocopies of identity cards, which in Manado's case corresponds to 30,033 copies. No independent candidates registered with the General Elections Commission (KPU) prior to the set deadline.

=== Potential ===
The following are individuals who have either been publicly mentioned as a potential candidate by a political party in the DPRD, publicly declared their candidacy with press coverage, or considered as a potential candidate by media outlets:

- Andrei Angouw (PDI-P), incumbent mayor.

- Richard Sualang (PDI-P), incumbent vice mayor (as running mate).

- Jimmy Rimba Rogi, former mayor of Manado (2005–2008).
- Hillary Brigitta Lasut (Demokrat), member of the House of Representatives.
- Jusak Kereh (Gerindra), media businessman.
- Jacobus Ronald Mawuntu, professor at Sam Ratulangi University.

== Political map ==
Following the 2024 Indonesian legislative election, nine political parties are represented in the Manado DPRD:

Political parties	Seat count
Indonesian Democratic Party of Struggle (PDI-P)	16 / 40
Great Indonesia Movement Party (Gerindra)	6 / 40
Party of Functional Groups (Golkar)	5 / 40
Democratic Party (Demokrat)	5 / 40
NasDem Party	2 / 40
Prosperous Justice Party (PKS)	2 / 40
Perindo Party	2 / 40
National Mandate Party (PAN)	1 / 40
Indonesian Solidarity Party (PSI)	1 / 40

== Results ==
Candidate	Running mate	Party	Votes	%
Andrei Angouw	Richard Sualang	Indonesian Democratic Party of Struggle	107,285	48.95
Jimmy Rimba Rogi	Kristo I.F. Lumentut	Golkar	97,564	44.51
Benny Parasan	Boby Daud	Gerindra Party	12,501	5.70
Audy Karamoy	Lucky Datau	Democratic Party	1,839	0.84
Total			219,189	100.00
Valid votes			219,189	98.33
Invalid/blank votes			3,730	1.67
Total votes			222,919	100.00
Registered voters/turnout			342,542	65.08
Source: Manado KPU
