= Soediro =

Indonesian politician

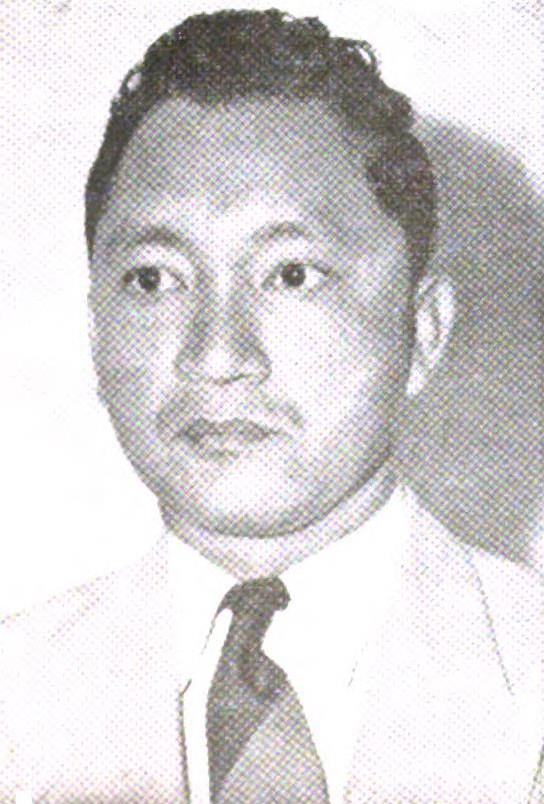

3rd Mayor of Jakarta
- In office 8 December 1953 – 29 January 1960
- Preceded by: Sjamsuridjal
- Succeeded by: Soemarno Sosroatmodjo (as Governor)

Governor of Sulawesi
- In office 1951–1953
- Preceded by: Sam Ratulangi; B. W, Lapian (acting)
- Succeeded by: Lanto Daeng Pasewang

Personal details
- Born: 24 April 1911 Yogyakarta, Dutch East Indies
- Died: 18 April 1992 (aged 80) Jakarta, Indonesia

Raden Soediro (24 April 1911 – 18 April 1992) was an Indonesian politician who served as the first Governor of Jakarta, between 1958 and 1960. Prior to becoming Governor, Soediro served as Jakarta's mayor for five years until the city was made its own special capital region. Soediro was also Governor of Sulawesi between 1951 and 1953.

== Career ==
Soediro was educated in a teachers' training school. Before Indonesia's independence, Soediro was active in various nationalist organizations such as the Jong Java and Partai Indonesia. He was also active in education, becoming the head of a Meer Uitgebreid Lager Onderwijs (Junior High School) between 1931 and 1933, and later he chaired Taman Siswa in Madiun between 1933 and 1936. Between 1936 and 1937, he was assistant to Ernest Douwes Dekker.

During the Japanese occupation of the Dutch East Indies, Soediro became one of the leaders of the Barisan Pelopor, a militant arm of the Japan-formed Jawa Hokokai. Shortly after the Indonesian proclamation of independence in 1945, Soediro decided to acquire a luxury car for Sukarno. His plan was to steal a Buick limousine belonging to the Japanese Chief of Railways, which he believed to be the best car in Jakarta. Soediro approached the Japanese official's driver, whom he knew, and convinced the driver to aid in the theft by handing over the keys and returning to his hometown. However, neither Soediro nor his group knew how to drive. Also in 1945, he became a member of the newly refounded Indonesian National Party. He also became one of the leaders of the Barisan Banteng, the successor to the Barisan Pelopor.

Soediro became the Deputy Resident of Surakarta in 1946 and later the Resident between 1947 and 1950 (as Military Resident since 1948), and then Resident of Madiun between 1950 and 1951. Between 1951 and 1953, he was the Governor of Sulawesi. He was sworn into office in July 1951, and during his time he set up administrative regions in Sulawesi, such as dividing Central Sulawesi into Palu and Donggala administrative regions.

During his time in various offices, Soediro also became a member of the Constitutional Assembly of Indonesia which attempted to form a new constitution.

=== Jakarta ===
Soediro was then assigned as Mayor of Jakarta in December 1953, replacing the Masyumi Party member Sjamsuridjal. Shortly after his appointment, in January 1954 he reorganized the city's local electoral committees, which resulted in large protests. Under Soediro's administration, Jakarta's growth necessitated its division into three administrative cities – North Jakarta, Central Jakarta, and South Jakarta. By 1958, Soediro's position was elevated to that of a governor as Jakarta was elevated to a province.

His administration saw the preparation for the construction of the Istiqlal Mosque and Hotel Indonesia, and despite little success, Soediro fought for the conservation of both Jakarta's electric tram and historical sites. Soediro also implemented a new system of administrative units based on the 1940s Japanese administration, implementing the rukun tetangga and rukun warga systems to administer the city at neighborhood and block levels.

Throughout his term, Soediro encountered significant intervention from President Sukarno. As an example, elementary education was briefly made free by his administration in 1957, but a year later the policy was overridden by the central government. In December 1959, Soediro opted to not run for the governorship and he was replaced by Soemarno Sosroatmodjo. After his retirement from politics, he continued to work as an educator. He died on 18 April 1992.

== Family ==
Soediro was married to Siti Djauhari Soediro. They had 5 children, 3 sons and 2 daughters. One of their grandchildren, Tora Sudiro, is a film director.
