= List of incumbent regional heads and deputy regional heads in North Sulawesi =

The following is an article about the list of Regional Heads and Deputy Regional Heads in 15 regencies/cities in North Sulawesi who are currently still serving.

== List ==
Regency/ City	Photo of the Regent/ Mayor	Regent/ Mayor	Photo of Deputy Regent/ Mayor	Deputy Regent/ Mayor	Taking Office	End of Office (Planned)	Ref.
Bolaang Mongondow; Regency List of Regents/Deputy Regents		Yusra Alhabsyi		Dony Lumenta	20 February 2025	20 February 2030	
South Bolaang Mongondow; Regency List of Regents/Deputy Regents		Iskandar Kamaru		Deddy Abdul Hamid	20 February 2025	20 February 2030	
East Bolaang Mongondow; Regency List of Regents/Deputy Regents		Oskar Manoppo		Argo Vinsensius Sumaiku	20 February 2025	20 February 2030	
North Bolaang Mongondow; Regency List of Regents/Deputy Regents		Sirajudin Lasena		Mohammad Aditya Pontoh	20 February 2025	20 February 2030	
Sangihe Islands; Regency List of Regents/Deputy Regents		Michael Thungari		Tendris Bulahari	20 February 2025	20 February 2030	
Siau Tagulandang Biaro Islands; Regency List of Regents/Deputy Regents		Heronimus Makainas (Acting Officer)			11 May 2026	20 February 2030	
Talaud Islands; Regency List of Regents/Deputy Regents		Welly Titah		Anisya Gretsya Bambungan	20 June 2025	20 June 2030	
Minahasa; Regency List of Regents/Deputy Regents		Robby Dondokambey		Vanda Sarundajang	20 February 2025	20 February 2030	
South Minahasa; Regency List of Regents/Deputy Regents		Franky Donny Wongkar		Theodorus Kawatu	20 February 2025	20 February 2030	
Southeast Minahasa; Regency List of Regents/Deputy Regents		Ronald Kandoli		Fredy Tuda	20 February 2025	20 February 2030	
North Minahasa; Regency List of Regents/Deputy Regents		Joune Ganda		Kevin William Lotulung	20 February 2025	20 February 2030	
Bitung; City List of Mayors/Deputy mayors		Hengky Honandar		Randito Maringka	20 February 2025	20 February 2030	
Kotamobagu; City List of Mayors/Deputy mayors		Weny Gaib		Rendy V. Mangkat	20 February 2025	20 February 2030	
Manado; City List of Mayors/Deputy mayors		Andrei Angouw		Richard Sualang	20 February 2025	20 February 2030	
Tomohon; City List of Mayors/Deputy mayors		Caroll Senduk		Sendy Gladys Rumajar	20 February 2025	20 February 2030	

Notes

- "Commencement of office" is the inauguration date at the beginning or during the current term of office. For acting regents/mayors, it is the date of appointment or extension as acting regent/mayor.
- Based on the Constitutional Court decision Number 27/PUU-XXII/2024, the Governor and Deputy Governor, Regent and Deputy Regent, and Mayor and Deputy Mayor elected in 2020 shall serve until the inauguration of the Governor and Deputy Governor, Regent and Deputy Regent, and Mayor and Deputy Mayor elected in the 2024 national simultaneous elections as long as the term of office does not exceed 5 (five) years.

== See also ==
- North Sulawesi
