= Zus Ratulangi =

Member of Central Indonesian National Committee
- Constituency: Sulawesi

Personal details
- Born: Emilia Augustina Ratulangi; 23 July 1922 Bandung, Dutch East Indies
- Died: 15 February 2025 (aged 102) Soest, Netherlands
- Spouse: Wim Pangalila
- Children: 2
- Parents: Sam Ratulangi (father); Emilie Suzanne Houtman (mother)
- Education: University of Indonesia; Utrecht University; Leiden University; University of Amsterdam
- Profession: Pediatrician

Emilia Augustina Pangalila Ratulangi (23 July 1922 – 15 February 2025) was an Indonesian-Dutch psychiatrist, pediatrician, politician, and independence activist. She was the daughter of Sam Ratulangi.

== Early life and education ==
Ratulangi was born in Bandung on 23 July 1922, to a Minahasan father and an Indo mother. Her father was Sam Ratulangi, and her mother was Emilie Suzanne Houtman. During her childhood, Sam Ratulangi divorced Emilie, resulting in Ratulangi being raised by her father.

Ratulangi then studied at the Ika Daigaku (now the Faculty of Medicine University of Indonesia). She graduated from the Faculty of Medicine at the University of Indonesia in 1948. After the transfer of sovereignty, Ratulangi took part in the selection test for a U.S. scholarship. Out of 32 applicants, only three were accepted, including Ratulangi. She received a two-year United States scholarship.

After receiving the scholarship, she moved to the United States. Upon arrival, her Indonesian diploma was not recognized, and she had to enroll in a graduate program at Miles College, which was not aligned with her educational background. However, with the help of USCIS and her skills in swimming and tennis, she was eventually accepted into a residency program at the Langley Porter Clinic. This clinic was part of the School of Medicine at the University of California, San Francisco. While studying in the U.S., Ratulangi often gave presentations about Indonesia and participated in a major University of California meeting attended by Ali Sastroamidjojo.

In 1952, Ratulangi was in New York and wanted to return to Indonesia. There, she met Indonesian higher education figures who advised her to continue her specialization studies in the Netherlands. Ratulangi accepted their advice and moved to the Netherlands. Upon arrival, she initially faced difficulties in getting her degree recognized. However, with the help of Prof. Rumke from Utrecht University, the issue was resolved. She then earned a doctoral degree from the Utrecht University. She then studied at Leiden University, specializing in child psychiatry, and graduated in 1959. She also earned a professorship from the University of Amsterdam in 1962.

== Activism and politics ==
While studying at Ika Daigaku, Ratulangi was also involved in activism advocating for Indonesia's independence. She successfully led the Minahasa Youth Movement not to support Japan during World War II. She also participated in a youth congress at Villa Isola, which resulted in a major demand: Indonesia's independence. Ratulangi acted as a liaison between the Chairman of the Christian Student Association, Oscar Engelen, and Sam Ratulangi when the Jakarta Charter was released, which arose controversy in its first preamble. After the establishment of the Preparatory Committee for Indonesian Independence (PPKI), she was involved in determining the number of Sulawesi's delegations in the organization as a youth representative. On 14 August 1945, Ratulangi led a group of students to secure Sulawesi's PPKI delegates at Jalan Prapatan No. 10, aiming to persuade Soekarno to immediately proclaim independence.

After the proclamation of independence, Ratulangi entered politics by joining the Indonesian People's Service Sulawesi (KRIS) and becoming a member of KNIP. She became the youngest KNIP member. She was also one of the key figures behind the establishment of the Proclamation Monument, playing a role in fundraising for its construction. Additionally, along with Setiati, she was appointed by Soekarno as a member of Pemuda Puteri Indonesia (PPI) as a youth representative. In 1947, she moved to Jakarta and was appointed the leader of the Jakarta Student Association (PMD).

== Career ==
=== Medicine ===
As a medical student, she and her university colleagues provided healthcare services to rōmusha workers in Bayah with limited medicines and equipment. After the proclamation of independence, Ratulangi joined the Indonesian Red Cross (PMI) and actively participated in its development.

After graduating, she worked as a child psychiatrist in Amsterdam and also served as the Head of the Children's Department at the University of Amsterdam and the Head of the Epilepsy Department at the Koningin Emma Institute. She was also known as an expert in psychiatry and neurology.

=== Others ===
While Sam Ratulangi was in exile, Ratulangi was responsible for financing the education of her younger siblings. She worked as an assistant to the Head of the U.S. Information Services Library in Jakarta.

== Personal life and death ==
Ratulangi married a shipbuilding engineer, Wim Pangalila, in 1954. They had two children, a son and a daughter.

Ratulangi died in Soest on 15 February 2025 at the age of 102. Her body is planned to be cremated, and the ashes will be taken to Tondano.

== Bibliography ==
- Masjkuri, Masjkuri (1985). DR. GSSJ. RATULANGI. Jakarta: Departemen Pendidikan dan Kebudayaan.
