= List of governors of Sulawesi =

The province of Sulawesi was a province in Indonesia that was established after the Proclamation of Indonesian Independence in 1945. It was separated into the province of North and Central Sulawesi and the province of South and Southeast Sulawesi in 1960.

== Governors of Sulawesi ==
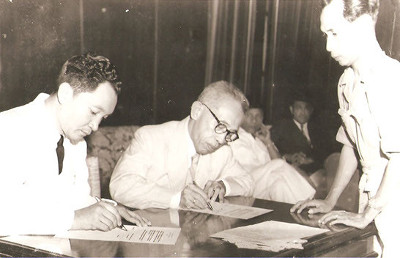
Transfer of office from B.W. Lapian to Sudiro in July 1951

| # | Photo | Name | Took office | Left office | Notes |
|---|---|---|---|---|---|
| 1 | | Sam Ratulangi | 1945 | 1949 | |
| – | | Bernard Wilhelm Lapian | 1950 | 1951 | Acting governor |
| 2 | | Raden Sudiro | 1951 | 1953 | |
| – | | Andi Burhanuddin | 1953 | 1953 | Acting governor |
| 3 | | Lanto Daeng Pasewang | 1953 | 1956 | |
| 4 | | Andi Pangerang Petta Rani | 1956 | 1960 | |
