= Blue Choir of Sam Ratulangi University =

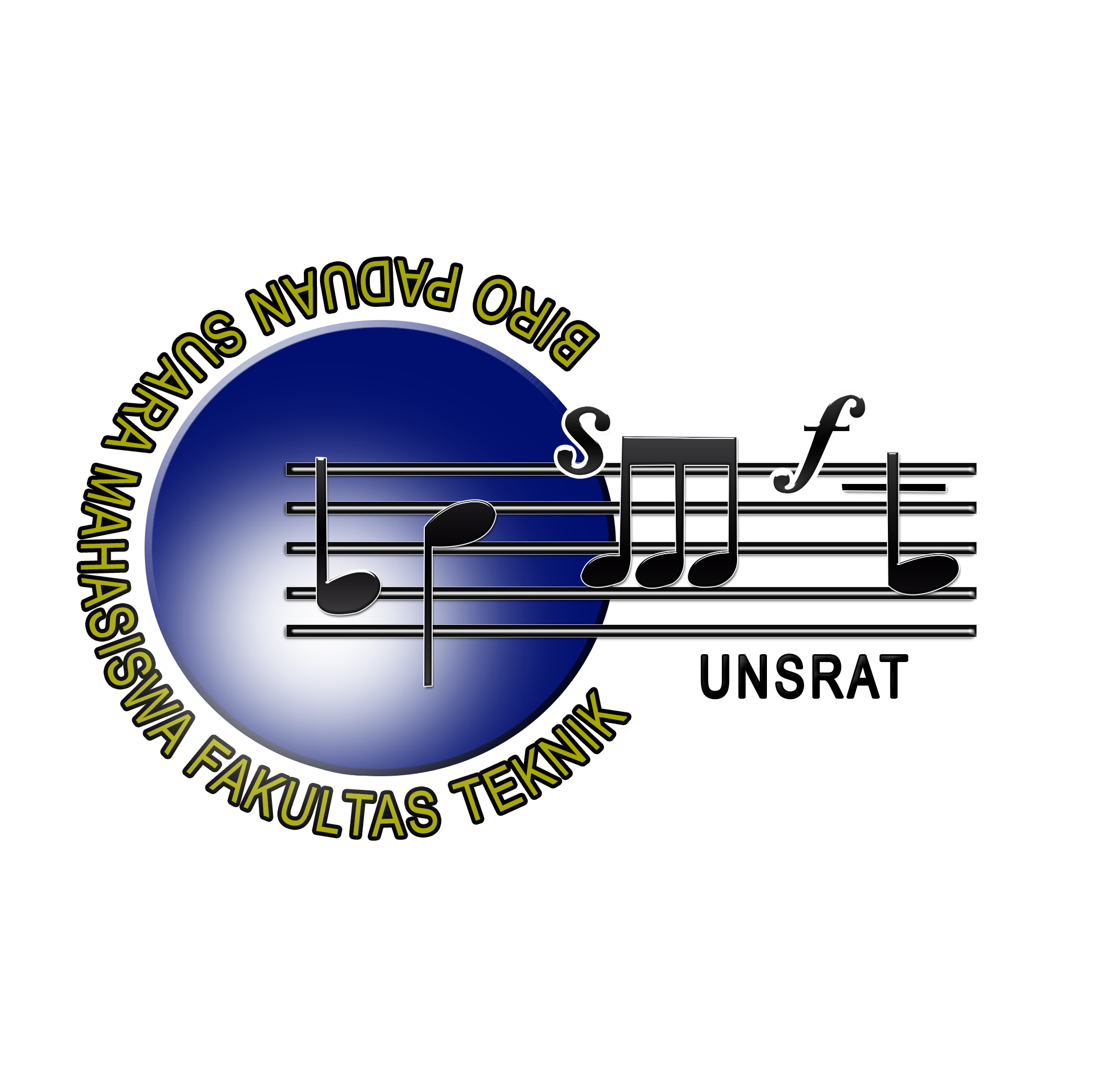

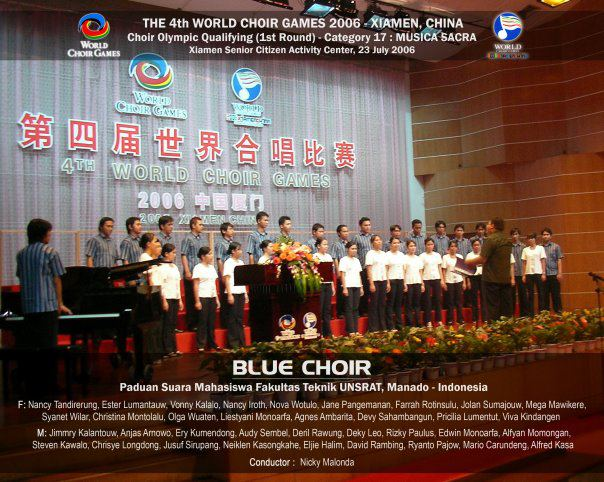
- 2006 World Choir Games group photo
- Founded: September 27, 1996 (age 29)
- Type: Students Choir
- Location: Sam Ratulangi University

The Blue Choir of Sam Ratulangi University is a students choir of Indonesia that consists of around 50 singers selected from full-time engineering students at Sam Ratulangi University. Between auditions, each new choir meets around six times to learn new repertoire, tour both urban and rural parts of North Sulawesi, provide choral workshops for schools and to tour internationally. The choir has received international attention and critical acclaim from overseas audiences but limited publicity in Indonesia itself. Their repertoire, although widely varied in style, age and language, specifically emphasises works by Indonesian composers and music from Asia Pacific and other cultures. Performances by the choir regularly include commissioned works showcasing these uniquely North Sulawesi and Indonesian traditions.

== History ==
Blue Choir was founded in 1989 with the name "The Bureau of Students Choir, Engineering Faculty", and legally became a student organization of the Faculty of Engineering, Sam Ratulangi University September 27, 1996, and began to use the name of "Blue Choir" in 1999. The choir presently has about 60 singers from four majors including civil engineering, architecture, mechanical engineering and electrical engineering with informatics joined in 2007 then urban planning joined in 2008 and they perform an extensive repertoire from Latin works to Contemporary Asian and Western song. The choir also occasionally participates in national and international choir competition and hold concerts in various churches the whole year. Nowadays, Blue Choir has renowned as one of the best choir in North Sulawesi.

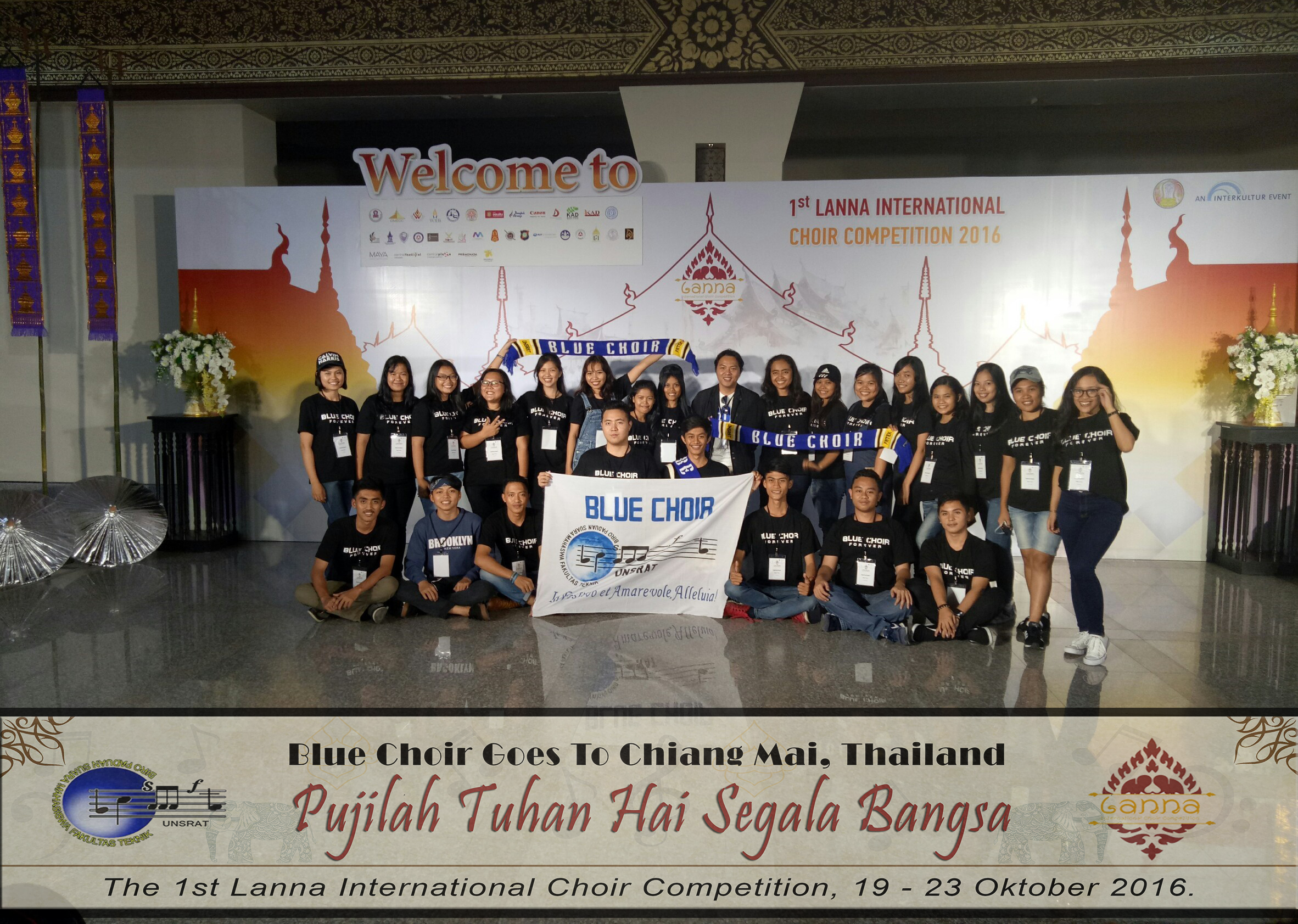
The Blue Choir at The 1st Lanna International Choir Competition, Chiang Mai, Thailand in 2016

== Achievements ==
Year	Competition	Category	Award	Location
2002	18th ITB Choir Festivals	University & Public Mixed Choirs	Successfully Participants (1st Round)	Bandung, Indonesia
2004	19th ITB Choir Festivals	University& Public Mixed Choirs	6th Placed (Silver Diploma)	Bandung, Indonesia
2005	Male Competition "Yudea Bermazmur"	Male Choirs	1st Prize	Manado, Indonesia
2006	4th World Choir Games	Musica Sacra	Golden Diploma (1st Round), Silver Medal (2nd Round)	Xiamen, People's Republic of China
2006	4th World Choir Games	Gospel & Spiritual	Silver Diploma (1st Round)	Xiamen, People's Republic of China
2007	Held a "Christmas Concert" collaborated with Manado State University Choir			Manado, Indonesia
2008	Genezareth Bermazmur	Mixed Choirs	1st Prize	Bitung, Indonesia
2008	Tomohon Choir Competition	Mixed Choirs	3rd Prize	Tomohon, Indonesia
2009	1st Parahyangan International Chamber Choir Competition	Folklore	8th Prize	Bandung, Indonesia
2009	1st Parahyangan International Chamber Choir Competition	Classic & Art Song	6th Prize	Bandung, Indonesia
2012	23rd ITB Choir Festival	Mixed Choirs	Silver Medal (2nd Round)	Bandung, Indonesia
2012	23rd ITB Choir Festival	Folklore	Silver Medal (2nd Round)	Bandung, Indonesia
2013	3rd Asia Pacific Choir Games	Musica Contemporanea	Category Winner (2nd Round)	Manado, Indonesia
2016	The 1st Lanna International Choir Competition	Folklore	Silver Medal Lever IX	Chiang Mai, Thailand

== Publication of choral works ==
List of Choral Works sung by Blue Choir of Sam Ratulangi University in several competitions and concerts:

Years	Choral Works	Composers	Genre	Language / Origin	Notes
2002	Elegi Kehidupan	Ronald Pohan	Contemporary	Indonesian	
2004	Siluet	Ronald Pohan	Contemporary	Indonesian	
2004	Locus iste	Anton Bruckner	Romantic	Latin	
2004	Set Me As A Seal	Rene Clausen	Contemporary	English	
2004	People Need The Lord	Tom Fettke	Contemporary	English	
2005	Rejoice The Lord Is King	John Purifoy	Contemporary	English	
2005	O magnum mysterium	Morten Lauridsen	Contemporary	Latin	
2006	Doa Bapa Kami (The Lords Prayer)	Perry Rumengan	Contemporary	Indonesian	Premiered
2006	Cantate Domino	Claudio Monteverdi	Renaissance	Latin	
2006	Chillun' Come On Home	Noble Cain	Spiritual	English	
2007	Dumbelle (Rain Chant)	Rodolfo Delarmente	Contemporary, Folk song	Tagalog (Philippines)	
2007	Sing A Song Of Sixpence	John Rutter	Contemporary	English	
2008	Pamugun	Francisco F. Feliciano	Contemporary	Tagalog (Philippines)	
2008	Wade In De Water	Allen Koepke	Spiritual	English	
2008	Timor Et Tremor	Terry Schlenker	Contemporary	Latin	Indonesia's Premiered
2008	Plenty Good Room	Rene Clausen	Jazz	English	Indonesia's Premiered
2008	Ave Maria	Joan Szymko	Contemporary	Latin	
2008	Pencapaian Sejati	Perry Rumengan	Contemporary	Indonesian	Premiered
2008	Noche De Paz	Cesar Carrillo	Hymn	Portuguese	
2009	War Song	Shin’ichirō Ikebe	Contemporary, Folk song	Maori (New Zealand)	
2009	Dung Nene, Dung Tete	Jimmry Kalantouw & Mario Carundeng	Folk song	Minahasa (Indonesia)	
2009	Loquebantur - Variis Linguis	Thomas Tallis	Renaissance	Latin	
2009	Amazing Grace	Eriks Esenvalds	Spiritual	English	Asia's Premiered
2009	Lux Aurumque	Eric Whitacre	Contemporary	Latin	
2010	Kondalilla	Stephen Leek	Contemporary, Folk song	Aborigin (Australia)	
2010	Ov'e Lass', Il Bel Viso?	Morten Lauridsen	Contemporary	Italian	
2011	Yamko Rambe Yamko	Agustinus Bambang Jusana(Arr.)	Contemporary, Folk song	Kemtuk, Gresi, Namblong (Indonesia)	
2011	Ding Dong Merrily On High! (French Traditional)		Christmas Folk song	English	
2012	Ipaphonia	Branko Stark	Contemporary	(undefy)	
2012	Kalejs Kala Debesis	Selga Mence	Contemporary, Folk song	Latvian	
2013	Nascatur Pax	Kentaro Sato	Contemporary	Latin	World's Premiere
2016	Dung Nene', Dung Tete'	Jimmry Kalantow & Mario Carundeng	Folk song	Minahasa (Indonesia)	
2016	Kalwedo Basudarae	Christian Tamaela	Folk song	Ambonese (Indonesia)	
2016	Yamko Rambe Yamko	Agustinus Bambang Jusana	Folk song	Kemtuk, Gresi, Namblong (Indonesia)	
