= Urbanization in Indonesia =

Urbanization in Indonesia increased tremendously following the country's rapid development in the 1970s. Since then, Indonesia has been facing high urbanization rates driven by rural-urban migration. In 1950, 15% of Indonesia's population lived in urban areas. In 1990, 40 years later, this number doubled to 30%. Indonesia took only another 20 years to increase its urban population to 44% as reported in 2010. The Central Statistics Agency (BPS) reported that the average population density of Jakarta, the capital, had reached more than 14,400 people per square kilometer. The BPS also predicted that the population in Jakarta will reach 11 million people in 2020 unless measures are taken to control the population.

== Definition ==
Statistics Indonesia classifies Indonesia's fourth-level administrative divisions into urban or rural settlements according to its population density, economic dependence on agriculture, and access to facilities. Following the definition, the country has 15,785 "urban" subdivisions and 61,340 "rural" subdivisions as of the 2010 census.

== Socio-economic effects ==
Compared to the high intensity of rural-urban migration, most local governments in each province are required to meet the escalating demand for services and infrastructure in terms of housing, transportation, and employment. When these demands are growing at a faster rate than the availability of infrastructure, there is a ‘socio-economic dualism’ observable within urban society in Indonesia.

Socio-economic dualism portrays modernity and ‘kampung (village)’ society co-existing in urban areas. In Central Java, there are 14.1% or 2092500 people whose incomes are below the poverty line. In West Nusa Tenggara, the number of poor people is reported to be 23.7% out of the total urban population. Firman (2000) argues that this socio-economic dualism depicts spatial segregation and socio-economic inequality. According to Theil Index T, inequality in Indonesia's urban cities increased from 0.25 to 0.33 in the period of 1999 to 2002. Without availability of employment catered to the needs of rural-urban migrants, income segregation between rich and poor in urban areas will worsen. This potentially leads to social friction, political tension, as well as discrimination in areas such as education and healthcare. Without proper management and actions taken, the continuous influx or rural-urban migration may pose as a serious threat to the infrastructure in the urban cities. In terms of transportation, for instance, the traffic crisis costs Jakarta $1.4 billion a year due to traffic congestion and public transportation.

== Implications ==
One of the implications of urbanization and development in Indonesia is the changing demographics in the rural areas. According to the United Nations Department of Economics and Social Affairs, the population aged over 60 in Indonesia is expected to rise by 16% by 2050, which indicates the rapidly ageing population in Indonesia.

Secondly, there are more youths moving to cities in search of better employment opportunities now due to urbanization. This leaves behind a large number of the ageing population of Indonesia to live on their own in rural areas. The main source of income for the people in the rural areas comes from agriculture. Statistics from the Agricultural Ministry show that out of the 140 million farmers in the country, 80% of them are aged 45 and above. With men moving out of rural areas in large quantities, there will be insufficient people taking over agricultural practices from the ageing farmers. Many attribute this movement of the youths to the manual and hard labour that is required of them to work on farms. Also, the youths do not want to face the risks of having a bad harvest. This leads to a major concern for the country regarding the agricultural industry. There is a possibility of a food crisis in the near future if production levels are not increased. Ageing farmers continue with their basic and manual methods of farming due to low skills and low education levels. Productivity levels in the agricultural industry is low as a result of this. Vice President Boediono warned that current levels of food production will not be sufficient to balance the increasing population in the near future.

Another problem with rapid urbanization is the fall in investments in rural infrastructure. There are abundant investments in urbanization projects. Populations of people living in urban areas are predicted to increase by more than 65% by 2030. However, after 1980, investments in rural projects began to fall. Transport systems and roads are very critical forms of infrastructure that help in the development of rural areas. Farmers require better roads and a more efficient transport system to be able to access larger markets outside of their villages. Studies show that half of the kabupaten roads, which make up to 72% of the road network, are in poor condition. Moreover, the absence of adequate investments in rural projects further accentuates the rate of migration of youths from villages to cities. Youths do not have a platform for progress in such areas where there are no efforts made to improve their lifestyles.

Healthcare services in rural parts of Indonesia have also worsened with the fall in investments in rural infrastructure. The aged do not have proper and affordable healthcare services which is very essential for them given their age and job as farmers. Statistics show that in East Kalimantan, the number of villages which have a hospital has decreased from 37 in 2005 to 33 in 2008. Also, the number of Puskemas (Public Health Centre) – the health centre which is specifically targeted to the lower income families - in West Java, Central Java, and East Java as well as South and East Kalimantan have decreased from 222 in 2005 to 209 in 2008. Indonesia also suffers from a lack of healthcare professionals such as doctors and nurses. The bulk of them remain in urban areas which has caused a shortage of doctors and nurses in the rural areas. The poor people in rural areas do not have a strong and efficient healthcare system to turn to in times of need.

== See also ==
- Timeline of Jakarta
- List of cities in Indonesia
