= Vicky Lumentut =

Indonesian politician

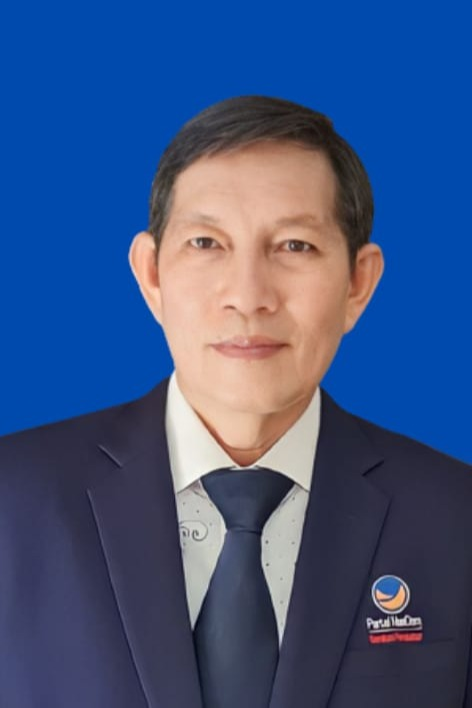

Mayor of Manado
- In office 9 May 2016 – 10 May 2021
- Preceded by: Royke Octavian Roring (act.)
- Succeeded by: Andrei Angouw
- In office 8 December 2010 – 8 December 2015
- Preceded by: Jimmy Rimba Rogi Acting mayors: Abdi Buchari; Sinyo Harry Sarundajang; Robby Mamuaja
- Succeeded by: Royke Octavian Roring (act.)

Personal details
- Born: Godbless Sofcar Vicky Lumentut; 8 June 1959 (age 67) Tondano, Indonesia
- Party: Nasdem
- Education: Sam Ratulangi University; Bogor Agricultural University

Godbless Sofcar Vicky Lumentut (born 8 June 1959) is an Indonesian politician who was the mayor of Manado, the capital of North Sulawesi.

Before he was elected mayor, he had been a civil servant for nearly twenty years, and was the city secretary of Manado for five years. Formerly a member of the Democratic Party, he moved to Nasdem in 2018.

== Background ==
Lumentut was born in Tondano, Minahasa Regency on 8 June 1959. After completing his elementary and middle schools there, he went to a trade school in Manado, and graduated from Sam Ratulangi University's civil engineering program in 1985. Later on, Lumentut would get a second bachelor's degree from Sam Ratulangi in law. He also studied rural development in Bogor Agricultural University, management in a Jakartan economic institute.

He is married to J.P.A. Runtuwene and the couple has four children.

== Career ==
=== Civil servant ===
He began working at the province's government in 1986, and was appointed a head of subdepartment the following year. He initially worked in its development division. He became the head of water resources by 2003, and was appointed as Manado's city secretary in 2005.

=== Politics ===
After winning the city's mayoral election in 2010, and its revote, Lumentut was sworn in as mayor on 8 December 2010. His first term ended on 8 December 2015, but he was sworn in again on 9 May 2016 after winning the 2016 mayoral election in February 2016.

As mayor, he established a "Manado Smart City" program, which involved setting up a command center and a variety of applications. Between 2010 and 2015, the city's budget and income increased by more than twofold, with a health insurance for all residents and establishment of paid neighborhood leader positions. He also launched a car free day for the city in 2016. In 2017, Tempo awarded him with an "Attractiveness Award" for the city's appeal to investors and businesses.

He was dishonorably discharged from Demokrat in 2018, when a video of him attending a legislative candidate briefing for Nasdem circulated. At that point, he was the leader of Demokrat's North Sulawesi provincial branch, having served in that position since 2011 and for a second term since 2016. His former party accused Lumentut of having been pressured by the Supreme Court to join Nasdem, as he was being investigated on corruption charges.
