= Panus Bridge =

Coordinates: 6.400387071424457°S 106.83138973099823°E

Panus Bridge (Indonesian: Jembatan Panus) is a bridge over the Ciliwung river in Depok, West Java, Indonesia, which connected Bogor and Batavia in the Dutch period in Indonesia in order for people from Depok to be able to work in Jakarta.
