= Suwiryo =

Indonesian politician (1903–1967)

Raden Suwiryo
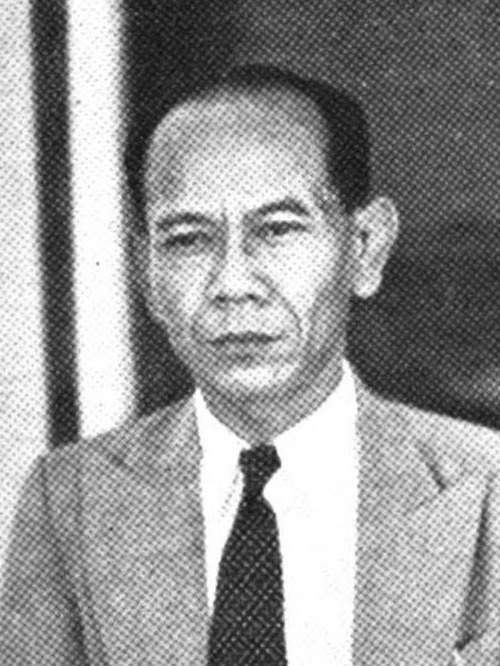
- Official portrait, c. 1954

6th Chairman of the Indonesian National Party
- In office 28 July 1956 – 29 July 1960
- Preceded by: Sidik Djojosukarto
- Succeeded by: Ali Sastroamidjojo

5th Deputy Prime Minister of Indonesia
- In office 6 September 1950 – 27 April 1951
- Prime Minister: Soekiman Wirjosandjojo
- Preceded by: Hamengkubuwono IX
- Succeeded by: Prawoto Mangkusasmito

1st Mayor of Jakarta
- In office 30 March 1950 – 2 May 1951
- Preceded by: Hilman Djajadiningrat (as Governor of the Federal Region of Batavia)
- Succeeded by: Sjamsuridjal
- In office 23 September 1945 – November 1947
- Preceded by: Position established
- Succeeded by: Elbert Marinus Stok (as Dutch Mayors of Jakarta/Batavia)

Personal details
- Born: Suwiryo; 17 February 1903 Wonogiri, Dutch East Indies
- Died: 27 August 1967 (aged 64) Bandung, Indonesia
- Resting place: Kalibata Heroes' Cemetery
- Party: Indonesian National Party
- Occupation: Politician

Suwiryo (EVO: Soewirjo; 17 February 1903 – 27 August 1967) was an Indonesian politician. He served as the first Mayor of Jakarta following the proclamation of Indonesian independence from 1945 until 1947 and again from 1950 until 1951. Additionally, he served as Deputy Prime Minister of Indonesia under Prime Minister Soekiman Wirjosandjojo from 1951 until 1952. A member of the Indonesian National Party, he was also the party's sixth chairman, serving from 1956 until his ousting by Ali Sastroamidjojo in 1960.

== Early life ==
Suwiryo was born in Wonogiri, Dutch East Indies (now Indonesia), on 17 February 1903. After completing his education, he worked at the central statistical body, became a teacher, worked at an insurance company, and founded a pharmaceutical business. He became a participant in the Indonesian National Party, and upon its dissolution in 1931, was one of the co-founders of the succeeding Indonesia Party. During the Japanese occupation of the Dutch East Indies, Suwiryo worked as head of economic affairs at the headquarters of the Japan-founded labor organization Putera before later working at Jawa Hokokai. In 1945, he became a deputy mayor of Jakarta under Japanese mayor Hasegawa Shigeo. Following the surrender of Japan, a group of Indonesian officials approached Hasegawa and requested him to hand over power peacefully to Suwiryo on 7 September 1945. Though he refused the demand, Hasegawa stopped attending office, resulting in Suwiryo becoming de facto mayor.

== Political career ==
=== Mayor of Jakarta ===
Suwiryo was elected by municipal employees of Jakarta's government as the new mayor on 23 September 1945. During the early parts of the Indonesian National Revolution, Suwiryo continued to lead the city administration of Jakarta despite the military occupation of the Allied forces. He also joined a committee that was meant to establish cooperation between the Indonesian police forces and the British military. During this period, there was competition between the authorities established by the Dutch East Indies government and the Republican government, though in general the former focused on European affairs and the latter focused on the Indonesian inhabitants.

Suwiryo was arrested by Dutch forces alongside some other Republican administrators on 20 July 1947, shortly before Operation Product. After being arrested for several months, Suwiryo was flown to Yogyakarta - the Republic of Indonesia's new capital - in November 1947 and he became head of demographic affairs of the government, with Daan Jahja becoming the military governor of Jakarta.

Following his reappointment as mayor by Sukarno on 17 February 1950 during the United States of Indonesia period, Suwiryo began developing Jakarta as a metropolitan city, through the development of new areas and issuance of some regulations. In 1951, he was appointed as Deputy Prime Minister and left the office, which was briefly vacant until Suwiryo was succeeded by Syamsurizal.

=== Later career ===
After his time as deputy prime minister, Suwiryo worked at the Ministry of Home Affairs for some time, and became head of several state-owned banks such as Bank Industri Negara in 1953, in addition to joining the Constitutional Assembly of Indonesia. In the Indonesian National Party's July 1956 congress, he was elected party chairman following a narrow victory over Ki Sarmidi Mangunsarkoro. Under Suwiryo's tenure, the PNI underwent a decline and it lost ground to the Indonesian Communist Party in the provincial elections of 1957, while the party's leadership remained indecisive regarding the party's position on the increased political powers of the army and Sukarno's anti-parliamentary drive.

Suwiryo was often criticized by senior pro-parliamentary PNI members such as Sartono and Iskaq Tjokrohadisurjo for his compromises with Sukarno. This eventually led to the fracturing of PNI's unity in its provincial branches, several members broke off and formed Partindo, and multiple army-backed PNI-affiliated organizations challenged Suwiryo's chairmanship. Suwiryo was defeated by Ali Sastroamidjojo in the chairman vote during the July 1960 party congress.

=== Death ===
He died on 27 August 1967 and was buried in Kalibata Heroes' Cemetery.
