= Hillary Brigitta Lasut =

Indonesian politician (born 1996)

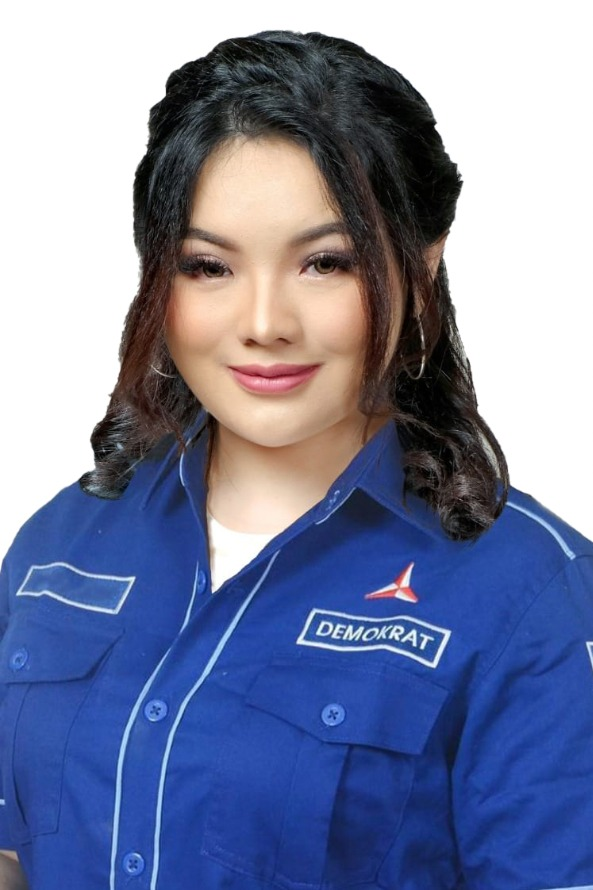
- Hillary Brigitta Lasut in 2023

Member of the House of Representatives
- Incumbent
- Assumed office 1 October 2024
- Constituency: North Sulawesi
- In office 1 October 2019 – 21 November 2023
- Succeeded by: Kamran Muchtar Podomi
- Constituency: North Sulawesi

Personal details
- Born: 22 May 1996 (age 30)
- Party: NasDem Party (since 2023)
- Parents: Elly Engelbert Lasut (father); Telly Tjanggulung (mother)

Hillary Brigitta Lasut (born 22 May 1996) is an Indonesian politician. She has been a member of the House of Representatives since 2024, having previously served from 2019 to 2023. She is the daughter of Elly Engelbert Lasut and Telly Tjanggulung.
