= Sjamsuridjal =

Indonesian politician (1903–1964)

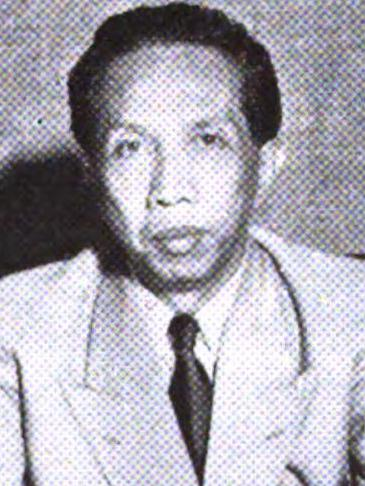

2nd Mayor of Jakarta
- In office 27 June 1951 – 8 December 1953
- Preceded by: Suwiryo
- Succeeded by: Sudiro

3rd Mayor of Surakarta
- In office 14 November 1946 – 13 January 1949
- Preceded by: Iskak Tjokroadisurjo
- Succeeded by: Soedjatmo Soemowerdojo

2nd Mayor of Bandung
- In office 1945–1946
- Preceded by: RA Atmadinata
- Succeeded by: Ukar Bratakusumah

Personal details
- Born: 11 October 1903; Karanganyar, Kebumen, Dutch East Indies
- Died: 29 December 1964 (aged 61); Surabaya, East Java, Indonesia
- Political party: Masyumi Party

Raden Sjamsuridjal (11 October 1903 – 29 December 1964), sometimes written Syamsurizal, was an Indonesian politician who served as the Mayor of Jakarta between 1951 and 1953. Before becoming Jakarta's mayor, he had been mayor of Bandung and Solo.

== Early career ==
During his time as a student, Sjamsuridjal was active in the student organization Jong Java, and was its general chairman during its 1924 annual congress. In said congress, Sjamsuridjal put forth a proposal for Islamic teachings for willing organization members, which was shot down following a heated debate and a vote. Due to this, Sjamsuridjal went to Agus Salim and established the Jong Islamieten Bond.

== Mayoralty ==
=== Bandung and Surakarta ===
Before becoming Mayor of Jakarta, Sjamsuridjal served as the mayor of Bandung in 1945. Similarly to the career of president Joko Widodo, he also served as the mayor of Solo (Surakarta) from 1946 to 1949.

=== Mayor of Jakarta ===
On 27 June 1951, he was appointed to replace Suwiryo as Mayor of Jakarta. During his mayorship, he oversaw the construction of a new power plant in Ancol and improved healthcare through introducing inoculations and building hospitals. He also endorsed educational programs and established street lighting across the city. Although he also extensively created housing projects and attempted to eradicate slums in the city, the slum areas expanded throughout his tenure.

Sjamsuridjal was replaced by Sudiro on 9 November 1953. This replacement resulted in demonstrations by Masyumi Party supporters - as the new mayor originated from the Indonesian National Party.
