= Sam Ratulangi =

Indonesian politician (1890–1949)

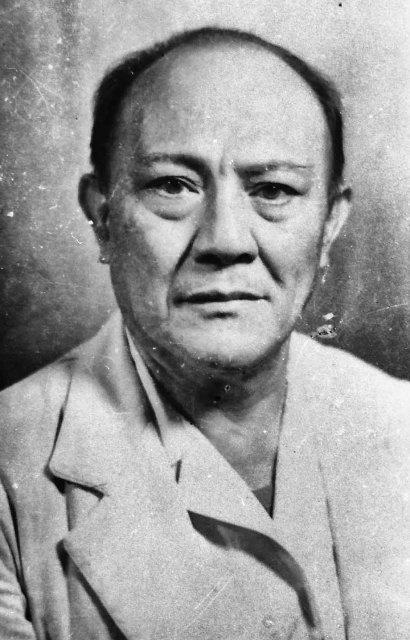

1st Governor of Sulawesi
- In office 1945–1949
- President: Sukarno
- Preceded by: None
- Succeeded by: Bernard Wilhelm Lapian

Personal details
- Born: Gerungan Saul Samuel Jacob Ratulangi; 5 November 1890 Tondano, North Sulawesi, Dutch East Indies
- Died: 30 June 1949 (aged 58) Jakarta, Indonesia
- Spouse(s): Emilie Suzanne Houtman (m. until 1926); Maria Catharina Josephine Tambajong (m. 1928)
- Children: 5 (Zus)
- Education: University of Zurich

Gerungan Saul Samuel Jacob Ratulangi (also written as Ratu Langie; 5 November 1890 – 30 June 1949), known as Sam Ratulangi, was a Minahasan teacher, journalist, politician, and national hero from North Sulawesi, Indonesia. He was part of the committee that ratified the Constitution of Indonesia and served as the first Governor of Sulawesi.

== Early life ==
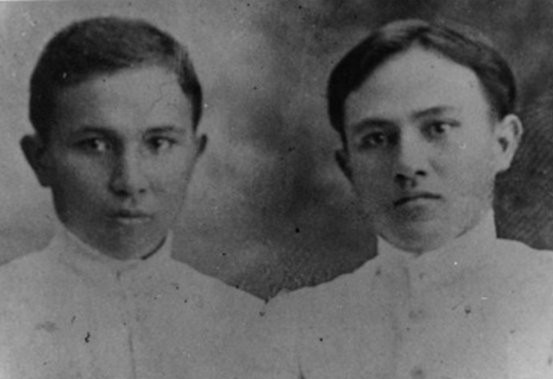
Ratulangi (right) with his cousin in 1910

The son of Jozias Ratulangi and Augustina Gerungan, both from wealthy, well-respected Minahasa families, Sam Ratulangi was born on 5 November 1890 in Tondano in North Sulawesi, which at the time was a part of the Dutch East Indies. Jozias was a teacher at the Hoofden School (middle school for children of local village heads) in Tondano. He received teacher training in Haarlem, Netherlands around 1880. Augustina was the daughter of Jacob Gerungan, the Majoor (district chief) of Tondano-Touliang.

Ratulangi was a gifted student, who studied at the local Dutch language elementary school (ELS or Europeesche Lagere School) and then at the Hoofden School. In 1904, he left his home to attend STOVIA (a medical school in Java) after receiving a scholarship from the school. Once in Batavia (now Jakarta), he had a change of heart and decided to attend the technical high school Koningin Wilhelmina. Ratulangi graduated in 1908 and started work on railroad construction in the south Priangan area of West Java. There he experienced unequal treatment in wages and employee lodging compared to those who were of Indo (Eurasian) descent.

== Time in Europe ==
=== Studies in the Netherlands and Switzerland ===
In 1911, Ratulangi returned home, because his mother was seriously ill. His mother died on 19 November 1911. His father had died when he was in Java. After their mother's death, Ratulangi and his two sisters divided their parents' inheritance. Ratulangi planned to use the money he received to fund his education in Europe. He arrived in Amsterdam in 1912 and continued his studies that he started in Java, which had been cut short due to his mother's illness. In 1913, he received a certificate to teach middle school level mathematics (Middelbare Acte Wiskunde en Paedagogiek).

Ratulangi continued his studies at a university (Note: Some sources identify the university as the University of Amsterdam (Universiteit van Amsterdam), while other sources identify it as VU University Amsterdam (Vrije Universiteit Amsterdam).) in Amsterdam for two more years. However, he was not able to complete his studies, because he was prohibited from taking the examination. The university required a high school level certificate, which Ratulangi did not have, because he never completed studies at either a Hogere Burgerschool (HBS) or Algemene Middelbare School (AMS). At the advice of Mr. Abendanon, a Dutchman who was sympathetic (Note: Mr. Abendanon was given the nickname "Friend of Indië" (Sahabat Hindia).) to those from Indonesia or what was called Indië at the time, Ratulangi applied and was accepted to the University of Zurich in Switzerland. In 1919, he obtained a doctorate in mathematics and science from the university.

=== Nationalist activism ===
During his time in Amsterdam, Ratulangi frequently met with Sosrokartono (R.A. Kartini's brother) and the three founders of the Indische Party, Ernest Douwes Dekker, Tjipto Mangoenkoesoemo, and Soewardi Soerjaningrat. Ratulangi was also active in the association for Indonesian students (Indische Vereeniging or Perhimpunan Indonesia). He was elected as chairman of the association in 1914. He invited speakers who were sympathetic to the Indonesian cause, such as Conrad Theodor van Deventer and Jacques Henrij Abendanon. In Switzerland, he was active in the Association of Asian Students (Associations d'étudiants asiatiques) where he met Jawaharlal Nehru from India.

Ratulangi was also active in writing articles. In one article entitled "Sarekat Islam" that was published in Onze Kolonien (1913), Ratulangi wrote about the growth of Sarekat Islam (a cooperative of local merchants in Indonesia) and also praised the Boedi Oetomo movement in Indonesia. Toward the end of the article, Ratulangi wrote the following:

History has no record of any nation that is colonialized forever. It is hopeful that the inevitable separation (of Indie and the Netherlands) will proceed in a peaceful way, which should make it possible that also thereafter the good interaction of cultural elements between Indie and the Netherlands, that have been entwined throughout the many centuries of history, can continue.

== Independence struggle ==
=== Return to Indonesia ===
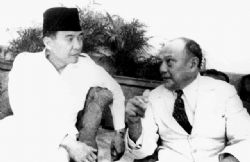
Ratulangi with Sukarno in 1948

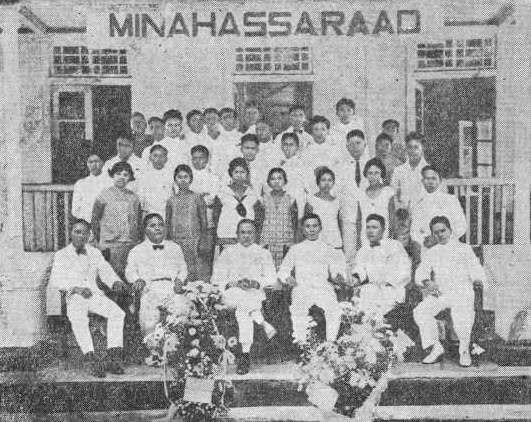
Ratulangi with others in front of the Minahasa Raad building

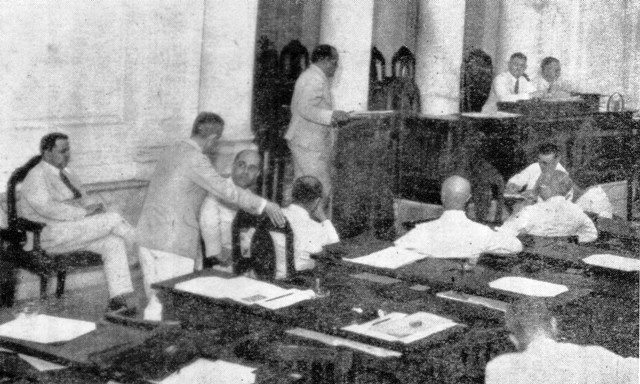
Ratulangi about to give a speech at the Volksraad in 1927

On his return to Indonesia in 1919, Ratulangi moved to Yogyakarta to teach math and science at the technical high school Prinses Juliana School. After three years of teaching, he moved to Bandung and started the insurance company Assurantie Maatschappij Indonesia with Roland Tumbelaka, a medical doctor by profession and fellow Minahasan. The company name contained the first known instance of the word "Indonesia" being used in official documents. It has been noted that Sukarno first met Ratulangi when he was visiting Bandung for a conference. He noticed the name of Ratulangi's company that included "Indonesia". He was curious about the owner of the business and met Ratulangi in his office.

=== Return to Minahasa ===
In 1923, Ratulangi was nominated by the Minahasa Union party (Perserikatan Minahasa) to become secretary of the regional representative body of Minahasa in Manado (Minahasa Raad). He held this position from 1924 to 1927. During his time as secretary, Ratulangi lobbied for more rights for Minahasans. He was widely credited with getting the colonial government to abolish forced labor (Herendiensten) in Minahasa. He was also instrumental in the opening the areas of Modoinding and Kanarom in south Minahasa for transmigration and the establishment of a foundation to support the education of students with financial needs.

On 16 August 1927, Ratulangi and R. Tumbelaka started the Minahasa Unity party (Persatuan Minahasa). Its predecessor, the Minahasa Union party (Perserikatan Minahasa), included both civilian and military members. Some of the members from the military had revolted against the Dutch and hence they were prohibited from participating in political organizations. Ratulangi and Tumbelaka decided to form a new party, the Minahasa Unity party, which would only have civilian members. The existence of this party representing a specific region of Sulawesi gave its members local identity, but it also served the purpose of promoting national unity. The party "called for the 'solidarity of all population groups of Indonesia'". In 1939, Persatuan Minahasa was one of the political parties that formed the Indonesian Political Federation (GAPI or Gabungan Politik Indonesia). The others were Gerindo (Gerakan Rakyat Indonesia), Parindra (Partai Indonesia Raya), Pasundan, PPKI (Persatuan Partai Katolik Indonesia), and PSII (Persatuan Sarekat Islam Indonesia).

=== Member of the Volksraad ===
Appointed to the People's Council Volksraad in 1927 to represent the constituents in Minahasa, Ratulangi continued to agitate for equal rights and advocating Indonesian nationalism by aligning himself with the Nationalist Caucus (Fraksi Kebangsaan) that was started by Mohammad Husni Thamrin. He was a co-sponsor of the Soetardjo Petition, which expressed the desire for political autonomy through gradual reforms within a ten year period. The petition passed the Volksraad, but was not accepted by the colonial government. This response to the petition led to the formation of GAPI (described earlier). Ratulangi was not hesitant to criticize the authorities and would eventually be considered a risk to them. He continued to serve in the Volksraad until 1937, when he was arrested due to his increasing political views. He was jailed for several months in Sukamiskin in Bandung.

In 1932, Ratulangi was one of the founding members of the United Scholars of Indonesia (Vereniging van Indonesische Academici). He was also part of a group of church leaders and nationalists (including B.W. Lapian and A.A. Maramis) who wanted a church denomination that was free and separate from the official church institution of the Dutch East-Indies (called Protestantsche Kerk in Nederlandsch-Indie or Indische Kerk). In March 1933, the independent Convention of Protestant Churches in Minahasa (KGPM or Kerapatan Gereja Protestan Minahasa) was established.

In June 1937, Ratulangi's book "Indonesia in de Pacific" was published. The book was considered to be visionary in its content, in which Ratulangi warned against the militarisation of Japan and foresaw the possibility that Japan might invade the Indonesian archipelago because of its natural resources which Japan lacks. He described the leading role that Indonesia and other countries in Southeast Asia around the Pacific Rim could play — the Pacific Ocean could equal the Atlantic in importance.

After being released from prison in 1938, Ratulangi became the editor of Nationale Commentaren, a Dutch-language news and issues magazine. He used the magazine to write opinions against the colonial government's unfair actions and also to make his fellows Indonesians aware of the current state. Subscribers of the magazine included the offices of the Prime Minister of the Netherlands, the Dutch Ministry of Colonies, and the Governor-General of the Dutch East Indies.

=== Japanese occupation ===
After the Dutch surrendered the Dutch East Indies to the Japanese, on 20 March 1942 the Japanese authorities prohibited any kind of political activity. Because all political organizations were disbanded, Ratulangi participated in the relief effort of the families of Dutch Colonial army (KNIL or Koninklijk Nederlands Indisch Leger) soldiers. In 1943, Ratulangi was assigned as adviser to the occupying military government. In 1944, he was transferred to advise the military government in Makassar in South Sulawesi, which was part of the eastern territory that was controlled by the Japanese Navy. In June 1945, Ratulangi established an organization called Source of People's Blood (SUDARA or Sumber Darah Rakyat). The naming is very close to the Indonesian word "saudara", which in means brother/sister. Ratulangi used the organization to energize nationalist sentiments in Sulawesi in anticipation of possible independence in the near future.

== After Independence ==
=== Preparatory Committee for Indonesian Independence ===
In early August 1945, Ratulangi was appointed as one of the members of the Preparatory Committee for Indonesian Independence (PPKI or Panitia Persiapan Kemerdekaan Indonesia) from Sulawesi. On 17 August 1945, Sukarno announced the Proclamation of Indonesian Independence. Ratulangi had already arrived in Batavia with the other PPKI appointees from the eastern territory for meetings and hence he was present during the proclamation ceremony. The subsequent PPKI meetings starting on the day after the proclamation produced the Constitution of Indonesia and the appointment of Sukarno and Mohammad Hatta as President and Vice President, respectively, by acclamation. The meetings also organized the country into administrative regions where Ratulangi was appointed Governor of Sulawesi.

=== Governor of Sulawesi ===
Upon returning to Makassar and formally announcing the proclamation of independence, Ratulangi was faced with a very delicate situation. The Japanese were initially not ready to surrender their weapons. The Allied Forces under the command of Australian Brigadier General Ivan Dougherty arrived in September 1945 with the appointment as Military Governor. With him came elements of the Netherlands Indies Civil Administration (NICA or Nederlandsch-Indische Civiele Administratie) who were ready to assume the Dutch East Indies state as before the war. Along with NICA came KNIL soldiers to assist the Dutch civil government. With all the foreign influx, the local youth in Sulawesi were prepared to fight at all costs to maintain Indonesian independence. In addition, Ratulangi received support from the local traditional chiefs (raja-raja) including from the Sultanate of Bone and the Kingdom of Luwu who pledged their allegiance to the newly established Republic.

Ratulangi was able to hold negotiations in an effort to maintain the peace, but it only held for two months. Nevertheless, he was able to organize some semblance of a region government that operated for nine months. On 5 April 1946, Ratulangi and several of his staff were taken from their homes and held by the Dutch military police. They were imprisoned for three months until their exile to Serui Island in the Yapen Islands archipelago in Western New Guinea.

=== Exile in Serui ===
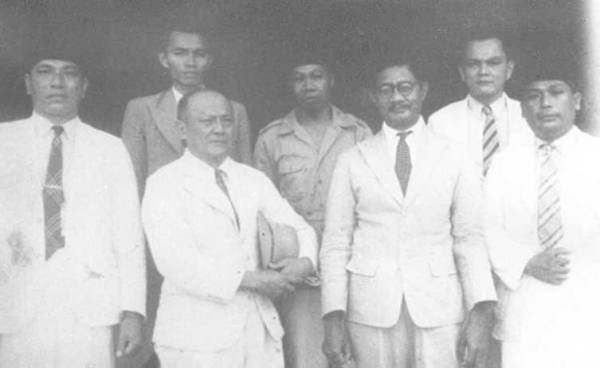
Ratulangi with others who were exiled to Serui

Ratulangi was exiled to Serui with six of his staff and their families: Josef Latumahina, Lanto Daeng Pasewang, Willem Sumampouw Tanod 'Wim' Pondaag, Suwarno, I. P. Lumban Tobing, and Intje Saleh Daeng Tompo. In Serui, the group looked for activities and interactions with the local community. They established a local school and a social organization to assist the women in the community. Politically, Ratulangi was involved in the establishment of the Indonesian Irian Independence Party (PKII) in Irian that was led by Silas Papare with Ratulangi as an adviser.

== Return from exile and death ==
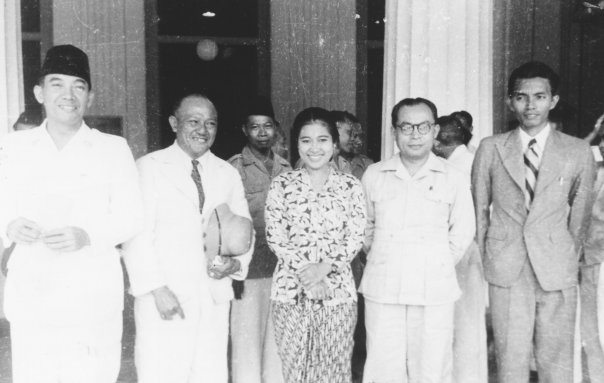
Ratulangi with Sukarno, Fatmawati, and Hatta in 1948

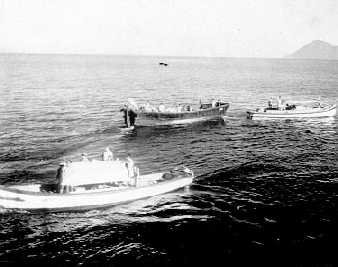
Ratulangi's coffin arriving in Manado in 1949

On 23 March 1948, after the signing of the Renville Agreement, the Dutch released Ratulangi and his colleagues. They were transferred to Surabaya and then escorted to the demarcation line near Mojokerto and Jombang where they made their way to the capital of the republic in Yogyakarta. They were greeted warmly on their arrival in Yogyakarta and a reception was held by Sukarno with many Indonesian leaders in attendance. Ratulangi was appointed special adviser to the Indonesian government and a member of the Indonesian delegation in negotiations with the Dutch. He also visited troops in East Java and attended a financial conference in Kaliurang. Around this time, his was having issues with his health.

On 10 November 1948, a manifesto was announced by the Radio Republik Indonesia that urged the people of eastern Indonesia who were under the control of the Dutch to keep their unity with the Republic of Indonesia in order to one day become fully independent throughout Indonesia. The manifesto was called Manifes Ratulangie or Manifes Djokja and in addition to Ratulangi, it was also signed by I Gusti Ketut Pudja, Sukarjo Wiryopranoto, and others. The first point of the manifesto reads:

That the struggle, which is now being fought out by the Republic of Indonesia does not only involve the material, mental, moral, and political essentials of that part of the Indonesian people limited to the Republic of Indonesia, but also the national freedom and national dignity of the whole Indonesian people and the recognition of the fundamental rights of that people to live as a free and independent nation, on the soil and on that part of the world, which the Almighty God bestowed on them.

During Operation Kraai (the second Dutch military aggression against Indonesia), Yogyakarta was captured and the Indonesian leaders including Sukarno and Hatta were captured and exiled to Bangka. Ratulangi was captured by the Dutch on 25 December 1948. He was transferred to Jakarta on 12 January 1949 to be subsequently transferred to Bangka. However, due to his failing health, he was allowed to stay in Jakarta on house arrest. Ratulangi died on 30 June 1949. Ratulangi was temporarily buried in Tanah Abang, Jakarta. On 23 July 1949, his remains were transported to Manado on the KPM ship Swartenhondt. On 1 August 1949, the ship reached Manado. The next day Ratulangi's remains were transported and buried in his hometown of Tondano.

== Family ==
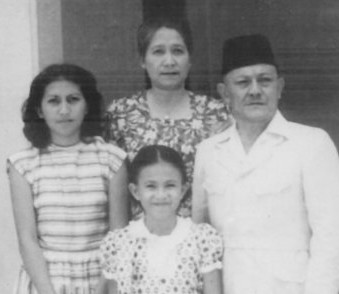
Ratulangi, Tambajong, and two of their daughters

Ratulangi was married twice. He married Emilie Suzanne Houtman and had two children, Corneille Jose Albert 'Odie' Ratulangi and Emilia Augustina 'Zus' Ratulangi. Ratulangi and Houtman divorced in 1926. Ratulangi married Maria Catharina Josephine 'Tjen' Tambajong in 1928. They had three children, Milia Maria Matulanda 'Milly' Ratulangi, Everdina Augustina 'Lani' Ratulangi, and Wulan Rugian Manampira 'Uki' Ratulangi.

Ratulangi had two older sisters, Wulan Kayes Rachel Wilhelmina Ratulangi and Wulan Rachel Wilhelmina Maria Ratulangi. Both had notable achievements. Wulan Kayes was the first Indonesian woman to pass the klein-ambtenaars examination for low-level government jobs in 1898. Her marks were higher than the men who took the exam. Wulan Rachel was the first Indonesian woman to receive the hulpacte basic certificate for elementary education in Dutch in 1912.

== Honours and legacy ==
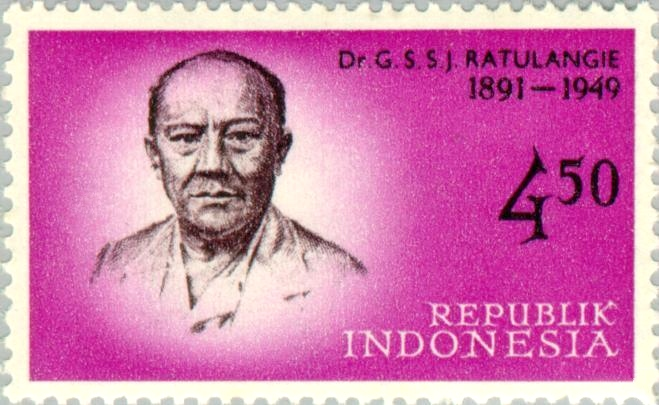
1962 stamp of Ratulangi

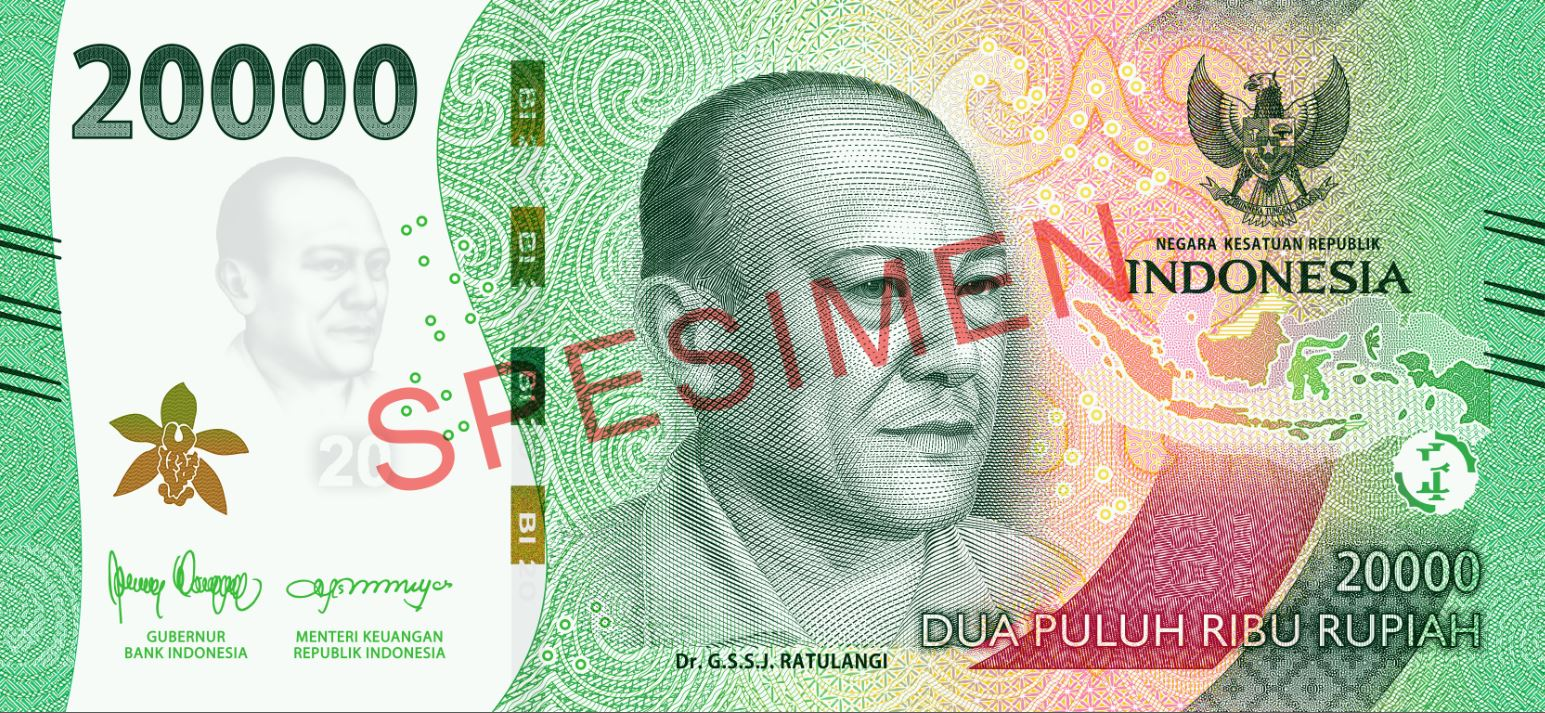
20,000 rupiah banknote featuring Sam Ratulangi, issued in 2022

In August 1961, Ratulangi was posthumously awarded the title of National Hero of Indonesia by Sukarno. He also received posthumously the Bintang Gerilya in 1958, the Bintang Mahaputera Adipradana in 1960, and the Bintang Satyalancana in 1961.

Ratulangi is well-regarded in the Minahasa region of North Sulawesi. Main artery roads in all cities in Minahasa (Bitung, Manado, Tomohon, and Tondano) are named after Ratulangi. Manado's international airport is also named after him as is the state university in Manado. Statues and busts of Ratulangi can be found on the intersection between Jalan Sam Ratulangi and Jalan Bethesda in Manado, on the campus of Sam Ratulangi University, beside Ratulangi's tomb in Tondano, in Jakarta and Serui, and even in a park in Davao City (Philippines), which is located just north of the island of Sulawesi. In 2016, the Ministry of Finance issued new 2016 series notes in which the Rp. 20,000 valued note depicts Ratulangi on the front of the note. Sam Ratulangi is also featured on the newer 2022 series.

== Bibliography ==
- Abdullah, Taufik (2009). Indonesia: Towards Democracy. Singapore: Institute of Southeast Asian Studies. ISBN 978-981-230-366-0.
- Abeyasekere, Susan (April 1973). "The Soetardjo Petition". Indonesia. 15: 81–107. doi:10.2307/3350793. hdl:1813/53559. JSTOR 3350793.
- Andoko, Ediyami; Asmuni, Suharningsih; Muchri (1975). Asal-usul Nama-nama Kapal Perang TNI-AL: Unsur Strategis [The Origins of the Names of Indonesian Navy Ships: A Strategic Aspect] (in Indonesian). Jakarta: Indonesian Navy Historical Office (Dinas Sejarah TNI-AL).
- Basa, Mick (17 August 2017). "In Davao, a Park 'Quietly' Honors Indonesian Hero". Davao Today.
- "BI to Issue New Print Banknotes, Mint Coins with Heroes Images". Cabinet Secretariat of the Republic of Indonesia (Sekretariat Negara Republik Indonesia). 15 September 2016.
- Elson, Robert (2008). The Idea of Indonesia: A History. Cambridge: Cambridge Press. ISBN 978-0-521-87648-3.
- "Plechtige uitvaart dr. Ratulangi" [The Solemn Funeral of Dr. Ratulangi] (in Dutch). Het Dagblad: uitgave van de Nederlandsche Dagbladpers te Batavia. 23 July 1949.
- Ide Anak Agung Gde Agung (1996). From The Formation of the State of East Indonesia Towards the Establishment of the United State of Indonesia. Jakarta: Yayasan Pustaka Obor Indonesia.
- Kanahele, George (1967). The Japanese Occupation of Indonesia: Prelude to Independence (PhD). Cornell University.
- Künkler, Miryam (2017). "Constitutionalism, Islamic Law, and Religious Freedom in Postindependence Indonesia". In Bâli, Aslı; Lerner, Hanna (eds.). Constitution Writing, Religion and Democracy. Cambridge: Cambridge University Press. ISBN 978-110-707-051-6.
- Legge, John (1988). Intellectuals and Nationalism in Indonesia: A Study of the Following Recruited by Sutan Sjahrir in Occupation Jakarta. Ithaca, N.Y.: Cornell Modern Indonesia Project. ISBN 0-8776-3034-8.
- Leirissa, R.Z. (1997). Minahasa di Awal Perang Kemerdekaan Indonesia: Peristiwa Merah-Putih dan Sebab-musababnya [Minahasa at the Start of the War of Indonesian Independence: The Red-White Incident and Its Causes] (in Indonesian). Jakarta: Pustaka Sinar Harapan and Yayasan Malesung Rondor. ISBN 9-7941-6465-8.
- Lumintang, Onnie (1997). Biografi Pahlawan Nasional: Marthin Indey dan Silas Papare [Biographies of National Heroes: Marthin Indey and Silas Papare] (in Indonesian). Jakarta: Ministry of Education and Culture of the Republic of Indonesia (Departemen Pendidikan dan Kebudayaan Republik Indonesia).
- Wajah dan Sejarah Perjuangan Pahlawan Nasional [Faces and History of the Struggle of the National Heroes] (in Indonesian). Jakarta: Ministry of Social Affairs of the Republic of Indonesia (Departemen Sosial Republik Indonesia). 1994.
- Masykuri (1985). Dr. GSSJ. Ratulangi (in Indonesian). Jakarta: Ministry of Education and Culture of the Republic of Indonesia (Departemen Pendidikan dan Kebudayaan Republik Indonesia).
- Mirnawati (2012). Kumpulan Pahlawan Indonesia Terlengkap [The Most Complete Collection of Indonesian Heroes] (in Indonesian). Jakarta: Cerdas Interaktif. ISBN 978-979-788-343-0.
- Parengkuan, Fendy (1982). A.A. Maramis, SH (in Indonesian). Jakarta: Ministry of Education and Culture of the Republic of Indonesia (Departemen Pendidikan dan Kebudayaan Republik Indonesia).
- Pawiloy, Sarita (1987). Sejarah Perjuangan Angkatan 45 di Sulawesi Selatan [The History of the 1945 Generation Struggles in South Sulawesi] (in Indonesian). Jakarta: Angkatan 45.
- Poeze, Harry (2008). Di Negeri Penjajah: Orang Indonesia di Negeri Belanda, 1600-1950 [In the Land of the Colonialists: Indonesians in the Netherlands, 1600-1950] (in Indonesian). Jakarta: KPG in association with KITLV-Jakarta.
- Pondaag, W. S. T. (1966). Pahlawan Kemerdekaan Nasional Mahaputera Dr. G. S. S. J. Ratu Langie: Riwajat Hidup dan Perdjoangannja [Mahaputera National Independence Hero Dr. G. S. S. J. Ratu Langie: His Biography and Struggles] (in Indonesian). Surabaja: Jajasan Penerbitan Dr. G. S. S. J. Ratu Langie.
- Schouten, Mieke (1998). Leadership and Social Mobility in a Southeast Asian Society: Minahasa, 1677–1983. Leiden: KITLV Press. ISBN 9-0671-8109-9.
- Soedarmanta, J.B. (2007). Jejak-jejak Pahlawan: Perekat Kesatuan Bangsa Indonesia [The Trails of Heroes: What Holds the Unity of Indonesia] (in Indonesian). Jakarta: Gramedia Widiasarana Indonesia. ISBN 978-979-759-716-0.
- Sondakh, Adolf (2002). Siwu, Richard; Ointoe, Reiner (eds.). Manusia Hidup untuk Memanusiakan Manusia [Man Lives to Humanize Man] (in Indonesian). Jakarta: Pustaka Sinar Harapan. ISBN 9-7941-6757-6.
- Straver, Hans (2018). Vaders en Dochters: Molukse Historie in de Nederlandse Literatuur van de Negentiende Eeuw en haar Weerklank in Indonesië [Fathers and Daughters: Moluccan History in Dutch Literature of the Nineteenth Century and its Resonance in Indonesia] (in Dutch). Leiden: Verloren. ISBN 978-908-704-702-3.
- Suwondo, Bambang (1978). Sejarah Kebangkitan Nasional Daerah Sulawesi Utara [A History of the National Awakening of North Sulawesi] (in Indonesian). Ministry of Education and Culture of the Republic of Indonesia (Departemen Pendidikan dan Kebudayaan Republik Indonesia).
- Taroreh, Osvald (January 26, 2012). "Pionir Gereja dan Pahlawan Kemerdekaan dari Minahasa: Bernard Wilhelm Lapian" [Bernard Wilhelm Lapian: Church Pioneer and Indonesian Independence Hero from Minahasa]. Bejana Advent Indonesia Timur (in Indonesian).
- Toer, Pramoedya Ananta; Toer, Koesalah Soebagyo; Kamil, Ediati, eds. (2003). Kronologi Revolusi Indonesia. Vol. 4. Jakarta: Kepustakaan Populer Gramedia. ISBN 9-7990-2388-2.
- Touwen-Bouwsma, Elly (2013). "Indonesian Nationalists and the Japanese". In SarDesai, D.R. (ed.). Southeast Asian History: Essential Readings. Boulder, Colorado: Westview Press.
- Turner, Barry (2017). A.H. Nasution and Indonesia's Elites: "People's Resistance" in the War of Independence and Postwar Politics. Lanham, Maryland: Lexington Books. ISBN 978-149-856-011-5.
