= Sam Ratulangi University =

State university in Manado, North Sulawesi, Indonesia

- Universitas Sam Ratulangi
- Motto: Sitou Timou Tumou Tou
- Motto in English: Humans live to humanize others
- Type: Public university
- Established: 4 July 1961; 65 years ago as the University of North and Central Sulawesi; renamed on 14 September 1965; 61 years ago
- Parent institution: Ministry of Higher Education, Science, and Technology (Indonesia)
- Accreditation: Excellent Accreditation [BAN-PT]
- Affiliations: Association of Southeast Asian Institutions of Higher Learning
- Rector: Prof. Dr. Ir. Jamaluddin Jompa, M.Sc.
- Location: Jl. Kampus UNSRAT Bahu, Malalayang District 95115, Manado, North Sulawesi, Indonesia; 1°27′22.3″N 124°49′38.1″E
- Campus: Urban
- Colours: Light blue
- Website: www.unsrat.ac.id

Sam Ratulangi University (UNSRAT) is a public university located in Manado, North Sulawesi, Indonesia. The university is named after Dr. G.S.S.J. Sam Ratulangi, a national hero from North Sulawesi. Its motto, Sitou Timou Tumou Tou, is commonly translated as "humans live to humanize others".

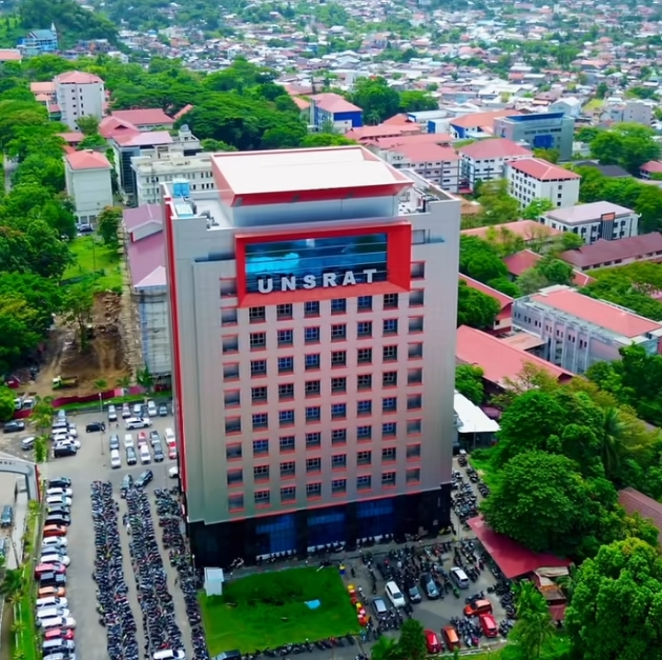
Aerial view of Sam Ratulangi University

== History ==
Sam Ratulangi University has evolved from local universities starting as far back as 1954. Pinaesaan University was begun on 1 October 1954 with only the law faculty. Then in 1957, Permesta University was started. These two smaller universities were merged to become the University of Manado in 1958, with four faculties: Law, Economics, Letters, and Political Science.

In 1961 the Ministry of Education based on Ministerial Decree No.002/Sek/PU, recognized the newly named University of North and Central Sulawesi as a state university with seven faculties: Law, Medicine, Agriculture, Economics, Political Science, Letters and Education. After several changes and re-organizations, the university was renamed Sam Ratulangi University in 1965 based on Presidential Decree No. 277/1965. The new name was in honor of Dr. Gerungan Saul Samuel Jacob Ratulangi, renowned throughout Indonesia, but hailing from Manado, as a leader in education.

Initially, Unsrat had only seven faculties: Medicine, Agriculture, Animal Sciences, Law and Public Education, Economics, Political Science, and Engineering. In 1965, the Faculty of Letters which previously had private status was inaugurated into Unsrat. One year later, the Faculty of Fisheries was established in Tahuna. In 1982, the Faculty of Teaching and Education, Manado in Gorontalo switch to Faculty of Teaching and Education Unsrat in Gorontalo (then known as State University of Gorontalo). The postgraduate program established in 1985, followed by the Faculty of Mathematics and Science in 1998, and faculty of Public Health in 2009.

== Faculties ==
The university consists of eleven faculties with one postgraduate program:

- Faculty of Medicine
- Faculty of Engineering
- Faculty of Agriculture
- Faculty of Animal Husbandry
- Faculty of Fishery and Marines
- Faculty of Economics and Business
- Faculty of Law
- Faculty of Social and Political Sciences
- Faculty of Humanities
- Faculty of Mathematics and Sciences
- Faculty of Public Health

== Notable alumni ==
- Monica Fransisca Antoinette Khonado – goodwill ambassador for the Ministry of Environment and Forestry of Indonesia, TV Presenter, TV commercial model, Miss Earth Indonesia 2021, Top 20 at the Miss Earth 2021 pageant.

== See also ==
- Blue Choir of Sam Ratulangi University
