= Bernard Wilhelm Lapian =

Indonesian journalist and politician

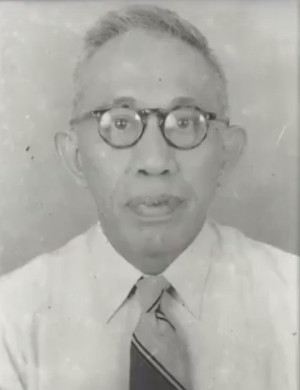

Governor of Sulawesi (Acting)
- In office 17 August 1950 – 1 July 1951
- President: Sukarno
- Preceded by: Sam Ratulangi
- Succeeded by: Sudiro

Mayor of Manado
- In office 1945 – November 1947
- Preceded by: Albertus Bernadus Waworuntu
- Succeeded by: Evert Ryndhard Semuel Warouw

Personal details
- Born: Bernard Wilhelm Lapian; 30 June 1892 Kawangkoan, Minahasa, North Sulawesi, Dutch East-Indies
- Died: 5 April 1977 (aged 84) Jakarta, Indonesia
- Spouse: Maria Adriana Pangkey

Bernard Wilhelm "B. W." Lapian (30 June 1892 – 5 April 1977) was a nationalist involved in the struggle for Indonesian independence. He published several newspapers that gave voice to the welfare of the Indonesian people and promoted Indonesian nationalism. He was also part a group who established a separate Christian denomination from the official Dutch East-Indies church institution. After Indonesia gained its independence, Lapian served as head of the district (or mayor) of Manado and acting governor of Sulawesi. In 2015, he was given the title of National Hero of Indonesia by President Joko Widodo.

== Early life ==
Bernard Wilhelm Lapian was born in Kawangkoan, North Sulawesi on 30 June 1892 to Enos Lapian and Petronella Geertruida Mapaliey. Lapian went to the Dutch language elementary school (Amurangse School) in Amurang, about 40 kilometers from Kawangkoan. He would continue to take courses up to the level of junior secondary school (MULO or Meer Uitgebreid Lager Onderwijs).

== Journalist, politician, and church leader ==
=== Publications ===
Lapian was 17 in 1909 when he started working at the Dutch shipping company KPM (Koninklijke Paketvaart-Maatschappij). He would work for KPM for 20 years. Initially working in various positions on ships, by 1919 Lapian became responsible for ship logistics and worked in Batavia (now Jakarta). During his time in Batavia, he published articles in a newspaper called Pangkal Kemadjoean that focused on fighting Dutch colonialism. He also published the newspaper Fadjar Kemadjoean (1924–1928) that promoted the welfare of the Indonesian people. Later in 1940, he would publish a local paper in Kawangkoan called Semangat Hidoep.

=== The People's Representative ===
Lapian served as a representative of the people in two capacities, one regional and another for the entire Dutch East Indies. From 1930 to 1942, he was a member of the local council called Dewan Minahasa (Minahasaraad) in Manado. Members of this council represented the people throughout the region of Minahasa. In 1938, Lapian also became a member of People's Council for the Dutch East Indies (Volksraad) in Batavia and aligned himself with the nationalist caucus that was led by Mohammad Husni Thamrin.

=== Convention of Protestant Churches in Minahasa ===
Lapian was part of a group of church leaders and nationalists (including Sam Ratulangi and A.A. Maramis) who wanted a church denomination that was free and separate from the official church institution of the Dutch East-Indies (called Protestantsche Kerk in Nederlandsch-Indie or Indische Kerk). In March 1933, the independent Convention of Protestant Churches in Minahasa or Kerapatan Gereja Protestan Minahasa (KGPM) was established and Lapian was named secretary. He was named chair of the denomination in 1938 and helped establish 16 elementary schools and 17 middle schools.

== The 14 February 1946 incident in Manado ==
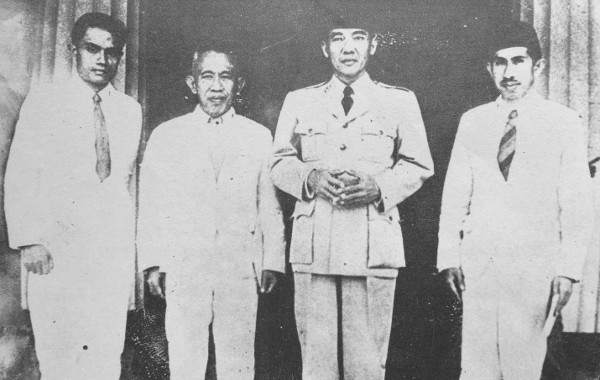
B.W. Lapian (second from left) meeting with President Sukarno

At the end of World War II, Indonesia proclaimed its independence on 17 August 1945. However, the Netherlands were determined to return to Indonesia and this effort was supported by the Allied Forces who entered Indonesia after Japan surrendered. This started the Indonesian National Revolution. On 14 February 1946, indigenous members of the Royal Netherlands East Indies Army (KNIL) in Manado with the assistance of local youth and freedom fighters captured the Dutch officers of the KNIL. On 16 February 1946, Lapian who was the head of the district of Manado at the time was named the head of the government of the Republic of Indonesia in North Sulawesi. The revolt lasted until 10 March 1946, when the Dutch were able to re-occupy the region. Lapian was captured and jailed in Manado. He was moved to Cipinang in Jakarta in 1947 and then to Sukamiskin in Bandung in 1948. He was released on 20 December 1949 after the Dutch–Indonesian Round Table Conference agreement.

== Acting Governor of Sulawesi ==
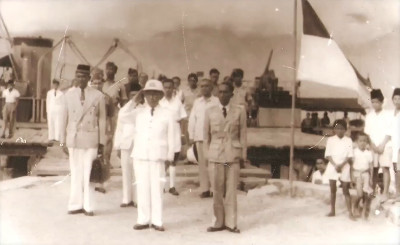
Lapian visiting as Acting Governor of Sulawesi

Lapian became acting governor of Sulawesi on 17 August 1950. He would stay in this position until 1 July 1951. During his tenure as acting governor, Lapian opened and developed the area around Dumoga, Bolaang Mongondow for settlement and farming. He built a road that connected Kotamobagu and the Molibago region. He established regional representative councils throughout Sulawesi and conducted the first post-independence elections in the Minahasa region on 14 June 1951. He also started the effort to reach peace with the rebellion led by Kahar Muzakar.

== Death and honors ==
Lapian died on 5 April 1977 in Jakarta. He was buried in the Kalibata Heroes' Cemetery.

In 1958, Lapian was awarded the Bintang Gerilya and in 1976, he received the Bintang Mahaputra Pratama. He was declared a National Hero by President Joko Widodo in a ceremony at the State Palace on 5 November 2015. A monument was erected in Kawangkoan for Lapian and Ch. Taulu to commemorate their involvement in the incident on 14 February 1946 in Manado.

== Family ==
Lapian married Maria Adriana Pangkey on 30 May 1928 in Tomohon. They had six children including Adrian Bernard Lapian, an expert in Indonesian maritime history, and Louisa Magdalena Lapian, an expert in family and gender law. Lapian's brother, Benjamin Julian "Bert" Lapian, also served as Mayor of Manado from 1 Maret 1952 to 1 September 1953. One of his grandchildren is Jack Boyd Lapian.
