= Andrei Angouw =

Indonesian politician

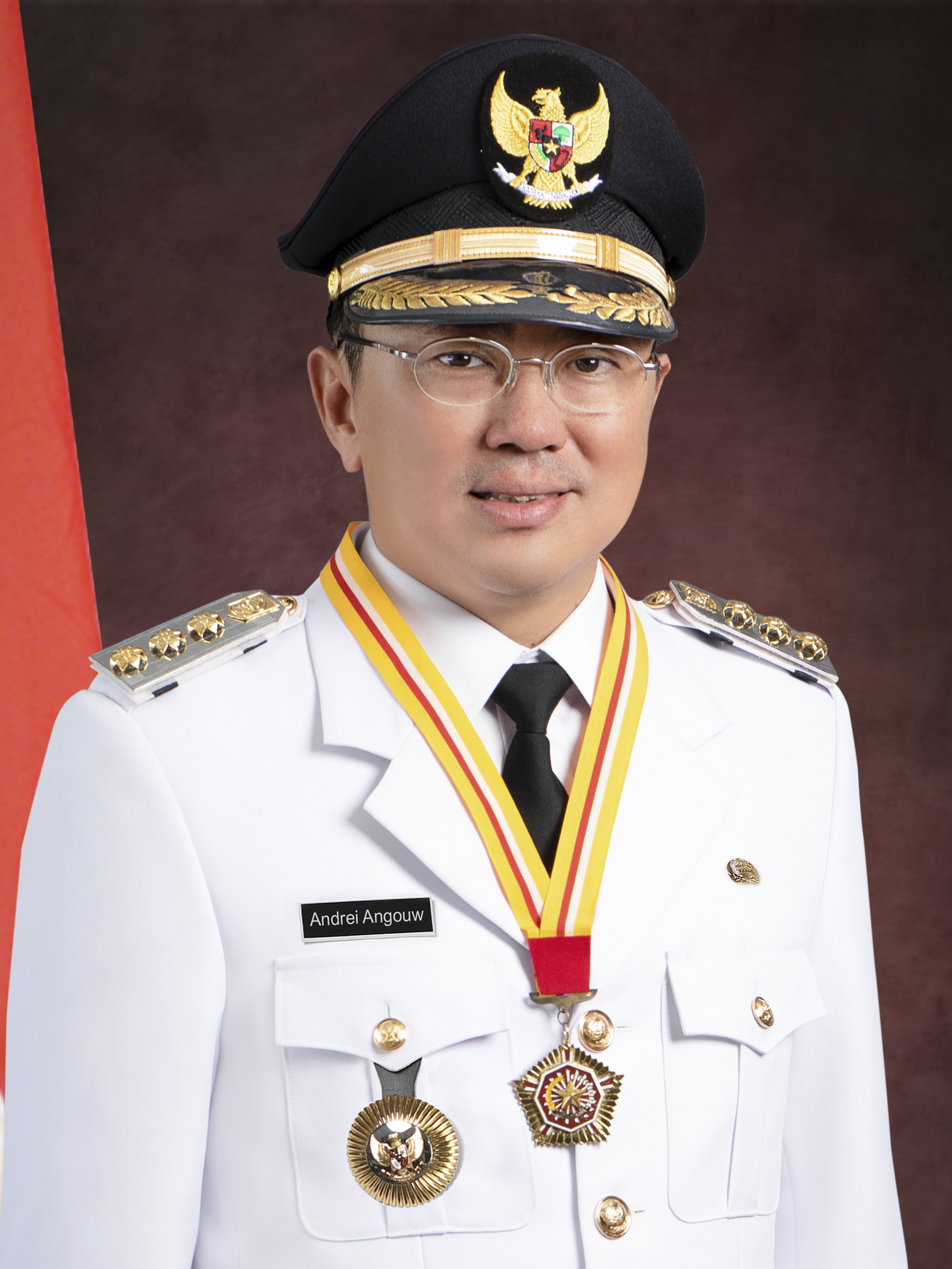
- Official portrait, 2021

19th Mayor of Manado
- Incumbent
- Assumed office 10 May 2021
- Deputy: Richard Sualang
- Preceded by: Vicky Lumentut

Personal details
- Born: 23 May 1971 (age 55) Manado, North Sulawesi
- Party: Indonesian Democratic Party of Struggle
- Education: University of Southern California

Andrei Angouw (born 23 May 1971) is an Indonesian politician from the Indonesian Democratic Party of Struggle (PDI-P) and the incumbent mayor of Manado in North Sulawesi, Indonesia. He previously served as chief speaker of the North Sulawesi provincial parliament between 2016 and 2019. He was elected as the mayor of Manado in 2020, becoming the first Confucian mayor in Indonesia.

== Early life ==
Angouw was born in Manado on 23 May 1971 to a Chinese-Indonesian family. His father, Eddy Angouw, was a professional badminton player from Minahasa Regency. Andrei completed elementary school in 1983 and studied in junior high school until 1986. He then enrolled in a Catholic high school in the city, graduating in 1989. He continued his education at the University of Southern California, earning a Bachelor of Science in industrial and systems engineering in 1992 and a Master of Science in Engineering Management in 1994. Angouw then returned to Indonesia to work as an entrepreneur. He worked at a strategic consulting company between 1994 and 1996 and then at a hotel.

== Political career ==
A member of the Indonesian Democratic Party of Struggle (PDI-P), Angouw's political career started in 2009 when he was elected as a member of the North Sulawesi provincial parliament, representing its 1st electoral district. He was reelected in 2014 as the leader of the parliament's Commission III. In 2016, he became chief speaker of the parliament following the resignation of previous speaker, Steven Kandouw, who ran for vice governor of North Sulawesi. He was the only chief speaker in the Indonesian government from a Confucian background. He was once again reelected to the parliament in 2019.

Angouw decided to run for mayor of Manado in the 2020 elections, with Richard Sualang as his running mate. Previously, the PDI-P had never won a mayoral election in Manado. However, political analysts predicted that despite his background and party, he had a high chance to win, due in part to the popularity of Governor Olly Dondokambey, also from PDI-P, and the party's dominance in legislative elections. He was also known to be personally close to Olly.

During his campaign for mayoralty, he became the target of smear campaigns due to his background as a Confucian and Chinese-Indonesian, such as a rumour that the city would be filled with smoke from Confucian prayers if he won. He won the election with 88,303 votes and was sworn on 10 May 2021. He became the first Confucian in Indonesia to hold office as a mayor.

During his tenure, he transferred the duties of water distribution in the city from PT Air Manado, a private company, to the fully municipal-owned PDAM. He cited the fact only 25% of Manado residents had access to piped water, making it one of the least-covered provincial capitals in Indonesia; the other 75% relied on underground pumps and wells. He aimed to have 70% of the city population connected to the water system by 2024. Most of the water would be sourced from the under-construction Kuwil Reservoir. On 1 January 2022, PT Air Manado was declared to be dissolved and hundreds of employees were laid off. On 17 January 2022, he inaugurated the first EV charging station in North Sulawesi and expressed support for the presence of electric vehicles in Manado.

In January 2022, during the COVID-19 pandemic, Angouw threatened that recipients of aid from Indonesia's national health insurance, PBI-JK, would have their access removed if they did not get vaccinated. At the time of his statement, there were approximately 42,000 unvaccinated people in the city receiving assistance via PBI-JK. He also planned the revitalization of the Bersehati market, the largest market in Manado, in early 2022; however, it was met with objections from some traders in the market, who argued that temporary relocation during the revitalization would hurt their income. He also gave incentive money to religious figures in the city. The program was criticized for several reasons, including inequal distribution that favoured churches with bigger congregations and discrimination towards smaller groups and churches. Ruslan Essa, an imam for Al-Ikhlas Paniki Mosque, cited that the program could disturb religious harmony in the city. Angouw argued that churches and religious figures need to have their followers' data to identify members with criminal records, and they would use the incentive money to rehabilitate said members with help from government bodies. He added that having a bigger congregation result in a bigger responsibility for the members.
