= Ayatullah Saleh =

Indonesian politician

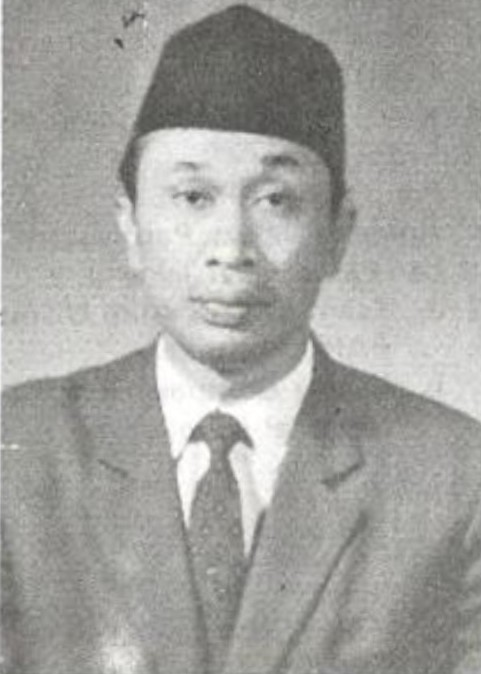

Member of the People's Consultative Assembly
- In office 1 October 1972 – 1 October 1977
- President: Suharto

Deputy Speaker of the Jakarta Regional People's Representative Council
- In office 3 August 1966 – 14 October 1971
- Governor: Ali Sadikin
- Parliamentary group: Nahdlatul Ulama

Acting Leadership of the Jakarta Regional People's Representative Council
- In office 16 April 1966 – 3 August 1966 Serving with Erwin Baharuddin and Moeffreni Moemin
- Governor: Soemarno Sosroatmodjo; Ali Sadikin
- Parliamentary group: Nahdlatul Ulama

Member of the Jakarta Regional People's Representative Council
- In office 16 August 1957 – 14 October 1971
- Governor: Sudiro; Soemarno Sosroatmodjo; Henk Ngantung; Ali Sadikin
- Parliamentary group: Nahdlatul Ulama

Personal details
- Born: February 28, 1928 Klender, Batavia, Dutch East Indies
- Died: February 5, 1992 (aged 63) Jakarta, Indonesia
- Party: Nahdlatul Ulama

Ayatullah Saleh (28 February 1928 – 5 February 1992) was an Indonesian kyai and politician who became the member of the Jakarta Regional People's Representative for fourteen years, the council's deputy speaker from 1966 until 1971, and as the member of the People's Consultative Assembly from 1972 until 1977.

== Early life ==
Ayatullah was born on 28 February 1928 in Duren Sawit, a small community in Batavia, Dutch East Indies. He attended elementary school and dropped out in the 5th grade. He was then brought to Mecca and studied at the Daarul Ulum madrasa until 1941. After that, he returned to Batavia—now renamed to Jakarta—and studied at the Unwanul-Falah madrasa until 1945. In addition to his formal studies in elementary school and madrasas, Ayatullah also took Islamic studies in pesantrens and attend English and typing courses.

After 1945, Ayatullah taught in several schools and madrasas. He also held control over several companies in Klender, Duren Sawit.

== Political career ==
Ayatullah ran as a candidate for the Jakarta Regional People's Representative Council from the Nahdlatul Ulama party in the 1957 Indonesian local elections. He won a seat in the election and was inaugurated as a member of the council on 16 December 1957. Ayatullah still kept his seat following multiple formations and dissolutions of the council.

After the 30 September Movement occurred, members of the Communist Party of Indonesia were purged from government offices, including the Jakarta Regional People's Representative Council. The council experienced leadership vacuum during this period, as Speaker Soemarno Sosroatmodjo, who was also the governor, was purged from his office. Thus, on 16 April 1966, the council unanimously elect Ayatullah and two council members named Erwin Baharuddin and Moeffreni Moe'min to become the acting leadership of the council. After a new governor was elected, Ayatullah was elected as the deputy speaker of the council on 20 July 1966 and was confirmed on 3 August. He represented Islamic groups in the council in his capacity as the deputy speaker.

As the deputy speaker, Ayatullah was appointed as the member of Jakarta's electoral committee for the 1971 Indonesian legislative election. He was tasked with supervising elections in East Jakarta.

Ayatullah became a member of the People's Consultative Assembly after the elections ended, representing Jakarta through the Regional Delegation faction.

== Death ==
Ayatullah died on 5 February 1992 in Jakarta.
