= Herbowo =

Indonesian architect

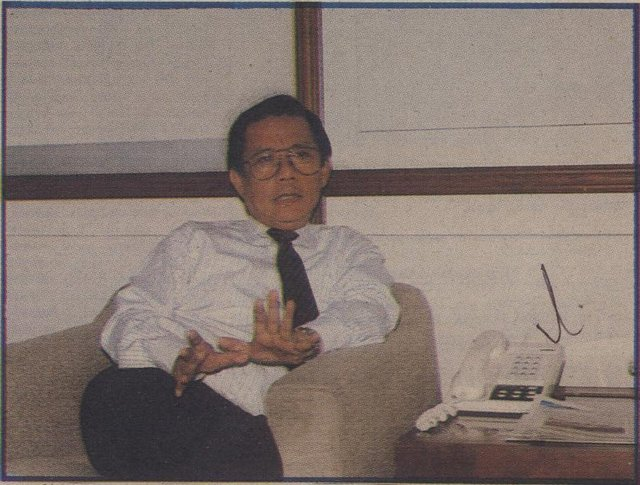

Vice Governor of Jakarta (Economic and Development Affairs)
- In office 31 March 1988 – 25 February 1993
- Governor: Wiyogo Atmodarminto; Soerjadi Soedirdja
- Preceded by: Bunyamin Ramto
- Succeeded by: Tubagus Muhammad Rais

Personal details
- Born: 3 July 1935 (Netherlands) Semarang, Dutch East Indies
- Died: 8 April 2003 (aged 67) Indonesia

Herbowo (1935–2003) was an architect from Indonesia and administrator, He was born in Semarang, Indonesia. Graduated from ITB Institute Technology Bandung in 1960 then post graduated in 1962 from Copenhagen and later was appointed by President of Indonesia Soeharto cq Home Minister to become Vice of Head Government of Jakarta Capital City of Indonesia during 1988. After graduating from Copenhagen, Herbowo started to work at Pulo Mas together with Ir Radinal Moochtar in a company owned by the Government of Jakarta Capital City of Indonesia, later becoming head of Directorat IV during Governor Ali Sadikin dan Head of BAPPEDA. He introduced Route 3 in 1 in Jakarta Capital City.

== Vice of Head Government of Jakarta Capital City of Indonesia ==
Herbowo was Vice of Head Government of Jakarta Capital City of Indonesia as were as involved in the moving of Pekan Raya Jakarta from Jalan Merdeka Selatan was known with Jakarta Fair to Ex Airport Kemayoran, would later named Jakarta International Trade Fair in 1992.
