= Deputy governor of Jakarta =

Administrative post in Indonesia

Deputy Governor of Jakarta
- Deputi Gubernur Jakarta
- Seal of the Province
- Incumbent; Vera Revina Sari (SPE, acting); Busrol Amin (ITT, acting); Marullah Matali (CT) since October 2019 (SPE); 2020 (ITT); 2 December 2022 (CT)
- Appointer: President
- Term length: unspecified
- Formation: 6 March 2009
- First holder: Achmad Harjadi (SPE); Margani M. Mustar (PSC); Soetanto Soehodo (ITT); Aurora Frida Tambunan (CT)
- Deputy: Assistant to the Deputy Governor (SPE, PSC, ITT, CT)

The deputy governor of Jakarta consisted of four officials who is hierarchically under the governor of Jakarta. The deputy governor of Jakarta is tasked to assist the governor of Jakarta in specific tasks. Unlike the vice governor of Jakarta, the deputy governor is appointed by the president of Indonesia with the recommendation of the governor.

== Formation ==
Prior to the formation of the deputy governor, the post of the vice governor of Jakarta was held by multiple officials. Between 1964 and 1966, the post of vice governor was held by two officeholders. From 1966 until 2002, a total of four officeholders held the office. This custom was abolished in 2002, when on 7 October 2002, Governor Sutiyoso was inaugurated along with his single vice governor Fauzi Bowo.

On 30 July 2007, Law No. 29 of 2007 concerning the status of Jakarta was enacted. The law legally established the office of the deputy governor. The position of the deputy governor was further specified in the presidential regulation about the office, tasks, function, and responsibilities of the deputy governor and in the gubernatorial regulation on the same topic.

The office remained unseated for about two years until the inauguration of the deputy governors on 6 March 2009 by Fauzi Bowo.

== Division of work ==
There are four different deputy governors, and each deputy governor is assigned with different tasks.

- Deputy Governor for Spatial Planning and Environment
- Deputy Governor for Population and Settlement Control
- Deputy Governor for Industry, Trade and Transport
- Deputy Governor for Culture and Tourism

== Functions ==
According to the Law No. 29 of 2007, the deputy governor is assigned to assist the governor of Jakarta in the governance of Jakarta.

== List of deputy governors of Jakarta ==
=== Deputy Governor for Spatial Planning and Environment ===
No	Image	Name	Took office	Left office	R
1		Achmad Harjadi	6 March 2009	20 September 2013	
2		Sarwo Handayani	20 September 2013	13 November 2015	
3		Oswar Muadzin Mungkasa	13 November 2015	October 2019	
—		Vera Revina Sari	October 2019	incumbent	

=== Deputy Governor for Population and Settlement Control ===
No	Image	Name	Took office	Left office	R
1		Margani M Mustar	6 March 2009	3 November 2011	
2		Syahrul Effendi	3 November 2011	12 September 2019	
3		Suharti	12 September 2019	24 August 2021	

=== Deputy Governor for Industry, Trade and Transport ===
No	Image	Name	Took office	Left office	Time in office	R
1		Soetanto Soehodo	6 March 2009	2020 (?)	?	
—		Busrol Amin	2020	incumbent	?	

=== Deputy Governor for Culture and Tourism ===
No	Image	Name	Took office	Left office	R
1		Aurora Frida Tambunan	6 March 2009	6 May 2011	
2		Sukesti Martono	6 May 2011	12 September 2019	
3		Sylviana Murni	20 September 2013	4 October 2016	
—		Oswar Muadzin Mungkasa	February 2019	12 September 2019	
4		Dadang Solihin	12 September 2019	1 December 2021	
5		Marullah Matali	2 December 2022	incumbent	
