= National Monument (Indonesia) =

National monument and architectural icon of Jakarta, Indonesia

- Monumen Nasional
- The Monument in 2015
- Interactive map of National Monument
- Location: Jakarta, Indonesia
- Coordinates: 6°10′31.4″S 106°49′37.7″E
- Designer: Friedrich Silaban; Soedarsono
- Type: Obelisk
- Material: Gold leaf, Italian marble
- Height: 132 m (433 ft 1 in)
- Beginning date: 17 August 1961
- Completion date: 12 July 1975
- Opening date: 12 July 1975
- Dedicated to: Commemorate of the Indonesian National Revolution

The National Monument (Indonesian: Monumen Nasional, abbreviated Monas) is a 132 m (433 ft) obelisk in the centre of Merdeka Square, Central Jakarta. It is the national monument of the Republic of Indonesia, built to commemorate the struggle for Indonesian independence. This monument is crowned with a flame covered in gold leaf which symbolizes the burning spirit of struggle of the Indonesian people.

Construction began in 1961 under the direction of President Sukarno, and the monument was opened to the public in 1975. The monument and the museum are open daily from 08:00 to 16:00 Western Indonesia Time (UTC+7) throughout the week except for Mondays when the monument is closed. Since April 2016, the monument is also open during night time, from 19:00 to 22:00 on Tuesdays to Fridays, and from 19:00 to 00:00 on Saturdays and Sundays.

== Background ==
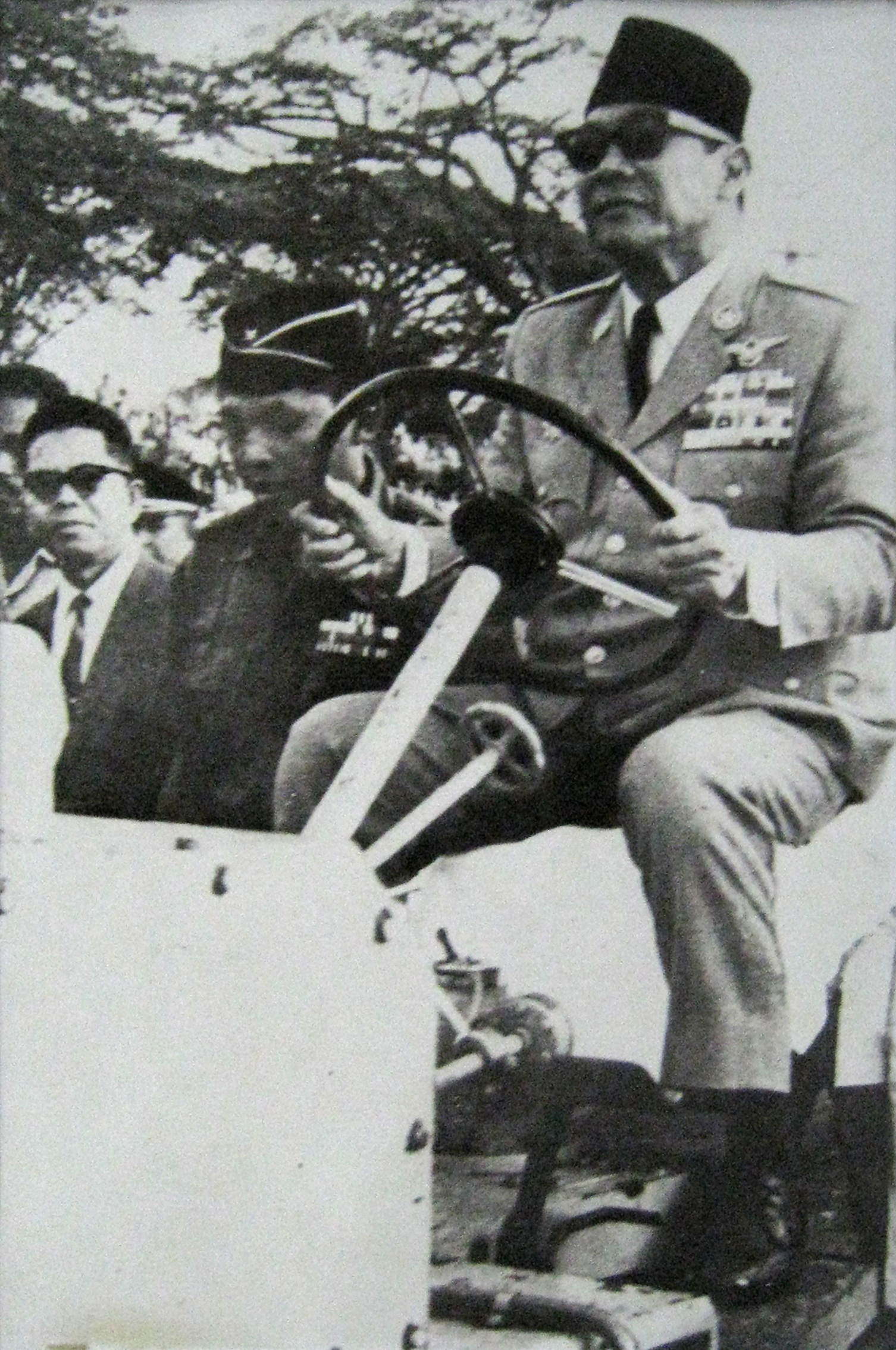
Sukarno inspecting the Monas construction process

After the Indonesian government returned to Jakarta from Yogyakarta in 1950 following the Dutch recognition of Indonesian independence, President Sukarno began to contemplate the construction of a national monument comparable to the Eiffel Tower on the square in front of the Presidential Palace.

On 17 August 1954, a National Monument Committee was established and a design competition was held in 1955. This attracted 51 entries, but only one design, by Friedrich Silaban, met any of the criteria determined by the committee, which included reflecting the character of Indonesia in a building capable of lasting for centuries. A repeat competition was held in 1960, but once again, none of the 136 entries met the criteria.

The chairman of the jury team then asked Silaban to show his design to Sukarno. However, Sukarno did not like the design as he wanted the monument to be in the form of a linga and yoni. Silaban was asked to design such a monument, but his design was for a monument so large that it would have been unaffordable given the economic conditions at the time.

Silaban refused to design a smaller monument, suggesting that construction be delayed until the Indonesian economy improved. Sukarno then asked the architect R.M. Soedarsono to continue with the design. Soedarsono incorporated the numbers 17, 8 and 45, representing 17 August 1945 Proclamation of Indonesian Independence, in the dimensions of the monument. (Note: The height of the goblet yard at the base of the plinth is 17m, the width of the plinth at the base is 8m and the width of the goblet yard is 45m.)

== Construction ==
Construction of Monas

The construction of Monas proceeded in three stages. The first period, from 1961/1962–1964/1965 began with the official start of construction on 17 August 1961 with Sukarno ceremonially driving in the first concrete pile.

A total of 284 piles were used for the foundation block. A further 360 piles were driven in for the museum foundations, with work being completed in March 1962. The walls of the museum in the base were completed by October. Construction of the obelisk then commenced and was finished in August 1963. Work in the second stage, from 1966 to 1968, was delayed by shortages of funding and the aftermath of the 30 September Movement coup attempt.

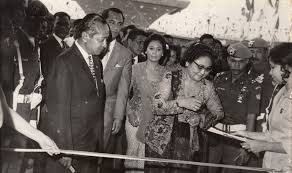
President Suharto and Mrs. Tien Suharto inaugurated the National Monument behind them, the Governor of DKI Jakarta Ali Sadikin and his wife

In the final phase, from 1969 to 1976, the dioramas for the historical museum were added. Problems remained once construction was complete, and work was needed to solve problems with water leaking into the museum. Monas was officially opened to the public on 12 July 1975. The location of Monas is known as Merdeka Square.

== Description ==
=== Design ===
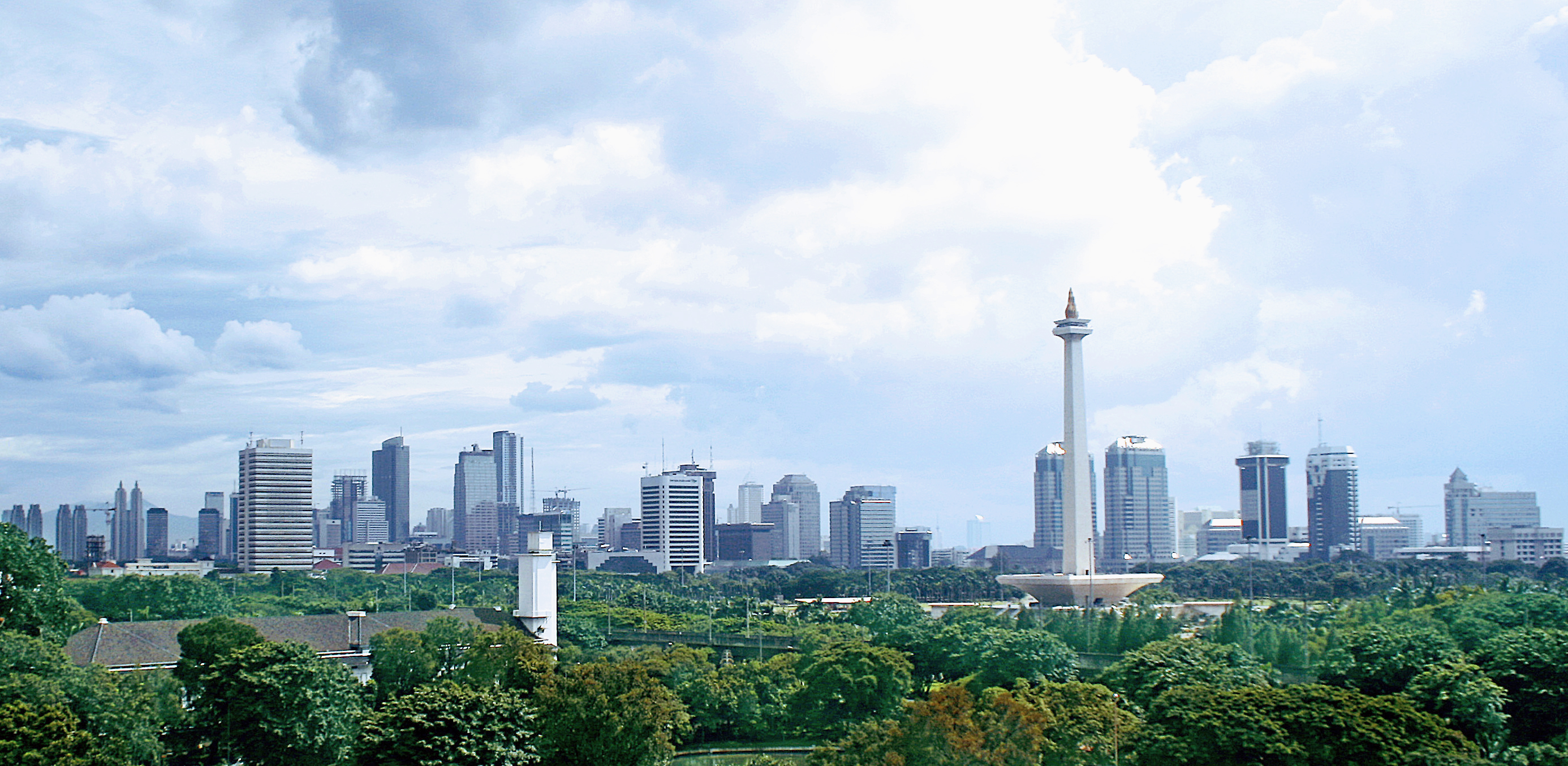
"Monas" and the Jakarta skyline

The towering monument encapsulates the philosophy of Lingga and Yoni. Lingga resembles an alu rice pestle and Yoni resembles a lesung rice mortar, two important traditional Indonesian tools. Lingga and Yoni also symbolize harmony, balance, fertility and eternal life with the lingga phallic symbol, representing masculinity, positive elements, and daytime and the Yoni the female organs symbol, representing femininity, negative elements, and night.

It also resembles the bloom of the famous Amorphophallus titanum, native to Indonesia. Indeed, fiberglass Amorphophallus and Rafflesia sculptures were once installed around the monument.

The monument consists of a 117.7m obelisk on a 45m square platform at a height of 17m, the goblet yard. The obelisk itself is clad with Italian marble.

The northern pond measuring 25×25 m was designed to cool water for the air conditioning system of Monas as well as to enhance the beauty of the surrounding area. To the north, there is a statue of Indonesia national hero Prince Diponegoro by Italian sculptor Cobertaldo.

=== Reliefs of Indonesian history ===
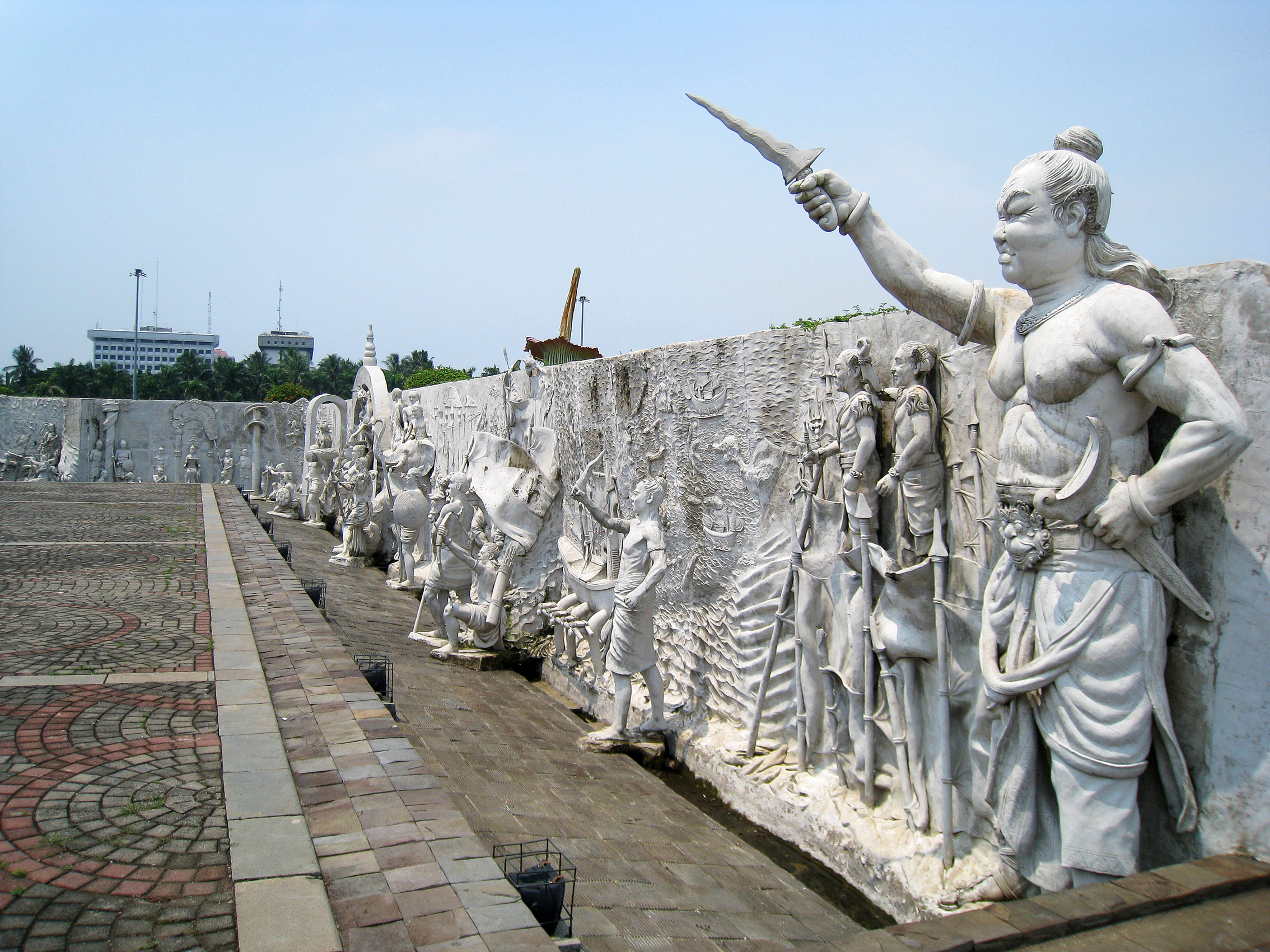
Relief of Indonesian history

In the outer yard surrounding Monas there are reliefs of Indonesian history. The story begins in the northeastern corner and describes events during eras such as the Singhasari and Majapahit empires. The reliefs extend along the four walls showing the European colonialization of the Indonesian archipelago, various popular local uprisings, modern Indonesian organizations in the early 20th century, the Japanese occupation in World War II, the Proclamation of Independence, and post-independence developments. The reliefs were made from molded cement although several of the statues are damaged and have decayed due to weathering.

=== The National History Museum ===
The Indonesian National History Museum has a display of dioramas in the large marble-lined hall below Monas. There are a total of 51 dioramas around the walls and in the centre of the hall.

The dioramas begin in the northeastern corner, displaying the scenes from Indonesian history from the beginning during the earliest days of Prehistoric Indonesia, the construction of Borobudur, the Sriwijaya and Majapahit eras, followed with events from the period of European colonization and uprisings against Dutch East Indies Company and Dutch East Indies rule.

The dioramas continue well into the 20th century showing the Japanese occupation, the proclamation of Indonesian independence in 1945, the struggle for independence of Indonesian revolution, and on to events during the New Order era of Suharto's regime.

=== The Hall of Independence ===
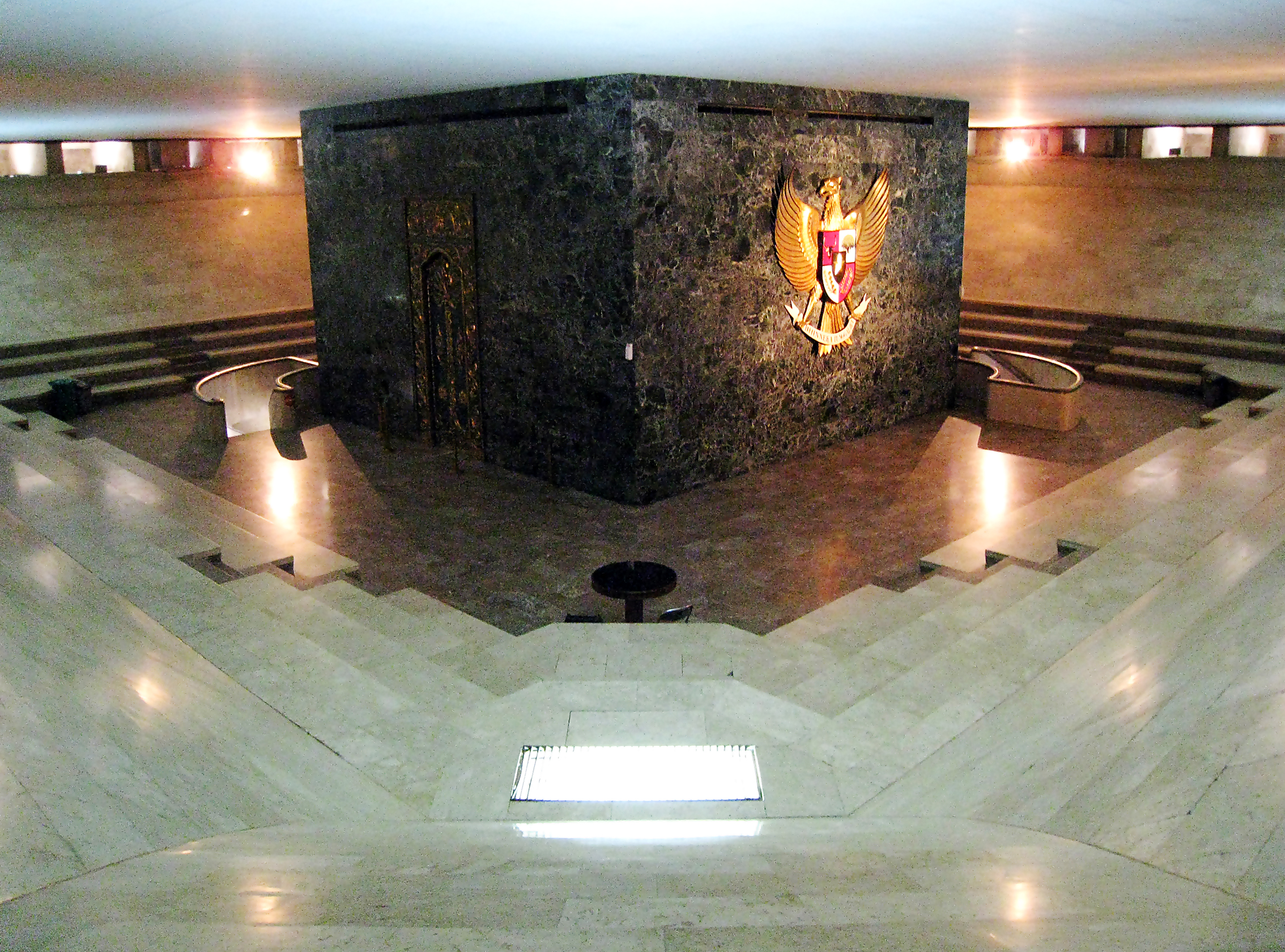
Hall of Independence, Gate of Independence in the left wall and Garuda Pancasila the right side

The Hall of Independence (Indonesian: Ruang Kemerdekaan) is situated inside the goblet or "cup" part of Monas (Indonesian: Cawan). The hall, which contains various symbols of independence, can be reached through spiral stairs at the north and south doors. The original text of the Proclamation of Independence is stored in a glass case inside the bronze door. On the west side of the inner wall. Mechanized bronze doors weigh 4 tons and are coated with gold leaf adorned with the image of a Wijaya Kusuma flower, symbolizing eternity, and a lotus flower, symbolizing purity. The doors, known as Gerbang Kemerdekaan or the Gate of Independence, open slowly while the nationalist Padamu Negeri song plays followed by a recording of Sukarno reading the text of the Proclamation. On the southern wall there is a large bronze gold-coated statue of the coat of arms of Indonesia weighing 3.5 tons. On the eastern side is the text of the proclamation in bronze lettering. Originally the eastern side displayed the most sacred Indonesian flag, Sang Saka Merah Putih, originally raised on 17 August 1945. However, because it is fragile and in poor condition it is no longer displayed. The wall on the northern side displays a map of the Indonesian archipelago coated in gold.

There is a middle platform on top of the cawan (goblet) which provides visitors with views from a height of 17 metres. This middle platform is accessible through the elevator on the way down from the main observation deck (the lift stops on the way down at the cawan to allow visitors to exit) or through stairs from below.

=== The Observation Deck and Flame of Independence ===
A lift on the southern side carries visitors to the viewing platform at a height of 115 metres above ground level. The capacity of the elevator is about 11 people. The top platform can accommodate about 50 people. There is also a staircase for use in emergencies. The total height of the monument is 132 metres. The distance from the viewing platform to the tip of the flame is 17 metres. The ticket to observation deck is Rp.10,000 (adults, 2016).

Monas on the coat of arms of Jakarta

Monas is topped by a 14.5 ton bronze Flame of Independence containing the lift engine. The base of the flame, in the shape of a goblet, is 3 metres high. The bronze flame structure measures 14 metres in height and 6 metres in diameter, It consists of 77 sections. Originally the bronze flame structure was covered with 35 kg of gold leaf. For the 50th anniversary of Indonesian independence in 1995, the gold leaf was reapplied and increased to 50 kg of gold.

== Visitation ==
The observation desk and other facilities are open daily from 08.00 to 15.00 daily (except for Mondays; as of August 2022). The entrance to Monas is located around 100 meters from the northern side of the monument. Visitors must enter by steps leading to a tunnel which leads back towards the base of the Monas. There is a ticket office (Rp 5,000 for adults, Rp 2,000 for children, 2016) at the end of the tunnel to provide tickets that allows access to the National History Museum, diorama displays, as well as several other parts of the area.To access the observation deck, a different ticket must be bought for RP10,000 or adults (2016) and may be purchased at a second booth after passing through the hall that displays dioramas.

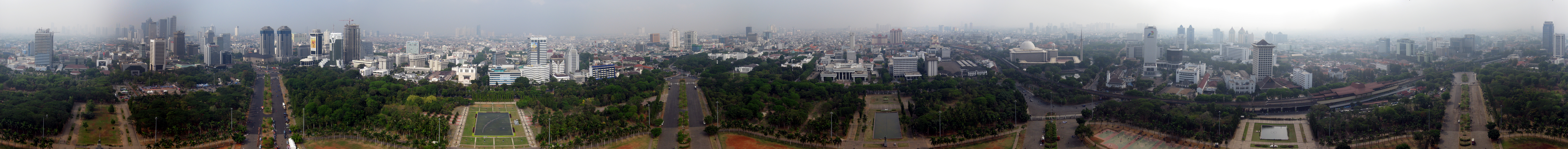
The view of Central Jakarta from the Monas viewing tower

== Gallery ==
View of monument and square

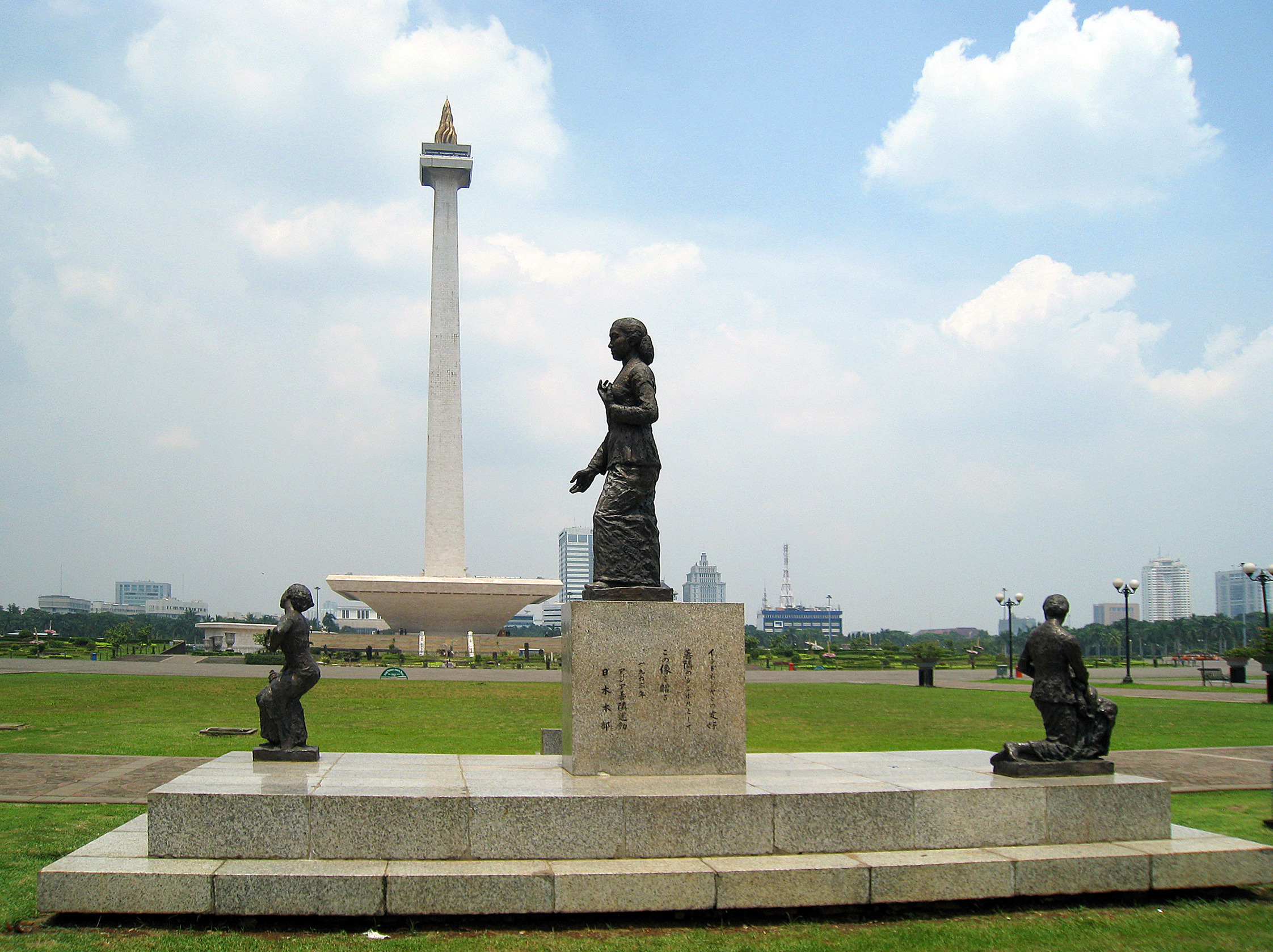
Kartini statue, hero of Indonesian women's emancipation

== See also ==
- Juche Tower, a similarly designed monument-tower in Pyongyang, North Korea, topped with flame statue and elevator ride to the top observation deck.
- Washington Monument in Washington DC, an obelisk erected to commemorate George Washington.
- Tugu Pahlawan in Surabaya, a similarly design ten sided obelisk to commemorate Heroes of Battle of Surabaya.
- Tugu Muda in Semarang.
- National Press Monument in Surakarta.
- List of museums and cultural institutions in Indonesia
