= Vice Governor of Jakarta =

Elected deputy governor or Jakarta

Vice Governor of the Special Capital Region of Jakarta
- Wakil Gubernur Daerah Khusus Ibukota Jakarta
- Coat of arms of Jakarta

- Flag of Jakarta (non-civil)

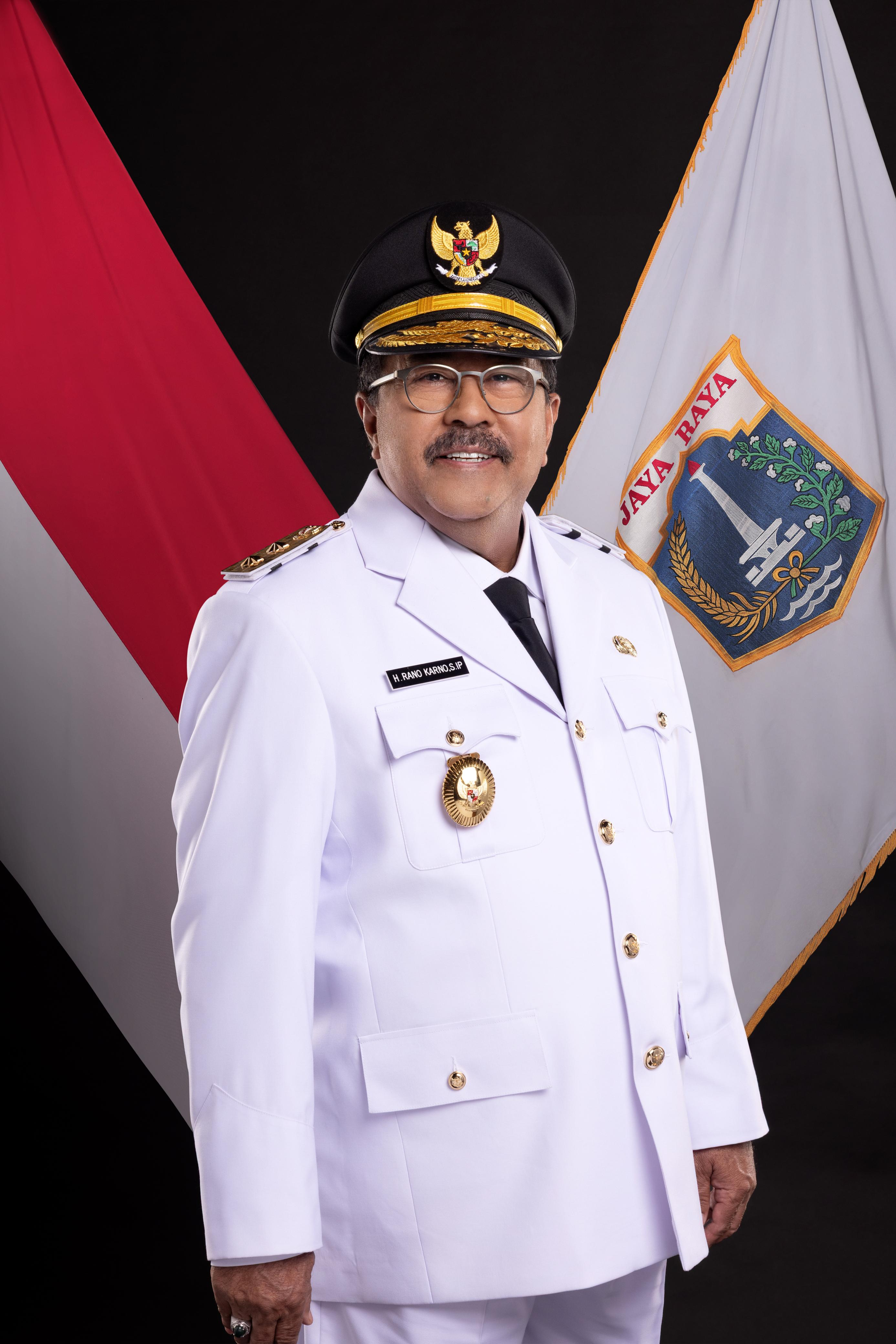
- Incumbent; Rano Karno since 20 February 2025
- Residence: Official Residence of the Deputy Governor of the Special Capital Region of Jakarta, Menteng, Central Jakarta
- Term length: Five years, renewable once
- Inaugural holder: Henk Ngantung
- Formation: 29 January 1960; 66 years ago
- Website: www.jakarta.go.id

The vice governor of Jakarta (Indonesian: Wakil Gubernur Jakarta) is an elected politician who, along with the governor and 106 members of the Jakarta Regional House of Representatives, is accountable for the strategic government of Jakarta. The city is administratively equal to a province with special status as the capital of Indonesia. Hence, the executive head of Jakarta is a governor, instead of a mayor.

== List of vice governors ==
=== 1960–1966 ===
The first vice governor, Henk Ngantung, was inaugurated along with his Governor, Soemarno Sosroatmodjo. Soemarno was later dismissed following his appointment as the Minister of Internal Affairs, and was replaced by Henk. Henk inaugurated two vice governors to replace his position.

| No | Image | Name | Took office | Left office | Time in office | R |
|---|---|---|---|---|---|---|
| 1 | | Henk Ngantung | 29 January 1960 | 26 August 1964 | 4 years, 210 days | |
| 2 | | Soewondo | 17 October 1964 | 19 January 1966 | 1 year, 94 days | |
| 2 | | Satoto Hoepoedio | 17 October 1964 | 19 January 1966 | 1 year, 94 days | |

=== 1966–2002 ===
After the dismissal of the two vice governors, the government reorganized the job description of the vice governors. The position for the vice governors were added into four and were assigned to handle different affairs. From 1966 to 1984, and from 1997 to 2002, the vice governors were assigned to handle these affairs:

- government and security
- welfare
- economy
- development

In 1984, the four vice governors who handed these affairs were dismissed, and were replaced by three vice governors instead. The economy and development affairs were merged into a single vice governor. This merger was reversed in 1997.

==== Vice Governor for Government and Security Affairs ====
| No | Image | Name | Took office | Left office | Time in office | R |
|---|---|---|---|---|---|---|
| 1 | | Soewondo | 7 February 1966 | 13 May 1966 | 95 days | |
| 2 | | Wiriadinata | 13 May 1966 | 26 January 1979 | 12 years, 258 days | |
| 3 | | Abdul Chourmain | 26 January 1979 | 5 April 1984 | 5 years, 70 days | |
| 4 | | Eddie Marzuki Nalapraya | 5 April 1984 | 19 December 1987 | 3 years, 258 days | |
| 5 | | Basofi Sudirman | 19 December 1987 | 12 May 1993 | 5 years, 144 days | |
| 6 | | Muhammad Idroes | 19 July 1993 | 25 September 1997 | 4 years, 68 days | |
| 7 | | Abdul Kahfi | 25 September 1997 | 7 October 2002 | 5 years, 12 days | |

==== Vice Governor for Welfare Affairs ====
| No | Image | Name | Took office | Left office | Time in office | R |
|---|---|---|---|---|---|---|
| 1 | | Soewondo | 13 May 1966 | 5 January 1974 | 7 years, 237 days | |
| 2 | | Urip Widodo | 5 January 1974 | 26 January 1979 | 5 years, 21 days | |
| 3 | | Sardjono Soeprapto | 26 January 1979 | 5 April 1984 | 5 years, 70 days | |
| 4 | | Anwar Ilmar | 5 April 1984 | 8 August 1991 | 7 years, 125 days | |
| 5 | | Susilo Museno | 8 August 1991 | 25 September 1997 | 6 years, 48 days | |
| 6 | | Djailani | 25 September 1997 | 7 October 2002 | 5 years, 12 days | |

==== Vice Governor for Economic and Development Affairs ====
| No | Image | Name | Took office | Left office | Time in office | R |
|---|---|---|---|---|---|---|
| 1 | | Sapi'ie (Economy) | 7 February 1966 | 26 January 1979 | 12 years, 353 days | |
| 1 | | Prajogo Padmowihardjo (Development) | 7 February 1966 | 26 January 1979 | 12 years, 353 days | |
| 2 | | Asmawi Manaf (Economy) | 26 January 1979 | 5 April 1984 | 5 years, 70 days | |
| 2 | | Piek Mulyadi (Development) | 26 January 1979 | 5 April 1984 | 5 years, 70 days | |
| 3 | | Bunyamin Ramto | 5 April 1984 | 31 March 1988 | 3 years, 361 days | |
| 4 | | Herbowo | 31 March 1988 | 25 February 1993 | 4 years, 331 days | |
| 5 | | Tubagus Muhammad Rais | 25 February 1993 | 4 November 1997 | 4 years, 252 days | |
| 6 | | Harun Al Rasyid (Economy) | 4 November 1997 | 1998 | ± 1 year | |
| 6 | | Fauzi Alvie Yasin (Economy) | 1999 | 2002 | ± 3 years | |
| 6 | | Boedihardjo Soekmadi (Development) | 1997 | 2002 | ± 5 years | |

=== Since 2002 ===
Under Governor Sutiyoso, the tradition of having multiple vice governors was abolished, and on 7 October 2002, he and his vice governor, Fauzi Bowo, was inaugurated together.

| No | Image | Name | Took office | Left office | Time in office | Governor(s) | R |
|---|---|---|---|---|---|---|---|
| 1 | | Fauzi Bowo | 7 October 2002 | 7 October 2007 | 5 years, 0 days | Sutiyoso | |
| 2 | | Prijanto | 7 October 2007 | 7 October 2012 | 5 years | Fauzi Bowo | |
| Vacant | | | 7 October 2012 | 15 October 2012 | | Fadjar Panjaitan (acting) | |
| 3 | | Basuki Tjahaja Purnama | 15 October 2012 | 16 October 2014 | 2 years, 1 day | Joko Widodo | |
| Vacant | | | 16 October 2014 | 19 November 2014 | | Basuki Tjahaja Purnama (acting) | |
| Vacant | | | 19 November 2014 | 17 December 2014 | | Basuki Tjahaja Purnama | |
| 4 | | Djarot Saiful Hidayat | 17 December 2014 | 9 May 2017 | 2 years, 143 days | Basuki Tjahaja Purnama | |
| Vacant | | | 9 May 2017 | 15 June 2017 | | Djarot Saiful Hidayat (acting) | |
| Vacant | | | 15 June 2017 | 15 October 2017 | | Djarot Saiful Hidayat | |
| Vacant | | | 15 October 2017 | 16 October 2017 | | Saefullah (acting) | |
| 5 | | Sandiaga Uno | 16 October 2017 | 18 September 2018 | 337 days | Anies Baswedan | |
| Vacant | | | 18 September 2018 | 15 April 2020 | | Anies Baswedan | |
| 6 | | Ahmad Riza Patria | 15 April 2020 | 16 October 2022 | 2 years, 184 days | Anies Baswedan | |
| Vacant | | | 16 October 2022 | 18 October 2024 | | Heru Budi Hartono (acting) | |
| Vacant | | | 18 October 2024 | 20 February 2025 | | Teguh Setyabudi (acting) | |
| 7 | | Rano Karno | 20 February 2025 | Incumbent | 1 year, 200 days | Pramono Anung | |
