= Soeprapto (governor) =

Indonesian politician (1924–2009)

Raden Soeprapto
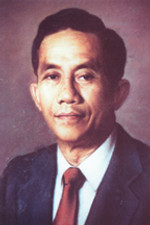
- Soeprapto, 1982

6th Governor of Jakarta
- In office 1982–1987
- Preceded by: Tjokropranolo
- Succeeded by: Wiyogo Atmodarminto

Personal details
- Born: 12 August 1924 Surakarta, Dutch East Indies
- Died: 26 September 2009 (aged 85) Jakarta, Indonesia

Military service
- Allegiance: Indonesia
- Branch/service: Indonesian Army
- Years of service: 1945–1982
- Rank: Lieutenant General

Raden Soeprapto (EYD: Raden Suprapto; 12 August 1924 – 26 September 2009) was an Indonesian military figure and politician who served as the 8th Governor of Jakarta from 29 September 1982 until 6 October 1987.

== Early life and education ==
=== Early life ===
Raden Soeprapto was born in Surakarta, Central Java, on 12 August 1924.

=== Education ===
Soeprapto attended elementary school in 1937, then continued his education at SLP in 1940 and SLA in 1943. Soeprapto continued his education in Peta in 1943, Advanced Officer Course One (Kupaltu) in 1954, Advanced Officer Course Two (Kupalda) in 1959, Army Command and Staff College in 1964, and the United States Command and General Staff College (USCGEC), in 1967.

== Military service ==
Meanwhile, the positions that Soeprapto had held in the military sphere included Commander of the Infantry Troops, Deputy Battalion Commander, Assistant to Personnel of Kodam VII Diponegoro, Assistant to Operations for Kodam VII/Diponegoro, Chief of Staff of Kodam XVII Cenderawasih, Commander of the XVII Udayana Regional Military Command.

== Governor of Jakarta ==
=== Tenure ===
He started his leadership by proposing a pragmatic and clean concept about the development of Jakarta as a capital city that is starting to become a big city. While serving as the governor of DKI Jakarta, the population of the capital city was close to 7 million people and the city's development was growing rapidly. The basic policies that are philosophically applied are openness, re-functionalization of the apparatus, firmness and fostering discipline of the apparatus and society.

The concepts emphasized are stability, security, and order. In addition, Soeprapto also made the DKI Jakarta Master Plan for the period 1985–2005, which is now known as the General Spatial Plan and the City Area Section Plan. Soeprapto's thought which is quite monumental and is still felt today is the construction of the Soekarno-Hatta international airport, in the Cengkareng area, West Jakarta (now in the Tangerang area). This airport also converts the previous airports in Kemayoran and Halim Perdana Kusuma.

== Death ==
He died in Jakarta on Saturday, 26 September 2009 at 01.00 WIB at the age of 85 years. He was buried on the same day at the Giritama Cemetery, Parung, Bogor, West Java.

== Gallery ==
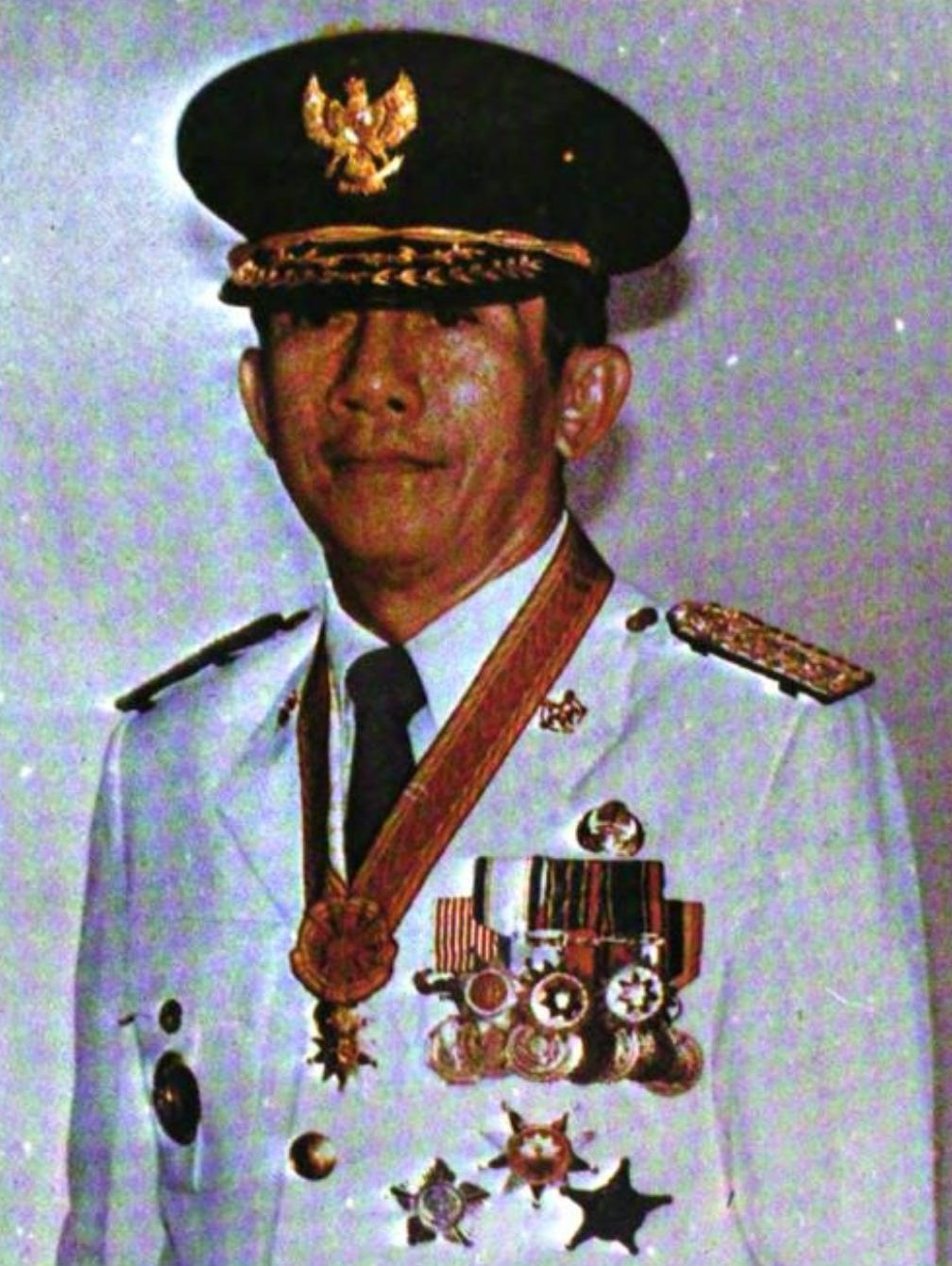
Soeprapto in 1984
