= Basuki Rahmat =

Indonesian general (1921–1969)

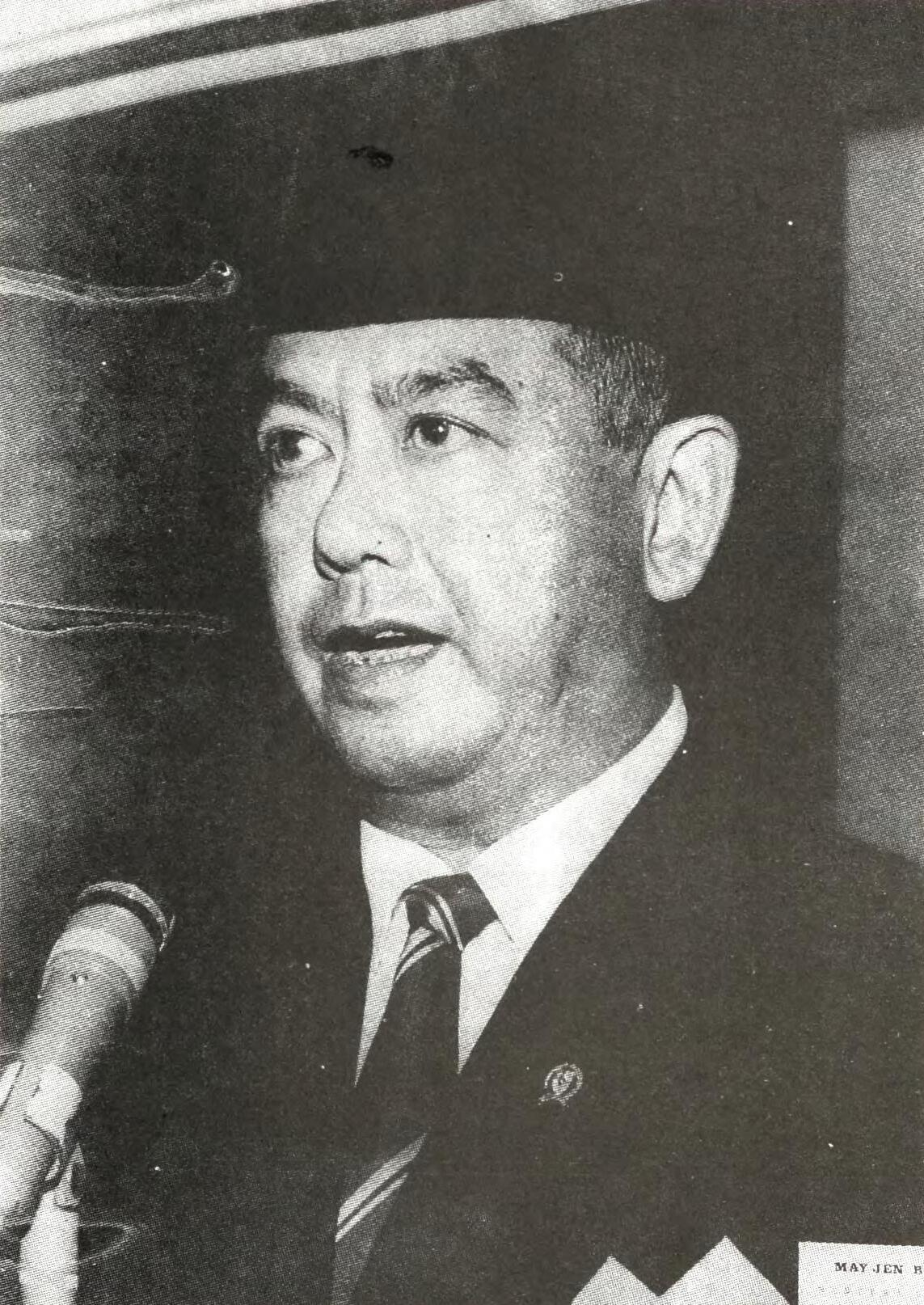

16th Minister of Home Affairs
- In office 18 March 1966 – 9 January 1969; Ad Interim: 18 – 28 March 1966
- President: Sukarno; Suharto
- Preceded by: Soemarno Sosroatmodjo
- Succeeded by: Amir Machmud

Acting Governor of Jakarta
- In office 18 March 1966 – 28 April 1966
- Preceded by: Soemarno Sosroatmodjo
- Succeeded by: Ali Sadikin

Personal details
- Born: 4 November 1921 Tuban, Dutch East Indies
- Died: 8 January 1969 (aged 47) Jakarta, Indonesia

Military service
- Allegiance: Empire of Japan (1943–1945); Indonesia (1945–1967)
- Branch/service: PETA (1943–1945); Indonesian Army (1945–1967)
- Years of service: 1943–1967
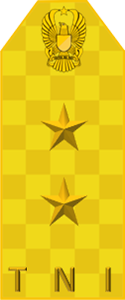
- Rank: Major General
- Unit: Infantry

Major General (Ret) Basuki Rahmat (4 November 1921 – 8 January 1969) was an Indonesian general, National Hero and a witness to the signing of the Supersemar document transferring power from President Sukarno to General Suharto.

He was born in Tuban, East Java, and became a source of great pride for its people. His name has been commemorated as the name of a major street in nearly every city in Indonesia.

== Early life ==
Basuki Rahmat was born on 4 November 1921 in Tuban, East Java. His father, Raden Soedarsono Soenodihardjo, was assistant to a local district chief. His mother, Soeratni, died in January 1925 when Basuki was only four years old, ten days after giving birth to his brother. When he was seven, Basuki was sent to elementary school. In 1932 his father died, resulting in a temporary halt to Basuki's education. He was sent to live with his paternal aunt and finished his education, graduating from junior high school in 1939 and from the Yogyakarta Muhammadiyah school in 1942, just as the Japanese invasion of Indonesia started.

== Military career ==
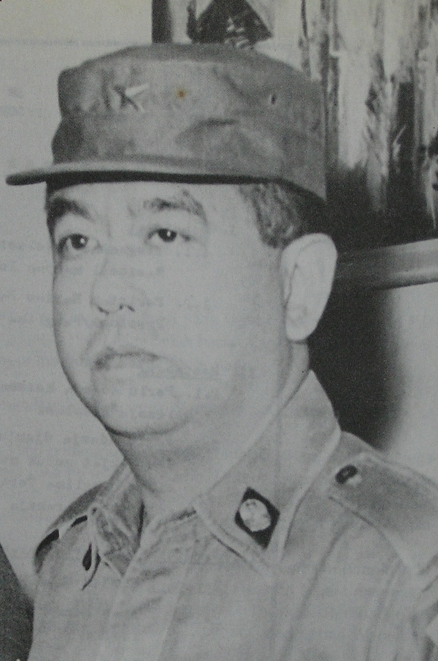
Basuki Rahmat

In 1943, during the Japanese occupation of the Dutch East Indies, Basuki joined the Defenders of the Motherland Army (PETA), an auxiliary force run by the Japanese to train extra soldiers in the case of an allied invasion of Java. In PETA, Basuki rose to become a company commander.

With the Proclamation of Independence on 17 August 1945 by Nationalist leaders Sukarno and Mohammad Hatta, Basuki, like many other youths began to band into militias in preparation for the formation of an Indonesian Army. On 5 October 1945, the People's Security Army (TKR) was formed, with Basuki enlisting with TKR the same month in the town of Ngawi in his native province of East Java. There he was stationed with KODAM VII/Brawijaya (then known as Military Territory V/Brawijaya), the military command charged with the security of East Java.

At this Kodam, Basuki served as a battalion commander at Ngawi (1945–1946), battalion commander at Ronggolawe (1946–1950), regimental commander stationed at Bojonegoro (1950–1953), chief of staff to the commander of Military Territory V/Brawijaya (1953–1956) and acting commander of Military Territory V/Brawijaya (1956).

In September 1956, Basuki was transferred to Melbourne, Australia to serve as a military attache to the embassy there. Basuki returned to Indonesia in November 1959 and served as Assistant IV/Logistics to Army Chief of Staff Abdul Haris Nasution.

Basuki returned to KODAM VII/Brawijaya in 1960, serving as chief of staff before finally becoming regional commanding general in 1962.

== G30S and murder of generals ==
By 1965, there was a great deal of political tension in Indonesia, especially between the Army and the Communist Party of Indonesia (PKI). The PKI, which had slowly been gaining a footing in Indonesian politics, was now set to become the most powerful political party because of their association with President Sukarno. In September 1965, Basuki grew wary of communist activities in East Java and went to Jakarta to report his observations to the Commander of the Army, Ahmad Yani. They met on the evening of 30 September when Basuki met with Yani and reported of the goings on in his province. Yani complimented Basuki on the report and wanted him to accompany him to his meeting with the president the following morning to relay his story of Communist activities.

The next morning on 1 October, Basuki was contacted by the Army Headquarters and notified of the kidnapping of the generals, including Yani, whom he had expected to be back in the palace as promised but ended up dead in his house. Hearing this, Basuki together with an aide went in a car and took a drive around the city to check what was going on. As he was driving, Basuki noticed his troops from East Java, the 530th Infantry Battalion guarding the Presidential Palace and was even more surprised that they were not wearing any divisional patches nor rank insignia. After being advised against approaching them by his aide, Basuki drove back to his accommodation where he was informed that he was needed at the Kostrad headquarters.

Basuki went to the Kostrad headquarters to find that the commander of Kostrad, Major General Suharto, had decided to assume the leadership of the Army and take control of the situation. From Suharto, Basuki found out that a movement calling themselves the 30 September Movement had used the troops to occupy strategic points in Jakarta. Suharto then told Basuki that he needed him to negotiate the troops into surrendering before 6 pm or else he would use force. This, Basuki conveyed to the 530th Battalion who treated him with the utmost respect. Basuki was successful and by 4 pm, the 530th Battalion, in the presence of Kostrad forces, surrendered.

During the day, the G30S Movement made an announcement of a Revolutionary Council on radio. Among the names listed was that of Basuki. This was not an isolated incident as many anti-Communist general officers such as Umar Wirahadikusumah (then commander, Kodam V/Jaya) and Amir Machmud were also listed on this council. Basuki was quick to deny the appointment.

Also during the day and unbeknownst to Basuki a meeting was held in Halim Perdanakusuma Airport between Sukarno, Commander of the Air Force AVM Omar Dhani, Commander of the Navy Rear Admiral RE Martadinata, and Chief of the National Police General Sucipto Judodiharjo to appoint a new Army Commander. Although it was Major General Pranoto Reksosamudra who would be appointed Commander of the Army to fill the by now vacant post, Basuki's name was briefly considered. It was quickly dismissed by Sukarno who joked that Basuki would always be taken ill when the occasion needed him.

After 1 October, all the fingers pointed the blame at PKI and all over Indonesia, especially in Java, movements began to be formed with the aim of crushing PKI. For his part, Basuki returned to East Java to supervise the anti-PKI movements there.

On 16 October 1965, a rally was held in Surabaya during which a United Action Command consisting of various political parties was formed.

Although he had encouraged the political parties to join the United Action Command, Basuki did not commit his troops into cracking down on PKI as readily as all the other commanders did. During the first weeks of a nationwide crackdown on PKI, nothing happened in the East Java capital of Surabaya. This lack of commitment together with the listing of Basuki's name as part of the Revolutionary Council caused many to suspect that Basuki was a PKI sympathizer. It needed some force from his staff before Basuki froze pro-PKI activities in Surabaya and East Java

In November 1965, Basuki was transferred to Jakarta and became a staff member for Suharto who was now the Commander of the Army, taking on the position of deputy chief of staff for finance and civil relations. Basuki also become active as a member of the Social-Political Committee (Panitia Sospol), the Army political think-tank which Suharto set up after he had become Commander of the Army.

In February 1966, in a Cabinet Reshuffle, Basuki was named Minister of Veterans' Affairs. In this duty he was tasked to ensure veterans' concerns would be addressed in light of the worsening economic situation.

== Supersemar ==
On 11 March 1966, Basuki attended a cabinet meeting at the Merdeka Palace, the first since Sukarno reshuffled the cabinet at the end of February. The meeting had not been underway long before Sukarno, after receiving a note from the commander of his bodyguards, suddenly left the room. When the meeting was over, Basuki and the Minister of Industry, Mohammad Jusuf, went outside the palace complex to join Amirmachmud, by now the commander of KODAM V/Jaya replacing then Kostrad commanding general Umar Wirahadikusumah. Basuki was then updated on what had happened and was informed that Sukarno had left for Bogor by helicopter because it was not secure in Jakarta.

Jusuf suggested that the three of them go to Bogor to provide moral support for Sukarno. The other two generals agreed and together, the three left to Bogor after asking for Suharto's permission. According to Amirmachmud, Suharto asked the three generals to tell Sukarno of his readiness to restore security, should the president order it.

At Bogor, the three met with Sukarno who was unhappy with the security and with Amirmachmud's insistence that everything was secure. Sukarno then began discussing options with the three Generals before finally Sukarno then began discussing options with Basuki, Jusuf, and Amirmachmud before finally asking them how he can take care of the situation. Basuki and Jusuf were silent, but Amirmachmud suggested that Sukarno give Suharto some powers and govern Indonesia with him so that everything could be secured. The meeting then disbanded as Sukarno began preparing a Presidential Decree.

It was dusk when the Decree that would become Supersemar was finally prepared and awaiting Sukarno's signature. Sukarno had some last minute doubts but Jusuf, together with the two Generals and Sukarno's inner circle in the Cabinet who had also made the trip to Bogor encouraged him to sign. Sukarno finally signed the letter. As the most senior out of the three Generals, Basuki was entrusted with the letter and ordered to pass it on to Suharto. That night, the three Generals immediately went to the Kostrad Headquarters and Basuki handed the letter to Suharto.

There was controversy over Basuki's role in Supersemar. One account states that four generals had gone to Bogor, the fourth general being Maraden Panggabean. This account stated that together with Panggabean, Basuki held Sukarno at gun point and forced him to sign a pre-prepared Supersemar which Jusuf had carried with him inside a pink folder

On 13 March, Sukarno summoned Basuki, Jusuf, and Amirmachmud. Sukarno was angry that Suharto had banned the PKI and told the three Generals that Supersemar did not contain such instructions. Sukarno then ordered that a letter be produced to clarify the contents of Supersemar but nothing ever came up apart from the copies that former Cuban Ambassador, AM Hanafi collected.

== New Order ==
The handing of Supersemar gave Suharto de facto executive powers, and he soon began establishing a Cabinet more favorable to him. Basuki served as Minister of Home Affairs, starting with Suharto's first Cabinet in March 1966 to the one which he named in June 1968 when he was officially the president.

== Death ==
Basuki died on 8 January 1969 while still holding his office as Minister of Home Affairs. He was replaced by Amir Machmud in this position.
