= Coat of arms of Jakarta =

Versions
- The original coat of arms, with the motto "DJAJA RAJA" instead of "JAYA RAYA". (Note: Due to the asymmetrical form, the original emblem was never used. Note that the law adopting the emblem with the spelling "DJAJA RAJA" did not use the motto "DJAJA RAJA" at its header, but instead used the motto "JAYA RAYA".)
- Armiger: Jakarta
- Adopted: 26 June 1963; 15 July 1964 (motto spelling changed)
- Shield: Azure, the National Monument proper, surrounded by a garland of paddy and cotton. In base two waves Argent; and a chief Argent with the words Jaya Raya (Victorious and Great), Gules.
- Motto: Jaya Raya (Victorious and Great)
- Earlier version(s): 1911–1942; 1947–1949 (as Batavia); 1951–1963 (as Djakarta)

The Coat of arms of Jakarta is the official coat of arms of Jakarta. The coat of arms depicts the National Monument and a gold-and-white paddy and cotton.

== History ==
=== Dutch East Indies ===
Coat of arms of Batavia (now Jakarta) during Dutch colonial era, this version adopted from 1930 to 1951.

Prior to the independence of Indonesia, Jakarta was named Batavia. The first coat of arms of Batavia was officially adopted on 8 February 1911. The arms consisted of a red shield with a blue sword surrounded by a brown laurel wreath, supported by lions holding a sword and arrow, above the arms was a normal city crown, and the motto Ende Dispereert Niet. The motto was derived from the arms of the Coen family: Ende Dispereert Niet (And do not despair).

On 14 January 1929, the color of the shield was changed into orange. A major change to the coat of arms occurred on 22 January 1930, with the shape of the shield being changed, the supporting lions were actually supporting the shield, the crown was changed into a normal city crown and the motto shortened to Dispereert Niet (Do not despair).

The coat of arms was used until 7 March 1942, when the Japanese forces officially occupied Batavia.

=== Japanese occupation ===
During the Japanese occupation, there was no recorded use of any coat of arms.

=== Indonesian National Revolution ===
After the independence of Indonesia, Jakarta was officially designated as the capital of Indonesia. There was no recorded use of any coat of arms.

On 21 July 1947, during the Operation Product, the Dutch occupied Jakarta. The government of Jakarta was dissolved, and Suwiryo, the mayor of Jakarta, was arrested. Jakarta was renamed to Batavia and the old coat of arms was readopted.

Batavia was renamed again to Jakarta after the sovereignty recognition of Indonesia on 27 December 1949. The Batavian coat of arms was not used anymore.

=== First coat of arms (1951–1963) ===
The former coat of arms of Jakarta, used from 30 August 1951 to 26 June 1963.

After the sovereignty recognition of Indonesia, Jakarta became the capital of Indonesia again. Suwiryo was re-installed as the mayor of Jakarta, and on 10 September 1950, Suwiryo announced a contest for the coat of arms of Jakarta. A commission was formed for the contest, consisted of Professor Poerbatjaraka, Emiria Sunassa, Agus Djaya, G. A. Soekirno and J. E. Lefeber. A total of 111 works were submitted by various artists from all over Indonesia.

The commission decided to use the work of the artist Djajamarta, with several changes, as the coat of arms of Jakarta. On 30 August 1951, with the Decree of the Minister of Internal Affairs No. 45/1/6, the coat of arms was officially adopted.

=== Second coat of arms (1963–now) ===
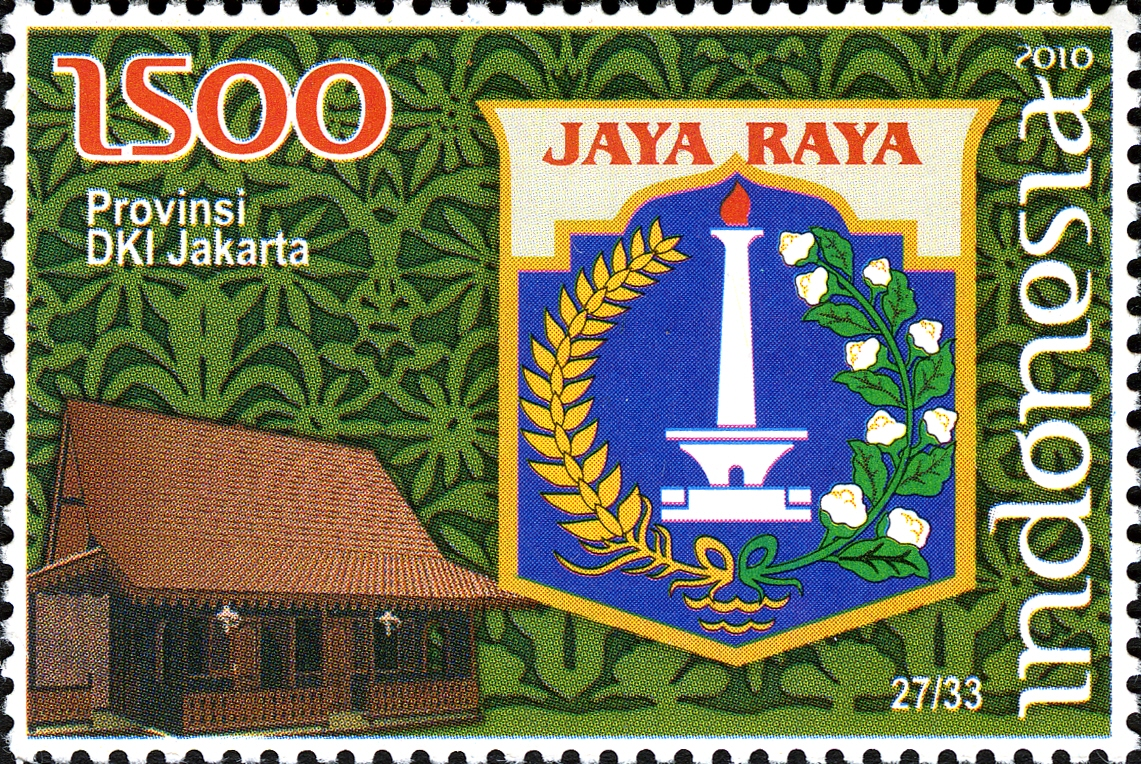
A 2010 stamp with the coat of arms of the Special Region of the Capital City of Jakarta

After the construction of the obelisk of the National Monument was finished in 1963, Sukarno instructed the Governor of Jakarta, Soemarno Sosroatmodjo, to include the monument in the coat of arms of Jakarta. A new emblem was commissioned, and the emblem was officially adopted on 26 June 1963. Indonesia's National Monument, being the landmark of Jakarta, is depicted on this emblem. The National Monument is also a symbol of splendour, fighting power, and creativity. The gate symbolises the city, and Jakarta's speciality as an entry and exit point for national activities and international relations. Then cotton and rice symbolise the prosperity or efforts of Jakarta which is determined to meet the clothing and food needs of its citizens. The golden rope symbolises unification and unity. The wave depicts Jakarta's location on the coast and also Jakarta as a port city. The pentagon shield symbolises Pancasila. As well as the regional motto Jaya raya which is the slogan of Jakarta's struggle.

The symbolism of the colours is as follows:

- The gold colour on the edge of the shield, is a symbol of glory.
- The red colour on the verse, is a symbol of heroism.
- The white colour on the gate, is a symbol of purity.
- The white colour on the National Monument, is the symbol of the splendour of noble creations.
- The yellow colour of rice, and the green and white colour of cotton, are symbols of prosperity and justice.
- The colour blue, is the symbol of free and vast space.
- The white colour in the waves, is the symbol of the loving nature of the sea.

The motto, which was written in the old spelling (Djaja Raja), was officially replaced with the new spelling (Jaya Raya) on 15 July 1964.

26 June 1963 – 15 July 1964

15 July 1964 – present

== Use in football ==
Besides being used as the official government emblem, it is also used as part of the Persija Jakarta football club logo. Jakarta association football club Persija adopted the emblem of Jakarta as a club insignia. Governor Soediro granted the permission for using the coat of arms. Initially the 1951 coat of arms, but it was revised as Jakarta had used the 1963/64 emblem.

== See also ==
- Armorial of Indonesia

== Bibliography ==
- Djawatan Penerangan Kotapradja Djakarta-Raja (1953), Republik Indonesia: Kotapradja Djakarta-Raja [Republic of Indonesia: Jakarta Municipality] (in Indonesian), Jakarta: Ministry of Information
