= Budiharjo Sukmadi =

Indonesian bureaucrat (1943–2015)

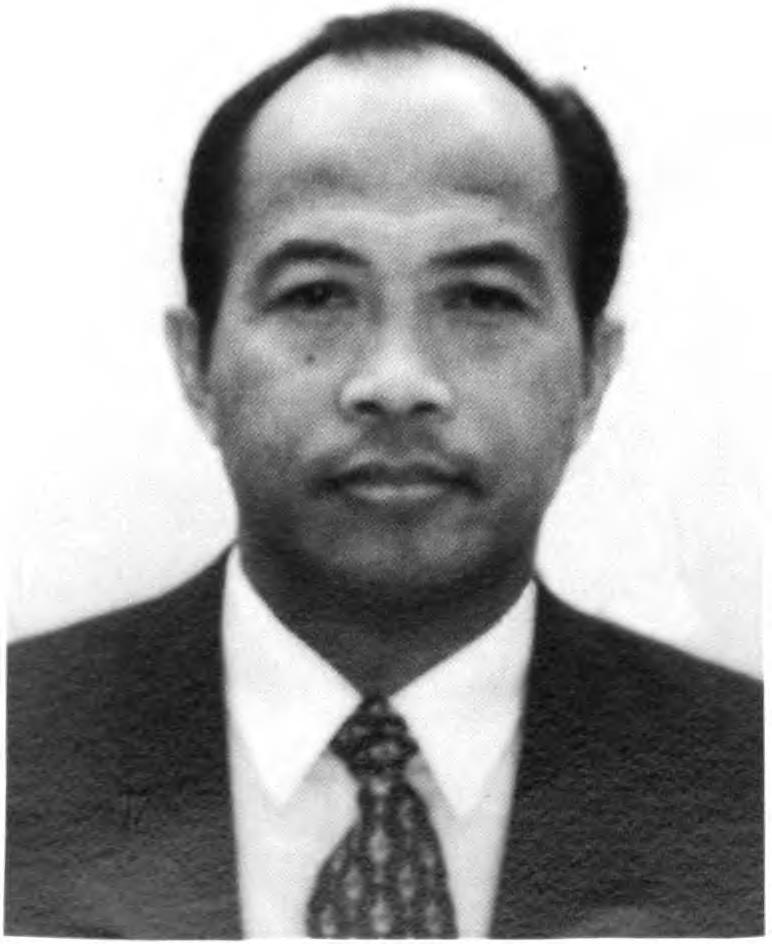

Vice Governor of Jakarta (Development Affairs)
- In office 12 May 1998 – 7 October 2002
- Governor: Sutiyoso
- Preceded by: Muhammad Rais
- Succeeded by: Fauzi Bowo

Vice Governor of Jakarta (Economic Affairs)
- Acting
- In office 24 August 1998 – 24 May 1999
- Governor: Sutiyoso
- Preceded by: Harun Al Rasyid
- Succeeded by: Fauzi Alvie Yasin

Chief of the Regional Development Planning Agency
- In office 27 September 1995 – 15 October 1998
- Governor: Sutiyoso
- Preceded by: Ery Chayaridipura
- Succeeded by: Bambang Sungkono

Personal details
- Born: May 22, 1943 Cilacap, Dutch East Indies
- Died: January 2, 2015 (aged 71)
- Education: Gadjah Mada University; University of Indonesia

Budiharjo Sukmadi (22 May 1943 – 2 January 2015) was an Indonesian civil engineer, urban planner, and bureaucrat who served as Jakarta's chief of development planning agency from 1995 to 1998 and as vice governor from 1998 to 2002.

== Early life and education ==
Budiharjo Sukmadi was born into a modest family in Cilacap, Central Java. He completed his primary education at the 3rd People's School (equivalent to elementary school) in Tegal in 1955, followed by secondary education at the Tegal State Junior High School in 1958 and the Bruder's High School in Purwokerto in 1961. Upon graduating high school, he entered the Faculty of Engineering at the Gadjah Mada University, majoring in civil engineering. His university years were marked by significant challenges, including strict professors and the socio-political turmoil of the 30 September Movement, which made student life particularly arduous. Sukmadi recalled the scarcity of basic necessities, such as rice, and the need to subsist on corn rice.

After graduating from UGM in 1967, Sukmadi pursued further studies, earning a master's degree in environmental science from the University of Indonesia. He also undertook specialized training in city planning and public administration at the University of Birmingham, United Kingdom, and in transportation management in the United States, sponsored by the World Bank.

== Career ==
Upon completing his undergraduate studies, Sukmadi served as Head of the Technical Section at the Perhutani State Company in Sampit, Central Kalimantan, from 1967 to 1970. There, he was responsible for designing employee housing, warehouses, workshops, and railway lines for timber transport. Notably, Sukmadi introduced the use of brick as a building material in a region where wooden houses predominated. By utilizing local clay to produce bricks, he not only conserved timber resources but also set a new standard for housing construction in Sampit, with approximately twenty brick houses serving as prototypes for the community. Following his tenure in Kalimantan, Sukmadi worked as a building contractor in Jakarta and Merak, undertaking projects such as constructing buildings for Pertamina. However, his principled approach to business, particularly his refusal to engage in corrupt practices, led to financial losses.

Soekmadi entered the Jakarta provincial government in the 1971. Initially assigned to the Regional Development Planning Agency, he faced the challenge of adapting his technical background to the broader demands of economic and political planning. He eventually became the chief of transportation in the agency, serving from 1974 to 1980. Recognizing the need for further expertise, he seized opportunities for advanced study in city planning and transportation management, both of which were nascent fields in Indonesia at the time. As Head of the Physical and Infrastructure Division at Bappeda from 1980 to 1986, Sukmadi played a pivotal role in shaping Jakarta's urban form. One of his most significant achievements was leading the preparation of the Jakarta Spatial Plan for 2005, a comprehensive blueprint for the city's physical development.

In 1986, Sukmadi was appointed Head of the Jakarta Land Transportation and Traffic Agency. Drawing on his expertise in city planning and transportation management, he implemented a series of reforms aimed at modernizing the agency and improving its public image. He restructured the organization to eliminate its reputation for being more punitive than the police and introduced computerization in route planning and vehicle inspections. These innovations reduced reliance on individual bureaucrats and increased efficiency, though they also met with resistance from staff unaccustomed to the new systems. Nevertheless, Sukmadi persisted, convinced of the long-term benefits of these reforms. After his tenure at the Land Transportation and Traffic Agency, Sukmadi returned to the planning agency, serving as deputy chief from 1989 to 1996 and as chief from 27 September 1995 to 15 October 1998. During this period, he oversaw major projects such as the North Jakarta coastal reclamation and the planning of the Fatmawati-Kota subway line. His work in these roles was complemented by his postgraduate studies in environmental science.

On 12 May 1998, Sukmadi was appointed as vice governor of Jakarta for development affairs. He emphasized the importance of balancing the interests of diverse social actors, including the increasing influence of conglomerates in shaping urban development. Sukmadi observed that the rapid economic growth and the rise of conglomerates had transformed previously overlooked areas, such as Kapuk in North Jakarta, into elite districts. However, he also noted the misalignment between private interests and city planning, highlighting the need for government to better anticipate and manage urban change.

== Personal life ==
Budiharjo Sukmadi was married to Nur Hutami and has one son and one daughter.
