= Henk Ngantung =

Indonesian politician and painter (1921–1991)

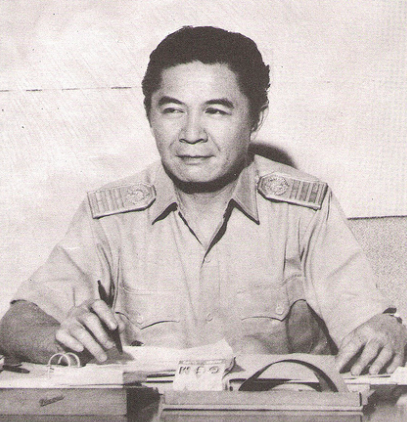
- Official portrait as Deputy Governor of Jakarta c. 1964

2nd Governor of Jakarta
- In office 27 August 1964 – 15 July 1965
- Deputy: Satoto Hoepoedio; Soewondo
- Preceded by: Soemarno Sosroatmodjo
- Succeeded by: Soemarno Sosroatmodjo

1st Vice Governor of Jakarta
- In office 29 January 1960 – 26 August 1964
- Governor: Soemarno Sosroatmodjo
- Preceded by: Office established
- Succeeded by: Satoto Hoepoedio; Soewondo

Personal details
- Born: 1 March 1927 Manado, Dutch East Indies
- Died: 12 December 1991 (aged 64) Jakarta, Indonesia
- Resting place: Menteng Pulo War Cemetery
- Spouse: Hetty Evelyn Mamesah (m. 1964)
- Children: 4
- Occupation: Politician; painter

Hendrik Hermanus Joel "Henk" Ngantung (1 March 1927 – 12 December 1991) was an Indonesian painter and politician of Minahasan descent. He was appointed Vice Governor of Jakarta by President Sukarno and briefly was Governor of Jakarta between 1964 and 1965. He was the first Catholic to hold the latter post.

== Biography ==
Ngantung was born in the Minahasa heartland of North Sulawesi province, in the capital city of Manado to a poor family. Henk was an autodidact painter without any formal education. Together with Chairil Anwar and Asrul Sani, he co-founded the Indonesian artistic movement Gelanggang (meaning the arena). He was also member of the China-Indonesia Friendship from 1955 to 1958.

Ngantung was married to Hetty Evelyn "Evie" Mamesah and they had four children, Maya Ngantung, Genie Ngantung, Kamang Ngantung and Karno Ngantung.

He became Vice Governor of Jakarta during the reign of governor Soemarno Sosroatmodjo. President Sukarno entrusted him to turn Jakarta into a city of culture based on his work as an artist. After holding the post of deputy governor from 1960 to 1964, he succeeded Sosroatmodjo as Governor of Jakarta from 1964–1965 before Sosroatmodjo retook the position in 1965. Ngantung's appointment was vehemently opposed due to his left-wing ideology, with some opponents accusing him of being a communist.

From 1965 onwards, Ngantung consecrated his life to the arts. He lived in poverty, suffered bad health and developed heart disease and glaucoma. He lost eyesight completely in his right eye, and had just 30% vision in the left eye, but continued painting with great difficulty. In 1990, the Indonesian businessman and philanthropist Ciputra sponsored Ngantung's only official exhibition just a month before his death on 12 December 1991. His portrait of Brigadier John Mellsop (1907–1980), painted in Java in 1946, is in the collection of the National Army Museum, London.
