= Tjokropranolo =

Indonesian politician and military officer (1924 – 1998)

Lieutenant general (Ret.) Tjokropranolo
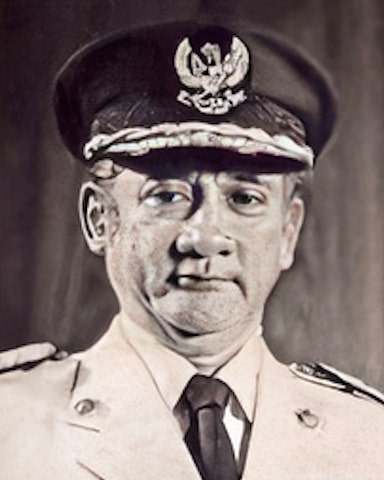

5th Governor of Jakarta
- In office 29 September 1977 – 29 September 1982; Acting: 11 July – 29 September 1977
- Preceded by: Ali Sadikin
- Succeeded by: Soeprapto

Personal details
- Born: 21 May 1924 Temanggung, Dutch East Indies
- Died: 22 July 1998 (aged 74) Jakarta, Indonesia
- Party: Golkar
- Education: Europeesche Lagere School
- Occupation: Politician

Military service
- Allegiance: Empire of Japan (1942–1945); Indonesia (1945 onwards)
- Branch/service: Homeland Defenders (1942 – 1945); Indonesian Army (1945 onwards)
- Years of service: 1942–1977
- Rank: Lieutenant General

Tjokropranolo (21 May 1924 – 22 July 1998) was an Indonesian politician and former military officer who was the 8th Governor of Jakarta, serving between 1977 and 1982. During the Indonesian National Revolution, he was the assistant to Sudirman, and later wrote a biography of the commander.

== Early life ==
Tjokoropranolo was born in Temanggung, today part of Central Java, on 21 May 1924. His father was the regent of Temanggung at the time. He studied at the Europeesche Lagere School.

== Career ==
=== Revolution ===
During the Japanese occupation of the Dutch East Indies, Tjokropranolo joined PETA.

In the leadup to the 1948 Madiun Affair, Tjokropranolo - then armed forces commander Sudirman's adjutant - noted that he managed to restrain Indonesian Navy and Senopati Brigade soldiers from continuing a firefight with Siliwangi Division troops when tensions flared between the groups. Sudirman sent Tjokropranolo as an envoy to other military officers such as Slamet Riyadi to convince them to remain loyal to the republican cause. In one occasion, Tjokropranolo was sent to Senopati Division commander Soediarto whom he failed to convince, resulting in him being arrested though he managed to escape. Soediarto was later removed from his post.

=== Post-war ===
After the recognition of Indonesian sovereignty in 1949, Tjokropranolo took part in the defeat of several rebellions including the Legion of the Just Ruler, the Makassar Uprising and rebellion of the Republic of South Maluku, in addition to the Indonesia-Malaysia confrontation and the 30 September movement.

Between 1970 and 1974, as a major general, Tjokropranolo served as the personal assistant on security to President Suharto, in addition to being his secretary for military affairs and security coordinator. Tjokropranolo was also appointed as the president of the Indonesian Pencak Silat Association (Ikatan Pencak Silat Indonesia, IPSI) on 1973, and for a second four-year term in 1977. He also served as Jakarta governor Ali Sadikin's assistant for some time.

He retired as a lieutenant general.

=== Governor ===
In 1977, Tjokropranolo was elected as the Governor of Jakarta to replace Ali Sadikin by the Jakarta Regional People's Representative Council, winning 32 out of 40 votes. He was sworn in as the acting Governor of Jakarta on 11 July 1977. Soon after he was sworn into office, the metropolitan rail system for Jabodetabek was reopened. He was later made the definitive governor on 29 September.

=== Later years ===
After the end of his term, he became a commissioner at Bank Tani Nasional. In 1992, he published a biography of Soedirman, which included his personal experiences with the general. He died in Jakarta on 22 July 1998.
