= Wiyogo Atmodarminto =

Indonesian general and diplomat

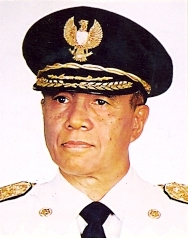

7th Governor of Jakarta
- In office 1987–1992
- Preceded by: R. Soeprapto
- Succeeded by: Soerjadi Soedirdja

Personal details
- Born: 22 November 1922 Yogyakarta, Dutch East Indies
- Died: 19 October 2012 (aged 89) Jakarta, Indonesia

Military service
- Allegiance: Indonesia
- Branch/service: Indonesian Army
- Rank: Lieutenant General

Wiyogo Atmodarminto (22 November 1922 – 19 October 2012) or better known as Bang Wi, is an Indonesian military figure, diplomat and politician. He served as Governor of Jakarta, the country's capital, from 1987–1992. Previously, he served as the Indonesian Ambassador to Japan and occupied several important army posts. Wiyogo participated in the General Offensive of 1 March 1949.

== Early life and education ==
Wiyogo Atmodarminto was born in Yogyakarta, Dutch East Indies, on 22 November 1922, at the Yogyakarta Palace. He underwent formal education in the Taman Siswa environment, before continuing to the Yogya Military Academy. As a cadet, he was involved in the independence struggle, and continued his career in the army. In 1954, he continued his education at the Rangers Course at Fort Benning in the United States.

== Military service ==
In his capacity as Deputy Commander of Battalion 330 in Majalengka, he faced the Darul Islam rebellion. In 1965, he studied in Germany before becoming the Commander of Garuda IV in South Vietnam. In 1973 he was appointed Chief of Staff of the Army Strategic Command unit (Kostrad), then he was appointed as Governor of the Indonesian Military Academy, Commander of Kostrad and Commander of the Defense Area Command I & II.

== Governor of Jakarta ==
=== Tenure ===
==== BMW concept ====
During his leadership as the governor of Jakarta, he applied, what a journalist colleague called it, the BMW concept, which stands for Clean, Humane, Authoritative in Jakarta (Indonesian: Bersih, Manusiawi dan Berwibawa).

==== Becak ban ====
As governor, Wiyogo Atmodarminto continued a ban on becaks, which were Cycle rickshaws in Indonesia that were considered an icon of the capital city, a ban that was similar to that of the ban instituted by governor Ali Sadikin, who served from 1966 until 1977.

== Death ==
On 19 October 2012, Wiyogo Atmodarminto collapsed after performing the maghrib prayer at home and was rushed to the Metropolitan Medical Center hospital on Jl. Rasuna Said, South Jakarta. He died shortly thereafter. His remains were escorted by soldiers to the Kalibata Heroes' Cemetery in South Jakarta.

| Preceded by R. Soeprapto | Governor of Jakarta; 1987-1992 | Succeeded by Soerjadi Soedirdja |
