= Governor of Jakarta =

Head of government of Jakarta, Indonesia

Governor of the Special Capital Region of Jakarta
- Gubernur Daerah Khusus Ibukota Jakarta
- Coat of arms of Jakarta

- Flag of Jakarta

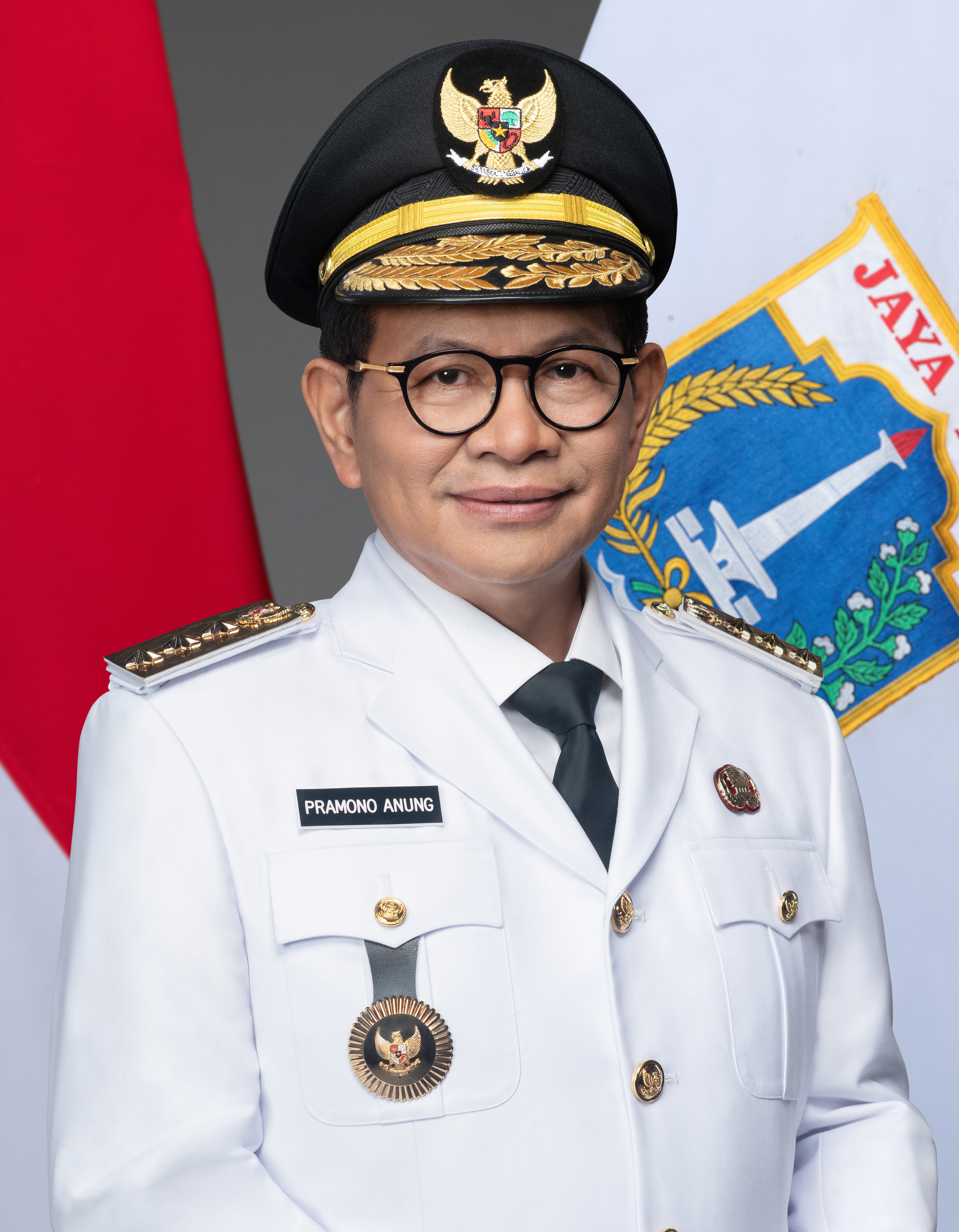
- Incumbent; Pramono Anung since 20 February 2025
- Special Capital Region of Jakarta Provincial Government
- Style: Mr. Governor (informal); The Honorable (formal); His Excellency (diplomatic)
- Type: Chief executive
- Status: Head of government
- Abbreviation: GOTSCROJ, GOJ (in English); Gub. DKI Jakarta (in Indonesian)
- Residence: Official Residence of the Governor of the Special Capital Region of Jakarta, Menteng, Central Jakarta
- Seat: Central Jakarta
- Nominator: Political parties and Independent
- Appointer: Direct popular elections within Jakarta (Note: since 2007, previously via Jakarta Regional House of Representatives) or President
- Term length: Five years, renewable once 1 years (specifically for the acting governor)
- Inaugural holder: Gerardus Johannes Bisschop
- Formation: August 1916; 110 years ago (as Burgemeester Batavia)
- Deputy: Vice Governor of Jakarta
- Salary: Rp3 million (US$179,47) per month
- Website: www.jakarta.go.id

The Governor of Jakarta (Indonesian: Gubernur Jakarta) is an elected politician who, along with the vice governor and 106 members of the Jakarta Regional House of Representatives, is accountable for the strategic government of the city of Jakarta. The city is administratively equal to a province with special status as the largest city of Indonesia. Instead of a mayor, the executive head of Jakarta is a governor.

== Background ==
The governing system of Jakarta has changed throughout its history. On March 5, 1942, Japan occupied Batavia from the Dutch control and the city was named Jakarta Special City (ジャカルタ特別市, Jakaruta tokubetsu-shi), in accordance with the special status that was assigned to the city. After the collapse of Japan, Indonesian nationalists who declared independence on August 17, 1945, the government of Jakarta City was changed from the Japanese into the Jakarta National Administration in September 1945. After the war, the Dutch name Batavia was internationally recognized until full Indonesian independence was achieved on December 27, 1949 and Jakarta was officially proclaimed the national capital of Indonesia. Based on the Act No. 5 of 1974 relating to the Fundamentals of Regional Government, Jakarta was confirmed as the capital of Indonesia and one of Indonesia's 26 provinces.

== Elections ==
This first government was held by a mayor until the end of 1960, when the office was changed to that of a governor. The last mayor of Jakarta was Sudiro, until he was replaced by Dr Sumarno as governor of the province. In August 2007, Jakarta held its first ever election to choose a governor, whereas previously the city's governors were elected by members of DPRD. The poll is part of a country-wide decentralisation drive, allowing for direct local elections in several areas. Elections for governor and deputy governor are held for a fixed five-year term.

=== Most recent election ===
The most recent election was held on 27 November 2024 to elect both the governor and vice governor of Jakarta for the 2025 to 2030 term. The election was held as part of local elections for governors, regents, and mayors across 36 other provinces in Indonesia.

== List of mayors and governors ==
Below is a list of Mayors and Governors who have held office in the regional government district of Batavia in the Dutch East Indies until its transformation to Jakarta in Indonesia from the formation of the office in 1916.

Note: Italic denotes acting mayor (governor it's already below)

=== Burgemeester Batavia (1916–1942) ===
The Dutch East Indies government began to appoint Mayors of Batavia (Dutch: Burgermeester Batavia) in 1916, previously the office was held by a Resident Assistant from 1905. There are total of five Burgermeester served before the Japanese invasion in 1942.

No	Image	Name	Took office	Left office	Note
1		Gerardus Johannes Bisschop	August 1916	June 1920	(Note: As Batavia Burgemeester (Mayor of Batavia))
—		Hendrik van Breen	June 1920	7 August 1920	
2		A. Meijroos	7 August 1920	20 April 1933	
3		E. A. Voorneman	20 April 1933	1941	
—		Archibald Theodoor Bogaardt	1941	1941	
4		E. A. Voorneman	1941	1942	

=== Mayor of the Special City of Jakarta (1942–1945) ===
After the Japanese occupied Jakarta on 8 March, the Japanese upgraded the status of Jakarta into a tokubetsu-shi (特別市; Special City) on 8 August 1942, and appointed a tokubetsu-shichō (特別市長; head of the tokubetsu-shi). Prior to the appointment of tokubetsu-shichō, the Japanese appointed Baginda Dahlan Abdullah as the acting tokubetsu-shichō.

No	Image	Name	Took office	Left office	Time in office	Deputy
—		Baginda Dahlan Abdullah	8 August 1942	25 August 1942	17 days	none
1		Sakae Tsukamoto	25 August 1942	21 June 1943	300 days	Suwiryo Baginda Dahlan Abdullah
2		Yosie K.	21 June 1943	?	?	Suwiryo Baginda Dahlan Abdullah
3		Shigeo Hasegawa	?	23 September 1945	?	Suwiryo Baginda Dahlan Abdullah

=== Republican Mayor of Jakarta (1945–1947) ===
After the Indonesian Independence was proclaimed on 17 August 1945, the power transfer of the city was handed over from Japan to Indonesia on 19 September 1945. Following the power transfer, President of Indonesia appointed Suwirjo as the Mayor of Jakarta on 23 September 1945. Suwirjo ended him term after being arrested by the Dutch forces on 21 July 1947, following the Operation Product that occupied the town.

No	Image	Name	Took office	Left office	Time in office
1		Suwiryo	23 September 1945	21 July 1947	1 year, 301 days

=== Dutch Mayors of Jakarta/Batavia (1946–1950) ===
Following the Dutch return to Jakarta in early 1946, the Dutch civil administration, NICA, appointed the Archibald Bogaardt as the acting mayor of Batavia. Bogaardt had been the mayor of Batavia previously in 1941, and lost his power to the Japanese in 1942. The Dutch appointed Bogaardt in a shadow government and referred the de facto major, Suwiryo, as republikeinse burgemeester. Bogaardt's successor, E. M. Stok, finally gained de facto control after the Dutch occupied the city in Operation Product on 21 July 1947.

There were four mayors of the city during this period, but only one was recognized as a definitive mayor, while the rest was referred as waarnemend burgemeester (acting mayor).

No	Image	Name	Took office	Left office	Time in office
—		Archibald Theodoor Bogaardt	30 November 1946	28 June 1947	239 days
—		Elbert Marinus Stok	28 June 1947	26 August 1948	1 year, 59 days
1		Robert Thomas Praaning	26 August 1948	20 April 1949	237 days
—		Sastromoeljono	20 April 1949	30 March 1950	344 days

=== Governor of the Federal Region of Batavia (1948–1950) ===
The formation of the Federal Region of Batavia was announced with the Staatsblad No. 63 in June 1948. The federal region was given an autonomous status in the territory of the State of Pasundan. The governor of the region, Hilman Djajadiningrat, was appointed on 2 November 1948.

No	Image	Name	Took office	Left office	Time in office
1		Hilman Djajadiningrat	2 November 1948	30 March 1950	1 year, 148 days

=== Since 1950 ===
After the return of Jakarta to Indonesia, the Federal Territory of Batavia was abolished. Hilman Djajadiningrat, the former governor, and Sastromoeljono, the former mayor, handed over their mandate to Suwiryo on 30 March 1950. By 1960, the position of mayor was upgraded to governor, in line with the strengthening of Jakarta's role and status as the national capital.

No.	Portrait	Name	Took office	Left office	Time in office	Vice Governor(s)	Election
Mayor of Jakarta
1		Suwiryo	30 March 1950	2 May 1951	1 year, 33 days		
—		Soewahjo Soemodilogo	2 May 1951	29 June 1951	58 days		
2		Sjamsuridjal	29 June 1951	8 December 1953	2 years, 162 days		
3		Sudiro	8 December 1953 (Note: Since 25 February 1958 as Regional Head (see Law No. 1 of 1957))	29 January 1960	6 years, 52 days		
Governor of Jakarta
1		Soemarno Sosroatmodjo	29 January 1960	26 August 1964	4 years, 210 days	Henk Ngantung	1960
2		Henk Ngantung	26 August 1964	15 July 1965	323 days		—
3 (1)		Soemarno Sosroatmodjo (Note: In this second period, he also served as the Home Affairs Minister of Indonesia.)	15 July 1965	18 March 1966	246 days		—
4		Ali Sadikin	28 April 1966	11 July 1977	11 years, 74 days	RHA Wiriadinata	—
5		Tjokropranolo	29 September 1977	29 September 1982	5 years, 0 days		1977
6		Soeprapto	29 September 1982	6 October 1987	5 years, 7 days	(1) Eddie Marzuki Nalapraya (2) Bunyamin Ramto|	1982
7		Wiyogo Atmodarminto	6 October 1987	6 October 1992	5 years, 0 days	(1) Basofi Sudirman (2) Herbowo|	1987
8		Soerjadi Soedirdja	6 October 1992	6 October 1997	5 years, 0 days	(1) M. Idroes (2) Tubagus Muhammad Rais (3) RS Museno	1992
9		Sutiyoso	6 October 1997	7 October 2007	10 years, 1 day	(1997–2002) (1) Abdul Kahfi (2) Boedihardjo Soekmadi (3) Djailani (4) Fauzi Alvi	1997; 2002
9		Sutiyoso	6 October 1997	7 October 2007	10 years, 1 day	(2002–2007); Fauzi Bowo	1997; 2002
10		Fauzi Bowo	7 October 2007	7 October 2012	5 years, 0 days	Prijanto	2007
11		Joko Widodo	15 October 2012	16 October 2014 (Note: Resigned after being elected as the President of Indonesia.)	2 years, 1 day	Basuki Tjahaja Purnama	2012
12		Basuki Tjahaja Purnama	19 November 2014	9 May 2017 (Note: Dismissed after being sentenced to two years in prison for religious blasphemy.)	2 years, 171 days	Djarot Saiful Hidayat	—
13		Djarot Saiful Hidayat	15 June 2017	15 October 2017	122 days	None	—
14		Anies Baswedan	16 October 2017	16 October 2022	5 years, 0 days	(2017–2018); Sandiaga Uno	2017
14		Anies Baswedan	16 October 2017	16 October 2022	5 years, 0 days	(2020–2022); Ahmad Riza Patria	2017
15		Pramono Anung	20 February 2025	Incumbent	1 year, 199 days	Rano Karno	2024

Legends

Masyumi
PNI
Independent
Democratic
Military
PDI-P

=== Acting governor ===
In a stack of governments, a regional head who submits for leave, temporarily resigns, and left office from his position to the central government, then the Minister of Home Affairs prepares his successor who is a bureaucrat in the local government or even a Vice Governor, including when the position of governor is in transition. The following is a list of temporary replacements for the post of Governor of Jakarta.

No.	Portrait	Name	Took office	Left office	Time in office	Governor(s)	Nickname
1		Basuki Rahmat (Note: Following Sumarno's arrest on 18 March 1966, Minister for Veteran and Demobilization Affairs Basuki Rahmat was appointed as the Minister of Home Affairs and acting Governor of Jakarta.)	18 March 1966	28 April 1966	41 days	Soemarno Sosroatmodjo	
2		Tjokropranolo	11 July 1977	29 September 1977	80 days	Transition	Bang Nolly
4		Prijanto	24 June 2012		4 days	Fauzi Bowo	
4		Prijanto	30 June 2012		4 days	Fauzi Bowo	
4		Prijanto	3 July 2012		4 days	Fauzi Bowo	
4		Prijanto	6 July 2012		4 days	Fauzi Bowo	
4		Prijanto	14 September 2012	16 September 2012	2 days	Fauzi Bowo	
5		Fadjar Panjaitan	8 October 2012	15 October 2012	7 days	Transition	
6		Basuki Tjahaja Purnama (Note: Previously Joko Widodo resigned as Governor of Jakarta because he was elected as President of Indonesia.)	31 May 2014	22 July 2014	52 days	Joko Widodo	Ahok
6		Basuki Tjahaja Purnama	16 October 2014	19 November 2014	34 days	Joko Widodo	Ahok
7		Soni Sumarsono	28 October 2016	11 February 2017	107 days	Basuki Tjahaja Purnama	Soni
7		Soni Sumarsono	7 March 2017	15 April 2017	40 days	Basuki Tjahaja Purnama	Soni
8		Djarot Saiful Hidayat	9 May 2017	15 June 2017	37 days	Basuki Tjahaja Purnama	Jarot
9		Saefullah (Note: Saefullah served as Acting Governor of Jakarta for 40 hours before the governor and deputy governor-elect were sworn in. He replaces Djarot Saiful Hidayat who has completed his term of office.)	15 October 2017	16 October 2017	1 day	Transition	Bang Ipul
10		Heru Budi Hartono (Note: After Anies has completed term of office on 16 October 2022, Heru Budi appointed as the acting Governor of Jakarta until 2024 Jakarta gubernatorial election.)	17 October 2022	18 October 2024	2 years, 1 day	Transition	Heru
11		Teguh Setyabudi (Note: Teguh Setyabudi appointed by Joko Widodo to serve as acting Governor of Jakarta replacing Heru Budi Hartono. This appointment was made to fill the vacant position until the election of the Governor in February 2025.)	18 October 2024	20 February 2025	125 days	Transition	

Legends

Independent
Democratic
Gerindra
Military
PDI-P

== See also ==
- Timeline of Jakarta
- Vice Governor of Jakarta
