= Soerjadi Soedirdja =

Governor of Jakarta from 1992 to 1997

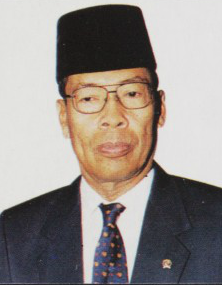
- Soerjadi in 1999

7th Coordinating Minister for Political, Social, and Security Affairs
- In office 15 February 2000 – 23 August 2000
- President: Abdurrahman Wahid
- Preceded by: Wiranto
- Succeeded by: Susilo Bambang Yudhoyono

23rd Minister of Home Affairs and Regional Autonomy
- In office 29 October 1999 – 23 July 2001
- President: Abdurrahman Wahid
- Preceded by: Syarwan Hamid; Feisal Tanjung (acting)
- Succeeded by: Hari Sabarno

8th Governor of Jakarta
- In office 6 October 1992 – 6 October 1997
- Preceded by: Wiyogo Atmodarminto
- Succeeded by: Sutiyoso

Personal details
- Born: 11 October 1938 Batavia, Dutch East Indies
- Died: 3 August 2021 (aged 82) Jakarta, Indonesia
- Spouse: Sri Soemarsih
- Education: Indonesian Military Academy; Indonesian Army Command and General Staff College
- Occupation: Army officer; politician
- Nickname: Bang Sur

Military service
- Allegiance: Indonesia
- Branch/service: Indonesian Army
- Years of service: 1962–1993
- Rank: General (honorary)
- Unit: Infantry
- Commands: Kodam Jayakarta
- Service no.: 19685

Soerjadi Soedirdja (11 October 1938 – 3 August 2021) was an Indonesian politician and military general.

He was Governor of Jakarta from 1992 to 1997 and also Minister of Home Affairs from 1999 to 2001.

== Career ==
=== Governor of Jakarta ===
During his leadership, he made projects to build flats, create green areas, and also increase water catchment areas. The subway and triple decker projects that had been touted at the time have not materialized. He succeeded in freeing the streets of Jakarta from pedicab transportation, a program that had been started since the previous governor (Bang Wi). In addition, the 27 July 1996 incident occurred during the Jakarta period under his leadership.

In addition, Soerjadi also implemented a One Way System (SSA) on a number of roads. To support the rate of mobility of Jakarta's population, the central government and regional governments as well as the private sector have built a number of toll roads, namely the Inner City Toll Road, the Outer Ring Road Toll Road, the Airport Toll Road, as well as the Jakarta-Cikampek, Jakarta-Bogor-Ciawi and Jakarta-Merak toll roads, which connecting Jakarta with the surrounding cities.

Soerjadi also implemented an increase in the discipline and quality of apparatus resources in the Five Guidelines for DKI Jakarta Government Officials. From this program, the Provincial Government of Jakarta received the 'Samya Krida Tata Tenteram Karta Raharja' Award. The award is an appreciation for the highest work results in implementing the 5 Year Development.
