= Fauzi Bowo =

Indonesian politician and diplomat

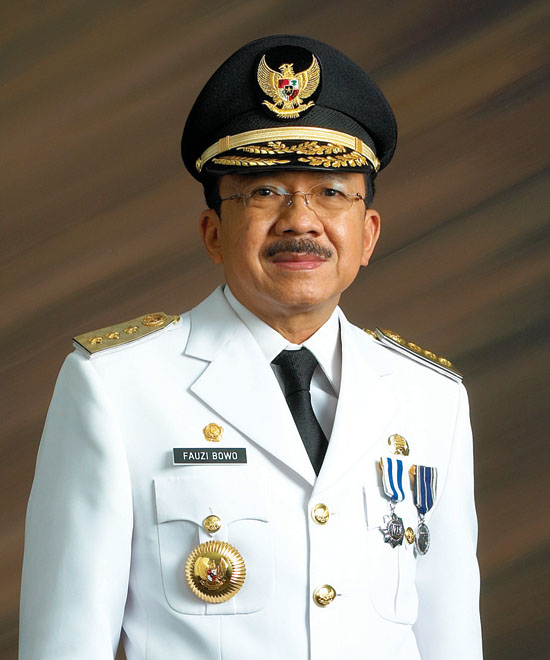
- Official portrait, c. 2007

7th Ambassador of Indonesia to Germany
- In office 24 December 2013 – 20 February 2018
- Preceded by: Eddy Pratomo
- Succeeded by: Arif Havas Oegroseno

10th Governor of Jakarta
- In office 7 October 2007 – 7 October 2012
- Vice Governor: Prijanto
- Preceded by: Sutiyoso
- Succeeded by: Fadjar Panjaitan (acting); Joko Widodo

10th Vice Governor of Jakarta
- In office 7 October 2002 – 7 October 2007
- Governor: Sutiyoso
- Preceded by: Abdul Kahfi; Budiharjo Sukmadi; Djailani; Fauzi Alvi
- Succeeded by: Prijanto

Personal details
- Born: Fauzi Bowo bin Djohari Adiputro; 10 April 1949 (age 77) Jakarta, Indonesia
- Party: Demokrat
- Spouse: Sri Hartati (m. 1974)
- Education: University of Indonesia; TU Branschweig; University of Kaiserslautern
- Occupation: Politician; diplomat
- Nickname: Foke

Fauzi Bowo (born 10 April 1949) is an Indonesian politician and diplomat who was the Indonesian Ambassador to Germany from 2013 to 2018. He was the governor of Jakarta between 2007 and 2012 and previously served as deputy governor from 2002 to 2007 under Sutiyoso's governorship.

He has worked for the Jakarta municipal administration since 1977 and was once a treasurer of the Golkar political party from 1992 to 1997. On 9 August 2007, he was elected governor of Jakarta for the 2007–2012 term, defeating his only rival Adang Daradjatun 57.9% to 42.1% in the first ever election for the post. He was inaugurated on 7 October 2007. Seeking a second term as governor in the 2012 gubernatorial election, he was defeated by Joko Widodo on 20 September 2012 after a second-round runoff.

== Early life ==
Fauzi Bowo, known as "Foke" to many Jakartans, was born in Jakarta to a wealthy landowning family. His father, Djohari bin Adiputro, was a Javanese from Malang, East Java while his mother, Nuraini binti Abdul Manaf, was an ethnic Betawi from Jakarta. After completing his high school education at the Canisius College in Jakarta, Fauzi studied at the architecture faculty at the University of Indonesia from 1967 to 1969. There, he was involved in the Indonesian Students Action Front (KAMI), an organization established to counter the communist-influenced Indonesian Student Union. In 1969, he won a scholarship to study in West Germany, where he was a student of town planning at TU Braunschweig, graduating in 1977. While in Germany he was active in the Indonesian Students Association. In 2000, he completed a doctoral degree Doktor Ingenieur from University of Kaiserslautern, Germany.

== Career ==
Two years after graduating in 1979, Fauzi was appointed acting head of the Jakarta Regional Bureau, eventually being promoted as regional secretary in 1999. He served as treasurer to the government Golkar organization from 1982 to 1997. In 2002, he expressed his intention to stand for the governor of Jakarta, which at the time was chosen by the regional administration. However, he was persuaded to stand aside and become deputy governor to Sutiyoso.

In 2004 he began approaching political and religious organizations to support his bid for the governorship of Jakarta. With the support of 19 political parties, including Golkar, PDI-P and PPP, he stood for the governorship in 2007 with Prijanto as his running mate. Fauzi defeated his opponent Adang Daradjatun (running with Dani Anwar as candidate for deputy governor) in Jakarta's first gubernatorial election on 8 August by 57.9% to 42.1% of the vote.

Fauzi was shortlisted for the 2008 World Mayor award but failed to finish in the top 10.

In 2013, he was appointed as Indonesia's ambassador to Germany.

== Politics ==
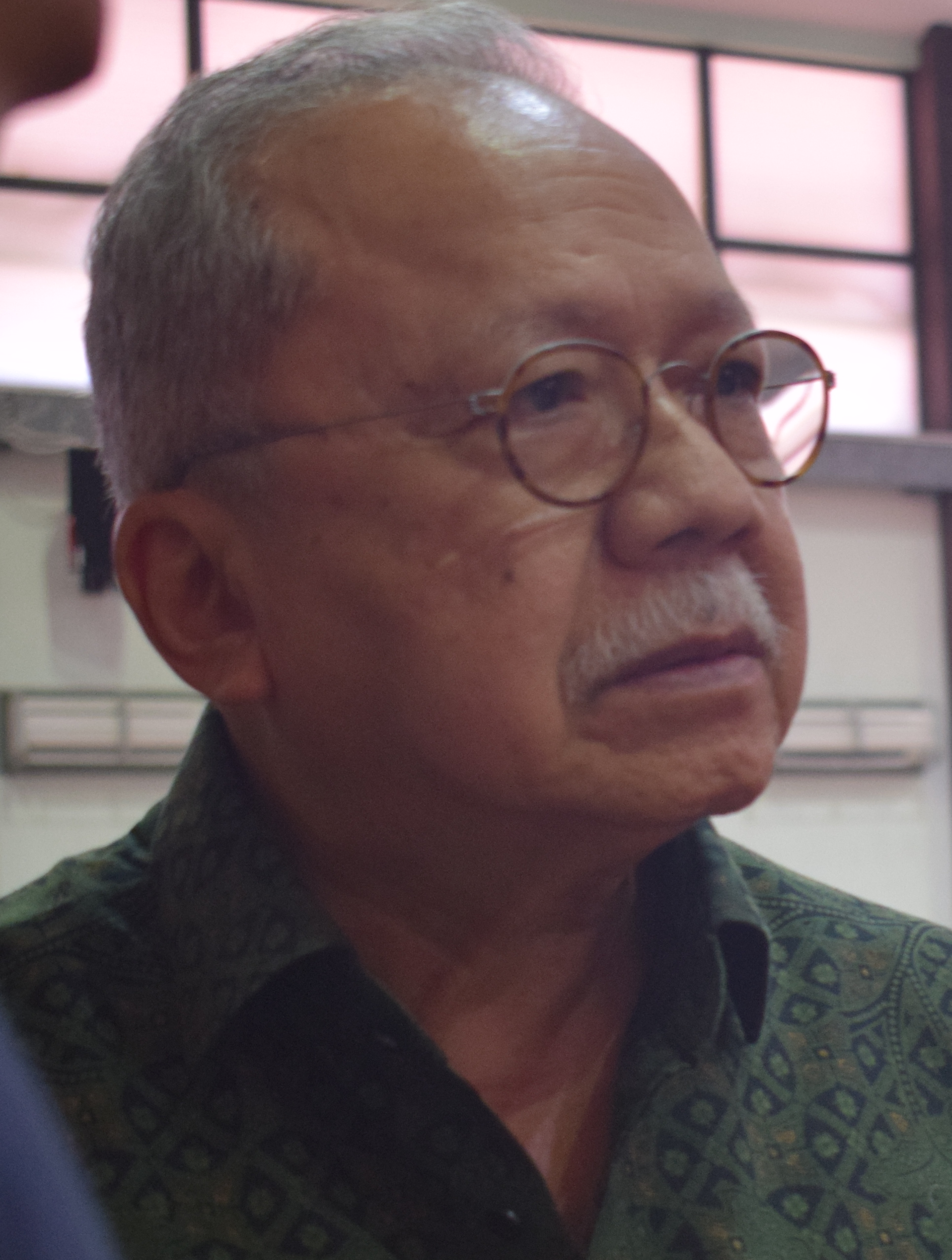
Fauzi Bowo in 2024

Under Fauzi Bowo, 5 new routes of TransJakarta (Jakarta's "busway") were added, however TransJakarta users have complained of long waiting time and worsening service. There are constant complaints in the media about the worsening traffic situation. Many Jakartans argue that Governor Fauzi and the Jakarta regional government should have done more to invest in public transport facilities, and to enforce regulations, in order to improve traffic flows across Jakarta. One response to the problem was a plan (2011) to establish a Greater Jakarta Transportation Authority to coordinate the implementation of the numerous proposals that had been made to improve the traffic challenges. In 2012, a feasibility study for a Mass Rapid Transit (MRT) system was published; it proposed integration of the TransJakarta service and a railway service, and predicted construction of the rail lines to begin at end of 2012. After the project was pushed by Fauzi's successor, Joko Widodo, construction was in fact commenced in October 2013.

One of the policies which Fauzi pursued is support for an anti-smoking campaign first introduced by his predecessor, former Governor Sutiyoso. The first tobacco legislation in Jakarta was introduced by Sutiyoso in 2005 when a by-law on air pollution control was issued. Several supporting regulations were subsequently introduced. Anti-smoking regulations introduced by Fauzi in 2011 banned people from smoking inside public buildings and certain other places. The regulations have had a noticeable impact in Jakarta. There has been a marked reduction in smoking in government offices and in places such as large modern hotels which are subject to the regulations. In May 2011 the World Health Organization named Fauzi as one of the recipients of the World No Tobacco Day 2011 Awards.

== Honours ==
- Satyalancana Wira Karya
- Satyalancana Pendidikan
- Satyalancana Karya Satya
- Lencana Melati Pramuka

Political offices
Preceded by Sutiyoso	Governor of Jakarta; 2007–2012	Succeeded by Fadjar Panjaitan (acting); Joko Widodo
