= Soemarno Sosroatmodjo =

Indonesian soldier, doctor and politician (1911–1991)

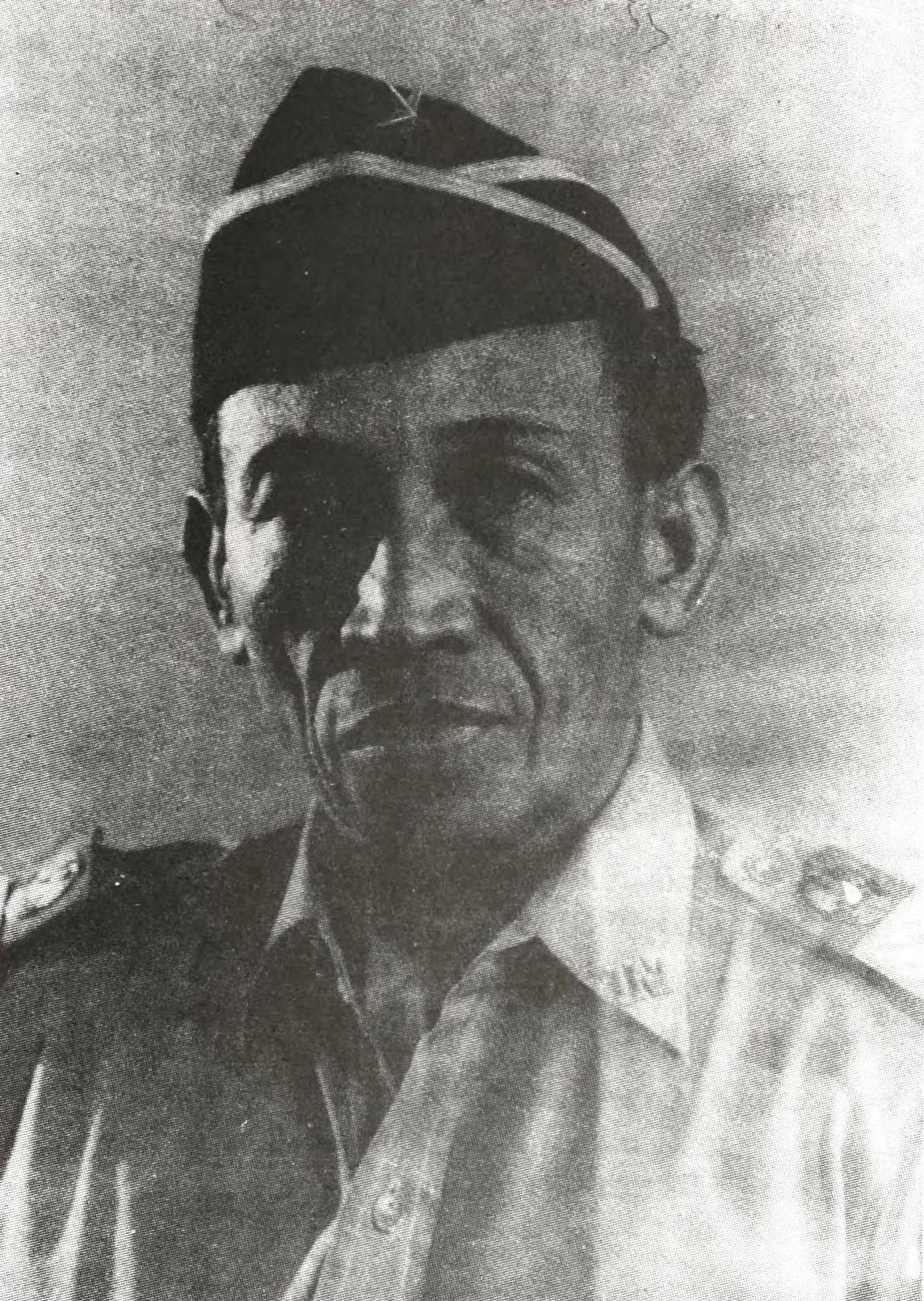

1st and 3rd Governor of Jakarta
- In office 15 July 1965 – 18 March 1966
- Preceded by: Henk Ngantung
- Succeeded by: Ali Sadikin
- In office 29 January 1960 – 26 August 1964
- Preceded by: Soediro (as Mayor)
- Succeeded by: Henk Ngantung

15th Minister of Home Affairs
- In office 27 August 1964 – 24 February 1966
- President: Sukarno
- Preceded by: Ipik Gandamana
- Succeeded by: Basuki Rahmat

Personal details
- Born: Soemarno Sosroatmodjo; 24 April 1911 Rambipuji, Jember, Dutch East Indies
- Died: 9 January 1991 (aged 79) Jakarta, Indonesia
- Education: Padjadjaran University; Vanderbilt University

Soemarno Sosroatmodjo (24 April 1911 – 9 January 1991) was an Indonesian soldier, doctor and politician who served as both governor of Jakarta and Minister of Home Affairs of Indonesia.

He served two terms as Governor of Jakarta. His first term as governor was from 29 January 1960, until 26 August 1964. He was appointed Indonesian Minister of the Interior on 27 August 1964, and his deputy governor at the time, the painter artist Henk Ngantung replacing him as Jakarta governor. Soemarno Sosroatmojo served as a government minister until 28 March 1966.

With the failing health of Ngantung, President Sukarno requested from Soemarno Sosroatmodjo to re-assume the position of governor on 15 July 1965, for a second term until 28 April 1966, when Ali Sadikin became governor.

Soemarno Sosroatmodjo was married and had seven children.
