= Ali Sadikin =

Indonesian politician and military officer (1926–2008)

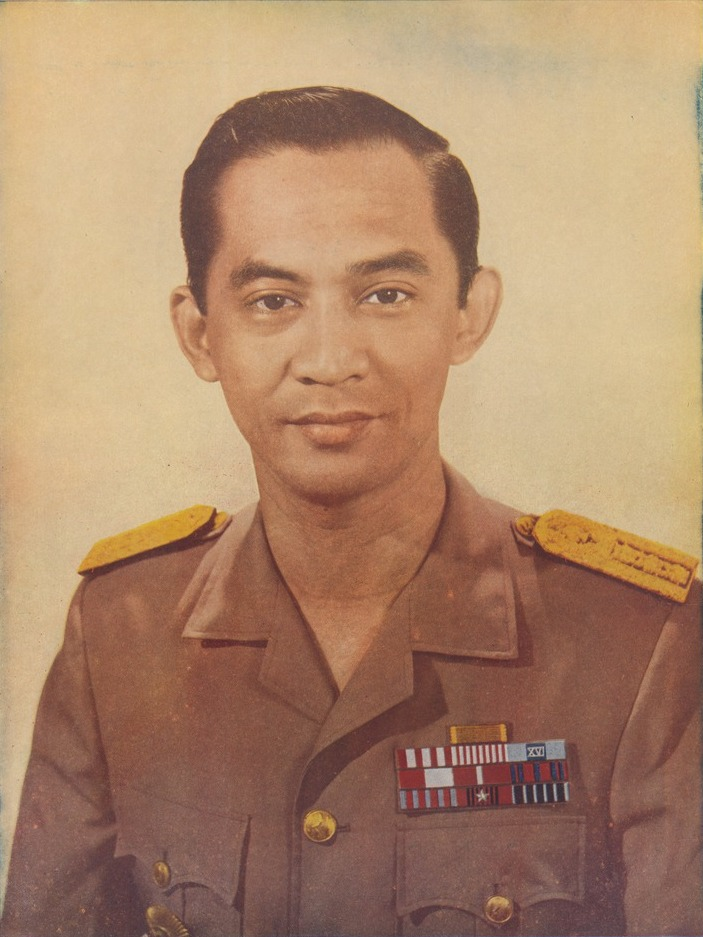
- Official portrait, 1966

1st Coordinating Minister for Maritime Affairs
- In office 27 August 1964 – 28 March 1966
- President: Sukarno
- Preceded by: Office created
- Succeeded by: Jatidjan

16th Minister of Transportation
- In office 13 November 1963 – 28 March 1966
- President: Sukarno
- Preceded by: Abdoelmoettalip Danoeningrat
- Succeeded by: Susatyo Mardi

4th Governor of Jakarta
- In office 28 April 1966 – 5 July 1977
- Preceded by: Soemarno Sosroatmodjo; Basuki Rahmat (acting)
- Succeeded by: Tjokropranolo

8th Chairman of Football Association of Indonesia
- In office 1977–1981
- Preceded by: Moehono
- Succeeded by: Sjarnoebi Said

Personal details
- Born: 7 July 1926 Sumedang, Dutch East Indies
- Died: 20 May 2008 (aged 81) Singapore
- Spouses: Nani Arnasih (m. 1954; died 1986) Linda Syamsuddin (m. 1987)
- Children: 5
- Nickname: Bang Ali

Military service
- Allegiance: Indonesia
- Branch/service: Indonesian Navy
- Years of service: 1945–1966
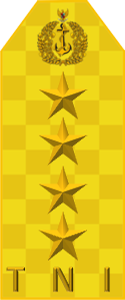
- Rank: General (honorary)
- Unit: KKO
- Battles/wars: Indonesian National Revolution; Operation Product; Operation Kraai; Permesta Rebellion

Ali Sadikin (7 July 1926 – 20 May 2008) was an Indonesian politician who served as the fourth governor of Jakarta from 1966 until 1977. Prior to becoming governor, he served as Minister of Transportation from 1963 until 1966 and Coordinating Minister for Marine Affairs from 1964 until 1966. He also served as Chairman of the Football Association of Indonesia from 1977 until 1981. Born to parents of ethnic-Sundanese descent, Ali attended the Semarang Shipping Science Polytechnic during the Japanese occupation period. During the Indonesian National Revolution, he joined the People's Security Agency Navy, the predecessor to the Indonesian Navy, and fought against the Dutch during Operation Product and Operation Kraai. Following the end of the national revolution, Ali remained in the navy and fought against the Permesta rebel movement in the late 1950s.

In 1963, he was appointed Minister of Transportation by President Sukarno. A year later, he was appointed coordinating minister of the newly formed Coordinating Ministry for Maritime and Investments Affairs. On 28 April 1966, Ali was appointed governor of Jakarta, becoming the first governor in Indonesia to be sworn-in at the Merdeka Palace. As governor, Ali carried out the construction of Jakarta's infrastructure. He constructed the Ismail Marzuki Park, Ragunan Zoo, Ancol Dreamland, and a number of other infrastructure projects. Notably, Ali allowed the construction of night entertainment projects, as well allowing entertainment in the form of gambling in Jakarta. With taxes generating from gambling being used to build the city and build the Jakarta Islamic Centre. Ali's governorship also saw the revival of Betawi culture in Jakarta, with the increased popularity of Ondel-ondel performances and the Betawi mask dance.

== Biography ==
=== Early life and education ===
Ali was born in Sumedang, West Java, on 7 July 1926, to Sundanese parents. He was the fifth child of six children from Raden Sadikin and Itjih Karnasih. His oldest brother, Hasan Sadikin, became a doctor whose name is immortalized in a hospital in Bandung; his second oldest brother owned a printing press; his third oldest brother Usman Sadikin, worked at Garuda Indonesia; his fourth oldest brother, Abu Sadikin, was a soldier in the Army; and his youngest brother is Said Sadikin. As a young boy, Ali wanted to become a sailor. During the Japanese occupation of Indonesia, he entered the Great Shipping Officer Education (P3B) which is now known as the Semarang Shipping Science Polytechnic.

=== Military service ===
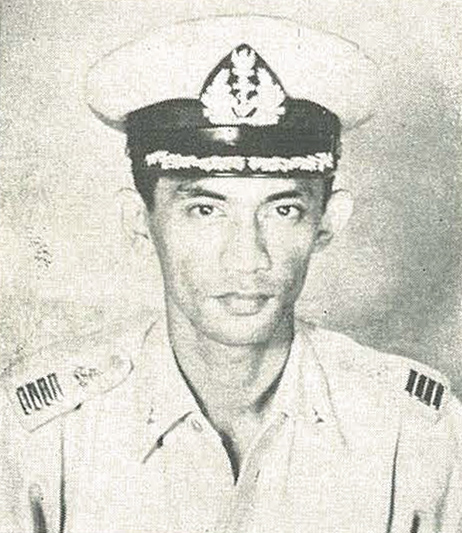
Ali Sadikin in 1960

During the war of independence, Ali joined the Naval Section of the People's Security Agency, the forerunner of the modern Indonesian Navy. He was sent to Tegal, Central Java to form a Navy base and Marine Corps. During the war, he fought against the Dutch during Operation Product and Operation Kraai. Ali Sadikin also helped crush Permesta in North Sulawesi. According to a story, he bravely advanced to the front line, running while firing a machine gun. One of his friends called his fighting "Hollywood Style."

=== Governor of Jakarta ===
==== Appointment ====
Ali Sadikin was directly inaugurated by President Sukarno as Governor of Jakarta on Thursday, 28 April 1966 at 10:00 at the Merdeka Palace. His inauguration was based on Presidential Decree No. 82/1966. In that decision, Ali, who is also a member of the staff of the Deputy Minister for Economics, Finance, and Development, was deemed capable and fulfilled the requirements to become the Governor of Jakarta.

==== Tenure ====
A former officer in the Indonesian Marine Corps, he saw the city as a battlefield. He sought to improve public services, clear out slum dwellers, ban becaks (cycle rickshaws), and outlaw street peddlers. Sadikin's role in bulldozing poor areas of Jakarta was part of a long history of struggle over land use in the region. Through legislation, Sadikin successfully wrested control over large amounts of poor housing. These areas he gave at minimal cost to developers such as the Jaya Group. For Abidin Kusno, Sadikin was part of a modernist program to attack irrationality, criminalize poverty, and create obedient national citizens. At the same time, he sought to kampung-ize city dwellers—to reinvest them with village sociality and mutual aid (gotong royong).

Ali also tried to halt migration into Jakarta by declaring the city closed to newcomers. He issued residency cards in hope of enforcing the policy, but failed to curtail population growth. One of the earliest and most outspoken advocates of family planning, Sadikin showed that Muslim groups would support these policies. Under Sadikin, Jakartan pilgrimage to Mecca and other holy places surged. Hungry for revenue for his projects, Sadikin legalized gambling and steambaths (de facto brothels), much to the outrage of many Muslim groups. Although Sadikin's restructuring of land in Jakarta displaced countless urban poor, he also advocated for the LBH, the Legal Aid Society; an organization which was used by both the private sector and the urban poor.

Ali also carried out the construction of Jakarta's infrastructure. Notably, he oversaw the construction and inauguration of Ismail Marzuki Park, an arts, cultural, and science center located at Cikini in Jakarta, Indonesia, on the site of what was then the Ragunan zoo. Taman Ismail Marzuki complex comprises a number of facilities including six performing arts theaters, cinemas, exhibition hall, gallery, libraries and an archive building. He also oversaw the moving of Ragunan zoo to its present location, which was officially reopened on June 22, 1966, managed by the city administration. His administration also saw the development of Ancol Dreamland, a resort destination located along Jakarta's waterfront, in Ancol (Kelurahan), Pademangan, Indonesia, on the site of what was previously a mosquito-infested swamps and fish ponds, and the source of century-old malaria outbreak in Jakarta. The first facility was the Bina Ria Ancol beach, best known for its drive-in theater especially during the 1970s, then followed with a golf course, swimming pool, oceanarium, Putri Duyung cottage, Hotel Horison and its casino. Ali's administration was also responsible for the construction of the Senen Project.

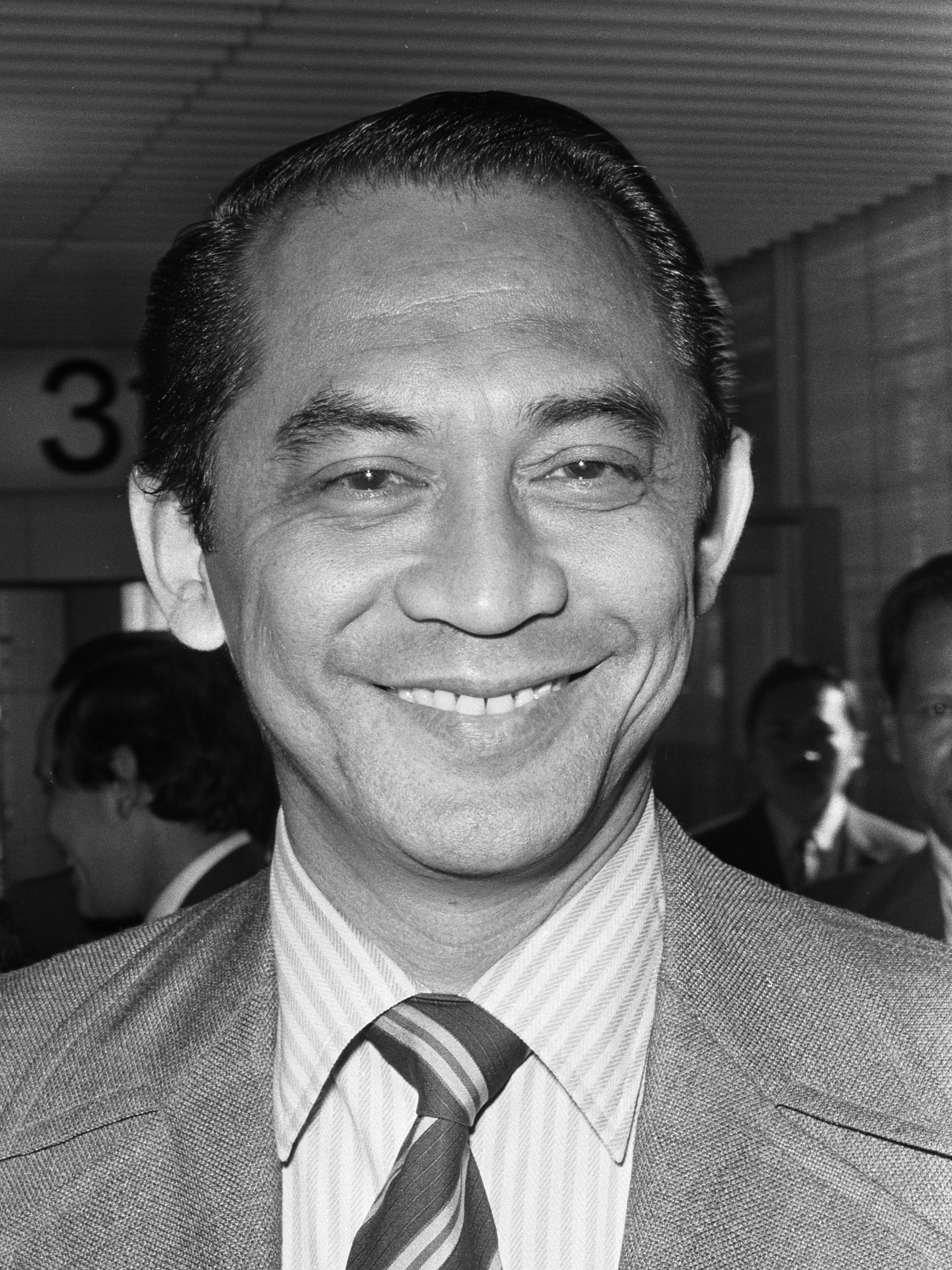
Ali in 1975

During the 1960s, he founded an advocacy group for the waria. In 1975, Sadikin famously attended the wedding of Indonesia's first trans woman legally recognised as her true gender, Vivian Rubiyanti Iskandar. After having allegedly "allowed" Golkar to lose an election in Jakarta, Sadikin was removed from office. Despite Sadikin's heavy-handed urban reforms, he is often cited as a popular leader. In 1978, mass student protests embroiled the capital, and students nominated Sadikin as an alternative president.

=== Post-governorship ===
==== Petition of Fifty ====
The Petition of Fifty is a document criticizing President Suharto's use of the state philosophy, Pancasila, against his political opponents. The petition was published on May 5, 1980 in Jakarta. The petition emerged as an expression of concern and concern by 50 influential military and private figures in Indonesia. The contents of Petition of Fifty include that the Suharto has considered himself to be the embodiment of Pancasila. Suharto considered any criticism of him to be a critique of the state ideology of Pancasila. Suharto, among other things, used Pancasila as a tool to threaten his enemies.

Participants of the Petition of Fifty included a group of powerful and highly influential critics of the New Order, including former Chief of Staff of the Armed Forces General Abdul Haris Nasution, former National Police Chief Hoegeng Imam Santoso, and former Prime Ministers Burhanuddin Harahap and Mohammad Natsir. Ali also helped found and led the Petition of Fifty. Reportedly, he regularly hosted meetings of the petition at his home. Though he remained a resolute statist in favor of militarism, he opposed President Suharto's consolidation of power in the government and military (ABRI). It is likely that Sadikin's stature and popularity both bolstered the Petition of Fifty and helped to shield it from more severe repression.

=== Death ===
Sadikin died in Singapore on May 20, 2008, and was buried in Tanah Kusir Cemetery, Jakarta the next day.

He was posthumously promoted from lieutenant general to the honorary rank of general by the President Prabowo Subianto on 10 August 2025 for his service to the country.

== Personal life ==
Ali was first married to Nani Sadikin, a dentist who became commonly known throughout Jakarta as Mpok Nani. However, Nani died in 1986, and Ali later remarried to a woman named Linda Syamsuddin Mangan. Together with Nani, Ali had 4 children, namely Boy Sadikin, Benyamin Irwansyah Putra, Edi Trisnadi Putra, and Irawan Hernadi Putra.With Linda, Ali had one son named Yasser Ali Umarsyah Sadikin.

== Bibliography ==
- Bang Ali demi Jakarta (1966-1977): Memoar (Indonesian) by Ali Sadikin, Ramadhan K. H., Jakarta Raya (Indonesia) Pustaka Sinar Harapan. 1992.
- Tantangan Demokrasi (Indonesian) by Ali Sadikin. Pustaka Sinar Harapan. 1995.
- Pers Bertanya, Bang Ali Menjawab (Indonesian) by Ali Sadikin, Ramadhan K. H. Pustaka Jaya. 1995.

Political offices
Preceded by Soemarno Sosroatmodjo	Governor of Jakarta; 1966–1977	Succeeded by Tjokropranolo
Sporting positions
Preceded by Moehono	Chairman of PSSI; 1978–1981	Succeeded by Sjarnoebi Said
