= Star of Mahaputera =

Second-highest Indonesian honor award

Star of Mahaputera Bintang Mahaputera
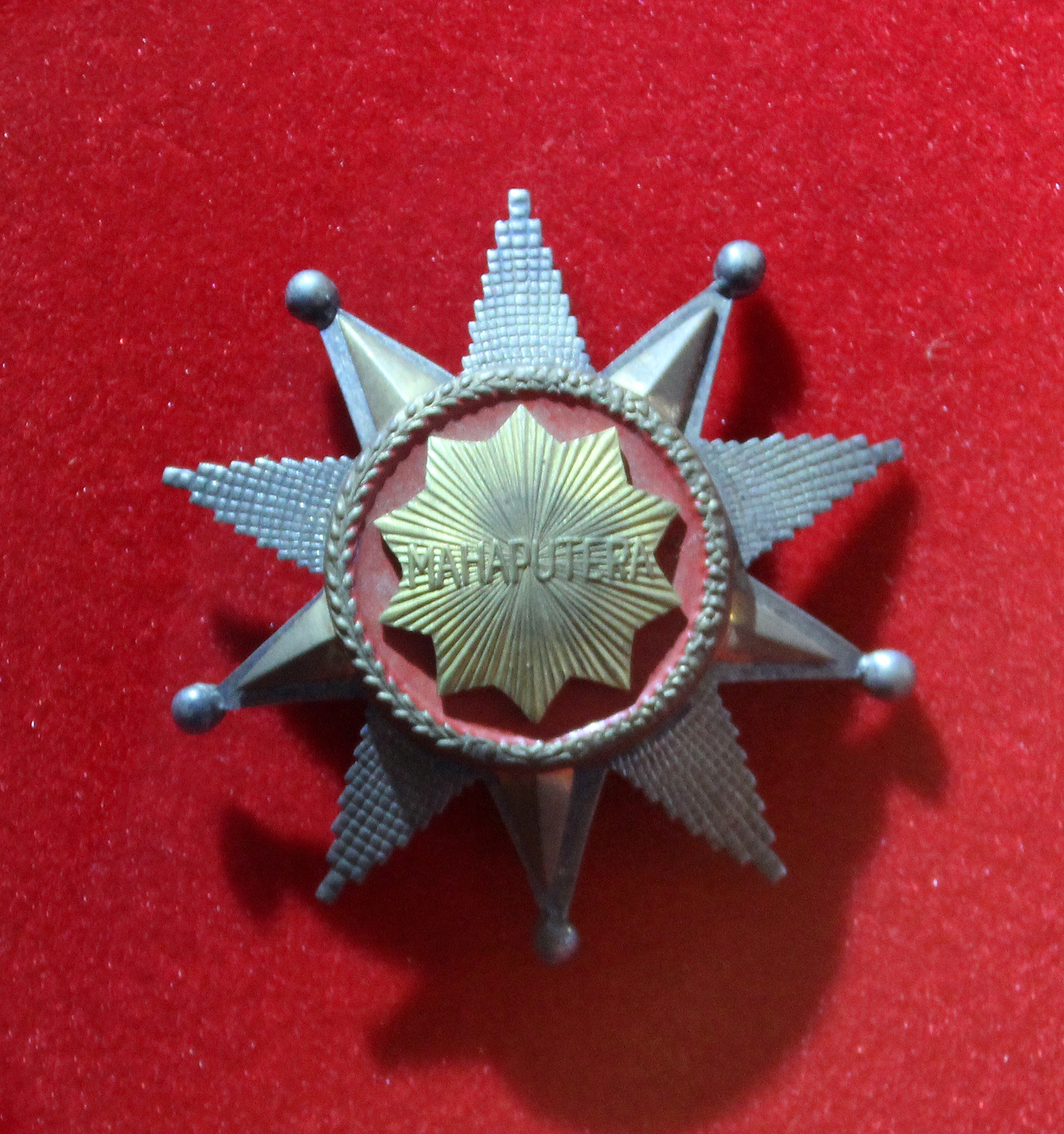

Awarded by President of Indonesia
- Type: Order
- Established: 1959
- Country: Indonesia
- Eligibility: Civilian
- Status: Currently awarded
- Grand Master: President of Indonesia

Statistics
- First induction: 1959
- Last induction: 2026

Precedence
- Next (higher): Star of the Republic of Indonesia
- Next (lower): Star of Service; Star of Humanities; Star of the Upholder of Democracy; Cultural Merit Star; Guerilla Star; The Sacred Star; Military Distinguished Service Star
- Ribbon bar of Adipurna class Ribbon bar of Adipradana class Ribbon bar of Utama class Ribbon bar of Pratama class Ribbon bar of Nararya class

Star of Mahaputera (Indonesian: Bintang Mahaputera) is the second highest honorary award awarded by the Government of the Republic of Indonesia, one level below the Star of the Republic of Indonesia. This honorary award was officially established in 1959.

The star is given to those who extraordinarily maintain the integrity, continuity and glory of the Unitary State of the Republic of Indonesia. The President of the Republic of Indonesia bestows the star, and subsequently he or she, as well as the Vice President of the Republic of Indonesia, are automatically awarded the highest star, the "Bintang Mahaputera Adipurna".

== Classes ==
The Mahaputera Star is awarded in five classes as follows.

Adipurna (1st class)	Adipradana (2nd class)	Utama (3rd class)	Pratama (4th class)	Nararya (5th class)
Adipurna; 1st class	Adipradana; 2nd class	Utama; 3rd class	Pratama; 4th class	Nararya; 5th class

1. Adipurna – wearing a star on the sash ribbon on the right shoulder and a patra on the left chest.
2. Adipradana – wearing a star on the sash ribbon on the right shoulder and a patra on the left chest.
3. Utama – wearing a star on a necklace ribbon around the neck and a patra on the left chest.
4. Pratama – wearing a star on a necklace ribbon around the neck and a patra on the left chest.
5. Nararya – wearing a star on a necklace ribbon around the neck and a patra on the left chest.

== Recipients of the 1st Class ==
Name	Title	Legal Basis	Year	Ref.
Abdul Halim of Kedah	Yang di-Pertuan Agong of Malaysia		16 March 1970	
Abdurrahman Wahid	President of Indonesia	Keppres No.16/TK/2001	23 February 2001	
Adam Malik	Vice President of Indonesia	Keppres No.13/TK/1978	23 March 1978	
Agus Salim	National Hero of Indonesia	-	1961	
B. J. Habibie	President of Indonesia	Keppres No.22/TK/1998	12 March 1998	
Beatrix	Queen of the Netherlands			
Boediono	Vice President of Indonesia		2009	
Dina Boluarte	President of Peru		11 August 2025	
Gibran Rakabuming Raka	Pasal 10 ayat (2) UU No. 20/2009	20 October 2024		
Hamengkubuwono I	Sultan of Yogyakarta, National Hero	Keppres No.85/TK/2006	3 November 2006	
Susilo Bambang Yudhoyono	President of Indonesia			
Hamzah Haz	Vice President of Indonesia	Keppres No.67/TK/2001	8 August 2001	
Hasri Ainun Besari	First Lady of Indonesia	Keppres No.41/TK/1998	28 May 1998	
Imelda Marcos	First Lady of the Philippines		January 1968	
Joko Widodo	President of Indonesia			
Ki Hadjar Dewantara	National Hero, Teacher, Politician	-	15 February 1961	
Lee Soon-ja	First Lady of South Korea	-	25 June 1981	
Ma'ruf Amin	Vice President of Indonesia	Keppres No.113/TK/2019	22 October 2019	
Megawati Soekarnoputri	President of Indonesia	Keppres No.17/TK/2001	23 February 2001	
Jusuf Kalla	Vice President of Indonesia	Keppres No.84/TK/2004	27 October 2004	
Pangeran Sambernyowo	Adipati Praja Mangkunegaran	Keppres No.48/TK/1988	17 August 1988	
Prabowo Subianto	President of Indonesia	Pasal 10 ayat (1) UU No. 20/2009	20 October 2024	
Saleha	Queen consort of Brunei			
Empress Michiko	Crown Princess of Japan		31 January 1962	
Suharto	President of Indonesia	Keppres No.29/TK/1988	27 May 1988	
Sukarno	President of Indonesia	Pasal 3 UU Darurat No. 6 Tahun 1959	1959	
Hamengkubuwono IX	Vice President of Indonesia	Pasal 3 UU Darurat No. 6 Tahun 1959		
Sudharmono	Vice President of Indonesia	Vice Pres	Keppres No.10/TK/1988	29 March 1988
Sudirman	Commander of the Indonesian National Armed Forces	-	3 February 1961	
Try Sutrisno	Vice President of Indonesia	Keppres No.18/TK/1993	17 March 1993	
Willem-Alexander	King of Netherlands			
Yasuhiro Nakasone	Prime Minister of Japan		1983	
Queen Sirikit	Queen of Thailand		1961	

== Recipients of the 2nd Class ==
- Abdul Gafur (1982)
- K.H. Abdul Halim Majalengka (2008)^{P}
- Abdul Haris Nasution (1961)
- Abdurrahman Baswedan (2013)^{P}
- Aburizal Bakrie (2011)
- Achmad Affandi (1982)
- Achmad Lamo (1982)
- Achmad Soebardjo (1973)
- Adam Malik (1973)
- Adnan Kapau Gani (1995)^{P}
- Adrianus Mooy (1992)
- K.H. Ahmad Sanusi (2009)^{P}
- Akbar Tanjung (1992)
- Ali Alatas (1992)
- Ali Moertopo (1982)
- Ali Sadikin (2003)
- Ali Sastroamidjojo
- Amirmachmud (1973)
- Andi Amir M. Jusuf (1973)
- Andi Mattalatta (2014)
- Andi Sultan Daeng Radja (2006)^{P}
- Anwar Tjokroaminoto (1973)
- Arief Koeshariadi (1998)
- Ario Soerjo (1999)^{P}
- Artidjo Alkostar (2021)^{P}
- Hamzah Haz (2011)
- Assaat (1995)
- Ashari Danudirdjo (1997)
- Awaloedin Djamin (1982)
- Azwar Anas (1992)
- A.E. Manihuruk (1992)
- A.M. Fatwa (2008)
- A.M. Hendropriyono (1999)
- A.R. Soehoed (1982)
- B. J. Habibie (1982)
- Basuki Hadimuljono (2020)
- Basuki Rahmat (1995)
- Boediono (1999)
- Boentaran Martoatmodjo (1992)^{P}
- Chairul Tanjung (2014)
- Dadang Suprayogi (1967)
- Dahlan Iskan (2014)
- Dipo Alam (2014)
- Emil Salim (1973)
- Erick Thohir (2024)
- Fatmawati (1994)
- Feisal Tanjung (1995)
- Frans Kaisiepo (1993)^{P}
- Frans Seda (1973)
- Gatot Nurmantyo (2020)
- Ginandjar Kartasasmita (1987)
- G.A. Siwabessy (1973)
- Hamengkubuwana IX (1961)
- Hamzah Haz (1999)
- Harmoko (1987)
- Harsono Tjokroaminoto (1990)
- Harun Al Rasyid Zain (1982)
- Hasan Basri Durin (1999)
- K.H. Hasyim Muzadi (2017)^{P}
- Hatta Rajasa (2013)
- Herawati Boediono (2014)
- Hidayat Nur Wahid (2009)
- H.O.S. Tjokroaminoto (1961)^{P}
- I Gusti Ketut Jelantik (1993)^{P}
- Ibnu Sutowo (1972)
- Ibrahim Hasan (1996)
- Ida Anak Agung Gde Agung (1995)
- Ida Bagus Oka (1999)
- Habib Idrus bin Salim Al-Jufri (2010)^{P}
- Ilyas Ya'kub (1999)^{P}
- Iskandar Muda dari Aceh (1993)^{P}
- Ismail Hasan Metareum (1996)
- Iwa Koesoemasoemantri (1992)^{P}
- Izaak Huru Doko (2006)^{P}
- Jahja Daniel Dharma (2009)^{P}
- Jannes Humuntal Hutasoit (1987)
- Juliana Djoeanda (1993)^{P}
- Karlinah Wirahadikusumah (1987)
- Ki Bagoes Hadikoesoemo (1992)^{P}
- Ki Sarmidi Mangunsarkoro (1995)^{P}
- Kusumah Atmaja (1995)^{P}
- Kwik Kian Gie (2005)
- La Maddukelleng (1998)^{P}
- Lasiyah Soetanto (1982)
- Lukman Hakim Saifuddin (2014)
- L.B. Moerdani (1987)
- Johannes Latuharhary (1992)^{P}
- Johannes Leimena (1973)
- Mahfud MD (2013)
- Mangkunegara IV (2010)^{P}
- Maraden Panggabean (1970)
- Mari Elka Pangestu (2013)
- Marthen Indey (1993)
- Martono (1982)
- Marzuki Alie (2014)
- K.H. Mas Mansoer (1961)
- Ma'ruf Amin (2014)
- Megawati Soekarnoputri (2001)
- Mochtar Kusumaatmadja (1974)
- Moeldoko (2015)
- Moestopo (2007)^{P}
- Mohammad Yamin (1962)
- Mohamad Roem (1984)
- Mufidah Jusuf Kalla (2011)
- Muhaimin Iskandar (2009)
- Muhammad Lutfi (2014)
- Muhammad Quraish Shihab (2005)
- M. Sarbini (1973)
- M.H. Thamrin (1961)^{P}
- Nani Soedarsono (1987)
- Nelly Adam Malik (1982)
- K.H. Noer Alie (2006)^{P}
- Nuku Muhammad Amiruddin (1995)^{P}
- Oerip Soemohardjo (1961)^{P}
- Opu Daeng Risadju (2006)^{P}
- Otto Iskandardinata (1961)^{P}
- Pajonga Daeng Ngalie Karaeng Polongbangkeng (2006)^{P}
- Pakubuwana X (2009)^{P}
- Panji Surachman Cokroadisuryo (1992)^{P}
- Patrialis Akbar (2014)
- Poedjono Pranyoto (1999)
- Radius Prawiro (1973)
- Radjiman Wedyodiningrat (1961)^{P}
- Rahmah El Yunusiyah (2013)^{P}
- Rais Abin (2007)
- Raja Haji Fisabilillah (1997)^{P}
- Ranggawarsita (2010)^{P}
- Ratu Emma Norma Soedharmono (1992)
- Retno Marsudi (2020)
- Robert Wolter Mongisidi (1961)^{P}
- Roeslan Abdulgani (1961)
- Roy Suryo (2014)
- Saiful Sulun (1992)
- Raden Saleh (2010)^{P}
- Raden Widodo (1983)
- Sam Ratulangi (1961)^{P}
- Sanusi Hardjadinata (2001)
- Prof. Dr. Sardjito (1970)^{P}
- Mr. Sartono (1961)
- Sarwo Edhie Wibowo (1986)
- Sayuti Melik (1973)
- Dr. Setiabudi (1961)^{P}
- Saldi Isra (2023)
- Silas Papare (1993)^{P}
- Siti Fadilah (2011)
- Siti Rahmiati Hatta (1993)
- Slamet Rijadi (2007)^{P}
- Sri Mulyani (2011)
- Sudharmono (1973)
- Sudirman (1961)^{P}
- Soekarni (1973)^{P}
- Soekiman Wirjosandjojo (1985)^{P}
- Soemitro Djojohadikoesoemo (1973)
- Soengkono (1980)^{P}
- Soepardjo Rustam (1987)
- Soerjopranoto (1961)^{P}
- R.P. Soeroso (1974)^{P}
- Soesanto Tirtoprodjo (1992)^{P}
- Bung Tomo (2008)^{P}
- Dr. Soetomo (1961)^{P}
- Dr. Sudarsono (1995)^{P}
- Sudi Silalahi (2013)
- Sugandhi Kartosubroto (1992)^{P}
- Sukma Violetta (2023)
- Sumantri Brodjonegoro (1973)
- Sunario Sastrowardoyo (1985)
- Ir. Sutami (1973)
- Sutan Mohammad Rasjid (2000)
- Sutan Takdir Alisjahbana (2010)^{P}
- Suyono Sosrodarsono (1987)
- Susi Pudjiastuti (2020)
- Suwiryo (1995)^{P}
- Syarwan Hamid (1999)
- Syarief Thayeb (1974)
- Syarif Kasim II dari Siak (1998)^{P}
- Tuanku Tambusai (1995)^{P}
- Tarmizi Taher (1996)
- Teuku Muhammad Hasan (1983)
- Tjilik Riwut (1998)^{P}
- Tjipto Mangoenkoesoemo (1961)^{P}
- Tito Karnavian (2020)
- Try Sutrisno (1992)
- Tuti Sutiawati Try Sutrisno (1996)
- T.B. Simatupang (1995)^{P}
- Umar Wirahadikusumah (1973)
- Valentina Tereshkova (1963)
- Wahono (1992)
- Wiranatakoesoema V (1992)^{P}
- Wiranto (1998)
- Wirjono Prodjodikoro (1995)^{P}
- Wismoyo Arismunandar (1995)
- Wongsonegoro (1992)^{P}
- Wury Estu Handayani (2023)
- Yasonna Laoly (2020)
- Yogie Suardi Memet (1996)
- Yunus Yosfiah (1999)
- Yuri Gagarin (1961)
- Yusril Ihza Mahendra (2014)
- Yusuf Al-Makassari (1995)^{P}
- Zainul Arifin Pohan (1998)^{P}
- Zulkifli Hasan (2014)
- Prabowo Subianto (2024)
- Hadi Tjahjanto (2024)
- Bambang Soesatyo (2024)
- Andika Perkasa (2024)
- Yudo Margono (2024)
- Lodewijk Freidrich Paulus (2024)
- Sufmi Dasco Ahmad (2024)
- Rachmad Gobel (2024)
- Erick Thohir (2024)
- Bahlil Lahadalia (2024)
- Nadiem Makarim (2024)
- Ida Fauziyah (2024)
- Agus Gumiwang Kartasasmita (2024)
- Arifin Tasrif (2024)
- Abdul Halim Iskandar (2024)
- Suharso Monoarfa (2024)
- Teten Masduki (2024)
- Bintang Puspayoga (2024)
- ST Burhanuddin (2024)
- Luthfi bin Yahya (2024)
- Putri Kus Wisnu Wardani (2024)
- Agus Widjojo (2024)
- Idham Azis (2024)

Description:
^{P} Posthumous award.

== See also ==
- Orders, decorations, and medals of Indonesia
