= Inauguration of Prabowo Subianto =

2024 presidential inauguration in Indonesia

Presidential inauguration of Prabowo Subianto
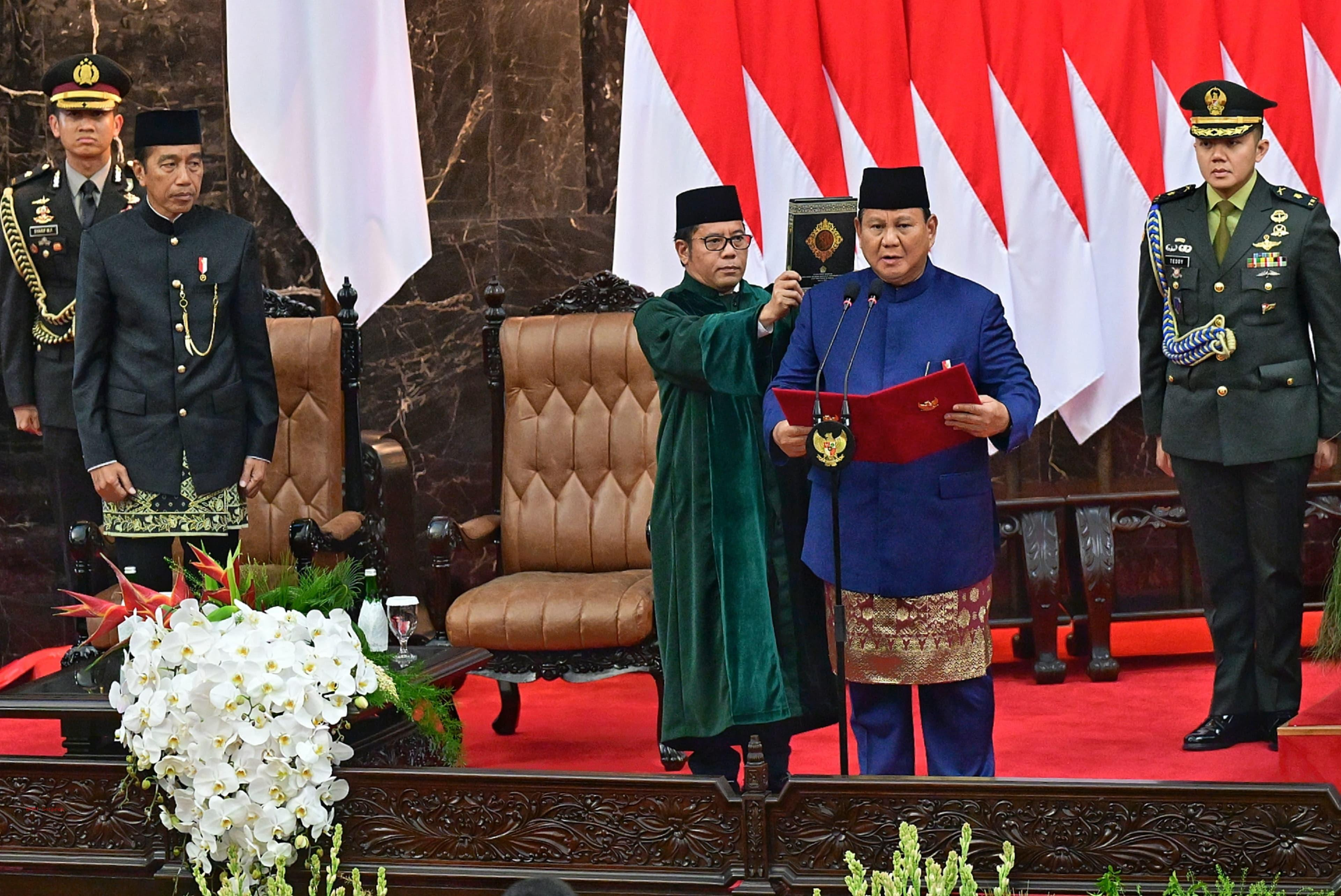
- President Prabowo Subianto taking his presidential oath in 2024
- Date: 20 October 2024; 2 years ago
- Location: Parliamentary Complex, Jakarta
- Organized by: People's Consultative Assembly
- Participants: Prabowo Subianto 8th president of Indonesia; Gibran Rakabuming Raka 14th vice president of Indonesia; — Assuming office: Joko Widodo 7th president of Indonesia; Ma'ruf Amin 13th vice president of Indonesia; — Leaving office

Prabowo Subianto was inaugurated as the president of Indonesia on 20 October 2024 at the Parliamentary Complex in Jakarta. This inauguration marks the start of the five-year term of Prabowo Subianto as president and Gibran Rakabuming Raka as vice president.

Prabowo and Gibran had won the 2024 presidential election with 58.59% of the vote against two of their opponents, Anies–Muhaimin and Ganjar–Mahfud. At 73 years, 3 days of age on inauguration day, Prabowo became the oldest person to assume Indonesian presidency, while his counterpart, Gibran, became the youngest person to assume Indonesian vice presidency at 37 years, 19 days of age.

== Context ==
Prabowo Subianto, Minister of Defense in the Onward Indonesia Cabinet under Joko Widodo, and Gibran Rakabuming, Mayor of Surakarta as well as Widodo's son, won the 2024 presidential election with 58.59% of the votes. Thus they defeated their opponents Anies Basweden and Muhaimin Iskandar, and Ganjar Pranowo and Mahfud MD. This marks Prabowo's fourth and final presidential run, following his vice-presidential bid in 2009 and presidential campaigns in 2014 and 2019, in which the latter two was defeated by Widodo.

There are controversies surrounding Gibran's candidacy, as the Indonesian Constitutional Court made a controversial ruling by allowing him to run as vice president. According to the ruling, candidates under the required age of 40 could seek for presidency or vice-presidency, given a condition that they held elected regional office in the past. As Gibran is a mayor and Widodo's son, speculation arose that the president himself influenced the ruling to further his legacy. Concerns were heightened by the involvement of Widodo's brother-in-law, Anwar Usman, the Chief Justice of the Constitutional Court during the ruling.

== Planning ==
=== Location ===
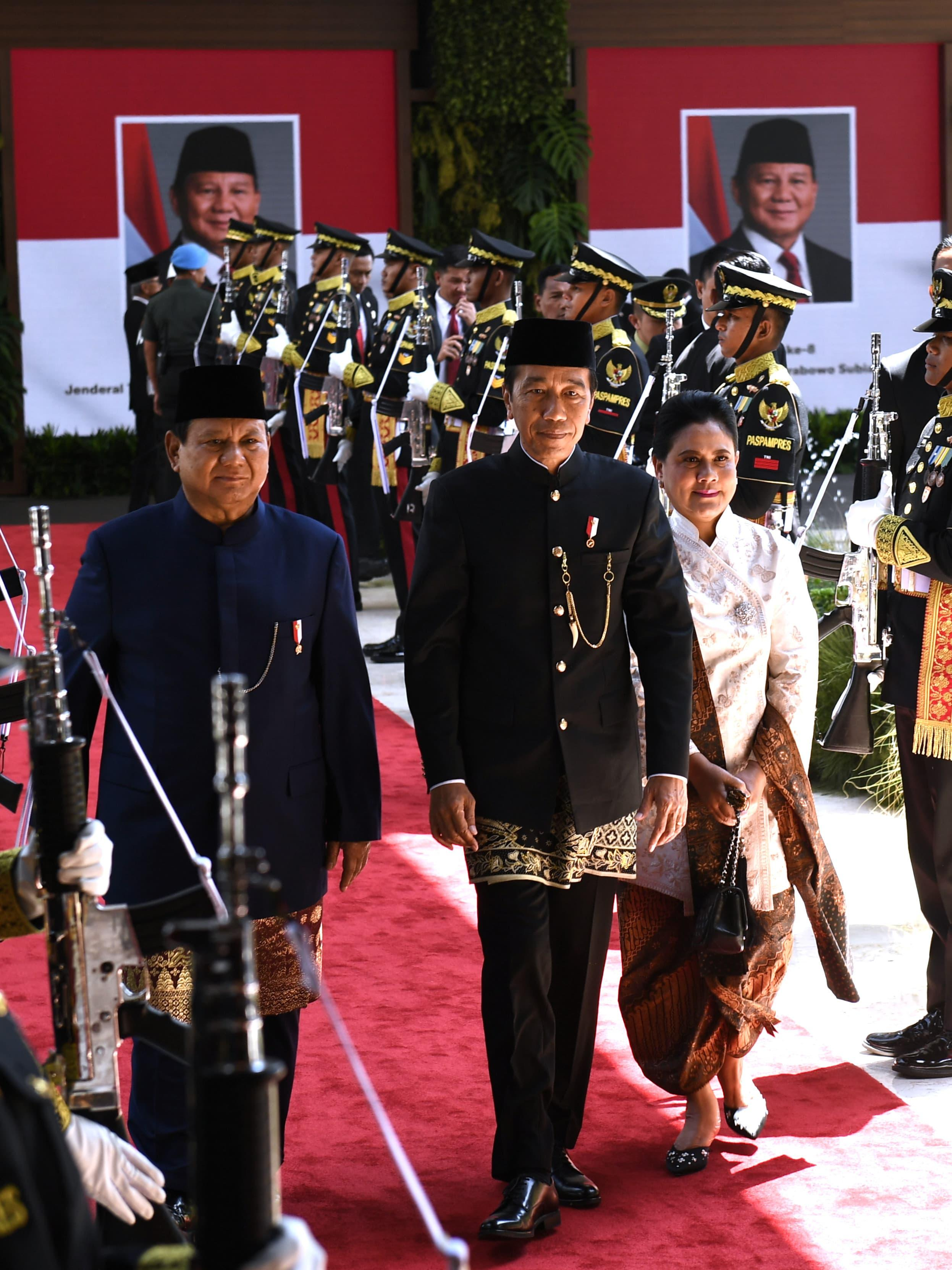
Prabowo (left) and outgoing Jokowi alongside his wife (right) arriving at Nusantara building, where the inauguration took place

The location for the inauguration was initially planned to take place in the currently constructed new capital city of the country, Nusantara. Minister of Public Works and Housing, Basuki Hadimuljono, previously stated that the inauguration will take place in Nusantara, same as the 2024 flag-raising ceremony of 17 August. However, on 28 June, deputy speaker of the People's Consultative Assembly, Ahmad Muzani, stated that the inauguration will remain to take place at the Parliamentary Complex in Jakarta.

=== Security ===
The Indonesian National Police held a rehearsal and parade on 13–14 October 2024 at the Mobile Brigade Corps Headquarters in West Java to secure the inauguration event. Additionally, the police also collaborated with the Indonesian National Armed Forces and its service branches, including the Army, Navy, and Air Force, for surveillance, patrols, and VIP protocols during the event. On the inauguration day, the police and the military deployed 115,000 personnel, with 100,000 from the military and 15,000 from the police.

== Inaugural events ==
=== Oaths of office ===
Prabowo and Gibran taking the oaths of office

Every Indonesian elected president and vice president must recite the oath of office in front of the People's Consultative Assembly. The oath of office is always administered by a cleric (rohaniwan) according to the reciter's religion; in Prabowo's and Gibran's cases, by Islamic clerics and sworn under the Quran. Prabowo (and Gibran) recited the following:

Bismillahirrahmanirrahim. Demi Allah, saya bersumpah: akan memenuhi kewajiban (Wakil) Presiden Republik Indonesia dengan sebaik-baiknya dan seadil-adilnya, memegang teguh Undang-Undang Dasar dan menjalankan segala undang-undang dan peraturannya dengan selurus-lurusnya, serta berbakti kepada nusa dan bangsa.

[In the name of Allah, the Most Gracious, the Most Merciful. By the name of Allah, I swear: to fulfill the obligations of the (Vice) President of the Republic of Indonesia to the best of my ability and as justly as possible, to uphold the Constitution and to implement all of its laws and regulations with utmost integrity, and to serve the nation and the people.]

After the recitation of the oaths of office by both president and vice president, the event was continued by the signing of the minutes (berita acara) regarding the inauguration.

=== Inaugural address ===
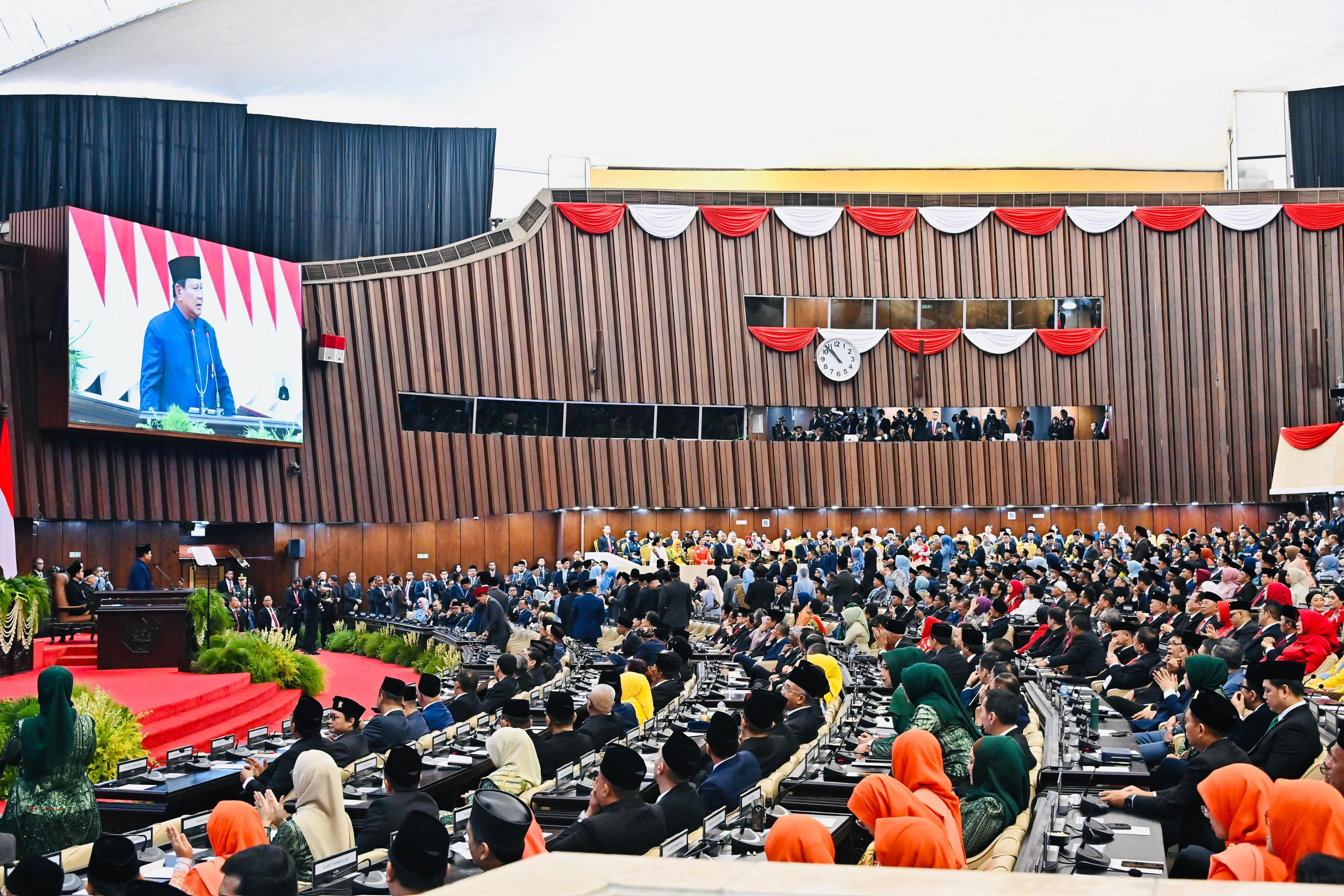
Prabowo delivering his inaugural address at the parliament

In his inaugural address at the parliament, Prabowo discussed many aspects, starting from corruption, poverty, food and energy self-sufficiency, raw commodity processing (hilirisasi), to Palestinian independence.

==== Food and energy self-sufficiency ====
Prabowo set a target for his administration to achieve food self-sufficiency (swasembada pangan) and make Indonesia as the world's food basket. He is optimistic that this goal can be achieved within four to five years. Additionally, Prabowo announced that his administration would also pursue energy self-sufficiency (swasembada energi). He believes that the global geopolitical situation makes it crucial for Indonesia to achieve food and energy self-sufficiency.

==== Palestinian independence ====
Another topic brought by Prabowo on his address is Palestinian independence. He emphasized Indonesia's support for Palestinian independence, citing Indonesia's anti-colonial principles and Indonesia's past history of colonization. Members of parliament then reacted by chanting "free Palestine!" In an earlier address, Speaker of the People's Consultative Assembly, Ahmad Muzani, also expressed hope that Prabowo would continue to advocate for Palestinian independence from Israeli occupation.

=== Other occurrences ===
==== Widodo family booed ====
Before the inauguration, some members of parliament clapped and some booed the attending Widodo family—Bobby Nasution, Kahiyang Ayu, and Kaesang Pangarep—when the camera highlighted them on the screen. Habiburokhman, a member of House of Representative from Gerindra Party witnessed and stated that the booed came only from several members of the parliament known for being the political rivalries of Joko Widodo.

==== Standing ovation for Joko Widodo ====
During an inaugural address by the Speaker of People's Consultative Assembly, Ahmad Muzani, all members of parliament spontaneously made a standing ovation and sang Terima Kasih Jokowi (Thank You Jokowi) to appreciate his legacy as president of Indonesia for two terms.

== Post-inaugural events ==
=== Farewell and welcoming ceremony ===
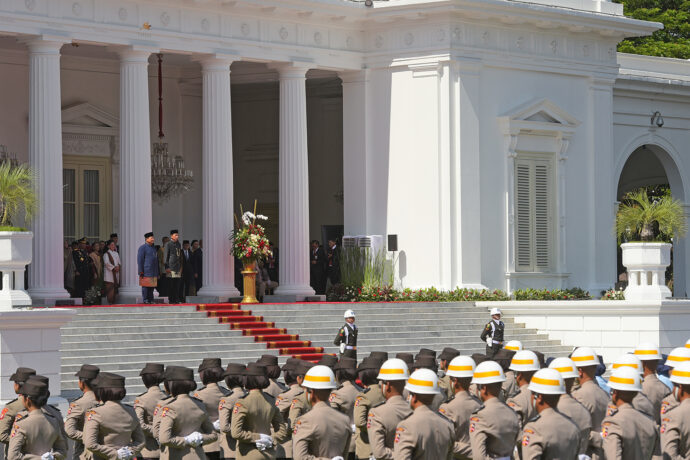
Prabowo and Jokowi during the farewell and welcoming ceremony

Former President Joko Widodo welcomed the newly inaugurated president and vice president at Merdeka Palace after their arrival from the inauguration. The ceremony began with National Armed Forces and National Police servicemen entering the ceremonial court and concluded with the national anthem and a troop inspection by Widodo and the newly inaugurated President Prabowo Subianto. Widodo and his wife, Iriana, then departed for Halim Perdanakusuma Airport to return to their home city of Surakarta aboard an Air Force aircraft.

=== Festival ===
Festival (pesta rakyat) in Central Jakarta to commemorate the inauguration featured 13 stages at various locations, some showcasing distinct regional themes from Indonesia's five main islands. The event took place along the Sudirman and Thamrin Avenues, with performances by artists and bands such as Dewa 19 and Kotak. Road blockades are done for the festivals and presidential motorcade from the Parliamentary Complex to the Merdeka Palace and was opened subsequently after.

=== State dinner ===
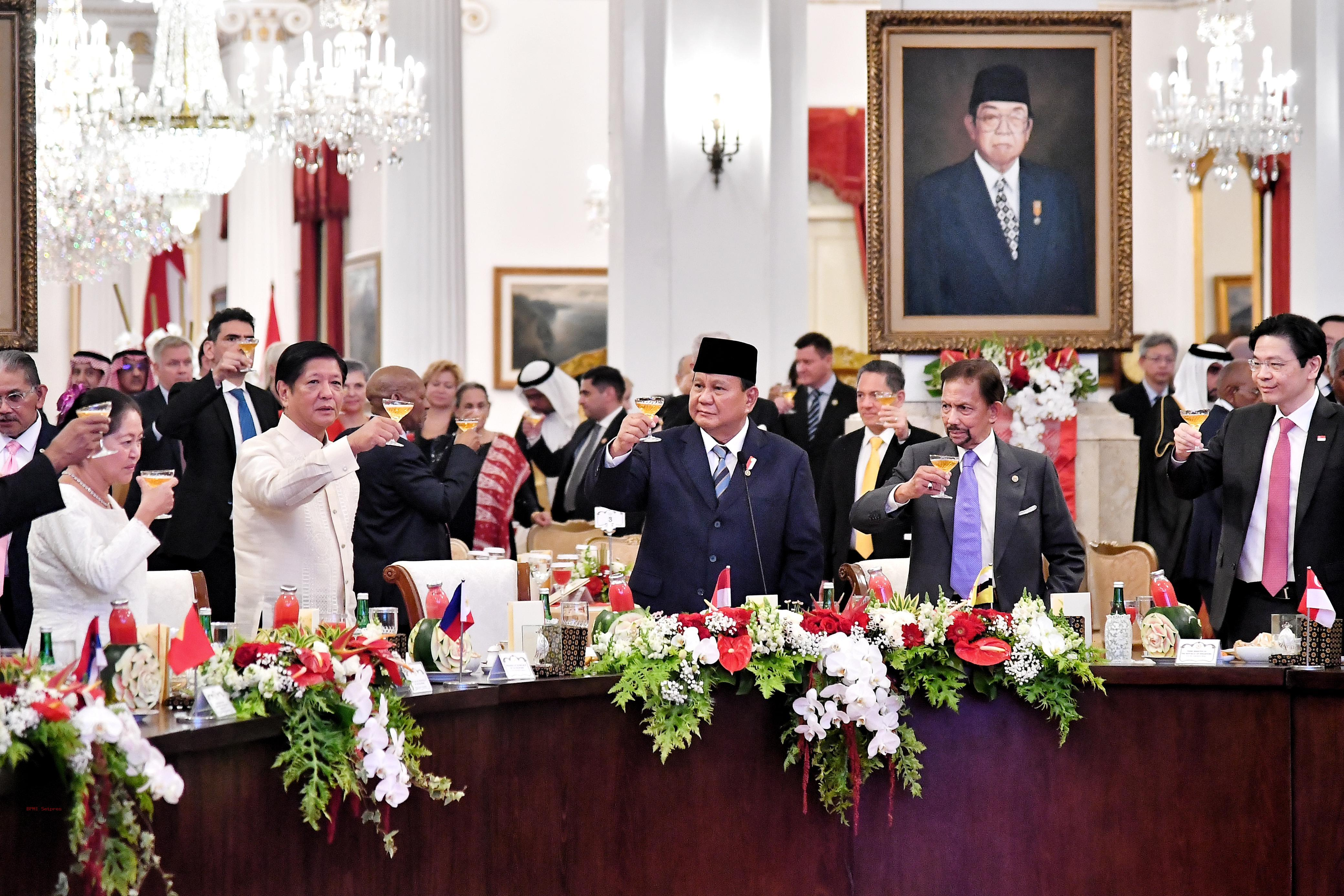
State leaders and guests toasting at the state dinner

A state dinner was held at Merdeka Palace on Monday evening, attended by foreign leaders and other representatives who came for the inauguration. These included Sultan and Prime Minister of Brunei Hassanal Bolkiah; President of the Philippines Bongbong Marcos and first lady Liza Araneta Marcos; Vice Presidents of Laos and PRC, Pany Yathotou and Han Zheng; Prime Minister of Papua New Guinea James Marape, Miloš Vučević of Serbia, Lawrence Wong of Singapore and spouse Loo Tze Lui, Jeremiah Manele of Solomon Islands, Han Duck-soo of South Korea, Xanana Gusmão of Timor-Leste, Charlot Salwai of Vanuatu and spouse Marie-Justine Salwai; Deputy Prime Minister Richard Marles of Australia, Winston Peters of New Zealand, Khalid bin Mohammad Al Attiyah of Qatar, Denis Manturov of Russia; Foreign Minister Nancy Namrouqa of Jordan, Adel al-Jubeir of Saudi Arabia, David Lammy of UK; Awqaf Minister of Egypt Usama Al-Sayyid Al-Azhari; Tolerance Minister of State of United Arab Emirates Nahyan bin Mubarak Al Nahyan; Deputy Defense Minister of Italy Matteo Perego di Cremnago; as well as Representative of the United States to the United Nations Linda Thomas-Greenfield. Prabowo was then scheduled to announce the new cabinet after the event.

=== Cabinet announcement ===
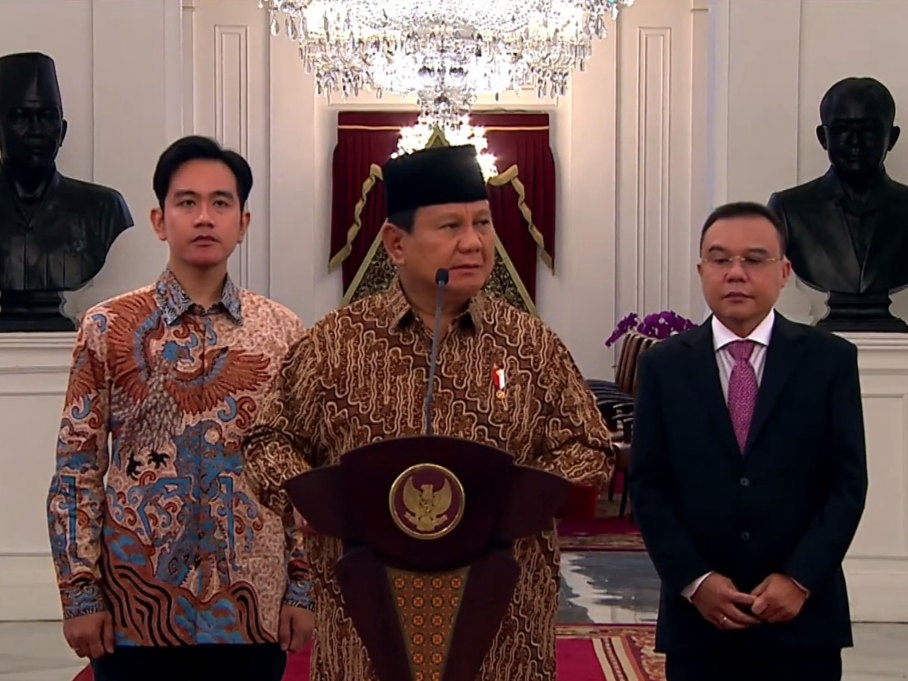
Prabowo announcing the new Red and White Cabinet

Prabowo announced from Merdeka Palace on Monday evening that his new cabinet will be called the Red and White Cabinet (Kabinet Merah Putih). The cabinet consists of 48 ministers, an increase from 34 in the previous administration, with some new ministries created or split from existing ones. Several ministers from the previous administration, such as Sri Mulyani, Bahlil Lahadalia, Tito Karnavian, and Budi Arie Setiadi, have either retained their positions or assigned to a new ministry.

== Guests ==
=== Indonesians ===
Notable Indonesians attended the inauguration include: outgoing President Joko Widodo and Vice President Ma'ruf Amin; Speaker of the People's Consultative Assembly, Ahmad Muzani; Chief Justice of the Constitutional Court, Suhartoyo; Chairman of the General Elections Commission, Mochammad Afifuddin; former president Susilo Bambang Yudhoyono; as well as former vice presidents Jusuf Kalla, Boediono, and Try Sutrisno; former 2024 presidential and vice-presidential candidates Anies Baswedan–Muhaimin Iskandar. The list of attendees are as follows:

- Titiek Suharto, ex-wife of Prabowo Subianto and member of House of Representatives
- Didit Hediprasetyo, son of Prabowo Subianto
- Selvi Ananda, incoming Second Lady of Indonesia
- Iriana, outgoing First Lady of Indonesia, wife of President Joko Widodo
- Wury Estu Handayani, outgoing Second Lady of Indonesia, wife of Vice President Ma'ruf Amin
- Susilo Bambang Yudhoyono, 6th President of Indonesia (2004–2014)
- Try Sutrisno, 6th Vice President of Indonesia (1993–1998)
- Jusuf Kalla, 10th and 12th Vice President of Indonesia (2004–2009, 2014–2019)
- Boediono, 11th Vice President of Indonesia (2009–2014)
- Ahmad Muzani, Speaker of the People's Consultative Assembly
- Puan Maharani, Speaker of the House of Representatives
- Amien Rais, former Speaker of the People's Consultative Assembly (1999–2004)
- Listyo Sigit Prabowo, Chief of the Indonesian National Police
- Suhartoyo, Chief Justice of the Constitutional Court of Indonesia
- Mochammad Afifuddin, Head of the General Elections Commission
- Anies Baswedan, losing presidential nominee of the 2024 Indonesian general election
  - Muhaimin Iskandar, losing vice presidential nominee of the 2024 Indonesian general election
- Nasaruddin Umar, Grand Imam of Istiqlal Mosque

=== Foreign dignitaries ===
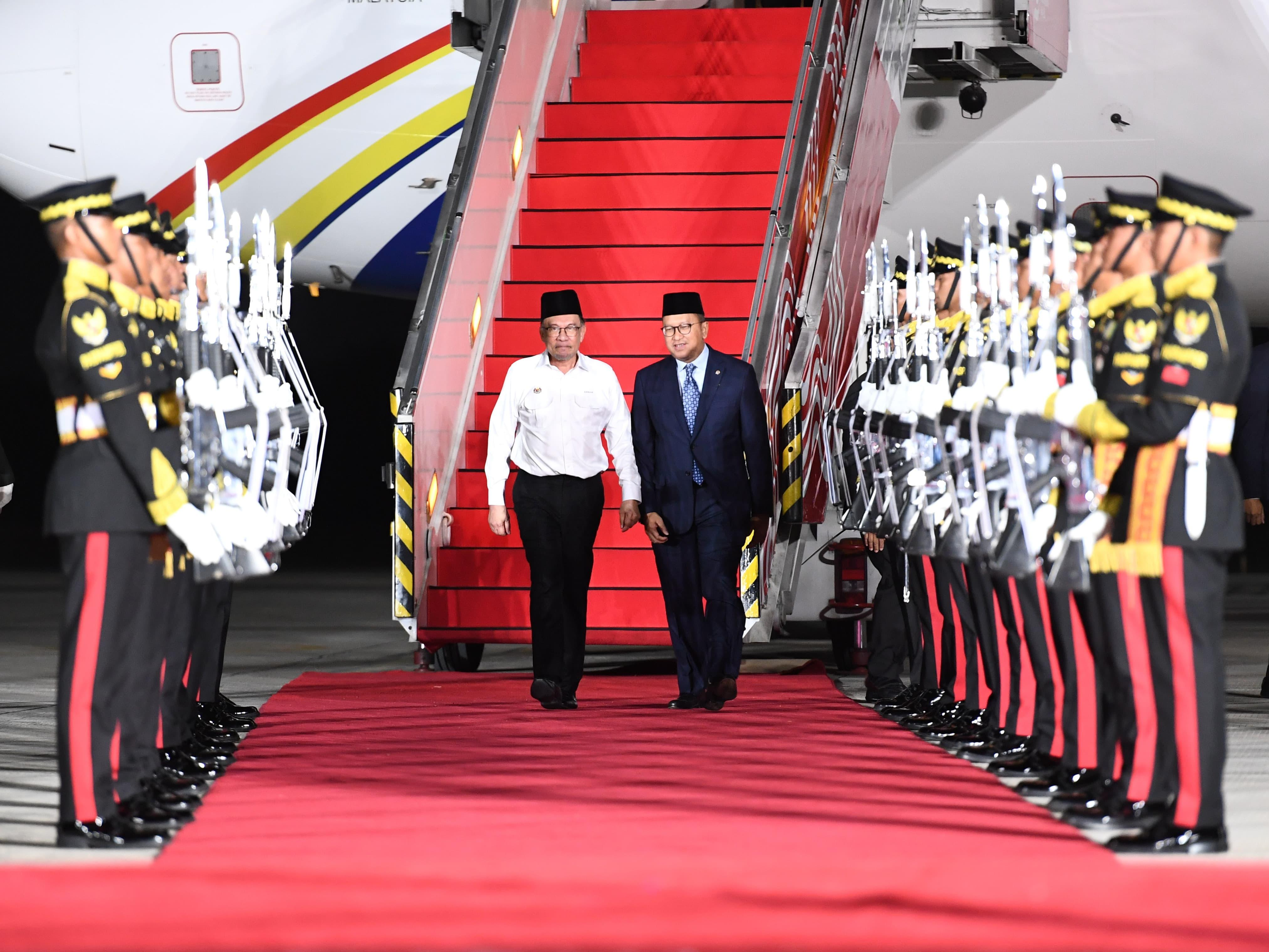
Malaysian Prime Minister Anwar Ibrahim arriving at Halim Perdanakusuma Airport on Saturday evening

Apart from ambassadors, heads of missions, and dignitaries of diplomatic corps based in Jakarta, attending heads of states and governments, envoys, and other representatives in the inauguration include:

==== Royals ====
- Brunei: Sultan and Prime Minister Hassanal Bolkiah

==== Presidents and prime ministers ====
- Cambodia: Prime Minister Hun Manet
- Malaysia: Prime Minister Anwar Ibrahim
  - Chief Minister of Sabah Hajiji Noor
- Papua New Guinea: Prime Minister James Marape
- Philippines: President Bongbong Marcos
- Serbia: Prime Minister Miloš Vučević
- Singapore: Prime Minister Lawrence Wong
- Solomon Islands: Prime Minister Jeremiah Manele
- South Korea: Prime Minister Han Duck-soo
- Timor-Leste: Prime Minister Xanana Gusmão
- Vanuatu: Prime Minister Charlot Salwai

==== Vice presidents, deputy prime ministers, and ministers ====
- Australia: Deputy Prime Minister Richard Marles
- China: Vice President Han Zheng
- Egypt: Awqaf Minister Usama Al-Sayyid Al-Azhari
- India: Minister of State for External Affairs Pabitra Margherita
- Italy: Deputy Defense Minister Matteo Perego di Cremnago
- Jordan: Minister of State for Foreign Affairs Nancy Namrouqa
- Laos: Vice President Pany Yathotou
- New Zealand: Deputy Prime Minister and Foreign Minister Winston Peters
- Qatar: Deputy Prime Minister Khalid bin Mohammad Al Attiyah
- Russia: First Deputy Prime Minister Denis Manturov
  - Senator of the Russian Federation Ilyas Umakhanov
- Saudi Arabia: Minister of State for Foreign Affairs Adel al-Jubeir
- Thailand: Deputy Prime Minister Suriya Juangroongruangkit
- Turkey: Defense Minister Yaşar Güler
- United Arab Emirates: Tolerance Minister of State Nahyan bin Mubarak Al Nahyan
- United Kingdom: Foreign Secretary David Lammy
- Vietnam: Vice President Võ Thị Ánh Xuân

==== Envoys and other representatives ====
- Canada: Special envoy for Indo-Pacific Ian McKay
- France: Personal envoy of French President François Corbin
- Germany: Former Federal President Christian Wulff
- Japan: Special envoy of Emperor Naruhito and former Foreign Minister Masahiko Komura
- United States:
  - Linda Thomas-Greenfield, United States Ambassador to the United Nations
  - Don Graves, United States Deputy Secretary of Commerce
  - Admiral Samuel Paparo, Commander of United States Indo-Pacific Command
  - Daniel Kritenbrink, Assistant Secretary of State for East Asian and Pacific Affairs
  - Mira Rapp-Hooper, Special Assistant to the President and Senior Director for East Asia and Oceania

== Official portraits ==
Official portraits of the president and vice president.

On 20 October 2024, the government released the official presidential and vice-presidential portraits of Prabowo and Gibran through the Ministry of the State Secretariat. The portraits are available to be downloaded for free, and can be printed and displayed in government buildings, offices, schools, and public spaces as symbols of the nation's leadership.

== See also ==
- 2024 Indonesian presidential election
- Prabowo Subianto 2024 presidential campaign
