= Diaz Hendropriyono =

Indonesian politician

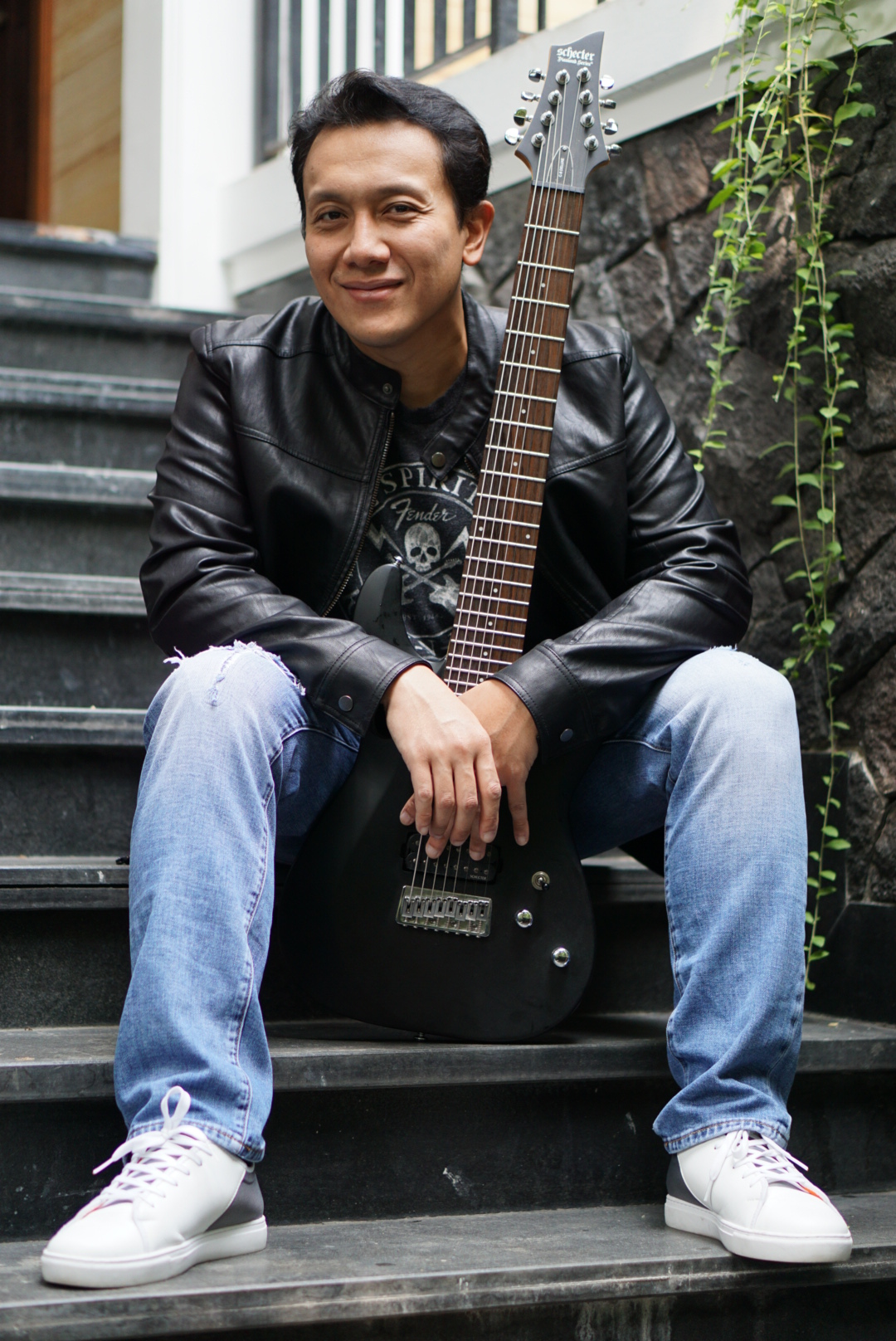

Deputy Minister of Environment of Indonesia
- Incumbent
- Assumed office 21 October 2024
- President: Prabowo Subianto
- Preceded by: Alue Dohong

Leader of the Indonesian Justice and Unity Party
- In office 19 May 2018 – 10 May 2021
- Preceded by: A. M. Hendropiyono
- Succeeded by: Yussuf Solichien

Chairman of the Board of Commissioners Telkomsel
- Incumbent
- Assumed office 30 May 2025
- Preceded by: Wishnutama

Special Staff to the President of Indonesia
- In office 2014–2019
- Preceded by: Staff established
- Succeeded by: Ayu Kartika Dewi

Personal details
- Born: Diaz Faisal Malik Hendropriyono; 25 September 1978 (age 48) Jakarta, Indonesia
- Party: PKPI
- Spouse: Linda Ratna Nirmala
- Relations: Andika Perkasa (brother-in-law)
- Parent(s): A. M. Hendropriyono (father); Tati Hendropriyono (mother)
- Education: Norwich University (BSc); Virginia Polytechnic Institute and State University (MPA), (PhD); Hawaii Pacific University (MBA), (MA)
- Profession: Politician

Diaz Faisal Malik Hendropriyono (born 25 September 1978) is an Indonesian politician who currently serves as Indonesia's deputy minister of the environment. He served as special staff to the president of Indonesia from 2019 to 2024, and was a chair of the Indonesian Justice and Unity Party in 2018 to 2021. He is the third child of former national intelligence body head A. M. Hendropriyono.

== Education ==
Diaz earned a Bachelor of Science degree from Norwich Military University, United States, in 1999. He subsequently completed two postgraduate programs at Hawaii Pacific University, obtaining a Master of Business Administration and a Master of Arts in Global Leadership in 2003.

In 2010, he received a Master of Public Administration (MPA) degree from Virginia Tech. He later completed the Regular Education Program (PPRA) organized by the National Resilience Institute (Lemhannas) in 2013. In 2026, he received his PhD of Public Administration and Public Affairs from Virginia Tech, with his dissertation, Jema’ah Islamiyah: Explaining the Evolution of the Terrorist Network in Indonesia from 2002 to 2010.

== Career ==
Returning to Indonesia, Diaz began his professional career working for various corporations. He also served as an analyst at a public consulting firm in the United States, led by former U.S. Senator Bennet L. Johnston, from 2004 to 2005. Since 2011, he has been actively involved as director of business development and a member of the Board of Commissioners for various companies, including Telkomsel, Sicepat Ekspres Indonesia, PERTAMINA GAS, PT Tripar Multivision Plus, PT Benua Etam Coal, PT Fit By Beat, and PT Andalusia Andrawina.

In 2012, he was appointed as a member of the Board of Strategic Analysis for the State Intelligence Agency and entered politics in 2014 as special staff to the minister at the Coordinating Ministry for Political, Legal, and Security Affairs of the Republic of Indonesia. In 2016, he was appointed special staff to the president of Indonesia.

Diaz was also a member of the advisory board for the Joko Widodo and Ma’ruf Amin National Political Campaign Team during 2018–2019. Additionally, he served as founder and chairman of Kawan Jokowi (Joko Widodo Youth Coalition) from 2014 to 2016, and co-founder of the Youth Initiative for Democracy and Development of Indonesia in 2009–2010.
