= Sutiyoso =

Indonesian politician and former general (born 1944)

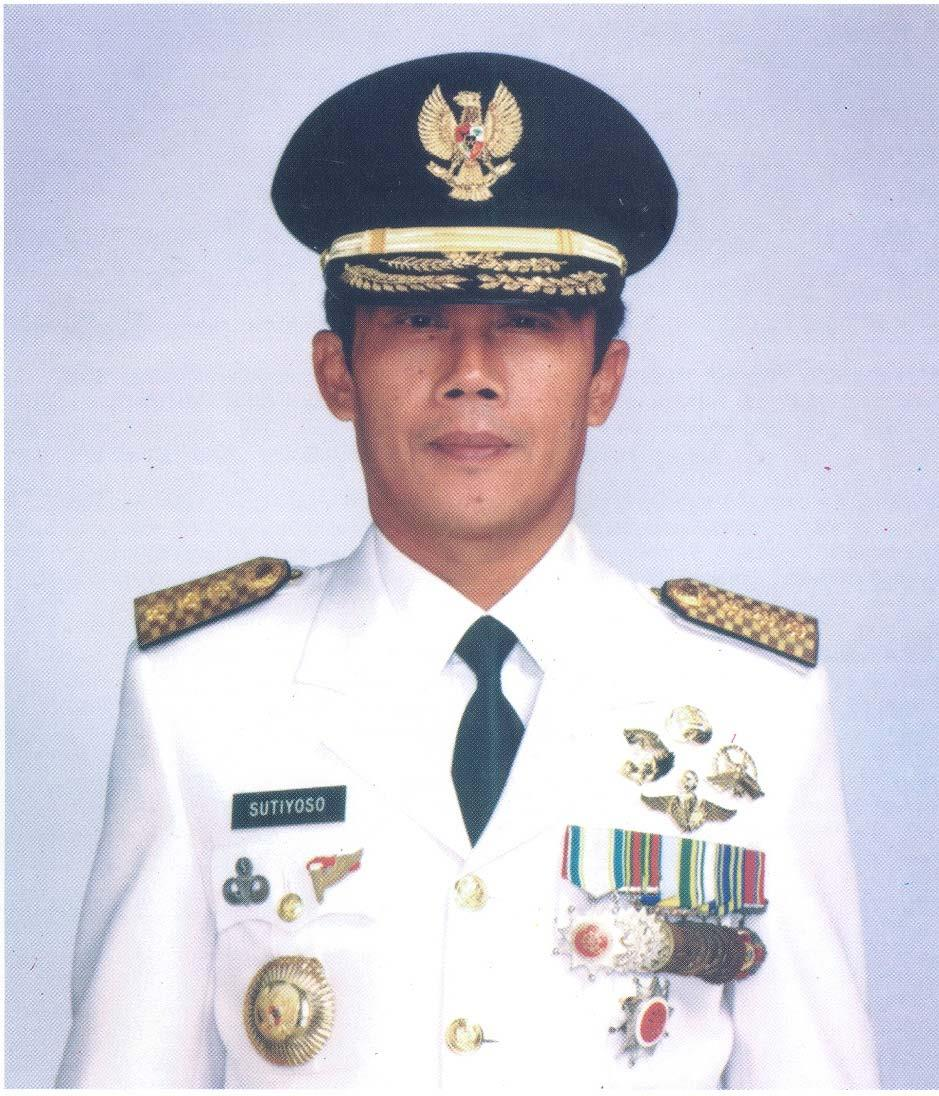
- Official portrait as governor, 1997

15th Director of State Intelligence Agency
- In office 8 July 2015 – 9 September 2016
- President: Joko Widodo
- Preceded by: Marciano Norman
- Succeeded by: Budi Gunawan

9th Governor of Jakarta
- In office 6 October 1997 – 7 October 2007
- Vice Governor: Fauzi Bowo (2002–2007)
- Preceded by: Soerjadi Soedirdja
- Succeeded by: Fauzi Bowo

13th Commander of Kodam Jayakarta
- In office 1996–1997
- President: Suharto
- Preceded by: Maj. Gen. Wiranto
- Succeeded by: Maj. Gen. Sjafrie Sjamsoeddin

Personal details
- Born: 6 December 1944 (age 81) Semarang, Japanese-occupied East Indies
- Party: NasDem
- Other political affiliations: PKPI (2010–2015)
- Spouse: Setyorini (m. 1974)
- Education: Indonesian Military Academy
- Occupation: Army officer; politician
- Nickname: Bang Yos

Military service
- Allegiance: Indonesia
- Branch/service: Indonesian Army
- Years of service: 1968–1997
- Rank: Lieutenant general
- Unit: Kopassus (Special Forces)
- Commands: Kopassus
- Battles/wars: Communist insurgency in Borneo; Operation Flamboyan; Operation Lotus; Insurgency in Aceh

Sutiyoso (born 6 December 1944), nicknamed Bang Yos, is an Indonesian politician and former general. He was Head of the State Intelligence Agency from 2015 to 2016, and was previously Governor of Jakarta from 1997 to 2007.

Born in Semarang, Sutiyoso dropped out of university to join the Indonesian Military Academy and graduated in 1968. He joined the Kopassus special forces unit as a military intelligence officer, seeing action in Kalimantan against the North Kalimantan Communist Party, East Timor against Falintil, and Aceh against the Free Aceh Movement. He had become deputy commander of the unit by 1988. He then commanded regular military units, becoming Jakarta's military region Kodam Jayakarta's commander by 1996.

Sutiyoso became Governor of Jakarta in October 1997, and the May 1998 riots took place during his first term. He was reelected by the Jakarta DPRD in 2002 for a second term, with the support of the Indonesian Democratic Party of Struggle. Several destructive floods struck Jakarta during his tenure, and to mitigate further flooding, Sutiyoso begun the construction of a flood canal. In 2004, he launched the TransJakarta BRT system as part of a larger uncompleted transport plan, and the service had expanded to seven corridors by the end of his governorship. He also engaged in slum clearance and evictions of informal hawkers. He was involved in a diplomatic incident with Australia in his last year in office.

After his tenure as governor, Sutiyoso made unsuccessful bids to run for president in 2009 and 2014, leading the Indonesian Justice and Unity Party between 2010 and 2015. He was then appointed to lead the State Intelligence Agency in July 2015, but was replaced after a year. Since 2021, he had become a member of the NasDem Party.

== Early life ==
Sutiyoso was born on 6 December 1944 at the village of Pongangan, within Gunungjati district of what is today part of Semarang city. He was the sixth out of eight children of Tjitrodihardjo and Sumini. Tjitrodihardjo was an elementary school principal and Sutiyoso studied at his father's school. He then continued his studies at Semarang city proper. In his autobiography, Sutiyoso wrote how he was a miscreant as a teenager, resulting in his parents sending him to Pontianak in West Kalimantan to live with his older brother Soeparto Tjitrodihardjo. He initially wanted to become a soldier to follow his brother (a student soldier during the Indonesian National Revolution), but due to opposition from his parents, he instead enrolled at the 17 August 1945 University in Surabaya to study civil engineering.

== Military career ==
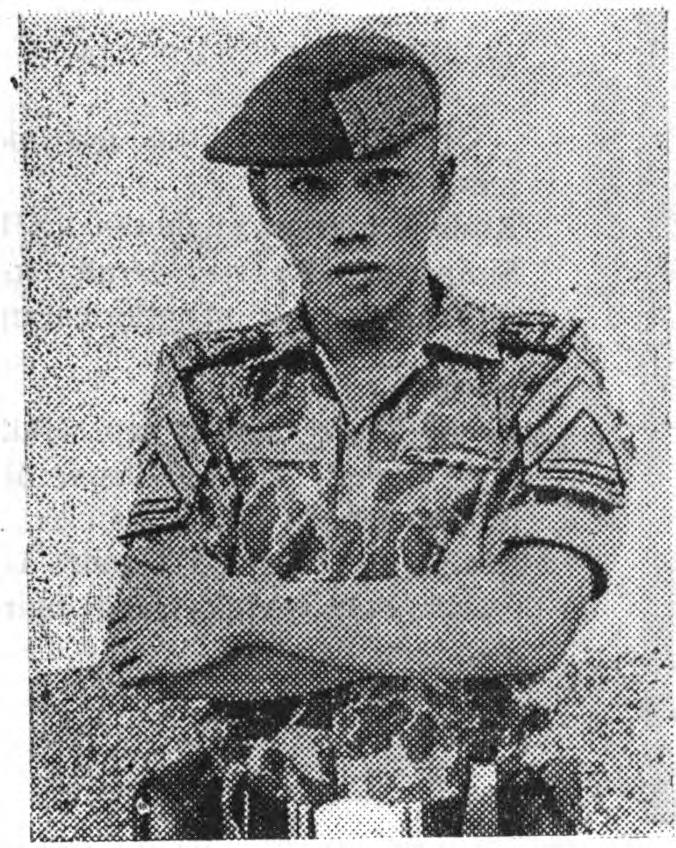
Sutiyoso as an academy graduate, 1968.

After two years at university, Sutiyoso opted to drop out without his parents' knowledge and enrolled at the Indonesian Military Academy in Magelang. He graduated in 1968, and passed the infantry school in 1969, joining the Kopassandha special force. He was deployed in 1969 to Kalimantan to take part in operations against the North Kalimantan Communist Party, a guerilla group previously backed by Indonesia under Sukarno. In the operation, he was a platoon commander for a combat intelligence unit. According to Sutiyoso, his unit did not fire a shot throughout the operation.

In 1975, with the rank of captain and while in the middle of a military intelligence course in Jakarta, Sutiyoso was deployed to Portuguese Timor as part of Operation Flamboyan, a cross-border infiltration in support of the pro-Indonesian Timorese Popular Democratic Association. He led a small unit of commandoes and coordinated an unsuccessful assault on a FRETILIN barracks at the town of Suai before returning to Indonesia. Shortly prior to the full-scale Indonesian invasion in December, Sutiyoso had again infiltrated past the border, and his unit had linked up with a large group of pro-Indonesian partisans at the time of the Battle of Dili (which they did not take part in). Sutiyoso and his unit then took part in an unopposed amphibious operation to capture Baucau, East Timor's second-largest city. After East Timor, Sutiyoso was deployed to Aceh in an intelligence operation against the Free Aceh Movement (GAM). He was tasked with capturing Hasan Tiro, GAM's leader. While he failed to capture Hasan, Sutiyoso successfully led a capture operation of Muhammad Usman Lampoh Awe, GAM's finance minister, in the 1980s.

Sutiyoso later rose within Kopassandha's (renamed to Kopassus) ranks, becoming deputy commander of the unit by 1988. He then became a regimental commander of the Suryakencana regiment, based in Bogor, where he oversaw security measures for the 1994 APEC Conference. In 1994, he was appointed Chief of Staff of Kodam Jaya, Jakarta's military district, and became the district's commander in 1996. On 27 July 1996, an attack occurred on the headquarters of the Indonesian Democratic Party, killing five people. Sutiyoso was accused of leading the attack, and was made a suspect in 2004, but no ruling was made. By 1997, Sutiyoso was a major general, and by the time of his retirement from the armed forces, he had become a lieutenant general.

== Governor of Jakarta ==
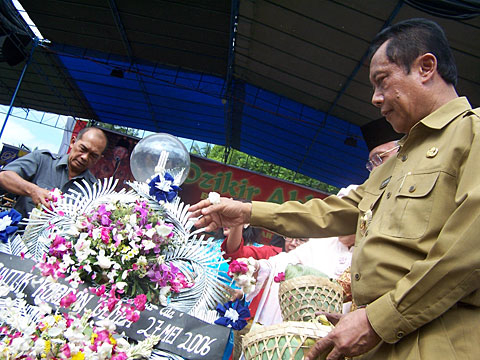
Sutiyoso at the Yogyakarta earthquake's one-year commemoration, 2007.

On 6 October 1997, Sutiyoso was appointed as the Governor of Jakarta, replacing Soerjadi Soedirdja. In the Jakarta Regional House of Representatives vote, he defeated Soedirdja's deputy M. Rais and House of Representatives member from Golkar Ahmadi. The move from his residence as Kodam Jaya's commander to the governor's house involved a Betawi parade, with Sutiyoso riding on an andong cart while being escorted by Rano Karno, then an actor famous for his role in Si Doel. Rano also recommended Sutiyoso take on the nickname "Bang Yos".

The May 1998 riots heavily impacted Jakarta during Sutiyoso's tenure. The security forces' response to the rioters involved Sutiyoso, along with military leaders such as Sjafrie Sjamsoeddin (his successor at Kodam Jaya) and Prabowo Subianto (head of Kostrad). Sutiyoso along with the others would later be investigated for kidnappings of activists during the period. In August that year, following rumours of another upcoming riot, Sutiyoso urged residents to prepare by arming themselves. Sutiyoso in 2002 would warn the Chinese Indonesian community in Jakarta, who had been targeted by the 1998 rioters, to celebrate Chinese New Year in a "low-key" way.

His first term expired on 6 October 2002, and Sutiyoso secured the support of President Megawati Sukarnoputri with her party the Indonesian Democratic Party of Struggle along with Vice President Hamzah Haz of the United Development Party to run for a second term. Due to Sutiyoso's alleged involvement in the 1996 incident, Megawati's decision was controversial among members of PDI-P's Jakarta branch. Many PDI-P members instead supported Tarmidi Suhardjo, the provincial chairman, who would also run for governor and would later be dismissed from party leadership. 72 people registered to run for Jakarta's governor in 2002, with eight pairs eventually being voted on by the Jakarta Regional House of Representatives. The legislature elected Sutiyoso for a second term, with provincial secretary Fauzi Bowo being selected as his deputy with 47 out of 84 votes. Sutiyoso was sworn in for his second term on 7 October 2002.

=== Flooding ===
Jakarta was impacted by heavy flooding during Sutiyoso's term as governor, with particularly damaging ones in 2002, 2004, and 2007. After the 2002 flood which killed 32 people, Sutiyoso sent a request to the government of neighboring Bogor Regency to demolish a number of villas which blocked water infiltration in the Puncak area. Among the villas demolished was a 200-square meter villa belonging to Sutiyoso. The 2007 flood had an even larger impact, affecting 60 percent of the city and killing 48 people in Jakarta. Sutiyoso was heavily criticized for his handling of the floods.

Despite financial difficulties experienced by the provincial government due to the Asian financial crisis, Sutiyoso engaged in a relocation program for illegal squatter housing on the banks of the Ciliwung River, and begun the construction of the East Flood Canal to complement the Dutch-era West Canal. Dredging efforts were however constrained by lack of funding, and relocated residents soon returned to their squatter homes due to a lack of replacement homes.

=== Transport ===
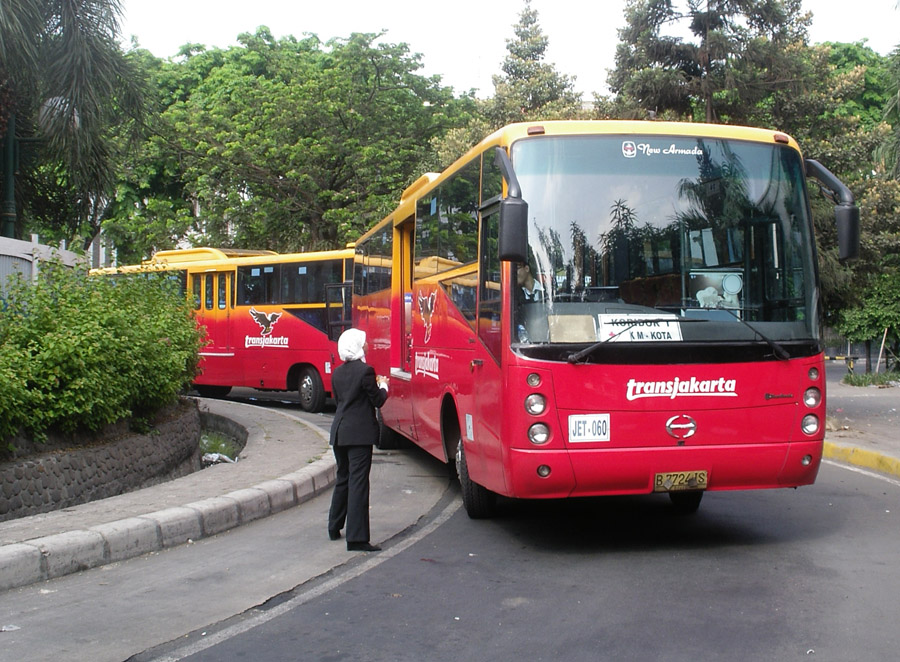
TransJakarta buses, 2006.

In his first term, Sutiyoso stated that he would reallow cycle rickshaws (becak) to operate again in Jakarta, contrary to a 1988 ban, citing the need to create jobs due to the ongoing economic crisis. However, as the becak quickly filled up Jakarta's streets, Sutiyoso reversed his decision and re-enforced the ban within several days, resulting in raids and arrests of the becak drivers. Becak drivers would protest the ban throughout the rest of Sutiyoso's first term.

To reduce congestion, Sutiyoso implemented a "three in one" policy on 23 December 2003, which required private cars passing through certain roads to be occupied by at least 3 people. The policy, however, resulted in the emergence of "jockeys": passengers paid by car owners to allow them to pass through restricted roads, often including children. In one incident, a municipal police attempt to crack down on the jockeys in 2007 resulted in the death of a 15-year old. The policy would eventually be abolished in 2016. He also increased Jakarta's motor vehicle tax in 2001, initially by 80 percent, but the increase was revised following public resistance.

For public transit, Sutiyoso launched the TransJakarta bus rapid transit system in 2004, inspired by TransMilenio in Bogotá. This was part of a master plan which would also develop monorail and subway systems. However, only TransJakarta would commence operations by the end of his tenure, with the monorail cancelled in 2015 and the subway opening in 2019. TransJakarta's launch date was initially planned in 2002, but due to funding problems, was delayed to 2004. Its initial launch saw complaints from other road users as it took up a segregated lane, with further protests by share taxi and other bus drivers. Sutiyoso pressed on with the project, and by early 2007 TransJakarta had seven corridors, carrying 74.5 million passengers in 2004–2006. He also launched a "waterway" water taxi service in 2007, but it did not catch on and his successor Fauzi Bowo cancelled it in January 2008.

=== Evictions and other policies ===
Between 2001 and 2005, Jakarta's government under Sutiyoso conducted at least 86 demolitions of poor neighborhoods/slums, impacting around 75 thousand residents. According to Sutiyoso, most of the evicted residents were squatters and officially not Jakarta residents. When Housing Minister Soenarno began permitting the construction of dwellings under bridges in Jakarta in 2003, Sutiyoso criticized him. In 2002, in order to improve the quality of the National Monument in Jakarta, Sutiyoso ordered the construction of a 4-kilometer long 2.75 metres (9.0 ft) high fence. This was intended to reduce the number of informal hawkers and protesters entering the grounds and damaging the monument's lawn area. About 3,000 street hawkers were evicted from the lawn grounds in the process.

Sutiyoso also issued bylaws prohibiting smoking in public areas (2005) and banning poultry farming in residences within city limits (2007). Under Sutiyoso, the provincial government also constructed small parks, around 500 square meters each, in densely populated slum areas, with 54 being constructed between 2001 and 2004.

=== Sydney incident ===
In May 2007, Sutiyoso visited Sydney, Australia, related to Jakarta's sister city relationship with New South Wales. On 29 May, while Sutiyoso was in his hotel room, NSW Police officers entered his room using a duplicate key, before knocking on his room door to deliver an invitation for Sutiyoso to attend a court session to testify on the Balibo Five case – five Australian journalists killed during Indonesia's invasion of East Timor. (Note: According to Sutiyoso's account, while he was in East Timor at the time of the incident, he was not at the town of Balibo where the deaths happened.) Sutiyoso cut short his official visit, and returned to Jakarta the following day. He also filed a formal complaint to the Government of New South Wales. A protest of several hundred broke out on 30 May in front of the Australian Embassy in Jakarta following the incident. The Indonesian government came in support of Sutiyoso, with presidential spokesperson Dino Patti Djalal asserting that the incident amounted to an invasion of privacy, demanding an apology. Sutiyoso would receive formal apologies from New South Wales Premier Morris Iemma and Australian ambassador Bill Farmer within the next two days.

== Post-governorship ==
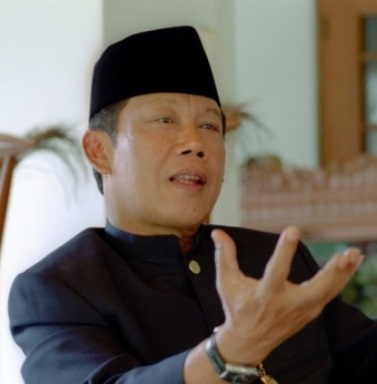
Sutiyoso in 2015.

After the end of his tenure as governor, Sutiyoso sought to run in the 2009 presidential election, either as a presidential or vice-presidential candidate. He secured the endorsement of the Prosperous Indonesia Party, but ultimately did not run and instead endorsed Jusuf Kalla and Wiranto. In 2010, Sutiyoso was elected as the Chairman of the Indonesian Justice and Unity Party (PKPI). PKPI initially endorsed Sutiyoso to run in the 2014 presidential election, before Sutiyoso and PKPI ultimately endorsed Joko Widodo. In the legislative election, PKPI won 0.97 percent of votes, the lowest of all participating parties. On 8 July 2015, Sutiyoso was sworn in as Head of the State Intelligence Agency (BIN) replacing Marciano Norman. Due to the appointment, he resigned his PKPI chairmanship on 6 July.

As BIN Head, Sutiyoso in January 2016 announced that the organization would take a "persuasive" approach to insurgency movements in Papua and Poso. Sutiyoso had previously managed to personally persuade Din Minimi, leader of an armed group in Aceh, to surrender. After the 2016 Jakarta attacks, Sutiyoso claimed that BIN had sent warnings of the attack to police forces as early as November 2015. He also requested that BIN be given additional powers – namely, the right to arrest suspects. He was replaced as BIN head by former deputy chief of police Budi Gunawan on 9 September 2016. After his BIN term, he remarked that he had no plans to reenter politics.

In 2021, Sutiyoso joined the NasDem Party and became a member of its advisory council. He also was commissioner at the Jakartan provincial government-owned property firm Pembangunan Jaya Ancol between August 2022 and his resignation in October 2023. For the 2024 Indonesian presidential election, Sutiyoso joined the presidential campaign team of Anies Baswedan. The three pairs of candidates for the 2024 Jakarta gubernatorial election visited him throughout their campaign, although Sutiyoso did not give any public endorsements (Sutiyoso, being a resident of Bekasi by 2024, was ineligible to vote in the election). In 2025, he endorsed calls for Gibran Rakabuming Raka's removal as the Vice President of Indonesia.

== Personal life ==
Sutiyoso married Setyorini in 1974, and the couple has two daughters. His home is in Bekasi, built in 1997 and located on a 3-hectare plot of land. A "Bang Yos Museum", dedicated to Sutiyoso's career, is located at his home's backyard, and was inaugurated in 2020 by Wiranto.

He was chairman of the Indonesian Shooting Association between 1997 and 2001, and then of the Indonesian Basketball Association until 2004. Between 2004 and 2008, Sutiyoso also served as Chairman of the Badminton Association of Indonesia. Sutiyoso claimed that, throughout his badminton chairmanship, he had spent Rp 50 billion (~USD 5 million) of his own money to sponsor training camps, especially in preparation for the 2008 Beijing Olympics.

== Notes ==
Political offices
Preceded by Soerjadi Soedirdja	Governor of Jakarta; 1997–2007	Succeeded by Fauzi Bowo
Military offices
Preceded by Wiranto	Commander of the Jayakarta Military Command; 1996–1997	Succeeded by Sjafrie Sjamsoeddin
Sporting positions
Preceded by Chairul Tanjung	Chairman of the Badminton Association of Indonesia; 2004–2008	Succeeded by Djoko Santoso
Party political offices
Preceded by Meutia Hatta	Chairman of the Indonesian Justice and Unity Party; 2010–2015	Succeeded by Isran Noor
Government offices
Preceded by Marciano Norman	Director of the State Intelligence Agency; 2015–2016	Succeeded by Budi Gunawan
