= Results of the 2014 Indonesian legislative election =

A legislative election was held on 9 April 2014 in Indonesia to renew the mandate of the national and regional legislatures which expired that year. Official results were announced on 9 May 2014, with the DPR seat allocation being announced separately on 14 May. This is the fourth free and democratic legislative election since the Fall of Suharto in 1998.

== List of political parties ==
Bold indicates parties that passed the electoral threshold

- **Nasdem Party** (Nasdem)
- **National Awakening Party** (PKB)
- **Prosperous Justice Party** (PKS)
- **Indonesian Democratic Party of Struggle** (PDI-P)
- **Party of the Functional Groups** (Golkar)
- **Great Indonesia Movement Party** (Gerindra)
- **Democratic Party** (Demokrat)
- **National Mandate Party** (PAN)
- **United Development Party** (PPP)
- **People's Conscience Party** (Hanura)
- Crescent Star Party (PBB)
- Indonesian Justice and Unity Party (PKPI)

== Parliamentary results ==

Party	Votes	%	+/–	Seats	+/–
Indonesian Democratic Party of Struggle	23,681,233	18.95	+4.92	109	+15
Golkar	18,432,216	14.75	+0.30	91	–15
Gerindra Party	14,760,090	11.81	+7.35	73	+47
Democratic Party	12,728,950	10.18	–10.66	61	–87
National Awakening Party	11,299,017	9.04	+4.10	47	+19
National Mandate Party	9,481,395	7.59	+1.58	49	+3
Prosperous Justice Party	8,480,158	6.79	–1.09	40	–17
NasDem Party	8,402,894	6.72	New	35	New
United Development Party	8,157,522	6.53	+1.21	39	+1
People's Conscience Party	6,590,804	5.27	+1.49	16	–1
Crescent Star Party	1,826,057	1.46	–0.33	0	0
Indonesian Justice and Unity Party	1,143,138	0.91	+0.01	0	0
**Total**	**124,983,474**	**100.00**	–	**560**	**0**
Valid votes	124,983,474	89.26			
Invalid/blank votes	15,033,341	10.74			
Total votes	**140,016,815**	**100.00**			
Registered voters/turnout	187,866,698	74.53			
Source: KPU Buku Data & Infografik Pemilu Anggota DPR RI & DPD RI 2014 pp27,31-32

=== Results by province ===
==== Aceh (13) ====
**2**	**1**	**1**	**1**	**2**	**2**	**2**	**1**	**1**
**Nasdem**	**PKB**	**PKS**	**PDI-P**	**Golkar**	**Gerindra**	**PD**	**PAN**	**PPP**

==== North Sumatra (30) ====
**3**	**1**	**3**	**4**	**4**	**4**	**3**	**3**	**2**	**3**
**Nasdem**	**PKB**	**PKS**	**PDI-P**	**Golkar**	**Gerindra**	**PD**	**PAN**	**PPP**	**Hanura**

==== West Sumatra (14) ====
**1**	**2**	**2**	**2**	**2**	**2**	**1**	**2**
**Nasdem**	**PKS**	**PDI-P**	**Golkar**	**Gerindra**	**PD**	**PAN**	**PPP**

==== Riau (11) ====
**1**	**1**	**2**	**2**	**2**	**2**	**1**
**PKB**	**PKS**	**PDI-P**	**Golkar**	**Gerindra**	**PD**	**PAN**

==== Jambi (7) ====
**1**	**1**	**1**	**1**	**1**	**1**	**1**
**PKB**	**PDI-P**	**Golkar**	**Gerindra**	**PD**	**PAN**	**PPP**

==== South Sumatra (17) ====
**1**	**1**	**2**	**3**	**3**	**2**	**2**	**2**	**1**
**Nasdem**	**PKB**	**PKS**	**PDI-P**	**Golkar**	**Gerindra**	**PD**	**PAN**	**Hanura**

==== Bengkulu (4) ====
**1**	**1**	**1**	**1**
**Nasdem**	**PDI-P**	**Gerindra**	**PAN**

==== Lampung (18) ====
**1**	**2**	**2**	**4**	**2**	**2**	**2**	**2**	**1**
**Nasdem**	**PKB**	**PKS**	**PDI-P**	**Golkar**	**Gerindra**	**PD**	**PAN**	**Hanura**

==== Bangka Belitung (3) ====
**1**	**1**	**1**
**PDI-P**	**Golkar**	**PD**

==== Riau Islands (3) ====
**1**	**1**	**1**
**Nasdem**	**PDI-P**	**PAN**

==== Jakarta (21) ====
**1**	**3**	**6**	**3**	**3**	**2**	**3**
**Nasdem**	**PKS**	**PDI-P**	**Golkar**	**Gerindra**	**PD**	**PPP**

==== West Java (91) ====
**1**	**7**	**11**	**18**	**17**	**10**	**9**	**7**	**7**	**4**
**Nasdem**	**PKB**	**PKS**	**PDI-P**	**Golkar**	**Gerindra**	**PD**	**PAN**	**PPP**	**Hanura**

==== Central Java (77) ====
**5**	**10**	**4**	**18**	**11**	**10**	**4**	**8**	**7**
**Nasdem**	**PKB**	**PKS**	**PDI-P**	**Golkar**	**Gerindra**	**PD**	**PAN**	**PPP**

==== Yogyakarta (8) ====
**1**	**1**	**2**	**1**	**1**	**1**	**1**
**PKB**	**PKS**	**PDI-P**	**Golkar**	**Gerindra**	**PD**	**PAN**

==== East Java (87) ====
**7**	**15**	**2**	**17**	**11**	**11**	**11**	**7**	**4**	**2**
**Nasdem**	**PKB**	**PKS**	**PDI-P**	**Golkar**	**Gerindra**	**PD**	**PAN**	**PPP**	**Hanura**

==== Banten (22) ====
**1**	**1**	**2**	**4**	**3**	**3**	**2**	**2**	**3**	**1**
**Nasdem**	**PKB**	**PKS**	**PDI-P**	**Golkar**	**Gerindra**	**PD**	**PAN**	**PPP**	**Hanura**

==== Bali (9) ====
**4**	**2**	**1**	**2**
**PDI-P**	**Golkar**	**Gerindra**	**PD**

==== West Nusa Tenggara (10) ====
**1**	**1**	**1**	**1**	**1**	**1**	**1**	**1**	**1**	**1**
**Nasdem**	**PKB**	**PKS**	**PDI-P**	**Golkar**	**Gerindra**	**PD**	**PAN**	**PPP**	**Hanura**

==== East Nusa Tenggara (13) ====
**2**	**2**	**3**	**2**	**2**	**1**	**1**
**Nasdem**	**PDI-P**	**Golkar**	**Gerindra**	**PD**	**PAN**	**Hanura**

==== West Kalimantan (10) ====
**1**	**1**	**3**	**1**	**1**	**1**	**1**	**1**
**Nasdem**	**PKB**	**PDI-P**	**Golkar**	**Gerindra**	**PD**	**PAN**	**PPP**

==== Central Kalimantan (6) ====
**1**	**2**	**1**	**1**	**1**
**Nasdem**	**PDI-P**	**Golkar**	**Gerindra**	**PAN**

==== South Kalimantan (11) ====
**2**	**1**	**1**	**3**	**2**	**2**
**PKB**	**PKS**	**PDI-P**	**Golkar**	**Gerindra**	**PPP**

==== East Kalimantan (8) ====
**1**	**1**	**1**	**2**	**1**	**1**	**1**
**Nasdem**	**PKS**	**PDI-P**	**Golkar**	**Gerindra**	**PD**	**PPP**

==== North Sulawesi (6) ====
**2**	**1**	**1**	**1**	**1**
**PDI-P**	**Golkar**	**Gerindra**	**PD**	**PAN**

==== Central Sulawesi (6) ====
**1**	**1**	**1**	**1**	**1**	**1**
**Nasdem**	**PDI-P**	**Golkar**	**Gerindra**	**PD**	**Hanura**

==== South Sulawesi (24) ====
**2**	**2**	**2**	**5**	**3**	**3**	**3**	**3**	**1**
**Nasdem**	**PKS**	**PDI-P**	**Golkar**	**Gerindra**	**PD**	**PAN**	**PPP**	**Hanura**

==== Southeast Sulawesi (5) ====
**1**	**1**	**1**	**1**	**1**
**Golkar**	**Gerindra**	**PD**	**PAN**	**PPP**

==== Gorontalo (3) ====
**2**	**1**
**Golkar**	**Gerindra**

==== West Sulawesi (3) ====
**1**	**1**	**1**
**Golkar**	**Gerindra**	**PD**

==== Maluku (4) ====
**1**	**1**	**1**	**1**
**PKB**	**PDI-P**	**Golkar**	**Gerindra**

==== North Maluku (3) ====
**1**	**1**	**1**
**PDI-P**	**Golkar**	**PAN**

==== Papua (10) ====
**1**	**1**	**1**	**2**	**1**	**1**	**2**	**1**
**Nasdem**	**PKB**	**PKS**	**PDI-P**	**Golkar**	**Gerindra**	**PD**	**PAN**

==== West Papua (3) ====
**1**	**1**	**1**
**PDI-P**	**Golkar**	**PD**
