= Talangsari incident =

Event in Indonesia 1989

- Date: 7 February 1989
- Location: Talangsari, East Lampung, Lampung, Indonesia
- Result: See Aftermath

Parties
Republic of Indonesia Armed Forces; Indonesian Army; National Police; Brimob	Islamist groups

Lead figures
Col. Hendropriyono	Warsidi †

Casualties and losses
3 killed (Note: At least two of the deaths were prior to the incident.)	27–130 killed 300 killed

The Talangsari incident (Indonesian: Peristiwa Talangsari) was an incident that occurred in the village of Talangsari, Lampung, Indonesia in 1989, where Islamist civilians were massacred by Indonesian Army troops. The civilians had formed an Islamist commune, which developed tensions with local residents and authorities.

== Background ==
In late 1988 and early 1989, an Islamist group calling themselves the Jama'ah Mujahiddin Fisabilillah established a commune in the transmigrant hamlet of Talangsari III, in Lampung, where they had established themselves under Warsidi, a local quran teacher. Before long, tensions developed between the residents of the hamlet and the Islamists, resulting in some of the locals fleeing due to perceived threats. The issue was brought up to higher local authorities, who after a meeting with the commune passed it on to the local military garrison commander, Captain Soetiman. Following an initial arrest of several of the commune's members, Soetiman led a group of soldiers and officers to the commune on 6 February, where they were ambushed and Soetiman was killed. Some members of the commune later attempted to disperse across Lampung, killing another soldier whom they met by chance in the process that day.

== Incident ==
A military detachment consisting of three platoons from the Indonesian Army and a platoon of the Mobile Brigade Corps under then-colonel Hendropriyono was dispatched to the village. According to Hendropriyono's accounts, yet another soldier and a civilian had been killed by the group, in addition to another soldier being seriously injured.

According to reports from the human rights organization KontraS, the soldiers - who were equipped with napalm bombs and helicopters - did not give any warnings before storming the village, and forced a young member of the commune to set fire to some of the huts with many still trapped inside. Survivors were then imprisoned. Hendropriyono's account of the situation claimed that some members of the commune had deliberately set fire to the huts and prevented civilians from escaping.

=== Casualties ===
Initial media reporting in the immediate aftermath of the events reported 27 deaths, which KontraS verified in its 2005 investigation, though it also stated that 78 persons were made to "forcefully disappear", in addition to 23 being arrested without cause, 25 being given an unfair trial, and 24 being evicted. Later reporting after the fall of Suharto tended to claim a higher death toll, with the Gatra weekly claiming 246 deaths in 1998. A 2008 inquiry by the National Commission on Human Rights reported that 130 were killed, 50 were detained and tortured, and 77 were evicted.

== Aftermath ==
Two days after the attacks, the dispersed commune members who received news of the incident stormed a military base, injuring several soldiers with six commune members killed. 15 arrested members of the commune were released in 1999, following an amnesty by B.J. Habibie.

Following the inauguration of Joko Widodo in 2014, victims - who claimed to not be members of the commune but were affected by the fighting - called for him to pressure Hendropriyono (who had become the Presidential Adviser) to "reveal the truth about the incident". In February 2019, 30 years after the incident, a "declaration of peace" regarding was held, which involved officials and military officers, alongside current residents of Talangsari. Victims of the incident decried the declaration, claiming that no victims were involved in it.

== Bibliography ==
Wasis, Widjiono (2003). The turmoil at Talangsari: a splinter of the Darul Islam movement. Balai Pustaka. ISBN 978-979-690-029-9.
