= Alue Dohong =

Indonesian politician

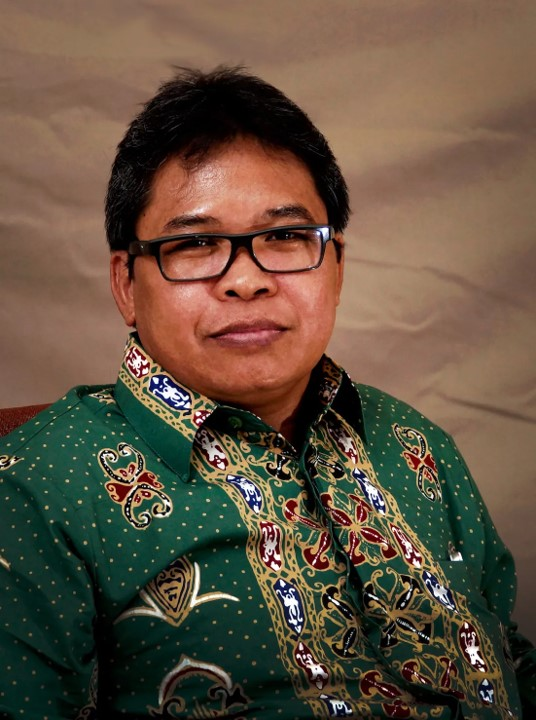
- Alue Dohong (2016)

Deputy Minister of Environment and Forestry
- In office 25 October 2019 – 20 October 2024
- President: Joko Widodo
- Vice President: Ma'ruf Amin
- Succeeded by: Diaz Hendropriyono; Sulaiman Umar Siddiq

Personal details
- Born: 5 October 1966 (age 59) East Kotawaringin Regency, Central Kalimantan, Indonesia

Alue Dohong is an Indonesian politician. He was Deputy Minister of Environment and Forestry from 2019 to 2024. Before appointed as deputy minister, he was a lecturer in University of Palangka Raya. Other than that, he also worked on Peat Land Restoration Agency. He is the first of ethnic Dayak origin that in Deputy Minister in Indonesia . Born in East Kotawaringin Regency, he got bachelor on economy in University of Palangka Raya and continuing to University of Nottingham to get Master of Science and doctor in University of Queensland.

== Indonesian capital city relocation ==
In May 2021, together with several cultural and tribal organizations of Dayak, he organized recording and inventorization of traditional lands of Dayak people in area for new capital of Indonesia in East Kalimantan to minimize future land conflict and save ownership of tribal lands for its tribal owners.
