= Siti Rahmiati Hatta =

First Second Lady of Indonesia from 1945 to 1956

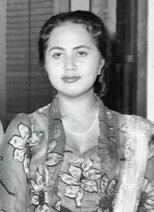
- Siti Rahmiati at the inauguration of the Chairman of the Indonesian Red Cross (1955)

Second Lady of Indonesia
- In role 18 November 1945 – 1 December 1956
- Vice President: Mohammad Hatta
- Preceded by: Position established
- Succeeded by: KRA Pintakapurnama (1973)

Personal details
- Born: Rahmi Rachim; 16 February 1926 Bandung, Dutch East Indies
- Died: 13 April 1999 (aged 73) Jakarta, Indonesia
- Resting place: Tanah Kusir Cemetery
- Spouse: Mohammad Hatta (m. 1945; died 1980)
- Children: 3, including Meutia Hatta
- Awards: Star of Mahaputera, 2nd Class; Star of the Republic of Indonesia

Siti Rahmiati Hatta (16 February 1926 – 13 April 1999) was the wife of the first vice president of Indonesia, Mohammad Hatta. She served as the inaugural Second Lady of Indonesia from 1945 to 1956.

== Early life and education ==
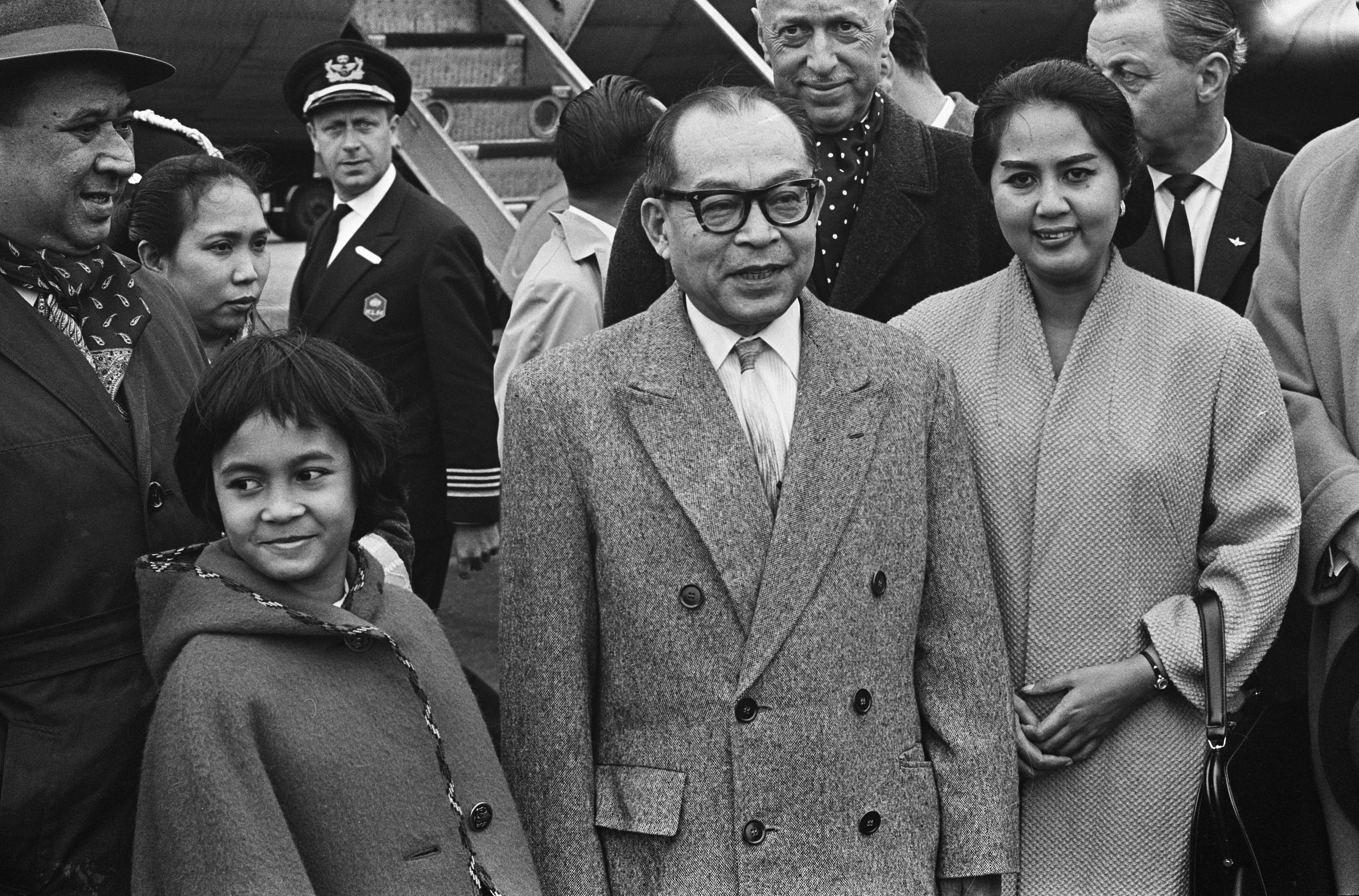
Mohammad Hatta with Rahmi and Meutia at Schiphol Airport, 1963

Siti Rahmiati Hatta, commonly nicknamed "Yuke", was born in Bandung on 16 February 1926. She was the eldest daughter of Abdul Rachim, a Javanese man from Purworejo, and Siti Satiah Annie, a daughter of Tengku Mohammad Nurdin, a government translator of Acehnese descent. Her father was an employee of the Staatsspoorwegen (State Railway) and active in the Indonesian National Scouting movement, while her mother was involved in the women's organization Wanito Sejati. Rahmi was educated at the Europeesche Lagere School (ELS), Het Christelijk Lyceum, and the Meer Uitgebreid Lager Onderwijs (MULO) in Bandung. During the Japanese occupation, she worked at the Instituut Pasteur in Bandung. He has a younger sibling named Raharty Subiyakto.

== Marriage ==
Mohammad Hatta first met Rachmi during a visit to the Pasteur Institute, Bandung. Although he was interested in her, Hatta had famously vowed not to marry until Indonesia achieved independence.

Following the Proclamation of Indonesian Independence, Hatta, accompanied by Sukarno, visited Rahmi's home to propose. At the time, Hatta was 43 years old, while Rahmi was 19. They were married on 18 November 1945 in Megamendung, Bogor. As a wedding gift, Hatta gave her a book he had written during his exile in Boven Digoel, titled Alam Pikiran Yunani (Greek Philosophy). The wedding was held simply according to Javanese customs and attended by no more than 30 people.

The couple had three daughters: Meutia Hatta, Gemala Hatta, and Halida Hatta.

== Death ==
Rachmi died on 13 April 1999 at the age of 73. She had been receiving treatment for heart disease at Cipto Mangunkusumo Hospital in Jakarta. According to her family, her health declined rapidly following the death of her sister, Raharty Subiyakto, just a few days prior.

She was buried beside her husband at the Tanah Kusir Cemetery in Jakarta, honoring Hatta's wish to be buried among the common people rather than in the Kalibata Heroes Cemetery.

== Honours ==
- (Indonesia) Star of Mahaputera, 2nd Class (Bintang Mahaputera Adipradana) (14 August 1993)
- Star of the Republic of Indonesia (Bintang Republik Indonesia Adipradana) (posthumously on 13 August 1999)

== Gallery ==
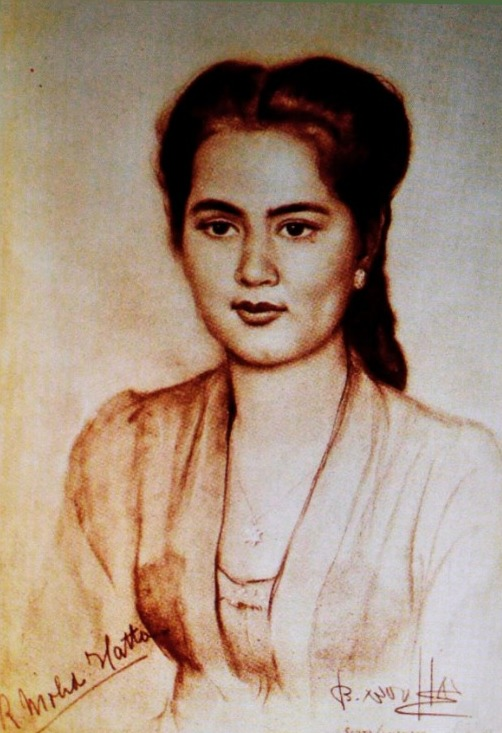
Sketch of Rahmiati Hatta (2020)

Political offices
New office	Second Lady of Indonesia; 1945–1956	Succeeded by KRA Pintakapurnama
