= Tarmidi Suhardjo =

Indonesian politician (1948–2012)

Deputy Speaker of Jakarta DPRD
- In office 1999 – October 2002

Personal details
- Born: 17 March 1948; Brebes, Central Java, Indonesia
- Died: 10 October 2012 (aged 64); Jakarta, Indonesia

Tarmidi Suhardjo (17 March 1948 – 10 October 2012) was an Indonesian politician. He was a member of the Jakarta Regional House of Representatives, elected in 1999, as part of the Indonesian Democratic Party of Struggle (PDIP). He was part of PDIP's provincial leadership until his removal for his opposition to PDIP's endorsement of governor Sutiyoso's 2002 reelection, with Suhardjo running as his competitor. He left PDIP afterwards and unsuccessfully ran for a seat in the national House of Representatives in 2004 and 2009.

== Biography ==
Tarmidi Suhardjo was born on 17 March 1948 in Brebes, Central Java. By the 1980s, he had become a member of the Indonesian Democratic Party (PDI), starting from PDI's local branch at Kebon Pala administrative village in Makasar District, East Jakarta. By 1994, he had become head of the party's East Jakarta branch. During PDI's 1993 internal conflict, Suhardjo was a supporter of Megawati Sukarnoputri. After the fall of Suharto, Suhardjo joined Megawati's new party the Indonesian Democratic Party of Struggle (PDIP). In the 1999 legislative election, Suhardjo ran for and won a seat in the Jakarta Regional House of Representatives, becoming head of PDIP's fraction within the body. He was also a deputy speaker in the body.

When incumbent Jakarta governor Sutiyoso was up for reelection in 2002, PDIP's national leadership endorsed him, while local PDIP politicians in Jakarta was opposed due to Sutiyoso's alleged involvement in the 27 July 1996 incident. Many members instead endorsed Suhardjo as PDIP's candidate, while national party leaders proposed having Suhardjo run for vice governor instead. Suhardjo refused the offer and ran for governor. In the final vote on 11 September, Suhardjo won 13 votes, behind Sutiyoso's 47. In October, Suhardjo was removed from his party leadership roles for defying central party leadership, becoming a regular DPRD member.

After his removal from PDIP leadership, Tarmidi left the party and joined Rachmawati Soekarnoputri's Pioneers' Party. He had become head of the party's Jakarta branch by 2003. He unsuccessfully ran for a seat for Jakarta's 1st district in the national House of Representatives in the 2004 legislative election, winning 1,903 votes. He ran again, also unsuccessfully, in the 2009 legislative election as a National People's Concern Party candidate and won 634 votes. He died on 10 October 2012 and was buried at a public cemetery in East Jakarta on the same day.
