= Karlinah Atmadja =

Indonesian social activist (1930–2025)

Karlinah Djaja Atmadja Wirahadikusumah

4th Second Lady of Indonesia
- In office 11 March 1983 – 11 March 1988
- Vice President: Umar Wirahadikusumah
- Preceded by: Nelly Malik
- Succeeded by: Ratu Emma Norma

Personal details
- Born: Karlinah Djaja Atmadja; 30 July 1930 Bandung, Dutch East Indies
- Died: 6 October 2025 (aged 95) Jakarta, Indonesia
- Resting place: Kalibata Heroes' Cemetery
- Spouse: Umar Wirahadikusumah (m. 1957; died 2003)
- Children: 2
- Parents: Raden Djajaatmadja (father); Nani (mother)

Karlinah Djaja Atmadja Wirahadikusumah (30 July 1930 – 6 October 2025) was an Indonesian social activist. She served as second lady of Indonesia (1983–1988).

== Biography ==
Karlinah was born in Bandung on 30 July 1930 to Raden Djajaatmadja and Nani. She married Umar Wirahadikusumah, who served as the 4th Vice President of Indonesia from 1983 to 1988 on 2 February 1957.

Throughout her life, she was active in various social organizations related to social problems in the community. She was awarded the Satyalancana Kebaktian Sociale award in 1982, and the Star of Mahaputera in 1987.

Karlinah died in Jakarta on 6 October 2025, at the age of 95.

== Bibliography ==
- Karlinah Umar Wirahadikusumah: not just a soldier's wife (2000)
