= Ratu Emma Norma =

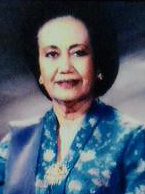

Second Lady of Indonesia
- In role 11 March 1988 – 11 March 1993
- Vice President: Sudharmono
- Preceded by: Karlinah Djaja Atmadja
- Succeeded by: Tuti Sutrisno

Personal details
- Born: 3 March 1927 Purwakarta, Dutch East Indies
- Died: 18 July 2012 (aged 85) Jakarta, Indonesia
- Resting place: Kalibata Heroes' Cemetery
- Spouse: Sudharmono (m. 1951; died 2006)
- Awards: Star of Mahaputera, 2nd Class

Ratu Emma Norma (3 March 1927 – 18 July 2012), also known as Ratu Emma Norma Sudharmono, was the wife of the fifth vice president of Indonesia, Sudharmono. She served as the inaugural Second Lady of Indonesia from 1988 to 1993.

== Early life ==
Ratu Emma Norma was born in Purwakarta on 3 March 1927 the daughter of the couple Tubagus Ilyas Angkawidjaja and Ubaid Djubaedah. She married Sudharmono and was blessed with three children, eight grandchildren, and seven great-grandchildren. He also attended teacher A school and worked in a law office.

== Death ==
Ratu Emma Norma died in Pertamina Central Hospital, Jakarta on Wednesday, 18 July 2012 at the age of 84 after suffering from illness. She was buried the next day on Thursday, 19 July 2012 at the Kalibata Heroes' Cemetery a state military funeral by Vice President Boediono who presided over the ceremony.

== Honours ==
During his lifetime he received honors Star of Mahaputera (Bintang Mahaputera Adipradana), 2nd Class (12 August 1992), Star of the Legion of Veterans of the Republic of Indonesia (Bintang Legiun Veteran Republik Indonesia) (1989), and from several countries such as Kuwait, Cambodia, South Korea, and Venezuela.

Political offices
Preceded by Karlinah Djaja Atmadja	Second Lady of Indonesia; 1988–1993	Succeeded by Tuti Sutrisno
