= Abdul Halim (nationalist) =

Indonesian Islamic scholar and National Hero

Kyai Haji Abdul Halim, known as KH Abdul Halim Majalengka (1887–1962) was an Indonesian Islamic scholar and nationalist figure. He founded a number of Islamic organizations in the Dutch East Indies, including the Hayatul Qulub and the Persyarikatan Ulama and was a member of several national consultative councils during the transition to Indonesian independence in the 1940s. He was declared a National Hero of Indonesia in 2008 by then-president Susilo Bambang Yudhoyono.

== Biography ==
=== Dutch East Indies ===
Abdul Halim was born in the village of Ciborelang in Majalengka Regency, West Java, Dutch East Indies on June 26, 1887. His name at birth was Otong Syatori; his father was Haji Muhammad Iskandar and his mother Haji Siti Mutmainah. Aside from getting Islamic education from his father, he studied in various Pesantren (Islamic boarding schools) in his early years, including the pesantren Bobos in Cirebon, pesantren Ciwedus in Kuningan, and one in Pekalongan. In 1908, he married Siti Murbiyah, daughter of Kyai Haji Muhammad Ilyas.

In 1909 he spent time in Mecca where he was exposed to ideas of Islamic reform being espoused by Rashid Rida, Mohammed 'Abduh, and others. He studied under Ahmad Khatib al-Minangkabawi, an influential Minangkabau Islamic teacher who was then resident in Mecca. During his time there he also befriended other students of his generation, such as Mas Mansoer, who would also later return to the Indies and play an important role in Islamic educational reform.

During the 1910s, after returning to Java, Abdoel Halim founded a number of Islamic organizations, including Madjisul 'Ilmi (1911), Hayatul Qulub (1912) and Persyarikatan Ulama (1916).

=== Japanese occupation and war for Independence ===
During the Japanese occupation of the Dutch East Indies, he was a member of the Central Advisory Council set up by the occupation administration in Java, as well as the Investigating Committee for Preparatory Work for Independence. Of the 62 members of the committee, he was in a group of eleven representing an Islamic faction, which also included Haji Agus Salim, Sukiman, Abdurrahman Baswedan.

In the following year, he was also appointed to the Central Indonesian National Committee, a consultative body set up to advise the president of Indonesia as the country was gaining its independence. During the Indonesian National Revolution in 1946–7, he was also involved in leading guerilla forces against the Dutch in his home region of Majalengka.

=== Independent Indonesia ===
In 1952, Abdul Halim was a founding member of the Persatuan Ummat Islam.

== Legacy ==
Abdul Halim was received Mahaputra Star Class III on 1992 and he was declared a National Hero of Indonesia by president Susilo Bambang Yudhoyono on 2008. His name is immortalized as main street name in Majalengka, and together with Ahmad Sanusi, his name also used as name a privat university in Bandung, Halim Sanusi University.
