= Second ladies and gentlemen of Indonesia =

Second Lady of Indonesia
- Istri Wakil Presiden Indonesia
- Incumbent; Vacant since 12 November 2026
- Style: Her Excellency (diplomatic); Madam (informal)
- Residence: Vice Presidential Palace
- Seat: Jakarta (current); Nusantara (from 2026)
- Term length: 5 years
- Inaugural holder: Rahmi Rachim (as second lady); Taufiq Kiemas (as second gentleman)
- Formation: 18 November 1945
- Website: www.wapresri.go.id/berita-ibu-selvi-gibran (Official website of Mrs. Selvi Ananda)

Throughout Indonesian history, the title of Second Lady (Indonesian: Istri Wakil Presiden, lit. 'Wife of the Vice President') or Second Gentleman (Indonesian: Suami Wakil Presiden, lit. 'Husband of the Vice President') has been used to refer to the wife or husband of the vice president of Indonesia. While the Constitution of Indonesia does not mention anything about the spouses of the vice president, it continues to hold significant influence in the Indonesian society.

== List of title holders ==
No.	Portrait	Name	Tenure	Age at tenure start	Vice President Date of marriage	Ref.
1		Rahmi Rachim; 1926–1999 (aged 73)	18 November 1945 – 1 December 1956	19 years, 275 days	Mohammad Hatta; 18 November 1945	
2		Pintakapurnama	23 March 1973 – 23 March 1978	Unknown	Hamengkubuwono IX; 1940	
3		Nelly Ilyas; 1925–2007 (aged 81)	23 March 1978 – 11 March 1983	52 years, 312 days	Adam Malik; 1942	
4		Karlinah Djaja Atmadja; 1930–2025 (aged 95)	11 March 1983 – 11 March 1988	52 years, 224 days	Umar Wirahadikusumah; 2 February 1957	
5		Ratu Emma Norma; 1927–2012 (aged 85)	11 March 1988 – 11 March 1993	61 years, 8 days	Sudharmono; 1951	
6		Tuti Sutiawati born 1940	11 March 1993 – 11 March 1998	62 years, 342 days	Try Sutrisno; 5 February 1961	
7		Hasri Ainun Besari; 1937–2010 (aged 73)	11 March 1998 – 21 May 1998	60 years, 212 days	B. J. Habibie; 12 May 1962	
8		Taufiq Kiemas; 1942–2013 (aged 70)	21 October 1999 – 23 July 2001	56 years, 294 days	Megawati Sukarnoputri; 8 March 1973	
9		Asmaniah; 1942–2017 (aged 75)	26 July 2001 – 20 October 2004	58 years, 364 days	Hamzah Haz; 1964	
10		Mufidah Mi'ad Saad born 1943	20 October 2004 – 20 October 2009	61 years, 251 days	Jusuf Kalla; 27 August 1967	
11		Herawati born 1944	20 October 2009 – 20 October 2014	65 years, 247 days	Boediono; 16 May 1969	
12 (10)		Mufidah Mi'ad Saad born 1943	20 October 2014 – 20 October 2019	71 years, 250 days	Jusuf Kalla; 27 August 1967	
13		Wury Estu Handayani born 1974	20 October 2019 – 20 October 2024	45 years, 228 days	Ma'ruf Amin; 31 May 2014	
14		Selvi Ananda born 1989	20 October 2024 – 12 November 2026	35 years, 285 days	Gibran Rakabuming Raka; 11 June 2015	

== See also ==
- List of vice presidents of Indonesia
- First ladies and gentlemen of Indonesia
- List of presidents of Indonesia
- Prime Minister of Indonesia
