= Selvi Ananda =

Second Lady of Indonesia

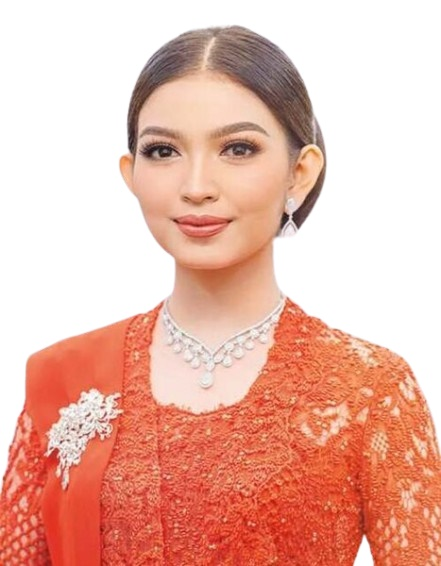
- Selvi in 2024

Second Lady of Indonesia
- In role 20 October 2024 – 12 November 2026
- Vice President: Gibran Rakabuming Raka
- Preceded by: Wury Estu Handayani
- Succeeded by: Vacant

Personal details
- Born: Selvi Ananda Putri; 9 January 1989 (age 37) Surakarta, Central Java, Indonesia
- Spouse: Gibran Rakabuming Raka (m. 2015)
- Children: 2
- Parents: Ignatius Didit Supriyadi (father); Sri Partini (mother)

Selvi Ananda Putri (born 9 January 1989) is an Indonesian bank teller and news presenter who was the Second Lady of Indonesia, as the wife of Gibran Rakabuming Raka, the 14th vice president of Indonesia from 20 October 2024 until her husband's resignation on 12 November 2026. She is also the daughter-in-law of Joko Widodo, the seventh president, and First Lady Iriana.

== Career ==
=== Presenter and banker ===
During her college years, Selvi worked as a presenter on the local television station TATV (Terang Abadi Television). After completing her college education, Selvi worked at Panin Bank, a private bank based in Indonesia.

=== Second Lady of Indonesia ===
Gibran assumed office as vice president on 20 October 2024, and Selvi Ananda became the Second Lady. She is the second youngest second lady of Indonesia after Siti Rahmiati Hatta, wife of the first vice president Mohammad Hatta. She also became the General Chair of the National Crafts Council, succeeding Wury Estu Handayani. In January, she was appointed the central management of the National Crafts Council at the Vice President's Palace. The Dekranas management consists of the spouse/companion of ministers in Red and White Cabinet.

In addition, she has assumed most of the functions of the First Lady on social affairs, as the First Lady's seat is vacant due to the separation of Prabowo Subianto and his wife Titiek Suharto in 1998.

With the completion of the Vice Presidential Palace in January 2026, the office of vice president has begun its relocation process to Nusantara. She, her husband, and their two children will start to reside in Nusantara within 2026.

== Personal life ==
She was married to Gibran on 11 June 2015. Their first child, a son named Jan Ethes Srinarendra, was born on 10 March 2016. She later gave birth to a daughter named La Lembah Manah at the Muhammadiyah Hospital in Surakarta on 15 November 2019.

Honorary titles
Preceded by Wury Estu Handayani	Second Lady of Indonesia; 2024–present	Incumbent
