= Meutia Hatta Swasono =

Indonesian politician

Meutia Farida Hatta Swasono
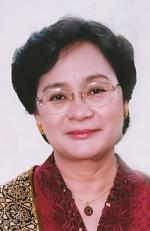

Minister of Women's Empowerment
- In office 21 October 2004 – 20 October 2009
- President: Susilo Bambang Yudhoyono
- Preceded by: Sri Redjeki Sumarjoto
- Succeeded by: Linda Amalia Sari

Personal details
- Born: 21 March 1947 (age 79) Yogyakarta, Indonesia
- Party: Justice and Unity Party
- Spouse: Sri Edi Swasono (m. 1973)
- Relations: Gustika Fardani Jusuf (niece)
- Children: Tan Sri Zulfikar Yusuf; Sri Juwita Hanum Swasono
- Parents: Mohammad Hatta (father); Siti Rahmiati Hatta (mother)
- Education: University of Indonesia
- Occupation: Politician
- Profession: Bureaucrat, lecturer

Meutia Farida Hatta Swasono (née Hatta; born 21 March 1947) is an Indonesian anthropologist and politician who served as Indonesia's Minister of Women's Empowerment in Susilo Bambang Yudhoyono's United Indonesia Cabinet. She is the daughter of Indonesia's first vice president, Muhammad Hatta.

== Education ==
Swasono graduated from St Ursula Junior High School in 1966. She attended the University of Indonesia from 1967 to 1991, studying in the Department of Anthropology, including as a post-graduate.

== Career ==
=== Teaching ===
Swasono has worked as a teacher from many years. Starting in 1975, she began working as a teacher at the University of Indonesia, in the Department of Anthropology. Started in 1984, she began working as a teacher in the department's post-graduate program, as well as a guest lecturer at Bung Hatta University and as a teacher in the Faculty of Social and Political Sciences for the University of Indonesia.

Within the Department of Anthropology at the University of Indonesia, Swasono has held many positions. From 1984-1987, as secretary, from 1987-1990, as chairperson, from 1996-1996 and 2002-2003 as chairperson for the post-graduate program, from 1997-2002, as chairperson for the Diploma Program on Tourist.

In addition, from 1997-2004, she worked in the Faculty of Medicine as teaching staff for Nutritional Anthropology. From 1998-2004, she worked as a teacher for Southeast Asian Ministers of Educations Organisation (SEAMEO) and Tropical Medicine and Public Health (Tropmed), Regional Center for Community Nutrition (RCCN), University of Indonesia. From 1999-2004, she worked as an academic supervisor for post-graduate candidates in the Faculty of Public Health.

From 2005-2009, Swasono worked as an academic supervisor for doctoral candidates at the Institute of Agriculture of Bogor in West Java. From 2005-2009, Swasono worked as an academic supervisor for doctoral candidates at the University of Indonesia, for the post-graduate program on Environment Studies.

=== Editing ===
Starting in 1975, Swasono began editing the Jurnal Antropologi Indonesia (JAI or Indonesian Journal of Anthropology) and the Journal of the Dept. of Anthropology for the University of Indonesia. She has also done editing for various other publications, including research reports and books.

=== Associations ===
Swasono has been a member of several different associations. She joined the Association of Indonesian Anthropology (AAI) in 1985. She joined the Wastraprema (Indonesian Textiles Association) in 2002. From 2002-2012, she served as the chairperson of the Hatta Foundation.

=== Politics ===
In 1999, Swasono helped co-found the Justice and Unity Party. In 2008, she served as the chairperson for the Party of Justice and Unity of Indonesia, which split from the Justice and Unity Party.

From 2003-2004, Swarsono served as a deputy minister for the Preservation and Development of Culture, under the Ministry of Culture and Tourism. From 2004-2009, she served as the minister for the Ministry of Women's Empowerment.

== See also ==
- List of female cabinet ministers of Indonesia
