= Marciano Norman =

Former chief of the Indonesian State Intelligence Agency

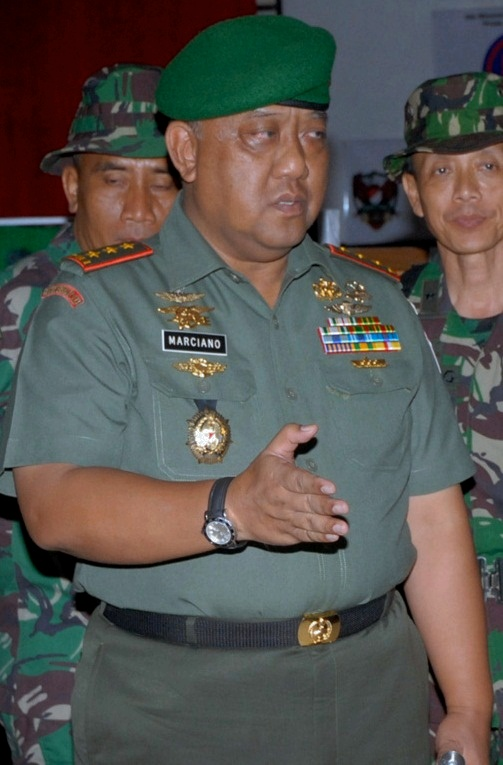
- Norman during Operation Garuda Shield
- Born: 28 October 1954 (age 71); Banjarmasin, South Kalimantan, Indonesia
- Military career
- Allegiance: Indonesia
- Branch: Indonesian Army
- Service years: 1978–2012
- Rank: Lieutenant General

Lieutenant General (Ret) Marciano Norman (born Banjarmasin, 28 October 1954) is the former Chief the Indonesian State Intelligence Agency.

== Biography ==
Norman was born in Banjarmasin, South Kalimantan on 28 October 1954 to Norman Sasono and his wife. He graduated from the Indonesian Military Academy in 1978 and began his military career by commanding the Yonkav 7 Platoon, in the Kodam Jaya military area. He then went on to hold numerous positions within Kodam Jaya, including with the 7 Cavalry, in which he had a mid-ranking position during the May 1998 riots of Indonesia.

From 2008 to 2009, Norman commanded the Paspampres. In 2010 he was reported to have a net worth of Rp. 9.021 billion (US$1 million). In 2010 he also took a position as the leader of Kodam Jaya. In April 2011, he became the commander of the Army Training and Education Center, a position which he held until October 2011.

In June 2011 it was announced that Norman was a candidate to become the leader of the Indonesian military, although he was not selected. On 17 October 2011 President Susilo Bambang Yudhoyono chose Norman to replace Sutanto as the leader of the Indonesian State Intelligence Agency. Nani Afrida, writing for The Jakarta Post, suggested that his nomination was meant to consolidate the military's support for Yudhoyono. Norman has been described as "Yudhoyono's confidant". He has promised to focus on terrorism, separatism, and economic issues, as well as improve the intelligence agency's performance and reliability.

== Personal life ==
Norman is married to Triwatty. Together they have five children. He enjoys swimming, horseback riding, and watching movies with his family. Beginning in 2011, he is serving a 5-year term as the leader of the Indonesian Taekwondo Association.
