= Indonesian Justice and Unity Party =

Political party in Indonesia

Justice and Unity Party Partai Keadilan dan Persatuan
- Abbreviation: PKP
- General Chairman: Isfan Fajar Satrio
- Secretary-General: Rully Soekarta
- Founders: Edi Sudrajat; Try Sutrisno; Hayono Isman
- Founded: 15 December 1998; 27 years ago (as PKP, original); 2 September 2002; 23 years ago (as PKPI); 2 September 2021; 4 years ago (as PKP, rename)
- Split from: Golkar
- Headquarters: Jakarta
- Membership (2022): 553,594
- Ideology: Pancasila; Indonesian nationalism Secularism; Moderate liberalism
- Political position: Centre
- National affiliation: Advanced Indonesia Coalition (since 2024); Onward Indonesia Coalition (2018–2024); Great Indonesia Coalition (2014–2018)
- DPR seats: 0 / 580
- DPRD I seats: 0 / 2,372
- DPRD II seats: 0 / 17,510

The party's logo in the 1999 election.

The Justice and Unity Party (Indonesian: Partai Keadilan dan Persatuan, abbreviated as PKP) formerly known as Indonesian Justice and Unity Party (Indonesian: Partai Keadilan dan Persatuan Indonesia, abbreviated as PKPI) is a political party in Indonesia.

The party was founded as the Justice and Unity Party (Indonesian: Partai Keadilan dan Persatuan, PKP) on 15 December 1998 / 15 January 1999 as a split from Golkar Party. According to PKP leaders, particularly retired General and first party president Edi Sudrajat, PKP's leader, Golkar was insufficiently cooperative with reform movements then active. The PKP also argued that Golkar's attitude toward Pancasila and the original 1945 constitution threatened the unity of Indonesia.

In the 1999 legislative elections, the party won 1.01% of the vote. This was not enough to qualify it to run in the following elections, so the party members established a new party under the current name. The party chairmanship remained in the hands of Edi Sudradjat. In the 2004 legislative elections, the party won 1.3% of the popular vote and 1 out of 550 seats. In the 2009 legislative election, the party won 0.9 percent of the vote, less than the 2.5 percent electoral threshold, meaning that it lost its only seat in the People's Representative Council.

The party opposes the International Monetary Fund and privatization. Its main support is concentrated in North Sumatra, West Java and Central Java. It did not qualify for the 2024 election. The party is connected to the Indonesian National Armed Forces.

== Political identities ==
The party adheres to secular-nationalist views.

The party believes that the Indonesian state should control the Prosperous Justice Party (PKS) so the party have a more moderate stance, if the PKS cannot be controlled, the Prosperous Justice Party (PKS) should banned like the FPI.

== Leaders ==
No.	Name	Image	Constituency / title	Term of office		Election results
No.	Name	Image	Constituency / title	Took office	Left office	Election results
Split from: Golkar (Sudrajat's faction)
General Chairpersons of the Justice and Unity Party (1999–2002)
1	Edi Sudrajat (1938-2026)		—	15 January 1999	2 September 2002	1999 Unopposed
General Chairpersons of the Indonesian Justice and Unity Party (2002–2021)
(1)	Edi Sudrajat (1938-2026)		—	2 September 2002	1 December 2006 (Note: died in office)	2005 Unopposed
–	Haris Sudarno (born 1941) (Acting)		—	15 January 2007	14 January 2008	
2	Meutia Hatta (born 1947)		Minister of Women Empowerment (Note: until 20 October 2009)	14 January 2008	13 April 2010	2008 Unopposed
3	Sutiyoso (born 1944)		Director of State Intelligence Agency (Note: since 8 July 2015)	13 April 2010	15 June 2015	2010 Unopposed
–	Isran Noor (born 1959) (Acting)		—	23 June 2015	27 August 2016	
4	A.M. Hendropriyono (born 1945)		—	27 Agustus 2016	13 April 2018	2016 Unopposed
5	Diaz Hendropriyono (born 1978)		Special Staff to the President	19 May 2018	10 May 2021	2018 Unopposed
–	Muhammad Nur Sunan Kalijaga (Acting)		—	10 May 2021	26 May 2021	
6	Yussuf Solichien (born 1950)		—	26 May 2021	2 September 2021	2021 Unopposed
General Chairpersons of the Justice and Unity Party (2021–present)
(6)	Yussuf Solichien (born 1950)		—	2 September 2021	25 February 2023	
7	Aslizar Nurdin Tanjung		—	25 February 2023	12 June 2025	
–	Raden Dodi Dermawan S. (Acting)		—	12 June 2025	15 January 2026	
8	Isfan Fajar Satrio (born 1970)		—	15 January 2026	Incumbent	2026 Unopposed

== Election results ==
=== Legislative election results ===
Election	Ballot number	Leader	Seats		Total votes	Share of votes	Outcome of election
Election	Ballot number	Leader	No.	±	Total votes	Share of votes	Outcome of election
1999	41	Edi Sudrajat	4 / 462		1,065,686	1.01%	Opposition
2004	10	Edi Sudrajat	1 / 550	▼3	1,424,240	1.26%	Governing coalition
2009	7	Meutia Hatta	0 / 560	▼1	934,892	0.90%	Governing coalition
2014	15	Sutiyoso	0 / 560	0	1,143,094	0.91%	Governing coalition
2019	20	Diaz Hendropriyono	0 / 575	0	312,775	0.22%	Governing coalition
2024	Did not qualify						

=== Presidential election results ===
Election	Ballot number	Candidate	Running mate	1st round (Total votes)	Share of votes	Outcome	2nd round (Total votes)	Share of votes	Outcome
2004	4	Susilo Bambang Yudhoyono	Jusuf Kalla	39,838,184	33.57%	Runoff	69,266,350	60.62%	Elected
2009	2	Susilo Bambang Yudhoyono	Boediono	73,874,562	60.80%	Elected			
2014	2	Joko Widodo	Jusuf Kalla	70,997,833	53.15%	Elected			
2019	01	Joko Widodo	Ma'ruf Amin	85,607,362	55.50%	Elected			
