= Ahmad Sanusi =

Indonesian Islamic scholar and freedom fighter

Kyai Haji Ahmad Sanusi
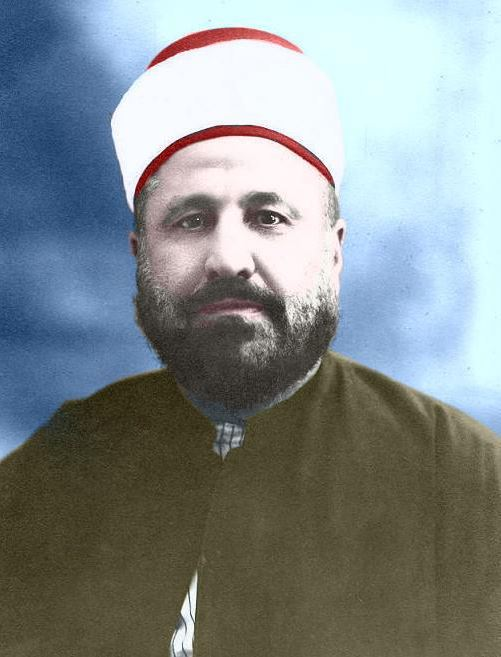
- Born: September 18, 1888; Sukabumi Regency, Dutch East Indies
- Died: July 31, 1950 (aged 61); Sukabumi, Indonesia
- Citizenship: Indonesian
- Occupation: Ulama

Ahmad Sanusi (September 18, 1888 – July 31, 1950) was an Indonesian Islamic scholar, nationalist, freedom fighter, and member of Investigating Committee for Preparatory Work for Independence. He was also co-founder of Islamic Community Unity (Persatuan Ummat Islam, PUI).

== Later life and death ==
After the Dutch–Indonesian Round Table Conference, Sanusi back to Sukabumi and planned to joined Islamic Community Unity of Indonesia (Persatuan Ummat Islam Indonesia, PUII) with Islamic Peoples Bond (Perikatan Ummat Islam, PUI) which was founded by Abdul Halim. However, on end of July 1950, he died and buried in near of Syamsul Ulum Islamic Boarding School. In 1952, these two organizations officially combined into Islamic Community Unity.

== Legacy ==
Ahmad Sanusi was awarded Mahaputera Star Class III (Bintang Mahaputera Utama) on August 12, 1992, and Mahaputera Star Class II (Bintang Mahaputera Adipradana) on November 9, 2009. He was also recognized as National Hero of Indonesia via Presidential Decree no. 96/TK/2022 on November 3, 2022.

In Sukabumi, his name is used for a street name, as well as bus station type A which was officially operated in October 2016. One of his work, the tafsir book Raudhatul Irfan, is inspired to named a mosque in regency of the same name. Halim Sanusi University, a private university in Bandung, bears his name alongside Abdul Halim; used they last name to honor.
