= A.M. Hendropriyono =

Indonesian military person and politician

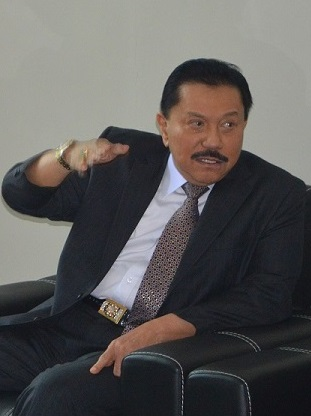

Head of the Indonesian State Intelligence Agency (BIN)
- In office 9 August 2001 – 8 December 2004
- President: Megawati Soekarnoputri; Susilo Bambang Yudhoyono
- Preceded by: Arie J. Kumaat (Head Of BAKIN)
- Succeeded by: Syamsir Siregar

Chairman of Indonesian Justice and Unity Party
- In office 28 August 2016 – 13 May 2018
- Preceded by: Sutiyoso; Isran Noor (acting)

Personal details
- Born: 7 May 1945 (age 81) Yogyakarta, Japanese-occupied East Indies
- Relations: Andika Perkasa (son-in-law)
- Children: Diah Erwiany Hendropriyono; Rony Hendropriyono; Diaz Faisal Malik Hendropriyono
- Education: Indonesian Military Academy, Class of 1967

Military service
- Allegiance: Indonesia
- Branch/service: Indonesian Army
- Years of service: 1967–2000
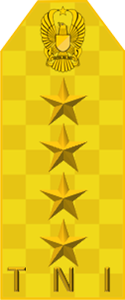
- Rank: General (honorary)
- Unit: Infantry (Kopassus)
- Battles/wars: Communist insurgency in Sarawak; Operation Lotus; Insurgency in East Timor

General Abdullah Mahmud Hendropriyono (/hɛnˌdroʊpri.oʊˈnoʊ/ hen-DROH-pree-oh-NOH; born 7 May 1945) is a retired honorary general from Kopassus, the Indonesian Army special forces group. Hendropriyono was the first head of Indonesia's State Intelligence Agency (BIN), and was general chairman of the Indonesian Justice and Unity Party (PKPI).

== Education ==
A.M. Hendropriyono's primary school education began at SR Muhammadiyah in Kemayoran, Jakarta, and continued at SR Negeri on Lematang Street in Jakarta. For his secondary education he attended State Junior High School Number 5, Section B (science track) on Dr. Sutomo Street in Jakarta, and graduated from State High School Number 2, Section B (science track) on Gajah Mada Street in Jakarta.

=== Higher Education ===
A.M. Hendropriyono's general education includes becoming a graduate of Administration from the State Administrative Science College (STIA-LAN), a Law Graduate from the Military Law College (STHM), a graduate in Economics from the Open University (UT) in Jakarta, a graduate in industrial engineering from Jenderal Ahmad Yani University (Unjani) in Bandung, earning a master's degree in Business Administration from the University of the City of Manila in the Philippines, earning a master's degree in law from STHM, and in July 2009 earning a Doctorate Degree at Gadjah Mada University (UGM) in Yogyakarta with a Cum Laude distinction. On 7 May 2014, he was officially bestowed the title of Professor of Intelligence by the State Intelligence College. He is the first and only Professor of Intelligence in the world. For this accomplishment, he was entered into the Indonesian Museum of Records (MURI). This appointment was made in line with Decree of the Indonesian Minister of Education and Culture No. 2576f/A4.3/KP/2014.

== Governmental career ==
Hendropriyono served as Director of the Indonesian State Intelligence Agency between 2001 and 2004.

President-elect Joko Widodo named Hendropriyono an adviser of his transition team on 9 August 2014.

=== Military service ===
Hendropriyono was involved in the 1989 Talangsari incident that left many Lampung civilians dead, wounded or missing. It was there that he gained his nickname, "the Butcher of Lampung". A United States diplomatic cables leak alleged that Hendropriyono "chaired two meetings at which Munir's assassination was planned" and a witness at those meetings told police that "only the time and method of the murder changed from the plans he heard discussed; original plans were to kill Munir in his office." When Hendropriyono was appointed to the National Intelligence Board (BIN, or Badan Intelijen Nasional) the appointment was bitterly condemned by Munir who was guiding an investigation into Hendropriyono's role in human rights abuses for a prosecution. Hendropriyono was summoned for questioning by a presidential fact-finding team, but he refused to comply with the investigation. Recommendations by the team for Hendropriyono's prosecution were completely ignored by the police and the attorney general's office. In 2014, Hendropriyono admitted to journalist Allan Nairn that he bore command responsibility for Munir Said Thalib's assassination, and he was ready to accept being put on trial. However, former Minister/State Secretary Sudi Silalahi, the Cabinet Secretary during the term of Indonesian president Susilo Bambang Yudhoyono, announced the legal measures which were taken by the government and law enforcement authorities to follow up on the final report of the Fact-Finding Team (TPF) in the Munir case and stated that no evidence was found implying A.M. Hendropriyono. "Regarding the recommendation of the TPF which mentioned the possible involvement of Mr. AM Hendropriyono, from the findings of the preliminary and criminal investigations (which were conducted) of the witnesses, of those who were charged and convicted, and of the available evidence, no connection was found to Mr. AM Hendropriyono" Sudi Silalahi said during a press conference held in Cikeas, West Java on 25 October 2016. However, the report of the fact-finding team itself has still not been made public.
