= Wury Estu Handayani =

Second lady of Indonesia

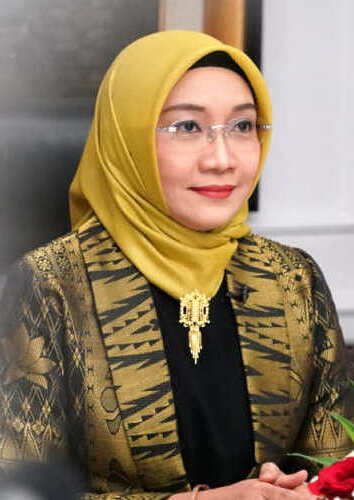

Second Lady of Indonesia
- In role 20 October 2019 – 20 October 2024
- Vice President: Ma'ruf Amin
- Preceded by: Mufidah Kalla
- Succeeded by: Selvi Ananda

Personal details
- Born: 6 March 1974 (age 52) Jakarta, Indonesia
- Spouse(s): Bangsdin M. Noor (m. 1995; died 2012) Ma'ruf Amin (m. 2014)
- Children: 2

Wury Estu Handayani (Indonesian: [wʌɹisuːhænde͡ɪˈɑːni]; born 6 March 1974) is an Indonesian civil servant who was the second lady of Indonesia from 2019 to 2024, as the wife of Ma'ruf Amin, the 13th vice president of Indonesia. She previously worked at the South Jakarta Health Department from 1995 to 2019, and held the position of Treasurer of the Indonesian Dental Nurses Association from 2005 to 2010.

== Early life ==
Handayani was born in Jakarta on 6 March 1974. She completed her undergraduate education at the Poltekkes Dental Health Academy of the Indonesian Department of Health in 2001. As a student, she demonstrated a strong commitment to her field of study and was active in various extracurricular activities. After graduation, she began her career as a dental nurse at a health center in Pasar Minggu, South Jakarta.

== Marriage and office ==
Handayani and Amin were introduced to each other through mutual friends and quickly realized that they had a strong connection. They got married soon after, in a ceremony at the Istiqlal Mosque in Jakarta on 31 May 2014. The wedding was attended by prominent figures including former Vice President Jusuf Kalla and former Minister of Economy Hatta Rajasa.

Both Handayani and Amin were widowed before their marriage; her first husband had died in 2012 and his first wife died in 2013. She has two daughters from her first marriage, both of whom she raised on her own.

As the second lady, Handayani represented Indonesia in various international events and has used her platform to promote the country's culture and heritage. She is actively involved in charitable and social causes, particularly those related to healthcare and education.

Honorary titles
Preceded by Mufidah Mi'ad Saad	Second Lady of Indonesia; 2019–2024	Succeeded by Selvi Ananda
