= Saefullah =

Indonesian bureaucrat

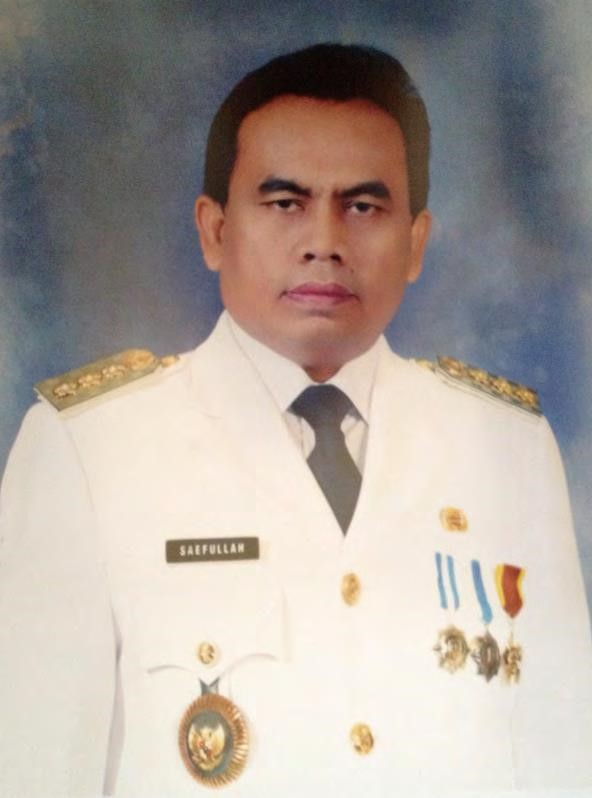
- Official portrait, 2010

Regional Secretary of Jakarta
- In office 11 July 2014 – 14 September 2020
- Governor: Joko Widodo; Basuki Tjahaja Purnama; Djarot Saiful Hidayat; Anies Baswedan
- Preceded by: Fadjar Panjaitan
- Succeeded by: Sri Haryati (acting); Marullah Matali

Acting Governor of Jakarta
- In office 15 October 2017 – 16 October 2017
- Preceded by: Djarot Saiful Hidayat
- Succeeded by: Anies Baswedan

Mayor of Central Jakarta
- In office 4 November 2010 – 11 July 2014
- Governor: Fauzi Bowo; Joko Widodo
- Preceded by: Sylviana Murni
- Succeeded by: Rustam Effendi

Personal details
- Born: 11 February 1964; Jakarta, Indonesia
- Died: 16 September 2020 (aged 56); Jakarta, Indonesia
- Cause of death: COVID-19
- Political party: Independent

Saefullah (11 February 1964 – 16 September 2020) was an Indonesian bureaucrat and teacher. He primarily served in the regional government of Jakarta, reaching the rank of regional secretary in 2014. He had previously served as appointed mayor of Central Jakarta between 2010 and 2014, following a seven-year career in Jakarta's educational offices. He died in 2020 due to COVID-19.

== Early life and education ==
Saefullah was born on 11 February 1964 in Cilincing, North Jakarta, in the administrative village (kelurahan) of Rorotan. He studied in Bekasi for his elementary school, and in Jakarta's public schools for middle and high school. He studied at a teachers' school instead of a regular high school.

He later studied and obtained degrees from Muhammadiyah Teachers' Institute (1988), Jakarta State University (2000), and Padjadjaran University (2009).

== Bureaucratic career ==
After graduating from teachers' school in 1982, Saefullah began teaching as a semi-permanent honorary teacher until 1984, when he became a formal civil servant as an elementary teacher in Manggarai, Central Jakarta. He became headmaster after eight years of teaching and superintendent after another six years. He was promoted to head of the education office in West Jakarta in 2003. By 2004, he was head for middle school education for the whole of Jakarta, and was further promoted to head of the youth and sports office for Jakarta in 2009.

Saefullah was appointed mayor of Central Jakarta on 4 November 2010. During this tenure, he worked on relocating street vendors from Tanah Abang and Monas, and was also appointed commissioner to Persija Jakarta in 2013 while the football club was experiencing a financial crisis and player strikes.

On 11 July 2014, then-acting governor Basuki Tjahaja Purnama appointed Saefullah into the post of Jakarta's regional secretary, the highest-ranked bureaucratic office in the provincial government. The position had been nominally vacant at that time since April 2013 due to the resignation of the previous holder. Saefullah had previously participated in a competency test for the position. According to Basuki, while another bureaucrat Sylviana Murni had placed higher in the competency test, Saefullah was appointed due to his younger age.

In March 2016, Saefullah had been elected as chairman for the Jakarta branch of Nahdlatul Ulama. He stated his intention to run for the 2017 Jakarta gubernatorial election and received an endorsement from the National Awakening Party, though he did not end up running. He very briefly served as acting governor of Jakarta between the end of Djarot Saiful Hidayat's term on 15 October 2017 and the start of Anies Baswedan's term the following day; he referred to the length of his tenure as 40 hours (24 hours on 15 October, and 16 hours on 16 October). His five-year appointment as regional secretary, which would have expired in October 2019, was extended by Baswedan in July 2019. He was proposed by Gerindra in November 2019 as a potential vice governor to replace Sandiaga Uno, though the office went to Ahmad Riza Patria.

== Death ==
Saefullah, alongside West Jakarta mayor Uus Kuswanto, were confirmed to have tested positive for COVID-19 on 13 September 2020, during the COVID-19 pandemic in Indonesia. He had previously been admitted to a hospital since as early as 8 September due to stomach problems. As he was hospitalized, on 14 September 2020 Governor Anies Baswedan appointed his assistant for economics and finance, Sri Haryati, to take over his day-to-day duties. He died at noon on 16 September 2020, due to COVID-19-induced septic shock and acute respiratory distress syndrome.

On the same day as his death, he was buried at his family's grave in Cilincing, with grave workers wearing biohazard outfits according to safety protocols.
