= Happy Djarot =

Indonesian Senator from Jakarta
- Incumbent
- Assumed office 1 October 2024
- Majority: 656,815

Head of TP-PKK of Jakarta
- In office 25 July 2017 – 26 October 2017
- President: Joko Widodo
- Governor: Djarot Saiful Hidayat; Anies Baswedan
- Preceded by: Veronica Tan
- Succeeded by: Fery Farhati Ganis

First Lady of Jakarta
- In office 9 May 2017 – 15 October 2017
- President: Joko Widodo
- Governor: Djarot Saiful Hidayat
- Preceded by: Veronica Tan
- Succeeded by: Fery Farhati Ganis

Personal details
- Born: Happy Farida; 3 June 1969 (age 57) Surabaya, East Java, Indonesia

Happy Farida Djarot (born 3 June 1969), better known as Happy Djarot, is an Indonesian politician who is a member of the Regional Representative Council representing Jakarta since 2024.

== Early life and family ==
Happy was born in Surabaya on 3 June 1969. She studied at privately run schools in Surabaya, completing high school in 1989. She then received a bachelor's degree from 17 August University Surabaya in 1994, and began working for Bank Rakyat Indonesia (BRI) that year. She married Djarot Saiful Hidayat, PDI-P politician and later governor of Jakarta, in 1999. The couple has three children. Some time after Djarot was elected mayor of Blitar in 2000, Happy resigned from her job at BRI.

== Organizations and politics ==
During the terms of her husband as mayor of Blitar, then as vice governor and governor of Jakarta in 2014, Happy became involved at Blitar's and later Jakarta's Family Welfare Movement (PKK) organizations. She accompanied her husband while campaigning during the 2017 Jakarta gubernatorial election. After Anies Baswedan won the election, both Djarot and Happy did not attend the swearing in of their successors as governor and as PKK head, respectively, instead going to vacation at Labuan Bajo.

In the 2024 legislative election, Happy ran for a seat in the Regional Representative Council (DPD) representing Jakarta. She placed second of all Jakarta candidates with 656,815 votes, securing one of the four seats. She was sworn in on 1 October 2024. Within DPD, she is part of the Second Committee which covered resource management and the economy. As a senator, she has promoted urban farming activities in Jakarta's parks for food security purposes.
