= Public Facility Maintenance Agency =

Indonesian waste handling agency

- Penanganan Prasarana dan Sarana Umum

Maintenance and waste handling agency overview
- Formed: 13 May 2015
- Jurisdiction: Jakarta
- Status: Active
- Employees: 10,000 – 19,000

The Public Facility Maintenance Agency (Indonesian: Penanganan Prasarana dan Sarana Umum; PPSU) is a maintenance and waste handling agency structure within the city of Jakarta, Indonesia. It was established by governor Basuki Tjahaja Purnama in 2015. Deployed at the kelurahan level, the agency employs over 10,000 workers.

== History ==
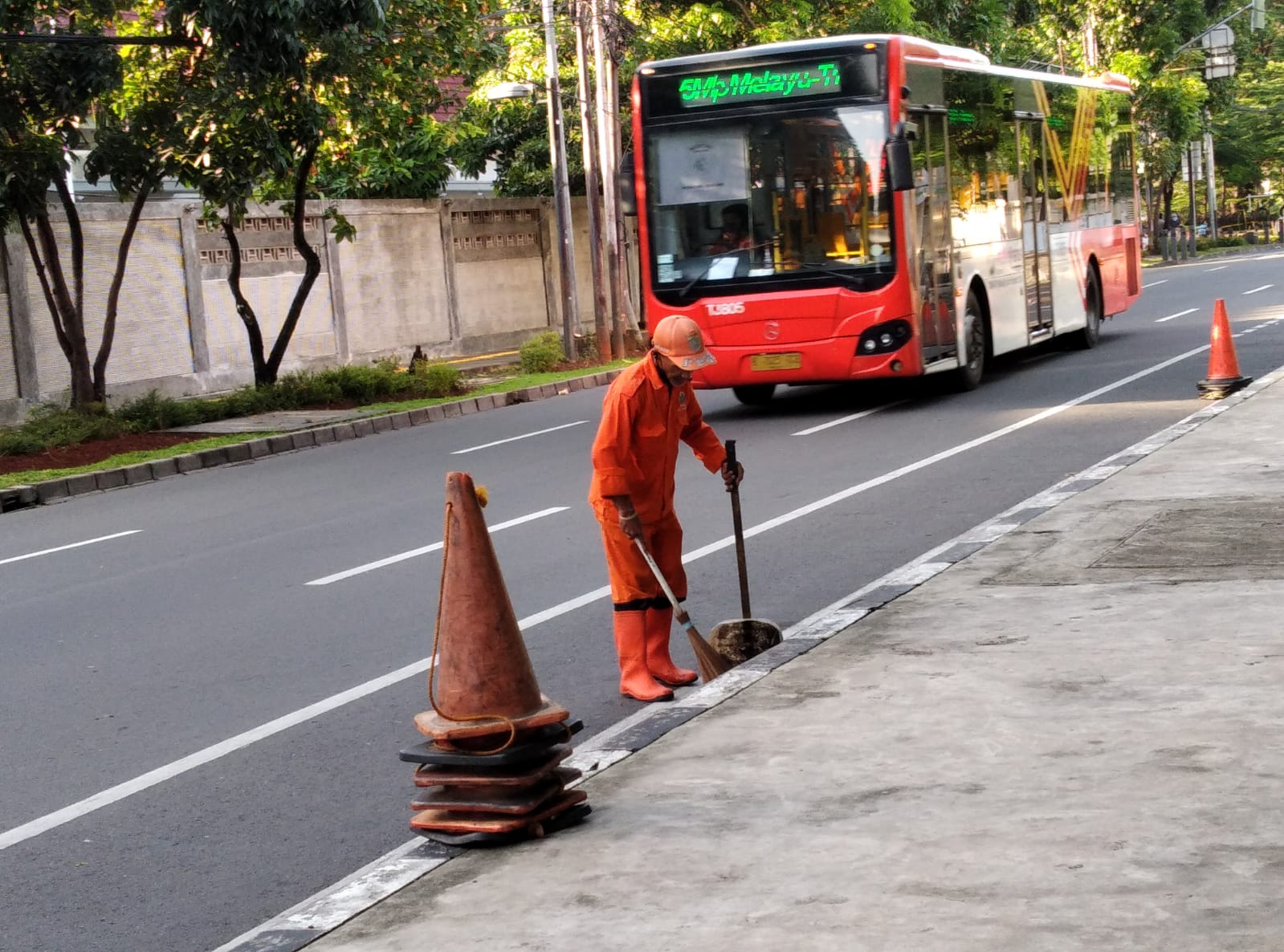
A PPSU worker in Central Jakarta.

The PPSU was formed by gubernatorial decree of Jakarta governor Basuki Tjahaja Purnama on 13 May 2015. Prior to the decree, municipal waste handling in Jakarta had been handled by ad hoc workers, with often unsatisfactory results. PPSU units were formed at the kelurahan (administrative village) level and worked under the direction of the local lurah (kelurahan head). By August 2015, over 12 thousand ad hoc workers had been recruited into the program, receiving a fixed salary and benefits under an employment contract. Generally, the workers received considerably higher income from the PPSU program compared to their ad hoc employment.

The program has been considered to be "one of the most successful" programs of Basuki's governorship. Upon his defeat in the 2017 gubernatorial election, there were concerns that the new governor Anies Baswedan would cancel the program. However, Baswedan (who had publicly praised the PPSU program during the electoral campaign) retained the program without reducing its number of employees, instead extending the employment contracts of the PPSU workers and raising their salaries.

== Operations ==
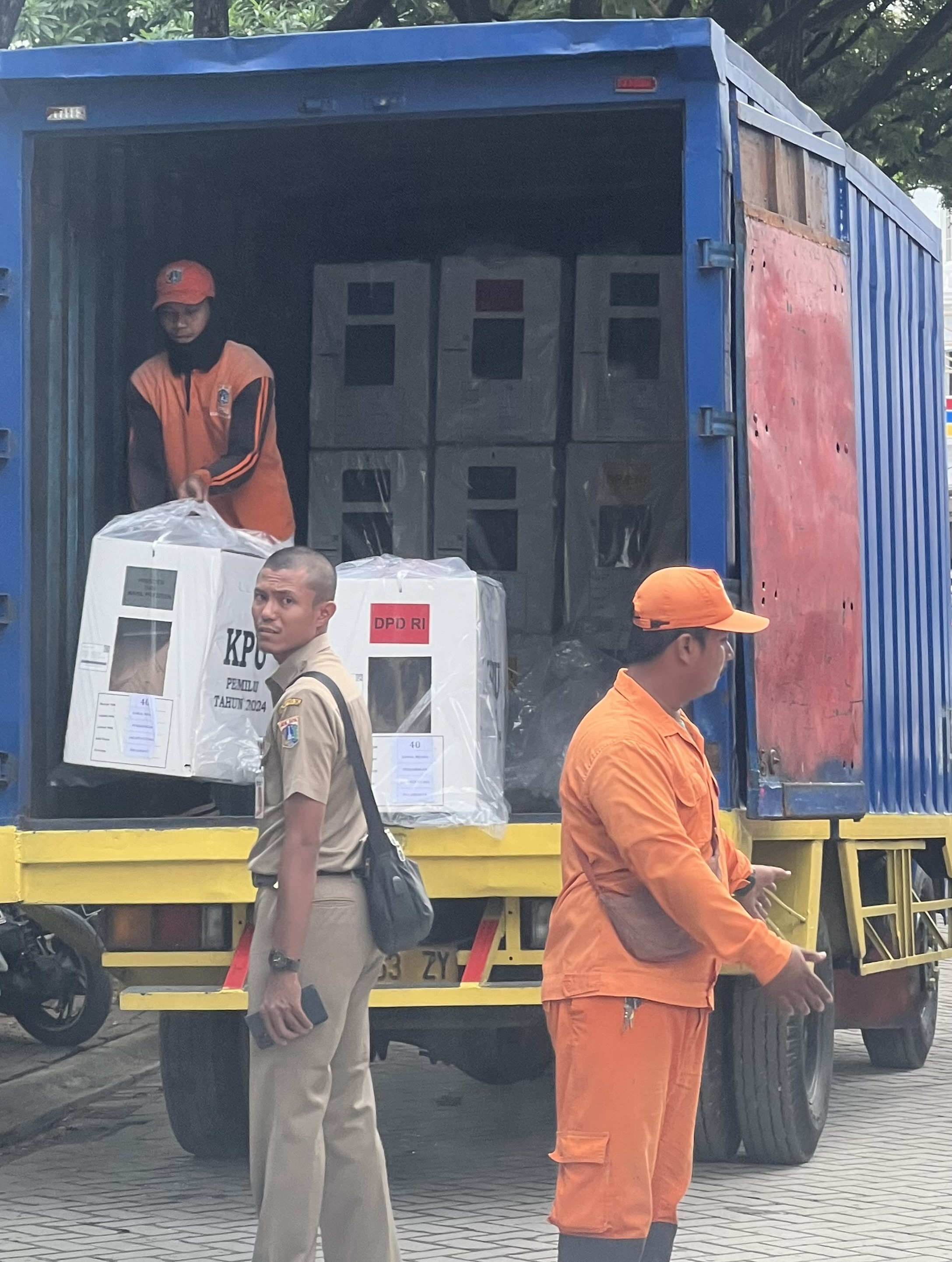
PPSU workers unloading ballot boxes for the 2024 general election.

At each kelurahan, between 40 and 70 PPSU workers are retained. PPSU objectives include handling residents' complaints within three working days, which covered trash cleanup, fixing potholes and broken sidewalks, trimming overgrown vegetation, and unclogging drainage. Beyond their public maintenance work, PPSU workers have also been deployed in the eviction of slum housing, disaster response and assistance, setting up urban farms, and providing logistical support for the General Elections Commission.

The total number of PPSU workers in Jakarta, as of April 2025, was estimated to be between 10,689 and 18,960. Most of the workers were male, most frequently aged between 31 and 40. The maximum age was 55, though it was raised to 58 in 2025 under governor Pramono Anung. Pramono also extended the length of each employment contract from one year to three years and reduced education requirements.

During their activities, PPSU workers wear an orange uniform, leading to their nickname as the "Orange Troops" (Indonesian: Pasukan Oranye). A similar uniform had been previously worn by ad hoc cleaning workers since the 1960s.

== Reception and impact ==
Indonesian newspaper Kompas conducted a survey of Jakartan residents' reception of PPSU, and found a 90 percent approval rating for the program. The reduced response time for handling maintenance issues was cited as a major positive. The low entry requirements were also cited as a positive, in providing work for otherwise unemployed or semi-employed residents. A 2025 recruitment drive for 1,100 additional PPSU workers received six or seven applicants for each vacancy.
