= Sri Haryati =

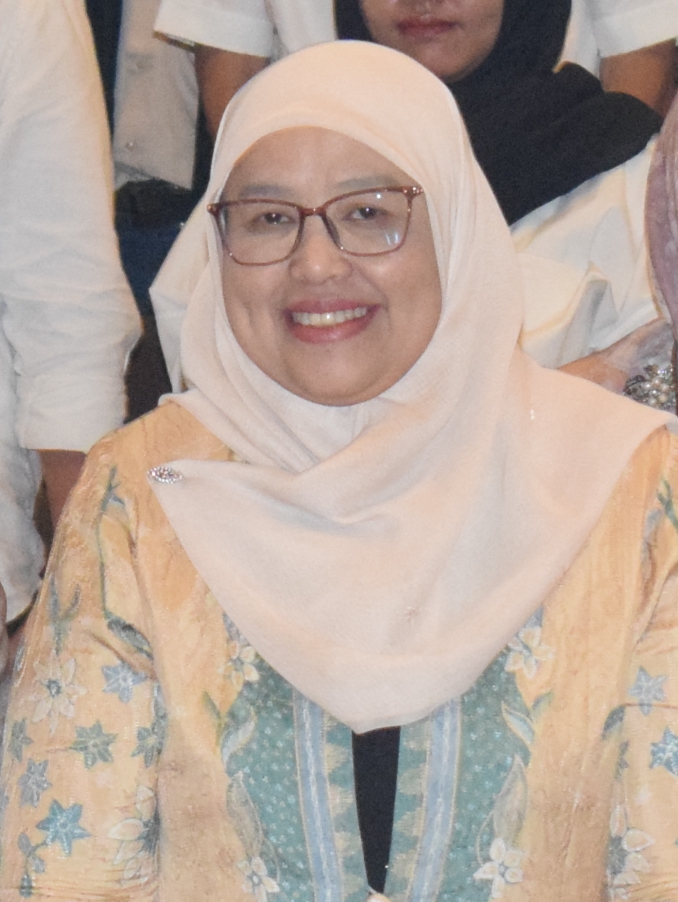

Director General of Urban Housing
- Incumbent
- Assumed office 20 January 2025
- Preceded by: office established

Regional Secretary of Jakarta
- Acting
- In office 14 September 2020 – 18 January 2021
- Governor: Anies Baswedan
- Preceded by: Saefullah
- Succeeded by: Marullah Matali

Personal details
- Born: July 7, 1971 (age 54) Bogor, West Java, Indonesia
- Children: 2
- Education: Bogor Agricultural Institute

Sri Haryati (born 7 July 1971) is an Indonesian bureaucrat who is currently serving as the director general of urban housing in the Ministry of Housing and Residential Area since 2025. Prior to her appointment into the ministry, Sri was the assistant to the Jakarta provincial secretary for economics and finance since 2018, and briefly assumed duties of the provincial secretary in an acting capacity from 2020 to 2021.

== Early life and education ==
Born in Bogor on 7 July 1971, Sri Haryati earned her undergraduate degree from the Faculty of Fisheries at the Bogor Agricultural Institute (IPB) in 1994. She continued her education at the same institution, completing her master's degree in 2003 and a doctoral degree in environmental science in 2013.

== Career ==
Sri Haryati began her career in 1997 as a civil servant candidate at the Jakarta provincial government's fisheries office, becoming a full civil servant a year later. In 2014, she served as the chief of the North Jakarta livestock, fisheries, and maritime services. On the same year, she was reassigned to the provincial government as the chief of the food security and outreach section within the maritime, agriculture, and food security office of the provincial government.

Her career progressed, and by 2016 she was appointed as the chief of the economics bureau within the provincial secretariat, a position she held until 2019. In this role, she was responsible for controlling inflation, particularly volatile food prices. She played a significant role in the zero-emission bus transition within TransJakarta, the Bus Rapid Transit service in Jakarta. She was double-hatted as the secretary of the Jakarta Regional Inflation Control Team (TPID), which in 2017 was named the best in Indonesia. She attributed the success to the collaborative efforts of various stakeholders, including the city's food-related state-owned enterprises.

In late 2018, Sri became the acting assistant to the Jakarta provincial secretary for economics and finance. She permanently assumed office on 9 January 2019. On 16 December of the same year, Sri became the acting chief of tourism and culture office of Jakarta, replacing Alberto Ali who was dismissed following a controversy over the Adikarya Wisata award given to Colosseum, a nightclub which was sanctioned by the National Narcotics Agency for drug-related issues. Sri also assumed duties as the acting chief of the Jakarta revenue office twice: first in early 2020 and second in March 2021.

On 14 September 2020, Sri temporarily assumed the day-to-day duties of provincial secretary Saefullah who was hospitalized due to COVID-19. Saefullah died two days later, and Sri was installed as the acting provincial secretary on 7 October 2020. Governor Anies Baswedan instructed Sri to swiftly handle the COVID-19 health crisis, Jakarta's weakened economy, and the social dynamics that follows. Sri participated in the competency test for the position and came in second, with South Jakarta mayor Marullah Matali scoring the highest. Marullah eventually replaced Sri Haryati as provincial secretary on 18 January 2021.

In August 2021, Sri was questioned by Indonesia's Corruption Eradication Commission regarding the budgeting process linked to a land procurement corruption case in Munjul, East Jakarta. Sri had been summoned by the commission for the occasion on 31 May, but was absent for the hearing, as she tested positive for COVID-19 despite having received her second vaccine dose in April that year.

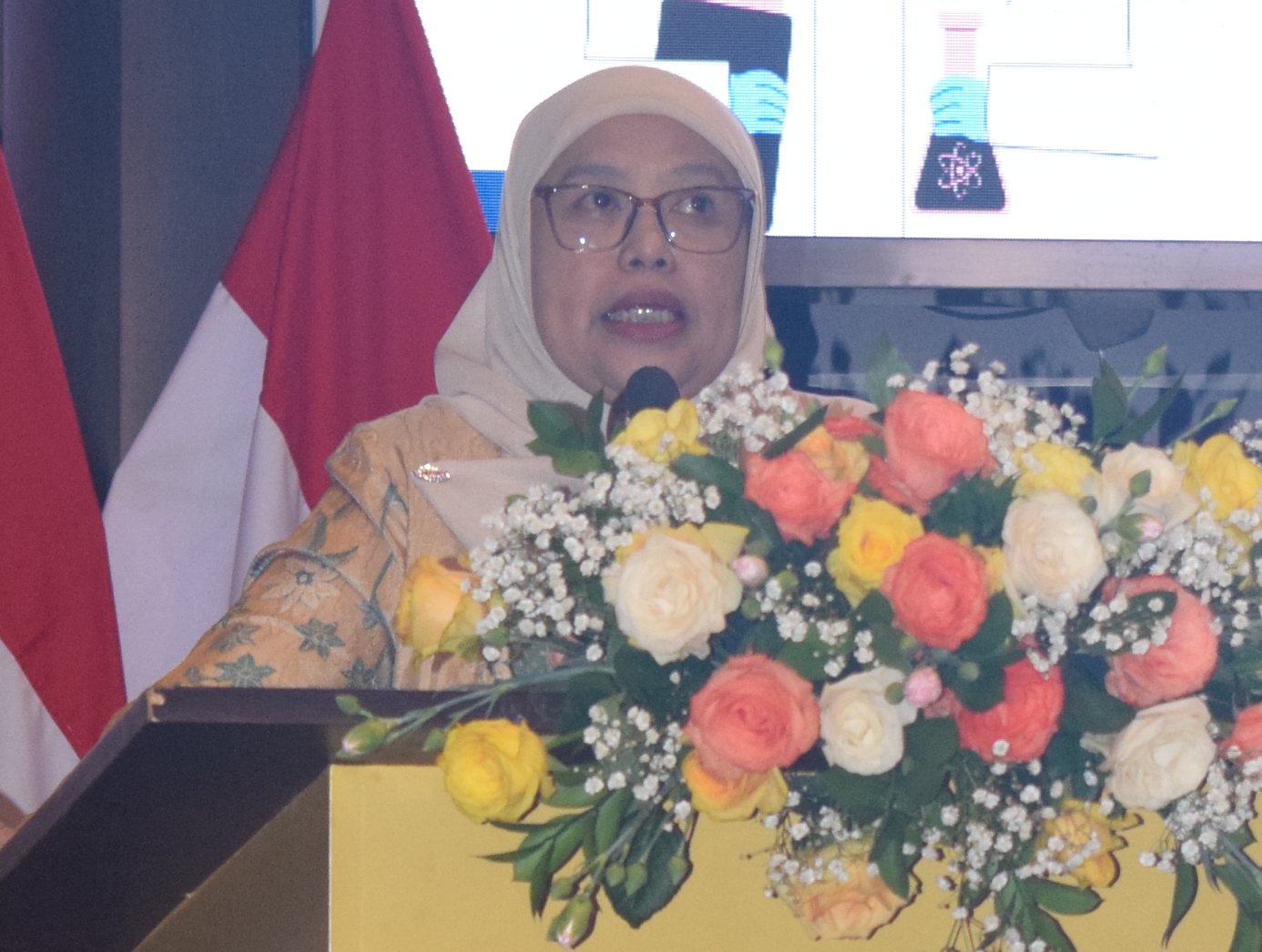
Sri Haryati as director general delivering a speech.

On 20 January 2025, Sri became the director general of urban housing in the newly established Ministry of Housing and Residential Area.

== Personal life ==
Sri is married and has two children. She has a hobby of swimming.
