= Ida Mahmudah =

Indonesian politician

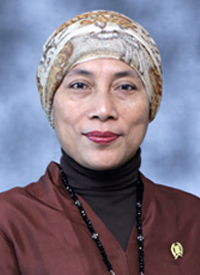
- Official portrait, 2019

Member of Jakarta Regional House of Representatives
- Incumbent
- Assumed office 25 August 2009

Personal details
- Born: 3 August 1967 (age 57); Semarang, Central Java, Indonesia
- Political party: PDI-P

Ida Mahmudah (born 3 August 1967) is an Indonesian politician of the Indonesian Democratic Party of Struggle who currently serves as a member of the Jakarta Regional House of Representatives. She has served in the legislature for three terms, starting in 2009.

== Biography ==
Ida was born in Semarang, Central Java on 3 August 1967. She was first elected into Jakarta's legislature after the 2009 election, when she won 7,809 votes. She was sworn in on 25 August 2009. In her first term in the legislature, she chaired one of its commissions. She was reelected in the 2014 election. After her second reelection in 2019, she was considered by her party as a candidate for the legislature's speaker alongside Gembong Warsono and Prasetyo Edi Marsudi. Prasetyo eventually was appointed.

In February 2023, Ida proposed that the Kemayoran Athletes Village – a complex developed by the central government initially for the 2018 Asian Games and later repurposed to house patients during the COVID-19 pandemic until December 2022 – be taken over by the Jakarta Government in order to repurpose it into low-cost housing and a children's hospital. Ida remarked that the complex "had plenty of Kuntilanak". She has also opposed the holding of Formula E races in Jakarta.
