= Veronica Tan =

Indonesian entrepreneur and politician

- 林雪莉
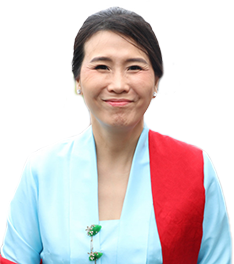
- Official portrait, 2024

Deputy Ministry of Women Empowerment and Child Protection of Indonesia
- Incumbent
- Assumed office 21 October 2024
- President: Prabowo Subianto
- Minister: Arifah Choiri Fauzi
- Preceded by: Lasiyah Soetanto

Head of TP-PKK of Jakarta
- In office 4 December 2014 – 25 July 2017
- President: Joko Widodo
- Governor: Basuki Tjahaja Purnama; Djarot Saiful Hidayat
- Preceded by: Iriana
- Succeeded by: Happy Farida

First Lady of Jakarta
- In office 16 October 2014 – 9 May 2017
- President: Joko Widodo
- Governor: Basuki Tjahaja Purnama
- Preceded by: Iriana
- Succeeded by: Happy Farida

Personal details
- Born: Veronica Tan; 4 December 1977 (age 48) Medan, North Sumatra, Indonesia
- Party: Perindo Party
- Spouse: Basuki Tjahaja Purnama (m. 1997; div. 2018)
- Children: 3
- Education: Pelita Harapan University
- Occupation: Entrepreneur

Veronica Tan or Veronica Lim (Note: Tan, her mother's surname, is used on official documents instead of Lim, her father's surname, because her parents did not register their marriage to the government resulting in lack of marriage certificate) (Chinese: 林雪莉; pinyin: Lín Xuělì, Pe̍h-ōe-jī: Lîm Soat-lī, born 4 December 1977) is an Indonesian politician and entrepreneur who is currently serving as the Deputy Ministry of Women Empowerment and Child Protection of Indonesia.

She previously served as the chairperson of the Indonesian Cancer Foundation (YKI) DKI Jakarta branch and head of the Family Empowerment and Welfare Movement Team (TP-PKK) of DKI Jakarta.

As an entrepreneur, she founded a beef importing company and also one of the founders of a home care service provider.

== Personal life ==
After graduating from high school, she moved to Jakarta and majored in architecture at Pelita Harapan University. She met Basuki Tjahaja Purnama at a church and married him on 6 September 1997, at the age of 19. The couple had three children, Nicolas Sean, Nathania and Daud Albeneer.

She accompanied Basuki when he was inaugurated as Governor of Jakarta.

When Basuki was detained for blasphemy, she read a letter written by Basuki to his supporters.

On 5 January 2018, Basuki reportedly filed for divorce from Veronica.

A court granted Basuki's petition for divorce in early April 2018, and gave him custody of the couple's two younger children. Their first child, Nicholas Sean Purnama, was entitled to determine his own custody status due to being of age.
