= Arifah Choiri Fauzi =

Indonesian politician

Arifatul Choiri Fauzi
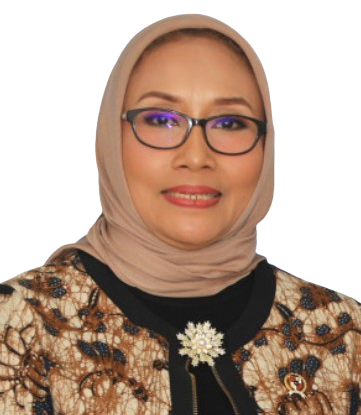

Ministry of Women Empowerment and Child Protection of Indonesia
- Incumbent
- Assumed office 21 October 2024
- President: Prabowo Subianto
- Deputy: Veronica Tan
- Preceded by: I Gusti Ayu Bintang Darmawati

Personal details
- Born: 28 July 1969 (age 57) Madura
- Occupation: Chairwoman of Muslimat NU

Arifatul Choiri Fauzi is an Indonesian politician who serves as Chairwoman of Muslimat NU (the women's wing of Nahdlatul Ulama). Arifah herself is active in religious and political organizations, she is a member of the Information and Communication Commission MUI. In the 2024 Indonesian presidential election, Arifah became Deputy Chair of the Prabowo-Gibran National Campaign Team which is part of the Advanced Indonesia Coalition.

Arifah became the Ministry of Women Empowerment and Child Protection of Indonesia in the Red White Cabinet after she met President-elect Prabowo Subianto in Kertanegara. He and 49 other people came to Prabowo's residence on October 14, 2024.
