= Inotek Foundation =

Non-profit organization based in Jakarta, Indonesia

INOTEK Foundation
- Founded: 2008
- Founder: Sandiaga Salahudin Uno; Arief Surowidjojo
- Type: Non-Profit Organization
- Location: Jl Jenggala II No. 9, Kebayoran Baru, Jakarta 12110 Indonesia
- Region served: Worldwide
- Product: Technology Innovations
- Key people: Sandiaga Salahudin Uno; Arief Surowidjojo; Ilham Akbar Habibie
- Website: http://www.inotek.org/

The INOTEK Foundation (also stylized as Inotek) is a not-for-profit organization based in Jakarta, Indonesia. It was founded in 2008 by Indonesians Sandiaga Salahudin Uno and Arief Surowidjojo. Inotek promotes the development of technologies for sustainable economic growth by providing mentorship and networking opportunities to selected entrepreneurs.

== Aims ==
Inotek aims to promote sustainable economic growth in Indonesia, working with small and medium-sized businesses in the technology and business-to-business sectors. In order to accomplish this, Inotek works to identify individuals and companies with aligned goals in order to provide mentorship and networking opportunities.

== Alumni ==
- Professor Ari Purbayanto: the developer of Suritech, a machine that separates the bones and meat of small by-catch fish.
- Agus Cahyadi: developed octopus fishing gear.
- Prof. M. Nurhuda: the developer of UB Komor, a biomass cookstove through his company CV Kreasi Daya Mandiri
- Hadi Apriliawan and their team: the developers of SULIS, a cost-effective method of milk pasteurization

== Programs and projects ==
- Mentoring supported by The Lemelson Foundation
- IDDGIS (Indonesian Demand-Driven Green Innovation Subprogram) supported by World Bank
- EEP Indonesia (Energy and Environment Partnership with Indonesia) supported by the Ministry for Foreign Affairs of Finland and implemented in cooperation with the Directorate General of New, Renewable Energy and Energy Conservation of the Ministry of Energy and Mineral Resources of Indonesia
