= Sylviana Murni =

Indonesian politician

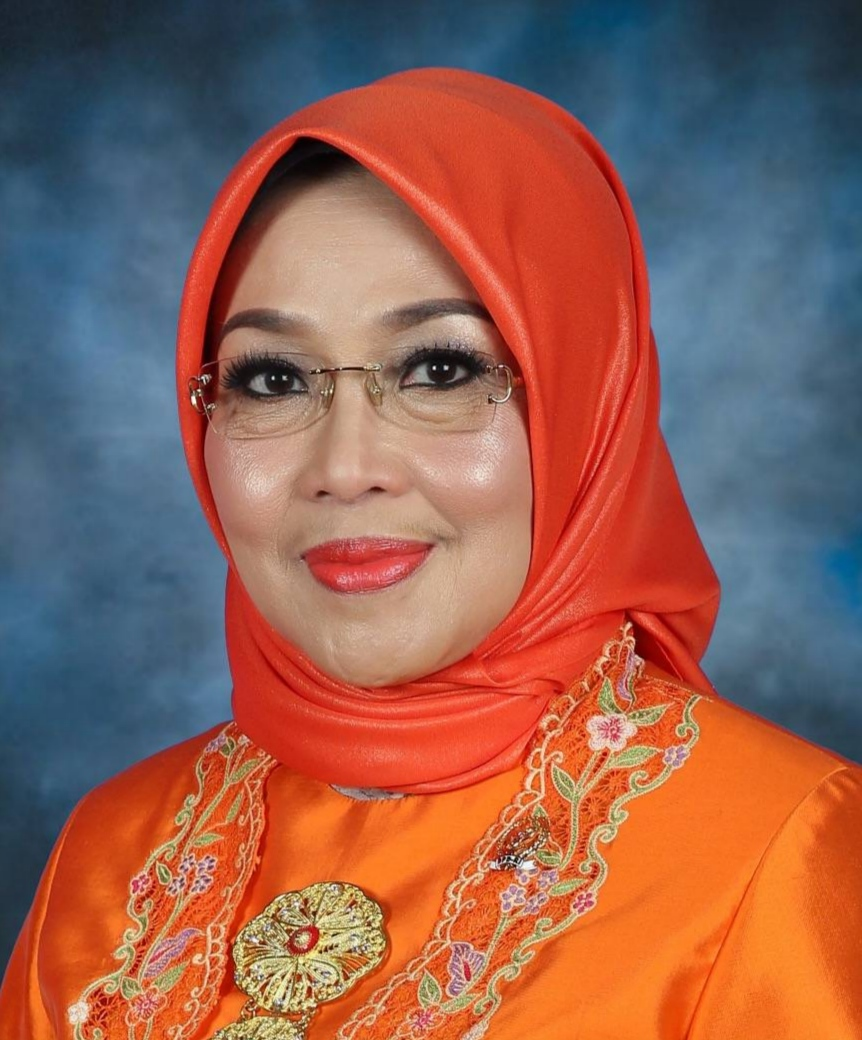

Senator from Jakarta
- In office 1 October 2019 – 1 October 2024

Mayor of Central Jakarta
- In office 1 April 2008 – 4 November 2010
- Governor: Fauzi Bowo
- Preceded by: Muhayat
- Succeeded by: Saefullah

Personal details
- Born: 11 October 1958 (age 66); Jakarta, Indonesia
- Political party: Demokrat

Sylviana Murni (born 11 October 1958) is an Indonesian politician and bureaucrat who served as a member of the Regional Representative Council representing Jakarta between 2019 and 2024. She has previously served as mayor of Central Jakarta between 2008 and 2010 and later participated as a running mate in the 2017 Jakarta gubernatorial election.

== Early life ==
Sylviana was born in Jakarta on 11 October 1958. She studied law at Jayabaya University, and later economics at the University of Indonesia (masters) and Jakarta State University (doctorate). In 1981, during her final semester at Jayabaya, she participated in the Mr. & Miss Jakarta (Abang None Jakarta) contest as her friend had signed her up, and she won first place.

== Career ==
She began working for Jakarta's provincial government in 1985. She was promoted multiple times, and by 1997 she was head of the culture and mental coaching in Jakarta's educational department. Shortly before the fall of Suharto, Sylviana also served in the Jakarta Regional People's Representative Council between 1997 and 1999. After the stint as a legislator, she returned to her bureaucratic work, being appointed head of the social development department until 2001, head of the population and civil registration office until 2004, and head of elementary education until 2008.

On 1 April 2008, she was appointed as the mayor of Central Jakarta. She became the first woman to serve as mayor of Jakarta's five administrative cities. Saefullah was appointed to replace her on 4 November 2010. She was later proposed as a potential candidate for regional secretary (the highest bureaucratic office in Jakarta) in 2014, but was passed over in favor of Saefullah, and Sylviana was instead appointed governor's deputy for tourism and culture.

In order to run as Agus Harimurti Yudhoyono's running mate in the 2017 Jakarta gubernatorial election, she resigned from her civil servant job in September 2016. The pair was defeated in the first round of the election, and Sylviana instead ran as a Jakarta senatorial candidate for the 2019 legislative election. She was elected into the Regional Representative Council with 455,182 votes, ranking fourth in Jakarta out of an allotment of four senators. She unsuccessfully ran for a second term in the 2024 election, placing fifth in Jakarta with only four senators elected.
