= List of ministers of women empowerment and children protection (Indonesia) =

Minister of Women Empowerment and Children Protection of Indonesia

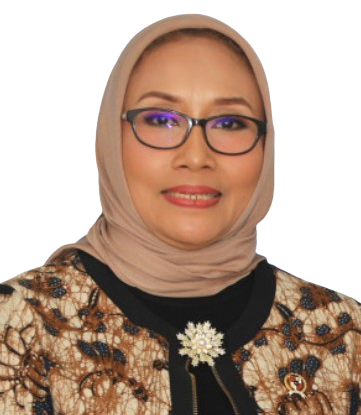
- Incumbent; Arifah Choiri Fauzi since 21 October 2024
- Member of: Cabinet of Indonesia
- Appointer: President of Indonesia
- Inaugural holder: Lasiyah Soetanto
- Formation: March 19, 1983

The following is a list of the Minister of Women Empowerment and Children Protection of Indonesia

#	Photo	Minister	Party	Cabinet	Took office	Left office	Note
1		Lasiyah Soetanto	Golkar	Development IV	19 March 1983	2 November 1987	
2		Sulaskin Murpratomo	Golkar	Development IV	20 November 1987	17 March 1993	
2		Sulaskin Murpratomo	Golkar	Development V	20 November 1987	17 March 1993	
3		Mien Sugandhi	Golkar	Development VI	17 March 1993	16 March 1998	
4		Tuty Alawiyah	Golkar	Development VII	14 March 1998	20 October 1999	
4		Tuty Alawiyah	Golkar	Development Reform	14 March 1998	20 October 1999	
5		Khofifah Indar Parawansa	PKB	National Unity	29 October 1999	23 July 2001	
6		Sri Redjeki Sumarjoto	Golkar	Mutual Assistance	10 August 2001	20 October 2004	
7		Meutia Hatta	Independent	United Indonesia I	21 October 2004	20 October 2009	
7		Meutia Hatta	PKPI	United Indonesia I	21 October 2004	20 October 2009	
8		Linda Amalia Sari	Independent	United Indonesia II	22 October 2009	20 October 2014	
9		Yohana Yembise	Independent	Working	27 October 2014	20 October 2019	
10		I Gusti Ayu Bintang Darmawati	PDIP	Onward Indonesia	23 October 2019	20 October 2024	
11		Arifah Choiri Fauzi	Independent	Red and White	21 October 2024	incumbent	
