= Ministry of Women Empowerment and Children Protection =

Government ministry of Indonesia

- Kementerian Pemberdayaan Perempuan dan Perlindungan Anak
- Logo of the Ministry of Women Empowerment and Children Protection

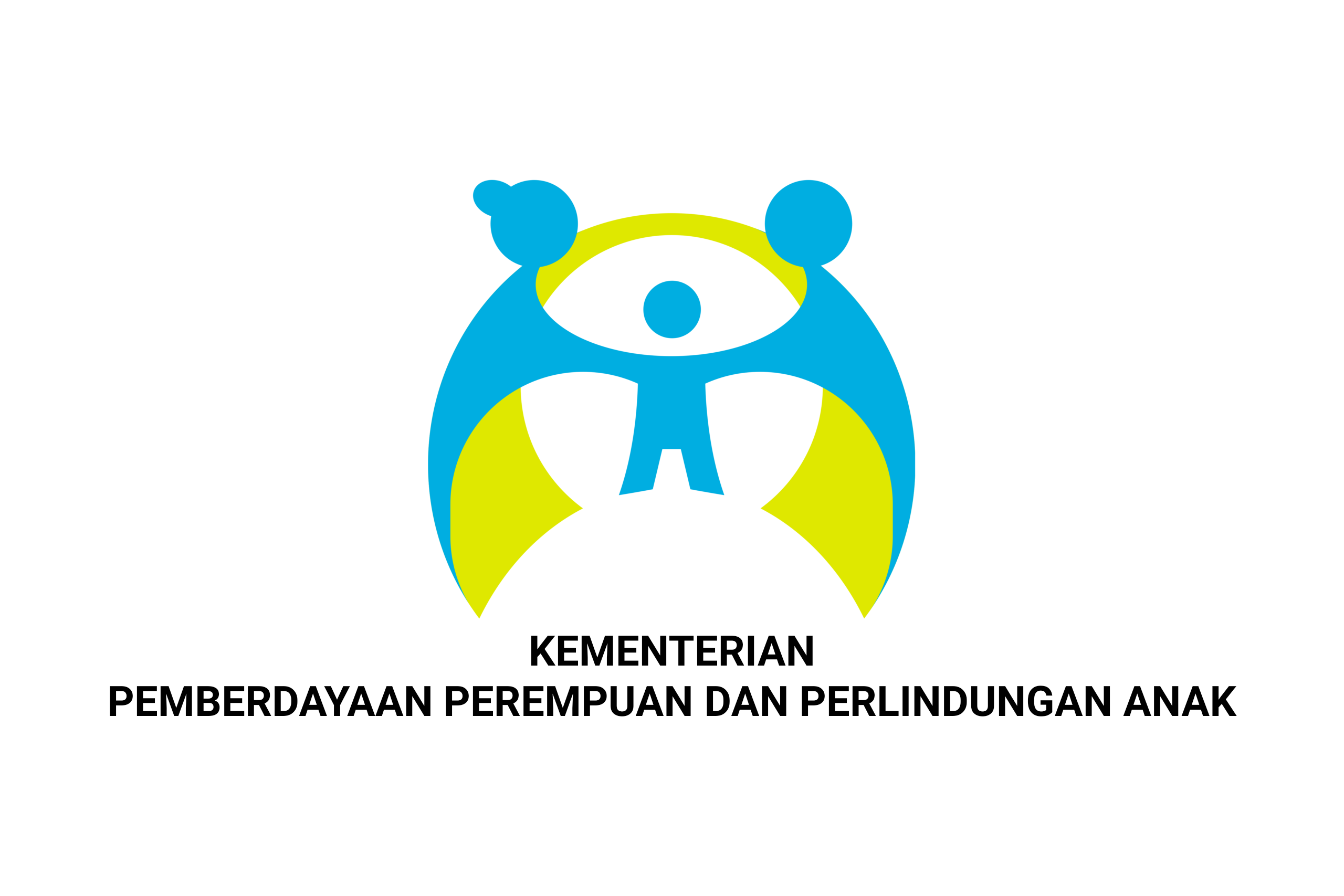
- Flag of the Ministry of Women Empowerment and Children Protection

Ministry overview
- Formed: 1978
- Jurisdiction: Government of Indonesia
- Headquarters: Jalan Medan Merdeka Barat No. 15 Jakarta Pusat 10110 Jakarta, Indonesia
- Minister responsible: Arifah Choiri Fauzi, Minister of Women Empowerment and Children Protection
- Deputy Minister responsible: Veronica Tan, Deputy Minister of Women Empowerment and Children Protection
- Website: www.kemenpppa.go.id

The Ministry of Women Empowerment and Children Protection (MoWECP) (Indonesian: Kementerian Pemberdayaan Perempuan dan Perlindungan Anak, abbreviated Kemen PPPA) of the Republic of Indonesia, formerly the Ministry of Women's Empowerment of the Republic of Indonesia, is a government ministry responsible for the rights and welfare of women and children of Indonesia. Since 21 October 2024, Arifah Choiri Fauzi has headed the ministry.

== History ==
The Ministry of Women Empowerment and Children Protection (MoWECP) was founded in 1978. It was initially called the Ministry of Women. Its first name change was to Ministry of Women's Affairs in 1998. In 1999, its name was changed again to Ministry of Women's Empowerment. In 2009, the name was finally changed to what it is called today, Ministry of Women Empowerment and Children Protection.

== Deputy Ministers ==
	Took office	Left office	Minister	Ministry
1st	21 October 2024	Current	Veronica Tan	Ministry of Women Empowerment and Children Protection

== Organization Structure ==
Based on Presidential Decree No. 7/2023 and Ministry of Women Empowerment and Children Protection Decree No. 5/2023, the ministry consisted of:

- Office of the Minister of Women Empowerment and Children Protection
- Office of the Minister of Women Empowerment and Children Protection Secretariat
  - Bureau of Data and Information
  - Bureau of Planning and Finance
  - Bureau of Law Affairs and Public Relations
  - Bureau of Human Resources and General Affairs
- Deputy I (Gender Equality)
  - Assistant Deputyship for Gender Equality Policies
  - Assistant Deputyship for Gender Equality Mainstreaming in Economics
  - Assistant Deputyship for Gender Equality Mainstreaming in Politics and Law
  - Assistant Deputyship for Gender Equality Mainstreaming in Social and Culture
- Deputy II (Child Rights Fulfillment)
  - Assistant Deputyship for Children Rights Fulfillment Policies
  - Assistant Deputyship for Civil Rights Fulfillment, Information, and Child Participation
  - Assistant Deputyship for Children Rights Fulfillment for Nurturement and Environmental Needs
  - Assistant Deputyship for Children Rights Fulfillment for Healthcare and Education
- Deputy III (Women Rights Protection)
  - Assistant Deputyship for Women Rights Protection Policies
  - Assistant Deputyship for Working Women Rights Fulfillment and Countering Human Trafficking Crimes
  - Assistant Deputyship for Protection for Domestic and Vulnerable Housewife
  - Assistant Deputyship for Servicing of Victims of Violence Against Women
- Deputy IV (Children Protection)
  - Assistant Deputyship for Children Protection Policies
  - Assistant Deputyship for Special Needs Children Protection
  - Assistant Deputyship for Children Protection from Violence
  - Assistant Deputyship for Servicing of Special Needs Children
- Office of the General Inspectorate
- Expert Staffs
  - Expert Staffs on Participation and Strategic Environment for Women Empowerment and Children
  - Expert Staffs on Institutional Relations
  - Expert Staffs on Law and Human Rights
