= Gembong Warsono =

Indonesian politician (1963–2023)

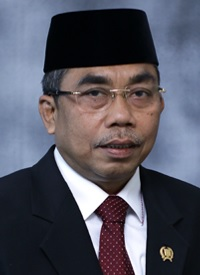

Member of Jakarta Regional House of Representatives
- In office 25 August 2014 – 14 October 2023
- Succeeded by: Simon A.M. Sitorus

Personal details
- Born: 8 June 1963 Wonogiri, Central Java, Indonesia
- Died: 14 October 2023 (aged 60) Jakarta, Indonesia
- Party: PDI-P

Gembong Warsono (8 June 1963 – 14 October 2023) was an Indonesian politician of the Indonesian Democratic Party of Struggle. He was elected twice into the Jakarta Regional House of Representatives, serving as a member from 2014 until his death in 2023. He had led his party's faction in the legislature and was a critic of governor Anies Baswedan.

== Early life and family ==
Gembong was born in Wonogiri Regency on 8 June 1963. He obtained a degree in management from Muhammadiyah Hamka University. He married Asih Purwanti and had four children.

== Career ==
According to Gembong, he was already a member of the Indonesian Democratic Party (PDI) during the 27 July 1996 incident as a party official in the Kebayoran Lama district. Following PDI's split, he joined the Indonesian Democratic Party of Struggle (PDI-P). His first electoral attempt was in the 1999 Indonesian legislative election, when he ran unsuccessfully for a legislator seat in the Jakarta Regional House of Representatives. In 2000, he became secretary of the party's South Jakarta branch, and in 2003 he was elected into South Jakarta's city council (an advisory body). Gembong once more ran and failed to secure a seat in South Jakarta in the 2004 legislative election, when he placed third among PDI-P candidates in his South Jakarta constituency while the party won two seats. For his third electoral attempt in 2009, he was ordered by the party's provincial leadership to run in West Jakarta instead and once more failed to secure a seat.

Warsono became the chairman of PDI-P's South Jakarta branch in 2010, and he secured a legislator seat in his fourth attempt in the 2014 election. Sworn in on 25 August 2014, Gembong had become leader of PDI-P's faction in the legislature by 2017. He won 17,739 votes in the 2019 election, retained his seat and his position as faction leader of PDI-P.

=== Positions ===
During the governorship of Anies Baswedan, Gembong was a frequent critic of Baswedan's policies. Gembong attacked Baswedan's policies which involved firms owned by the provincial government, which he referred to as "policy smuggling". He had also attacked Baswedan over a 2019 plan to permit street vendors to operate on Jakarta's sidewalks, and in 2018 over the use of dumpsters imported from Germany over local products. However, he praised Baswedan's efforts in integrating Jakarta's public transport systems. He further questioned Jakarta's hosting of the Formula E motorsport championships, citing poor ticket sales and low interest from sponsors.

== Death ==
Gembong died at Pertamina Central Hospital in South Jakarta, on 14 October 2023, at age 60. He was buried on the same day at the Tanah Kusir Cemetery.
