= Djarot Saiful Hidayat =

Indonesian politician (born 1962)

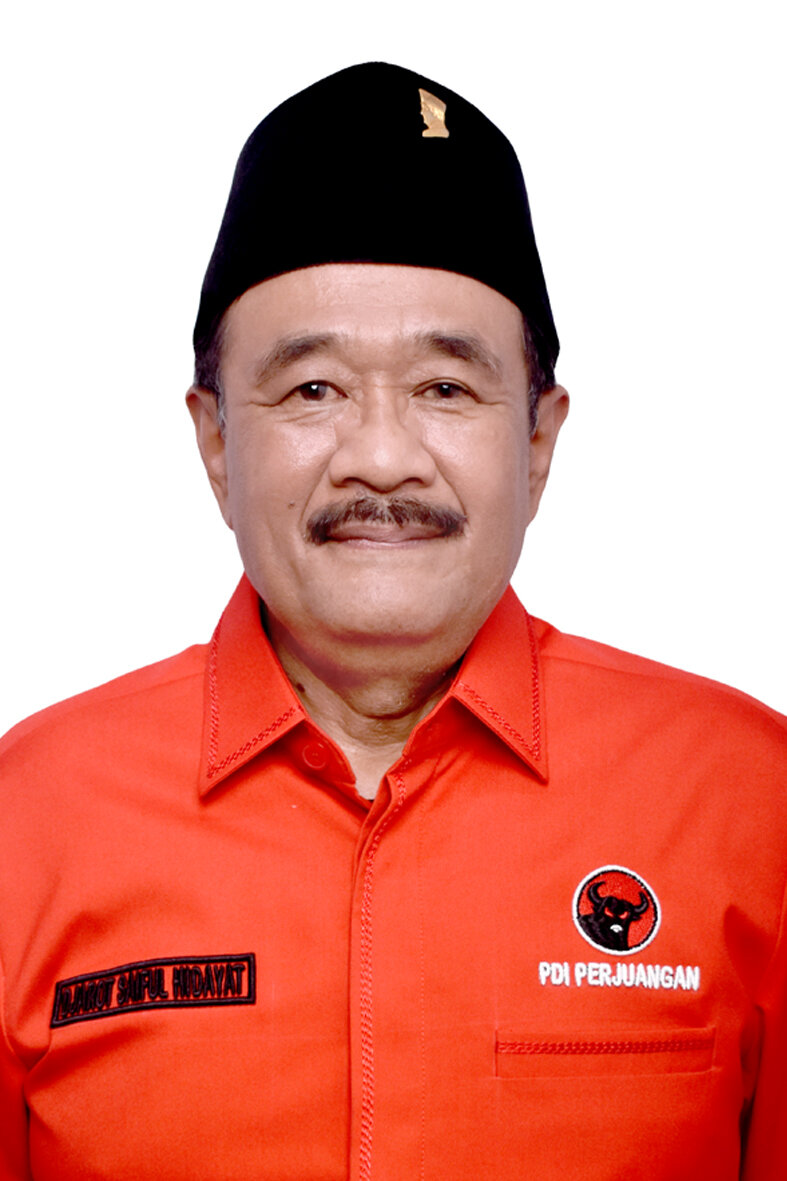
- Electoral portrait, 2024

13th Governor of Jakarta
- In office 15 June 2017 – 15 October 2017; Acting: 9 May – 15 June 2017
- Vice Governor: Vacant
- Preceded by: Basuki Tjahaja Purnama
- Succeeded by: Saefullah (interim); Anies Baswedan

13th Vice Governor of Jakarta
- In office 17 December 2014 – 9 May 2017
- Governor: Basuki Tjahaja Purnama
- Preceded by: Basuki Tjahaja Purnama
- Succeeded by: Sandiaga Uno

Member of House of Representatives
- In office 1 October 2019 – 1 October 2024
- Succeeded by: Bane Raja Manalu
- Constituency: North Sumatra III
- In office 1 October 2014 – 16 December 2014
- Succeeded by: Arteria Dahlan
- Constituency: East Java VI

21st Mayor of Blitar
- In office 3 May 2000 – 3 August 2010
- Deputy: Mohammad Zainuddin (2000–2005); Endro Hernowo (2005–2010)
- Preceded by: Istijono Soenarto
- Succeeded by: Samanhudi Anwar

Member of the East Java Regional House of Representatives
- In office 1999–2004

Personal details
- Born: 6 July 1962 (age 64) Magelang, Indonesia
- Party: PDI-P
- Spouse: Happy Farida
- Children: 3
- Education: Brawijaya University; Gadjah Mada University

Djarot Saiful Hidayat (born 6 July 1962) is an Indonesian politician who is currently a member of the People's Representative Council. He was the governor of Jakarta, in office between 15 June and 15 October 2017 after being acting governor since 9 May. He replaced his predecessor Basuki Tjahaja Purnama (commonly known as Ahok) when the latter was found guilty of blasphemy against Islam. He was appointed by Basuki as Deputy Governor in 2014 to fill the gap left by the election of Joko Widodo as president.

Member of PDI-P, his political career began as a member of East Java's Regional Parliament between 1999 and 2000, before he was elected as Mayor of Blitar where he served a 10-year tenure. He was later elected into the People's Representative Council before his move into the capital's governance.

== Personal life ==
=== Early life ===
Born as Saiful Hidayat in Magelang, Central Java on 6 July 1962 as son of an army veteran, he received his forename Djarot from a merchant in a traditional market in his hometown.

=== Education ===
He earned his bachelor's degree in 1986 from Brawijaya University in Malang, majoring in administrative science. He continued to Gadjah Mada University for his master's degree in Political Science and graduated in 1991. Before he entered politics, he was a lecturer in the 17 August 1945 University in Surabaya.

=== Family ===
Djarot married Happy Farida in 1999 and has 3 children. Happy was later elected as a member of the Regional Representative Council in 2024.

== Political career ==
After the fall of Suharto, he joined PDI-P and successfully ran for a seat in the province's Regional People's Representative Council in 1999. During his term, he was appointed as chairman of Commission A (on government).

=== Mayor of Blitar (2000–2010) ===
After being appointed Mayor in 2000, he started his mayorship by culling nearly 300 excess government positions from the city of 100,000. After his re-election in the first regional elections of the country in 2005, Djarot's governance of Blitar earned 3 consecutive Adipura (cleanliness award) awards between 2006 and 2008. In his term, he focused on organizing the local street vendors and traditional markets instead of more modern shopping centres. In addition, he provided aid of Rp 4-7 million (US$400–700) to citizens with underrenovated housing. The city's government was also awarded first place in the implementation of an e-government and Citizen's Charter on health. Djarot additionally encouraged the construction of Sukarno statues in the city, leveraging Sukarno's burial site there in order to boost tourism. He did not run in the 2010 elections due to a constitutional term limit.

During his tenure as mayor, he first met Ahok in 2006, when the latter was still regent of East Belitung.

=== Move to Jakarta ===
In the 2012 Jakarta elections which pitted later-president Joko Widodo (Jokowi) against then-governor Fauzi Bowo, Djarot was the chief adviser of Jokowi's campaign team. He ran for a position in the People's Representative Council in 2014, through the East Java 6 election district which included Blitar and Kediri (city and regency) in addition to Tulungagung Regency. He secured 69,053 votes - the fourth highest in the district out of a quota of nine - and won a seat.

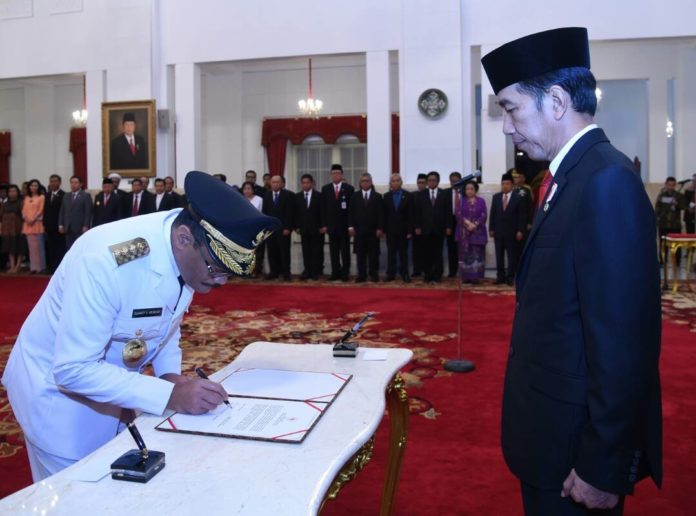
President and former Jakartan Governor Joko Widodo with Djarot during the latter's swearing in following Basuki's removal from office.

Months after his election into the legislative body, Jokowi defeated Prabowo Subianto to become the 7th President of Indonesia. Consequentially, Basuki was elevated to the rank of governor and left his former position of vice governor vacant. As PDI-P sought for a replacement, his name was brought up along with that of Boy Sadikin (eldest son of late former governor Ali Sadikin). In the end, Ahok selected Djarot as his deputy and he was put into office on 17 December. According to Basuki, he had set his eyes on the former mayor since before he officially became Vice Governor. Upon his appointment, Djarot immediately started conducting highly publicized visits known popularly as blusukan often done by Jokowi during his term but somewhat less commonly for Basuki.

In 2017, the pair ran for Jakartan governorship until 2022 against both former Minister of Education Anies Baswedan and Agus Harimurti Yudhoyono, son of former president Susilo Bambang Yudhoyono. After failing to secure a majority in the first elections while placing first, the pair was defeated by Baswedan who won 57.96 percent of the vote in the run-off elections.

Around the same time, Ahok had been accused of blasphemy against Islam during an initially obscure visit to Kepulauan Seribu Regency. The case gained widespread national and international attention, with a series of mass protests calling for the governor's prosecution. During the court proceedings, he was non-activated, with Djarot serving as acting governor in his place. Despite accusations of political motivation behind the case and international clemency requests, Basuki was found guilty and sentenced to 2 years in jail after a highly publicized trial. Djarot later offered to become a guarantor for his running mate's conditional release.

After Basuki withdrew his appeal to the Supreme Court and resigned from governorship, Djarot was officially inaugurated by Joko Widodo in the State Palace as the governor of Jakarta on June 15 after serving as acting Governor for about a month. He became the third governor to serve in the five-year period between 2012 and 2017, after Joko Widodo and Basuki Tjahaja Purnama.

=== As governor (2017) ===
Following the prohibition of Hizbut Tahrir Indonesia, the Indonesian branch of Hizb ut-Tahrir, he proposed to revoke the citizenship of Jakartan civil servants affiliated with the organization. He was succeeded by governor-elect Anies Baswedan on 16 October 2017.

=== Post-governorship ===
After his tenure ended, Djarot was assigned by his party to lead the East Kalimantan office until the 2018 local elections. In January 2018, PDI-P selected him as candidate for the governorship of North Sumatra, with Sihar Sitorus as running mate. He would however lose to Edy Rahmayadi and Musa Rajekshah.

Following his defeat, he ran in the 2019 legislative election, competing for a seat in the People's Representative Council from North Sumatra 3rd electoral district and got elected. He ran for a second term in the district in the 2024 election, but was not elected.

After that, he served as the Head of Ideology and Cadre Formation at the Central Executive Board of the Indonesian Democratic Party of Struggle.

Political offices
Preceded by Basuki Tjahaja Purnama	Governor of Jakarta; 2017	Succeeded by Saefullah (interim); Anies Baswedan
