= Sandiaga Uno =

Indonesian businessman and politician (born 1969)

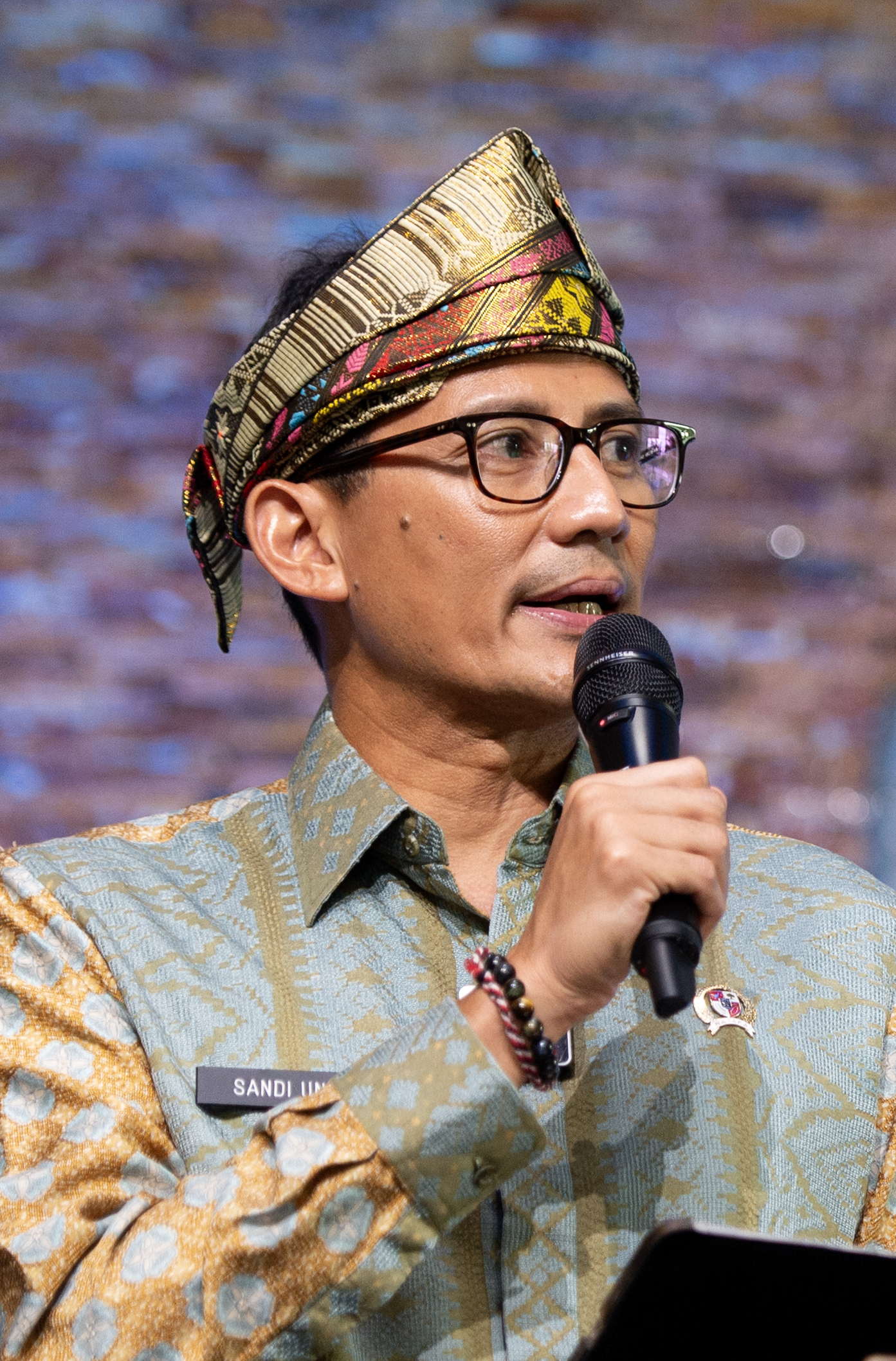
- Uno in 2024

11th Minister of Tourism and Creative Economy
- In office 23 December 2020 – 20 October 2024
- President: Joko Widodo
- Deputy: Angela Tanoesoedibjo
- Preceded by: Wishnutama
- Succeeded by: Widiyanti Putri (as Minister of Tourism); Teuku Riefky Harsya (as Minister of Creative Economy)

14th Vice Governor of Jakarta
- In office 16 October 2017 – 18 September 2018
- Governor: Anies Baswedan
- Preceded by: Djarot Saiful Hidayat
- Succeeded by: Ahmad Riza Patria

Personal details
- Born: 28 June 1969 (age 57) Rumbai, Pekanbaru, Riau, Indonesia
- Party: PPP (since 2023)
- Other political affiliations: Gerindra (2015–2018, 2019–2023); Independent (2018–2019)
- Spouse: Nur Asia (m. 1996)
- Children: 3
- Education: Wichita State University (BBA); George Washington University (MBA); Pelita Harapan University (PhD)
- Occupation: Businessman; Investor; Politician

Sandiaga Salahuddin Uno (born 28 June 1969) is an Indonesian businessman, investor and politician of the United Development Party who served as Minister of Tourism and Creative Economy from 2020 to 2024. He previously served as the 14th Deputy Governor of Jakarta, elected along with Anies Baswedan in the 2017 Jakarta gubernatorial election after defeating incumbent pair Basuki Tjahaja Purnama and Djarot Saiful Hidayat. He resigned from the office of deputy governor to run as Prabowo Subianto's running mate for the 2019 Indonesian presidential election.

A graduate of George Washington University, Sandiaga worked for several companies and rose in rank before founding his own business, which led him to become one of the richest people in Indonesia. In 2015, he resigned from his companies to join Gerindra. Upon his candidacy as vice president, he also renounced his membership in Prabowo's Gerindra as part of the deal with coalition parties.

== Business career ==
Sandiaga Uno graduated from Wichita State University in 1990 and from George Washington University with an MBA in 1992, paid by William Soerjadjaja, because his mother personally knew the Astra International group founder. He began his career with Summa Bank in 1990. In 1994, he joined MP Group Holding Limited as an investment manager. The following year, he began working for NTI Resources Ltd in Canada and worked as an Executive Vice President in the company. The 1997 financial crisis hit NTI Resources Ltd hard and caused it to go into administration, leaving him unemployed.

In 1997, he co-founded PT. Recapital Advisors with his high school friend, Rosan Roeslani. the following year, he co-founded Saratoga Capital with Edwin Soeryadjaya, son of William Soerjadjaja. Both businesses continue to flourish today. Listed as 29th richest man in Indonesia according to Forbes magazine in 2009, he continued to grow his businesses, buying a controlling (51%) stake in Mandala Airlines in May 2011. He was listed as 47th richest man in Indonesia according to Forbes in 2013.

In 2016, his name appeared on the list of Panama Papers, although he denies he evaded taxes or broke the law.

== Political career ==
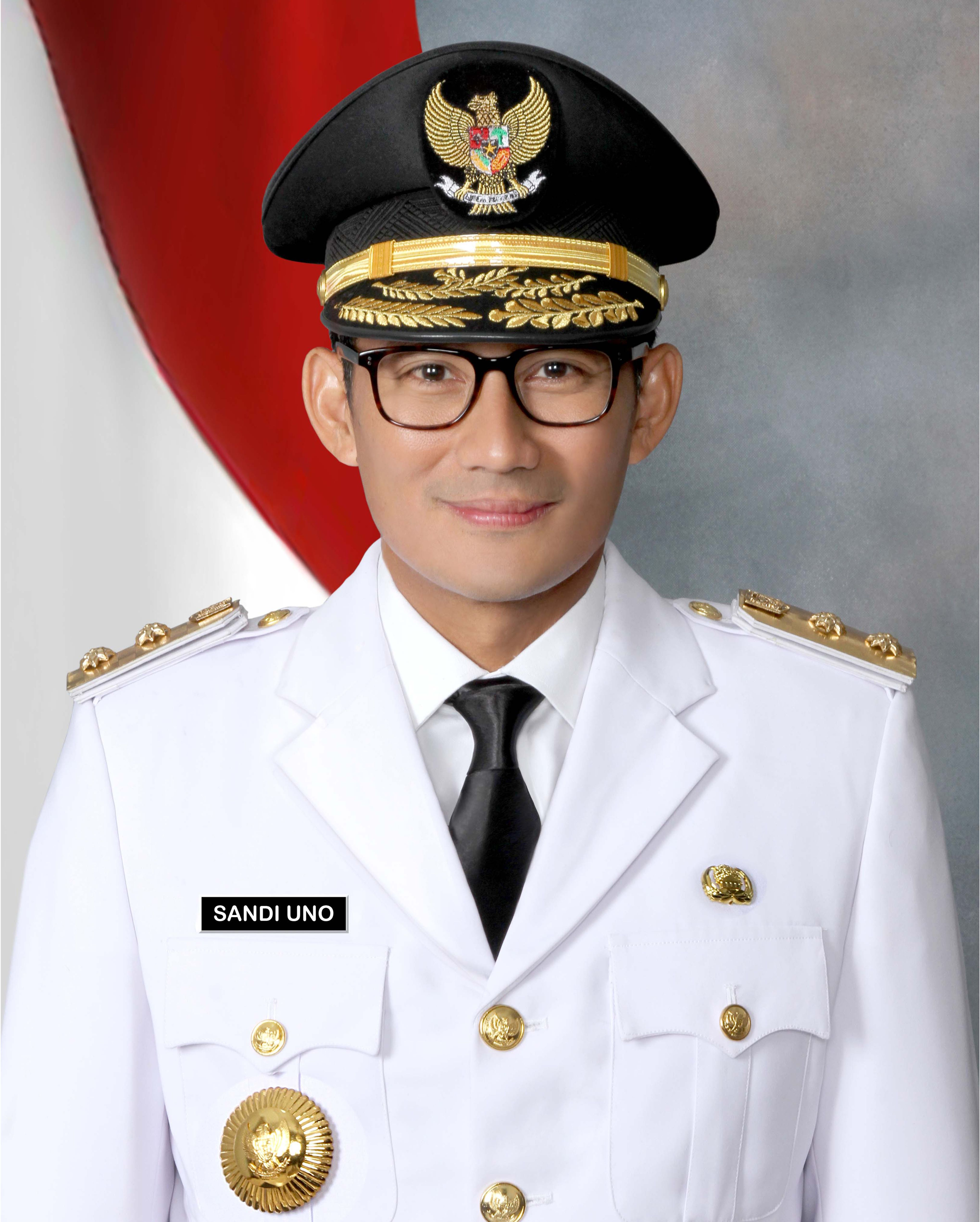
Uno as Vice Governor of Jakarta, 2017.

He decided to leave the business world, entering politics in mid-2015. In the period from April to July 2015, he officially resigned from various positions in 16 subsidiaries of Saratoga and Recapital. Joining the Gerindra party as vice chairman of the board of supervisors, he was catapulted to the second highest office after Prabowo. His name began to be considered by Gerindra to be nominated in the 2017 Jakarta gubernatorial election.

Late in 2015, several volunteer community support groups began to emerge, including "Sahabat Sandiaga Uno" (Friends of Sandiaga Uno or SSU). He began making visits to various locations within Jakarta. In early 2016, Sandiaga Uno, with assistance of his supporters, began to intensify visits to various locations in Jakarta. Performing visits to up to 7 different locations a day, for the 6-month period from February to August 2016. The rumour of his candidacy intensified, as news leaked of the desire of 7 political parties to form a grand coalition in August 2016.

This desire was not realised following the withdrawal the ruling PDI-P party, which threw its weight behind incumbent governor Ahok, along with Golkar, Hanura and Nasdem. The Democratic Party, PAN, PKB and PPP then announced it planned to nominate Agus Harimurti Yudhoyono (son of former President Susilo Bambang Yudhoyono) for the position.

The remaining parties, Gerindra and PKS, agreed to remain in the coalition, selecting former Education Minister Anies Baswedan as their candidate, and Sandiaga Uno as his running mate. Sandiaga said, he had suggested Baswedan to Prabowo because he felt that Baswedan would be more suitable for the position.

Following victory in the election, which an editorial described as "the most polarizing and most divisive the nation has ever seen in Indonesian political history," and the incarceration of Ahok, he was made deputy governor on 16 October 2017.

In 2018, he was accused of paying opposition parties PAN and PKS Rp 500 billion (US$35 million) each to approve him as Prabowo Subianto's vice presidential candidate for the 2019 presidential election. Regardless, he declared his resignation from his office to participate in the election on 10 August 2018. The resignation was made official on 18 September 2018.

=== Minister of Tourism and Creative Economy ===
After Prabowo's defeat in the 2019 election, Sandiaga did not hold any office until he was appointed as Minister of Tourism and Creative Economy on 22 December 2020. He was announced to replace Wishnutama and was formally appointed on the next day. His appointment was widely well received as many media reported it as a "happy ending" towards the election as both Prabowo and Sandiaga joined the government.

During his ministry, Sandiaga launched the "10 New Balis" initiative. The initiative is meant to diversify Indonesia's travel destinations beyond Bali by developing other tourist destinations such as Lake Toba and Mandalika. It helps to boost regional development in the affected destinations while reduces overtourism in well established destinations, incorporating sustainable practices like disaster-resilient infrastructure and eco-tourism guidelines.

In 2022, Australian Senator Pauline Hanson claimed that Australian tourists returning from Bali had brought disease, saying that they brought manure back to Australia. Her statement attracted strong criticisms from Sandiaga who condemned her statement as an insult towards Bali. Hearing that Hanson spoke about Bali as if the island is a sovereign nation, Sandiaga ridiculed her by telling Hanson to "search Google first" before talking.

In July 2023, Sandiaga was embroiled with backlash from Philippines after commenting on the "Love the Philippines" tourism campaign in which the campaign showed footage that resembles Indonesian rice terraces where he stated that the footage "looks familiar" and even expressed his gratitude for the "free advertisement". Senator Nancy Binay accused Sandiaga of false claims and demanded his apology after tourism secretary Christina Frasco clarified that the tourism campaign doesn't use any footage that resembles Indonesian rice terraces. Sandiaga however clarifies that he completely understand Frasco's efforts and states that the campaign should not only restrict itself to one country but rather suggested to promote ASEAN as a whole region. He also states that it may be an unintentional mistake and there is no need to react emotionally.

He was made a Gerindra member again after that, but later resigned from Gerindra again on 24 April 2023. He joined the PPP on 14 June 2023.

== Teaching career ==
There were multiple reports in Indonesia that Sandiaga Uno was appointed as a "distinguished research professor in residence" at George Washington University. However, he already denied it, claiming that his appointment for the title was for his contribution in entrepreneur researches instead from teaching.

== Controversies ==
=== Paradise Papers ===
In November 2017 an investigation conducted by the International Consortium of Investigative Journalism cited his name in the list of politicians named in "Paradise Papers" allegations. He was claimed to have own an offshore company named NTI resources, as well as several shell companies in British Virgin Islands. Regarding this, the Indonesian Minister of Finance, Sri Mulyani, vowed to study the legitimacy of the paper, and will take an appropriate measure if there was any wrongdoing conducted.

Sandiaga was also previously mentioned in a named list in Panama Papers however he was undaunted with his name on the list and vowed to fully disclose his finance reports. Together with the Paradise Papers, no legal action was taken against him.

=== Program ===
Even before his appointment to the deputy governorship, Sandiaga proceeded to execute plans mentioned during his campaigning. In early October, an entrepreneurship program dubbed OK OCE (One Kecamatan, One Center for Entrepreneurship), which he had called for during the election, was initiated with his elder brother Indra initially acting as president, although the following day he was replaced due to nepotism concerns.

== Honours ==
- Star of Mahaputera, 3rd Class (Indonesian: Bintang Mahaputera Utama) (14 August 2024)

== See also ==
- Inotek Foundation, a non-profit Uno co-founded
