= Anies Baswedan =

Indonesian academician, politician and activist (born 1969)

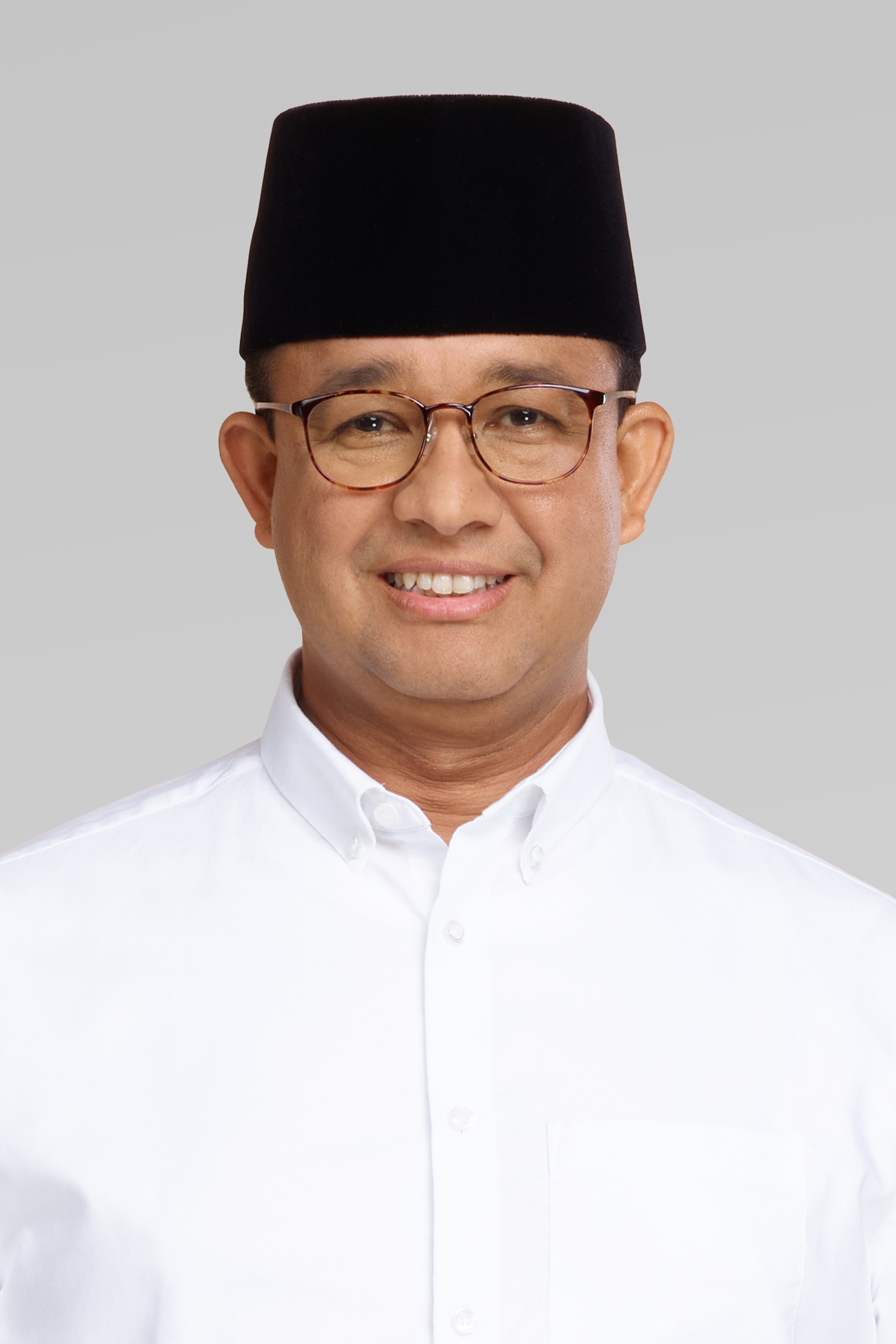
- Portrait, 2024

14th Governor of Jakarta
- In office 16 October 2017 – 16 October 2022
- Vice Governor: Sandiaga Uno (2017–2018); Ahmad Riza Patria (2020–2022)
- Preceded by: Djarot Saiful Hidayat
- Succeeded by: Pramono Anung

27th Minister of Education and Culture
- In office 27 October 2014 – 27 July 2016
- President: Joko Widodo
- Preceded by: Muhammad Nuh
- Succeeded by: Muhadjir Effendy

2nd Rector of Paramadina University
- In office 14 May 2007 – 7 January 2015
- Preceded by: Nurcholish Madjid
- Succeeded by: Firmanzah

6th Chair of the Association of Provincial Governments of Indonesia
- In office 26 November 2019 – 16 October 2022
- Preceded by: Longki Djanggola
- Succeeded by: Isran Noor

Personal details
- Born: Anies Rasyid Baswedan; 7 May 1969 (age 57) Kuningan Regency, West Java, Indonesia
- Party: Independent
- Other political affiliations: Coalition of Change for Unity (2023–2024)
- Spouse: Fery Farhati Ganis (m. 1996)
- Children: 4
- Relatives: Abdurrahman Baswedan (grandfather); Novel Baswedan (cousin)
- Education: Gadjah Mada University (S.E.); University of Maryland, College Park (MPP); Northern Illinois University (PhD)
- Occupation: Academician; politician; activist
- Website: aniesbaswedan.com

Anies Rasyid Baswedan (Indonesian pronunciation: [ˌanɪs ˌraʃɪd baˈswedan], born 7 May 1969) is an Indonesian academician, politician and activist. He served as the 14th Governor of Jakarta from 2017 to 2022 and served as the 27th Minister of Education and Culture. A student activist and political analyst before entering public service, Baswedan served as the 2nd Rector of Paramadina University. He is also the founder of Indonesia Mengajar, a program that selects, trains and assigns university graduates to serve in a one-year teaching mission across the country. Baswedan was a candidate for president in the 2024 Indonesian presidential election.

== Early life and education ==
Anies Rasyid Baswedan was born on 7 May 1969, in Kuningan, a city in Kuningan Regency, West Java, as the eldest son and child of the four children of Rasyid Baswedan (1934–2013), an economic lecturer who served as the vice rector at Islamic University of Indonesia, and Aliyah Rasyid (born 1940), a professor at the Faculty of Social and Political Science at the Yogyakarta State University. He had two younger brothers, Ridwan Rasyid (1973–2017), a reform activist, and Abdillah Rasyid Baswedan (1980), a businessman, and a younger sister, Haifa Baswedan (1971–1978). They were raised with a straightforward and firm upbringing, enabling all three siblings to successfully complete their postgraduate studies. Baswedan's paternal grandfather was Abdurrahman Baswedan, a journalist, Indonesian independence activist and diplomat who served as a member of the Investigating Committee for Preparatory Work for Independence (BPUPK) and as Deputy Minister of Information of the Republic of Indonesia in the first Sjahrir Cabinet. He was awarded the title of National Hero of Indonesia by President Joko Widodo at the Istana Negara in November 2018. In 1978, when Baswedan was vacationing in Jakarta with his family, his sister Haifa died at the Halim Perdanakusuma International Airport due to being crushed by a cupboard in the bathroom. Baswedan later referred the accident as the lowest point of his life and experienced a major psychological impact due to the fact that he would never see his sister again.

Anies grew up in Yogyakarta, attending SMP Negeri 5 and SMA Negeri 2 Yogyakarta. In 1987, he spent one year as an AFS Intercultural Programs exchange student in Milwaukee, Wisconsin. He returned to Indonesia and enrolled at Gadjah Mada University, spending a summer attending Summer Session of Asian Studies at Sophia University in Tokyo, and graduating with a degree in business management. As a Fulbright Scholar, he went to receive his M.P.M. in international security and economic policy from the University of Maryland School of Public Policy (where he was a William P. Cole III Fellow), and Ph.D. in political science from Northern Illinois University, where he was a Gerald S. Maryanov Fellow.

== Academic career ==
=== Paramadina University rector ===
On 15 May 2007, he was appointed rector of Paramadina University, a private university in Jakarta. He succeeded Nurcholish Madjid (commonly referred to as Cak Nur), a prominent liberal Muslim intellectual and scholar who had served as rector since the university's founding in 1998. He became the youngest rector of an Indonesian university, at 38. As rector, Anies established Paramadina Fellowship and included anti-corruption education in the core curriculum, first of its kind in the country.

=== Indonesia Mengajar ===
Anies rose to national prominence in 2009 when he initiated the Indonesia Mengajar (Indonesia Teaching) Foundation, a nationwide program that selects, trains, and assigns university graduates to serve in a one-year teaching mission across the country. The program was established in response to the unequal quality of education in Indonesia, particularly in the poor and rural parts of the archipelago. Anies remained in the leadership until 2013 when he resigned to pursue his political career.

== Political career ==
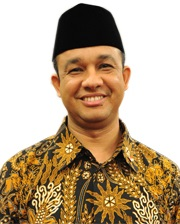
Anies Baswedan as Minister of Education and Culture

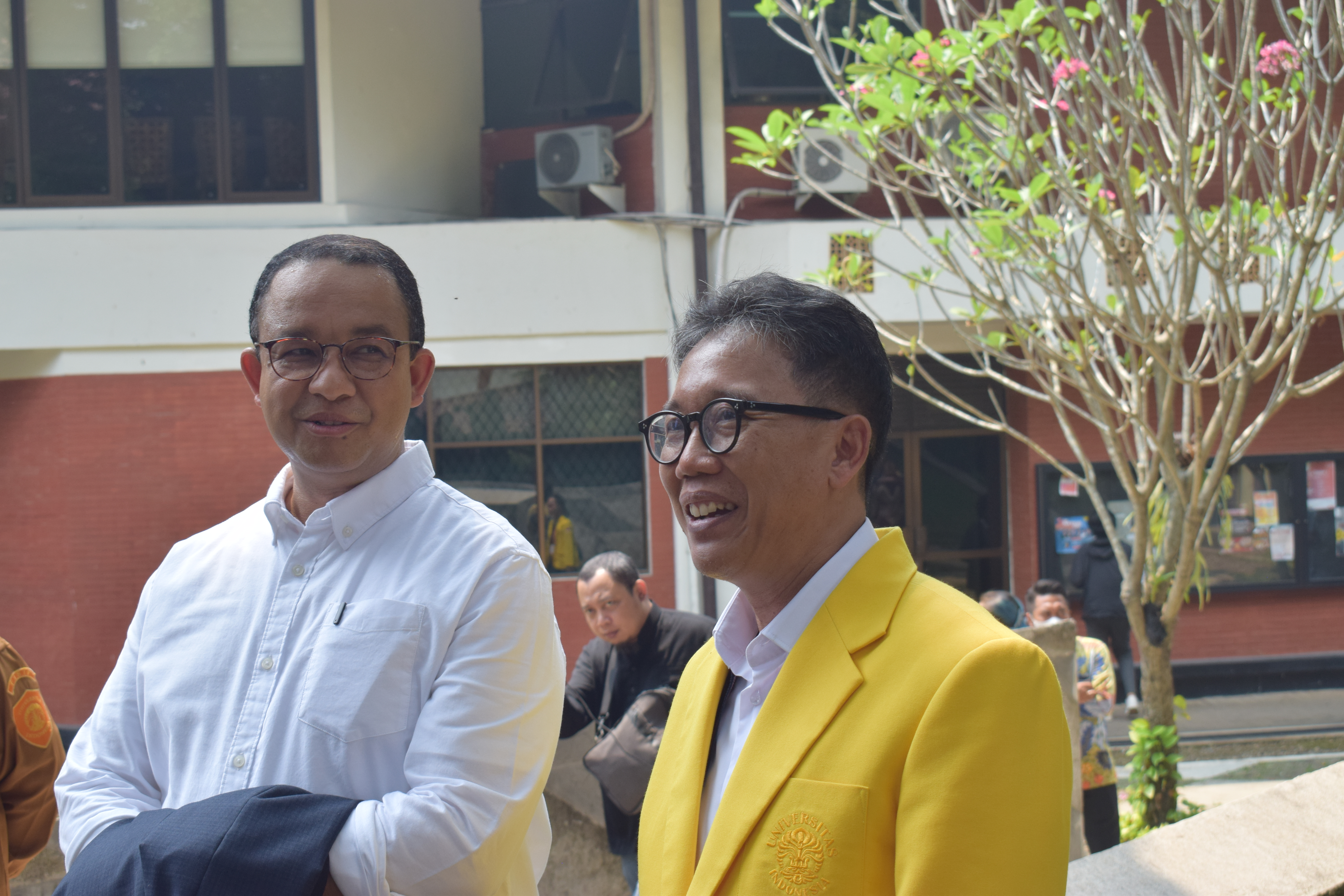
Anies Baswedan with the Dean of the Faculty of Social and Political Sciences of the University of Indonesia, Semiarto Aji Purwanto.

Politically, Anies had been an independent during the early years of his career. He moderated the first debate of 2009 presidential election. He also served in several capacities during Susilo Bambang Yudhoyono's administration. Baswedan served as the official spokesperson for the so-called "Team of Eight", which was appointed by President Yudhoyono to oversee the infamous public feud between Corruption Eradication Commission (KPK) and National Police (Polri), which saw two of the commissioners were criminally charged. In December 2011, he also served on a panel to select potential members of the General Elections Commission (KPU).

In 2010, alongside prominent figures like Sultan Hamengkubuwono X of Yogyakarta and former Muhammadiyah chairman, Ahmad Syafi'i Maarif, Anies co-founded Nasdem, a mass organization. He left soon after it was declared a political party led by media mogul, Surya Paloh. Nasdem went on to win legislative seats in the 2014 legislative election, becoming part of the Widodo coalition.

=== Joko Widodo presidential campaign ===
Baswedan joined the Joko Widodo presidential campaign as an official spokesperson. Joko Widodo, a fellow Gadjah Mada University graduate, was said to believe that his presence would gather votes from Indonesian youth voters, a demographic closely affiliated with Anies.

=== Presidential transition ===
After Joko Widodo was declared the winner of the presidential election by the KPU on 22 July 2014, Baswedan was then appointed the Deputy for the presidential transition office, led by Rini Soemarno. The transition team was intended to prepare the cabinet and perfect the program before the official appointment of Joko Widodo and Jusuf Kalla as President and Vice President, respectively. He helped the formation of the cabinet, working alongside Hasto Kristiyanto, Andi Widjajanto, and Akbar Faizal; all but Kristiyanto eventually became Cabinet ministers.

=== Minister of Education and Culture ===
After Joko Widodo's victory in the presidential election, Anies became the Minister of Education and Culture. And he was inaugurated on 27 October 2014, as a part of the Working Cabinet of President Joko Widodo. As minister, he postponed the implementation of the 2013 Curriculum and returning it to the previous 2006 Curriculum, citing unpreparedness for implementing the curriculum. However, this policy was actually criticized from the former Minister of Education and Culture Mohammad Nuh and the People's Representative Council who considered that this policy was carried out without study and communication, where the elimination of the 2013 Curriculum policy had implications for the state budget.

Anies changed the National Exam to become not a measure of graduation, but only as a mapping of the quality of regional education, established the National Examination Integrity Index to measure the honesty of students in each province, and established a Teacher Competency Test and Teacher Certification Program to improve teacher competence.

In the reshuffle of the Working Cabinet on 27 July 2016, Anies was replaced by Muhadjir Effendy, Chancellor of the Muhammadiyah University of Malang. Baswedan was accused of deviating from the President's vision by not prioritizing the president's Smart Indonesia Card program. On 10 March 2017, he was reported to the Corruption Eradication Commission for allegedly misappropriating funds amounting to 146 billion rupiah at Frankfurt Book Fair in 2015 when he was still served as Ministry of Education. He was also suspected of having a dark agenda due to smuggled Amba by Laksmi Pamuntjak and Pulang by Leila S. Chudori, a two books which discussed about the 30 September Movement.

== Governor of Jakarta (2017–2022) ==
2017 Jakarta gubernatorial election result, with districts won by Anies shown in red

=== Election and inauguration ===
On 15 September 2016, Prabowo Subianto, the leader of the Gerindra Party, announced the nomination of Anies as the gubernatorial nominee, with Sandiaga Uno, a Gerindra politician and businessman, as his running mate after talks between Gerindra and the Prosperous Justice Party (PKS). The Anies-Sandiaga pair was assigned the ballot number 3 and was slated to compete against Agus Harimurti Yudhoyono-Sylviana Murni (assigned the ballot number 1) and incumbents Basuki Tjahaja Purnama-Djarot Saiful Hidayat (assigned the ballot number 2). The pair campaigned with the jargons of Jakarta Maju Bersama (Jakarta Onward Together) and Maju Kotanya, Bahagia Warganya (The City Forward, The Citizens Happy).

After the first round of voting on 15 February 2017, Anies proceeded to the second round run-off between two candidates, having secured approximately 40% of the vote, behind Basuki with 44%, and well ahead of Agus with 16%. Before the second round, the National Mandate Party (PAN) and the United Development Party (PPP), which supported the Agus-Sylvi pair, threw their support to the Anies-Sandiaga pair for the second round. On 19 April 2017 Anies won the runoff election, with approximately 58% of the votes, ahead of Ahok's 42%. His victory was notably aided with the support of Islamist groups, particularly the Islamic Defenders Front.

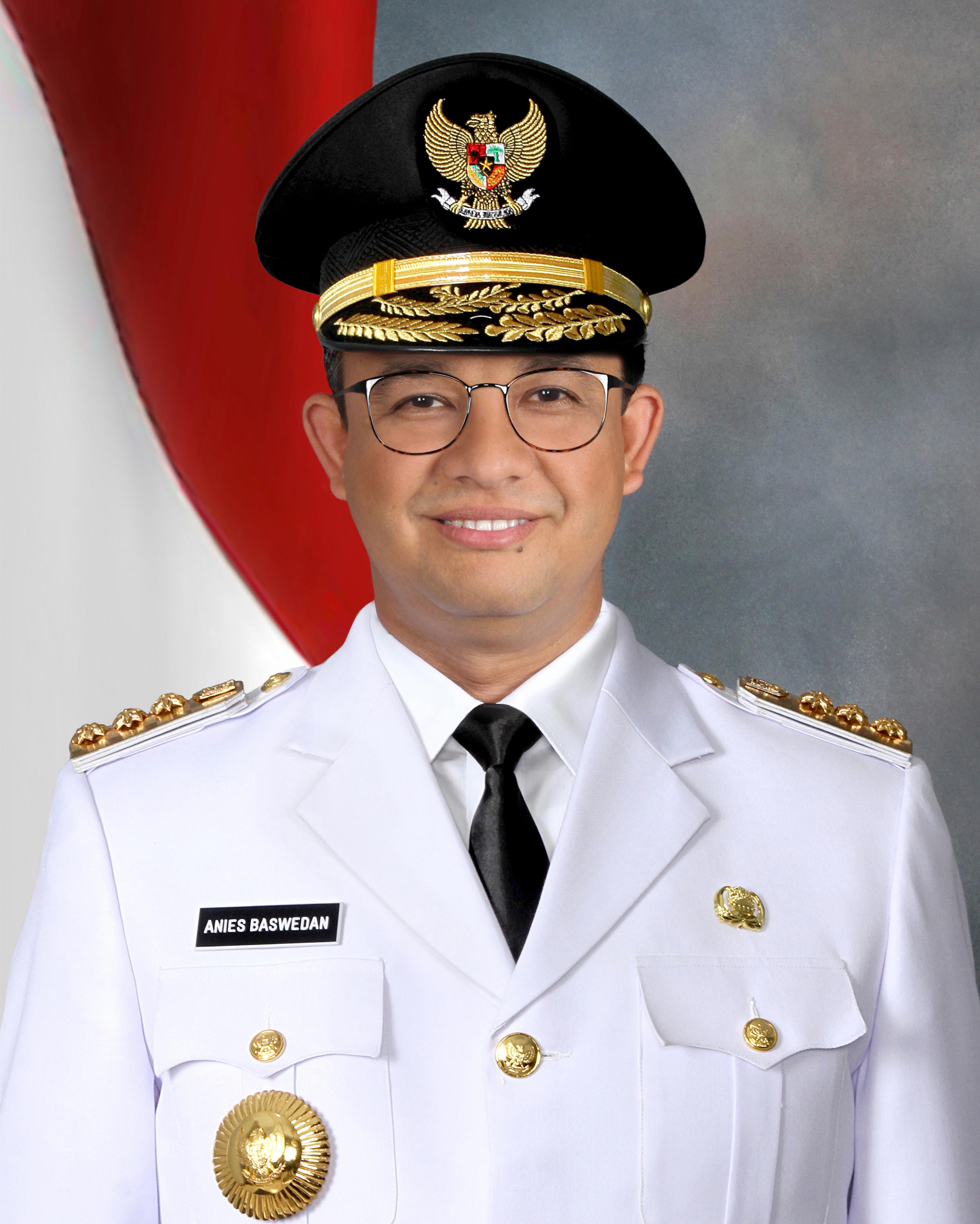
Baswedan as Governor of Jakarta (2017–2022)

He was officially inaugurated as governor on 16 October 2017, replacing interim governor Djarot Saiful Hidayat. As Djarot was unable to attend the inauguration, Anies handed the office over from Saefullah, the daily executor of Jakarta's gubernatorial powers, before giving his first speech as governor at the Jakarta City Hall that night.

=== Tenure ===
While retaining or expanding several popular programs such as the Public Facility Maintenance Agency, Anies did not continue several of his predecessor's policies, some of which included regularly recording meetings of the government and then uploading them to YouTube and the reclamation of several islands; it however allowed four islands as it already started building. Other policies include construction of the Aquarium Village, revitalization of traditional markets, closure of the Alexis Hotel in connection with the prostitution business, formation of the Governor's Team for the Acceleration of Development (Tim Gubernur untuk Percepatan Pembangunan, TGUPP), the construction of the Jakarta International Stadium, and the improvement of the Smart Jakarta Card (Kartu Jakarta Pintar, KJP) that eventually became the Smart Jakarta Card Plus (Kartu Jakarta Pintar Plus, KJP Plus).

Even though Jakarta is a metropolitan city that is densely populated, it can produce horticulture, for example rice. For the first time, Jakarta exported 19 tons of rice to Riyadh, Saudi Arabia, through business-to-business cooperation between PT Food Station Tjipinang Jaya, namely a regionally-owned enterprise and Al Raqeeb Universal Group.

In November 2017, he claimed that congestion in the Tanah Abang district was caused by pedestrians, instead of due to the street vendors conducting business on the area's sidewalks and roads. The city administration followed through by closing a 400-meter road stretch for traffic (except for TransJakarta buses) in order to accommodate the street vendors, against criticism from pedestrians, public transport drivers and regular vendors. Although some observers noted that the move might be a violation of national regulations, the street vendors and some city officials praised the move.

Anies in 2019 initiated a school meal program for Jakarta's schoolchildren, starting with 144,000 students in 459 schools that year.

==== Housing and zero down payment ====
One of his programs during the campaign was that the people of Jakarta to own a house with a low down payment (abbreviated as DP), even zero. This program was claimed to be attractive to residents because it is difficult to find affordable housing in Jakarta. However, the program attracted a lot of criticism and was known to have inconsistencies. Anies initially proposed the name "Zero Percent DP", which was soon realized that it violated the rules of Bank Indonesia. He then changed it to "Zero Rupiah DP" and then "Zero DP", by making claims that the public misinterpreted his idea and that "Zero Rupiah DP" was not the same as Bank Indonesia's ban on "Zero Percent DP" installments. Anies was also considered to be inconsistent about whether the houses being offered are landed houses or flats. He denied that the provincial government will not build houses, but will only facilitate various housing transactions. Sandi rectified this statement again, stating that this program is similar to the flats program in Singapore, where the program is in the form of the government building houses, not being a financing facilitator.

Anies' "Zero DP" idea was considered unreasonable because the down payment installments themselves are considered difficult for ordinary people to fulfill, with installments of IDR 2,300,000 per month. Anies-Sandi was considered unable to indicate in which areas the program would be implemented, considering that there was enough empty land to facilitate the program to overcome the backlog of 1.3 million houses. He emphasized that the bank would be involved in helping the people enjoy "Zero DP", but was criticized because the total tens of trillions of money needed did not match the financial strength of Bank DKI which was predicted to help this program. As of September 2022, only 2,322 units of the target of 9,081 units have been realized.

The flats, initially using a renting system with a payment of IDR 5,000 to 15,000 every day, was changed into a buying system with down payment of IDR 0 and a flat interest installment of 5% with the price of around IDR 200 million and 400 million for 23.8 m^{2} and 34.3 m^{2} in area, respectively.

==== Transportation ====
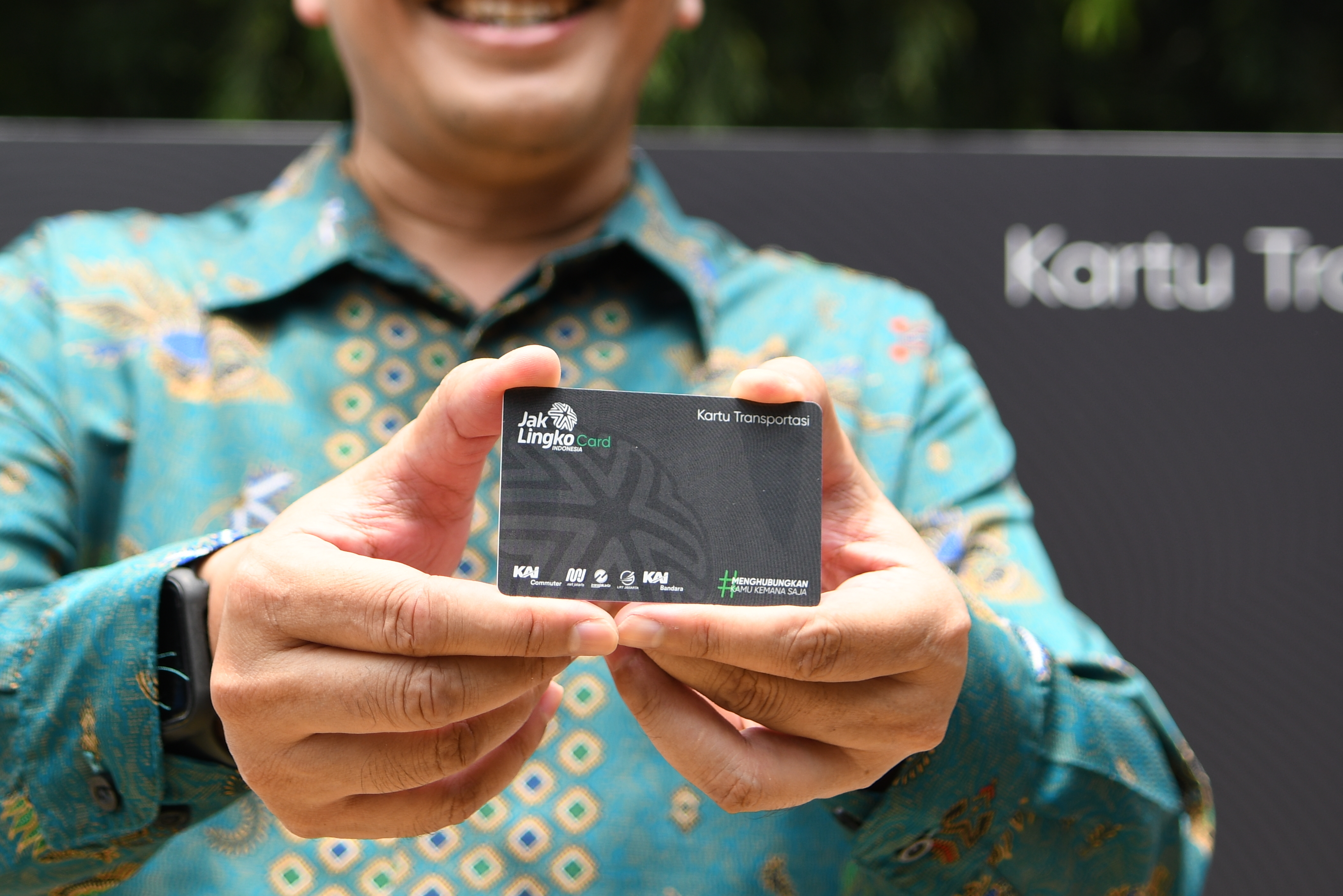
The Jak Lingko payment card, as shown on 29 September 2021

Integrating the public transportation system was one of Anies' campaign promises. The program, OK OTrip (One Karcis (ticket), One Trip), opened to a trial period in 2017 with 90 buses and 4 routes. This program allows passengers to pay just one payment of IDR 5,000 (or IDR 3,500 during the trial period) to then use various small bus services to Transjakarta for 3 hours. However, it had problems, ranging from the tariff, drivers' salaries, the distance requirements which was deemed too high at 190 kilometres, and concerns that it may violate Bank Indonesia regulations, the gubernatorial regulation, the contract with the Government Goods and Services Procurement Policy Institute (Lembaga Kebijakan Pengadaan Barang dan Jasa Pemerintah, LKPP). This led to the trial period being extended four times from its original end date of 15 April 2018.

In 2018, the program was rebranded as Jak Lingko, where "Jak" refers to Jakarta and "Lingko" deriving from the name of the interconnected irrigation network used in the Manggarai Regency on Flores Island, East Nusa Tenggara. In September 2021, JakLingko officially announced its third generation payment card and a new mobility app, on limited trial since August 2021. JakLingko would implement Mobility-as-a-Service through the app by March 2022. It would later enable account based ticketing with fare classes by August 2022.

In May 2019, Transjakarta was testing electric buses, with Bundaran Senayan – Monas as its first route, before launching 30 electric Transjakarta buses in October 2022 to serve 4 routes: Senen - Senayan Roundabout, Tanah Abang - Senen Terminal, Blok M - Tanah Abang, and Ragunan - Blok M, and was targeted to have 100 electric buses by the end of the year.

Under his governorship, new modes of public transportation were launched; namely the Jakarta MRT, Jakarta LRT, and the Soekarno-Hatta Airport Rail Link, which were all inaugurated on 24 March 2019, 1 December 2019, and 2 January 2018 respectively.

==== COVID-19 ====
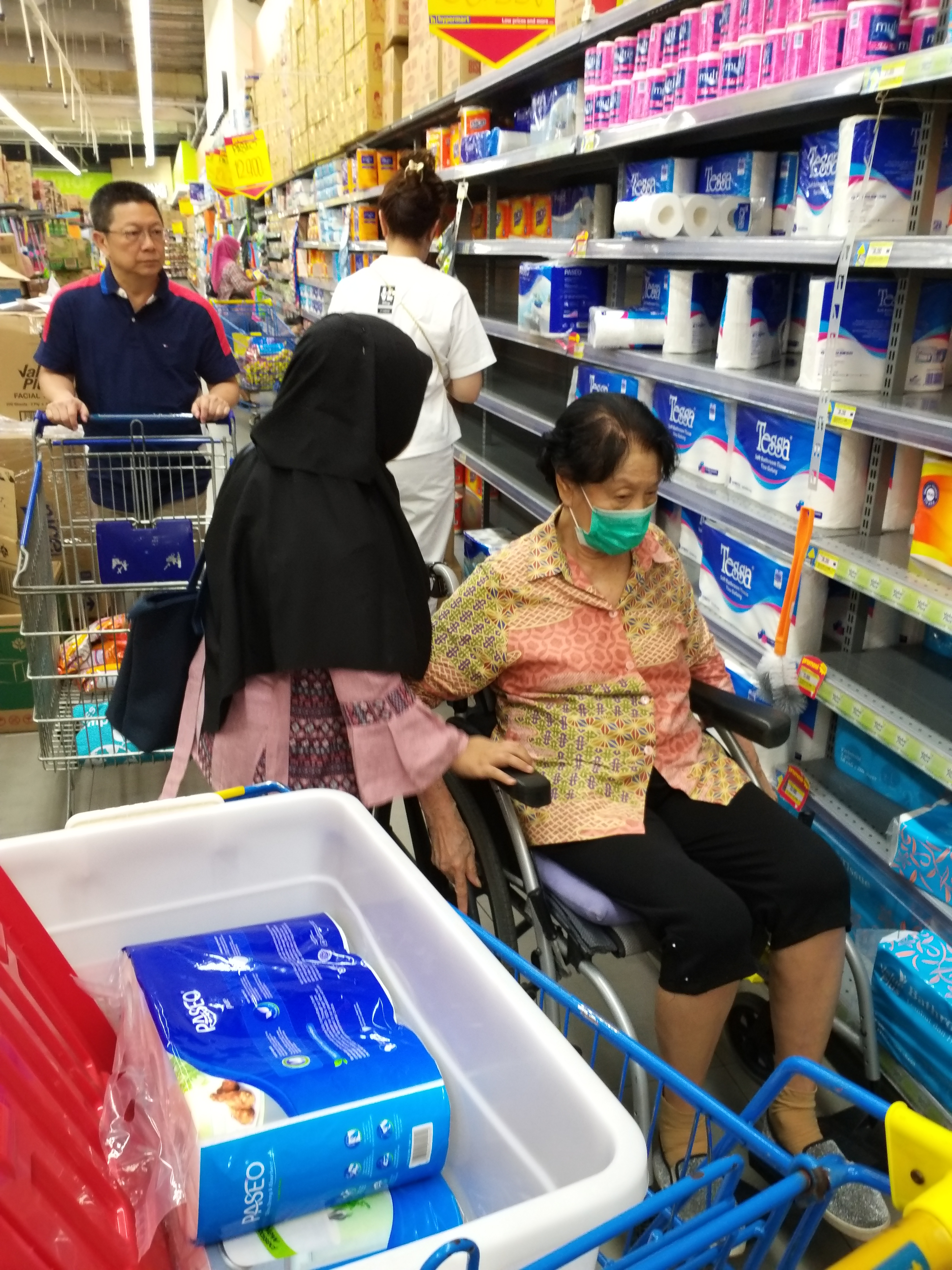
Panic buying in Jakarta

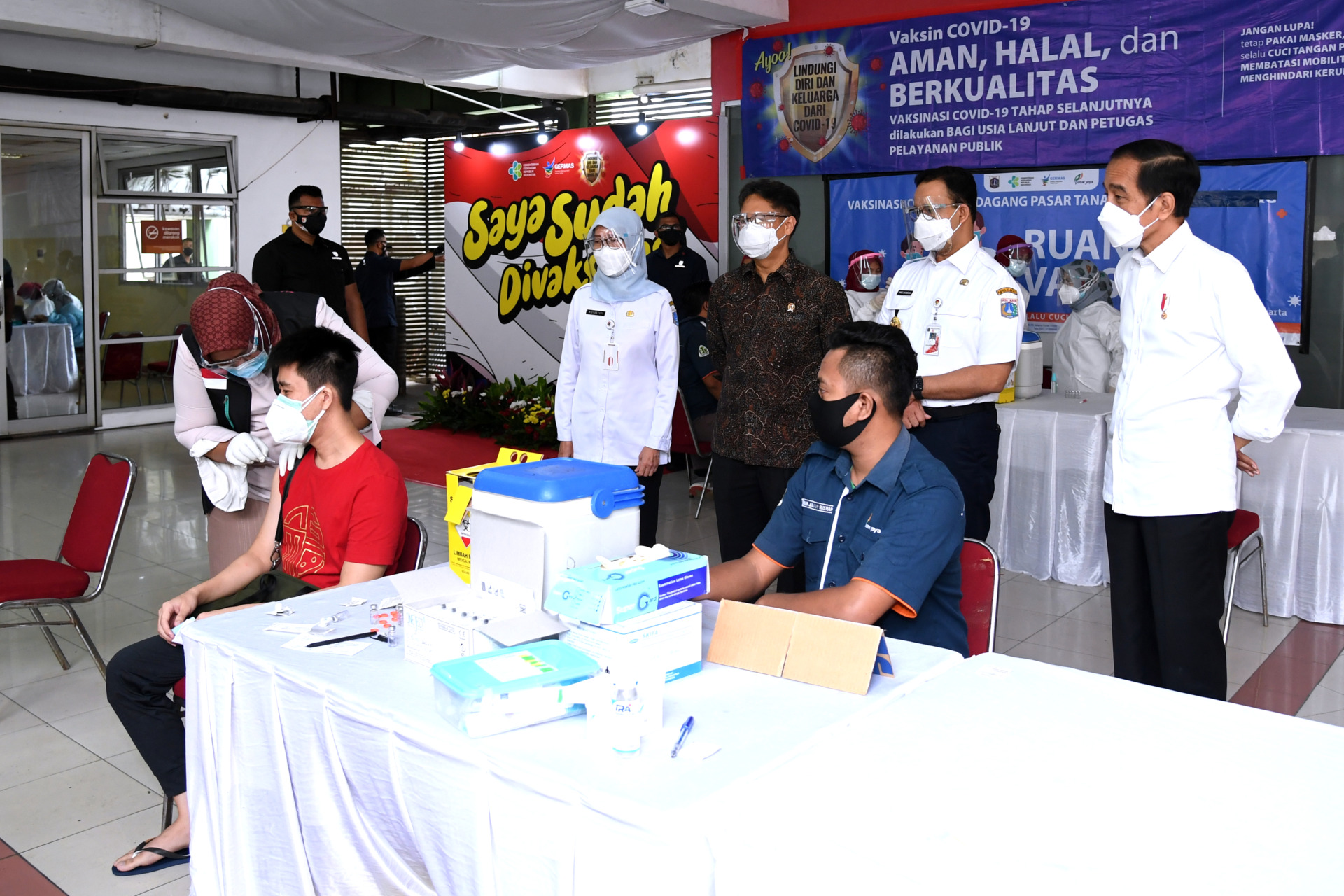
Anies with President Joko Widodo inspecting a vaccination center at Tanah Abang

On 7 January 2020, when the coronavirus was still an epidemic in Wuhan, China, Anies anticipated the outbreak by informing the DKI Jakarta Provincial Health Office to all hospitals in Jakarta to conduct research and detect any symptoms of pneumonia in Wuhan. The leadership meeting was held with the Immigration Foreigner Supervision Team to discuss the COVID-19 disease to know and anticipate people who came from the place of origin of the outbreak. Then, in February 2020, the DKI Jakarta Provincial Government monitored people who had symptoms of pneumonia, later being identified as COVID-19. Since January 2020, the number of people under monitoring or patients under surveillance continued to grow. After that, Anies issued Governor's Instruction No. 16 of 2020 concerning Increasing Awareness of the Risk of Transmission of Corona Virus Disease (COVID-19).

When the first two COVID-19-positive patients were detected in Indonesia, Anies announced the formation of a COVID-19 Response Team. Motor vehicle-free days were abolished to avoid crowds. This was followed by the abolition of learning activities at schools, cessation of office operations, entertainment venues, and tourist destinations which he also closed in March 2020. The large-scale social restrictions (PSBB) were first implemented by the DKI Jakarta Provincial Government, as well as the first PSBB implemented in Indonesia.

On 16 March, MRT Jakarta, LRT and TransJakarta started to reduce number of trips, corridors and timetables (06.00 – 18.00), however, this policy was retracted due to long queue in many bus stops and train stations in morning. Odd-even policy will be halted during outbreak. On 20 March, Anies Baswedan declared a state of emergency in Jakarta for the next 14 days, lasting until 2 April. On 28 March, Jakarta provincial government extended the state of emergency until 19 April. On 2 April, Anies Baswedan allocated IDR 3 trillion to fight the COVID-19 pandemic, and the budget will be used to fund the city's fight against the virus up until May this year, by gradually allocating IDR 1.3 trillion and an additional IDR 2 trillion Jakarta's application for curfew was approved by the Ministry of Health on 7 April and is set to take effect from Friday, 10 April for at least two weeks. On 21 April, the local government prepared 136 schools as isolation areas for COVID-19 and the policy is currently still a proposal waiting for approval from the Education Office. On 9 September, Anies decided to reimpose large-scale social restrictions starting from 14 September due to the high spike of COVID-19 cases in the province.

On 1 December 2020, it was confirmed that Anies tested positive for COVID-19. The test and the announcement came after his deputy, Ahmad Riza Patria, was also known to have contracted the virus.

== 2024 presidential campaign ==
Slogan of Coalition of Change for Unity on Anies Baswedan 2024 presidential campaign

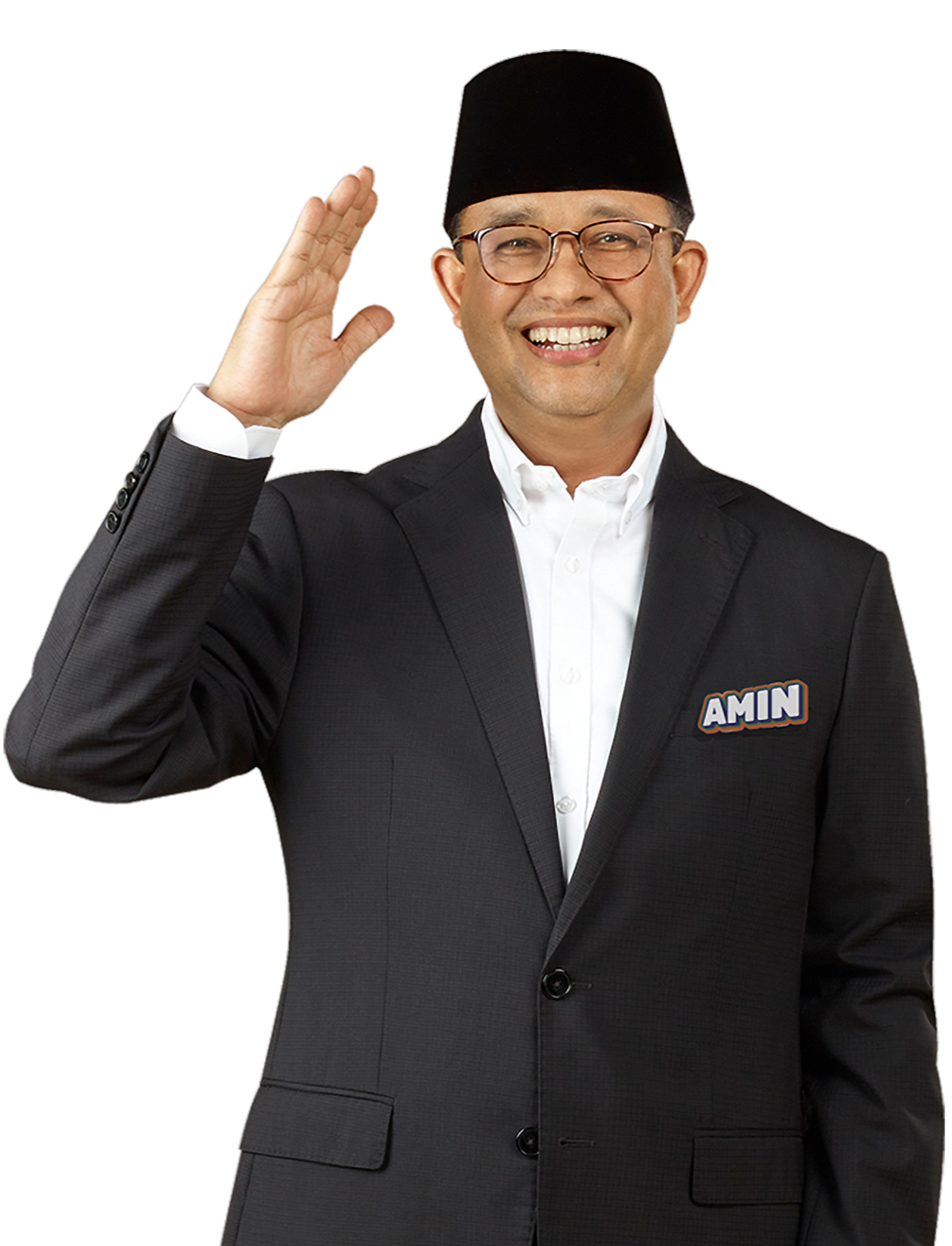
Electoral portrait, 2024

Anies Baswedan was elected the governor of Jakarta, capital of Indonesia, in 2017. In 2018, then-candidate Prabowo Subianto asked Anies to become his running mate for the 2019 presidential election but refused due to his commitment as governor until 2022. Nearing the end of his term, his name came up again as a potential presidential candidate. The incumbent president, Joko Widodo (“Jokowi”) was governor of Jakarta before his candidacy as president in 2014. Anies was once one of the candidates at the Democratic Party convention in 2013, but lost to Dahlan Iskan. In the end the Democratic Party failed to register their nominee for having their number of seats below the presidential threshold.

The announcement of Muhaimin and the PKB sparked controversy within Anies coalition as some of the parties that provided initial support for Anies' candidacy, the Democratic Party and the Prosperous Justice Party (PKS), were not previously notified of Muhaimin's candidacy. The announcement shocked the Democratic Party. The party claimed that Anies had previously asked its chairman, Agus Harimurti Yudhoyono (AHY), to be his running mate but there was no agreement between the Nasdem Party and Anies as they were still waiting for other potential candidates. But at the same time, Nasdem's chairman, Surya Paloh, decided to forge unity between Anies and Muhaimin as a pair of presidential-vice presidential candidates. After an emergency meeting held at Democratic Party founder Susilo Bambang Yudhoyono's house in Cikeas, Bogor Regency, the Democrats announced their withdrawal from Anies coalition. Shortly after, the party joined Prabowo coalition, albeit their effort to offer AHY as Prabowo's candidate failed as Gibran Rakabuming was chosen as his running mate. The PKS, on the other hand, were disappointed by the sudden decision to pick Muhaimin as a vice-presidential candidate, but remained committed to the coalition.

== Controversies ==
During his political career as Minister of Education and Governor of Jakarta, Anies Baswedan has attracted a lot of controversy. Starting from the background of his dismissal as minister, the issue of racism during his campaign, corruption cases regarding to hosting the Formula E, and his handling of flooding and air pollution problems in Jakarta.

=== Alleged corruption cases ===
==== 2015 Frankfurt Book Fair ====
While serving as Minister of Education and Culture, Anies Baswedan budgeted 10 million euros (around 146 billion rupiah) for the 2015 Frankfurt Book Fair. The budget was considered too large so Anies was reported to the Corruption Eradication Commission.

==== Formula E ====
The Corruption Eradication Commission (KPK) cited the high commitment fee paid by the provincial government for the Jakarta ePrix event. Also in accordance with Government Regulation Number 19 of 2019 concerning Regional Financial Management, in article 98 paragraph (6); funding of activities for several years should not exceed the end of the term of office, except for national priorities and strategic matters, as Jakarta governor Anies Baswedan is scheduled to leave office starting in 2022. Responding to the high commitment fee, one of the members of the Regional People's Representative Council in Jakarta, Hardiyanto Kenneth asked to return the commitment fee.

In August 2021, 2 political parties the Indonesian Democratic Party of Struggle (PDI-P) and the Indonesian Solidarity Party (PSI) attempted a failed Jakarta ePrix interpellation of Anies Baswedan because it was included in the 2021–2022 regional priorities. According to Prasetio, this incident has the potential to burden the next governor succeeding Anies. As of 24 January 2022, the circuit construction tender was declared failed according to the PT Jakpro e-procurement site. One member of the Jakarta Regional House of Representative, Gembong Warsono, accused the failure of deliberately doing so that PT Jakpro could choose the contractor directly. Even though the tender failed, it was later announced on 5 February that PT Jaya Construction Manggala Pratama had won the tender. On 27 May 2022, the roof of the spectator stands at the Ancol circuit collapsed due to strong winds.

=== Identity politics ===
During the 2017 Jakarta gubernatorial election, there were many issues and cases related to racial discrimination, especially from Anies-Sandi supporters who were suspected by many people and political observers to have practiced identity politics during the campaign period. Siti Zuhro, a senior researcher from the Indonesian Institute of Sciences (LIPI) believes that she noted the 2017 election as "the worst local leader's election because it was unable to prioritize rationality" and led to "sensitive issues such as racism".

When he was appointed governor on 16 October 2017, Anies mentioned the term 'pribumi'. The use of this term is prohibited by Presidential Instruction number 26 of 1998 issued by former president B.J. Habibie. His acceptance speech was lambasted by his predecessor Basuki Tjahaja Purnama, who called Anies' victory speech as un-statesman like.

Anies' campaign for president for 2024 also sparked worries that identity politics with a similar magnitude will be a regular occurrence in the campaign trail. Anies himself said that identity politics cannot be avoided because every candidate brought their own identities. Despite assurances from his running mate, Muhaimin Iskandar, that there will be no identity politics used during the course of the campaign, it became unavoidable to not associate Anies with ethnicity, religion, racial and intergroup (SARA) identity politics especially with the endorsement from Rizieq Shihab and the Islamic Defenders Front, or convicted terrorist Abu Bakar Ba'asyir in his presidential campaign.

=== Remark and policies ===
In 2018, he stated that water from rainfall must be returned to Earth, as God wills it, instead of flowing out to the sea. He echoed similar remarks during his campaign for governorship in 2017. His statements came back to haunt him however during the 2020 Jakarta floods when his statement is used by political rivals against him.

His policies regarding building permits on reclaimed land on the north of Jakarta and demolishing slums without permits have run contrary to his campaign promises in 2017. He also gained more controversy due to the mistake city officials made during the budgeting process, resulting in highly inflated prices such as Aibon glue that costs around 82 billion rupiah (around $6 million). During his tenure, the city gave an award to Colosseum Club 1001, a nightclub in Kuningan, Jakarta. This award was later revoked when it was found that the club had numerous issues with drugs and narcotics.

On 11 November 2020, Baswedan met chairman of Islamic Defenders Front, Rizieq Shihab, who had returned to Indonesia and was criticized for violating health protocols which required people who have just arrived from abroad to quarantine for 14 days during the COVID-19 pandemic.

=== 2024 presidential election ===
On 3 October 2022, Anies attended the declaration on the determination of the presidential candidate proposed by the NasDem Party for the 2024 Indonesian Presidential General Election. This declaration was considered by political observer and senior researcher at the Surabaya Survey Center, Surokim Abdussalam, to be "inappropriately apathetic" because the Indonesian people were still in a state of mourning due to the tragedy in Kanjuruhan.

When asked by Prabowo Subianto regarding to his handling on Jakarta's air pollution with Jakarta's annual budget of Rp.58 billion, Anies answered that the pollution in Jakarta is inconsistent and air pollution followed 'wherever the wind blows', further stating that air pollution and wind doesn't have identity cards. In response, Prabowo criticized Anies that "It's easy to blame the wind, rain and so on, maybe there's no need for a government then".

== Personal life ==
Baswedan is married to Fery Farhati Ganis, a psychology graduate from Gadjah Mada University, on 11 May 1996. They had a daughter, Mutiara Annisa Baswedan (b. 1997), and three sons, Mikail Azizi, Kaisar Hakam, and Ismail Hakim Baswedan.

Political offices
Preceded by Muhammad Nuh	Minister of Education and Culture; 2014–2016	Succeeded by Muhadjir Effendy
Preceded by Djarot Saiful Hidayat; Saefullah (interim)	Governor of Jakarta; 2017–2022	Succeeded by Heru Budi Hartono (acting); Teguh Setyabudi (acting)
