= 2017 Jakarta gubernatorial election =

- 15 February 2017 (first round); 19 April 2017 (second round)
- Turnout: 75.64% (▲8.93pp) (first round); 77.02% (▲1.38pp) (second round)
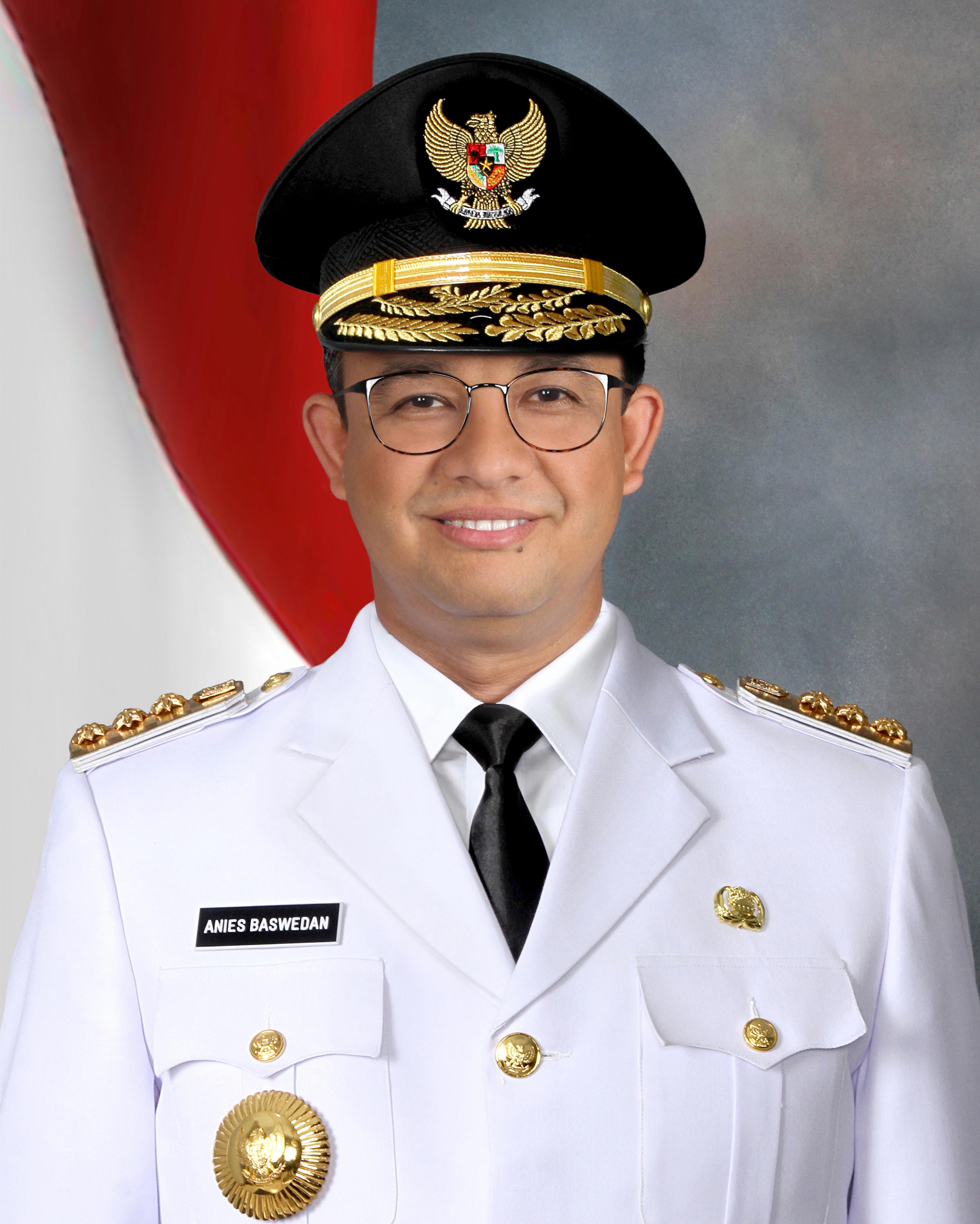

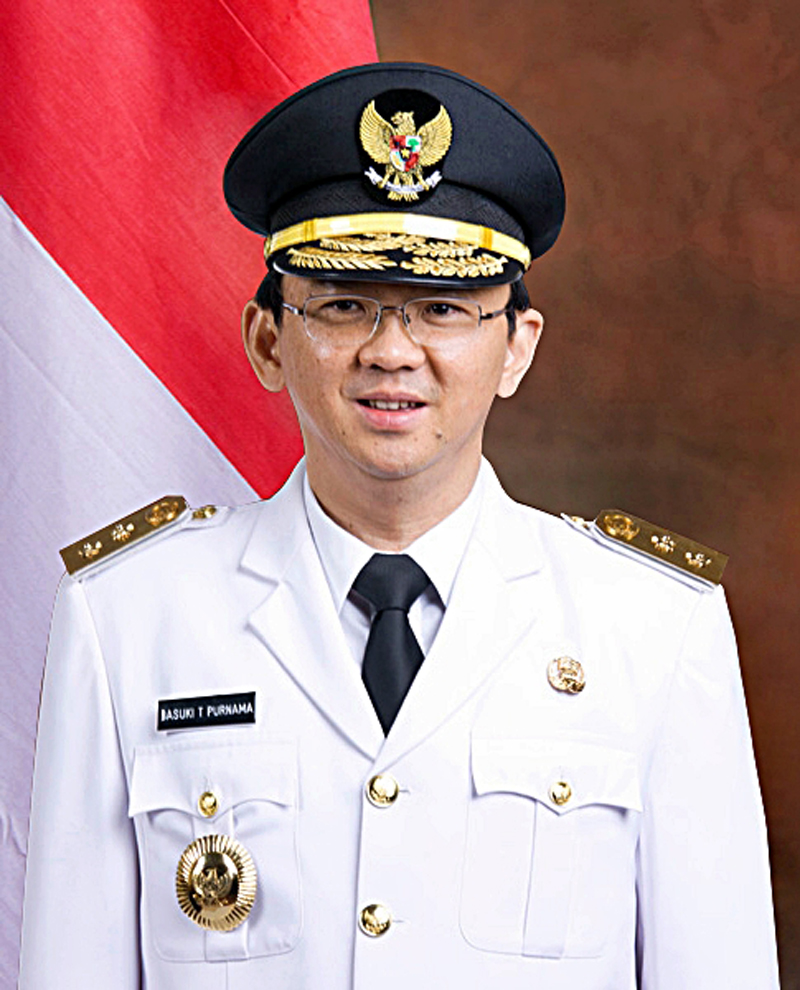
Candidate	Anies Baswedan	Basuki Tjahaja Purnama
Party	Independent (Gerindra's nominee)	Independent (PDI-P's nominee)
Alliance	Gerindra, PKS	Hanura, Golkar, NasDem, PPP, PKB
Running mate	Sandiaga Uno	Djarot Saiful Hidayat
Popular vote	3,240,987	2,350,366
Percentage	57.96%	42.04%
Governor before election
Basuki Tjahaja Purnama
PDI-P
Elected Governor
Anies Baswedan
Independent

Gubernatorial elections were held in Jakarta as part of the 2017 simultaneous elections on 15 February and 19 April 2017 to elect the governor of Jakarta to a five-year term. Incumbent governor Basuki Tjahaja Purnama, popularly referred to as "Ahok", and his deputy Djarot Saiful Hidayat were running for re-election to a second term. Basuki, who inherited his current position from his running mate Joko Widodo when he won the 2014 Indonesian presidential election, would have become the first elected Chinese-Christian governor of Jakarta had he won.

Under the constitution, if no candidate secured a majority of the votes, a runoff election would be held between the top two candidates. The results of quick counts in the first round indicated that Purnama led by a narrow 3–4% margin, and that a runoff would be held on 19 April.

Quick counts for the 19 April runoff indicated that Anies Baswedan was elected as governor; Ahok conceded defeat hours after the polls closed. The official results of the election is Anies Baswedan - Sandiaga Uno 57.96% to Basuki Tjahaja Purnama - Djarot Saiful Hidayat 42.04% published by General Elections Commission (KPU) of Special Capital Region of Jakarta in May; however, unofficial tallies from the election commission showed that Baswedan won 58% to Ahok's 42%.

== Candidates ==
Under regulations, only political parties having 22 seats or more in the regional parliament (DPRD) can put forward a candidate. Political parties with fewer seats can put forward a candidate only if they have acquired support from other political parties. Independent candidates are able to run if they have gathered at least 532,213 signatures from local residents, which will be verified by the local election committee.

This election was contested by three candidates together with their running mate.

#	Candidate	Running mate	Parties
1	Agus Harimurti Yudhoyono	Sylviana Murni	Democratic Party (10 seats); United Development Party (10 seats); National Awakening Party (6 seats); National Mandate Party (2 seats); Total: 28 seats (26.4%)
2	Basuki Tjahaja Purnama	Djarot Saiful Hidayat	Indonesian Democratic Party of Struggle (28 seats); People's Conscience Party (10 seats); Golkar Party (9 seats); NasDem Party (5 seats); Total: 52 seats (49.1%)
3	Anies Baswedan	Sandiaga Uno	Gerindra Party (15 seats); Prosperous Justice Party (11 seats); Total: 26 seats (24.5%)

== Campaign and issues ==
=== Racism ===
A candidate and a member of a minority ethnic group, Basuki has become the subject of occasional racist comments. During the 2017 gubernatorial campaign, he was regularly targeted by ultra-conservatives and supporters of rival candidates for being of Chinese descent. Furthermore, Basuki's "double minority" background makes him a target of the hardliner Islamic Defenders Front (FPI). The group called for the revision of the Jakarta Charter constitution to remove some of the governor's responsibilities for government-affiliated Islamic organizations.

=== Allegations of Quran insult ===
On 27 September 2016, in a speech in front of citizens of Thousand Islands, Ahok noted that some citizens would not vote for him because they are being "deceived using Verse 51 of Al-Ma'idah and variations of it," referring to a verse that some groups have cited as grounds to oppose him. The provincial government of Jakarta uploaded the video recording to YouTube in a channel which often feature Ahok's activities. Citizens and pundits criticized Ahok's statement, considering it an insult on the Quran. The video became popular and Ahok was widely criticized in social media such as Facebook and Twitter. A Change.org petition criticising him gained tens of thousands of signatures. Ahok was later convicted of blasphemy for the comment and sentenced to a two-year prison term.

=== Zakir Naik's visit ===
From 1 April to 10 April 2017, a controversial Indian preacher Zakir Naik came to Indonesia in preparation for a da'wah safari in several cities in Indonesia. On the evening of April 8, the Patriot Chandrabhaga Stadium in Bekasi, a suburb of Jakarta, was filled to its capacity of 20,000. Zakir Naik, who is facing probes in India, was on the podium. He reiterated what Indonesia’s conservative Islamic groups that had been rallying for in the run-up to Jakarta’s gubernatorial elections on April 19, that Indonesians should elect only a Muslim leader. An Indian newspaper The Hindu mentioned that there was "a correlation" with Zakir Naik's lecture in Indonesia which was broadcast via YouTube with the victory of Anies Baswedan, who outperformed Basuki Tjahaja Purnama and receiving 58% of the vote in the gubernatorial election.

== Opinion polls ==
=== First round ===
Poll source	Date	Sample size				Lead	Error margin
Poll source	Date	Sample size	Agus	Basuki	Anies	Lead	Error margin
Median	29 Jan – 2 Feb 2017	800	26.1%	29.8%	27.8%	2.0%	± 3.4%
Poltracking	29 Jan – 2 Feb 2017	800	25.75%	30.13%	31.50%	1.37%	± 3.46%
Populi Center	28 Jan – 2 Feb 2017	600	21.8%	40.0%	30.3%	9.7%	± 4.0%
Poltracking	24–29 Jan 2017	800	25.8%	30.1%	31.5%	1.4%	± 3.5%
Charta Politika	17–24 Jan 2017	767	25.9%	36.8%	27.0%	9.8%	± 3.5%
SMRC	14–22 Jan 2017	800	22.5%	34.8%	26.4%	8.4%	± 3.9%
Populi Center	14–19 Jan 2017	600	25.0%	36.7%	28.5%	8.2%	± 4.0%
Indikator	12–20 Jan 2017	808	23.6%	38.2%	23.8%	14.4%	± 3.8%
Lembaga Survei Indonesia	3–11 Dec 2016	800	26.5%	31.8%	23.9%	5.3%	± 3.5%
LSI Denny JA	1–6 Dec 2016	440	33.6%	27.1%	23.6%	6.5%	± 4.8%
Charta Politika	17–24 Nov 2016	733	29.5%	28.9%	26.7%	0.6%	± 3.5%
Indikator	15–22 Nov 2016	798	30.4%	26.2%	24.5%	4.2%	± 3.6%
Poltracking	7–17 Nov 2016	1200	19.2%	15.9%	14.3%	3.3%	± 2.8%
LSI Denny JA	31 Oct – 5 Nov 2016	440	32.3%	10.6%	31.9%	0.4%	± 4.8%
Indocon	18–30 Oct 2016	575	26.4%	30.1%	21.6%	3.7%	± 4.0%
Kedai KOPI	19–24 Oct 2016	694	21.0%	27.5%	23.9%	3.6%	± 4.0%
SMRC	1–9 Oct 2016	648	22.4%	45.4%	20.7%	23.0%	± 3.9%
Median	26 Sep – 1 Oct 2016	500	21.0%	34.2%	25.4%	8.8%	± 4.4%
Populi Center	25 Sep – 1 Oct 2016	600	15.8%	45.5%	23.5%	22.0%	± 4.0%
LSI Denny JA	26–30 Sep 2016	440	19.3%	31.4%	21.1%	10.3%	± 4.8%

=== Second round ===
Poll source	Date	Sample size			Lead	Error margin
Poll source	Date	Sample size	Basuki	Anies	Lead	Error margin
Median	21–27 Feb 2017	800	39.7%	46.3%	6.6%	± 3,4%
LSI Denny JA	27 Feb – 3 Mar 2017	440	40.5%	49.7%	9.2%	± 4.8%
SMRC	31 Mar – 5 Apr 2017	446	46.9%	47.9%	1.0%	± 4.7%
Median	1–6 Apr 2017	1,200	43.5%	49.8%	6.3%	± 2.9%
LSI Denny JA	7–9 Apr 2017	440	42.7%	51.4%	8.7%	± 4.8%
Charta Politika	7–12 Apr 2017	782	47.3%	44.8%	2.5%	± 3.5%
Indikator	12–14 Apr 2017	495	47.4%	48.2%	0.8%	± 4.5%
Median	13–14 Apr 2017	550	47.1%	49.0%	1.9%	± 4.2%

== Results ==
Candidate	Running mate	Party	First round		Second round	
Candidate	Running mate	Party	Votes	%	Votes	%
Anies Baswedan	Sandiaga Uno	Independent	2,197,333	39.95	3,240,987	57.96
Basuki Tjahaja Purnama	Djarot Saiful Hidayat	Indonesian Democratic Party of Struggle	2,364,577	42.99	2,350,366	42.04
Agus Harimurti Yudhoyono	Sylviana Murni	Democratic Party	937,955	17.05		
Total			5,499,865	100.00	5,591,353	100.00
Valid votes			5,499,865	98.84	5,591,353	98.97
Invalid/blank votes			64,448	1.16	58,075	1.03
Total votes			5,564,313	100.00	5,649,428	100.00
Registered voters/turnout			7,356,426	75.64	7,335,473	77.02
Source: First round (archived), Second round (archived)

== Aftermath ==
The racism and identity politics issue raised during the election had a prolonged effect on Jakartan society. As late as 2020, analysts noted that "the wound from the election had yet to heal". When Baswedan made a presidential run in 2024, he received less than 2% of the Christian vote, which was attributed to the use of identity politics in the 2017 election despite assurances from his running mate, Muhaimin Iskandar, that they will not employ identity politics in the presidential election.
