= Sidarto Danusubroto =

Indonesian politician and retired police officer

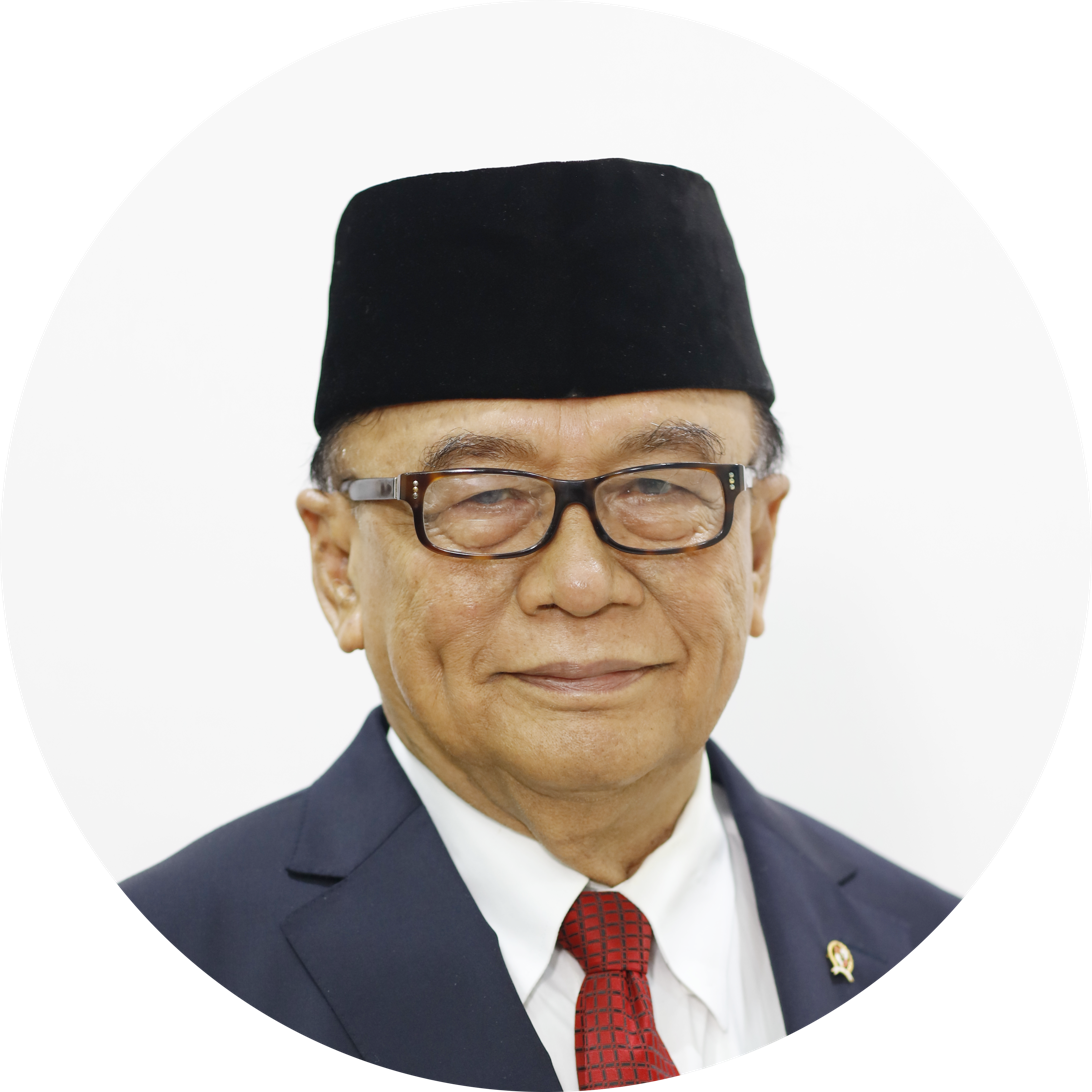

Member of Indonesia's Presidential Advisory Board
- In office 19 January 2015 – 20 October 2024
- President: Joko Widodo

13th Speaker of the People's Consultative Assembly
- In office 8 July 2013 – 1 October 2014
- President: Susilo Bambang Yudhoyono
- Deputy: Hajriyanto Y. Thohari; Melani Leimena Suharli; Ahmad Farhan Hamid; Lukman Hakim Saifuddin (2013–14); Achmad Dimyati Natakusumah (2014)
- Preceded by: Taufiq Kiemas
- Succeeded by: Zulkifli Hasan

Member of People's Representative Council
- In office 1 October 1999 – 30 September 2014
- President: B. J. Habibie; Abdurrahman Wahid; Megawati Sukarnoputri; Susilo Bambang Yudhoyono

Personal details
- Born: 11 June 1936 (age 90) Pandeglang, Dutch East Indies
- Party: PDI–P
- Spouse: Sri Artiwi Sidarto
- Children: 8

Sidarto Danusubroto (born 11 June 1936) is an Indonesian politician and a retired police officer, who is serving as a member of Indonesia's Presidential Advisory Board (Indonesian: Dewan Pertimbangan Presiden). A member of the Indonesian Democratic Party of Struggle, he previously served as speaker of the People's Consultative Assembly, from 2013 until 2014, following the death of Taufiq Kiemas.

== Early life, education, and early career ==
=== Early life and education ===
Sidarto Danusubroto was born in Pandeglang, Banten, on 11 June 1936. Sidarto attended SDN Yogyakarta in 1948, SMPN 1 Yogyakarta in 1952, SMAN 6 Yogyakarta in 1955, Police Science College (PTIK) in 1962, State Examination for Bachelor of Law in 1965, and Police Command and Staff College from 1969–1970, and the Joint Command and Staff School Bandung in 1977.

=== Adjutant to Sukarno ===
Sidarto became Sukarno's adjutant in 1967. Sidarto was adjutant, in the early days of Sukarno's fall because of the events of the March Eleven Order (Supersemar), that lead to the rise of Suharto and the beginning of the New Order, and when Sukarno was under house arrest at Wisma Yaso. Sidarto was given a message by Sukarno at that time. Sukarno said he could have been ostracized, separated from his family, and held to death. "But take note, To, soul, idea, ideology, and spirit cannot be killed," said Sidarto imitating Sukarno's message.

== Policing career ==
From 1974–1975 Sidarto served as the Tangerang Police Chief. A year later he served as Head of the Police Information Service (Kadispen). Then he became the Head of Interpol in Indonesia from 1976–1982, until he became the Head of Komapta from 1982–1985. Sidarto was recorded as the head of the regional police twice. First, as Chief of the Regional police for Southern Sumatra from 1986–1988, and Kapolda for West Java in 1988–1991.

== Political career ==
=== People's Representative Council ===
Sidarto retired from policing in 1991, and instead ventured into the private sector. In 1998, when the New Order regime fell, he returned to politics. Joining Sukarno's daughter, Megawati Sukarnoputri's Indonesian Democratic Party of Struggle (PDI-P), and was elected as a member of the People's Representative Council from the West Java VII electoral district.

He was re-elected to the People's Representative Council in 2004, and 2009. As a representative, he served as the Deputy Chairman of Commission I of the People's Representative Council. As Deputy Chairman, Sidarto was known to be focused and outspoken about state sovereignty. He firmly asked the Indonesian Armed Forces not to hesitate to sink a neighboring ship that was proven to have passed through and entered the country's territory.

In 2013, when Speaker of the People's Consultative Assembly Taufiq Kiemas died on 8 July 2013, Sidarto was chosen to replace Taufq. The decision is said to be a direct instruction from the party. Sidarto served as speaker of the People's Consultative Assembly until October 2014, when Taufiq's term would've ended.

=== Indonesian Presidential Advisory Board ===
In 2015, following the election and inauguration of Joko Widodo as the new president, replacing Susilo Bambang Yudhoyono, he was officially sworn in as a member of the Indonesian Presidential Advisory Board, a non-structural government agency, on 19 January 2015. He was again sworn in after Joko Widodo won re-election in 2019.

== Awards ==
- Star of the Republic of Indonesia Adipradana
- Bhayangkara Pratama Star
- Bhayangkara Naraya Star
- Satya Lancana Panca Warsa I
- Satya Lancana Panca Warsa II
- Satya Badge Military Operations Movement IV
- Satya Lancana Enforcer
- Satya Lancana Karya Bhakti

== Gallery ==
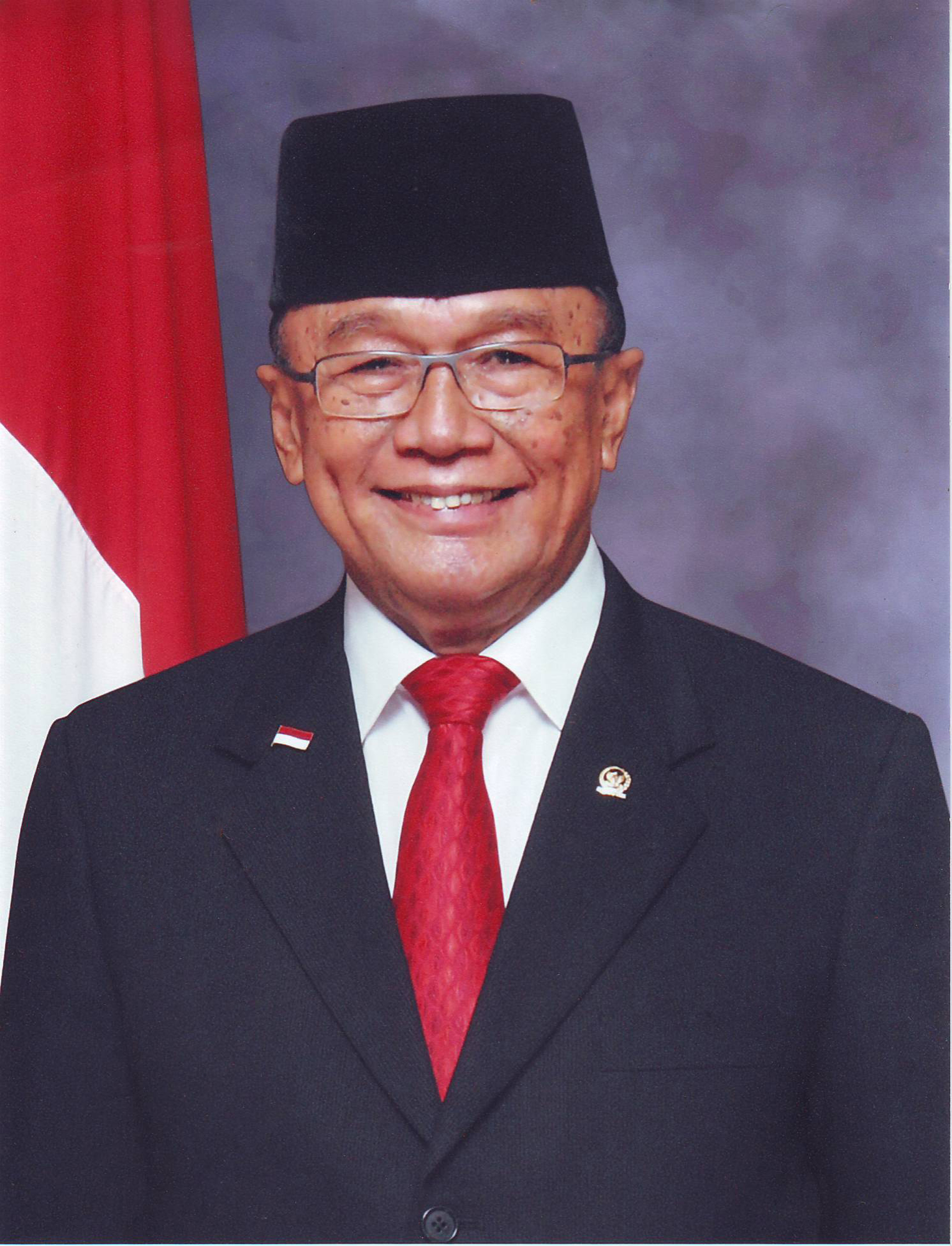
Sidarto Danusubroto as Speaker of the People's Consultative Assembly

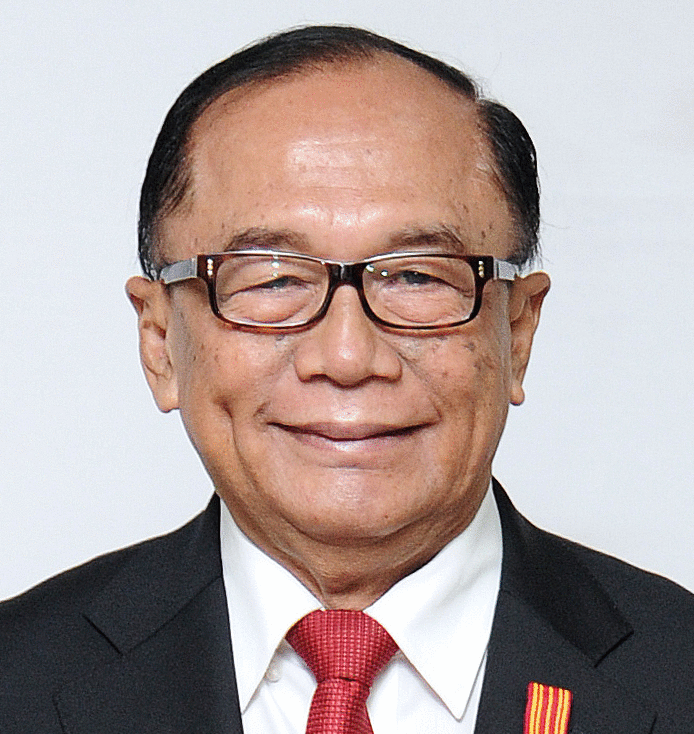
Sidarto Danusubroto as member of the Indonesian Presidential Advisory Board (2015)

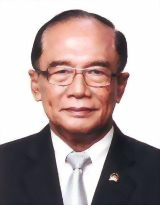
Another portrait of Sidarto Danusubroto as Speaker of the People's Consultative Assembly

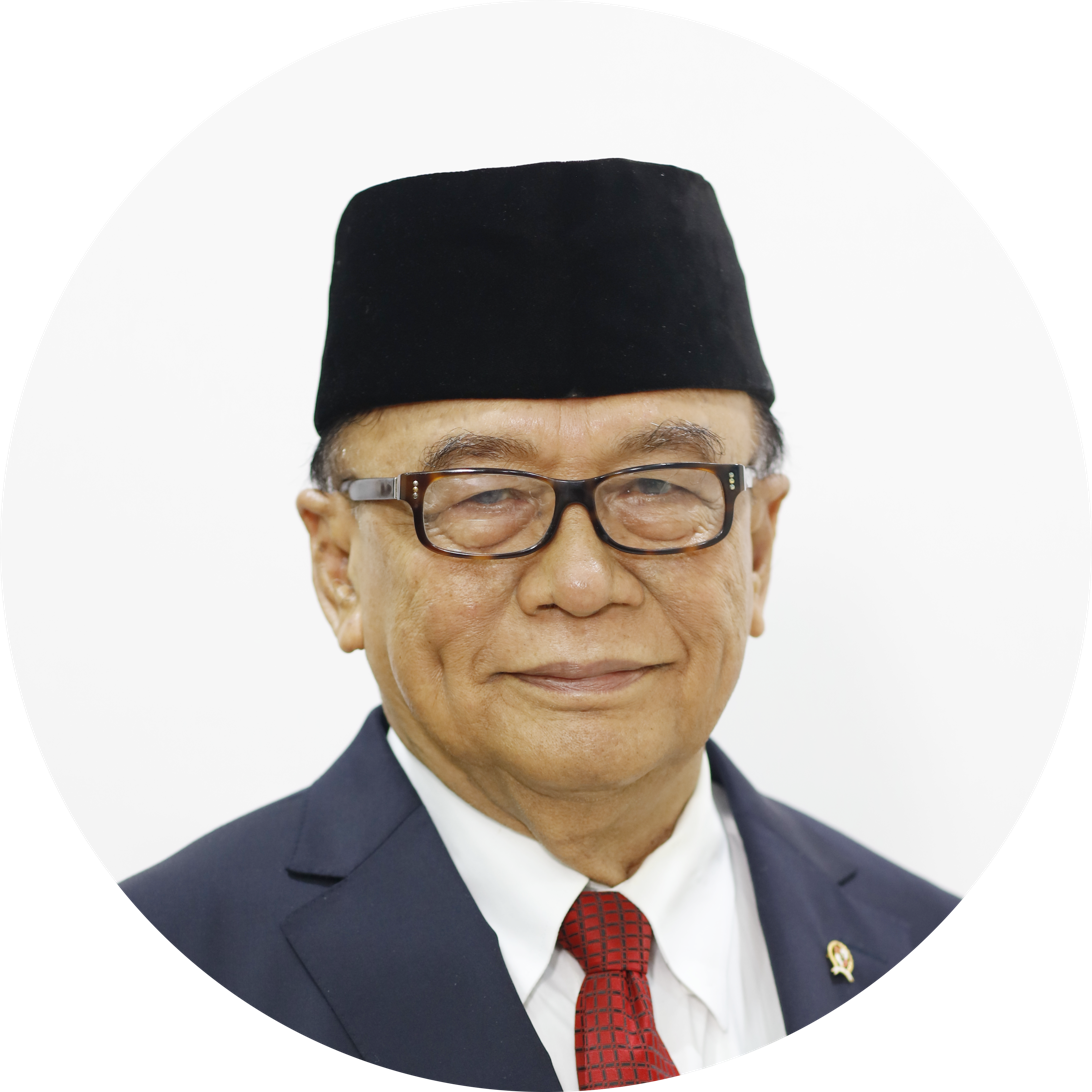
Sidarto Danusubroto as member of the Indonesian Presidential Advisory Board (2019)
