= Mely G. Tan =

Indonesian sociologist (1930–2024)

- Born: Mely Tan Giok Lan; 11 June 1930; Batavia, Dutch East Indies
- Died: 30 April 2024 (aged 93); Jakarta, Indonesia
- Education: University of Indonesia; Cornell University; University of California, Berkeley
- Known for: Studies on Chinese Indonesians
- Scientific career
- Fields: Sociology
- Thesis: Social Mobility and Assimilation: The Chinese in the United States (1968)
- Doctoral advisor: Wolfram Eberhard (main); Robert Blauner; Daniel Lev

Mely G. Tan
- Traditional Chinese: 陳玉蘭
- Simplified Chinese: 陈玉兰
Transcriptions
Standard Mandarin
- Hanyu Pinyin: Chén Yùlán
- Wade–Giles: Ch'en Yü-lan

Indonesian name
- Indonesian: Tan Giok-lan

Mely Tan Giok Lan (11 June 1930 – 30 April 2024), professionally known as Mely G. Tan, was an Indonesian sociologist. Tan obtained her bachelor's degree from the University of Indonesia, later receiving a scholarship to study at Cornell University. After finishing her doctorate at University of California, Berkeley, Tan returned to Indonesia and wrote extensively on economics and Chinese Indonesians. She was a founding commissioner of the National Commission on Violence against Women.

== Early life and studies ==
Tan was born on 11 June 1930 in Batavia, Dutch East Indies (now Jakarta, Indonesia), to a "probably fifth generation" Chinese father and second generation mother; she was the third of five siblings. As a child and teenager, she studied foreign languages, including Dutch, English, French, and German, speaking Dutch with her father and Indonesian with her mother. Education was important to the family, and her parents hired a governess to ensure the children completed their homework. Tan attended a Hollandsch Chineesche School, where she received high marks, and continued to a Hogere Burgerschool.

Tan studied for her bachelor's degree at the Department of Sinology at the University of Indonesia. In her third year, she entered a scientific writing competition that was organized by the Catholic Scientific Circle, winning the competition with her sociological field study. Tan later wrote that that was one of the factors that interested her in studying sociology formally; the contemporary focus on Chinese literature bored her.

When G. William Skinner arrived in Jakarta to study Chinese Indonesians, Tan was chosen as one of his three apprentices. Using the opportunity to study fieldwork and research methodology, Tan spent eighteen months in the position. Based on her work with him, Skinner chose Tan to receive the Cornell Southeast Asia Training Fellowship. Tan later graduated from the University of Indonesia in 1959.

In January 1959, Tan arrived in Ithaca, New York, to begin her studies at Cornell University. Despite slight culture shock, Tan enjoyed her studies, under the guidance of Skinner and the sociologist Robin Murphy Williams. Tan later described her time at Cornell as "some of the most intellectually and stimulating years" of her life. She received her Master of Arts in sociology in 1961, with her thesis based on her studies with Skinner. The thesis was published by the Cornell Modern Indonesia Project in 1963 as The Chinese of Sukabumi: A Study in Social and Cultural Accommodation.

After graduation, Tan returned to Jakarta to teach sociology at the Atma Jaya Catholic University of Indonesia, later becoming a researcher with the Center for Economic and Social Research of the Indonesian Council of Sciences (ICS, later renamed the Indonesian Institute of Sciences) in 1963. The ICS sent her to further her studies at the University of California, Berkeley, in August 1963. She later described this period as a time of great anxiety, as the political turmoil that Indonesia was experiencing – including a deteriorating economy and growing communist party – led many students to fear that their fellowships would be cancelled. During her studies at Berkeley, Tan participated in sit-ins as part of the Free Speech Movement, only stopping when warned that she could be deported if arrested.

Tan took her oral examination with Wolfram Eberhard, Herbert Blumer, Robert Blauner, Neil Smelser, and Daniel Lev as her examiners. After passing, Tan began work on her dissertation. Tan wrote her dissertation under the guidance of Eberhard, Blauner, and Lev, with approval given on 13 June 1968. Tan became the first Indonesian to receive a PhD in sociology from Berkeley as well as the first female Indonesian with a doctorate in sociology. The dissertation, Social Mobility and Assimilation: The Chinese in the United States, was later published in Taiwan in 1971. Tan noted that the students and professors seemed disinterested in Indonesian studies, and thus she had taken high-school students in San Francisco as her research subjects.

== Academic activities and activism ==
In August 1968, Tan returned to Indonesia. Within a few months, she had become head of a subdivision at the Indonesian Institute of Sciences. During this period, she also concentrated on advancing the teaching and study of sociology at the University of Indonesia. In the early 1970s, she became involved in discussions for the economic development of Indonesia. In an article in Tempo, Tan argued for development to use local materials, manufacturers, and equipment. Afterwards, Tan later took numerous jobs as a lecturer. From 1968 to 1997, Tan taught women's studies at the University of Indonesia. During the same period, she taught at the Jakarta Police Academy. She taught at the Center for Southeast Asian Studies at the University of Kyoto, Japan, from 1986 to 1987.

From 1997 to 2001, Tan served as the head of the research department at the Atma Jaya Catholic University of Jakarta. On 15 July 1998, responding to several days of rioting the previous May, Tan – together with activists including Saparinah Sadli, Mayling Oey-Gardiner, and Sinta Nuriyah – spoke with President B. J. Habibie regarding the need to prevent violence against women; the National Commission on Violence against Women was established later that year, with Tan serving as one of its commissioners between 1998 and 2003. Charles Coppel noted that, after the riots and the violence against Chinese Indonesians that resulted, Tan's academic studies of Chinese Indonesians shifted from explorations of assimilation to questions of discrimination. The writer Thung Ju Lan concurred, noting that two of Tan's post-1998 works explored the intersectionality of discrimination and promoted transitional justice to "put right ... discrimination in race, ethnicity, and religion."

As of 2008, Tan worked as a lecturer on police practices at the University of Indonesia. She was recognized for her scholarship on Chinese Indonesians, social stratification, and gender and development. She took the position that sociology should work together with economics and politics to promote development and allow for better understandings of cooperation. She opposed the practice of polygamy in Indonesia, arguing that a practice of "one woman one man" was – together with the provision of equal opportunities – part of substantial democracy.

Tan died at the Medistra Hospital in Jakarta, on 30 April 2024, at the age of 93.

== Recognition ==
Tan received six honorary medals from the government of Indonesia, including the Satyalancana Karya Satya and Bintang Mahaputra Pratama in 1995 and the Bintang Jasa Nararya in 2000. Atma Jaya University opened the Mely G. Tan reading room in her honour in 2008. A festschrift titled Multikulturalisme, Peran Wanita dan Integrasi Nasional (Multiculturalism, Women's Roles, and National Integration) was dedicated to her that year. In 2009, she received the Nabil Award for her contributions to Indonesian development through her research and publication activities. She was recognized by the newspaper Kompas with a Cendekiawan Berdedikasi Award for her dedication to academia in 2010.

== Selected publications ==
- The Chinese in Sukabumi (1963)
- The Chinese in the United States: Social Mobility and Assimilation (1971)
- The Social and Cultural Context of Family Planning in Indonesia (1971)
- Golongan Etnis Tionghoa di Indonesia ("The Ethnic Chinese of Indonesia", 1979)
- Perempuan Indonesia: Pemimpin Masa Depan ("Indonesian Women: Future Leaders", editor, 1991)
- Etnis Tionghoa di Indonesia: Kumpulan Tulisan ("The Ethnic Chinese in Indonesia: Collected Writings", 2008)
