= Taufiq Kiemas =

Indonesian politician (1942–2013)

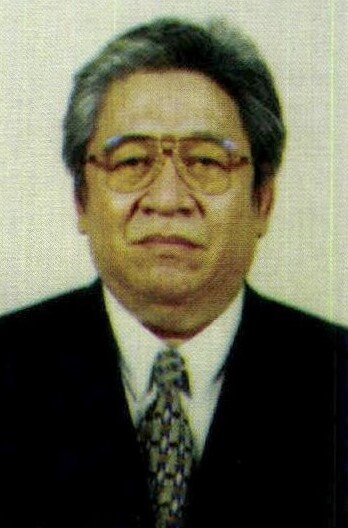
- Official portrait, c. 1999

12th Speaker of the People's Consultative Assembly
- In office 3 October 2009 – 8 June 2013
- Preceded by: Hidayat Nur Wahid
- Succeeded by: Sidarto Danusubroto

First Gentleman of Indonesia
- In role 23 July 2001 – 20 October 2004
- President: Megawati Sukarnoputri
- Preceded by: Sinta Nuriyah (as First Lady)
- Succeeded by: Ani Yudhoyono (as First Lady)

Second Gentleman of Indonesia
- In role 21 October 1999 – 23 July 2001
- Vice President: Megawati Sukarnoputri
- Preceded by: Hasri Ainun Habibie (as Second Lady)
- Succeeded by: Asmaniah Haz (as Second Lady)

Personal details
- Born: Muhammad Taufiq Kiemas; 31 December 1942 Jakarta, Japanese-occupied Dutch East Indies
- Died: 8 June 2013 (aged 70) Bukit Merah, Singapore
- Resting place: Kalibata Heroes' Cemetery
- Party: PDI-P
- Other political affiliations: PDI (until 1999)
- Spouse: Megawati Sukarnoputri (m. 1973)
- Children: Puan Maharani
- Parents: Tjik Agus Kiemas (father); Hamzathoen Roesyda (mother)
- Relatives: Sukarno (father-in-law); Fatmawati (mother-in-law)
- Education: Sriwijaya University
- Occupation: Politician; legislator
- Awards: Star of the Republic of Indonesia Adipradana

Muhammad Taufiq Kiemas (31 December 1942 – 8 June 2013) was an Indonesian politician who served as the Speaker of the People's Consultative Assembly of Indonesia from 2009 until his death in 2013. A member of the Indonesian Democratic Party of Struggle (PDI-P), he was the husband of party chairwoman Megawati Sukarnoputri, president of Indonesia from 2001 to 2004. He remains Indonesia's only first gentleman.

== Early life, education, and marriage ==
=== Early life and education ===
Taufiq was born to the couple Tjik Agus Kiemas and Hamzathoen Roesyda. His father was from South Sumatra (a Palembang descent), while his mother was of Minangkabau descent of West Sumatra-origin. He was the head of his mother's family in Tanah Datar, West Sumatra, with the title Datuk Basa Batuah. Taufiq was educated at the Faculty of Law of Sriwijaya University and was an active member of the Indonesian National Student Movement (GMNI), when he was a student.

=== Marriage ===
In 1973, he married Megawati Sukarnoputri, the daughter of Indonesia's first president, Sukarno. The marriage was Megawati's third marriage, and together they had a daughter, Puan Maharani, who is currently serving as the Speaker of the People's Representative Council. Taufiq also had two step-sons from Megawati's previous marriage.

== Political career ==
=== Early political career ===
Taufiq Kiemas started his political career when he was a student by joining the GMNI. He then joined the Indonesian Democratic Party and was elected as a member of the People's Representative Council in 1992. During the New Order era, his political career was largely castrated by the authorities.

=== Post-New Order ===
His career began to shine after the New Order regime was overthrown by students and the public in 1998. In the 1999 legislative election, the Indonesian Democratic Party of Struggle (PDI-P) came out victorious. This victory led his wife to become the Vice President of the Republic of Indonesia and then on 23 July 2001 became the fifth President of Indonesia replacing Abdurrahman Wahid after Wahid's mandate was revoked by the People's Consultative Assembly.

Now as one of the important figures in the party, he serves as Chairman of the Central Advisory Council, and was re-elected as a member of the People's Representative Council for the 2009–2014 period from the Electoral District of West Java II. Taufiq was the leader of the PDI-P's Muslim religious wing. He was a well-known participant in PDI-P affairs, often commenting on national matters such as preparations for the 2014 legislative and presidential elections in Indonesia and sometimes differing with his wife on certain issues concerning the management and leadership of the party.

== Health and death ==
Taufiq Kiemas suffered from heart and kidney problems. He had bypass surgery in Australia in 2000, another operation in 2005 to install a pacemaker, and another to replace the pacemaker battery. Taufiq had also been hospitalized on a number of occasions after the treatment.

Taufiq Kiemas died on 8 June 2013 in Singapore General Hospital, Singapore after a heart attack. The following day his body was flown back to Jakarta in an Indonesian Air Force Hercules cargo aircraft where he was given a full state funeral and buried at the Kalibata Heroes' Cemetery. The President of Indonesia, president Susilo Bambang Yudhoyono presided over the official ceremony which was attended by the senior members of Taufiq's family, the Indonesian Cabinet, and hundreds of leading political and national figures.

== Legacy ==
Taufiq wrote a number of books, most notably his biography, Gelora Kebangsaan Tak Kunjung Padam ("The National Spirit Remains Alive") which recounted both episodes of his life and his thoughts about various national issues. It was launched in December 2012 to celebrate his 70th birthday.

In 2021, Pekon Serai Airport in Pesisir Barat Regency, Lampung was renamed after him.

=== Awards ===
- 11 August 2011 – Star of the Republic of Indonesia Adipradana.
- 10 March 2013 – Honoris Causa Doctorate in Nationality and State by Trisakti University.

Political offices
Preceded by Hidayat Nur Wahid	Speaker of the People's Consultative Assembly; 2009–2013	Succeeded by Sidarto Danusubroto
Honorary titles
Preceded by Sinta Nuriyah as First Lady	First Gentleman of Indonesia; 23 July 2001 – 20 October 2004	Succeeded by Ani Yudhoyono as First Lady
Preceded by Hasri Ainun Habibie as Second Lady	Second Gentleman of Indonesia; 21 October 1999 – 23 July 2001	Succeeded by Asmaniah Haz as Second Lady
