= Mayling Oey-Gardiner =

Indonesian demographer

- Born: Mayling Oey; 25 February 1941 (age 85); Soekabumi, Dutch East Indies
- Education: Saint Xavier University; College of William & Mary; Harvard School of Public Health; Australian National University
- Known for: Studies on demography, gender
- Scientific career
- Fields: Sociology, demography
- Thesis: The Impact of Migration on Fertility: A Case Study of Transmigration in Lampung, Indonesia

Mayling Oey-Gardiner (born 25 February 1941) is an Indonesian demographer who has written extensively about the gender dimensions of poverty, labour, and education. Taught in the United States and Australia, Oey-Gardiner began teaching at the Faculty of Economics, University of Indonesia, in 1971. She was made a full professor in 2001.

== Early life and studies ==
Oey-Gardiner was born in Sukabumi, West Java, on 25 February 1941. She was the fourth child of Oey Jang Hwat (later known as Darmawan Wibowo) and Ong Pik Hwa, a reporter with the women's magazine Fu Len. Due to her mother's journalism, Oey's family moved around Java throughout the 1940s. She completed her elementary school studies at St. Theresa in Semarang, Central Java, in 1953. Having moved to Jakarta, she completed her secondary education at St. Ursula Catholic School. She later recalled that her mother expected all six of the children, regardless of sex, to learn basic skills such as cooking, sewing, and swimming.

When Oey-Gardiner was not accepted as a student of the Faculty of Psychology at the University of Indonesia, she took a clerical position with the affiliation office at the university's Faculty of Economics; this office was intended to facilitate the Ford Foundation's efforts to send Indonesian students abroad for their studies. In this position, Oey-Gardiner was responsible for typing and reproducing the course materials for the students.

In 1964, Oey-Gardiner departed for the United States on a Fulbright Scholarship. Intending at first only to improve her English skills, she took up sociology at St. Xavier College in Chicago, Illinois, receiving her degree in 1968. This was followed by two years studying at the College of William & Mary in Williamsburg, Virginia, She later recalled that, as she had failed to return to Indonesia immediately following the completion of her Fulbright Scholarship, she was almost deported before completing her studies. However, one of her lecturers secured a scholarship from William & Mary, from which she received a master's degree in sociology.

== Academic career ==
Oey-Gardiner returned to Indonesia by 1971, when she began teaching sociology at the University of Indonesia. She was sent to the Harvard School of Public Health in Cambridge, Massachusetts, for her post-graduate studies between 1972 and 1974. According to the newspaper Kompas, Oey-Gardiner began to focus on the gendered aspects of demographics after she was required to replace the sociologist Mely G. Tan at a conference in Dhaka, Bangladesh. After presenting her paper, "Rising Expectations but Limited Opportunities for Women in Indonesia", she began to investigate the gendered aspects of poverty, labour opportunities, and education.

Oey-Gardiner received the Ford–Rockefeller Population Research Grant in the late 1970s. This enabled her to complete her doctorate in demography from the Australian National University in 1982, with the dissertation The Impact of Migration on Fertility: A Case Study of Transmigration in Lampung, Indonesia. Oey-Gardiner established Insan Hitawasana Sejahtera, which provides consulting services for research projects, in 1991. As of 2012, she serves as both manager and senior researcher. She has also been involved in the Indonesian Academy of Sciences and the Centre for Strategic and International Studies.

On 15 July 1998, responding to several days of rioting the previous May, Oey-Gardiner – together with activists and academics including Mely G. Tan, Sinta Nuriyah, and Saparinah Sadli – spoke with President B. J. Habibie regarding the need to prevent violence against women; the National Commission on Violence against Women was established later that year. In a 1998 interview with Kompas, Oey-Gardiner received the opening of discourse about violence against women positively. She further expressed hope that improved education would reduce gender biases and make equal opportunities possible in the labour market.

In 2001, Oey-Gardiner became the first woman to be appointed full professor at the Faculty of Economics, University of Indonesia. At the time of her appointment, she delivered a speech titled "Mendobrak Langit-langit Kaca: Lambat, namun Tak Terelakkan" ('Shattering the Glass Ceiling: Slowly but Inexorably'), in which she challenged the claim that Indonesia was free of gender discrimination by exploring quantitative indicators of discriminatory practices in the country. She was elected chair of the university's academic senate in 2004.

Oey-Gardiner retired from the University of Indonesia in 2006; however, she continued to teach as a guest lecturer. As of 2012, she continues to conduct research, with a particular interest on poverty and gender issues as well as access to social services. For her continued dedication to scholarship, in 2016 she was one of three academics to receive a Cendekiawan Berdedikasi Award from the newspaper Kompas.

Oey-Gardiner married Peter Gardiner, a fellow student at the Australian National University, in 1982; they had a son, Conrad, in 1985. The couple collaborated on several projects together. Oey-Gardiner described Peter as better at "conceptualizing and designing studies or writing proposals", which she would then realize.

== Works cited ==
- Damanik, Caroline (27 June 2016). "'Kompas' Beri Penghargaan Kepada 3 Cendekiawan Pembawa Pencerahan" ['Kompas' Presents Award to Three Academics, Bringers of Englightenment]. Kompas (in Indonesian). Archived from the original on 1 July 2016.
- Martisasi, Fitrisia (18 October 1998). "Lebih Jauh dengan Mayling Oey-Gardiner" [Further with Mayling Oey-Gardiner]. Kompas (in Indonesian). p. 2.
- Napitupulu, Ester Lince (30 April 2024). "Perempuan Doktor Sosiologi Pertama Indonesia Berpulang" [Indonesia's First Female Doctor of Sociology has Passed]. Kompas (in Indonesian). Archived from the original on 30 April 2024.
- Ninuk MP; Maria H (20 October 2001). "Mayling Oei-Gardiner: Mendobrak Langit-Langit Kaca" [Mayling Oei-Gardiner: Shattering the Glass Ceiling]. Kompas (in Indonesian). p. 12.
- "Prof. Mayling Oey-Gardiner, Ph.D." (PDF) (in Indonesian). University of Indonesia. Archived from the original (PDF) on 9 December 2010.
- Setyautama, Sam; Mihardja, Suma, eds. (2008). "Oey May Ling". Tokoh-tokoh etnis Tionghoa di Indonesia [Ethnic Chinese Figures in Indonesia] (in Indonesian). Jakarta: Kepustakaan Populer Gramedia in collaboration with the Chen Xingchu Foundation. ISBN 978-979-9101-25-9.
- Tan, Mely G. (2012). "Oey-Gardiner, Mayling". In Suryadinata, Leo (ed.). Southeast Asian Personalities of Chinese Descent: Biographical Dictionary. Vol. 1. Singapore: Institute of Southeast Asian Studies. ISBN 978-981-4345-21-7.
