= Saparinah Sadli =

Indonesian psychologist (born 1927)

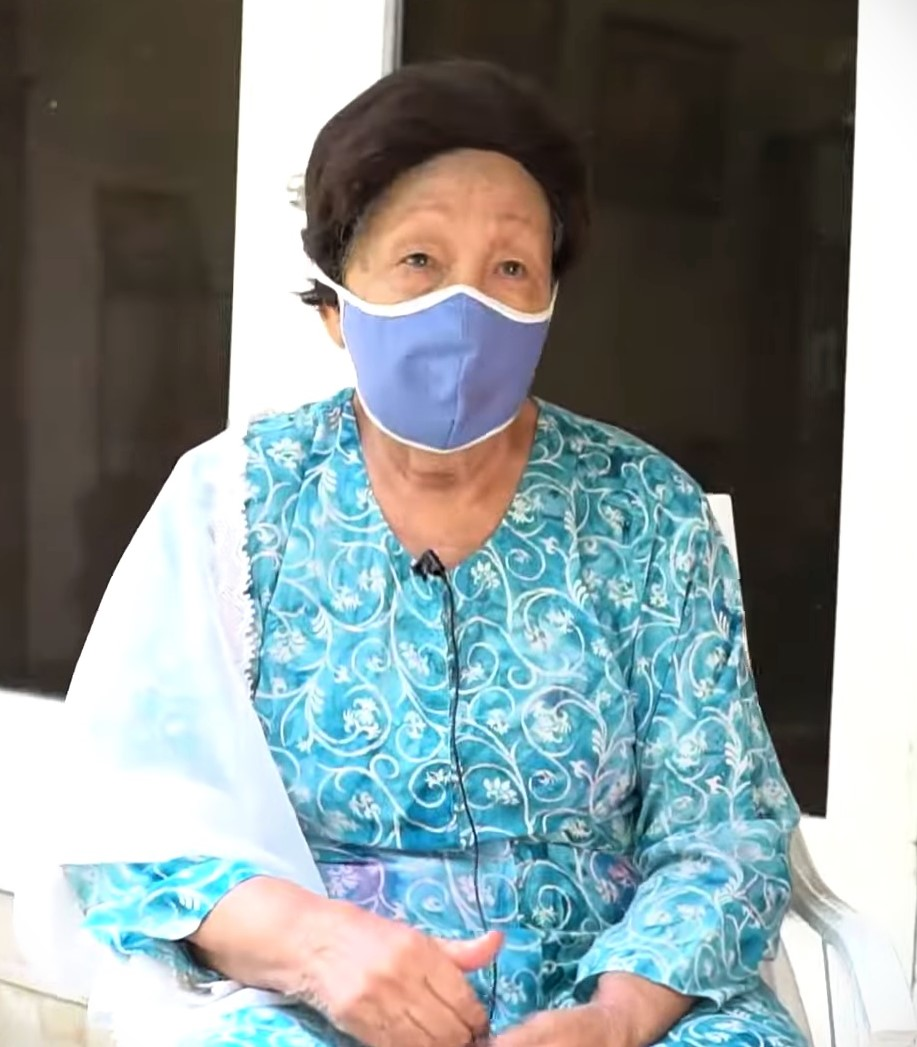
- Sadli speaks to Alzheimer Indonesia in 2020

Dean of the Faculty of Psychology of the University of Indonesia
- In office 1976 – 17 February 1981
- Preceded by: Fuad Hassan
- Succeeded by: Ashar Sunyoto Munandar

Personal details
- Born: 24 August 1926 (age 100) Central Java, Dutch East Indies
- Spouse: Mohammad Sadli (m. 1954; died 2008)
- Education: Gadjah Mada University; University of Indonesia
- Known for: Women's rights, activism

Academic background
- Thesis: Social perception on deviance (1977)
- Doctoral advisor: J. M. F. Jaspars

Academic work
- Discipline: Psychology, gender studies

Saparinah Sadli (born 24 August 1926) is an Indonesian psychologist and activist. She was a lecturer at the University of Indonesia and spearheaded the establishment of its Department of Women's Studies. A member of the National Commission on Human Rights from 1996 through 2000, she became the inaugural chairperson of the National Commission on Violence against Women in 1998. She has been awarded the Nabil Award, the Roosseno Award, the Cendekiawan Berdedikasi Award from Kompas, and a lifetime achievement award from Femina magazine.

== Early life and studies ==
Sadli was born in Central Java, Dutch East Indies (now Indonesia) on 24 August 1926. The daughter of a Javanese aristocrat, Sadli attended a Dutch-run school for Dutch and Dutch-speaking children. She then enrolled at the Deventer School – a school inspired by the writings of Kartini – though her studies were abbreviated by the Japanese invasion of 1942.

With her parents' support, Sadli attended the Faculty of Pharmacy, Gadjah Mada University, with the goal of becoming an assistant pharmacist. She graduated in 1953. Around this time she married Mohammad Sadli, and she joined him in the United States as he completed his studies in economics; he would later become an economist and policymaker, and the pair would remain married until his death on 9 January 2008. Returning to Indonesia, she decided to learn psychology. She received a degree from the Faculty of Psychology, University of Indonesia, in 1961.

Sadli received her doctorate after successfully defending her thesis, titled Social perception on deviance, on 7 February 1976. Two future psychology faculty deans, Soesmalijah Soewondo and Suprapti Sumarmo Markam, acted as paranymphs in her thesis defense. According to Kompas, her thesis was "arguably the first doctoral thesis in Indonesia which analyzes littering". Upon receiving her doctorate, she later took special interest in the psychology of women.

Sadli taught at the University of Indonesia, serving as the dean of the Faculty of Psychology between 1976 and 1981. She also worked with the National Population and Family Planning Board during the 1970s to promote women's reproductive rights. In 1985, Sadli was made a full professor at the University of Indonesia. She spoke in defence of the feminist writer Julia Suryakusuma, who had studied under Sadli in the 1970s, when the latter was detained by the State Intelligence Agency in 1988 for her gendered exploration of the New Order regime.

== Gender studies and activism ==
In the late 1980s, Sadli was approached by Sujudi, the rector of the University of Indonesia, to establish a women's studies program. She was initially hesitant, as the field was widely dismissed, and even through the 1990s Indonesians viewed the concepts of "feminism" and "gender" negatively. However, she complied, and the Department of Women's Studies at the University of Indonesia opened in 1990 with support from the university's postgraduate director Iskandar Wahidiyat. Saparinah served as the department's leader until 2000, navigating between those who viewed feminism negatively and the demands of activists who proudly accepted the feminist label.

Sadli was one of the academics who monitored Indonesia's implementation of the Convention on the Elimination of All Forms of Discrimination Against Women. As a member of the Convention Watch Working Group, established in 1994, she participated in a survey of respondents who were assumed to have been exposed to the convention; they found that, although most understood the concepts of discrimination, they attributed it to biological differences and had minimal knowledge of the convention itself. They promoted gender awareness, beginning with groups oriented toward women, but found it difficult to incorporate gender perspectives in development programs. Between 1996 and 2000, Sadli was a member of the National Commission on Human Rights.

On 15 July 1998, responding to several days of rioting the previous May, Sadli – together with activists and academics including Mely G. Tan, Mayling Oey-Gardiner, and Sinta Nuriyah – spoke with President B. J. Habibie regarding the need to prevent violence against women; the National Commission on Violence against Women was established later that year. Sadli became the commission's first chairwoman, serving from 1998 to 2004. During this period, the commission investigated acts of violence against women not only during the May 1998 riots, but also during military operations in East Timor, Papua, and Aceh.

As of 2017, Sadli was speaking out against the practice of child marriage in Indonesia. She also expressed support for the women farmers of Kendeng, Central Java, who were protesting the construction of a cement factory. By 2023, she was promoting the rights and welfare of the elderly, as they had been disproportionately affected by the COVID-19 pandemic. She had also contributed to schoolbooks on reproductive health.

== Awards and recognition ==
The Saparinah Sadli Award was established in 2002 to recognize activists whose work aligns with Sadli's vision. Sadli herself received the Nabil Award in 2011 for her contributions to nation-building, and in 2017, she received the Roosseno Award for her continued efforts to combat violence and discrimination against women. She declined an offer of the Bintang Mahaputera Adipradana, Indonesia's second highest award for civilians. She was recognized by the newspaper Kompas with a Cendekiawan Berdedikasi Award for her dedication to academia. In 2023, in recognition of Sadli's academic endeavours, the scope of the Sadli Lecture – initiated by the University of Indonesia in conjunction with the Australian National University to commemorate Sadli's late husband – was expanded to cover gender issues. That year, Sadli received a lifetime achievement award from Femina magazine.

== Works cited ==
- Liswijayanti, Faunda (5 May 2023). "3 Wanita Hebat Ini Raih Penghargaan 50 Persona Femina Kategori Lifetime Achievement" [These 3 Great Women Receive Lifetime Achievement Awards in Femina's 50 Leaders]. Femina (in Indonesian). Archived from the original on 2 May 2024.
- Napitupulu, Ester Lince (30 April 2024). "Perempuan Doktor Sosiologi Pertama Indonesia Berpulang" [Indonesia's First Female Doctor of Sociology has Passed]. Kompas (in Indonesian). Archived from the original on 30 April 2024.
- Pambudy, Ninuk M (30 August 2023). "Ulang Tahun Ke-97 Saparinah Sadli" [Saparinah Sadli's 97th Birthday]. Kompas (in Indonesian). Archived from the original on 2 May 2024.
- "Sadli Lecture 2023". Crawford School of Public Policy. Archived from the original on 2 May 2024.
- Sadli, Saparinah (2002). "Feminism in Indonesia in an International Context". In Kathryn May Robinson; Sharon Bessell (eds.). Women in Indonesia: Gender, Equity and Development. Singapore: Institute of Southeast Asian Studies. pp. 80–91. ISBN 9789812301598.
- "Saparinah Sadli Selalu Dalam Proses Menjadi" [Saparinah Sadli Always in the Process of Becoming]. Kompas (in Indonesian). 5 May 2023. Archived from the original on 7 December 2021.
- "Selamat Ulang Tahun ke-97 Prof. Dr. Saparinah Sadli (Dekan Fakultas Psikologi UI 1976-1981 dan Guru Besar Purnabakti Fakultas Psikologi UI)" [Happy 97th Birthday Prof. Dr. Saparinah Sadli (Dean of the Faculty of Psychology, UI, 1976–1981 and Professor Emeritus of the Faculty of Psychology UI)] (in Indonesian). University of Indonesia. 24 August 2023. Archived from the original on 30 November 2023.
- Simanjuntak, Tertiani ZB (24 August 2016). "Saparinah Sadli - The Golden Years". The Jakarta Post. Archived from the original on 16 July 2017.
- Suryakusuma, Julia (12 October 2011). "Saparinah Sadli: A feminist transformation". The Jakarta Post. Archived from the original on 23 June 2012.
- Ulung, A. Kurniawan (25 July 2017). "Saparinah Sadli continues to fight for justice". The Jakarta Post. Archived from the original on 28 July 2017.
- "Membuang sampah ke sungai/selokan termasuk perilaku menyimpang". Kompas. 26 February 1976. p. 4.
