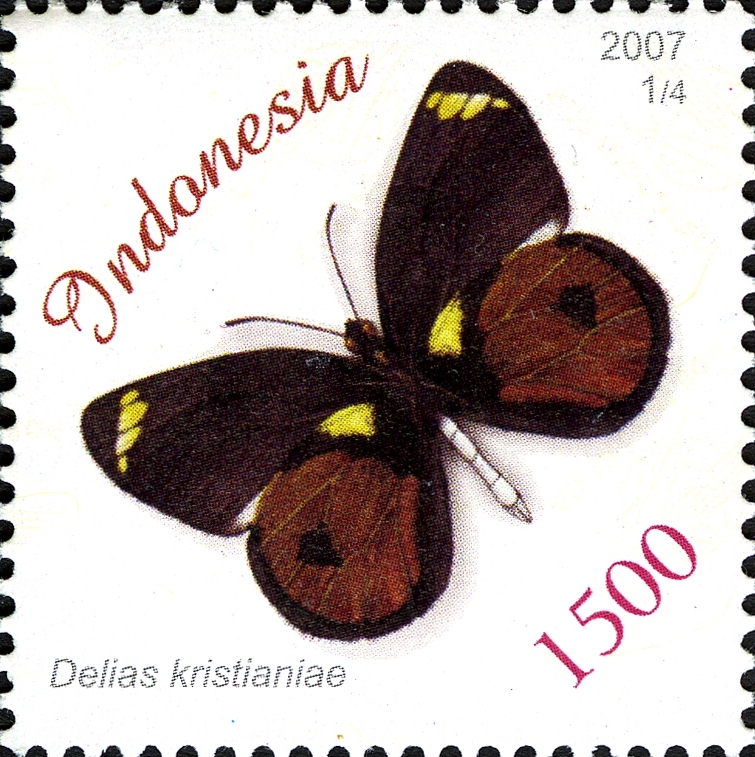

Scientific classification
- Kingdom: Animalia
- Phylum: Arthropoda
- Class: Insecta
- Order: Lepidoptera
- Family: Pieridae
- Genus: Delias
- Species: D. kristianiae

Binomial name
- Delias kristianiae van Mastrigt, 2006

= Delias kristianiae =

Delias kristiniae

Species of butterfly

Delias kristianiae is a rare Papuan butterfly that is named after the former First Lady of Indonesia, Kristiani Herrawati. Kristiani Herrawati was presented with a specimen of D. kristianiae after the species was named, which she donated to a museum.
