= Mohammad Sadli =

Indonesian economist

Prof. Dr. Ir. Mohammad Sadli
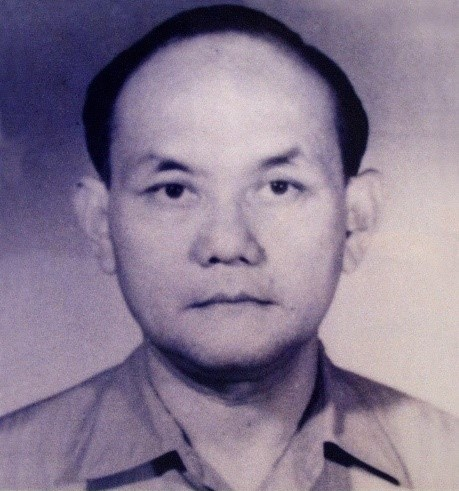

6th Minister of Mining
- In office 28 March 1973 – 28 March 1978
- President: Suharto
- Preceded by: Sumantri Brodjonegoro
- Succeeded by: Subroto

13th Minister of Manpower
- In office 11 September 1971 – 28 March 1973
- President: Suharto
- Preceded by: Mursalin Daeng Mamangung
- Succeeded by: Subroto

Personal details
- Born: 10 June 1922 Sumedang, West Java, Dutch East Indies
- Died: 8 January 2008 (aged 85) Jakarta, Indonesia
- Spouse: Saparinah Sadli
- Education: University of California, Berkeley; Massachusetts Institute of Technology; Gadjah Mada University
- Profession: Economist

Mohammad Sadli (10 June 1922 – 8 January 2008) was a leading Indonesian policymaker and economist.

Sadli, as he was widely known, was born in Sumedang, West Java. He first studied in the Hollandsch-Inlandsche School (HIS) in Sumedang and Subang and later moved to the Hogere Burger School (HBS) in Semarang in Central Java. He then (1952) took university studies at the Technical Faculty, Gadjah Mada University, in Yogyakarta.

Between 1954 and 1956, Sadli worked towards his Master of Science in economics at MIT in the United States before proceeding to post-graduate studies in economics at the University of California, Berkeley in 1956. He returned to Indonesia in 1957 where he became Director of the Economics and Management Institute (LPEM) at the University of Indonesia.

== Career in government ==
Sadli worked at the Indonesian Chamber of Commerce and Industry and was a key economic adviser in the New Order government. He was one of five prominent economic advisers who became known as the Berkeley Mafia during the Soeharto era working closely with Professor Widjojo Nitisastro. In 1967 he was appointed by Suharto as the first chair of the Indonesian Investment Coordination Board. Between 1971–73 he served as Minister for Manpower and then in 1973-78 he was Minister for Mines in the Second Development Cabinet.

== After retirement ==
After his retirement as a minister in 1978, Sadli became widely regarded as one of the most senior policy-oriented economists in Indonesia. He remained a key adviser to Soeharto, he fostered his many links in business circles, and he became an active economic journalist. As an economic commentator, Sadli made important contributions to public policy discussion in Indonesia throughout the 1980s and 1990s and until the time of his death. Because he was so well known and respected he could chide or praise almost anybody in public life at will, and he often did so with gentle good humour in the numerous columns that he wrote for the Indonesian publication Business News and other Indonesian publications. He was one of the first senior figures in Indonesia to become openly critical of the Soeharto regime. The most consistent theme in his public commentary was the need for good economic policy.

Sadli took a close interest in international economic affairs as well. He often participated in seminars and conferences about economic affairs in meetings in Asia. He was appointed several times, in 1981 and again in 1987, as an expert member of international panels to undertake strategic reviews of the role of the Asian Development Bank in Asia.

Sadli died at the home where he had lived for many years in the suburb of Kebayoran in South Jakarta on 8 January 2008. He is survived by his wife, Professor Saparinah Sadli, who is a leading figure in Indonesia for her work in the fields of psychology and women's rights.

== Sadli lecture series ==
The Institute of Economic and Social Research of the Faculty of Business and Economics at the University of Indonesia (LPEM FEB UI) and ANU Indonesia Project hosts an annual lecture series titled “The Sadli Lecture Series in Economic Policy”. Starting in 2023, the Sadli Lecture is also dedicated to his wife Saparinah.

== Sadli Foundation ==
In June 2019 the Sadli Foundation (Yayasan Sadli) was established to encourage the activities of new professors in the Faculty of Economics and Business at the University of Indonesia. The Foundation will provide funds for research grants to support high-quality research. The Foundation was officially established on 14 June 2019 at a meeting attended by Sadli's wife, Emeritus Professor Saparinah Sadli, and senior staff from the Faculty of Economics and Business including the Dean of the Faculty, Professor Ari Kuncoro, the Dean of the Institute for Economic and Social Research, Dr Riatu Qibtiyah, and other well-known senior scholars from the University such as Emeritus Professor Mayling Oey-Gardiner and former Minister of Finance Dr M. Chatib Basri.
