= National Commission on Violence against Women =

Indonesian women's rights organization

- Komisi Nasional Anti Kekerasan terhadap Perempuan
- Nickname: Komnas Perempuan
- Formation: October 15, 1998; 27 years ago
- Type: Independent government-funded organization
- Official language: Indonesian
- Funding: Indonesian government, private donors
- Website: komnasperempuan.go.id

The National Commission on Violence against Women (Indonesian: Komisi Nasional Anti Kekerasan terhadap Perempuan, commonly abbreviated as Komnas Perempuan) is an Indonesian independent state institution established in 1998 with the goal of eliminating violence against women. It is one of three such institutions, the other two being the National Commission on Human Rights (Komisi Nasional Hak Asasi Manusia, founded 1993) and the Indonesian Child Protection Commission (Komisi Perlindungan Anak Indonesia, founded 2002).

== History ==
The Commission was established on 15 October 1998 based on Presidential Decree no. 181/1998 during the administration of B. J. Habibie, the first president who took office during the Post-Suharto era in Indonesia. It was created following demands by civil society in Indonesia after the sexual violence which took place during the May 1998 riots of Indonesia. In fact, civil society groups had been calling for such an organization for several years. The human rights activist Saparinah Sadli was a key figure in the establishment of the Commission. The first proposal for the organization was to establish it under the Minister of State for Women's Affairs, with First Lady Hasri Ainun Habibie sitting on its board; this was rejected by civil society organizations. A further proposal to create a more independent Commission was considered more acceptable.

The Commission was established with two main goals: to develop conditions that are conducive to eliminating all forms of violence against women and upholding women's human rights in Indonesia; and to improve efforts to prevent and overcome all forms of violence against women and protect women's human rights. To achieve these goals, the organization observes, writes reports to influence policy, helps build infrastructure and supports the work of other organizations. The Commission receives funding from the national budget through the State Expenditure and Expenditure Budget (Anggaran Pengeluaran dan Belanja Negara, APBN) as well as from private donors. The Commission has a chair, up to two vice chairs, up to nineteen members and a Special Rapporteur.

The Commission's regulations were amended by Presidential Regulations No. 65 and 66 of 2005 during the term of Susilo Bambang Yudhoyono. Its mandate was clarified as encompassing the following four elements: 1) carrying out studies and research; 2) monitoring and finding facts and documenting all forms of violence against women; 3) providing advice and considerations to the government, legislative and judiciary institutions as well as community organizations to encourage the preparation and ratification of legal and policy frameworks that support efforts to prevent and overcome all forms of violence against women; and 4) developing regional and international cooperation to increase efforts to prevent and overcome all forms of violence against Indonesian women. In the years since its establishment, it has worked towards those goals, devoting resources to research and education and advocating on matters of gender, sexuality and women's rights at the national level.

== Notable people ==
- Azriana Manalu, former Chair
- Mely G. Tan, commissioner (1998–2003)
- Saparinah Sadli, first chairperson (1998–2004)
- Sinta Nuriyah, commissioner (1998–2003)

== Works cited ==
- Rekam Juang Komnas Perempuan: 16 Tahun Menghapus Kekerasan terhadap Perempuan [Record of the Struggle of the National Commission on Violence against Women: 16 Years Eliminating Violence against Women] (in Indonesian). Jakarta: National Commission on Violence against Women. 2014. ISBN 978-979-26-7587-0.
