= Kalibata Heroes' Cemetery =

Military cemetery in Jakarta

National Main Heroes' Cemetery in Kalibata
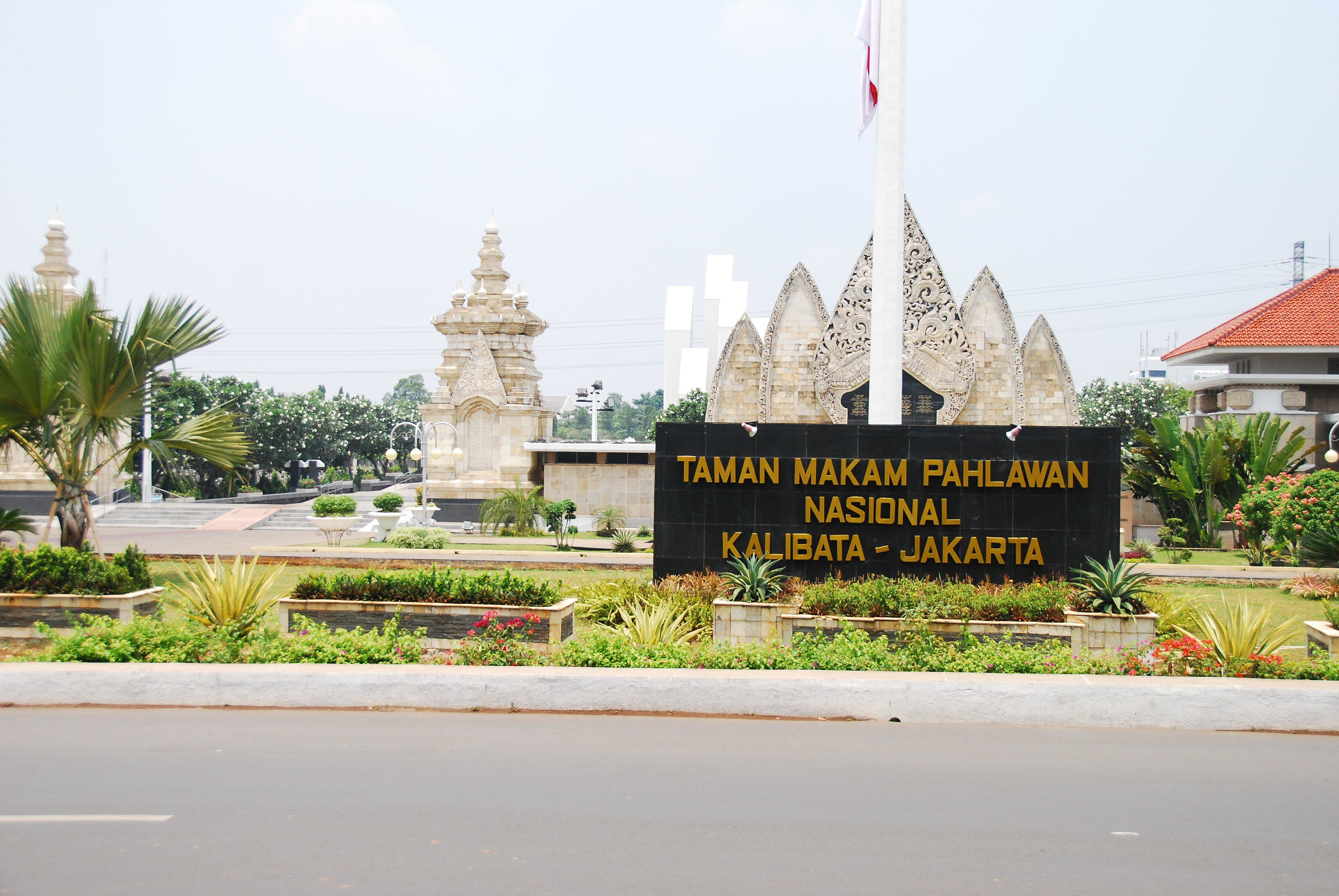
- Front gate of Kalibata Heroes' Cemetery
- Interactive map of National Main Heroes' Cemetery in Kalibata

Details
- Established: 10 November 1954
- Location: Kalibata, South Jakarta
- Country: Indonesia
- Coordinates: 6°15′26″S 106°50′46″E
- Owned by: Indonesian Government
- Size: 23 hectares (57 acres)
- No. of graves: 10,105 (August 2020)

The National Main Heroes' Cemetery in Kalibata (Indonesian: Taman Makam Pahlawan Nasional Utama Kalibata), colloquially known as Kalibata Heroes' Cemetery (Indonesian: Taman Makam Pahlawan Kalibata or TMP Kalibata), is a military cemetery in Kalibata, South Jakarta, Indonesia. It was built in 1953 and opened on 10 November 1954. Former Indonesian foreign minister Agus Salim, who died six days before the cemetery was opened, was the first senior politician buried in the cemetery. There were also 121 bodies moved from Heroes' Cemetery in Ancol. B. J. Habibie was the first and as of 2025 only Indonesian president to be buried in the cemetery following his death on 11 September 2019. At the other hand, five vice presidents—all of whom served under President Suharto, including Habibie—were buried there; Adam Malik was the first in 1984 and Try Sutrisno was the most recent in 2026.

The site was established as Heroes' Cemetery in Kalibata (Taman Makam Pahlawan Kalibata) before Suharto renamed it in his 1976 decree to National Heroes' Cemetery in Kalibata (Taman Makam Pahlawan Nasional Kalibata). The graveyard was then renamed to its current form in 2009, following the passage of Law 20/2009.

More than 7,000 military casualties and veterans from the Indonesian War of Independence are buried there. This includes many veterans of the Imperial Japanese Army who stayed in the Dutch colony after World War II of their own free will and fought for Indonesian independence.

== Burial criteria ==
Act No. 20 of 2009, which regulates the orders, decorations, and medals of Indonesia, also regulates the eligibility for burial in the cemetery. Before the promulgation of the Act, anyone with the consent of the Ministry of Social Affairs could be buried in the cemetery; after its promulgation, only the following people may be buried there:

- People designated as a National Hero of Indonesia; or
- Recipients of the Star of the Republic of Indonesia or the Star of Mahaputra.

== Japanese ==
Up to 3,000 Japanese volunteers fought against the Dutch. Of these approximately 1,000 died, 1,000 returned to Japan after Indonesia's independence, and 1,000 remained and were naturalized in Indonesia. Japanese Prime Minister Junichiro Koizumi visited on 13 January 2002, Prime Minister Shinzo Abe visited on 21 August 2007, and Prince Akishino and Princess Akishino visited on 19 January 2008.

Since the late 20th century, every Japanese leader or ambassador who visited Jakarta would visit the cemetery. Emperor Naruhito and Empress Masako visited the Cemetery on 20 June 2023.

== Notable people buried in the cemetery ==
Indonesians

- B. J. Habibie (3rd president of Indonesia, 7th vice president of Indonesia)
- Adam Malik (3rd vice president of Indonesia)
- Umar Wirahadikusumah (4th vice president of Indonesia)
- Sudharmono (5th vice president of Indonesia)
- Try Sutrisno (6th vice president of Indonesia, former Republic of Indonesia Armed Forces commander 1988-1993)
- Ali Sastroamidjojo (former prime minister of Indonesia)
- Djuanda Kartawidjaja (former prime minister of Indonesia)
- Sutan Sjahrir (former prime minister of Indonesia)
- Taufiq Kiemas (First Gentleman of Indonesia, 2001–2004; Speaker of the People's Consultative Assembly 2009–2013)
- Harun Al Rasyid Zain (former Minister of Manpower and Transmigration)
- Halim Perdanakusuma (national hero of Indonesia)
- Hasri Ainun Habibie (First Lady of Indonesia, 1998–1999)
- Ani Yudhoyono (First Lady of Indonesia, 2004–2014)
- Firman Gani (former Jakarta Metropolitan Police chief)
- Ahmad Yani (commander of Indonesian Army, 1962–1965; victim of 30 September Movement)
- R. Soeprapto (victim of 30 September Movement)
- Mas Tirtodarmo Haryono (victim of 30 September Movement)
- Siswondo Parman (victim of 30 September Movement)
- D. I. Pandjaitan (victim of 30 September Movement)
- Sutoyo Siswomiharjo (victim of 30 September Movement)
- Karel Satsuit Tubun (victim of 30 September Movement)
- Rudini (former Indonesian home minister, former Chief of Staff of the Indonesian Army 1983-1986)
- Saleh Basarah (former Chief of Staff of the Indonesian Air Force)
- Ashadi Tjahjadi (former Chief of Staff of the Indonesian Air Force)
- Suwiryo (1st and 3rd Mayor of Jakarta, former deputy prime minister of Indonesia)
- Ali Murtopo (prominent general and Minister for Information)
- Achmad Tahir (former Minister of Tourism, Post, and Telecommunications)
- Agus Salim (former Indonesian foreign minister)
- Ruslan Abdulgani (former Permanent Representative of Indonesia to the United Nations, former Indonesian foreign minister)
- Maria Ulfah Santoso (women's rights activist and first female to become Indonesian cabinet member)
- John Lie (national hero of Indonesia)
- L. B. Moerdani (former Indonesian defence minister, former Republic of Indonesia Armed Forces commander)
- Ali Alatas (former Indonesian foreign minister)
- Ibnu Sutowo (former Indonesian energy minister)
- Edi Sudradjat (former Indonesian defence minister, former Republic of Indonesia Armed Forces commander, former commander of Indonesian Army)
- Feisal Tanjung (former Coordinating Minister of Political and Security Affairs of Indonesia, former Republic of Indonesia Armed Forces commander 1993-1998)
- Makmun Murod (former commander of Indonesian Army)
- Poniman (former Indonesian defence minister, former commander of Indonesian Army)
- Abdul Haris Nasution (former Chief of Staff of the Republic of Indonesia War Forces, former Speaker of the Provisional People's Consultative Assembly)
- A. A. Baramuli (former chair of the Supreme Advisory Council)
- Johanna Masdani (participant during the 1928 Youth Pledge)
- Widjojo Nitisastro (former Coordinating Minister of Economics, Finance, and Industry of Indonesia)
- Sayuti Melik (typist of the Proclamation of Indonesian Independence text)
- S. K. Trimurti (former Indonesian labour minister, Sayuti Melik's wife)
- Radius Prawiro (former Coordinating Minister of Economics, Finance, Industry, and Development Supervision of Indonesia)
- Ernest Douwes Dekker (national hero of Indonesia)
- Agus Wirahadikusumah (former commander of Kostrad)
- B.M. Diah (former Minister of Information of the Republic of Indonesia)
- Herawati Diah (B.M. Diah's wife)
- Rasuna Said (national hero of Indonesia)
- Andi Mappetahang Fatwa (deputy speaker of the People's Consultative Assembly, 2004–2009)
- Alimin (national movement activist)
- Hasan Basri Durin (former Indonesian Agrarian Affairs state minister)
- Johannes Abraham Dimara (national hero of Indonesia for integration of Western New Guinea)
- Maulwi Saelan (former chair of the Football Association of Indonesia, former Indonesian sports minister)
- I Gusti Putu Danny Nugraha Karya (head of Papua Regional State Intelligence Agency, killed in action in 2021)

Japanese

- Rahmat Shigeru Ono, Japanese army defector

== See also ==
- Arlington National Cemetery
- Babaoshan Revolutionary Cemetery
- Yasukuni shrine
- Libingan ng mga Bayani
- Giri Tunggal Heroes' Cemetery
- Kusumanegara Heroes' Cemetery
