= Fuad Hassan =

Indonesian politician (1929–2007)

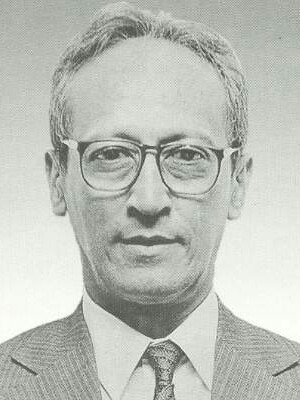

19th Minister of Education and Culture
- In office 3 June 1985 – 17 March 1993
- President: Soeharto
- Preceded by: Nugroho Notosusanto
- Succeeded by: Wardiman Djojonegoro

Dean of the Faculty of Psychology of the University of Indonesia
- In office 1973–1976
- Preceded by: Slamet Iman Santoso
- Succeeded by: Saparinah Sadli

Personal details
- Born: 26 June 1929 Semarang, Central Java, Dutch East Indies
- Died: 7 December 2007 (aged 78) Jakarta, Indonesia

Fuad Hassan (Arabic: فؤاد حسن Fu'ād Ḥasan; 26 June 1929 – 7 December 2007) was an Indonesian politician.

== Biography ==
=== Early life and education ===
Fuad Hassan was born in Semarang on 26 June 1929. His father, Ahmad Hassan, was a businessman and trader of Arabic heritage. Hassan is a Hadrami surname that's common in some Arab-Indonesian neighborhoods like Pasar Kliwon. In the 1950s, Fuad Hassan moved to the capital city, Jakarta, to study psychology in the University of Indonesia. Graduating in 1958, Fuad continued his educational journey to Canada, studying a post-graduate course in Philosophy and Psychology in the University of Toronto until 1962. In 1967, he obtained a PhD in psychology and in 1990, obtained what is called a Doctor Honoris Causa in Politics from Kyungnam University, Seoul and in Philosophy from Universiti Kebangsaan, Kuala Lumpur.

=== Political career ===
Other than his educational career, Fuad Hassan also pursued his opportunity in politics. From 1976 to 1980, Fuad Hassan became Ambassador of Indonesia to Egypt, residing in his residential place in Cairo. His diplomatic task also encompassed surrounding areas such as Sudan, Somalia, and Djibouti.

After his post as ambassador, Fuad became Head of Research and Development for the Foreign Ministry Department of Indonesia until 1985. While holding this position, he held a chair for the Indonesian People's Consultative Assembly from 1982. In 1985, Fuad became the Minister of Education and Culture. His tenure ended in 1993, after which he became a member of the Supreme Advisory Council until 1998. In addition, he served as a member of the Asia Europe Foundation representing Indonesia.

=== Later life and death ===
Since October 2006, Fuad Hassan suffered from complications of diabetic, heart and lung diseases. He was treated at RS Jantung Harapan Kita, National University Hospital (Singapore) and RS Cipto Mangunkusumo. At 3:40 pm on 7 December 2007, he died at the Cipto Mangunkusumo Hospital in Jakarta at the age of 78. He was buried in Kalibata Heroes' Cemetery.

== Books ==
- "Neurosis sebagai Konflik Existensial", disertasi, Universitas Indonesia, Jakarta, 1967.
- "Kita and Kami; The Two Basic Modes of Togetherness", Bhratara, Jakarta,1975 (2nd pr.1989).
- "Berkenalan dengan Existensialisme", Pustaka Jaya, Jakarta, 1973, (cet. ke-5 1992).
- "Apologia" terjemahan karya Plato disertai pengantar tentang filsafat Yunani, Bulan Bintang, Jakarta,1973 (cet.ke-3,1986).
- Pengalaman Seorang Haji", Bulan Bintang, Jakarta, 1974, (cet. ke-3 1986).
- "Heteronomia", Pustaka Jaya, Jakarta, 1977 (cet. ke-2 1992).
- "Dasacarita dari Hongaria", kumpulan terjemahan 10 cerita pendek dari Hongaria, Grafiti Pers, Jakarta, 1985 (cet. Ke-3 1987) (cet. ke-2 1986).
- "Renungan Budaya", kumpulan catatan perihal beberapa masalah budaya,

Balai Pustaka, Jakarta, 1988, (cet. ke-5 1993).

- "Dimensi Budaya dan Sumberdaya Manusia", Balai Pustaka, Jakarta, 1992.
- "Manusia dan Citranya", Aries Lima, Jakarta, 1986, (cet.ke-2 1991).
- "Pulang", terjemahan himpunan cerita pendek karya Arpad Goncz "Homecoming", disertai uraian pengantar, Grafiti Pers, Jakarta, 1994).
- "Pentas Kota Raya"; sketsa perikehidupan di kotabesar, Pustaka Jaya, Jakarta, 1995.
- "Pengantar Filsafat Barat", Pustaka Jaya, Jakarta, 1996.
