= Star of the Republic of Indonesia =

Highest award of honor of Indonesia

Star of the Republic of Indonesia Bintang Republik Indonesia
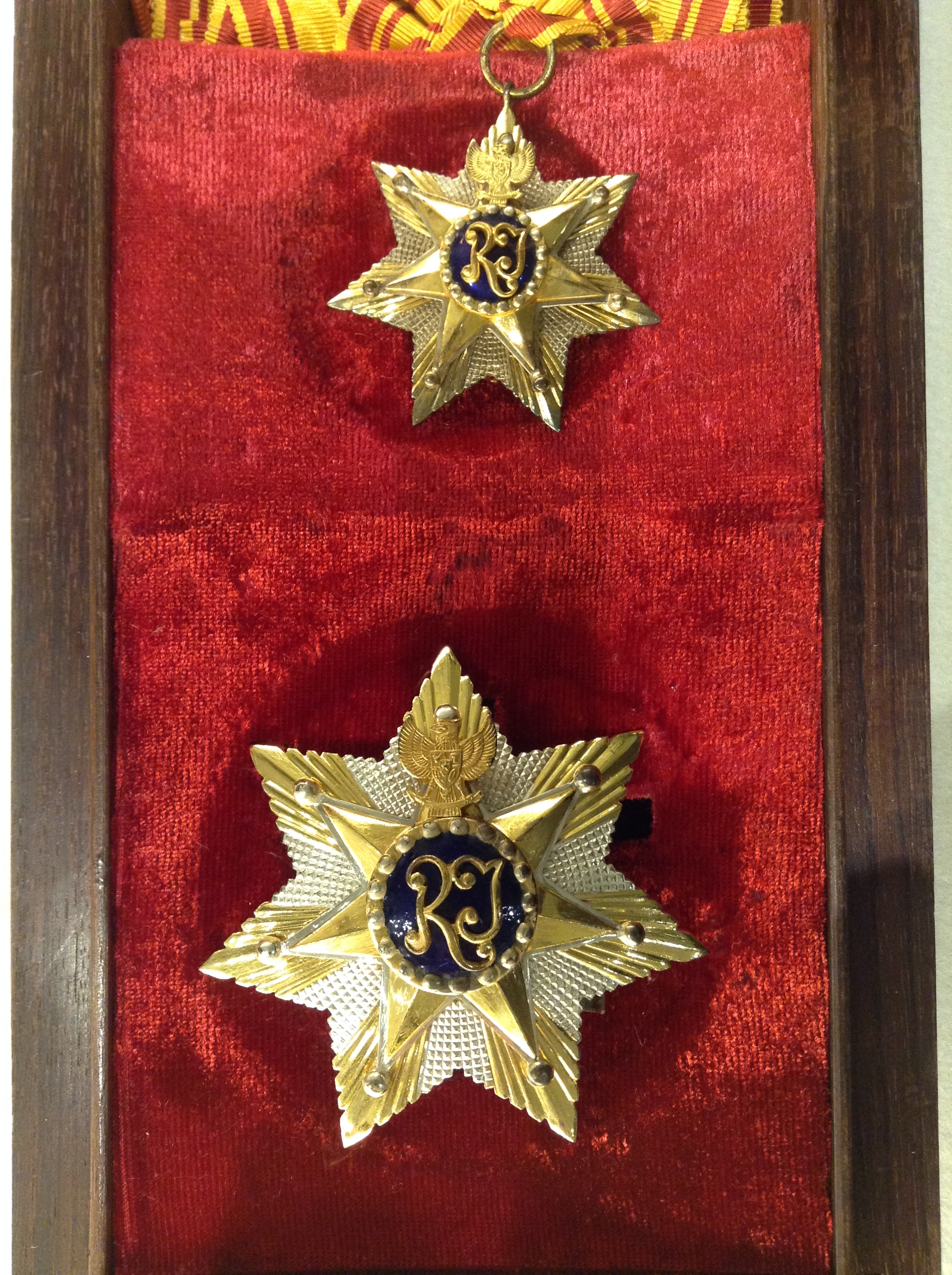

Awarded by the President of Indonesia
- Type: Order
- Established: 1959
- Country: Indonesia
- Status: Currently awarded
- Grand Master: President of Indonesia

Precedence
- Next (higher): None (highest)
- Next (lower): Star of Mahaputera
- Ribbon bar of Adipurna class Ribbon bar of Adipradana class Ribbon bar of Utama class Ribbon bar of Pratama class Ribbon bar of Nararya class

The Star of the Republic of Indonesia (Indonesian: Bintang Republik Indonesia) is Indonesia's highest order awarded to both civilians and the military for their merits to the republic and the people. It was officially instituted in 1959.

It is awarded to a person who has given extraordinary service to the integrity, viability, and greatness of Indonesia. As the highest order of the Republic, its grand master is the President of the Republic of Indonesia, who after their inauguration is bestowed upon with the collar and medal of the "Bintang Republik Indonesia Adipurna" class. The Vice President of the Republic of Indonesia, after their inauguration, is also bestowed upon with the collar and medal of the "Bintang Republik Indonesia Adipradana" class.

== Classes ==
The order is awarded in five classes.

| Adipurna (1st class) | Adipradana (2nd class) | Utama (3rd class) | Pratama (4th class) | Nararya (5th class) |

Recipients of the Star of the Republic of Indonesia wear the star on a sash and a breast star on the left chest.

Prior to 1972, only Bintang Republik Indonesia Adipurna recipients wore the star on a sash. Recipients of the Bintang Republik Indonesia Adipradana wore the star on a ribbon which was worn around the neck. Both of Adipurna and Adipradana classes wore a breast star on the left chest. Recipients of the Bintang Republik Indonesia Utama, Pratama, and Nararya wore the star on a ribbon on the left chest; with rosette for the Pratama class.

Ribbon bar of the Star of the Republic of Indonesia
| 1972–now | | | | | |
| 1959–1972 | | | | | |
| Class | Adipurna | Adipradana | Utama | Pratama | Nararya |

== Recipients of the 1st Class ==
| Portrait | Name | Title | Legal Basis | Year | Ref. |
|---|---|---|---|---|---|
| | Sukarno | President of Indonesia | Article 3, UU Darurat (Ordinance-as-Act) No. 5/1959 | 1959 | |
| | Fidel Castro | President of Cuba | | 22 January 1960 | |
| | Muhammad Ayub Khan | President of Pakistan | | December 1960 | |
| | Bhumibol Adulyadej | King of Thailand | | 1961 | |
| | Antonín Novotný | President of Czechoslovakia | | 28 May 1961 | |
| | Leonid Brezhnev | Chairman of the Presidium of the Supreme Soviet | | 10 June 1961 | |
| | Liu Shaoqi | Chairman of the People's Republic of China | | 14 June 1961 | |
| | Josip Broz Tito | President of Yugoslavia | | 16 June 1961 | |
| | Akihito | Crown Prince of Japan | | 31 January 1962 | |
| | Gheorghe Gheorghiu-Dej | President of the State Council of the Romanian People's Republic | | 2 October 1962 | |
| | Kim Il Sung | Premier of North Korea | | 1965 | |
| | Oerip Soemohardjo | Commander of the Indonesian National Armed Forces | Presidential Decree No. 18/K/1967 | 10 November 1967 | |
| | Sudirman | Commander of the Indonesian National Armed Forces | Presidential Decree No. 18/K/1967 | 10 November 1967 | |
| | Ferdinand Marcos | President of the Philippines | | 1968 | |
| | Mohammad Hatta | Vice President of Indonesia | Presidential Decree No. 35/TK/1972 | 11 August 1972 | |
| | Elizabeth II | Queen of the United Kingdom | | 1974 | |
| | Hamad bin Isa Al Khalifa | King of Bahrain | | 8 October 1977 | |
| | Hassanal Bolkiah | Yang Di-Pertuan Brunei Darussalam | | 22 October 1984 | |
| | Iskandar | Yang di-Pertuan Agong of Malaysia | | 5 February 1987 | |
| | Mahathir Mohamad | Prime Minister of Malaysia | | 6 February 1987 | |
| | Suharto | President of Indonesia | Presidential Decree No. 29/TK/1988 | 27 May 1988 | |
| | Nelson Mandela | President of South Africa | | 19 October 1990 | |
| | Jawaharlal Nehru | Prime Minister of India | Presidential Decree No. 75/TK/1995 | 12 December 1995 | |
| | Bacharuddin Jusuf Habibie | President of Indonesia | Presidential Decree No. 40/TK/1998 | 27 May 1998 | |
| | Abdurrahman Wahid | President of Indonesia | Presidential Decree No. 16/TK/2001 | 23 February 2001 | |
| | Megawati Sukarnoputri | President of Indonesia | Presidential Decree No. 66/TK/2001 | 8 August 2001 | |
| | Susilo Bambang Yudhoyono | President of Indonesia | Presidential Decree No. 83/TK/2004 | 27 October 2004 | |
| | Abdullah bin Abdulaziz al-Saud | King of Saudi Arabia | | 26 April 2006 | |
| | Mizan Zainal Abidin | Yang di-Pertuan Agong of Malaysia | Presidential Decree No. 80/TK/2011 | 2011 | |
| | Lee Myung-bak | President of South Korea | | 2012 | |
| | Benigno Aquino III | President of the Philippines | Presidential Decree No. 72/TK/2014 | 10 October 2014 | |
| | Xanana Gusmão | President of East Timor | | 10 October 2014 | |
| | Joko Widodo | President of Indonesia | Presidential Decree No. 112/TK/2014 | 19 October 2014 | |
| | Salman bin Abdulaziz al-Saud | King of Saudi Arabia | Presidential Decree No. 22/TK/2017 | 22 February 2017 | |
| | Carl XVI Gustaf | King of Sweden | Presidential Decree No. 51/TK/2017 | 19 May 2017 | |
| | Prabowo Subianto | President of Indonesia | | 20 October 2024 | |
| | Narendra Modi | Prime Minister of India | | 7 July 2026 | |

== Recipients of the 2nd Class ==
| No | Name | Title | Legal Basis |
|---|---|---|---|
| 1 | Djuanda Kartawidjaja | Prime Minister of Indonesia | dated 1961 |
| 2 | Soedirman | Commander of the Indonesian National Armed Forces | dated 1961 |
| 3 | Zhou Enlai | Premier of the People's Republic of China | 14 June 1961 |
| 4 | Zhu De | Chairman of the Standing Committee of the National People's Congress | 14 June 1961 |
| 5 | Ahmad Yani | Commander of the Indonesian Army | Keppres No.050/BTK/1965; dated 10-11-1965 |
| 6 | Donald Isaac Pandjaitan | Indonesian Major General | Keppres No.050/BTK/1965; dated 10-11-1965 |
| 7 | Karel Satsuit Tubun | Indonesian Police Officer | Keppres No.050/BTK/TH 1965; dated 10-11-1965 |
| 8 | Katamso Darmokusumo | Commander of the 072 Military Resort Command/Pamungkas | Keppres No.050/BTK/1965; dated 10-11-1965 |
| 9 | Mas Tirtodarmo Harjono | Indonesian Lieutenant General | Keppres No.050/BTK/TH 1965; dated 10-11-1965 |
| 10 | Siswondo Parman | Indonesian Lieutenant General | Keppres No.050/BTK/1965; dated 10- 11-1965 |
| 11 | Sugiyono Mangunwiyoto | Commander of the 072 Military Resort Command/Pamungkas | Keppres No.050/BTK/1965; dated 10-11-1965 |
| 12 | Soeprapto | Indonesian Lieutenant General | Keppres No.050/BTK/1965; dated 10-11-1965 |
| 13 | Sutoyo Siswomiharjo | Indonesian Major General | Keppres No.050/BTK/1965; dated 10-11-1965 |
| 14 | Pierre Andries Tendean | Indonesian Captain | Keppres No.050/BTK/1965; dated 10-11-1965 |
| 15 | Hamengkubuwana IX | Coordinating Minister for Economic Affairs of Indonesia | Keppres No.4/BTK/TH 1967; dated 20-5-1967 |
| 16 | Adam Malik Batubara | Minister of Foreign Affairs | Keppres No.012/TK/TH 1973; dated 10-3-1973 |
| 17 | Idham Chalid | Speaker of the People's Representative Council | Keppres No.012/TK/TH 1973; dated 10-3-1973 |
| 18 | Maraden Panggabean | Coordinating Minister for Political and Security Affairs of Indonesia | Keppres No.012/TK/TH 1973; dated 10-3-1973 |
| 19 | Siti Hartinah Suharto | First Lady of Indonesia | Keppres No.012/TK/TH 1973; dated 10-3-1973 |
| 20 | Widjojo Nitisastro | Coordinating Minister for Economic Affairs of Indonesia | Keppres No.012/TK/TH 1973; dated 10-3-1973 |
| 21 | Wilopo | Chairman of the Supreme Advisory Council | Keppres No.012/TK/TH 1973; dated 10-3-1973 |
| 22 | Umar Wirahadikusumah | Vice President of Indonesia | Keppres No.009/TK/1983; dated 12-3-1983 |
| 23 | Sudharmono | Vice President of Indonesia | Keppres No.010/TK/1988; dated 29-3-1988 |
| 24 | Try Sutrisno | Vice President of Indonesia | Keppres No.018/TK/1993; dated 17-3-1993 |
| 25 | Amirmachmud | Chairman of the People's Consultative Assembly | Keppres No.072/TK/ 1995; dated 7-8-1995 |
| 26 | Andi Mohammad Jusuf Amir | Minister of Defence of Indonesia | Keppres No.072/TK/ 1995; dated 7-8-1995 |
| 27 | Basuki Rahmat | Minister of Home Affairs of Indonesia | Keppres No.072/TK/ 1995; dated 7-8-1995 |
| 28 | Abdul Haris Nasution | Chairman of the People's Consultative Assembly | Keppres No.110/TK/1997; dated 26-9-1997 |
| 29 | Bacharuddin Jusuf Habibie | Vice President of Indonesia | Keppres No.022/TK/1998; dated 12-3-1998 |
| 30 | Hasri Ainun Habibie | First Lady of Indonesia | Keppres No.071/TK/1998; dated 6-8-1998 |
| 31 | Burhanuddin Harahap | Prime Minister of Indonesia | Keppres No.110/TK/1998; dated 6-11-1998 |
| 32 | Mohammad Natsir | Prime Minister of Indonesia | Keppres No.110/TK/1998; dated 6-11-1998 |
| 33 | Sartono | Chairman of the People's Representative Council | Keppres No.110/TK/1998; dated 6-11-1998 |
| 34 | Syafruddin Prawiranegara | Head of Republic of Indonesia Emergency Government | Keppres No.110/TK/1998; dated 6-11-1998 |
| 35 | Sutan Syahrir | Prime Minister of Indonesia | Keppres No.029/TK/TH 1988; dated 27-5-1988 |
| 36 | Fatmawati Sukarno | First Lady of Indonesia | Keppres No.075/TK/1999; dated 13-08-1999 |
| 37 | Siti Rahmiati Hatta | Second Lady of Indonesia | Keppres No.075/TK/1999; dated 13-08-1999 |
| 38 | Megawati Sukarnoputri | Vice President of Indonesia | Keppres No.017/TK/2001; dated 23-02-2001 |
| 39 | Hamzah Haz | Vice President of Indonesia | Keppres No.067/TK/2001; dated 08-08-2001 |
| 40 | Jusuf Kalla | Vice President of Indonesia | Keppres No.084/TK/2004; dated 27-10-2004 |
| 41 | Boediono | Vice President of Indonesia | dated October 2009 |
| 42 | Ani Yudhoyono | First Lady of Indonesia | dated 12-8-2011 |
| 43 | Sinta Nuriyah Wahid | First Lady of Indonesia | dated 12-8-2011 |
| 44 | Ma'ruf Amin | Vice President of Indonesia | dated October 2019 |
| 45 | Iriana | First Lady of Indonesia | Keppres No.066/TK/2023; dated 07-08-2023 |
| 46 | Gibran Rakabuming Raka | Vice President of Indonesia | dated October 2024 |

== See also ==
- Orders, decorations, and medals of Indonesia
