= Ani Yudhoyono =

First Lady of Indonesia

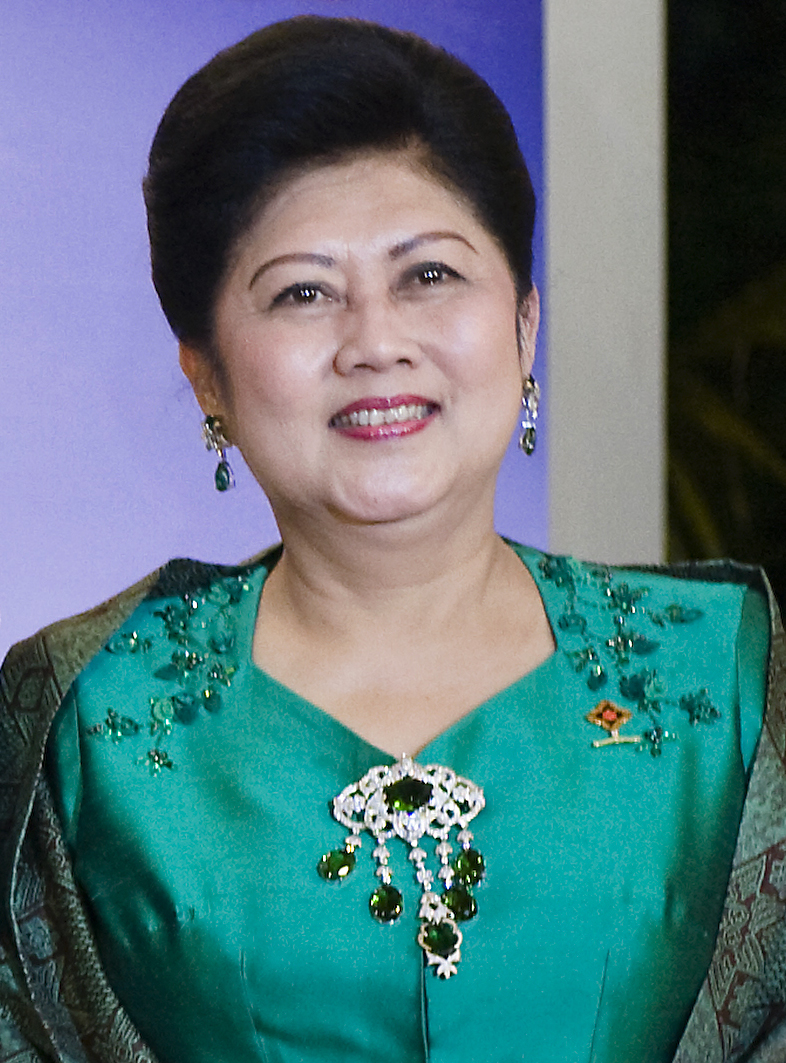
- Ani Yudhoyono in 2009

First Lady of Indonesia
- In role 20 October 2004 – 20 October 2014
- President: Susilo Bambang Yudhoyono
- Preceded by: Taufiq Kiemas (as First Gentleman)
- Succeeded by: Iriana

Personal details
- Born: Kristiani Herrawati; 6 July 1952 Yogyakarta, Indonesia
- Died: 1 June 2019 (aged 66) National University Hospital, Singapore
- Resting place: Kalibata Heroes' Cemetery
- Party: Demokrat
- Spouse: Susilo Bambang Yudhoyono (m. 1976)
- Children: Agus; Edhie
- Parents: Sarwo Edhie Wibowo (father); Sunarti Sri Hadiyah (mother)
- Relatives: Pramono Edhie Wibowo (brother)
- Education: Christian University of Indonesia (unfinished); Indonesia Open University
- Occupation: Political and female activist
- Awards: Star of the Republic of Indonesia Adipradana

Kristiani Herrawati better known as Ani Yudhoyono (6 July 1952 – 1 June 2019) was an Indonesian political and female activist, who was the wife of former Indonesian President Susilo Bambang Yudhoyono and First Lady of Indonesia from 2004 until 2014. She was also the daughter of Sarwo Edhie Wibowo.

== Family and education ==
Kristiani Herrawati was born on 6 July 1952 in Yogyakarta, to Lt. Gen. (ret.) Sarwo Edhie Wibowo and Sunarti Sri Hadiyah. She was the third child of seven siblings.

In 1973, she became a medical student at the Christian University of Indonesia, but in the third year, she followed her father who was appointed an ambassador to South Korea. She subsequently married Susilo Bambang Yudhoyono (SBY) in 1976. Ani later continued studying at Indonesia Open University and graduated with a bachelor's degree in political science in 1998.

== Career ==
Yudhoyono's political activities included her appointment as vice chairman of the Democratic Party. At the time of the creation of the party, in 2001, she claimed a leadership position. She campaigned for the successful election of her husband for President of the Republic of Indonesia in 2004. Before this, she was active in various women's social organizations during SBY's term as minister under Abdurrahman Wahid and Megawati Sukarnoputri.

Following her husband's election to the presidency, she organised polio immunisation campaigns and mobil pintar (smart cars), where vans were filled with books for children to read. In 2013, it surfaced that Australian intelligence had been tapping her mobile phone as part of a row between Indonesia and Australia. Also in December of that year, she was mentioned in a leaked diplomatic cable, which accused her of actively influencing her husband on political affairs.

In 2007, a rare Papuan butterfly species was named after her. She was presented with a specimen of the butterfly Delias kristianiae which she donated to a museum.

== Personal life ==
Yudhoyono was a gardening enthusiast with a particular fondness for orchids, and as part of a diplomatic tradition, an orchid variety in Singapore is named after her. On her 61st birthday, she launched two books on the botanic collection at the Cipanas Palace and multiple Indonesian Botanical Gardens, in which some of her photographs were included.

Yudhoyono was an avid photographer. Most of her photography works were posted on her Instagram account, which has attracted more than 6.4 million followers at the time of her death in June 2019.

== Death ==
Yudhoyono died of leukemia on the morning of 1 June 2019, after undergoing treatment for nearly four months at the National University Hospital, Singapore at the age of 66.

Her remains were flown from Paya Lebar Air Base, Singapore to Halim Perdanakusuma International Airport, East Jakarta on the same evening. Funeral prayers were held at her private home in Cikeas, West Java, the following day, before burial at the Kalibata Heroes' Cemetery in South Jakarta that afternoon.

Honorary titles
| Preceded by Taufiq Kiemas as First Gentleman | First Lady of Indonesia; 20 October 2004 – 20 October 2014 | Succeeded by Iriana |
