= Iriana =

First Lady of Indonesia from 2014 to 2024

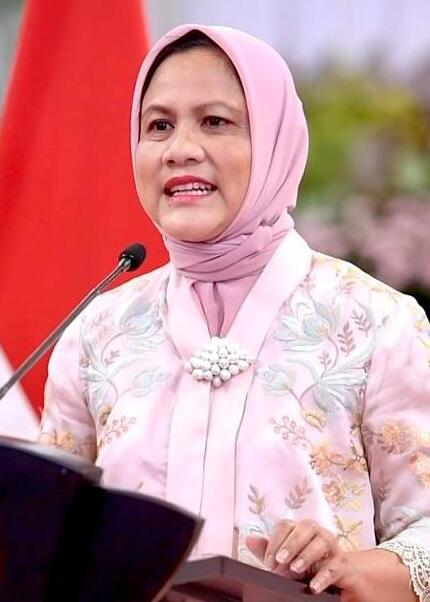
- Iriana in 2021

First Lady of Indonesia
- In role 20 October 2014 – 20 October 2024
- President: Joko Widodo
- Preceded by: Ani Yudhoyono
- Succeeded by: Vacant

Head of TP-PKK of Jakarta
- In office 15 October 2012 – 4 December 2014
- President: Susilo Bambang Yudhoyono; Joko Widodo
- Governor: Joko Widodo; Basuki Tjahaja Purnama
- Preceded by: Sri Hartati
- Succeeded by: Veronica Tan

First Lady of Jakarta
- In office 15 October 2012 – 16 October 2014
- President: Susilo Bambang Yudhoyono
- Governor: Joko Widodo
- Preceded by: Sri Hartati
- Succeeded by: Veronica Tan

Personal details
- Born: 1 October 1963 (age 63) Surakarta, Indonesia
- Spouse: Joko Widodo (m. 1986)
- Children: Gibran; Kahiyang; Kaesang
- Parents: Ngadijo (father); Sri Soenarni (mother)
- Relatives: Family of Joko Widodo (by marriage)
- Education: Muhammadiyah University of Surakarta (unfinished)
- Awards: Star of the Republic of Indonesia Adipradana

Iriana (born 1 October 1963), is the former First Lady of Indonesia from 2014 to 2024. She is the wife of the former president, Joko Widodo and mother of the former vice president, Gibran Rakabuming Raka.

== Early career ==
Iriana graduated from State High School No. 3, Solo in 1983. She then studied at Muhammadiyah University of Surakarta for six semesters, but left without a degree to marry Joko Widodo.

While her husband served as governor of Jakarta, Iriana was appointed as leader of the Family Welfare Education organisation (Pembinaan Kesejahteraan Keluarga or PKK), a national women's movement in Indonesia. She also served as leader of the PKK in Surakarta from 2005 to 2012 when her husband was mayor of Surakarta.

== Family ==
Iriana married Joko Widodo in Solo, Central Java, on 22 December 1986. They have two sons: Gibran Rakabuming (born 1 October 1987) and Kaesang Pangarep (born 25 December 1994) and one daughter named Kahiyang Ayu (born 20 April 1991).

Honorary titles
Preceded by Ani Yudhoyono	First Lady of Indonesia; 20 October 2014 – 20 October 2024	Vacant Prabowo Subianto is currently separated from his wife.
