= Lhoksukon =

Coordinates: 5°03′N 97°19′E

Lhoksukon ([lʰok̚.su.kon]) is a town in Aceh province of Indonesia and it is the seat (administrative capital) of North Aceh Regency. The town covers a land area of 243 km^{2}, and had a population of 44,358 at the 2010 Census and 49,733 at the 2020 Census; the estimated population as at mid 2023 was 51,421. The postcode is 24382.

From 1999 to 2003, Indonesian soldiers were contracted by ExxonMobil to guard an oil and gas plant in the town. In 2001, 11 people from the provinceof Aceh sued ExxonMobil in the United States District Court for the District of Columbia, alleging that the soldiers had sexual assaulted, raped, beaten, tortured, and illegally detained the townspeople. The lawsuit, Doe v. Exxon Mobil Corp, was settled in 2023.

== Notable people ==
- Azriana Manalu, women's rights activist

== Climate ==
Lhoksukon has a tropical rainforest climate (Af) with moderate to heavy rainfall year-round.

Climate data for Lhoksukon
Month	Jan	Feb	Mar	Apr	May	Jun	Jul	Aug	Sep	Oct	Nov	Dec	Year
Mean daily maximum °C (°F)	30.6 (87.1)	31.8 (89.2)	32.4 (90.3)	32.6 (90.7)	32.1 (89.8)	32.0 (89.6)	31.7 (89.1)	31.8 (89.2)	31.1 (88.0)	31.1 (88.0)	30.5 (86.9)	30.4 (86.7)	31.5 (88.7)
Daily mean °C (°F)	26.6 (79.9)	27.2 (81.0)	27.6 (81.7)	28.0 (82.4)	27.8 (82.0)	27.6 (81.7)	27.3 (81.1)	27.4 (81.3)	27.1 (80.8)	27.2 (81.0)	26.8 (80.2)	26.7 (80.1)	27.3 (81.1)
Mean daily minimum °C (°F)	22.7 (72.9)	22.6 (72.7)	22.8 (73.0)	23.5 (74.3)	23.5 (74.3)	23.3 (73.9)	22.9 (73.2)	23.0 (73.4)	23.1 (73.6)	23.4 (74.1)	23.1 (73.6)	23.0 (73.4)	23.1 (73.5)
Average rainfall mm (inches)	143 (5.6)	69 (2.7)	73 (2.9)	100 (3.9)	150 (5.9)	104 (4.1)	104 (4.1)	158 (6.2)	176 (6.9)	201 (7.9)	194 (7.6)	227 (8.9)	1,699 (66.7)
Source: Climate-Data.org
