= Azriana Manalu =

Indonesian women's rights activist

- Education: Syiah Kuala University
- Occupation: Lawyer
- Employer: LBH APIK Aceh
- Organization: National Commission on Violence against Women (Indonesia) (Commissioner)

Azriana Manalu is an Indonesian Acehnese women's rights activist and lawyer, who was Chair of the National Commission on Violence against Women (commonly known in the Indonesian language as Komnas Perempuan).

== Early life and education ==
Manalu was born in Lhoksukon, North Aceh, on 7 March 1968. She graduated with a degree in Law from Syiah Kuala University, Banda Aceh, in 1993.

== Career ==
Manalu has worked as a lawyer since she was 27 and works to aid victims of violence against women. In 1995 she joined LBH Iskandar Muda Lhoksumawe as a lawyer. From 2000 she worked for LBH APIK Aceh, later joining their Board of Management. She has worked as commissioner of Komnas Perempuan since 2009 and was elected as Chair in 2015, a role she held until 2019.
