= Siti Hardiyanti Rukmana =

Indonesian businesswoman and politician

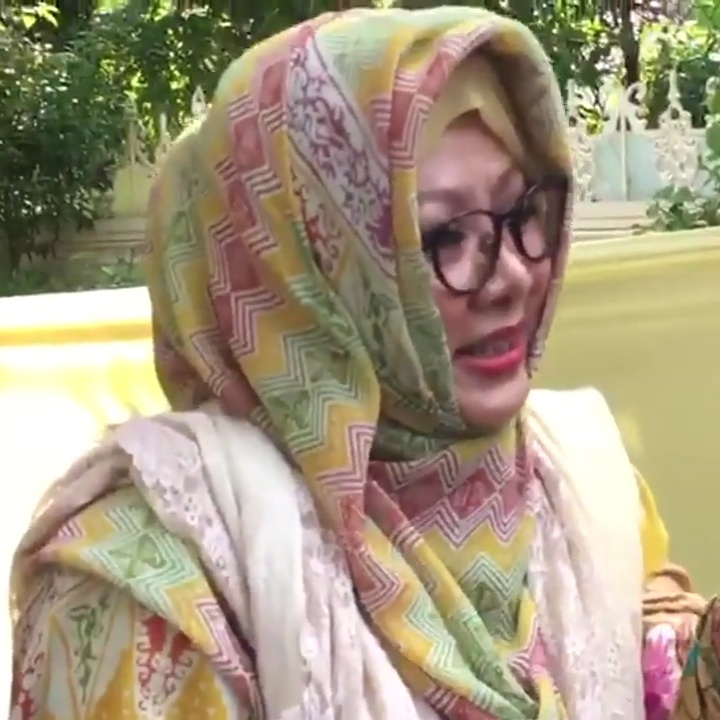
- Tutut Suharto in 2019

24th Minister of Social Affairs
- In office 14 March 1998 – 21 May 1998
- President: Suharto
- Preceded by: Endang Kusuma Inten Soeweno
- Succeeded by: Justika Baharsjah

First Lady of Indonesia
- Acting
- In role 28 April 1996 – 21 May 1998
- President: Suharto
- Preceded by: Siti Hartinah
- Succeeded by: Hasri Ainun Habibie

Personal details
- Born: Siti Hardiyanti Hastuti; 23 January 1949 (age 77) Yogyakarta, Indonesia
- Party: Berkarya
- Other political affiliations: Golkar (until 1998); PKPB (2002–2014)
- Spouse: Indra Rukmana (m. 1972)
- Parents: Suharto (father); Siti Hartinah (mother)
- Relatives: Sigit Suharto (brother); Bambang Suharto (brother); Titiek Suharto (sister); Tommy Suharto (brother); Mamiek Suharto (sister)
- Education: Trisakti University
- Occupation: Businessperson; politician
- Nickname: Mbak Tutut

Siti Hardiyanti Rukmana (née Hastuti; born 23 January 1949), popularly known as Tutut Suharto, is an Indonesian businesswoman and politician. She is the first child (and eldest daughter) of Suharto, the second president of Indonesia. She is a former Minister of Social Affairs and a former member of the People's Consultative Assembly, representing Golkar from 1992 to 1998.

== Early life ==
Tutut Suharto was born in Yogyakarta in 1949. She is the first child of Suharto and Siti Hartinah. At that time, her father was Commander of the Mataram Brigade (Wehrkreise III) in Yogyakarta with the rank of Lieutenant colonel. Tutut is also a descendant of Mangkunegara III from her mother’s side.

The name Tutut comes from her childhood nickname. At first, she was often called Tuti (short for Hastuti), but sometimes she did not respond when called. Her father humoured her with the sound of a train: Tut tut tut, which successfully grabbed her attention and made her laugh. Gradually this nickname stuck, becoming Tutut.

It was characteristic of a military family’s life that three of Suharto's children, including Tutut, were born when he was on duty and away from his family. Tutut was born when Suharto was fighting in a guerrilla war outside of Yogyakarta. Her father did not see his first daughter for three months after her birth.

When her father was first inaugurated as president, Tutut's parents decided not to make Merdeka Palace their private residence. They moved instead from Jalan Haji Agus Salim (the street where they first lived in Jakarta) to Jalan Cendana in the suburb of Menteng. One of the main reasons for the move was security. There was a high-rise building behind the house in Haji Agus Salim. Merdeka Palace had not been Suharto’s choice because he wanted his children to have freedom. At that time, Tutut was 18 years old.

== Career ==
=== Philanthropy & social activism ===
In 1986, she led the donations effort to flood victims in Padang Pariaman and Pasaman, West Sumatra. In 1988, she was elected chairperson of the Indonesian Association of Social Workers (Himpunan Pekerja Sosial Indonesia) for a 5 year term, and has been involved with the organization since its inception.

In 1994, she was elected chairman of the Indonesian Red Cross Society. She served as chairman from 1994 to 1999.

She is recently active in social activities under the Dharmais Foundation (Yayasan Dharmais). In 2019, the foundation organized a mass cataract operation for people living in underprivileged communities. Since its inception in 1976, the foundation has created a positive impact for 140,000 people.

=== Business career ===
Tutut started her business career supplying computer paper, with two of her high school friends, to the Center for Science and Technology Research (Puspiptek). When Puspiptek needed their buildings painted or landscaping done, her company also performed those services, with Tutut acting as the foreman. Other early businesses also included manufacturing business attire and supplying aircraft spare parts.

In the 1980s, Tutut established several agribusinesses, including Citra Sekarwangi Agro Persada, which produced raw cashew nuts and cashew oil, and Citra Indokasava, which marketed cassava flour. By the mid-1980s, Tutut founded several other companies that encompassed areas such as industrial maintenance, natural hair care products, and specialized foundation systems.

The company most commonly associated with Tutut is the Citra Lamtoro Gung Persada group. Under this company, Tutut led the construction of the first elevated toll road in Indonesia. The Cawang-Tanjung Priok project was the first toll road project offered to the private sector, and the consortium led by Tutut won the tender process; beating out large contractors from West Germany, Japan, South Korea, and Taiwan in a process monitored by an international committee. Tutut, who was only 37 years old at the time, admitted that when she won the project, many parties "doubted my capabilities". Due to the nascent nature of the project and construction method (from the sosrobahu technique), Tutut had to secure a bridge loan from an international bank to fund the initial stages when domestic banks took more time than expected to perform their due diligence. The first piling was carried out in 1987, and by March 1990, under Tutut's leadership, the Cawang-Tanjung Priok Toll Road was completed eight months ahead of schedule.

Due to the success of the toll road project in Indonesia, in 1990, Tutut was awarded the construction of the first toll road in Malaysia, between Ayer Hitam and Yong Peng East stretching 38 km. Tutut's companies also won bids for the construction of an oil refinery in Kedah, Malaysia, and a contract to import Malaysia's national car, the Proton Saga.

In 1991 she was elected Chairman of the Advisory Board of HISPI (Himpunan Santri Pengusaha Indonesia/Indonesian Santri Entrepreneurs Association), an association for muslim entrepreneurs.

In 1992, Tutut’s company helped to construct and sponsor the Indonesia pavilion at the Floriade in Zoetermeer, Netherlands. In the same year, she founded PT Siratama Agraraya (Star), a company engaged in exports to the Middle East and later on diversified into construction services and investments.

=== Political career ===
Tutut served as deputy chairperson of Golkar from 1993–98. Following the death of her mother in 1996, she acted in the capacity of first lady of Indonesia in official ceremonies. In addition, Suharto appointed her as Social Affairs Minister in March 1998 in his final cabinet. During her time as Minister, she implemented a short-term free meal program where the government provided free meals to people who were laid off or experiencing food hardship.

In addition, the Ministry of Social Affairs also developed a savings program (Takesra) and Business Credit program (Kukesra) for people who were recently unemployed.

Following her father's resignation as president in May 1998, Golkar in July announced it had recalled Tutut, her brothers Bambang Trihatmodjo and Hutomo 'Tommy' Mandala Putra and Bambang's wife Halimah from the People's Consultative Assembly (MPR).

Golkar officials in 2008 said they would not object to Suharto's children, especially Tutut, rejoining the party's board. In addition, Golkar Deputy Secretary General Rully Chairul Anwar also noted that as of 2008 Tutut, Bambang Trihatmodjo and Titiek Suharto were still listed as Golkar members albeit as non-active members.

Tutut planned to run for the presidency in the 2004 presidential election on the ticket of the Concern for the Nation Functional Party (PKPB). However, since the party won only 2.1% of the popular vote in the 2004 general election (giving it just two seats in the House of Representatives), she was ineligible to run. At that time, political parties needed to receive at least 5% of the popular vote or 3% of seats in the DPR to field a presidential candidate. The election was ultimately won by former General Susilo Bambang Yudhoyono, defeating incumbent President Megawati Sukarnoputri. In Indonesia's 2009 general election, PKPB won 1.4% of the popular vote, losing its two seats in the House of Representatives. In 2014, the party failed to qualify for the 2014 general election.

In 2025, Tutut represented the Suharto family when her father was given the honorary National Hero title by the Indonesian government at a ceremony in Istana Negara. In addition, Tutut accepted a Special Award that was bestowed to her mother at the 2025 Kartini Awards.

=== Other activities ===
Tutut is known to be fond of writing songs and poems, which she has started doing since 1983. Some of her compositions uses the pseudonym "Diyanti R" (which is a shortened version of her name). This hobby was also strongly encouraged by her mother, Mrs Tien Suharto. As of 2018, she has composed over 120 songs and poems.

== Personal life ==
In 1972, Tutut married Indra Rukmana, son of businessman Edi Kowara Adiwinata. The wedding was held in Bogor Palace. The couple have 4 children together.

== Honours ==
- Star of Mahaputera, 4th Class (Indonesian: Bintang Mahaputera Pratama) (11 August 1997)

Political offices
Preceded by Endang Kusuma; Inten Soeweno	Minister of Social Affairs; 1998	Succeeded by Justika Baharsjah
Honorary titles
Preceded by Siti Hartinah	First Lady of Indonesia (acting); 28 April 1996 – 21 May 1998	Succeeded by Hasri Ainun Habibie
