= Hasri Ainun Habibie =

Indonesian physician and wife of former President B. J. Habibie

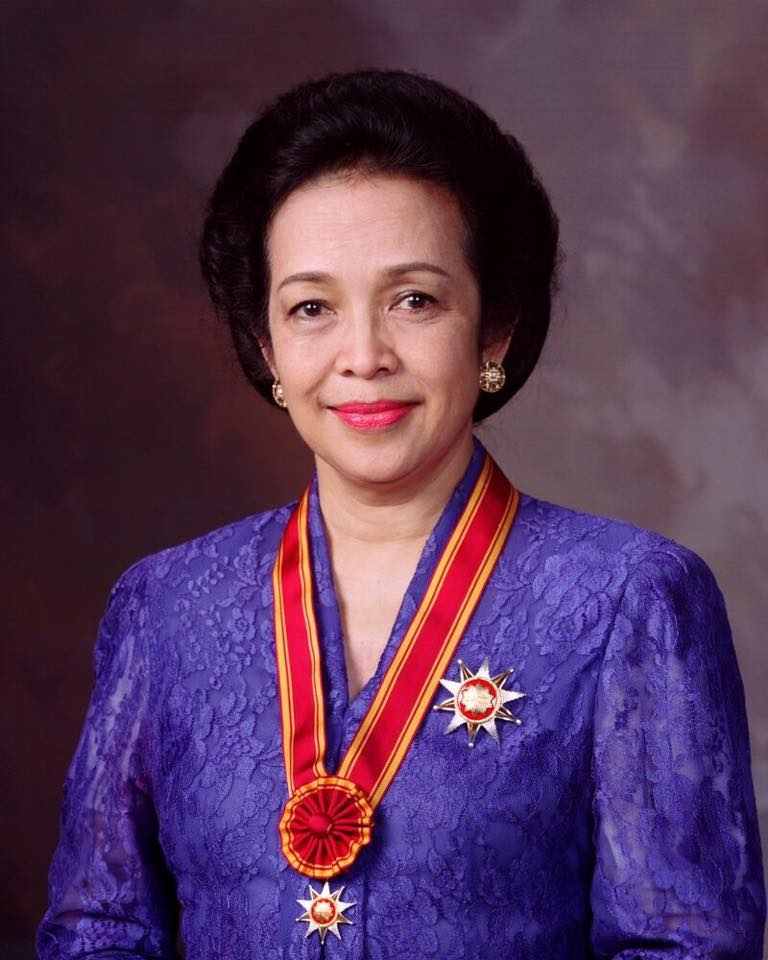
- Official portrait, 1998

First Lady of Indonesia
- In role 21 May 1998 – 20 October 1999
- President: B. J. Habibie
- Preceded by: Siti Hartinah; Siti Hardiyanti Rukmana (acting)
- Succeeded by: Sinta Nuriyah

Second Lady of Indonesia
- In role 11 March 1998 – 21 May 1998
- Vice President: B. J. Habibie
- Preceded by: Tuti Sutrisno
- Succeeded by: Taufiq Kiemas (as Second Gentleman)

Personal details
- Born: Hasri Ainun Besari; 11 August 1937 Semarang, Dutch East Indies
- Died: 22 May 2010 (aged 72) Munich, Germany
- Resting place: Kalibata Heroes' Cemetery
- Spouse: B. J. Habibie (m. 1962)
- Children: Ilham; Thareq
- Parents: Mohamad Besari (father); Sadarmi Besari (mother)
- Education: University of Indonesia
- Occupation: Physician

Hasri Ainun Habibie (née Besari; 11 August 1937 – 22 May 2010) was an Indonesian physician and wife of former President B. J. Habibie. She served as First Lady of Indonesia from 1998 to 1999.

== Early life ==
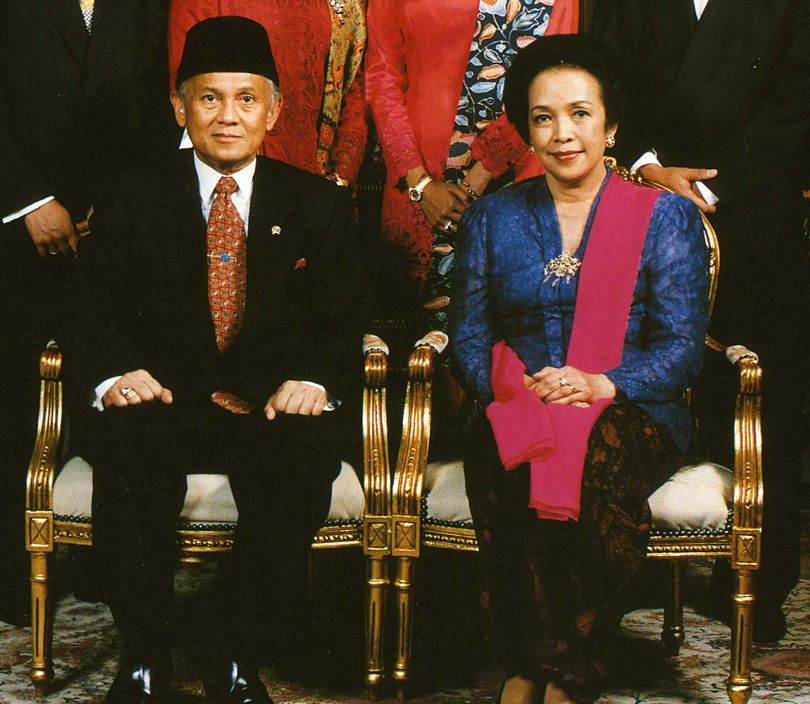
Habibie, the 3rd President of Indonesia, with his wife, Ainun

Ainun was born on 11 August 1937 in Semarang to R. Mohamad Besari, a lecturer, and his wife Sadarmi Besari, a midwife, whose family is known as well-educated and intellectual.

She and her siblings studied at Dago Christian Junior College. Her eldest brother, Sahari, graduated from junior college when he was in sophomore year and continued his education at Bandung Institute of Technology. Ainun continued her education in the Medical Faculty of University of Indonesia and graduated in 1961.

== Marriage ==
Ainun first met B. J. "Rudy" Habibie when they were studying in secondary school. They were schoolmates when studying in Dago Christian Junior College. Their families had known each other for a long time and often visited each other.

In 1962, Rudy and Ainun met again. They fell in love and wed on 12 May 1962. Their honeymoon took place in Yogyakarta, Bali, and Ujung Pandang. Rudy's three-month holiday in Indonesia soon ended and they moved to Aachen, where Rudy worked. The couple had two children.

== Career ==
In 1978, Suharto appointed the 42-year-old B. J. Habibie to be his Minister of Research and Technology in his third cabinet. As the wife of a member of the cabinet, Ainun joined the Dharma Wanita organization under the leadership of First Lady Siti Hartinah. Ainun led her husband's ministry's Dharma Wanita and consolidating non-department organization with Madame Soedharmono, wife of Soedharmono, Secretary of State.

On 26 April 1978, First Lady Tien Soeharto, Second Lady Nelly Adam Malik, and Mrs Soehartati Oemar Senoadji founded Yayasan Karya Bhakti RIA Pembangunan or simply as YKBRP, which Ainun chaired from 1998 until her death. Ainun was chairwoman of PPMTI from 2000 until her death in 2010.

== Second Lady of Indonesia (1998) ==
In 1996, First Lady Siti Hartinah died and her eldest daughter Tutut was appointed to replace her as acting First Lady.

Suharto appointed Habibie as his second-in-command in 1998, and the parliament elected them as president and vice-president. Ainun thus became Second Lady and leader of Dharma Wanita (held by a First Lady, but there was no First Lady at the time, because First Lady Siti Hartinah had died). She later became its official leader in May 1998.

== First lady (1998–1999) ==
Suharto was on a state visit to Cairo when demonstrators stormed the House of Representatives' office buildings. Suharto quickly returned to Indonesia and resigned his position as president, leaving the position to Habibie. Ainun thus became first lady. Ainun became chairperson of all organizations associated with the first lady, including Dharma Wanita and YKBRP. In 1999, the parliament declined to accept Habibie's presidential responsibility speech and elected Abdurrahman Wahid as the next president.

== Death ==
In January 2010, Ainun was admitted to LMU Munich, Germany for intensive care for her ovarian cancer. After several operations, she died on 22 May in the same year. Her body was sent back to Jakarta and buried in the Kalibata National Heroes' Cemetery on 25 May in a military funeral ceremony conducted by President Susilo Bambang Yudhoyono.

== Honours ==
- Star of the Republic of Indonesia, 2nd Class (Indonesian: Bintang Republik Indonesia Adipradana) (6 August 1998)
- Star of Mahaputera, 1st Class (Indonesian: Bintang Mahaputera Adipurna) (28 May 1998)
- Star of Mahaputera, 3rd Class (Indonesian: Bintang Mahaputera Utama) (12 August 1992)

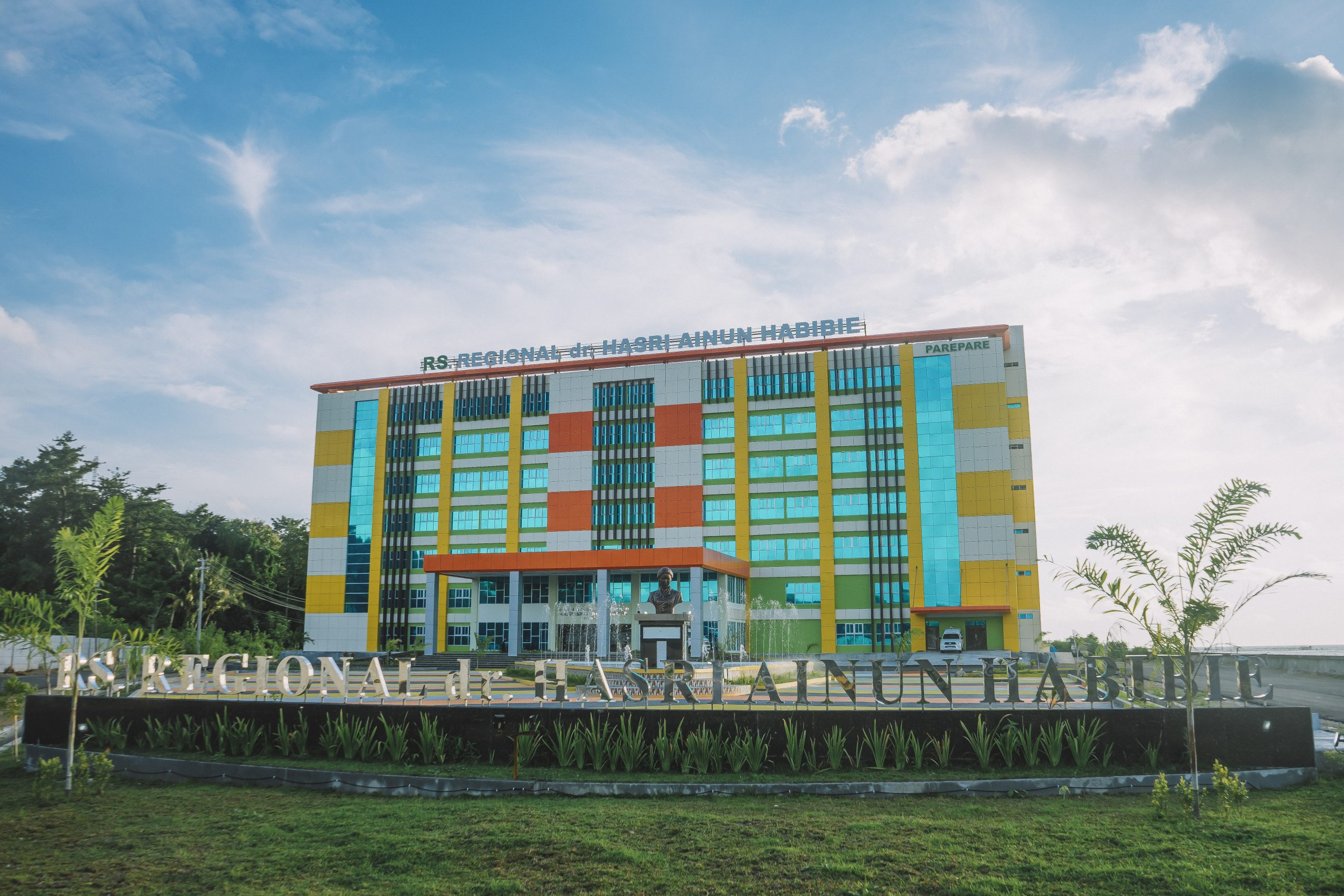
dr. Hasri Ainun Habibie Regional Hospital in Parepare

A monument called Monumen Cinta Sejati Habibie Ainun (Habibie Ainun True Love Monument) in B.J. Habibie's hometown of Parepare, South Sulawesi, featuring statue of B.J. Habibie and Hasri Ainun, was dedicated by B.J. Habibie at their 53rd wedding anniversary in 2015. A number of health facilities are named after her, such as dr. Hasri Ainun Habibie Regional Hospital in Parepare, dr. Hasri Ainun Habibie Regional General Hospital in Gorontalo city, Gorontalo, and dr. Hasri Ainun Habibie Eye Clinic in Bogor, West Java.

== In popular culture ==
Ainun was portrayed by actress Bunga Citra Lestari in the 2012 film Habibie & Ainun, based on the novel with the same title with the film by her husband, B. J. Habibie. It was published in 2010. The novel contains his 48 years married life with Ainun.

A traditional comedy opera series by Trans7 channel, Opera van Java, had their 2009 episode Hadidi dan Mainun where Ainun was portrayed by comedian Nunung.

In 2016, she made a cameo (portrayed by someone) in the 2016 film Rudy Habibie, a prequel to the 2012 film.

In the movie Habibie & Ainun 3 (2019), she was portrayed by Maudy Ayunda.

Honorary titles
Preceded by Siti Hartinah; Siti Hardiyanti Rukmana (acting)	First Lady of Indonesia; 21 May 1998 – 20 October 1999	Succeeded by Sinta Nuriyah
Preceded by Tuti Sutrisno	Second Lady of Indonesia; 11 March 1998 – 21 May 1998	Succeeded by Taufiq Kiemas as Second Gentleman
