= First ladies and gentlemen of Indonesia =

First Lady/Gentleman of Indonesia
- Ibu/Bapak Negara Indonesia
- Current; Vacant since 20 October 2024
- Style: Her Excellency (diplomatic); Madam (informal)
- Residence: Merdeka Palace (Note: Merdeka Palace is the official residence of the President of Indonesia along with 7 others which are; State Palace, Bogor Palace, Tampaksiring Palace, Gedung Agung and Cipanas Palace.)
- Seat: Jakarta
- Term length: 5 years
- Inaugural holder: Fatmawati (as first lady); Taufiq Kiemas (as first gentleman)
- Formation: 18 August 1945
- Website: presidenri.go.id

Throughout Indonesian history, the title of First Lady (Indonesian: Ibu Negara, lit. 'Mother of the State') or, in an instance, First Gentleman (Indonesian: Bapak Negara, lit. 'Father of the State') has been used to refer to the wife or husband of the president of Indonesia. The constitution does not provide for the position in any sense, but it continues to influence Indonesian society significantly, usually in social affairs.

Taufiq Kiemas, husband of President Megawati Sukarnoputri, remains the only first gentleman to date.

The current President of Indonesia, Prabowo Subianto, is separated from his wife, Titiek Suharto. Thus, the First Lady's seat is vacant for his presidency. In Prabowo's presidency, most of the functions of the First Lady on social affairs are assumed by the current Second Lady, Selvi Ananda.

== History ==
It is unclear when the role of Ibu Negara first developed in the Indonesian political convention. Sukarno, the first president, was married to his third wife, Fatmawati, when he became president in August 1945. Sukarno then married Hartini in July 1953 with Fatmawati's permission. Hartini lived in Istana Bogor and accompanied the president to official state duties and visits abroad. During his presidency, Sukarno married another five women, but Fatmawati remained the first lady for the remainder of Sukarno's presidency.

Siti Hartinah, Suharto's wife, occupied the role of Ibu Negara until her death in April 1996. Their eldest daughter, Siti Hardiyanti Rukmana (Tutut), adopted her mother's responsibilities throughout her father's presidency until 1998. From March to May 1998, she also served as minister of social affairs.

Prabowo Subianto, who was elected president in 2024, is the first Indonesian president to begin their tenure without a first spouse. He married Suharto's daughter, Siti Hediati Hariyadi (Titiek), in 1983, but they separated shortly after Suharto fell from power in 1998. However, Titiek was active in Prabowo's 2014, 2019, and 2024 presidential campaigns.

== List ==
President No.	Portrait	Name	Tenure	Age at tenure start	President (Spouse, unless noted)
1		Fatmawati; 5 February 1923 – 14 May 1980 (aged 57)	18 August 1945 – 12 March 1967	22 years, 194 days	Sukarno m. 1 June 1943
2		Siti Hartinah; 23 August 1923 – 28 April 1996 (aged 72)	12 March 1967 – 28 April 1996 †	43 years, 201 days	Suharto m. 26 December 1947
3		Hasri Ainun Besari; 11 August 1937 – 22 May 2010 (aged 72)	21 May 1998 – 20 October 1999	60 years, 283 days	Habibie m. 12 May 1962
4		Sinta Nuriyah; Born 8 March 1948 (age 78)	20 October 1999 – 23 July 2001	51 years, 226 days	Wahid m. 11 July 1968
5		Taufiq Kiemas; 31 December 1942 – 8 June 2013 (aged 70)	23 July 2001 – 20 October 2004	58 years, 204 days	Megawati m. 25 March 1973
6		Kristiani Herrawati; 6 July 1952 – 1 June 2019 (aged 66)	20 October 2004 – 20 October 2014	52 years, 106 days	Yudhoyono m. 30 July 1976
7		Iriana; Born 1 October 1963 (age 62)	20 October 2014 – 20 October 2024	51 years, 19 days	Jokowi m. 24 December 1986
8	Vacant		20 October 2024 – present	Vacant	Prabowo; Separated since 1998

== Gallery ==
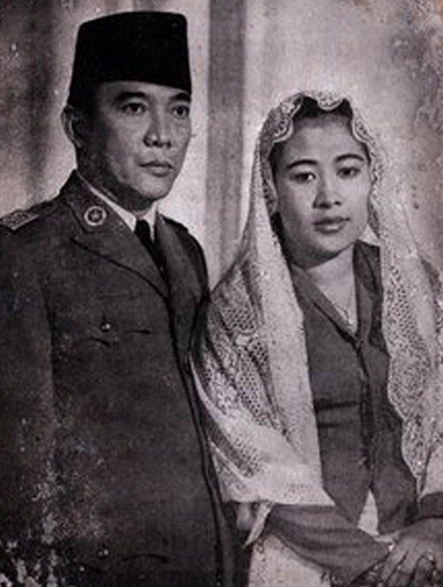
President Sukarno and First Lady Fatmawati

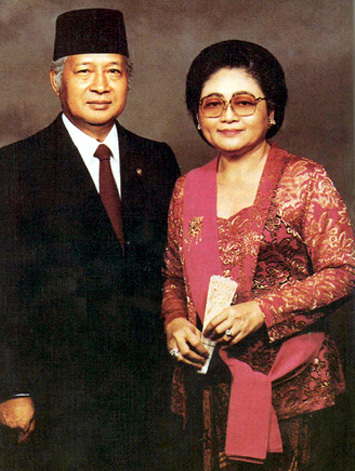
President Suharto and First Lady Siti Hartinah

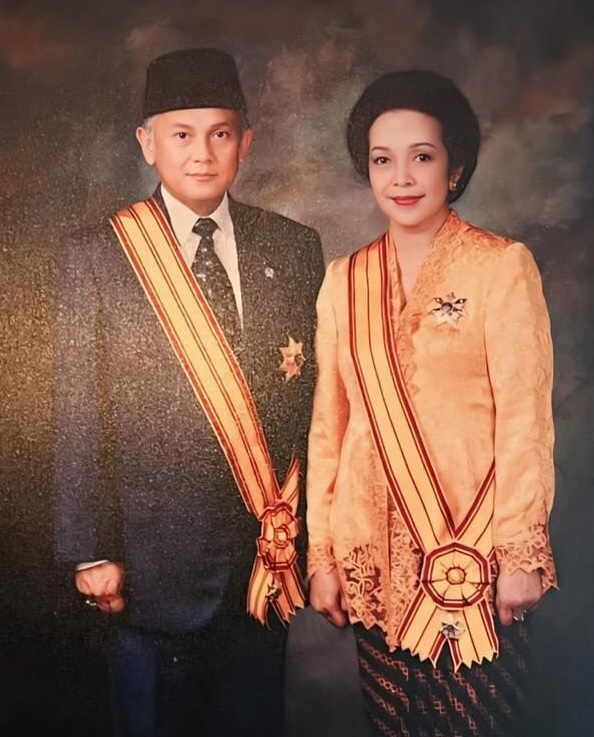
President B. J. Habibie and First Lady Hasri Ainun Besari

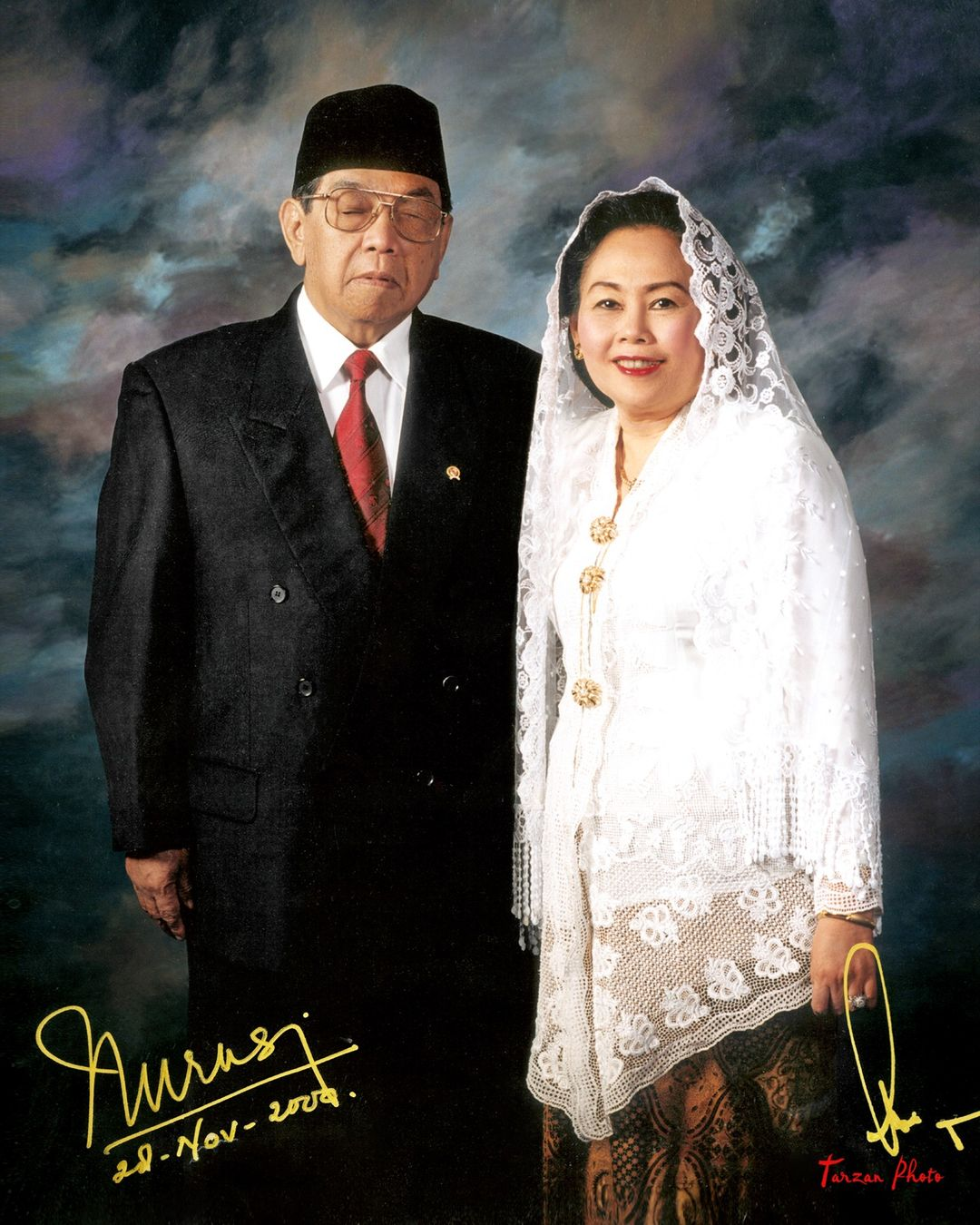
President Abdurrahman Wahid and First Lady Sinta Nuriyah

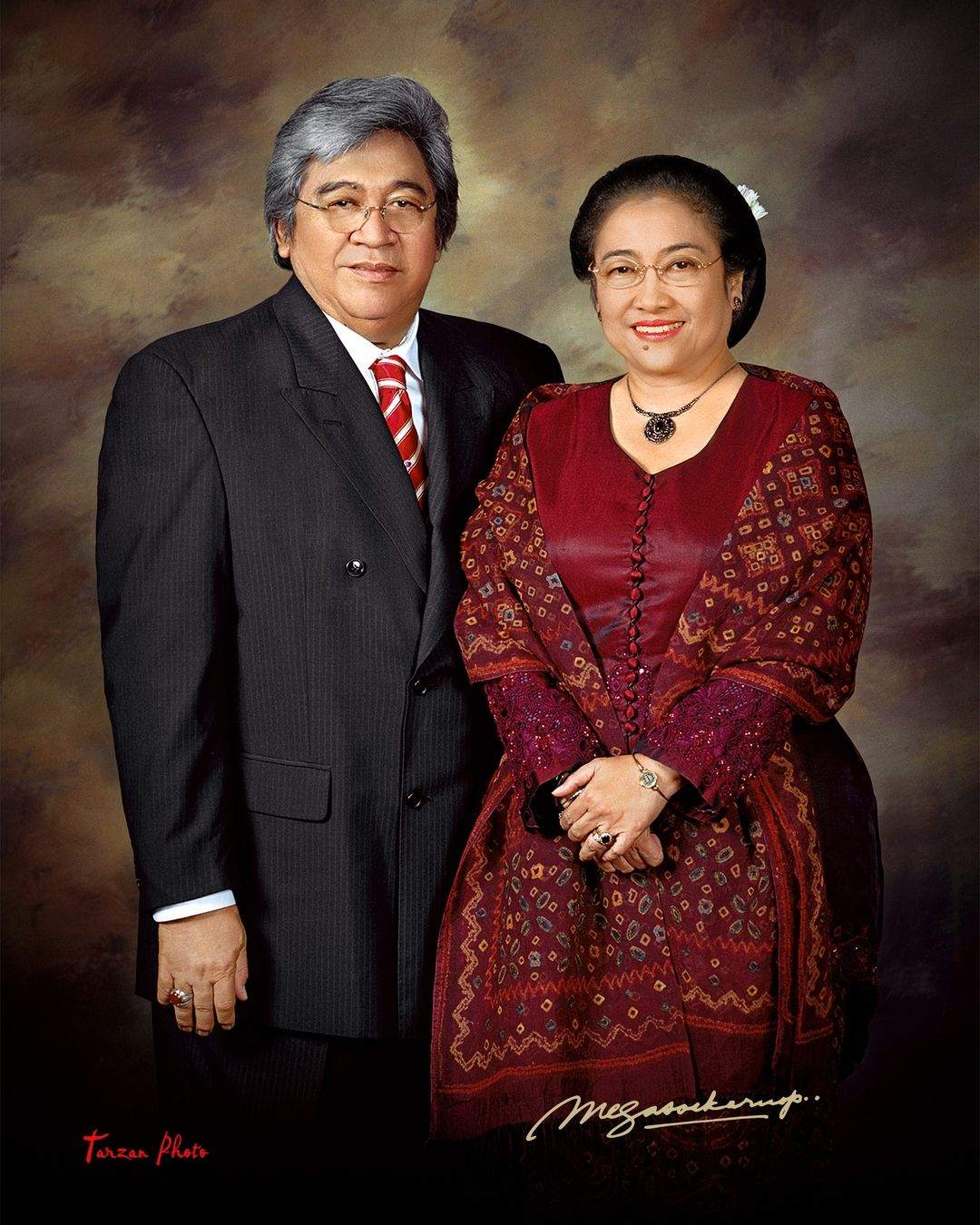
President Megawati Sukarnoputri and First Gentleman Taufiq Kiemas

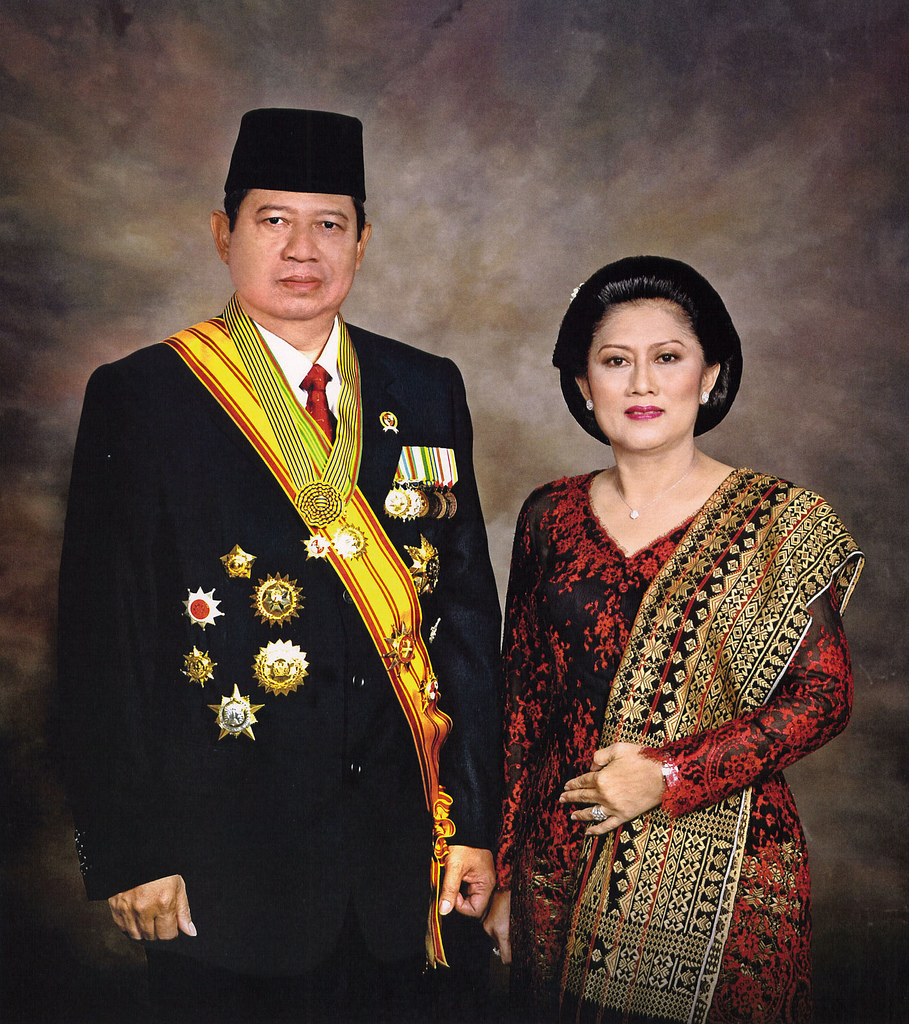
President Susilo Bambang Yudhoyono and First Lady Kristiani Herrawati

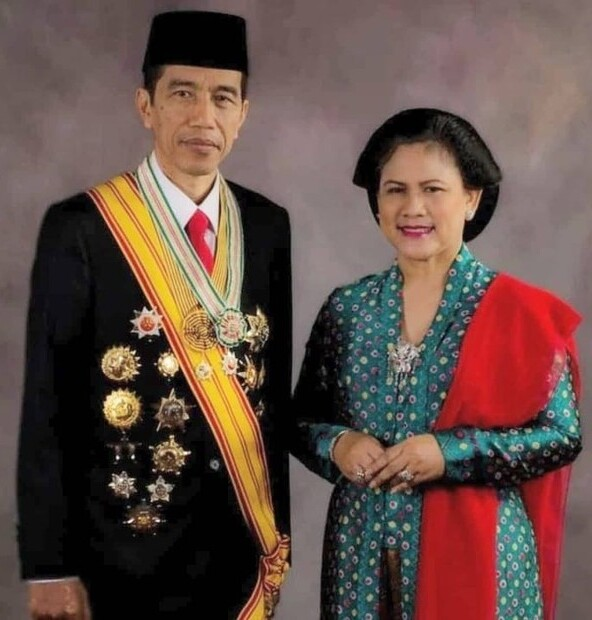
President Joko Widodo and First Lady Iriana

== See also ==
- List of presidents of Indonesia
- Second ladies and gentlemen of Indonesia
- List of vice presidents of Indonesia
- Prime Minister of Indonesia
