= Sinta Nuriyah =

4th First Lady of Indonesia (born 1948)

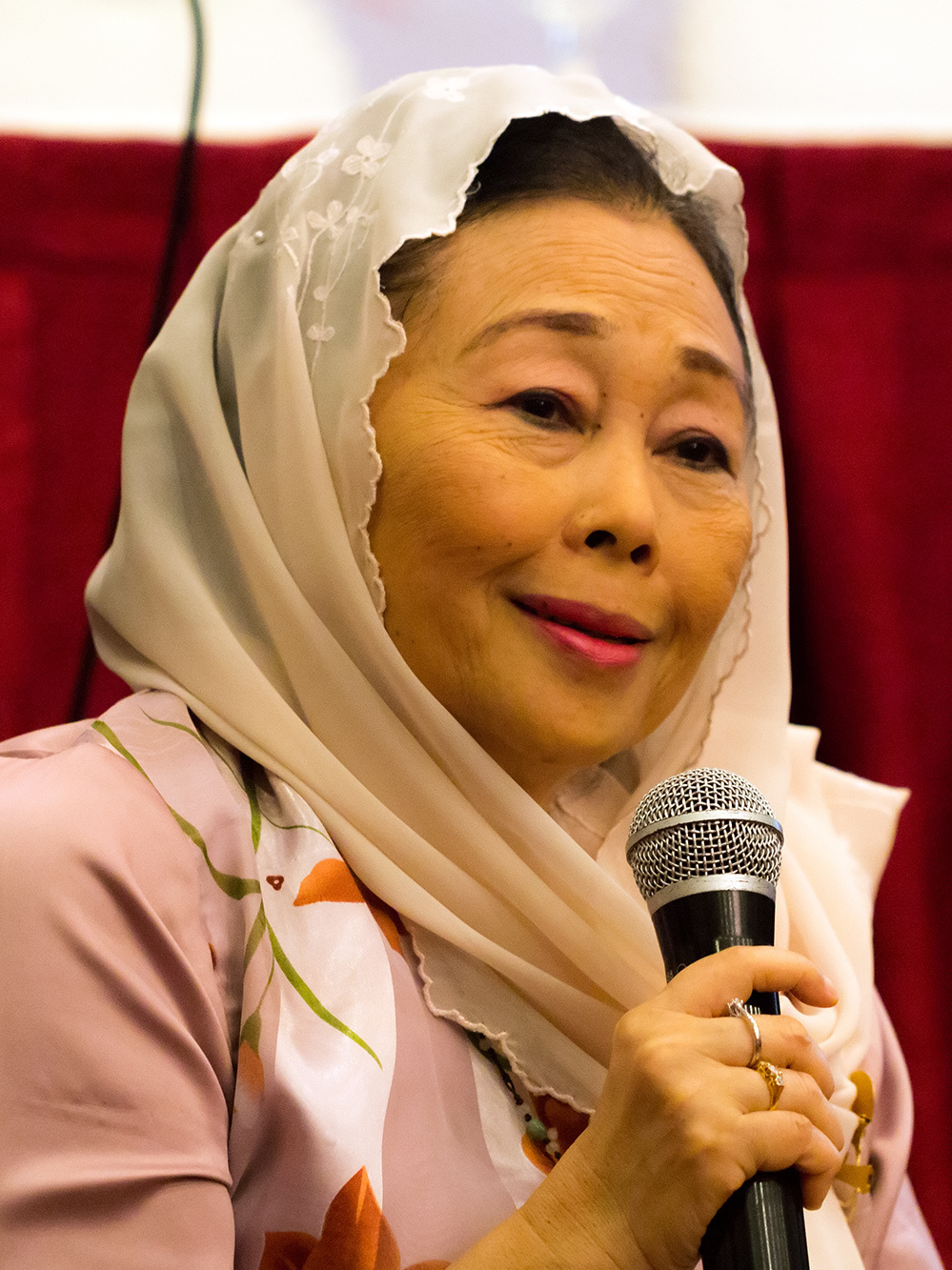
- Sinta Nuriyah in 2016

First Lady of Indonesia
- In role 20 October 1999 – 23 July 2001
- President: Abdurrahman Wahid
- Preceded by: Hasri Ainun Habibie
- Succeeded by: Taufiq Kiemas (as First Gentleman)

Personal details
- Born: 8 March 1948 (age 78) Djombang, Indonesia
- Spouse: Abdurrahman Wahid (m. 1968; died 2009)
- Relations: Wahid Hasyim (father-in-law); Salahuddin Wahid (brother-in-law)
- Children: 4, including Yenny Wahid
- Education: Sunan Kalijaga State Islamic University; University of Indonesia
- Occupation: Female activist; journalist

Sinta Nuriyah Wahid (also Sinta Wahid; 8 March 1948) is the widow of former Indonesian President Abdurrahman Wahid. She was First Lady of Indonesia from 1999 to 2001.

== Biography ==
Sinta was born in Jombang Regency in 1948, the eldest daughter of 18 children. She attended an Islamic boarding school, where, at age 13, she fell in love with Wahid, who taught there. After her father, a professional calligrapher, refused to approve the marriage, Wahid, whose father was the leader of Nahdlatul Ulama, went abroad to study. When Wahid proposed again from Baghdad, Sinta accepted, marrying him three years before he returned to Indonesia in a ceremony where Wahid's grandfather stood in as a proxy.

After Wahid returned in 1971, Sinta finished a degree in Sharia law. She helped support their four children by making and selling candies.

In 1992, Sinta was in a car accident that left her paralyzed from the waist down. It took a year of physical therapy before she was able to move her arms. She then finished her women's studies graduate degree at the University of Indonesia by having university staff carry her on a stretcher up to the building's fourth floor.

Since her husband's impeachment in 2001, Sinta has been an outspoken defender of moderate Islam. She has pursued a tradition of holding inter-faith meals during Ramadan. She has praised the bravery of Governor Basuki Tjahaja Purnama and has criticized polygamy as unfair. After she was threatened by extremists, the Banser militia mobilized to protect her events. She was included in the TIME 100 list as one of The Most Influential People in 2018.

Honorary titles
Preceded by Hasri Ainun Habibie	First Lady of Indonesia; 20 October 1999 – 23 July 2001	Succeeded by Taufiq Kiemas as First Gentleman
