= List of presidents of Indonesia =

Montage of Indonesian president portraits. Chronologically from left to right, top to bottom

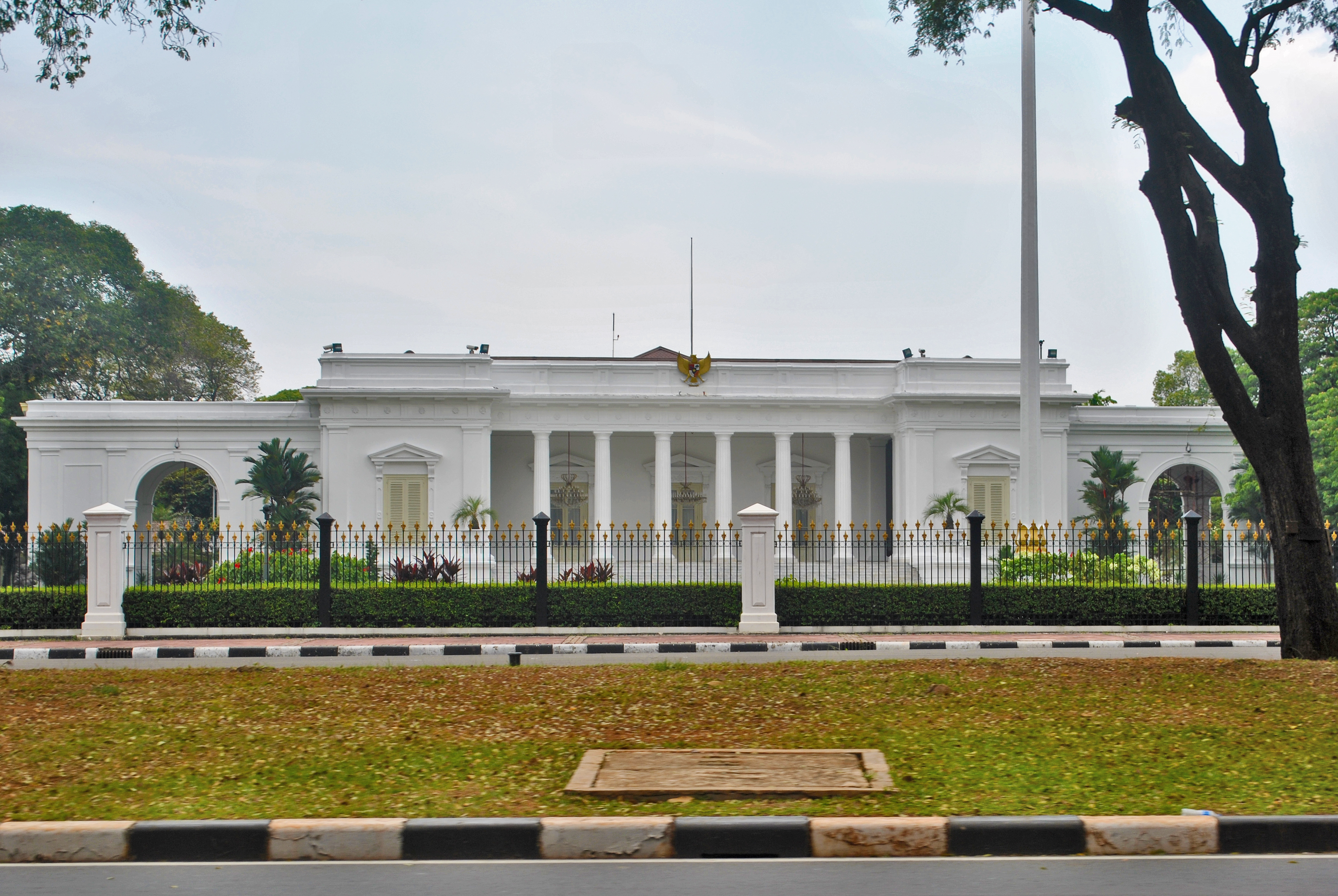
Merdeka Palace, the official residence of the president of Indonesia

The president of Indonesia is the head of state and also head of government of the Republic of Indonesia. The president leads the executive branch of the Indonesian government and is the supreme commander of the Indonesian National Armed Forces. Since 2004, the President and Vice-president are directly elected to a five-year term. The presidency was established during the formulation of the 1945 constitution by the Investigating Committee for Preparatory Work for Independence (BPUPK), a body established by the occupying Japanese 16th Army on 1 March 1945 to work on "preparations for independence in the region of the government of this island of Java." On 18 August 1945, the Preparatory Committee for Indonesian Independence (PPKI), which was created on 7 August to replace the BPUPK, selected Sukarno as the country's first president.

== Presidents ==
Independent
Military
Golkar
National Awakening Party (PKB)
Indonesian Democratic Party of Struggle (PDI-P)
Democratic Party (Demokrat)
Gerindra

Note: — denotes acting president

No.	Portrait	Name (Lifespan)	Term of office				Party	Vice president	
No.	Portrait	Name (Lifespan)	Took office	Left office	Election	Time in office	Party	Vice president	
1		Sukarno (1901–1970)	18 August 1945	18 May 1963	1945	21 years, 206 days	Independent	1	Mohammad Hatta
1		Sukarno (1901–1970)	18 August 1945	18 May 1963	1945	21 years, 206 days	Independent	Vacant (1 December 1956 – 12 March 1967)	
1		Sukarno (1901–1970)	18 May 1963	12 March 1967	1963	21 years, 206 days	Independent	Vacant (1 December 1956 – 12 March 1967)	
1		Sukarno (1901–1970)	Declared Indonesia's independence from colonial powers. Presided during the Indonesian National Revolution and the first national elections. One of the founding fathers of the Non-Aligned Movement and hosted the 1955 Bandung Conference. Called for 'Guided Democracy' following the collapse of 10 governments during the 1950s, with Nasakom as its principal ideology. Acceded Western New Guinea. Opposed the formation of Malaysia and initiated Konfrontasi. Signed Supersemar in 1966 following the assassination of six generals. He was the youngest person to become President of Indonesia at 44 years old.						
—		Suharto (1921–2008)	12 March 1967	27 March 1968	—	1 year, 15 days	Military	Vacant	
—		Suharto (1921–2008)	Sukarno transferred key presidential powers to Suharto on 11 March 1966 in a vaguely worded letter of authority known as Supersemar and surrendered his powers on 20 February 1967, but he was not formally relieved of his presidential title by the MPRS until 12 March 1967. On 12 March 1967, the MPRS agreed to withdraw its mandate from Sukarno and remove him as president. Suharto replaced Sukarno as acting president until 27 March 1968, when he was formally elected as the second president of Indonesia.						
2		Suharto (1921–2008)	27 March 1968	23 March 1973	1968	30 years, 55 days	Golkar (supported by the military)	Vacant	
2		Suharto (1921–2008)	23 March 1973	23 March 1978	1973	30 years, 55 days	Golkar (supported by the military)	2	Hamengkubuwono IX
2		Suharto (1921–2008)	23 March 1978	11 March 1983	1978	30 years, 55 days	Golkar (supported by the military)	3	Adam Malik
2		Suharto (1921–2008)	11 March 1983	11 March 1988	1983	30 years, 55 days	Golkar (supported by the military)	4	Umar Wirahadikusumah
2		Suharto (1921–2008)	11 March 1988	11 March 1993	1988	30 years, 55 days	Golkar (supported by the military)	5	Sudharmono
2		Suharto (1921–2008)	11 March 1993	11 March 1998	1993	30 years, 55 days	Golkar (supported by the military)	6	Try Sutrisno
2		Suharto (1921–2008)	11 March 1998	21 May 1998	1998	30 years, 55 days	Golkar (supported by the military)	7	B. J. Habibie
2		Suharto (1921–2008)	First president from a military background. The longest-serving president with an over-30-year tenure. Seized power from Sukarno through Supersemar in 1966. Declared a New Order military dictatorship. Dismantled the Communist Party of Indonesia and oversaw the mass murder and imprisonment of thousands of suspected communists throughout the archipelago. Ended Konfrontasi and initiated friendly relationships with neighbouring countries of Malaysia and Singapore, and Indonesia became a founding member of the Association of Southeast Asian Nations and the Asia-Pacific Economic Cooperation. Severed ties with China and other communist countries in the region. Incorporated Western New Guinea into Indonesia. Annexed East Timor. Oversaw great economic and infrastructural development but rampant corruption within the bureaucracy and government. Resigned following the collapse of the Indonesian economy during the 1997 financial crisis and the 1998 riots.						
3		B. J. Habibie (1936–2019)	21 May 1998	20 October 1999	—	1 year, 152 days	Golkar	Vacant	
3		B. J. Habibie (1936–2019)	First, and to date the only, president (aside from acting presidents) who was born outside of Java. First vice president to become president. Took power following Suharto's resignation. Oversaw Indonesia's democratic transition. East Timor declared independence from Indonesia. Released thousands of political prisoners. Decided not to run for a full term.						
4		Abdurrahman Wahid (1940–2009)	20 October 1999	23 July 2001	1999	1 year, 276 days	PKB	Vacant (20–21 October 1999)	
4		Abdurrahman Wahid (1940–2009)	20 October 1999	23 July 2001	1999	1 year, 276 days	PKB	8	Megawati Sukarnoputri
4		Abdurrahman Wahid (1940–2009)	First executive branch officer (president and vice president) to have come from a religious background, also first to have had physical disabilities. Head of Nahdlatul Ulama and grandson of its founder. Term embroiled by a number of scandals and corruption cases. Abolished all remaining legal discrimination against Chinese Indonesians. Attempts to reform the military and remove its political power were not taken kindly by military actors. Attempted to dissolve parliament, but was himself impeached and removed from office by parliament.						
5		Megawati Sukarnoputri (born 1947)	23 July 2001	20 October 2004	—	3 years, 89 days	PDI-P	Vacant (23–26 July 2001)	
5		Megawati Sukarnoputri (born 1947)	23 July 2001	20 October 2004	—	3 years, 89 days	PDI-P	9	Hamzah Haz
5		Megawati Sukarnoputri (born 1947)	First female president of Indonesia and the first to be born after the proclamation of independence in 1945. Oldest daughter and second child of President Sukarno, first president born to another president. First female vice president and the first vice president to be born after 1945. Came to power following the removal of Abdurrahman Wahid. Presided during a period of economic growth. Bali was attacked by a major bombing in 2002 by Jemaah Islamiyah. Lost reelection bid to her former coordinating minister and in a later rematch.						
6		Susilo Bambang Yudhoyono (born 1949)	20 October 2004	20 October 2009	2004	10 years	Demokrat	10	Jusuf Kalla
6		Susilo Bambang Yudhoyono (born 1949)	20 October 2009	20 October 2014	2009	10 years	Demokrat	11	Boediono
6		Susilo Bambang Yudhoyono (born 1949)	The first president to be directly elected by popular vote. Second president from a military background. Parts of Sumatra were devastated by the 2004 Indian Ocean earthquake and tsunami. Jemaah Islamiyah was severely weakened following efforts by Detachment 88. Indonesia was classified as part of MINT and became a member of the G20 during his presidency. First elected president to serve a full term, and the first to complete two terms. Reelected to a second term in 2009. Indonesia formed the Bali Democracy Forum and became a founding member of the Open Government Partnership. He presided over consistent economic growth. During his second term, the Democratic Party was embroiled by many corruption scandals.						
7		Joko Widodo (born 1961)	20 October 2014	20 October 2019	2014	10 years	PDI-P	12 (10)	Jusuf Kalla
7		Joko Widodo (born 1961)	20 October 2019	20 October 2024	2019	10 years	PDI-P	13	Ma'ruf Amin
7		Joko Widodo (born 1961)	The first president not to have emerged from the country's political elite or to have been an army general. First president to have been a regional politician (mayor for about seven years, governor for nearly two years) and the first to be born after the recognition of independence in December 1949. Elected to a second term in 2019. Initiated the process to move the capital of Indonesia from Jakarta to Nusantara.						
8		Prabowo Subianto (born 1951)	20 October 2024	Incumbent	2024	2 years, 32 days	Gerindra	14	Gibran Rakabuming Raka
8		Prabowo Subianto (born 1951)	20 October 2024	Incumbent	2024	2 years, 32 days	Gerindra	Vacant (12 November 2026–present)	
8		Prabowo Subianto (born 1951)	Retired general and former commander of the Special Forces Command (Kopassus) and Army Strategic Reserve Command (Kostrad). Lost twice against his predecessor in 2014 and 2019 but was appointed as minister of defense in 2019. His 96.2 million votes are the highest received by any candidate in a democratic election in Indonesia, surpassing Joko Widodo's 85.6 million votes in 2019. First president to have a younger predecessor. The oldest president to be sworn in for a first term (aged 73). Third president from a military background.						

== By age ==
#	President	Born	Age at start of presidency	Age at end of presidency	Post-presidency timespan	Lifespan	
#	President	Born	Age at start of presidency	Age at end of presidency	Post-presidency timespan	Died	Age
1	Sukarno	6 June 1901	44 years, 73 days 18 August 1945	65 years, 279 days 12 March 1967 (Note: Removed from office)	3 years, 101 days	21 June 1970	69 years, 15 days
2	Suharto	8 June 1921	45 years, 277 days 12 March 1967	76 years, 347 days 21 May 1998 (Note: Resigned from office)	9 years, 251 days	27 January 2008	86 years, 233 days
3	B. J. Habibie	25 June 1936	61 years, 330 days 21 May 1998	63 years, 117 days 20 October 1999	19 years, 326 days	11 September 2019	83 years, 78 days
4	Abdurrahman Wahid	7 September 1940	59 years, 43 days 20 October 1999	60 years, 319 days 23 July 2001	8 years, 160 days	30 December 2009	69 years, 114 days
5	Megawati Sukarnoputri	23 January 1947	54 years, 181 days 23 July 2001	57 years, 271 days 20 October 2004	22 years, 32 days	(living)	79 years, 302 days
6	Susilo Bambang Yudhoyono	9 September 1949	55 years, 41 days 20 October 2004	65 years, 41 days 20 October 2014	12 years, 32 days	(living)	77 years, 73 days
7	Joko Widodo	21 June 1961	53 years, 121 days 20 October 2014	63 years, 121 days 20 October 2024	2 years, 32 days	(living)	65 years, 153 days
8	Prabowo Subianto	17 October 1951	73 years, 3 days 20 October 2024	(incumbent)	(incumbent)	(living)	75 years, 35 days

== By time in office ==
Rank	President	Length in days	Order of presidency	Number of terms
1	Suharto	11,393 (Note: Suharto was acting president until 27 March 1968 (381 days), when he was made full president)	2nd • 12 March 1967 – 21 May 1998 (Note: Resigned from office)	Six full terms; resigned 2 months and 11 days into seventh term
2	Sukarno	7,876 (Note: Sukarno was detained by Dutch troops on 19 December 1948 during the Operation Kraai. During this time, the Emergency Government of the Republic of Indonesia, led by Sjafruddin Prawiranegara, acted as the country's government-in-exile until 13 July 1949. As a result, Sukarno's term in office actually had 206 days less. This figure includes his term as the president of the United States of Indonesia (27 December 1949 – 15 August 1950; 231 days), which was coterminous with Assaat being president of the constituent Republic of Indonesia.)	1st • 18 August 1945 – 12 March 1967 (Note: Removed from office)	De jure: Four full terms; removed 1 year, 6 months, and 22 days into fifth term De facto: Never faced reelection, declared president for life by the Provisional People's Consultative Assembly (MPRS) on 18 May 1963
3	Joko Widodo	3,653 (Note: His terms had a total of three leap days instead of two.)	7th • 20 October 2014 – 20 October 2024	Two full terms
4	Susilo Bambang Yudhoyono	3,652	6th • 20 October 2004 – 20 October 2014	Two full terms
5	Megawati Sukarnoputri	1,185	5th • 23 July 2001 (Note: Succeeded to presidency) – 20 October 2004	One partial term (3 years, 2 months, and 27 days) (Note: Sought election to a full term in 2004, but was defeated.)
6	Prabowo Subianto	762 (Note: As of 21 November 2026)	8th • 20 October 2024 – Incumbent	Currently serving first term
7	Abdurrahman Wahid	642	4th • 20 October 1999 – 23 July 2001	One partial term (1 year, 9 months, and 3 days)
8	B. J. Habibie	517	3rd • 21 May 1998 – 20 October 1999	One partial term (1 year, 4 months, and 29 days) (Note: Originally assigned to office until 10 March 2003, but due to the accelerated election, he was required to face reelection, in which he did not contest after his accountability speech was rejected by the MPR.)
Acting	Assaat	231	27 December 1949 (Note: Acting president) – 15 August 1950	State-level president (Note: President of the State of the Republic of Indonesia after Dutch–Indonesian Round Table Conference, while Sukarno became president of United States of Indonesia.) for 7 months and 19 days
Acting	Sjafruddin Prawiranegara	203	22 December 1948 – 13 July 1949	Acting president (Note: President of emergency government during Indonesian National Revolution, after both Sukarno and Hatta were captured by the Dutch authorities after the second police action.) for 6 months and 21 days

== See also ==
- Governor-General of the Dutch East Indies
  - List of governors of the Dutch East Indies
- President of Indonesia
- Vice President of Indonesia
  - List of vice presidents of Indonesia
- Prime Minister of Indonesia
- First ladies and gentlemen of Indonesia
- Second ladies and gentlemen of Indonesia
- List of acting presidents of Indonesia
