= List of acting presidents of Indonesia =

Temporary head of states of Indonesia

The Acting President of Indonesia was the position held by people who had temporarily served as the head of state of Indonesia, there are currently four people who have served as temporary presidents of Indonesia.

Sjafruddin Prawiranegara was the first person who served as the head of state of Indonesia during the Indonesian National Revolution, he led the emergency government after both Sukarno and Hatta were captured by the Dutch authorities after the second police action. Another acting president was Mr. Assaat, the head of state of the Yogyakarta-based republic from 1949 to 1950, thus it named him as one of the acting presidents of Indonesia.

However, there was another acting president, Sartono. His term was much shorter, lasting only five months (6 January 1959 – 2 July 1959). His resigned himself 3 days before the President Sukarno's 1959 Decree and the transition to the Guided Democracy government, making him as the "shortest-serving president in Indonesia's history".

Suharto served as Indonesia's acting president from 1967 to 1968 before he was sworn in as president by the parliament in 1968.

== List of acting presidents ==
Portrait	Name (Lifespan)	Government	Took office	Left office
	Sjafruddin Prawiranegara (1911–1989)	PDRI (Emergency Cabinet)	22 December 1948	13 July 1949
	Assaat Datuk Mudo (1904–1976)	Republic of Indonesia (1949–1950)	27 December 1949	15 August 1950
	Sartono (1900–1968)	Liberal democracy	6 January 1959	2 July 1959
	Suharto (1921–2008)	New Order (Indonesia)	12 March 1967	27 March 1968

== See also ==
- President of Indonesia
  - List of presidents of Indonesia
- Vice President of Indonesia
- Prime Minister of Indonesia
