= Inauguration of Megawati Sukarnoputri =

Indonesian presidential inauguration

Presidential inauguration of Megawati Sukarnoputri
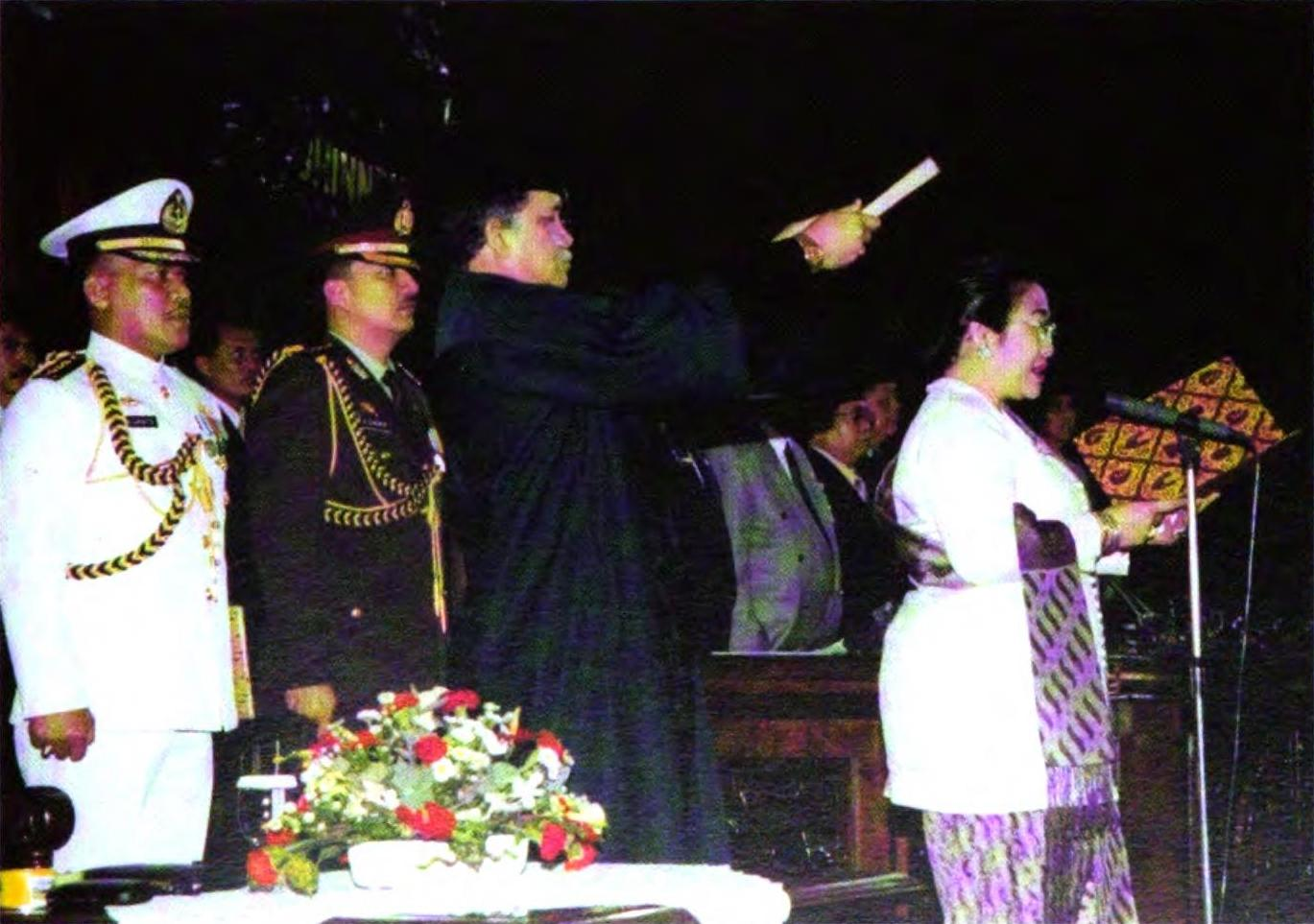
- President Megawati Sukarnoputri taking the presidential oath in 2001
- Date: 23 July 2001; 24 years ago
- Location: Parliamentary Complex, Jakarta
- Organized by: People's Consultative Assembly
- Participants: Megawati Sukarnoputri 5th president of Indonesia; — Assuming office

The inauguration of Megawati Sukarnoputri as the 5th president of Indonesia took place on Monday, 23 July 2001. The ceremony was held at the Parliamentary Complex shortly after the MPR vote her to become president, the ceremony also marked the end of Abdurrahman Wahid's term as president following his impeachment after the presidential decree on the same day.

== Background ==
Megawati Sukarnoputri was the first female vice president of Indonesia and the first female president of Indonesia, she was elected as a president by the MPR after the impeachment and forced step down of Abdurrahman Wahid, following the Abdurrahman Wahid's 23 July 2001 Decree.

On 23 July 2001, as a response to Abdurrahman Wahid's Decree, the People's Consultative Assembly (MPR) held a special session to impeach Wahid and subsequently swear in Megawati as the new president. The MPR held a plenary meeting to make a vote on Abdurrahman Wahid's Impeachment on 23 July 2001, there were factions from F-KB and F-PDKB that participated in the voting. The result of the vote was 591 votes in favor of dismissing President Abdurrahman Wahid as well as appointing Vice President Megawati Sukarnoputri to replace the President. The MPR Special Session in 2001 resulted in MPR RI Edict Number III/MPR/2001 on the Appointment of Vice President Megawati Sukarnoputri as President of the Republic of Indonesia.

== See also ==
- Inauguration of Abdurrahman Wahid
- Abdurrahman Wahid's 23 July 2001 Decree
