= Inauguration of Susilo Bambang Yudhoyono =

Inauguration of Susilo Bambang Yudhoyono may refer to:

- First inauguration of Susilo Bambang Yudhoyono, 2004
- Second inauguration of Susilo Bambang Yudhoyono, 2009
