= Transition to the New Order =

Period of Indonesian history, 1966–1967

- 30 September 1965 – 27 March 1968
Guided Democracy	New Order
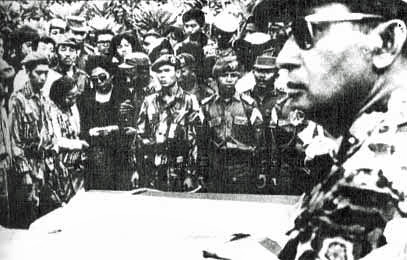
- Major General Suharto (at right, in the foreground) attending the funeral of assassinated generals on 5 October 1965
- Leaders: Sukarno (until 12 March 1967); Suharto (from 12 March 1967)
- Key events: 30 September Movement; Indonesian mass killings of 1965–66; KAMI mass demonstration; Signing of Supersemar; Acting presidency of Suharto; First inauguration of Suharto

Indonesia's transition to the New Order in the mid-1960s ousted the country's first president, Sukarno, after 22 years in the position. One of the most tumultuous periods in the country's modern history, it was also the commencement of Suharto's 32-year presidency.

Described as the great dhalang ("puppet master" or "puppeteer"), Sukarno drew power from balancing the opposing and increasingly antagonistic forces of the Army and the Indonesian Communist Party (PKI). By 1965, the PKI had extensively penetrated all levels of government and had gained influence at the expense of the army.

On 30 September 1965, six of the military's most senior officers were tortured and killed (generally labelled an "attempted coup") by the so-called 30 September Movement, a battalion of soldiers from the Tjakrabirawa Regiment (Presidential Guard). Within a few hours, Major General Suharto mobilised forces under his command and took control of Jakarta. Anti-communists, initially following the army's lead, went on a violent purge of communists throughout the country, which killed between 500,000 and 1 million people and led to the banning and dissolution of the PKI, which was officially blamed for the attempted coup and crisis. These mass killings were backed by Western intelligence agencies including those from the United States and the United Kingdom.

The politically weakened Sukarno was forced to transfer key political and military powers to General Suharto, who had become head of the armed forces. In March 1967, the Indonesian parliament (MPRS) named General Suharto acting president. He was formally elected president one year later. Sukarno lived under house arrest until his death in 1970.

== Background ==
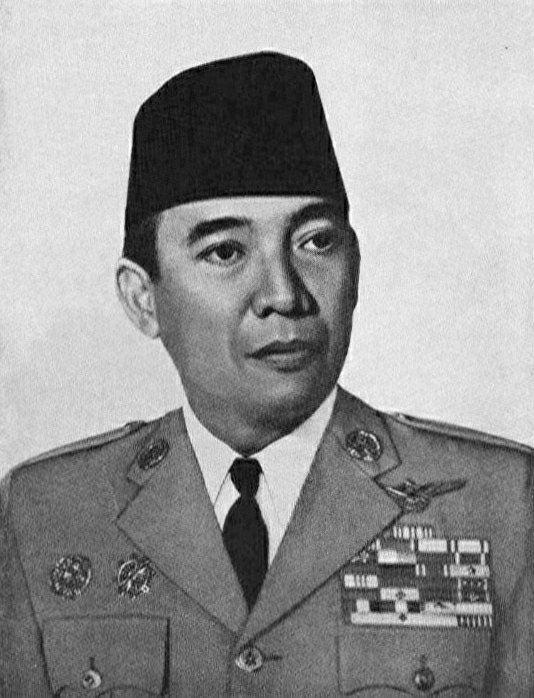
President Sukarno

The nationalist leader Sukarno had declared Indonesian independence in 1945 and was appointed president. After an internal national revolution and struggle against the former Dutch colonial government, Sukarno had managed to hold together the diverse country; however, his administration had not been able to provide a viable economic system to lift its citizens out of severe poverty. He stressed socialist policies domestically and an avidly anti-imperialist international policy, underpinned by an authoritarian style of rule dependent upon his charismatic personality. Pursuing an independent Indonesian foreign policy, Sukarno developed friendly ties with the Eastern Bloc and the People's Republic of China but courted friendly relations with the United States at the same time in his efforts to maximise Indonesian bargaining power in its foreign policy. Sukarno was also a pioneering figure in developing the Non-Aligned Movement by playing a lead role in hosting the Bandung Conference in 1955. In Indonesia's domestic politics, Sukarno also carefully balanced Indonesia's various political parties, including the PKI.

From the late 1950s, political conflict and economic deterioration worsened. By the mid-1960s, the cash-strapped government had to scrap critical public sector subsidies, estimates put annual inflation at 500–1,000%, export revenues were shrinking, infrastructure crumbling, and factories were operating at minimal capacity with negligible investment. Severe poverty and hunger were widespread, and Sukarno led his country in a military confrontation with Malaysia while stepping up revolutionary and anti-western rhetoric.

Described as the great dhalang ("puppet master"), President Sukarno's position came to depend on balancing the opposing and increasingly hostile forces of the army and the PKI. His anti-imperial ideology saw Indonesia increasingly dependent on the Soviet Union and China. By 1965, at the height of the Cold War, the PKI penetrated all levels of government extensively. With the support of Sukarno and the air force, the party gained increasing influence at the expense of the army, thus ensuring the army's enmity. By late 1965, the army was divided between a left-wing faction allied with the PKI and a right-wing faction that was being courted by the United States.

=== Military split ===
The same policies, however, won Sukarno few friends and many enemies in the Western world, especially including the United States and the United Kingdom, whose investors were increasingly angered by Sukarno's nationalisation of mineral, agricultural, and energy assets. In need of Indonesian allies in the Cold War against the Soviet Union, the United States cultivated a number of ties with officers of the military through exchanges and arms deals. That fostered a split in the military's ranks, with the United States and others backing a right-wing faction against a left-wing faction overlapping with the PKI.

When Sukarno rejected food aid from United States Agency for International Development, thereby exacerbating famine conditions, the right wing of the military adopted a regional command structure through which it could smuggle staple commodities to win the loyalty of the rural population. In an attempt to curtail the increasing power of the right, the PKI and the left wing of the military formed several peasant and other mass organisations.

=== Indonesia–Malaysia confrontation ===
1966 ABC report discussing the Indonesian political context of Konfrontasi

In 1963, a policy of Konfrontasi (Confrontation) against the newly-formed Federation of Malaysia was announced by the Sukarno regime. This further exacerbated the split between the left-wing and right-wing military factions, with the left-wing faction and the Communist Party taking part in guerrilla raids on the border with Malaysia, while the right-wing faction was mostly absent from the conflict (whether by choice or orders of Sukarno is not clear).

The Confrontation further encouraged the West to seek ways to topple Sukarno, who was viewed as a growing threat to Southeast Asian regional stability (as with North Vietnam under the domino theory). The deepening of the armed conflict came close to all-out warfare by 1965, increased the widespread dissatisfaction with the Sukarno regime, and strengthened the hand of the right-wing generals whose forces were still close to the centre of power in Jakarta.

== Collapse of Guided Democracy ==
=== 30 September Movement ===
On the night of 30 September – 1 October 1965, six senior army generals were kidnapped and executed in Jakarta by a battalion of soldiers from the Tjakrabirawa Regiment (Presidential Guard) in an "attempted coup". The right faction among the top generals was wiped out, including the powerful Chief of Staff of the Army, Ahmad Yani, but the Minister of Defence, Abdul Haris Nasution, escaped. Around 2,000 troops from coup groups occupied three sides of Merdeka Square, and commanded the Presidential Palace, radio station, and telecommunications centre, but did not occupy the east side, site of Kostrad headquarters. Calling themselves the "30 September Movement", the group announced on radio around 7 am that they were trying to stop a military coup backed by the US Central Intelligence Agency (CIA) that was planned to remove Sukarno from power.

They claimed to have arrested several generals belonging to a conspiracy, the "Council of Generals", that had plotted a military coup against the government of President Sukarno. They further alleged that this coup was to take place on Armed Forces Day (5 October) with the backing of the CIA and that the council would then install themselves as a military junta. Furthermore, the soldiers proclaimed the establishment of a "Revolutionary Council" consisting of various well-known military officers and civilian leaders that would be the highest authority in Indonesia. Additionally, they declared President Sukarno's Dwikora Cabinet as invalid ("demisioner").

According to one chief conspirator, Lt. Col. Latief, the Palace Guards had not attempted to kill or capture Major General Suharto, commander of Kostrad (Komando Strategi dan Cadangan TNI Angkatan Darat – the Army Strategic Reserve Command), because he was considered a Sukarno loyalist. Suharto, along with the surviving General Nasution, made the counter-allegation that the G30S was a rebellious movement that sought to replace President Sukarno's government with a Communist government under the PKI, whose leaders were cabinet ministers without portfolio. Upon hearing of the radio announcement, Suharto and Nasution began consolidating their forces, successfully gaining the loyalty of Jakarta Garrison Commander Maj. Gen. Umar Wirahadikusumah and Colonel Sarwo Edhie Wibowo, the commander of army special forces RPKAD (Resimen Para Komando Angkatan Darat – the Army's Para-Commando Regiment).

During the evening of 1 October, RPKAD soldiers recaptured RRI and Telecommunications Building without any resistance as the rebel soldiers had retreated to Halim Air Force Base. RPKAD forces proceeded to attack Halim Perdanakusumah AF Base on the morning of 2 October but was stopped by the rebel soldiers in a fierce gunbattle in which several fatalities were inflicted on both sides. A direct order from President Sukarno managed to secure the surrender of the rebel soldiers by noon, after which Suhartoist forces occupied the base. On 4 October, the generals' bodies were discovered at Halim, and on 5 October (Armed Forces Day) a large public funeral was held.

=== Internal military power-struggle ===
The killing of the generals saw influence in the Army fall to those more willing to stand up to Sukarno and the Army's enemies on the left. After the assassinations of those generals, the highest-ranking officer in the Indonesian military, and third-highest in the overall chain-of-command, was the Defense Minister and Armed Forces Chief-of-Staff Gen. Abdul Haris Nasution, a member of the right-wing camp. On 2 October, Suharto accepted Sukarno's order for him to take control of the army, but on the condition that Suharto personally have authority to restore order and security. The 1 November formation of Kopkamtib (Komando Operasi Pemulihan Keamanan dan Ketertiban, or Operational Command for the Restoration of Security and Order), formalised this authority and Suharto was appointed its first commanding general. However, on 5 October Sukarno moved to appoint Maj. Gen. Pranoto Reksosamudro, considered a Sukarno loyalist, to the office of Chief of Staff of the Army to fill the vacancy caused by Yani's death.

After the promotion, The New York Times reported that an unnamed Western "diplomatic report" alleged that Pranoto was a former member of the PKI. Pranoto's alleged communism, as well as his timely promotion, led them to promote the view that the PKI and Sukarno conspired to assassinate the generals to consolidate their grip on power.

In the aftermath of the assassinations, however, Suharto and his KOSTRAD (Army Strategic Reserve Command) units were closest to Jakarta. By default, Suharto became the field general in charge of the prosecution of the G30S. Later, at the insistence of Gen. Nasution, Pranoto was relieved of his post, and Suharto was in his stead appointed the new Chief-of-Staff of the Army effective on 14 October 1965.

=== Anti-communist purge ===
In early October, a military propaganda campaign began to sweep the country, successfully convincing both Indonesian and international audiences that it was a Communist coup and that the murders were cowardly atrocities against Indonesian heroes. 30 September Movement was called Gestapu (from Gerakan September Tigapuluh, "30 September Movement"). The Army, acting on orders by Suharto and supervised by Minister of Defense Nasution, began a campaign of agitation and incitement to violence among Indonesian civilians aimed at the Communist community and toward President Sukarno himself. PKI's denials of involvement had little effect. The regime was quickly destabilised, with the Army the only force left to maintain order.

At the funeral of Nasution's daughter Irma, Chief of Staff of the Navy Admiral Eddy Martadinata gave Muslim leaders the signal to attack Communists and their allies, who then responded with calls for Holy War against the PKI and its member and affiliate organisations in Indonesia, a general obligation upon the Muslim community. On 8 October, the PKI head office was ransacked and burned to the ground while firefighters stood by idly. They then marched demanding the dissolution of the Communist Party. The homes of senior party figures, including PKI chairman D. N. Aidit, M. H. Lukman and Nyoto were also torched. The army led an armed forces campaign to purge Indonesian society, government, the armed forces and law enforcement of the influence and power of the communist party and other leftist organisations allied to it (but not the Murba Party that was against the PKI and had been banned by the government because of its opposition to it). Leading PKI members were immediately arrested, some summarily executed.

On 18 October, a declaration was read over armed forces-controlled radio stations, banning the PKI and organizations affiated to the party. The ban included the party itself, and its youth and women's wings, peasant associations, intellectual and student groups, and the SOBSI trade union. At the time, it was not clear whether this ban applied only to Jakarta (by then controlled by the Army), or the whole Republic of Indonesia. However, the ban was soon used as a pretext for the Indonesian Army to go throughout the country carrying out extrajudicial punishments, including mass arrest and summary executions, against Sukarno loyalists and suspected leftists linked to the PKI and its allied organizations. As the violence spread, Sukarno issued orders to try to stop it, but he was ignored. He also refused to blame the PKI for the coup, let alone ban it as the Army demanded. However, although Suharto and Nasution were increasingly suspicious about Sukarno's role in the affair, the Army was reluctant to confront the president directly because of his still widespread popularity.

Beginning in later October 1965, and feeding off pent-up communal hatreds, the Indonesian Army and its civilian allies (especially Muslim vigilante groups) began to kill actual and suspected members and associates of the PKI and members of party affiliated organizations. The US government covertly supported the massacres, providing extensive lists of suspected communists to be targeted. The killings started in the capital Jakarta, spread to Central and East Java, and later Bali. Although killings occurred across Indonesia, the worst were in the provinces of Central Java, East Java, Bali, and North Sumatra - all PKI-loyal provinces. The massacres reached their peak over the remainder of the year before subsiding in the early months of 1966. The estimates of the death toll of the violence range from over 100,000 to three million, but most scholars accept a figure of around 500,000. Many others were also imprisoned, and for the next ten years, people were still being imprisoned as suspects. It is thought that as many as 1.5m were imprisoned at one stage or another. As a result of the purge, one of Sukarno's three pillars of support, the PKI, had been effectively eliminated by the other two, the armed forces and political Islam, helped in Bali by proponents of the Balinese caste system who saw the PKI and its allies as a threat to their way of life.

=== Demonstrations ===
Three People's Demands Tri Tuntutan Rakyat
- Part of the Transition to the New Order
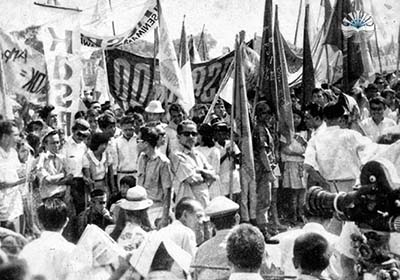
- KAMI, KAPPI mass demonstration, 1966
- Date: January–March 1966
- Location: Jakarta, Indonesia
- Caused by: Authoritarianism of Sukarno; 1963–1965 Indonesian hyperinflation; PKI failed coup attempt
- Goals: Banning of the Communist Party; Dissolution of the Dwikora Cabinet; Lower food prices demand
- Methods: Political demonstration

Parties
Indonesian government: Dwikora Cabinet	KAMI; KAPPI

Lead figures
Sukarno	No centralized leadership

In October 1965, students in Jakarta formed KAMI (Kesatuan Aksi Mahasiswa Indonesia, Indonesian Students Action Front), which called for the banning of the PKI. It was soon joined by a host of similar organisations made up of high school students, workers, artists and labourers and the like. Other targets for the demonstrators were rising prices and government inefficiency. They also demonstrated against Subandrio, the foreign minister and head of the BPI intelligence agency and the number two man in the government.

On 10 January 1966, demonstrators, including KAMI, demonstrated in front of the Provisional legislature and announced what became known as the Three Demands of the People (Tritura):

- Dissolution of the PKI
- The expulsion from the cabinet of G30S/PKI elements
- Lower prices and economic improvements

In February 1966, as anti-communist demonstrations continued, Sukarno tried to placate Suharto by promoting him. On 21 February, he tried to regain the initiative by announcing a new cabinet - the Revised Dwikora Cabinet, which included former Air Force chief AVM Omar Dani, who had issued a statement on 1 October 1965 initially supporting the coup. More provocatively still, Sukarno fired General Nasution as Minister of Defense and was replaced by MG Sarbini, while Suharto remained as Chief of Staff of the Army and a member of the cabinet. The new cabinet immediately became known as the Gestapu cabinet, after the acronym coined by the military for the 30 September Movement.

Two days after the announcement, a huge crowd attempted to storm the presidential palace. The next day, while the new cabinet was being inaugurated, soldiers from the presidential guard opened fire on a crowd in front of the palace, killing student protester Arif Rachman Hakim, who was turned into a martyr and given a hero's funeral the following day.

On 8 March 1966, students managed to ransack the foreign ministry building and held it for five hours. They daubed slogans, one accusing Subandrio of murdering the generals and drew graffiti showing him as a Pekingese dog (a reference to his perceived closeness to communist China) or hanging from gallows.

Sukarno then planned a three-day series of meetings to restore his authority. The first, on 10 March, involved the leaders of political parties. He managed to persuade them to sign a declaration warning against the undermining of presidential authority by student demonstrations. The second stage was a cabinet meeting planned for 11 March. However, as this meeting was underway, word reached Sukarno that unidentified troops were surrounding the palace. Sukarno left the palace in haste for Bogor, where later that night, he signed the Supersemar document transferring authority to restore order to Major General Suharto. Suharto acted quickly. On 12 March, he ordered a nationwide ban on the PKI and its member and affiliate organizations, as well as all party activities. The same day, there was a "show of force" by the Army in the streets of Jakarta, which was watched by cheering crowds. On 18 March, Subandrio and 14 other ministers were arrested, including the third deputy prime minister Chairul Saleh. That night, the radio announced that the ministers were in "protective custody".

Suharto later admitted in his autobiography that he frequently liaised with the student protesters throughout this period and that Sukarno often pleaded with him to stop the demonstrations.

== Political maneuvering ==
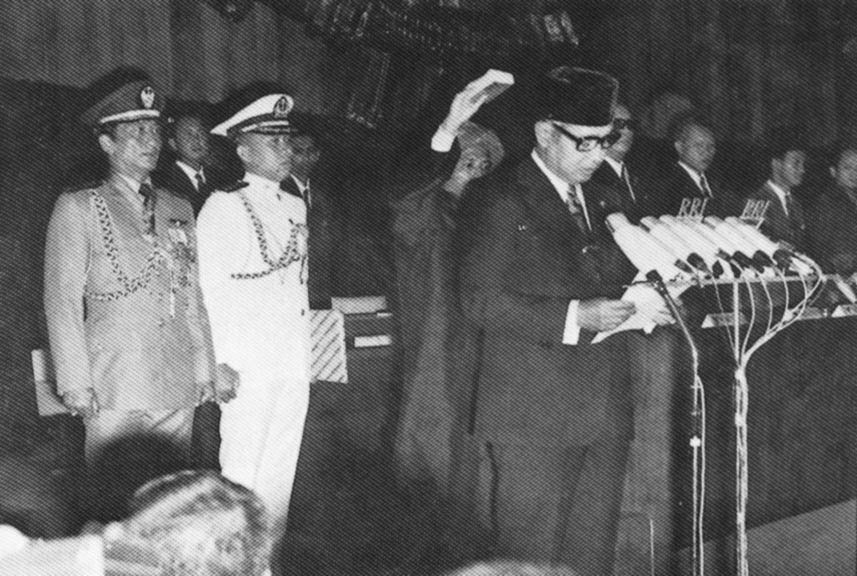
General Suharto is sworn in as Indonesia's second president on 27 March 1968 (Photo by the Department of Information, Indonesia)

On 27 March, the new cabinet line-up, agreed between Suharto and Sukarno, was announced. The Second Revised Dwikora Cabinet included the key figures of Suharto himself as interim deputy prime minister for defense and security and thus Minister of Defense and Commander of the Armed Forces concurrently, tasked with preventing the resurgence of communism, the Sultan of Yogyakarta Sri Sultan Hamengkubuwono IX as deputy prime minister for economic, financial and development affairs, tasked with solving the nation's economic problems and Adam Malik as deputy prime minister for social and political affairs, whose job it would be to manage foreign policy.

On 24 April 1966, Suharto gave a speech to members of the Indonesian National Party in which he spoke of the "three deviations" that would have to be corrected by the youth of the country in co-operation with the Armed Forces. These were:

- The extreme-left radicalism of the PKI and its efforts to impose a class struggle on the Indonesian people;
- Political opportunism motivated by personal gain led and exploited by the "puppet masters" of the Indonesian Central Intelligence Board (BPI), at the time led by Sukarno ally Subandrio;
- Economic adventurism, resulting in the deliberate creation of economic chaos.

The new cabinet, in defiance of Sukarno's wishes, began moves to end the Indonesia-Malaysia confrontation and began to pull Indonesia away from China in retaliation for its backing of the Communists and konfrontasi.

Meanwhile, Suharto and his allies continued to purge state institutions of Sukarno loyalists. The now disbanded Tjakrabirawa Regiment was replaced by an Army military police regiment, and following further student demonstrations in front of the legislature building on 2 May, the leadership of the Mutual Cooperation People's Representative Council (DPR-GR) led by Speaker I Gusti Gde Subamia was replaced and Sukarnoist and pro-communist members were stripped of their MP titles from the DPR-GR and the Provisional People's Consultative Assembly (MPRS), the supreme lawmaking body and expelled. Pro-Suharto MPs for both bodies were appointed led by MPRS ad-interim speaker Wiluyo Puspoyudo.

A session of the MPRS was scheduled to open 12 May, but eventually began on 20 June and continued until 5 July. One of its first actions was to appoint General Abdul Haris Nasution as speaker with Achmad Sjaichu serving as speaker of the DPR-GR. It then set about dismantling the apparatus Sukarno had built around himself. It passed several decrees, one of which was the ratification of the Supersemar, thus making revocation of it almost impossible. It also ratified the banning of the PKI and the teaching of Marxist ideology, instructed Suharto to form a new cabinet, called on Sukarno to explain the economic and political situation in the nation and stripped him of the title "president for life". It also passed a decree stating that if the president were unable to carry out his duties, the holder of the Supersemar would assume the presidency. Suharto did not seek Sukarno's outright removal at this MPRS session due to the remaining support for the president amongst elements of the armed forces (particularly the Marines, the navy, and some regional army divisions).

The new cabinet, announced by Sukarno on 20 June, the Ampera Cabinet, was led by a five-person presidium headed by Suharto as de facto prime minister, and including Malik and Sri Sultan Hamengkubuwono IX as deputies. Suharto remained minister of defense and chief of the Army.

On 11 August, against the wishes of Sukarno, a peace treaty was signed, formally ending Konfrontasi. Indonesia announced it would rejoin the World Bank, the International Monetary Fund and the United Nations. It released political prisoners and paid compensation to the British and American governments for the damage caused to their diplomatic buildings during the demonstrations of the Sukarno era.

On 17 August, in his annual independence day speech, Sukarno claimed that Indonesia was not about to recognise Malaysia nor rejoin the UN. He also stated that he had not transferred power to Suharto. This provoked an angry reaction in the form of demonstrations, and Indonesia did indeed rejoin the UN in September, participating in the General Assembly on 28 September. Meanwhile, criticism from demonstrators became increasingly vociferous and personal, and there were calls for him to be put on trial in front of the Special Military Court (Mahmilub).

On 22 June 1966, Sukarno delivered a speech known as Nawaksara (Nine Points) in front of the MPRS, where he seemed to give an account of his appointment as president for life, his plan of work as president, and how the Constitution worked in practice. Nothing about the G30S was mentioned. The MPRS would refuse to ratify this speech and ordered Sukarno to give additional account on the G30S. On 10 January 1967, Sukarno wrote to the MPRS, enclosing a document of the addendum of Nawaksara (Pelengkap Nawaksara) giving his version of the events surrounding the 30 September Movement. In it, he said the kidnappings and murders of the generals had been a "complete surprise" to him, and that he alone was not responsible for the nation's moral and economic problems. He also described the role of the PKI and the alleged roles of the neo-colonialist and neo-imperialist and other unwanted elements surrounding the G30S crisis. This led to demonstrators calling for Sukarno to be hanged.

April 1967 ABC report of the political tensions at end of the Sukarno era

The MPRS leadership met on 21 January and concluded that Sukarno had failed to fulfil his constitutional obligations. In a resolution passed on 9 February, the DPR-GR rejected the Nawaksara and asked the MPRS to convene a special session. On 20 February 1967, Sukarno reluctantly handed over executive powers to Suharto and later vacated his presidential palaces in Jakarta.

On 12 March 1967, the special session began. After heated debates, MPRS agreed to strip Sukarno of his power and later appointed Suharto as the acting president. Sukarno went into de facto house arrest in Bogor. A year later, on 27 March 1968, another session of the MPRS appointed Suharto the second president of Indonesia.

General Nasution was believed to have launched his own bid for power on 16 December 1965, when he won appointment to the Supreme Operations Command and gained a grip over the traditionally civilian-held portion of the military hierarchy. It was reported that Nasution would have preferred forming a military junta to replace Sukarno (The New York Times, 16 December 1965).

== Consequences ==
=== Anti-Chinese laws ===
While resentment toward Chinese Indonesians by indigenous Indonesian-descended peoples of the archipelago dated back to the Dutch East Indies era, the New Order instigated anti-Chinese legislation following the quashing of the Communists. Stereotypes of the Chinese as disproportionately affluent and greedy were common throughout the time (both in Indonesia as well as Malaysia), but with the anti-communist hysteria, the association of the Chinese Indonesians with the People's Republic of China caused them also to be viewed as a communist fifth column.

Indonesia's hitherto friendly diplomatic relations with mainland China were severed, and the Chinese Embassy in Jakarta burnt down by a mob. New legislation included the banning of Chinese language signs on shops and other buildings, and the closure of Chinese language schools, adoption of "Indonesian" sounding names, and limits on Buddhist temple construction.

=== New political system ===
The liquidation and banning of the Communist Party (and related organisations) eliminated one of the largest political parties in Indonesia. It was also among the largest Communist Parties in the Comintern, at an estimated three million members. Along with the subsequent efforts by Suharto to wrest power from Sukarno by purging loyalists from the parliament, the civilian government in Indonesia was effectively put to an end by the coup countermeasures.

Strident anti-communism remained a hallmark of the 31-year regime.

The new regime that emerged from the upheavals of the 1960s was dedicated to maintaining political order, promoting economic development, and excluding mass participation from the political process. The military was given a substantial role in politics, political and social organisations throughout the country were bureaucratised and corporatized, and selective but effective and sometimes brutal repression was used against opponents of the regime.

Some seats in the parliament were set-aside for the military as part of the dwifungsi (dual function) doctrine. Under the system, the military took on roles as administrators at all levels of government. The political parties not banned outright were consolidated into a single party, the Party of the Functional Groups (Indonesian: Partai Golongan Karya), more commonly known as Golkar. Though Suharto would allow for the formation of two non-Golkar parties, these were kept weak during his regime.

=== Rise of Islamism ===
The purging of two secularist parties, the Nationalists and the Communists, had a notable side effect of giving more space for the development of Islamism in Indonesia. This included liberal, conservative, and extremist groups practising Islam in Indonesia.

=== Improved ties with the West ===
The change in regime brought a shift in policy that allowed USAID and other relief agencies to operate within the country. Suharto would open Indonesia's economy by divesting state-owned companies, and Western countries, in particular, were encouraged to invest and take control of many of the mining and construction interests in Indonesia. The result was stabilisation of the economy and the alleviation of absolute poverty and famine conditions that had resulted from shortfalls in the rice supply and Sukarno's refusal to take Western aid.

As a result of his elimination of the communists, Suharto would come to be seen as a pro-Western and anti-Communist. Ongoing military and diplomatic relationships between Indonesia and the Western powers were cemented, leading to US, British, and Australian arms sales and training of military personnel.

=== United States assistance to Suharto ===
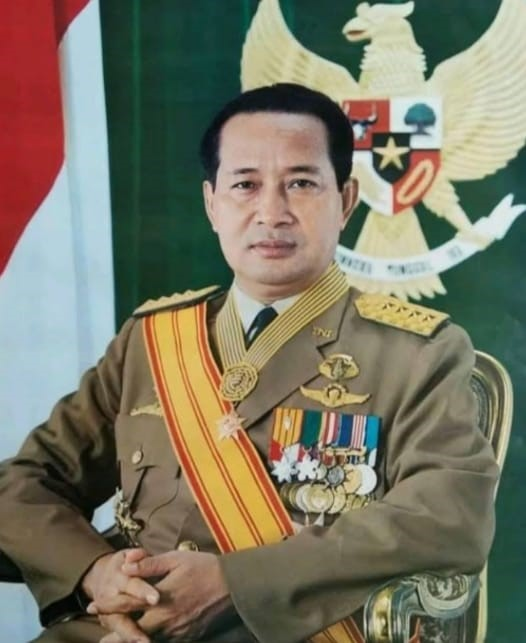
General Suharto

Some experts assert that the United States directly facilitated and encouraged the mass murder of hundreds of thousands of suspected Communists in Indonesia during the mid-1960s. Bradley Simpson, Director of the Indonesia/East Timor Documentation Project at the National Security Archive, says "Washington did everything in its power to encourage and facilitate the army-led massacre of alleged PKI members, and U.S. officials worried only that the killing of the party's unarmed supporters might not go far enough, permitting Sukarno to return to power and frustrate the [Johnson] Administration's emerging plans for a post-Sukarno Indonesia." According to Simpson, the terror in Indonesia was an "essential building block of the quasi neo-liberal policies the West would attempt to impose on Indonesia in the years to come". Historian John Roosa, commenting on documents released from the US embassy in Jakarta in 2017, says they confirm that "the US was part and parcel of the operation, strategising with the Indonesian army and encouraging them to go after the PKI." Geoffrey B. Robinson, a historian at UCLA, argues that without the support of the U.S. and other powerful Western states, the Indonesian Army's program of mass killings would not have happened. Vincent Bevins writes in his book The Jakarta Method that "The United States was part and parcel of the operation at every stage, starting well before the killing started, until the last body dropped and the last political prisoner emerged from jail, decades later, tortured, scarred, and bewildered." Ruth J. Blakeley, Professor of Politics and International Relations at the University of Sheffield, says the case of Indonesia demonstrates the extent to which the United States put the interests of Western capitalist elites over the human rights of hundreds of thousands of Indonesians by supporting the Indonesian Army as it waged "an extensive campaign of state terrorism."

As early as 1958, the U.S. and its allies backed anti-communist elements within the Indonesian Army with secret assurances, financial and military support, and this support solidified once the mass killing campaigns were underway, demonstrating the "resolve" of the army. During the height of the violence, U.S. embassy official Robert J. Martens provided lists containing roughly 5,000 names of high ranking PKI members to the Indonesian Army, which, according to Robinson, "almost certainly aided in the death or detention of many innocent people". He notes that providing these kill lists "sent a powerful message that the US government agreed with and supported the army's campaign against the PKI, even as that campaign took its terrible toll in human lives."
