= Inauguration of Abdurrahman Wahid =

Presidential inauguration of Abdurrahman Wahid
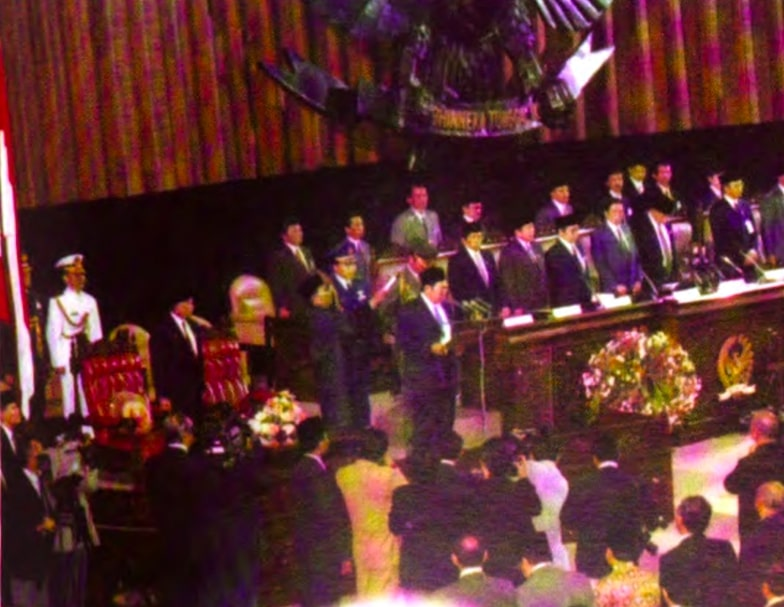
- President Abdurrahman Wahid taking his presidential oath in 1999
- Date: 20 October 1999; 26 years ago
- Location: Parliamentary Complex, Jakarta
- Organized by: People's Consultative Assembly
- Participants: Abdurrahman Wahid 4th president of Indonesia; — Assuming office: B.J. Habibie 3rd president of Indonesia; — Leaving office

The inauguration of Abdurrahman Wahid as the 4th president of Indonesia took place on Wednesday, 20 October 1999 at the Parliamentary Complex, Jakarta. The ceremony marked the commencement of Wahid's only term as president.

Wahid's term as president only lasted for one year, nine months, and four days, (Note: 20 October 1999 – 23 July 2001.) his term ended following his decree to suspend the People's Consultative Assembly and the People's Representative Council on July 23, 2001.

== Background ==
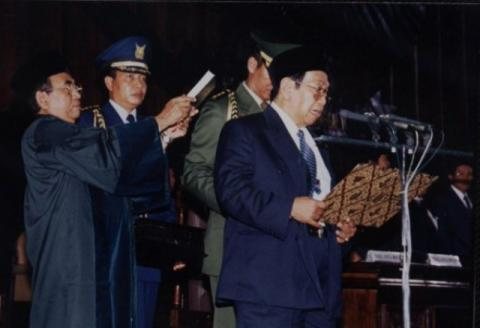
Abdurrahman Wahid reading the presidential oath during the inauguration process

In 1999 Wahid was elected as president beating Megawati Sukarnoputri by 373 votes to 313, he was the first candidate to win the presidency through a vote by the People’s Consultative Assembly. The following day, Megawati was nominated by Gus Dur's party as vice president and got elected, beating Hamzah Haz from the PPP by 396 votes to 284.

== See also ==
- First inauguration of Suharto
- Inauguration of B. J. Habibie
