= 1999 Indonesian presidential election =

- 20–21 October 1999
- Presidential election
- 20 October 1999

700 members of the People's Consultative Assembly 351 electoral votes needed to win
- Turnout: 98.71% (▲5.64pp)
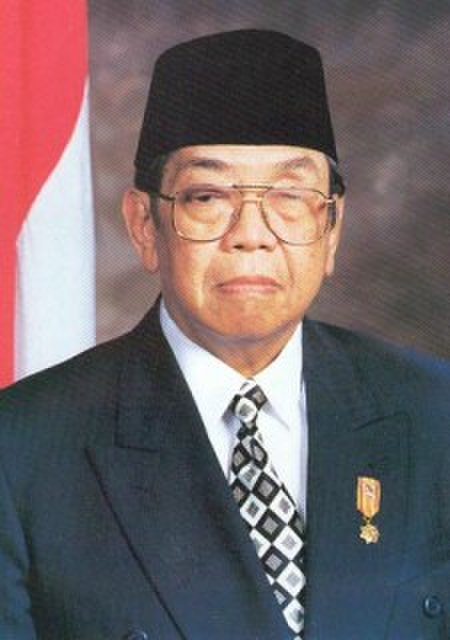

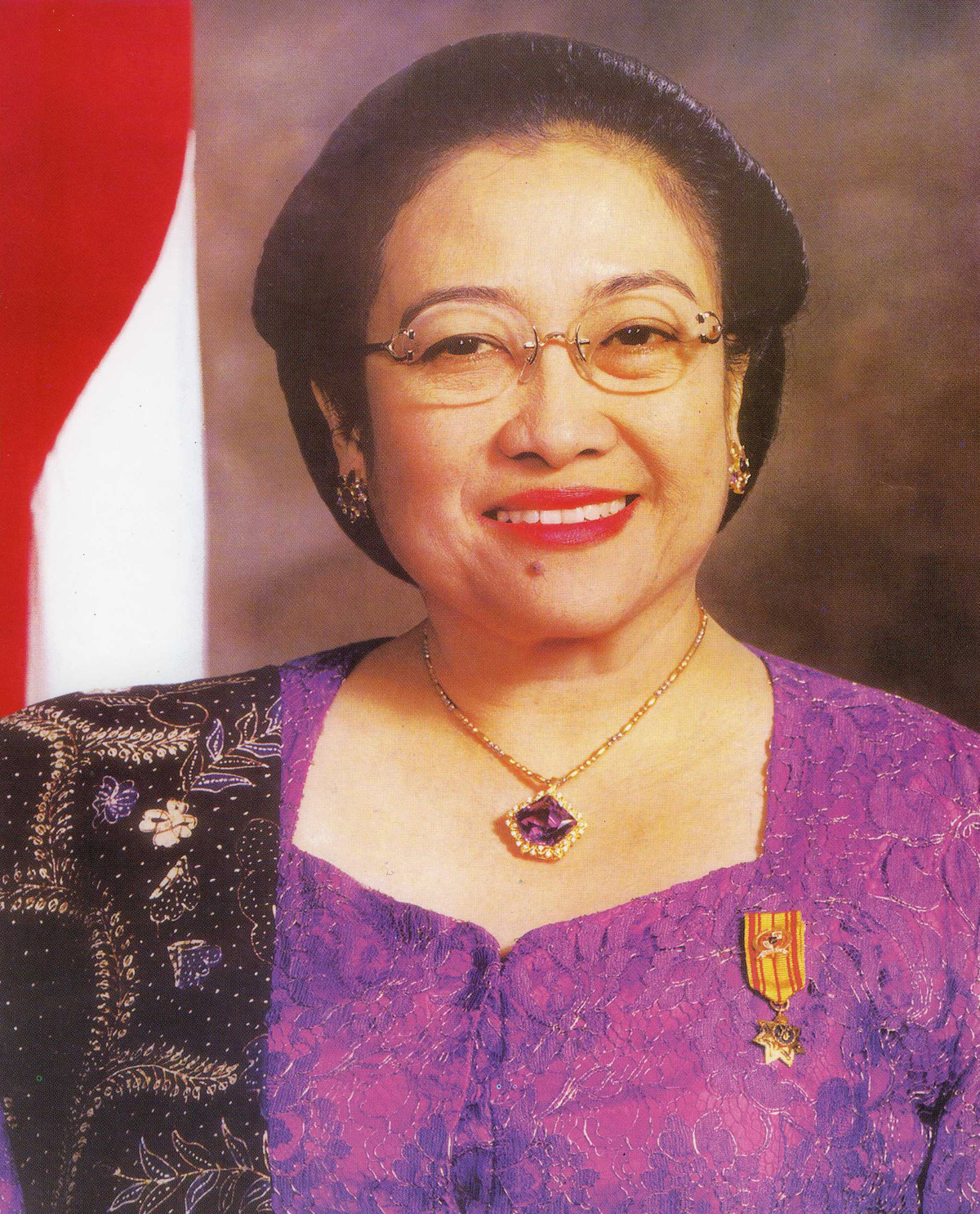
Nominee	Abdurrahman Wahid	Megawati Sukarnoputri
Party	PKB	PDI-P
Alliance	Central Axis (Note: Including PKB, the National Mandate Party, the United Development Party the Justice Party and the Crescent Star Party)
Electoral vote	373	313
Percentage	54.37%	45.63%
- Votes of the People's Consultative Assembly Abdurrahman Wahid: 373 votes Megawati Sukarnoputri: 313 votes Invalid votes: 5 Abstentions: 9
President before election
B. J. Habibie
Golkar
Elected President
Abdurrahman Wahid
PKB
- Vice-presidential election
- 21 October 1999

700 members of the People's Consultative Assembly 351 electoral votes needed to win
- Turnout: 97.86% (▼2.14pp)
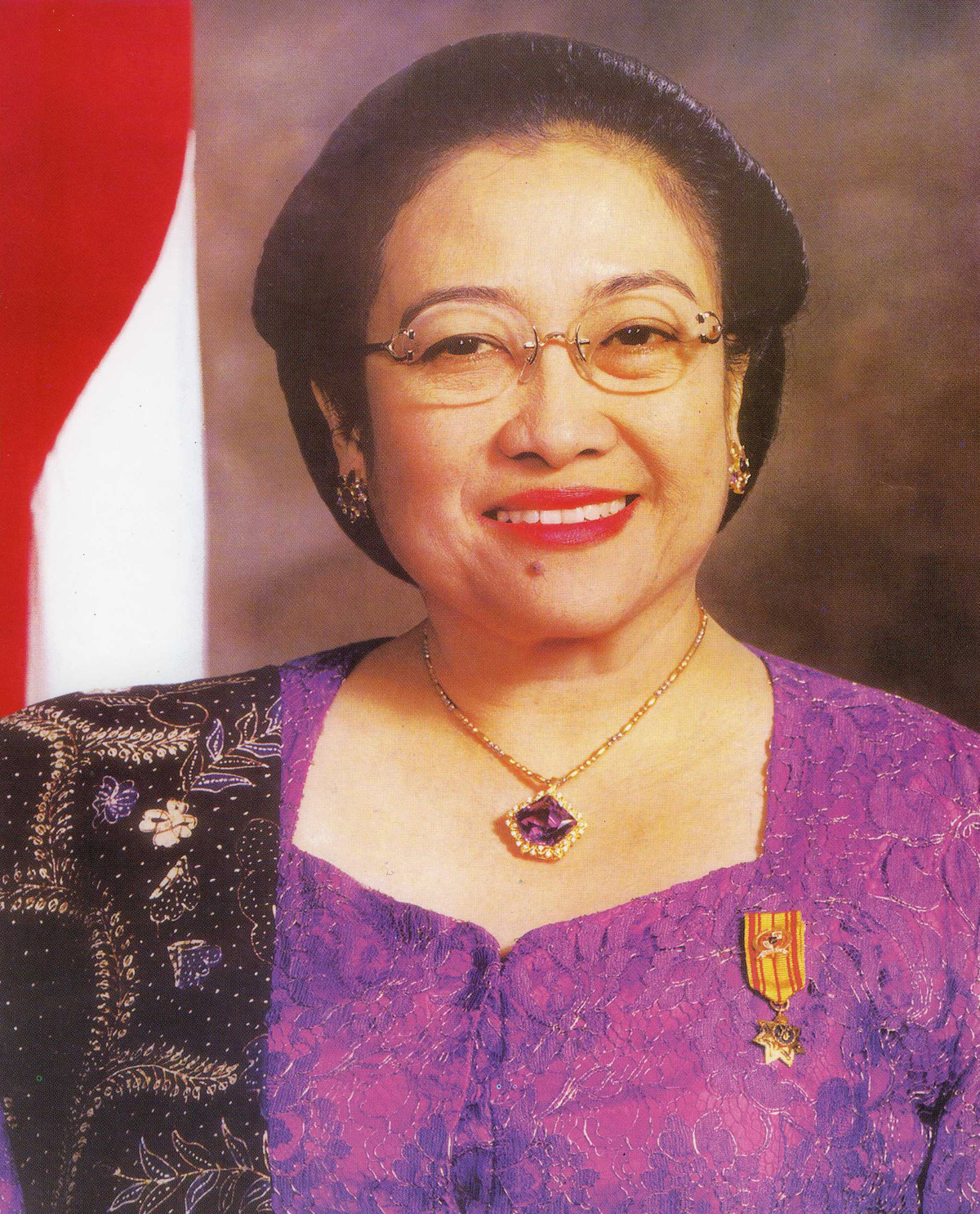

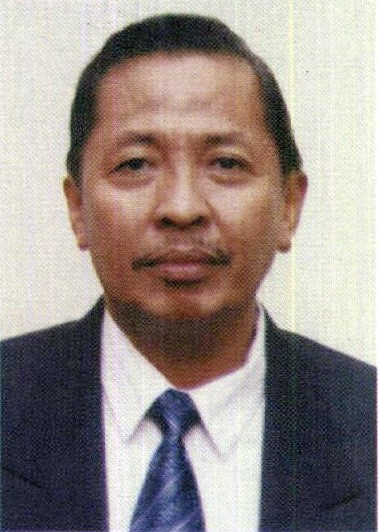
Nominee	Megawati Sukarnoputri	Hamzah Haz
Party	PDI-P	PPP
Electoral vote	396	284
Percentage	58.24%	41.76%
- Votes of the People's Consultative Assembly Megawati Sukarnoputri: 396 votes Hamzah Haz: 284 votes Invalid votes: 5 Abstentions: 15
Vice President before election
Vacant
Elected Vice President
Megawati Sukarnoputri
PDI-P

From 20 to 21 October 1999, the People's Consultative Assembly (MPR), the legislative branch of Indonesia, met to elect both the president and vice president of the country for the 1999–2004 term. The incumbent president, B. J. Habibie, had ascended after the resignation of longtime president Suharto in 1998, but declined to stand for a full term after his accountability speech was voted down. On 20 October, Abdurrahman Wahid, chairman of the Nahdlatul Ulama, was elected president and inaugurated on the same day. Wahid's opponent, Megawati Sukarnoputri was subsequently elected vice president the next day. The elections represented the first relatively democratic and peaceful transfer of power in the history of Indonesia. It was also the first presidential election decided by counting of votes.

== Background ==
In October, the People's Consultative Assembly made up of the People's Representative Council and 200 nominated members from the military and selected civilians, a total of 700, met to elect the president and vice president.

There were initially four candidates for the presidency; Abdurrahman Wahid, B. J. Habibie, Megawati Sukarnoputri, and Yusril Ihza Mahendra. However, Habibie refused the nomination from Golkar after his accountability speech was rejected by the MPR the day before election, while Yusril withdrew his candidacy on election day.

== Election day ==
On 20 October, PKB chairman Abdurrahman Wahid was elected, beating Megawati Sukarnoputri by 373 votes to 313, although her party (PDI-P) won the most votes in the legislative election and had one-third of the parliamentary seats. This triggered riots among Megawati's supporters. The following day, Megawati was nominated by Gus Dur's party (PKB) as vice president and got elected, beating Hamzah Haz from the PPP by 396 votes to 284. This ended the street protests.

This was the first and only democratically indirect presidential election in Indonesia and the first presidential election that did not feature a candidate from the ruling party (Golkar).

== Results ==
=== President ===
Candidate	Party	Votes	%
Abdurrahman Wahid	National Awakening Party	373	54.37
Megawati Sukarnoputri	Indonesian Democratic Party of Struggle	313	45.63
Total		686	100.00
Valid votes		686	99.28
Invalid/blank votes		5	0.72
Total votes		691	100.00
Registered voters/turnout		700	98.71

=== Vice president ===
Candidate	Party	Votes	%
Megawati Sukarnoputri	Indonesian Democratic Party of Struggle	396	58.24
Hamzah Haz	United Development Party	284	41.76
Total		680	100.00
Valid votes		680	99.27
Invalid/blank votes		5	0.73
Total votes		685	100.00
Registered voters/turnout		700	97.86
