= 1963 Indonesian presidential election =

Indonesian presidential election

← 1945	18 May 1963	1968 →

616 members of the Provisional People's Consultative Assembly Most electoral votes needed to win
- Turnout: 100% ( 0.00pp)
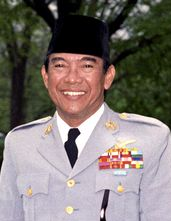
Nominee	Sukarno
Party	Independent
Electoral vote	616
Percentage	100%
- Votes of the Provisional People's Consultative Assembly Sukarno: 616 votes
President before election
Sukarno
Independent
Elected President
Sukarno
Independent

The 1963 Indonesian presidential election was a second vote to elect the President and Vice President of the Republic of Indonesia for the 1963–1968 term. The presidential election was conducted in accordance with the 1945 Constitution. Because the MPR (People's Consultative Assembly) had not yet been formed, its duties were carried out by the MPRS (Provisional People's Consultative Assembly).

== Background ==
Actually, the second presidential election was intended to be held after Indonesia's independence. However, this was not possible because of the Indonesian National Revolution throughout the 1950s, so that (the Legislative Election and the Presidential-Vice Presidential Election) were temporarily postponed. In addition, due to the change of the 1945 Constitution to the Provisional Constitution of 1950 (which was used from 1950 to 1959), the presidential election could not be held because the president at that time was only the holder of state power, not also the holder of government.

However, this changed since the Presidential Decree 1959, namely the return of the 1945 Constitution as the State Constitution, and the MPRS as the temporary holder of the duties of the MPR-RI.

Sukarno was finally proposed to be nominated at the MPRS General Session dated 15–22 May 1963. Many of Soekarno's supporters proposed Sukarno's nomination as president for life. This proposal was also supported by AM Hanafi, Chaerul Saleh, and voiced to the MPRS by Colonel Suhardirman, one of the ABRI members in the MPRS who also proposed the idea.

Finally, a presidential election was held. Because Sukarno was also elected, this idea was unanimously approved because Sukarno won the presidential election for the 1963–1968 term. Therefore, his term of office was changed to life. Sukarno was officially made President for Life through the session.

== Results ==
=== President ===
Candidate	Party	Votes	%
Sukarno	Independent	616	100.00
Total		616	100.00
Valid votes		616	100.00
Invalid/blank votes		0	0.00
Total votes		616	100.00
Registered voters/turnout		616	100.00
