= List of Indonesian presidential candidates by number of votes received =

Following is a list of Indonesian presidential candidates by number of votes received. Presidential elections through direct voting began in the 2004 Indonesian presidential election, with prior presidents being voted for by the People's Consultative Assembly. Each election has seen an increasing number of total voters due to natural population growth. The parties indicated in the table is the party of the presidential candidate, but generally presidential tickets are backed by a coalition of multiple political parties.

== List ==
Candidate	Year	Running mate	Party	Popular vote	Notes
Prabowo Subianto	2024	Gibran Rakabuming Raka	Gerindra	96,214,691	Winner
Joko Widodo	2019	Ma'ruf Amin	PDI-P	85,607,362	Winner
Susilo Bambang Yudhoyono	2009	Boediono	Demokrat	73,874,562	Winner
Joko Widodo	2014	Jusuf Kalla	PDI-P	70,997,833	Winner
Susilo Bambang Yudhoyono	2004	Jusuf Kalla	Demokrat	69,266,350	Winner, runoff voting
Prabowo Subianto	2019	Sandiaga Uno	Gerindra	68,650,239	Second place
Prabowo Subianto	2014	Hatta Rajasa	Gerindra	62,576,444	Second place
Megawati Sukarnoputri	2004	Hasyim Muzadi	PDI-P	44,990,704	Second place, Runoff voting
Anies Baswedan	2024	Muhaimin Iskandar	Independent	40,971,906	Second place
Susilo Bambang Yudhoyono	2004	Jusuf Kalla	Demokrat	39,838,184	First place, first round (proceeded to runoff)
Megawati Sukarnoputri	2009	Prabowo Subianto	PDI-P	32,548,105	Second place
Megawati Sukarnoputri	2004	Hasyim Muzadi	PDI-P	31,569,104	Second place, first round (proceeded to runoff)
Ganjar Pranowo	2024	Mahfud MD	PDI-P	27,040,878	Third place
Wiranto	2004	Salahuddin Wahid	Golkar	26,286,788	Third place, Eliminated in first round
Amien Rais	2004	Siswono Yudo Husodo	PAN	17,392,931	Fourth place, Eliminated in first round
Jusuf Kalla	2009	Wiranto	Golkar	15,081,814	Third place
Hamzah Haz	2004	Agum Gumelar	PPP	3,569,861	Fifth place, Eliminated in first round
