= First inauguration of Suharto =

Swearing in of Indonesian president

First presidential inauguration of Suharto
- Part of the Transition to the New Order
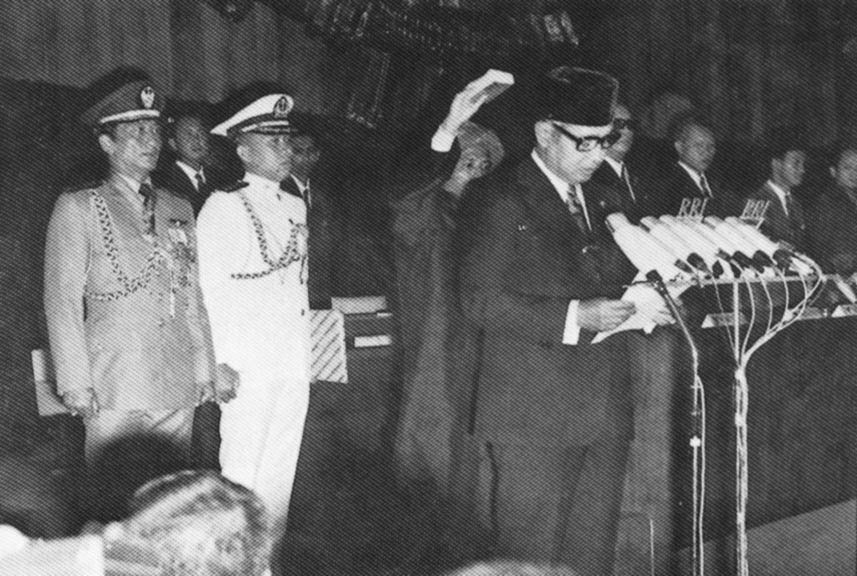
- President Suharto taking his presidential oath of office in 1968
- Date: 27 March 1968; 58 years ago
- Location: Parliamentary Complex, Jakarta
- Organized by: People's Consultative Assembly
- Participants: Suharto 2nd president of Indonesia; — Assuming office

The first inauguration of Suharto as the 2nd president of Indonesia took place on 27 March 1968. Suharto was officially sworn in by the Provisional MPR (MPRS) after a year of acting presidency, marking the formal beginning of the first of his six five-year terms as president.

== Background ==
Following the 30 September Movement event General Suharto assumed presidential powers to "restore" law and order which led to anti-communist purge. By February 1967, President Sukarno realized that his political career was at an end and he became concerned at cutting his losses. On 7 February, he sent a letter to Suharto saying that he was willing to hand over the running of the government to the General but also added that he would like to continue on as head of state. On 20 February 1967, Sukarno chose to relinquish all executive power to Suharto whilst still retaining his position as president.

On 12 March 1967, the MPRS agreed to withdraw its mandate from Sukarno and remove him as president. Suharto was appointed acting president to replace Sukarno. He was officially elected by the MPRS on 27 March 1968 to a full five-year term, becoming the second president of Indonesia.

== See also ==
- Inauguration of B. J. Habibie
- Inauguration of Abdurrahman Wahid
