= Second inauguration of Susilo Bambang Yudhoyono =

Inauguration of President-elect Susilo Bambang Yudhoyono

Second presidential inauguration of Susilo Bambang Yudhoyono
- Date: 20 October 2009; 16 years ago
- Location: Parliamentary Complex, Jakarta
- Organized by: People's Consultative Assembly
- Participants: Susilo Bambang Yudhoyono 6th president of Indonesia; Boediono 11th vice president of Indonesia; — Assuming office: Jusuf Kalla 10th vice president of Indonesia; — Leaving office

The second inauguration of Susilo Bambang Yudhoyono (better known by his initials as SBY) as the 6th president of Indonesia took place on Tuesday, 20 October 2009 at the Parliamentary Complex, Jakarta. This event marked the official start of his second term Susilo Bambang Yudhoyono as president and Boediono as vice president of Indonesia. Both were sworn in after winning presidential election.

== Inauguration ceremony ==
The inauguration ceremony started at 10:00 local time (03:00 UTC). It was held on the People's Consultative Assembly parliamentary session led by assembly speaker Taufiq Kiemas.

== Mistake ==
=== Mention of names and titles ===
During the inauguration ceremony, Taufiq Kiemas as chair of the session, incorrectly mentioned the title attached to the president's name Susilo Bambang Yudhoyono. At that time, Taufiq said that his doctoral degree would become a doctor.

Bapak Dokter....eh Doktor Susilo Bambang Yudhoyono,
(in English: Mr. Doctor... eh Doctor Susilo Bambang Yudhoyono,)

Another mistake occurred when Taufik mentioned President SBY's name, which should have been Susilo Bambang Yudhoyono, to become Susilo Doctor.

Terima kasih kepada Presiden Republik Indonesia, Bapak Susilo Doktor.... maaf.... Doktor Haji Susilo Bambang Yudhoyono,
(in English: Thanks to President of Indonesia, Mr. Susilo Doctor.... sorry.... Doctor Haji Susilo Bambang Yudhoyono,)

Apart from that mistake, Taufiq's mistake also occurred when he did not mention the names of Vice President Jusuf Kalla and 3rd president and 7th vice president of Indonesia, B. J. Habibie during the opening speeches for the plenary inauguration of the president and vice president.

== Guests ==
=== Indonesians ===
- Ani Yudhoyono, First Lady of Indonesia
- Bacharuddin Jusuf Habibie, 3rd president of Indonesia and 7th vice president
- Hamzah Haz, 9th vice president of Indonesia

=== Foreign attendees ===
- Kevin Rudd, Prime Minister of Australia
- Hassanal Bolkiah, Sultan of Brunei
- Najib Razak, Prime Minister of Malaysia
- Lee Hsien Loong, Prime Minister of Singapore
- (Timor-Leste) José Ramos-Horta, President of East Timor
- (United States) Lisa P. Jackson, Administrator of the Environmental Protection Agency
- Cameron R. Hume, United States Ambassador to Indonesia
- (United States) David Nathan Merrill, President of the non-profit U.S.-Indonesia Society (USINDO)
