= 1968 Indonesian presidential election =

Indonesian presidential election

- 27 March 1968

616 members of the Provisional People's Consultative Assembly Most electoral votes needed to win
- Turnout: 100% ( 0.00pp)
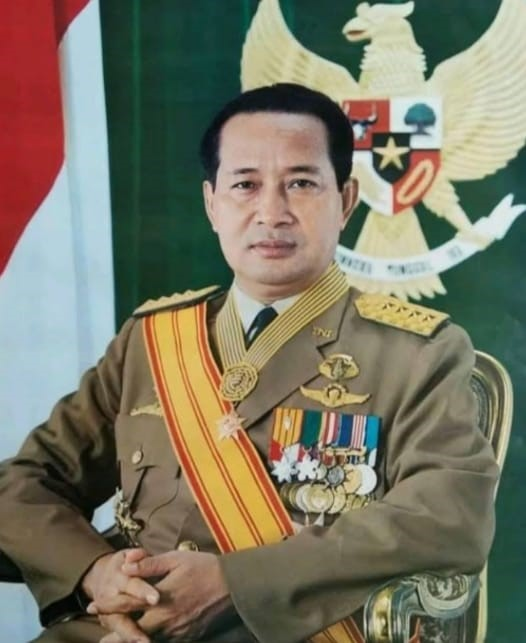
Nominee	Suharto
Party	Golkar
Electoral vote	616
Percentage	100%
- Votes of the Provisional People's Consultative Assembly Suharto: 616 votes
President before election
Suharto (acting)
Military
Elected President
Suharto
Golkar

On 27 March 1968, the Provisional People's Consultative Assembly (MPRS), the legislative branch of Indonesia, met to elect the president of the country for the 1968–1973 term. It was the third presidential election in Indonesia after the 1945 and 1963 elections. Suharto was officially elected president on 27 March 1968 for a five-year term after previously holding the position of acting president since 1967, when Sukarno was officially impeached and removed by the MPRS. Suharto was officially sworn in on the same day, marking the formal beginning of his first five-year term as president.

== Background ==
This presidential election was held because Sukarno was impeached and removed by the Provisional People's Consultative Assembly (MPRS) in 1967. Cabinet changes had been very frequent since the G30S/PKI incident, but Sukarno's presidential mandate was finally revoked in 1967 due to the people's demands (TRITURA, The People's Three Demands). He was replaced by Suharto, who became acting president to secure the condition of Indonesia after the G30S/PKI incident. Sukarno was under house arrest until the end of his life.

== Results ==
=== President ===
Candidate	Party	Votes	%
Suharto	Golkar	616	100.00
Total		616	100.00
Valid votes		616	100.00
Invalid/blank votes		0	0.00
Total votes		616	100.00
Registered voters/turnout		616	100.00
