= Abdurrahman Wahid's 23 July 2001 Decree =

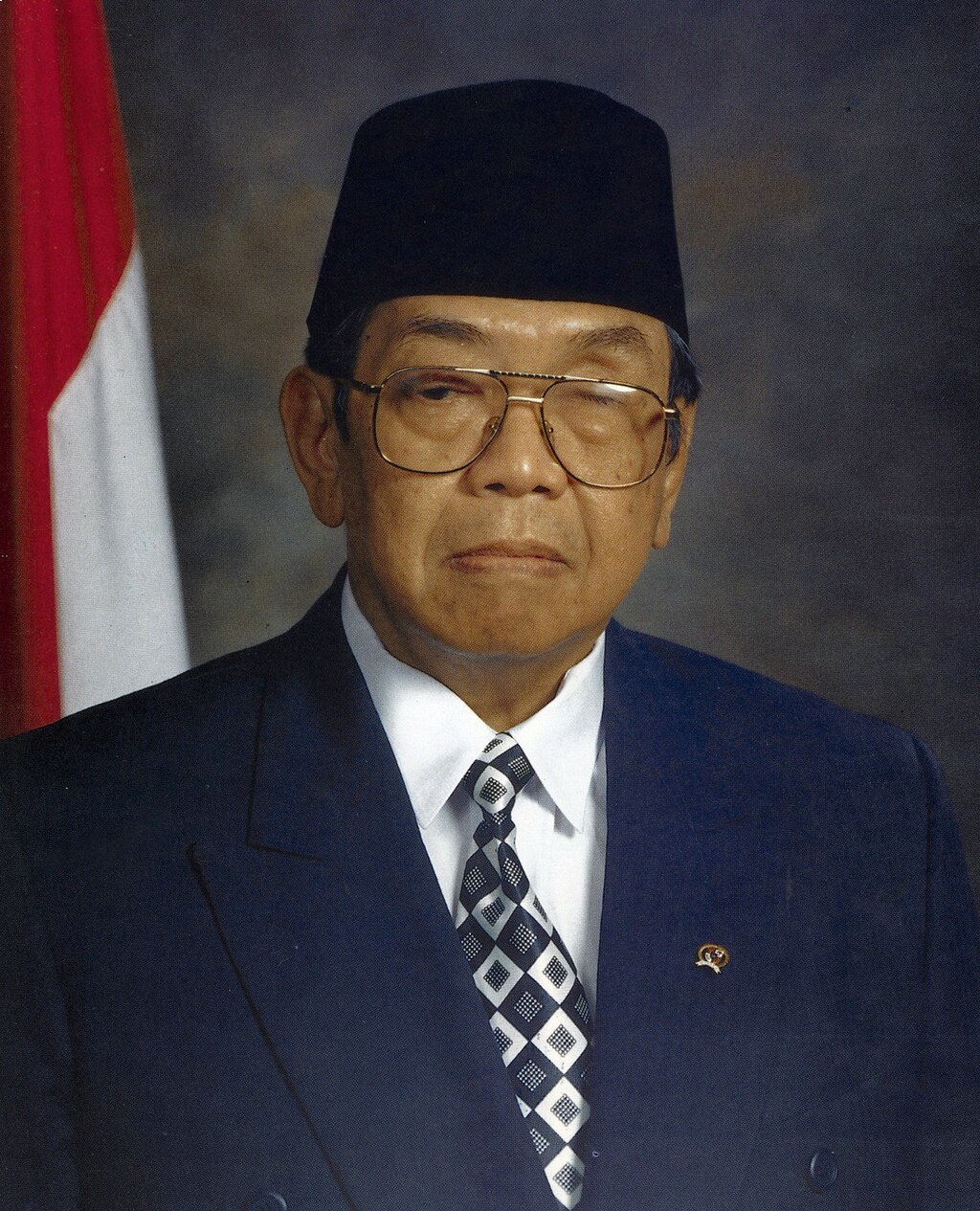
President Abdurrahman Wahid issued a decree in July 2001

The Memorandum of the President of the Republic of Indonesia of 23 July 2001 (Indonesian: Maklumat Presiden Republik Indonesia 23 Juli 2001) was issued by the fourth President of Indonesia, Abdurrahman Wahid, at the climax of his standoff with the People's Consultative Assembly (MPR) and other sections of society, including the Indonesian National Armed Forces (TNI).

The decree ordered the prorogation (Indonesian: pembekuan, lit. 'freezing') of the upper and lower houses of the legislature, the People's Consultative Assembly (MPR) and the People's Representative Council (DPR), a "return of sovereignty to the people" by holding a general election within a year, and the removal of all remnants of the New Order regime by disbanding the Golkar Party.

The legislature retaliated against Wahid's decree and immediately organised a special session of the MPR to impeach Wahid on the very same day. Wahid's position was made more difficult by the refusal of the TNI and Indonesian National Police (Polri) to abide by his decree. The decree saw the downfall of Wahid from the presidency as the impeachment motion was successfully passed by the MPR, and Megawati Sukarnoputri was elected to succeed him as the president on the following day.

== Wahid presidency ==
From the start of his presidency, Wahid's stance and position were at odds with many politicians and members of the public. His conciliatory moves to Israel and further proposals to engage in trade with the country were opposed by strongly pro-Palestinian Indonesian Muslims, who argued that nothing could justify Indonesian relations with Israel.

His relationship with the TNI was equally turbulent. His decision to appoint his ally Agus Wirahadikusumah as commander of the Army Strategic Command (KOSTRAD) in April 2000 was opposed by many in the military top brass. This opposition was mainly caused by his reformist and highly partisan stance, especially after his audit results showed discrepancies in Kostrad's finance management, and further after he personally called for General Wiranto to be sacked from his ministerial post. Under the threat of a wave of resignations of military commanders should Agus remain, Wahid decided to bow to pressure and replaced Agus with Ryamizard Ryacudu.

Wahid's volatile relationship with his cabinet ministers resulted in a total of 18 replacements of ministers in his two-year presidency. Some ministers were sacked simply because of their refusal to cooperate and for showing disobedient traits, while some others were replaced due to more serious allegations of human rights violations (Wiranto) or alleged corruption (Jusuf Kalla and Laksamana Sukardi).

== Declaration ==
On a live television broadcast at 01:10 Western Indonesia Time (UTC+7) in the early morning of 23 July 2001, President Wahid announced the enactment of a decree to address the recent political issues engulfing the country. He claimed to have received substantial support from sections of society to enact the decree, including members of non-governmental organisations and groups of religious scholars.

Wahid opened his declaration by claiming that the recent political issues due to the prolonged constitutional crisis had resulted in further economic crisis and severely hindered his efforts to eradicate corruption. He then declared that an extraordinary action had to be taken in order to prevent the collapse of the country.

The next paragraph was the core of the decree. It consisted of 3 points: suspension of the MPR and DPR, establishment of a body to prepare for an election within one year; and disbandment of the Golkar Party pending a Supreme Court ruling. Wahid further ordered the TNI and Polri to support the enactment of the decree, while asking Indonesian citizens to remain calm and continue their daily activities as usual.

Wahid also cited MPR Speaker Amien Rais' declaration that Indonesia would "soon have a new leadership" after a meeting with political party leaders, which included Wahid's own deputy Megawati Sukarnoputri, as justification for enacting the decree. He wanted the decree to prevent the establishment of a rival government should Amien's manoeuvres be successful.

The wording of the decree was as follows:

DECREE OF THE PRESIDENT OF THE REPUBLIC OF INDONESIA

After carefully observing and considering political developments that are leading to a political impasse as a result of the protracted constitutional crisis that has worsened the economic crisis and obstructed endeavors to uphold the law and eradicate corruption caused by disputes over political authority that no longer pay any regard to the principles of legislation.

If this is not prevented it will shortly destroy the standing of the Unitary State of the Republic of Indonesia, therefore with certainty and responsibility to save the nation and people as well as being based on the wishes of the majority of the Indonesian people, we as head of state of the Republic of Indonesia are forced to take extraordinary measures by proclaiming:

1. The suspension of the People's Consultative Assembly of the Republic of Indonesia and the People's Representative Council of the Republic of Indonesia
2. The return of sovereignty to the people and the taking of measures and establishment of a body as necessary to organize a general election within one year.
3. The saving of the total reform movement from obstructions by elements of the New Order, by suspending the Golkar Party pending a decision by the Supreme Court.

Therefore, we order all ranks of the TNI and National Police to safeguard measures to secure the Unitary State of the Republic of Indonesia and call upon all Indonesian people to remain calm and continue their normal social and economic activities.

May Almighty God bless the nation and people of Indonesia.

Jakarta, 22 July 2001

President of the Republic of Indonesia/Supreme Commander of the Armed Forces

KH Abdurrahman Wahid

== Response ==
The decree caused uproar among MPR and DPR members, who voiced their immediate opposition to it. The MPR, which had previously refrained from bringing forward the MPR special session scheduled for August 2001, decided to hold it immediately due to the urgent need to respond to Wahid's decree. The MPR then voted by 599 to 2 votes to reject the decree.

The TNI and Polri showed their reluctance to support Wahid despite the decree explicitly ordering their support to enforce the decree. Army Chief of Staff Endriartono Sutarto declared that the military would not intervene to block the legislature or act against the opposition. The TNI instead declared its support for the MPR, with its faction in the assembly voting for the special session to take place on 23 July, and later voted to reject the decree.

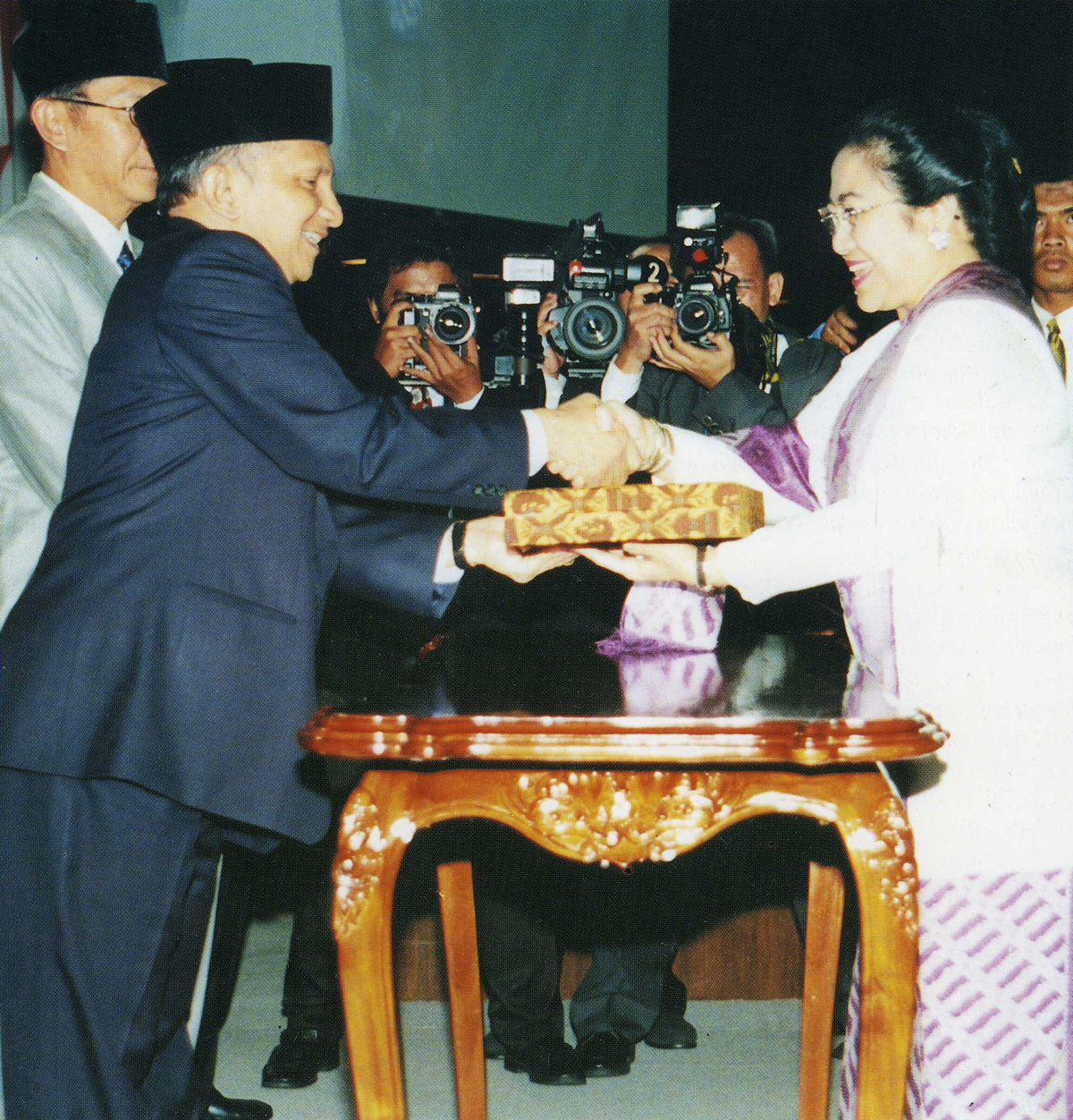
MPR Speaker Amien Rais handed over the MPR decree confirming Megawati Sukarnoputri presidency after the MPR voted Wahid out of office

On the same day, Chief Justice of the Supreme Court Bagir Manan issued a judicial opinion declaring the decree was invalid and had no legal force. Bagir argued that the MPR was supreme over the president and that the president could not overrule the legislature by disbanding it unilaterally. He also argued that the president had no power to disband a political party, as that power was vested solely with the Supreme Court. The judicial opinion was read to MPR members prior to the special session to impeach Wahid. It was criticised as it had been authorised only by a single Supreme Justice, while the proper procedure required the opinion to be authorised by all Supreme Justices.

The MPR officially revoked Wahid's presidential mandate for violating MPR Resolution No. III/MPR/2000 on the order of seniority of law-making bodies after replacing Chief Police Surojo Bimantoro with Chairuddin Ismail without prior consent from the DPR. This was despite two MPR memoranda to Wahid regarding the Bruneigate and Buloggate cases. After Wahid's presidential mandate was revoked, his deputy Megawati Sukarnoputri was elected president, while Hamzah Haz received most votes to become the vice president.

== Aftermath ==
In March 2002, Wahid issued a defence of his decision to issue the decree. He justified it constitutionality, and lamented the fact that the Megawati administration was in no way better than his despite the MPR promised intention that the impeachment was for the good of the country. Despite initial reluctance from Wahid to issue this defence, he later agreed to its publication as he wished to provide future generations with his version of the correct facts about the events of 23 July 2001.

In 2016, several Indonesian political figures including Mahfud MD, Rizal Ramli, and Luhut Binsar Pandjaitan, declared their commitment to reassess Wahid's legacy especially regarding the events around the 23 July 2001 Decree. Luhut argued that Wahid's impeachment was motivated more by political intrigues than by any real intention to address the Buloggate and Bruneigate cases, especially after Wahid was found innocent in a court verdict after the impeachment.
