= Acting presidency of Suharto =

Time of transition to the New Order

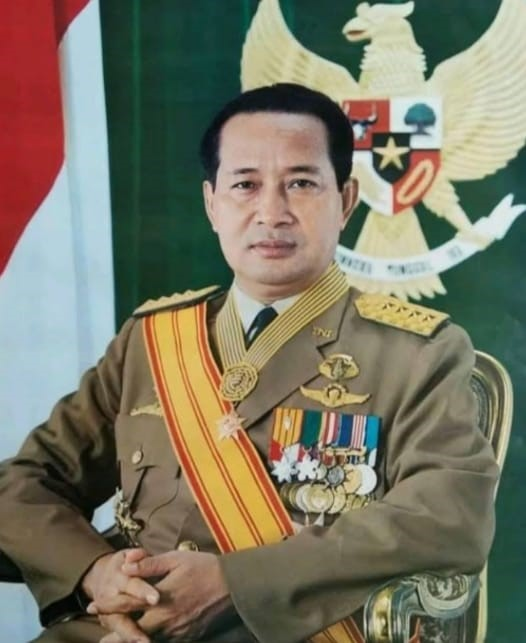
- Acting Presidency of Suharto; 12 March 1967 – 27 March 1968
- President: Suharto
- Cabinet: Revised Ampera Cabinet
- Party: Independent (Military)
- Election: No election
- Seat: Jakarta

The acting presidency of Suharto followed the transition to the New Order in which Army General Suharto assumed presidential powers. The term lasted from 12 March 1967 until 27 March 1968, when Suharto was officially inaugurated as the second president of Indonesia.

== Appointment to the acting presidency ==
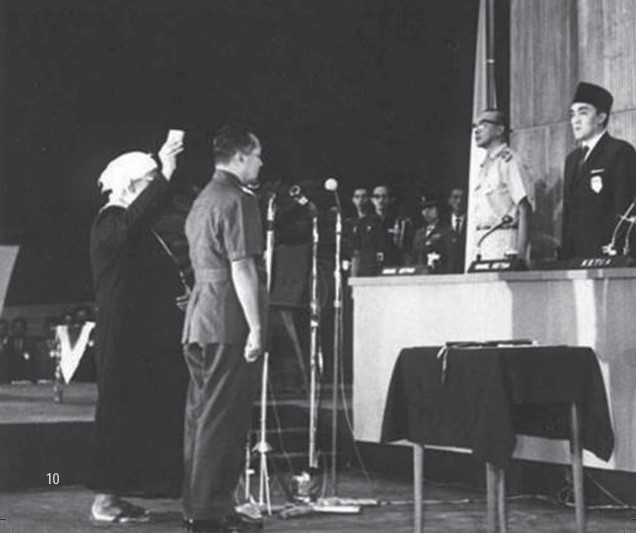
General Suharto's inauguration and oath-taking as acting president

By February 1967, President Sukarno, realizing that his political career was at an end, became concerned at cutting his losses. On 7 February, he sent a letter to Suharto saying that he was willing to hand over the running of the government to the general but also added that he would like to continue on as head of state. In the time between the arrival of that letter and the formulation of the reply, the People's Representative Council (DPR) passed a resolution which called for a special session of the Provisional People's Consultative Assembly (MPRS). Suharto, accompanied by the commanders of the navy, air force, and police, met with Sukarno on 11 February to reject his offer and to wait instead for the result of the MPRS special session.

On 20 February 1967, Sukarno chose to relinquish all executive power to Suharto whilst still retaining his position as president. Sukarno's decision did not stop the DPR from insisting that the MPRS special session go ahead. Originally calling for an MPRS special session to be held for the purpose of reviewing Sukarno's performance as well as reaching a final decision on whether or not he was involved with the 30 September Movement (G30S), the DPR now asked that the MPRS special session add Suharto's appointment as acting president to the agenda.

The special session was opened on 7 March 1967, located in present-day Istora Gelora Bung Karno. On that day, Suharto delivered a speech absolving Sukarno of any involvement with the G30S. The special session now turned on the matter of the presidency. Such was the intensive debate surrounding this matter that the special session did not finish on 11 March 1967 as intended but had to go for another extra day. But when the decision was finally made, it was unanimous. On 12 March 1967, the MPRS agreed to withdraw its mandate from Sukarno and remove him as president. Suharto replaced Sukarno as acting president.

== Cabinet ==
Suharto retained the Ampera Cabinet, which had been formed by him in July 1966. He reshuffled this cabinet in October 1967 and created the Revised Ampera Cabinet.

== Home affairs ==
=== Legislative elections ===
The 1966 MPRS General Session passed a resolution calling for legislative elections to be held no later than 5 July 1968 and this became one of the first matters that Suharto attempted to address during his acting presidency. In doing this, he would have to deal with political parties.

For the political parties, the main point of contention was whether the legislative election would use the district system or proportional representation. In the previous year, the armed forces had expressed interest in the district system and thus handed to the DPR an election bill which favors the district system. The bill was successfully blocked in the DPR, as the list of parties not wanting change to the district system included the Indonesian National Party (PNI) and Nahdlatul Ulama (NU). With time running out, Suharto needed to hammer out a compromise.

Suharto held a series of meetings during the first three months of his acting presidency with the leadership of the political parties. To accommodate the political parties, Suharto backed out of the notion of a district system and began supporting proportional representation; the trade-off being that the Government would be able to appoint some of the DPR members. The breakthrough was made on 25 July 1967, when the political parties agreed that the legislative election would be held using proportional representation, that the government will appoint 100 MPs out of the 460 in the DPR, and that the government would appoint 1/3 of the deputies of the new People's Consultative Assembly (MPR).

Despite the breakthrough it quickly became clear that it would be difficult to meet the deadline set by the MPRS. The bill would have to be rewritten and would have to go through the proper procedures before it could be passed. The bill was resubmitted to the DPR on 16 December 1967 but by January 1968, Suharto reported to the chairman and vice-chairmen of the MPRS that it would be impossible to hold a Legislative Election in 1968.

=== Dealing with Sukarno ===
The MPRS Resolution which appointed Suharto to the acting presidency also gave him the power to take legal action against Sukarno. Suharto chose not to take any legal action and instead, Sukarno was still allowed to reside at the Presidential Palace and enjoy his freedom. Suharto also continued to insist that Sukarno was still the Head of State. Speaking on 13 March 1967, Suharto insisted that Sukarno was still President and Head of State, although without the political power that came with the office. This state of affairs did not last long. By May, Suharto decided that Sukarno was no longer allowed to use the title of President of the Republic of Indonesia and placed the former president under house arrest at Bogor Palace.

=== Other policies ===
During the course of 1967, Suharto confirmed that West Papua would be given a plebiscite concerning the matter of integration with Indonesia—the Act of Free Choice. On 12 September 1967, he signed a bill into a law which approved the formation of Bengkulu Province. Shortly thereafter, 1 October was declared Pancasila Sanctity Day on 27 September.

== Foreign affairs ==
The idea of pooling together the nations of Southeast Asia into one organization came from Thanat Khoman the Thai minister of foreign affairs. He suggested the idea to Indonesia's minister of foreign affairs, Adam Malik who promised to bring it up with Suharto. Suharto was interested in the idea and sent Malik to a conference in Thailand in August 1967. The conference was also attended by the ministers of foreign affairs of Malaysia, Singapore, and Philippines. On 8 August 1967, the five foreign ministers signed the Bangkok Declaration, marking the formation of the Association of South East Asian Nations (ASEAN). The declaration called among other things for the cooperation to help accelerate economic growth and promote stability in the region.

The reversal of Sukarno's policy of confrontation with Malaysia was completed with the establishment of diplomatic relations between Indonesia and Malaysia in early September 1967. At the same time, diplomatic relations were also established with Singapore with the opening of an Indonesian Embassy there. Running contrary to these two diplomatic successes was the deterioration of Indonesia's relationship with the People's Republic of China. The perception of the Indonesian Government was that China had backed the Indonesian Communist Party (PKI). The deterioration was not helped by the fact that the response to Indonesia's suspicion was the ideological zeal of China's Cultural Revolution. In October 1967, Indonesia announced that it was freezing diplomatic relations with China.

The emergence of Suharto as acting president was well received by the Western countries, who was keen to not only invest but give aid. Relationship with the Soviet Bloc cooled down, but Suharto would nevertheless work towards repaying the debt incurred during the Sukarno government.

== Defense and security ==
The first order of business for Suharto was to give official recognition to the non-military mission and roles of the Armed Forces of the Republic of Indonesia (ABRI) as commander in chief, minister of defense, and chief of staff of the army. Measures had been taken to create a doctrinal justification for the armed forces' interference in non-military matters, formulated as dwifungsi and hankamrata by one of his immediate predecessors as defense minister, Abdul Haris Nasution. This culminated in August 1966 with the formulation of the Four Duties, One Function (Catur Dharma Eka Karya, Cadek) Doctrine. The doctrine stated that in addition to its defense and security role, the ABRI will also take part and would serve in other fields outside of the aforementioned functions of defense and security, including politics, culture, education and economy. In a speech to the forces on 31 March 1967, Suharto called on the ABRI to adopt and implement the Cadek Doctrine as part of its official doctrinal basis.

The next step was to continue purging the armed forces and police of any remaining PKI and Sukarnoist elements. Within the army, the most intense purges happened in Central Java, East Java, and North Sumatra with the commanders of the 1st, 4th and 5th Regional Military Commands (Kodam) supervising the areas in question leading the purge. Outside of the army, the air force had been weakened enough by its alleged involvement in the 30 September Movement by its then chief of staff, Omar Dhani. The police tried to resist, but political pressure became too strong for them to overcome. Only the navy resisted, its chief of staff criticizing the purges as practice reminiscent of the Old Order.

Suharto also began reorganizing the command structure of the ABRI. The first step was taken by stripping the commanders of the army, navy, air force and police of their cabinet rank and ministries (the army, navy, air force, and police ministries, which were fused into the Ministry of Defense and Public Security) in August 1967, leaving only the minister of defense and security and the commander of the armed forces with cabinet memberships. Suharto's acting presidency also saw the establishment of the State Intelligence Coordinating Agency (BAKIN), another agency to ensure state security in addition to the Operational Command for the Restoration of Security and Order (Kopkamtib), whose commander was also a member of the cabinet. In addition to all this, Suharto issued a regulation regarding pay for all ABRI active serving personnel. The regulation provided provisions for pay, conditions for pay rise, and the various types of allowances for military personnel in active service and their families.

Beginning in July, Indonesia faced a security problem in the form of the North Kalimantan People's Forces (Paraku) and the People of Sarawak's Guerilla Forces (PGRS), two guerilla armies consisting of people of Chinese ethnicity, with communist leanings, and backed by Beijing. By the end of 1967, ABRI troops, working together with elements of the Malaysian Armed Forces, had made progress but it was unknown as to when the conflict could have been decisively ended.

== Justice ==
In an effort to help the government form policy in this field, law enforcement agencies (the Supreme Court, the Ministry of Justice, the Attorney General's Office, and the National Police) held a conference in Cibogo, West Java. The agencies issued a joint communique which called for: elongating working days for legal procedures, increasing the amount of facilities for legal procedures, maximizing the amount of manpower for legal procedures, improving facilities, and improving coordination between the courts, the attorneys, and the police.

In the months leading up to Suharto's assumption of the acting presidency, the trials of Old Order figures revealed that they had been very corrupt. To address this problem and to return any money that belonged to the state, Suharto formed the State Finance Supervision (Pekuneg) in April 1967. However, it would not be long before accusations of corruption were thrown at the new government. Suharto responded to this by forming the Abolition of Corruption Team (TPK) on 2 December 1967.

== Economics and finance ==
=== General economic conditions ===
By the end of 1967, the Suharto government had been able to reduce inflation from 650% at the end of the previous year to 120%.

=== Fiscal policy ===
With regards to the budget, Suharto undertook a policy of a balanced budget, and the Sukarno-era practice of printing extra money to raise funds when the budget ran short was discontinued. Technically speaking, however, Suharto's budgets ran deficits, because foreign aid and external borrowing were not counted as revenue.

The new government also undertook a reform of the tax system. On 26 August 1967, the DPR passed the Amendment and Revision of Collection Methods for Income, Wealth, and Corporate Taxes Law, with Suharto smoothing out the details through a Government Regulation (Peraturan Pemerintah). Under the new tax system, taxpayers had two methods by which they could pay tax. The first method was the individual tax counting (menghitung pajak sendiri) method. Using this method, it was up to the individual to count the amount of tax they were to pay and hand in the tax to tax offices. The second method was the non-individual tax counting (menghitung pajak orang lain) method. In this method, an individual was appointed by the head of the tax inspection to count and pay the taxes of other individuals. If the individual counting the tax abused their position, they could be subjected to a fine of paying 100% tax. Under this system, the roles of the tax officials are reduced to giving information and making sure that the amount of tax that had been paid is accurate.

=== Monetary policy ===
In regards to monetary policy, interest rates were kept between 6% and 9%. Steps were also taken to reform the exchange rate system by the abolition of the multiple exchange rate of the Sukarno system in July 1967.

In May 1967, the liberalization of the banking sector was continued. Ten foreign-owned banks and a joint venture bank were allowed to open. For the foreign-owned banks, the catch was that they were only allowed to operate in Jakarta. On 30 December 1967, the DPR passed the Fundamentals of Banking Law. This law categorized banks based on their functions and contained the guidelines for establishing banks. Further regulations were expounded by Suharto in February 1968.

=== Agriculture ===
With agricultural production still not functioning at maximum capacity, Suharto had to make do with ensuring that the supply of rice and the stability of price was guaranteed. On 10 May 1967, Suharto formed the Logistics Affairs Agency (Bulog), to look after these matters. Its position was further strengthened when Suharto named it as the single purchasing agency for rice with Bank Indonesia as the single financing agency. Bulog immediately set a target of purchasing 597,000 tonnes of rice for the year but would delay when it comes to purchasing rice, preferring instead to wait until harvest season to make their purchase. However, that year's harvest was bad, and there was a shortage of rice from September 1967 onwards. Although the bad harvest meant that Bulog was unable to fulfill its target purchase, it had 280,000 tonnes of rice under its control. Nevertheless, instead of sending its supply of rice to the market, Bulog focused instead on distributing rice to members of ABRI and the civil service. With high demand and no step being taken on the supply side, the price of rice had nowhere to go but up, its high price causing discontent within the population towards the end of the year.

On 8 July 1967, the DPR passed the Guidelines for Animal Husbandry and Health Law, calling for setting aside land to grow animal food and for vaccination against animal diseases as well as categorizing the different kinds of farming enterprises and calling on the government to invest capital in animal husbandry.

=== Trade ===
In July 1967, the government simplified the export and import procedures in addition to taking a step back and giving private sector an opportunity and assistance to conduct trade. For the year 1967, Indonesia was able to earn $770 million from its exports, although it would spend $805 million from its imports and thus running a trade deficit.

In earning $770 million from exports, $244 million was earned from exporting petroleum, whilst $526 million was earned from non-petroleum exports. These non-petroleum exports included timber, rubber, coffee, tin, palm oil, tea, tobacco, pepper, copra, and palm seeds. Timber was the highest non-petroleum export, raking in $227.8 million. In spending $805 million on imports, $68 million was spent on petroleum, whilst $737 million was spent on non-petroleum imports. Some of the non-petroleum imports included rice, flour, fertilizers, cement, paper, iron, steel, tractors, and aircraft. For the most part, the imports were raw materials, which constituted 36.6% of the imports, followed by consumption goods and capital goods on 35.8% and 27.6%, respectively.

=== Natural resources ===
==== Mining ====
Mining, both for oil and mineral resources alike, received legal recognition under the Guidelines of Mining Law. It gave guidelines for mining processes as well as giving private enterprise the opportunity to do business in the mining sector. Under this law, the private enterprises are to pay fees for the contract, exploration, and exploitation to the Government who in turn will hand it over to the Provincial and Regency Governments to be used for development. The importance of petroleum quickly become apparent by the fact that it was Indonesia's top export earner for the year 1967, bringing in $770 million's worth of revenue.

==== Forestry ====
In the field of forestry, the DPR passed the Guidelines of Forestry Law on 24 May 1967. The law outlines the categories of forests, from protected forests, which exists for the purpose of preventing floods and erosions to production forests, from which timbers were cut down to be exported. It also set provision for nature reserves and forests that were set aside for tourism.

In December 1967, Suharto issued regulations for private enterprises wishing to exploit Indonesian forests. Firstly, they would have to pay license fees. Secondly, they would have to pay royalties to the government based on the amount of forest that they intended to make a profit from. As part of the policy, Suharto regulated that the region from which the forest was exploited would be given first priority in receiving the money made from the two fees for the purpose of regional development.

=== Investment and foreign aid ===
At the beginning of 1967, the government passed the Foreign Investment Law. By the end of 1967, 23 projects with the backing of foreign capital was approved: 14 direct investments, 8 joint ventures, and 1 working contract. Another investment law, this time directed towards domestic investors, was also in the process of being formulated.

Starting from February 1967, the government began receiving aid from a group of donor nations and or organizations called the Inter-Governmental Group on Indonesia (IGGI). IGGI consisted of Australia, Belgium, the United Kingdom, Canada, France, Japan, New Zealand, Switzerland, the United States, the Asian Development Bank (ADB), the International Monetary Fund (IMF), the United Nations Development Program, and the World Bank. In 1967, the government received $675.4 million in aid, consisting of credit, food aid, infrastructural aid, and technical aid. With regards to the Communist Bloc, the nations from which Sukarno had already borrowed heavily during his presidency, Suharto wanted Indonesia to settle all of its debts plus interest, although debts would still be rescheduled. Starting from mid September to early October 1967, protocols on debt rescheduling were agreed upon and signed between Indonesia and the governments of East Germany, Czechoslovakia, and Hungary. In November 1967, it was the Soviet Union's turn to sign a similar protocol with Indonesia.

=== Infrastructure ===
In July 1967, the government completed the Jatiluhur Dam in West Java. The government saw the dam as a multipurpose infrastructure; expecting it to supply water to Jakarta and West Java, generate electricity, prevent flooding in Citarum, increase fishing production, and provide recreation areas for tourists visiting from around Java and nationwide because of its distance from the capital.

=== State-owned enterprises ===
Throughout the course of his acting presidency, Suharto did some work in regards to the state-owned enterprises. The government established new state-owned enterprises in the fields of the textile industry and urban planning. Similar to parallel regulations regarding the armed forces and the bureaucracy, the government also issued regulations regarding pay and allowances for those working in state-owned enterprises.

=== Cooperatives ===
On 18 December 1967, the DPR passed the Basics of Cooperatives Law. Although the previous government already had its own cooperatives law, which was passed in 1965, the Suharto government viewed it as a law that politicized cooperatives. By requirement of the Sukarno-era legislation, a cooperative had to represent nationalist, religious, and communist elements based on Sukarno's Nationalism, Religion, and Communism (Nasakom) concept, and cooperatives was required to view itself as an equipment of the revolution. The new law placed cooperatives back as a purely economic institution and, to undo the previous cooperatives law, did not support discrimination based on political beliefs of its leadership. The new law also called for the government to guide, assist, supervise, and protect cooperatives in its policies. This, in effect, gave the government authority over cooperatives, although considerable autonomy was still given to the cooperatives.

== Social issues ==
=== Health ===
As acting president, Suharto had already begun to take steps to show that he wanted to adopt family planning as government policy on a national scale, having originally been adopted by Jakarta governor Ali Sadikin. In 1967, he signed the UN Declaration on Population and had already taken steps to implement family planning. 6,456 people had participated in the family planning program (KB) by the end of 1967, with the infrastructural backing of 116 KB clinics.

=== Social security ===
The Ministry of Manpower experimented with a social security system in 1967. Through a Ministerial Regulation, a social security fund was established by the Department of Manpower. Under this fund, all costs for illnesses, pregnancy, giving birth, and deaths were covered by the ministry. Only employees of private enterprises were eligible for this entitlement, and it was not compulsory.

=== Veterans affairs ===
On 7 August 1967, the DPR passed the Veterans of the Republic of Indonesia Law. The law outlined not only the criteria for being a veteran, but also their privileges; including receiving preferences should a veteran apply to be a civil servant in government, being allowed to go back to their old civilian jobs after they finished their service, and to receive skills education from the government before they return to full civilian life. The law also called on the government to ensure the veterans' social security through grants. The law granted the Veterans' Legion of Indonesia, the national organization for veterans' affairs that was established in 1957, its own charter and a revised leadership.

=== Religion ===
In religious affairs, Suharto adopted a stance of supporting religious tolerance and was against forced religious conversion. In practice, however, this religious tolerance did not extend to Confucianism.

=== Chinese Indonesians ===
By the end of his acting presidency, Suharto had taken measures to suppress the cultural life of its Chinese Indonesian citizens. The policies that were adopted included the non-recognition of Confucianism as a religion, banning Chinese holidays such as the Chinese New Year, banning Chinese newspapers, banning Chinese schools, and banning the usage and teaching of Mandarin.

== Information and telecommunication ==
In accordance with the Basic Points of the Press Law, which was passed in late 1966, the government formed the Press Council in July 1967. The Press Council was an institution designed to assist the government in developing and fostering the Indonesian media. The Press Council was to be chaired by the minister of information.

Towards the end of 1967, the government also moved to regulate amateur radio broadcasting. Although the Telecommunication Law of 1964 had promised punishment to anyone who was illegally owning radio transmitters, amateur radio stations had begun forming after G30S as a form of political dissent against the then Sukarno government and had become quite popular as a hobby. The government regulated that amateur radio stations would be allowed to continue provided that the broadcasters get a permit from the government (through the Ministry of Information) before broadcasting, and that they join a national amateur radio organization.

== Bureaucracy ==
As acting president, Suharto began taking steps to reform the bureaucracy by forming a taskforce called the Team Assisting the President for the Ordering of Government Apparatus and Administration. In December 1967, the government executed two policies with regards to the bureaucracy. The first one was a regulation regarding the pay, pay rise, and allowances of the Indonesian civil servants, similar to parallel regulations regarding the pay and allowances of the ABRI personnel and the employees of state-owned enterprises. The second one was an announcement that the government was raising the pensions of retired civil servants as well as allowances for the widows and children of retired civil servants.

== Election to the presidency ==
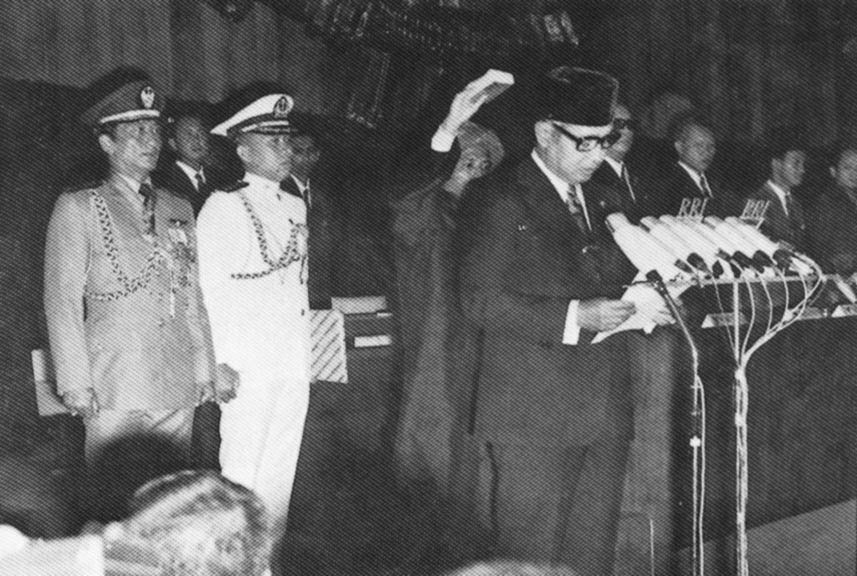
Suharto taking his presidential oath of office, 27 March 1968

The failure to hold a legislative election by 5 July 1968 meant that a new People's Consultative Assembly (MPR) would not be able to form, which also meant that a new president and vice president could not be elected through an MPR general session. For Suharto, this meant that the length of his term as acting president was in doubt. Wishing to solidify his position, Suharto used the DPR to lobby the MPRS to hold a general session. The MPRS leadership agreed and scheduled a general session to be held in late March. The general session was opened on 21 March 1968 and the first matter that it turned to was the legislative election. The MPRS quickly passed a resolution, setting 5 July 1971 as the new deadline for the legislative election.

When the MPRS turned its attention to the presidency, Suharto faced an obstacle in the form of MPRS chairman, General Abdul Haris Nasution. Nasution was of the opinion that Suharto should deliver an accountability speech before running for president. This notion did not gain momentum, and Nasution was forced to let the matter go. Suharto was officially elected on 27 March 1968 to a full five-year term, officially becoming the second president of Indonesia. Nasution's advice would only materialize towards the end of Suharto's first term, when Suharto gave such an address on the 1973 MPR General Session.
