= President of Indonesia =

Head of state and government

President of the Republic of Indonesia
- Presiden Republik Indonesia
- Presidential seal

- Presidential standard

- Incumbent; Prabowo Subianto since 20 October 2024
- Government of Indonesia
- Style: Mr. President (informal); The Honourable (formal); His Excellency (diplomatic)
- Type: Head of state; Head of government; Commander-in-chief
- Member of: Cabinet; National Defense Council
- Residence: Merdeka Palace (official); Garuda Palace; State Palace; Bogor Palace; Tampaksiring Palace; Gedung Agung; Cipanas Palace
- Seat: Jakarta
- Appointer: Direct popular election (Note: Since 2004, previously via the People's Consultative Assembly.)
- Term length: Five years, renewable once
- Constituting instrument: Constitution of Indonesia
- Precursor: Governor-General of the Dutch East Indies
- Inaugural holder: Sukarno
- Formation: 18 August 1945 (81 years ago)
- Deputy: Vice President
- Salary: Rp 62,657,809 (US$ 4,379) per month
- Website: Official website

The Indonesian presidential emblem, commonly used in legislature documents

Sukarno, the first president of Indonesia

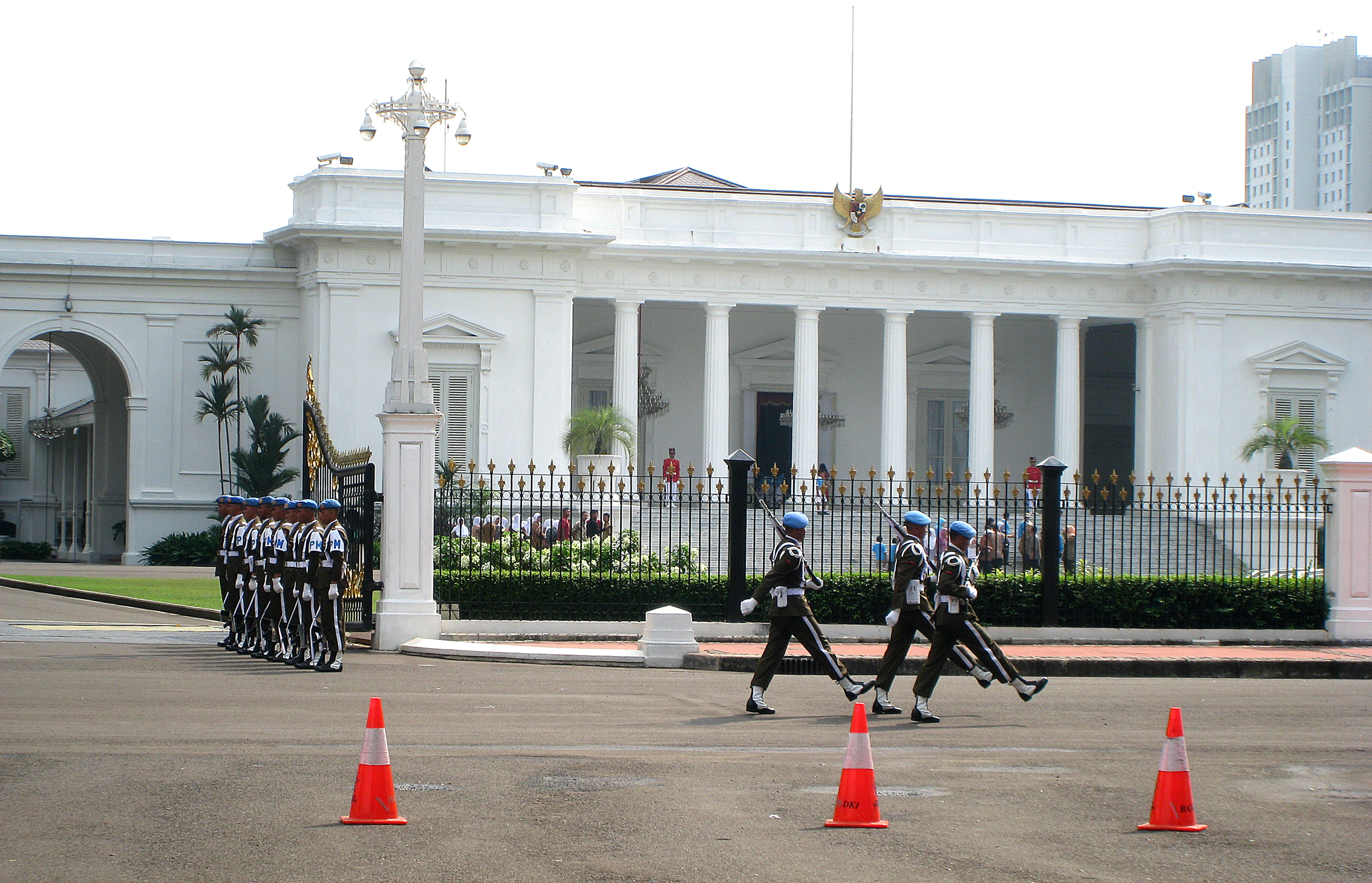
Merdeka Palace, the official residence of the president of Indonesia

The president of the Republic of Indonesia (Indonesian: Presiden Republik Indonesia) is the head of state and head of government of the Republic of Indonesia. The president is the leader of the executive branch of the Indonesian government and the commander-in-chief of the Indonesian National Armed Forces and the Indonesian National Police. Since 2004, the president and vice president have been directly elected to a five-year term, once renewable, allowing for a maximum of ten years in office.

The current president is Prabowo Subianto, who assumed office on 20 October 2024.

== History ==
=== Sukarno era ===
The Indonesian presidency was established during the formulation of the 1945 Constitution by the Investigating Committee for Preparatory Work for Independence (BPUPK). The office was first filled on 18 August 1945, when Sukarno was elected by acclamation by the Preparatory Committee for Indonesian Independence (PPKI) because, according to the Transitional Provisions of the Constitution, "the president and the vice president for the first time shall be elected by the PPKI." Also, the body responsible for the presidential elections, the People's Consultative Assembly (MPR), had not yet been formed. On 16 October 1945, Vice President Mohammad Hatta announced a vice-presidential decree which gave the Central Indonesian National Committee (KNIP) legislative powers. On 11 November 1945, the KNIP made the decision to separate the role of head of state from that of head of government. Although a new constitution had not been set up yet, Indonesia was now a de facto parliamentary democracy, with the president as a ceremonial head of state whose function was to ask the prime minister as the head of government to form a new cabinet.

During the Indonesian National Revolution, both Sukarno and Hatta were captured by the Dutch in Yogyakarta on 18 December 1948. Sukarno then gave a mandate for Sjafruddin Prawiranegara to form an emergency government. This was done and the Emergency Government of the Republic of Indonesia (PDRI) was formed in Sumatra with Prawiranegara as its chairman. Prawiranegara handed back his mandate to Sukarno on 13 July 1949. On 17 December 1949, Sukarno was elected president of the United States of Indonesia (RIS), and the presidential mandate passed to Assaat. When the RIS was about to be replaced by a unitary state, Asaat stepped down from the presidency, and Sukarno once again became president on 15 August 1950.

Indonesia now adopted the constitution that had been intended for RIS. Officially known as the Provisional Constitution, the document confirmed the president's role as the head of state, but it limited him to a mostly ceremonial role. He appointed a prime minister on the advice of formateurs.

Despite his limited constitutional role, Sukarno commanded great moral authority. Nonetheless, he was never content with the role of ceremonial head of State, and he grew increasingly disenchanted with western-style parliamentary democracy. In the early 1950s, he began calling for the implementation of "Guided Democracy", in which decisions would be made after lengthy deliberation with a view toward achieving a consensus under presidential "guidance".

The rest of the decade saw a series of unstable governments. Taking advantage of the situation, Sukarno made a speech in April 1959 and suggested that Indonesia return to the 1945 Constitution. The People reacted enthusiastically and there was strong pressure on the Constitutional Assembly, the body responsible for formulating a new constitution, to adopt the 1945 Constitution. When the assembly did not budge, Sukarno issued a presidential decree on 5 July 1959 declaring that Indonesia was returning to the 1945 Constitution. That document made the president head of government as well as head of state. On 18 May 1963, the People's Consultative Assembly elected Sukarno president for life.

Although Indonesia had re-adopted the 1945 Constitution, it did not mean that it was strictly adhered to. MPR, which at this stage was still on a provisional basis (MPRS), was subservient to the president despite its status of the nation's highest governing body. It was only in 1966, when the political tide began to turn against Sukarno that the MPRS nominally regained its rightful constitutional status. In 1967, Sukarno was forced to resign as president, and Army Chief of Staff Suharto was appointed as acting president.

=== Suharto era ===
Suharto was elected president in his own right in 1968. During his rise to power, Suharto seemed determined to observe at least the forms of the constitution, and this continued when he became president. Under the constitution, the MPR was responsible for formulating the Outlines of State Policy (GBHN); as president, Suharto was responsible for implementing them. Suharto also made it a presidential obligation to deliver accountability speeches near the end of his terms. During the speech, Suharto outlined the achievements that his administration had made and how those achievements had adhered to the GBHN set by the MPR. Despite the constitutional and democratic façade, Suharto made sure that the MPR was subservient to him. In 1969, a law was passed that required appointments to the MPR to be made official by the president. He also took measures that largely emasculated the opposition parties. For example, he had the power to issue governmental regulations in lieu of law. Nominally, if these regulations were not approved by the House of Representatives (DPR, the pre-2004 legislative branch), they were considered revoked. However, given the DPR's infrequent sessions and the near-total dominance of the pro-government political grouping, Golkar, such approval was a mere formality. Thus, for all intents and purposes, Suharto ruled by decree for most of his tenure. For the better part of Suharto's rule, he effectively held all governing power in the nation.

=== Reform era ===
After Suharto fell from power on 21 May 1998, the presidency experienced changes as a result of the reform movement. Compared to Suharto, who had all of his accountability speeches accepted, B. J. Habibie had his only accountability speech rejected. Abdurrahman Wahid became the first president who had to beat another candidate to be elected, as Sukarno and Suharto had been sole candidates. As a result, Wahid was also the first president to be elected through counting votes instead of by acclamation. However, Wahid was impeached and removed from office by the MPR. This was a clear sign that while the presidency is the key institution, the MPR was now a check on the president's power. Wahid was replaced by his vice-president, Megawati Sukarnoputri, daughter of Sukarno and former opposition leader during Suharto's presidency.

During the 2001 MPR Annual Session, the constitution was amended to provide for the direct election of the president beginning with 2004. In response to Sukarno and Suharto's abuses of power, other amendments passed at that session hedged the presidency about with numerous checks and balances to prevent another president from completely dominating the system. For example, the president was limited to two terms, whether successive or separated. They also lost the right to legislate, but could propose legislation. In the 2004 Indonesian presidential election, Susilo Bambang Yudhoyono became Indonesia's first directly-elected president, beating incumbent Megawati Sukarnoputri in the run-off election. He was re-elected in 2009. In 2014, Yudhoyono finished his second presidential term and was barred from seeking re-election.

The 2014 Indonesian presidential election was held on 9 July 2014 and matched former general and Suharto's ex-son in law Prabowo Subianto against the governor of Jakarta, Joko Widodo. On 22 July, the General Elections Commission announced Joko Widodo's victory. He and his vice-president, Jusuf Kalla, were sworn in on 20 October for a five-year term.

== Requirements to run for office ==
The Amended 1945 Constitution: The presidential candidate has to be an Indonesian citizen since their birth, who has not willingly become a citizen in another nation, has not betrayed the nation, and is physically and mentally capable of performing the duties. The amended constitution also states that further criteria will be determined by laws. The president is also required to be nominated by a political party or a coalition of political parties.

2017 Law No. 7 Regarding Presidential and Vice-Presidential Elections
The presidential candidate must:

- be mindful of God;
- have been an Indonesian citizen since their birth, who has not willingly become a citizen of another nation;
- hold Indonesian citizenship along with their spouse, if any;
- have not betrayed the nation, and has not been involved in any corruption or other serious criminal offense;
- be physically and mentally capable of performing the duties as well as free from any drug abuse;
- be a permanent resident in the territory of the Republic of Indonesia;
- have reported their wealth to the Corruption Eradication Commission;
- have no debt individually or collectively that can create a loss for the state;
- have not been declared bankrupt by a court decision;
- have never been involved in any despicable act;
- not concurrently be running as a candidate for member of the legislature;
- be registered as a voter;
- be registered as a tax payer and have paid taxes for at least the last five years;
- have never previously served as president for two terms;
- be faithful to Pancasila, the 1945 Constitution, the Republic of Indonesia, and Bhinneka Tunggal Ika;
- have never been sentenced to jail for five years or more;
- not be less than 40 years of age (Note: Had been revised by The decision of the Constitutional Court of Indonesia);
- have graduated at least from the senior high school or its equivalent;
- not be a former member of the Communist Party of Indonesia, including its mass organizations, or not have been directly involved in the 30 September Movement;
- have a vision, mission, and program in running the government.
- be supported by political parties or a coalition of political parties that obtained 20% of the seats in the DPR or 25% of the total valid votes in the previous election may nominate president and vice president candidate (Note: Had been revised by The decision of the Constitutional Court of Indonesia)

The decision of the Constitutional Court of Indonesia
The presidential candidate must:

- Be at least 40 years old or have/are currently holding positions that are elected through general elections, including regional head elections
- The nomination of candidate is by political parties or coalitions of political parties participating in the election is not based on the percentage of the number of seats in the DPR or the number of valid votes obtained nationally

== Election, term of office, constitutional requirements ==
The Amended 1945 Constitution: Together with the vice president, the president is elected directly by the people on a single ticket. Further election rules are determined by laws passed by the DPR. The president-elect is required to read either an oath or a promise of office before officially becoming president. The term of office is five years and after that the president can be re-elected for only one more term, whether successive or separated. The president and vice-president candidates must receive over half the votes total, including at least 20% of the votes in at least half the 38 provinces to win. In the event that no ticket wins an outright victory, a runoff is held between the two tickets with the first and second most votes in the first round, with the ticket that receives the most votes elected as President and Vice President.

- The Original 1945 Constitution: Together with the vice-president, the president is elected by the MPR with the largest number of votes. The president-elect is also required to read either an oath or a promise of office before officially becoming president. The term of office is five years and the president can be re-elected.
- The 1950 Provisional Constitution: Together with the vice-president, the president is elected according to rules specified by laws. The president-elect is required to read either an oath or a promise or a statement of office before officially becoming president. The president is constitutionally required to live where the seat of government is.

== Oath or affirmation of office ==
Before entering their office, the president or vice-president must take an oath or affirmation in the session of the People's Consultative Assembly (MPR). If the MPR cannot hold a session, the oath or promise is made in a session of the House of Representatives (DPR). If the DPR cannot hold a session, the oath or affirmation is made before the leadership of the MPR in the presence of the leadership of the Supreme Court.

- Oath of Office of the President of the Republic of Indonesia: "I swear by God to fulfill the duties of President (Vice President) of the Republic of Indonesia to the best of my capabilities and in the fairest way possible, to uphold the Constitution by all means and to execute all laws and regulations as straightforwardly as possible as well as to dedicate myself to the service of the Nation and the People."
- Pledge of Office of the President of the Republic of Indonesia: "I solemnly pledge to fulfill the duties of President (Vice-President) of the Republic of Indonesia to the best of my capabilities and in the fairest way possible, to uphold the Constitution by all means and to execute all laws and regulations as straightforwardly as possible as well as to dedicate myself to the service of the Nation and the People."

== Powers ==
- The Amended 1945 Constitution: The president has constitutional authority over the government and has the power to name and remove ministers. They have the right to propose bills to DPR, to discuss bills with the DPR to reach an agreement, make government regulations in accordance with laws, and in the case of emergencies has the power to make government regulations in lieu of law. At military level, the president holds supreme authority over the Indonesian National Armed Forces. Diplomatically, they can only sign treaties, rehabilitate prisoners, and appoint Judicial Committee members with the DPR's agreement. The president can only appoint ambassadors and accept ambassadors from other countries by taking into account the DPR's considerations. They have the power to grant pardons but must consider the advice of the Supreme Court. The president also has the final say over chief justice candidates.
- The Original 1945 Constitution: The president has constitutional authority over the government and has the power to name and remove ministers. They have the power to create laws with the agreement of the House of Representatives (Indonesia) (DPR), to make Government regulations in accordance with laws, and in the case of emergencies has the power to make government regulations in lieu of law. Militarily, the president holds supreme authority over the Army, Navy, and Air Force whilst security-wise, the president has the power to declare a state of emergency. Diplomatically, the president, with the agreement of the DPR, has the power to declare war, peace, and to sign treaties. They also appoint ambassadors and consuls as well as accepting ambassadors from other countries. Finally, the president has power to give amnesties and pardons as well as awarding titles and honours.
- The 1950 Provisional Constitution: The president has the power to name cabinets and appoint the prime minister with the advice of formateurs. They can remove ministers from office and has the right to be informed of important matters by the council of ministers. As the head of state, the president has the power to dissolve the DPR and order for an election to be held within one month. At military level, they hold supreme authority over the Armed Forces although any decision on this matter needs to be countersigned by the appropriate ministers and wartime control of troops has to be placed under an Armed Forces commander. The president requires permission from the DPR to declare war and sign treaties although the president has independent power to appoint ambassadors and to accept them. They also have the power to grant pardons.

== Assistance in performing duties ==
- The Amended 1945 Constitution: The president is assisted by the vice president and their ministers. The ministers are appointed and dismissed by the president. Each minister is in charge of certain government affairs. The president is also allowed to form their own advisory teams which will further be regulated by laws passed by the DPR.
- The Original 1945 Constitution: The president is assisted by the vice president and their ministers. The president is also able to seek advice from the Supreme Advisory Council (DPA).
- The 1950 Provisional Constitution: The president is assisted by the vice president.

== Line of succession and impeachment ==
- The Amended 1945 Constitution: If the president dies, resigns, removed from office, or is unable to perform their duties for any reason, they are replaced by the vice president. If the vice presidency becomes vacant, the president nominates two candidates and the MPR has to elect the new vice president out of the two within 60 days. If the president and the vice president dies, resigns, removed from office, or are unable to perform their duties for any reason, the government will be taken over together by the minister of home affairs, minister of foreign affairs, and minister of defense, and the MPR must elect a new president and vice president within 30 days, from the two pairs of candidates nominated by the political party or coalition of political parties whose candidates were the winner and the runner-up in the previous presidential election.
- Under the amended constitution, the president and vice president can be impeached and removed from office. If the president is viewed to have violated the law in the form of treason against the state, corruption, bribery, other serious crimes, or disgraceful acts, and/or no longer meets the requirements to be president, the DPR can ask the Constitutional Court to look into the matter, during which it takes three months to make a decision. The DPR's request to the Constitutional Court can only be made with the support of two-thirds of the total number of DPR members who are present at a session which is attended by at least two-thirds of the DPR's members (at least 44.44% of the total members of the DPR). If the Constitutional Court decides that the president has violated the law, the DPR can motion for the MPR to convene. The president would then be given one last chance to defend himself before the MPR makes the decision whether or not the president should be removed from office. The decision of the MPR to dismiss the president and/or the vice president is made with the approval of at least two-thirds of the members of the MPR who are present at the session which is attended by at least three-quarters of all members of the MPR (at least half of the total members of the MPR).

The line of succession previously written as follows:

- The Original 1945 Constitution: If the president dies, resigns, or is unable to perform their duties for any reason, they are replaced by the vice president.
- The 1950 Provisional Constitution: If the president dies, resigns, or is unable to perform their duties for any reason, they are replaced by the vice president.

Although there was no article about impeachment in the original 1945 Constitution, Sukarno and Abdurrahman Wahid were still impeached and removed from office in 1967 and 2001 respectively. Article on the impeachment of the president and vice president were only made after the Wahid's impeachment in the third amendment which was passed the month after.

== Post-presidency and decorations ==
=== Post-presidency rights ===
Law No.7 of 1978 stipulates that former presidents are entitled to a pension. Former presidents are also entitled to a house, with electricity, water, and telephone bills covered by the government. In addition to that, former presidents shall have free healthcare for their families and a car with a chauffeur.

=== Decorations ===
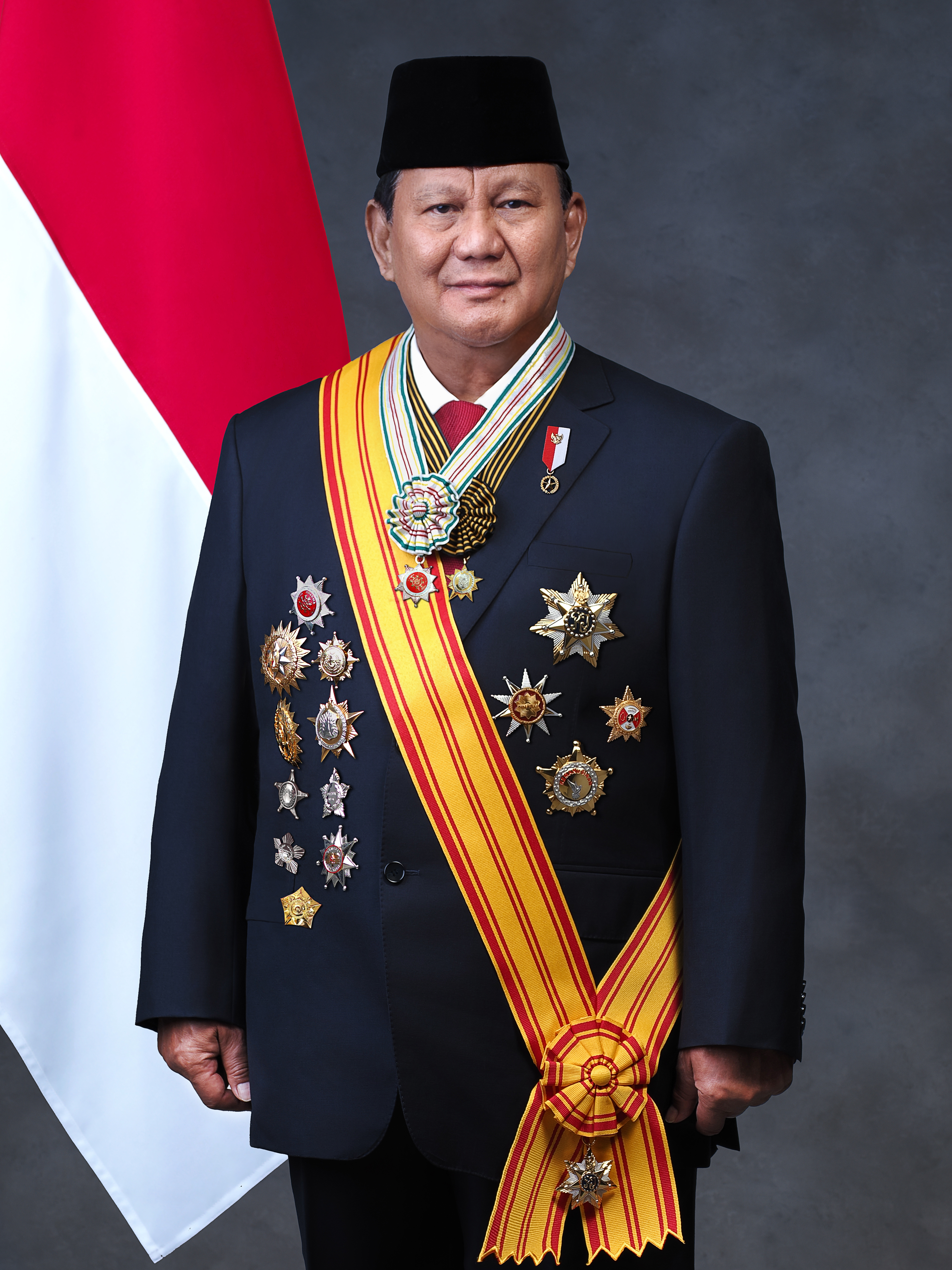
President Prabowo Subianto with presidential decorations (2024)

The presidents of Indonesia, as the issuer of decorations and the Grandmaster of Star Decorations (Tanda Kehormatan Bintang) are automatically awarded the highest class of all civilian and military Star Decorations. Currently there are 14 decorations which will be bestowed upon them soon after taking office, namely:

- Star of the Republic of Indonesia, 1st Class (Bintang Republik Indonesia Adipurna)
- Star of Mahaputera, 1st Class (Bintang Mahaputera Adipurna)
- Star of Merit, 1st Class (Bintang Jasa Utama)
- Star of Humanity (Bintang Kemanusiaan)
- Star of Democracy Upholder, 1st Class (Bintang Penegak Demokrasi)
- Star of Meritorious Service for Culture (Bintang Budaya Parama Dharma)
- Police Star of Merit (Bintang Bhayangkara)
- Guerilla Star (Bintang Gerilya)
- Sacred Star (Bintang Sakti)
- Star of Meritorious Service (Bintang Dharma)
- Star of Military Service, 1st Class (Bintang Yudha Dharma Utama)
- Army Medal of Merit, 1st Class (Bintang Kartika Eka Paksi Utama)
- Navy Medal, 1st Class (Bintang Jalasena Utama)
- Air Force Medal of Merit, 1st Class (Bintang Swa Bhuwana Paksa Utama)

== List of presidents ==
Montage of Indonesian president portraits. Chronologically from Left to right, top to bottom

=== During the Indonesian National Revolution ===
- Sukarno (18 August 1945 – 18 December 1948)
- Sjafruddin Prawiranegara (19 December 1948 – 13 July 1949) – Head of the Emergency Government of the Republic of Indonesia.
- Sukarno (13 July 1949 – 17 December 1949)
- Assaat (17 December 1949 – 15 August 1950) – during the United States of Indonesia, Sukarno became the president of the United States of Indonesia. The Republic was merely a component of the union.
- Sukarno (from 15 August 1950) – upon (re)-establishment of the unitary Republic of Indonesia.

== Latest election ==
The most recent presidential election was held in 2024 where Prabowo Subianto and his running mate Gibran Rakabuming Raka defeated Anies Baswedan and Ganjar Pranowo with 58.6% of the vote.

== See also ==
- Vice President of Indonesia
- Presidential state car
- Indonesian Air Force 01
- Paspampres
- List of presidents of Indonesia
