= Watampone =

Coordinates: 4°32′19″S 120°19′47″E

Watampone is a town in South Sulawesi province of Indonesia and the capital of Bone Regency. Known colloquially as Bone, it has a land area of 126.35 km^{2} and had a population of 149,336 at the 2020 Census; the official estimate as of mid-2023 was 151,554. It is divided administratively into three districts (kecamatan) within the Bone Regency - West Tanate Riattang, Tanate Riattang, and East Tanate Riattang. It is also the birthplace of the 10th and 12th Vice President of the Republic of Indonesia Jusuf Kalla.

== Climate ==
Watampone has a tropical rainforest climate (Af) with moderate rainfall from September to November and heavy to very heavy rainfall in the remaining months.

Climate data for Watampone
Month	Jan	Feb	Mar	Apr	May	Jun	Jul	Aug	Sep	Oct	Nov	Dec	Year
Mean daily maximum °C (°F)	30.0 (86.0)	30.1 (86.2)	30.4 (86.7)	30.8 (87.4)	31.0 (87.8)	30.5 (86.9)	30.5 (86.9)	31.2 (88.2)	31.7 (89.1)	32.2 (90.0)	31.5 (88.7)	30.4 (86.7)	30.9 (87.6)
Daily mean °C (°F)	26.4 (79.5)	26.5 (79.7)	26.6 (79.9)	26.8 (80.2)	27.0 (80.6)	26.3 (79.3)	25.8 (78.4)	26.1 (79.0)	26.5 (79.7)	27.1 (80.8)	27.1 (80.8)	26.6 (79.9)	26.6 (79.8)
Mean daily minimum °C (°F)	22.9 (73.2)	23.0 (73.4)	22.9 (73.2)	22.9 (73.2)	23.0 (73.4)	22.2 (72.0)	21.2 (70.2)	21.0 (69.8)	21.4 (70.5)	22.1 (71.8)	22.8 (73.0)	22.9 (73.2)	22.4 (72.2)
Average rainfall mm (inches)	150 (5.9)	150 (5.9)	185 (7.3)	241 (9.5)	359 (14.1)	302 (11.9)	253 (10.0)	142 (5.6)	102 (4.0)	99 (3.9)	118 (4.6)	159 (6.3)	2,260 (89)
Source: Climate-Data.org
