= Sidoarjo mud flow =

Mud volcano in the subdistrict of Porong, East Java, Indonesia

Coordinates: 7°31′40″S 112°42′42″E

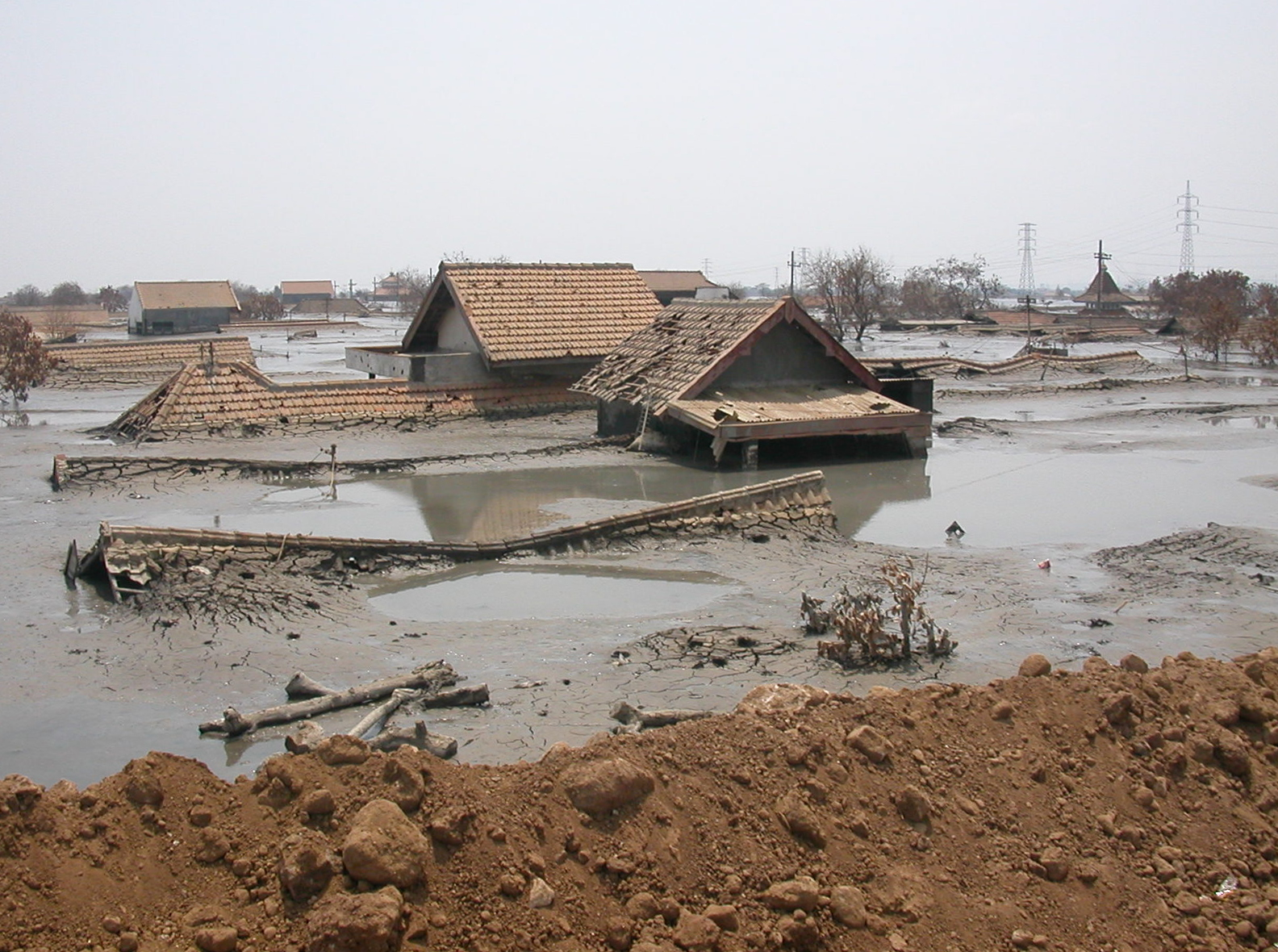
Homes submerged by the Sidoarjo mudflow

The Sidoarjo mudflow (commonly known as Lumpur Lapindo, wherein lumpur is the Indonesian word for mud; and as Lusi (short for Lumpur Sidoarjo) is the result of an erupting mud volcano in the subdistrict of Porong, Sidoarjo, in East Java, Indonesia, that has been active since May 2006. It is the largest mud volcano in the world. Responsibility for the disaster was assigned to the blowout of a natural gas well drilled by Lapindo Brantas, although company officials contend it was caused by a very distant earthquake that occurred in a different province.

At its peak, the blowout spewed up to 180,000 cubic metres (6,400,000 cu ft; 240,000 cu yd) of mud per day. By mid-August 2011, mud was being discharged at a rate of 10,000 cubic meters (13,000 cu yd) per day, with 15 bubbles around its gushing point. This was a significant decline from the previous year, a rate of 100,000 cubic meters (130,000 cu yd) per day, with 320 bubbles. Initial estimates suggested that the flow would continue for 25 to 30 years. Although the Sidoarjo mud flow has been contained by levees since November 2008, resultant floodings regularly disrupt local highways and villages, and further breakouts of mud are still possible.

== Geological setting ==
Mud volcano systems are fairly common, particularly in the Indonesian province of East Java. Beneath the island of Java is a half-graben lying in the east–west direction, filled with over-pressurized marine carbonates and marine muds. It forms an inverted extensional basin that has been geologically active since the Paleogene epoch. The basin started to become overpressurized during the Oligo-Miocene period. Some of the overpressurized mud escapes to the surface to form mud volcanoes, which have been observed at Sangiran Dome near Surakarta (Solo) in Central Java and near Purwodadi city, 200 km (120 mi) west of Lusi.

The East Java basin contains a significant amount of oil and gas reserves, therefore the region is known as a major concession area for mineral exploration. The Porong subdistrict, 14 kilometres (8.7 mi) south of Sidoarjo city, is known in the mineral industry as the Brantas Production Sharing Contract, an area of approximately 7,250 square kilometres (2,800 sq mi) that consists of three oil and gas fields: Wunut, Carat, and Tanggulangin. As of 2006, three companies—Santos (18%), MedcoEnergi (32%), and PT Lapindo Brantas (50%)—had concession rights for this area; PT Lapindo Brantas acted as an operator.

== Chronology ==
On 28 May 2006, PT Lapindo Brantas targeted gas in the Kujung Formation carbonates in the Brantas PSC area by drilling a borehole named the "Banjar-Panji 1 exploration well". In the first stage of drilling, the drill string first went through a thick clay seam (500–1,300 metres [1,640–4,265 ft] deep), then through sands, shales, volcanic debris, and finally into permeable carbonate rocks. The borehole was cased down to 1,091 m (3,579 ft). At 5:00 a.m. local time (UTC+7) on 29 May 2006, after the well had reached a total depth of 2,834 metres (9,298 ft), this time without a protective casing, water, steam, and a small amount of gas erupted at a location about 200 m southwest of the well. Two further eruptions occurred on the second and the third of June about 800–1,000 m northwest of the well, but these stopped on 5 June 2006. During these eruptions, hydrogen sulfide gas was released, and local villagers observed hot mud, thought to be at a temperature of around 60 °C (140 °F).

A magnitude 6.3 earthquake occurred in Yogyakarta at ~06:00 local time on 27 May 2006, approximately 250 kilometres (160 mi) southwest of Sidoarjo. It has been suggested that a small (20 barrel) mud loss occurred in the Banjar Panji-1 well seven minutes after the earthquake (consistent with the time taken for the seismic waves to reach the Lusi location), though there is no clear report of these losses in the drilling data, and it has also been alternatively reported that these losses occurred one hour before the earthquake. The well suffered a complete loss of circulation at 12:50 p.m. local time on 26 May 2006, which was between 1.5 and 4.75 hours after three large aftershocks. A loss of circulation happens when drilling mud—necessary for maintenance of well bore stability—that is pumped down a shaft does not return to the surface but is lost into an opening or a fault system. This mud loss problem was finally stopped when "loss circulation material" was pumped into the well, a standard practice in drilling an oil-and-gas well. A day later, the well suffered a "kick", an influx of formation fluid into the well bore. The kick was reported by Lapindo Brantas drilling engineers as having been killed within three hours, though alternative interpretations of drilling records, specifically ongoing fluctuations in downhole drill-pipe pressure, indicate that the kick continued for at least 24 hours. Early the next day, on 29 May 2006, steam, water, and mud began erupting up to 200 metres (660 ft) above the well, a phenomenon that is now known as the "Lusi mud volcano". Dense drilling mud and cement were pumped down the Banjar Panji-1 well at various times in the 48 hours after the mudflow started, in an attempt to kill the surface mud eruption. Lapindo Brantas daily drilling records state that "bubble intensity reduced and elapse time between each bubble is longer" after pumping dense drilling mud down the well, indicating direct communication between Banjar Panji-1 and the Sidoarjo mudflow.

== Possible causes ==
The Lusi eruption was a major disaster for the people living nearby, with the loss of homes, other properties, as well as livelihoods.

To explain what triggered the mud volcano, three hypotheses have been suggested, though none has won universal support:

- Drilling-induced fracturing or fault reactivation (reflecting a human-made event)
- Earthquake-triggered fault reactivation (reflecting a natural event)
- Geothermal processes (reflecting geothermal heating)

=== Drilling-induced fracturing ===
From a model developed by geologists working in the UK, the drilling pipe penetrated the overpressurized limestone, causing entrainment of mud by water. Whilst pulling the drill string out of the well, there were ongoing losses of drilling mud, as demonstrated by the daily reports stating "overpull increasing", "only 50% returns", and "unable to keep hole full". The loss of drilling mud and associated drop in downhole mud weight eventually resulted in a drilling kick, with over 365 barrels of fluid erupting at the Banjar Panji-1 wellhead. Blowout preventers were closed to help kill the kick, which resulted in a spike in downhole pressure within the wellbore. The drilling-induced triggering model proposes that the increase in pressure within the wellbore was sufficiently high to induce a large hydraulic fracture in the formation. The extra pressure caused the hydraulic fractures to propagate 1–2 km to the surface and emerge 200 m away from the well. The lack of protective casing in the bottom 1,742 m of the borehole is considered a key reason why the drilling kick could not be controlled and why pressures during the kick were high enough to initiate hydraulic fracturing. Alternatively, it has also been suggested that the increased fluid pressure in the borehole, due to the kick, may have triggered reactivation of a nearby fault system, rather than hydraulic fracturing (in a similar manner to how fluid injection can induce seismicity). Though steel casing is used to protect the well bore in oil or gas exploration, this can only be applied in stages after each new section of the hole is drilled; see oil well.

The relatively small distance, around 600 feet (180 m), between the Lusi mud volcano and the Banjar Panji-1 well may not be a coincidence, as less than a day before the start of the mudflow, the well suffered a kick. Lapindo's analysis suggests that the well has a low resistance to a kick. Similarly, a NE–SW crack in the surface in the drill site may be evidence of an underground blowout. The well may have suffered an underground blowout that resulted in a surface breach.

=== Earthquake-induced fault reactivation ===
The relatively close timing of the Yogyakarta earthquake, the problems of mud loss and kick in the well, and the creation of the mud volcano continue to interest geoscientists. Experts from Norway, Russia, France, and Indonesia have suggested that the shaking caused by the earthquake may have induced liquefaction of the underlying Kalibeng clay layer, releasing gases and causing a pressure change large enough to reactivate a major fault nearby (the Watukosek fault), creating a mudflow path that caused Lusi.

They have identified more than ten naturally triggered mud volcanoes in the province of East Java, with at least five near the Watukosek fault system, confirming that the region is prone to mud volcanism. They also showed that surface cracks surrounding Lusi predominantly run NE–SW, the direction of the Watukosek fault. Increased seep activity in the mud volcanoes along the Watukosek fault coincided with the 27 May 2006 seismic event. A major fault system may have been reactivated, resulting in the formation of a mud volcano.

=== Geothermal process ===
Lusi is near the arc of volcanoes in Indonesia where geothermal activity is abundant. The nearest volcano, the Arjuno-Welirang complex, is less than 15 km away. The hot mud suggests that some form of geothermal heating from the nearby magmatic volcano may have been involved.

== Investigations ==
=== Cause ===
Controversy exists around what triggered the eruption and whether the event was a natural disaster or not. According to PT Lapindo Brantas, it was the 2006 Yogyakarta earthquake that triggered the mudflow eruption, and not their drilling activities. Two days before the mud eruption, an earthquake of moment magnitude 6.3 hit the south coast of Central Java and Yogyakarta provinces, killing 6,234 people and leaving 1.5 million homeless. At a hearing before parliamentary members, senior executives of PT Lapindo Brantas argued that the earthquake was so powerful that it had reactivated previously inactive faults and also created deep underground fractures, allowing the mud to breach the surface, and that their company presence was coincidental, which should exempt them from paying compensation damage to the victims. If the cause of the incident was determined to be natural, then the government of Indonesia had the responsibility to cover the damage instead. This argument was also recurrently echoed by Aburizal Bakrie, the Indonesian Minister of Welfare at that time, whose family firm controls PT Lapindo Brantas.

However, a UK team of geologists downplayed Lapindo's argument and concluded "...that the earthquake that occurred two days earlier is coincidental". While it could have generated a new fracture system and weakened strata surrounding the Banjar-Panji 1 well, it could not have been the cause of the formation of the hydraulic fracture that created the main vent 200 m (660 ft) away from the borehole. Additionally there was no other mud volcano reported on Java after the earthquake, and the main drilling site is 300 km (190 mi) away from the earthquake's epicenter. The intensity of the earthquake at the drilling site was estimated to have been only magnitude 2 on the Richter scale, the same effect as a heavy truck passing over the area.

In June 2008, a report released by British, American, Indonesian, and Australian scientists concluded that the volcano was not a natural disaster but the result of oil and gas drilling.

=== Legal case ===
On 5 June 2006, MedcoEnergi (one partner company in the Brantas PSC area) sent a letter to PT Lapindo Brantas, accusing them of breaching safety procedures during the drilling process. The letter further attributes "gross negligence" to the operator company for not equipping the well bore with steel safety encasing. Soon afterwards, then-vice president Jusuf Kalla announced that PT Lapindo Brantas and the owner, the Bakrie Group, would have to compensate thousands of victims affected by the mudflows. Criminal investigations were then initiated against several senior executives of the company, since the drilling operation had put the lives of local people at risk.

Aburizal Bakrie's Bakrie Group, one of the owners of PT Lapindo Brantas, tried to distance themselves from the Lusi incident. Afraid of being held liable for the disaster, Bakrie Group announced that they would sell PT Lapindo Brantas to an offshore company for only $2, but Indonesia's Capital Markets Supervisory Agency blocked the sale. A further attempt was made to sell to a company registered in the Virgin Islands, the Freehold Group, for US$1 million, which was also halted by the government supervisory agency for being invalid. Lapindo Brantas was asked to pay about 2.5 trillion rupiah (about US$276.8 million) to the victims and about 1.3 trillion rupiah as additional costs to stop the flow. Some analysts predicted that the Bakrie Group would pursue bankruptcy to avoid the cost of cleanup, which could amount to US$1 billion.

On 15 August 2006, the East Java police seized the Banjar-Panji 1 well to secure it for the court case. The Indonesian environmental watchdog WALHI, meanwhile, had filed a lawsuit against PT Lapindo Brantas, President Susilo Bambang Yudhoyono, the Indonesian Minister of Energy, the Indonesian Minister of Environmental Affairs, and local officials.

After investigations by independent experts, the police concluded that the mudflow was an "underground blowout" triggered by the drilling activity. It was further noted that steel-encasing lining had not been used, which could have prevented the disaster. Thirteen Lapindo Brantas executives and engineers faced twelve charges of violating Indonesian laws.

== Status ==
=== 2008 ===
As of 30 October 2008, the mud was flowing at a rate of 100,000 cubic metres (3,500,000 cu ft; 130,000 cu yd) per day. By mid-August 2011, it was being discharged at a rate of 10,000 m^{3} per day, with 15 bubbles around its gushing point.

One study found that the mud volcano was collapsing under its own weight, possibly beginning caldera formation. The researchers said the subsidence data could help determine how much of the local area would be affected. They used GPS and satellite data recorded between June 2006 and September 2007, showing that the area affected by Lusi had subsided by between 0.5 and 14.5 metres (1.6 and 47.6 ft) per year. The scientists found that if Lusi continued to erupt for 3–10 years at the rates measured during 2007, then the central part of the volcano could subside by between 44 and 146 m (144 and 479 ft). They proposed that the subsidence was due to the weight of mud and collapse of rock strata caused by the excavation of mud from beneath the surface. Their study also found that while some parts of Lusi were subsiding, others were rising, suggesting that the Watukosek fault system had been reactivated by the eruption.

A study by a group of Indonesian geoscientists, led by Bambang Istadi, projected the area affected by the mudflow over a ten-year period. The model simulated the mudflow and its likely outcome in order to find safe places to relocate people and affected infrastructure.

After new hot gas flows began to appear, workers started relocating families, and some sustained injuries, including severe burns. In Siring Barat, 319 families were displaced, and in Kelurahan Jatirejo, 262 families were expected to be affected. Protesters took to the streets, demanding compensation, which added more delays to the already stressed detour road for Jalan Raya Porong and the Porong-Gempol toll road.

A local official, Saiful Ilah, signed a statement announcing that "The government is going to defend the people of Siring." Protests subsequently came to an end, and traffic flow returned to normal an hour later.

==== Stakeholder exit ====
The Australian oil and gas company Santos Limited was a minority partner in the venture until 2008. In December 2008, the company sold its 18% stake in the project to Minarak Labuan, the owner of Lapindo Brantas Inc. Labuan also received a payment from Santos of $US22.5 million ($A33.9 million) "to support long-term mud management efforts". The amount was covered by existing provisions for costs relating to the incident. Santos had provisioned for $US79 million ($A119.3 million) in costs associated with the disaster. The company had stated in June 2006 that it maintained "appropriate insurance coverage for these types of occurrences".

=== 2010 ===
New mudflows began in April 2010, this time on Porong Highway, which is the main road linking Surabaya with Probolinggo, despite roadway thickening and strengthening. A new highway, planned to replace the existing one, was held up by land acquisition issues. The main railway, which runs by the area, was in danger of explosions due to seepage of methane, and ignition could occur from something as simple as a tossed cigarette.

As of June 2009, residents had received less than 20% of the suggested compensation for the disaster. By mid-2010, reimbursement payments had not been fully settled, and legal action against the company had stalled.

=== 2013 ===
In late 2013, international scientists who had been monitoring the situation were reported as saying that the eruption of mud at Sidoarjo was falling away quite rapidly and that there were indications that the eruption might cease by perhaps 2017, much earlier than previously estimated. They noted that the system was losing pressure quite rapidly and had begun pulsing rather than maintaining a steady flow. The pulsing pattern, it was believed, was a clear sign that the geological forces driving the eruption were subsiding.

=== 2016 ===
By 2016, the mudflow continued, with tens of thousands of liters of mud contaminated with heavy metals leaking into rivers. The site had also become of interest to "disaster tourists". By then, payments had been made to about 3,300 households, representing 95% of those affected, by the Sidoarjo Mudflow Handling Agency, a government-backed taskforce.

=== 2017–present ===
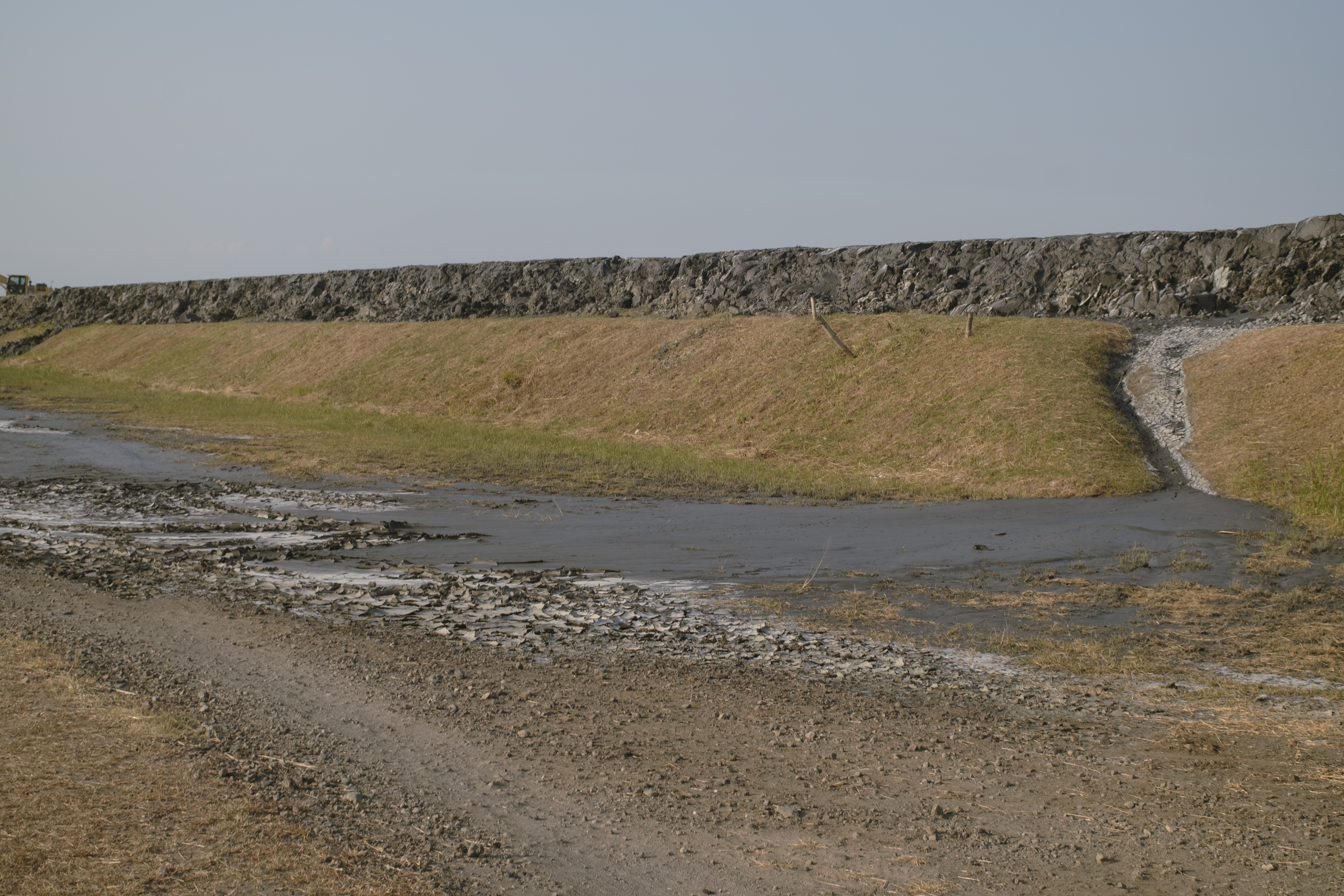
Site of the July 2026 Sidoarjo mud flow breach

In 2017, the Indonesian government dissolved the Sidoarjo Mudflow Mitigation Agency, which had been operating since 2006 to manage mudflow disaster response operations, transferring all duties to the Ministry of Public Works. The ministry took charge of ongoing mitigation operations, which involved preserving mud containment levees and operating drainage and pumping facilities, and observing the contaminated region.

The government programs that operate to evaluate environmental dangers and protect essential public assets have worked to oversee such site operations. These include conducting surveillance, focusing on ground deformation and gas emissions while protecting the area from mud flow through barrier systems and directing it into specially designed channels that link directly to the Porong River. The area is maintained under supervision, and the environment around the mud flow area has been checked for pollution and land subsidence, which continues to happen at lower rates than during the first years of the disaster.

In July 2026, the barrier holding back mudflow from the Surabaya-Malang through-street and railway suffered cracks that allowed mud to seep through. This sparked discussions of rerouting the rail line entirely as a preventative step.

=== Revived controversy ===
Out of the three hypotheses on the cause of the Lusi mud volcano, the hydro-fracturing hypothesis appeared to be the one most debated. On 23 October 2008, a public relations agency in London, acting for one of the oil well's owners, started to publicise what it described as "new facts" on the origin of the mud volcano, which were subsequently presented at an American Association of Petroleum Geologists conference in Cape Town, South Africa, on 28 October 2008. The assertion of geologists and drillers from Energi Mega Persada was that "At a recent Geological Society of London Conference, we provided authoritative new facts that make it absolutely clear that drilling could not have been the trigger of LUSI." The data was published in 2009 in the Journal of Marine and Petroleum Geology.

After hearing revised arguments from both sides regarding the cause of the mud volcano, the vast majority of the conference audience present (consisting of AAPG oil and gas professionals) voted in favor of the view that Lusi had been induced by drilling. On the basis of the arguments presented, 42 out of the 74 scientists came to the conclusion that drilling was entirely responsible, while 13 felt that a combination of drilling and earthquake activity was to blame. Only 3 thought that the earthquake was solely responsible, and 16 geoscientists believed that the evidence was inconclusive.

The report of the debate and its outcomes was published in AAPG Explorer Magazine. The article stated that the voting process was a decision by the moderator and only reflected opinions of a group of individuals in the session room at that time, and that it was in no way endorsed by the association. It further cautioned readers not to consider the voting result as constituting scientific validation.

On the possible trigger of the Lusi mud volcano, a group of geologists and drilling engineers from the oil company countered the hydro fracturing hypothesis. They suggested that analysis based on well data showed that the well was safe, and pressure in the well bore was below critical level, concluding that it was therefore unlikely that the well was fractured as charged. Their paper also published data and well information for the first time to the scientific community, as opinions and technical papers up to that time lacked accurate well data and relied on a number of assumptions. However, subsequent studies have refuted the claims made in this paper and have highlighted that a number of claims made in it were directly contradicted by the oil company's own well-site reports and documents.

In February 2010, a group led by experts from Britain's Durham University said the new clues bolstered suspicions that the catastrophe was caused by human error. In the journal Marine and Petroleum Geology, Richard Davies of the Centre for Research into Earth Energy Systems said that drillers, looking for gas nearby, had made a series of mistakes, including overestimating the pressure the well could tolerate, and had not placed protective casing around a section of open well. Then, after failing to find any gas, they hauled the drill out while the hole was extremely unstable. By withdrawing the drill, they exposed the wellhole to a "kick" from pressurized water and gas from surrounding rock formations. The result was a volcano-like inflow that the drillers tried in vain to stop.

In the same journal, a group of geologists and drilling engineers refuted the allegation, showing that the maximum pressure of the "kick" was too low to fracture the rock formation. They further stated that the model developed by Davies was much too simplistic and failed to consider the entire available dataset and other relevant information in its analysis.

A 2010 technical paper related to the debate presented a balanced overview on the anatomy of the Lusi mud volcanic system, with particular emphasis on critical uncertainties and their influence on the disaster.

In July 2013, Lupi et al. proposed that the Lusi mud eruption was the result of a natural event, triggered by the Yogyakarta earthquake two days before. As a result, seismic waves were geometrically focused at the Lusi site, leading to mud and CO_{2} generation and a reactivation of the local Watukosek Fault. According to their hypothesis, the fault is linked to a deep hydrothermal system that fed the eruption. This hypothesis was heavily criticized due to the original models containing a major error. The original study proposed that a "high velocity layer" focussed earthquake waves, amplifying the effect of the earthquake. However, the "high velocity layer" has since been demonstrated to be a non-existent artefact caused by velocity measurements of the steel casing in the Banjar Panji-1 well, which resulted in the original models assuming that a "layer of steel" existed underground. Lupi et al. have acknowledged this error but argued in a corrigendum that it made no difference to their results, as they proposed in a new velocity model, arguing for the existence of a different high velocity layer at the same depth. There still remains significant doubt about this revised model, as another study indicated that there was no geological or geophysical evidence for any significant domed high-velocity layer at the mudflow location that would reflect and amplify seismic waves. A study by Rudolph et al. in 2015 replicated the seismic wave propagation modelling at the Sidoarjo mudflow location using the two competing velocity models and proposed that the modelling conducted by Lupi et al. exaggerates the effect of the Yogyakarta earthquake at the mudflow location.

In February 2015, Tingay et al. compiled a new and detailed chronology of the drilling of the Banjar Panji-1 well and the first days of the Sidoarjo mudflow, based on daily drilling and well-site reports. It was the first document to highlight the numerous inconsistencies between papers and reports. The new chronology pointed out that a number of key claims made by Lapindo Brantas were contradicted by their own daily drilling and well-site reports. These include the claims that losses occurred seven minutes after the earthquake (when drilling data actually suggests losses preceded the earthquake); that losses at total depth occurred immediately after major aftershocks (whereas total losses occurred over 1.5 hours after any aftershocks); that losses at total depth were cured (whereas there are multiple reports of ongoing losses over an 18-hour period whilst pulling out of the hole); that the drilling kick was killed within 3 hours (whereas drillpipe pressures fluctuate repeatedly for 24 hours after the kick, indicating ongoing cycles of downhole influx and losses); that there is no evidence for downhole losses (which would indicate fracturing or fault reactivation) during the drilling kick (yet mud engineer reports state that over 300 barrels of drilling mud was lost downhole during the kick) and; that there was no connection between the mudflow and the wellbore (yet daily drilling reports state that mudflow activity noticeably decreased when dense drilling mud was pumped down the well during attempts to stop the mudflow).

In June 2015, Tingay et al. used geochemical data recorded during the drilling of the Banjar Panji-1 well to test the hypothesis that the Yogyakarta earthquake triggered liquefaction and fault reactivation at the mudflow location. Liquefaction of the Kalibeng clays is a crucial component of the earthquake-induced fault reactivation hypothesis, as this process releases gases and fluids that cause the pressure changes proposed to have induced fault slip. The drilling geochemical data measured gases produced by subsurface rocks in the Banjar Panji-1 in the weeks before the Yogyakarta earthquake and the days afterwards and provided the first data to directly examine downhole effects of the earthquake. It showed no increased release of gases in the days following the Yogyakarta earthquake, indicating that liquefaction and associated gas-related pressure changes were not triggered by it. The data also showed that gas increases from downhole formations only commenced when the drilling kick occurred, providing further support that the mudflow was triggered by drilling activities.

== Gallery ==
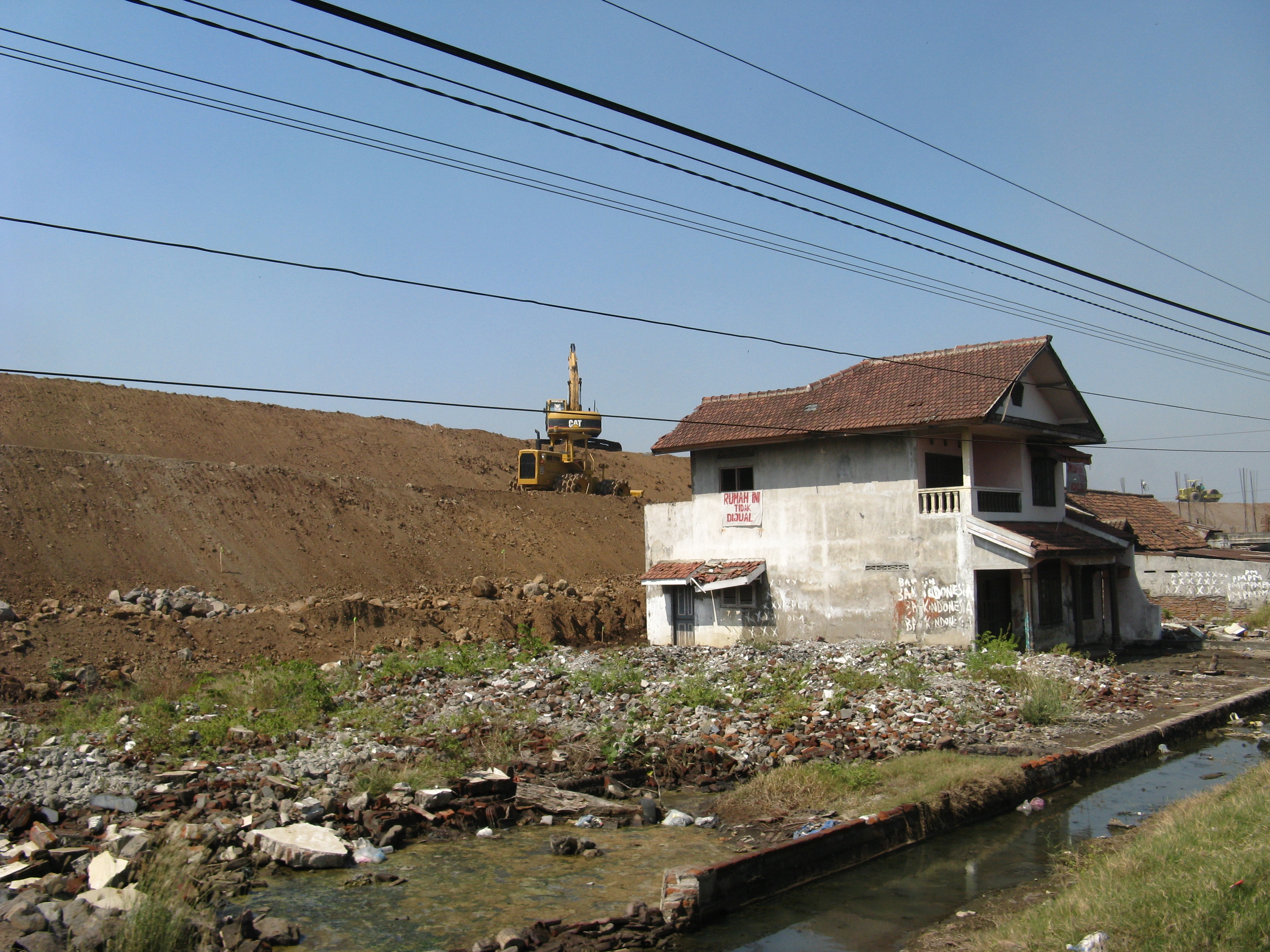
Area of destruction, with earth embankment in background

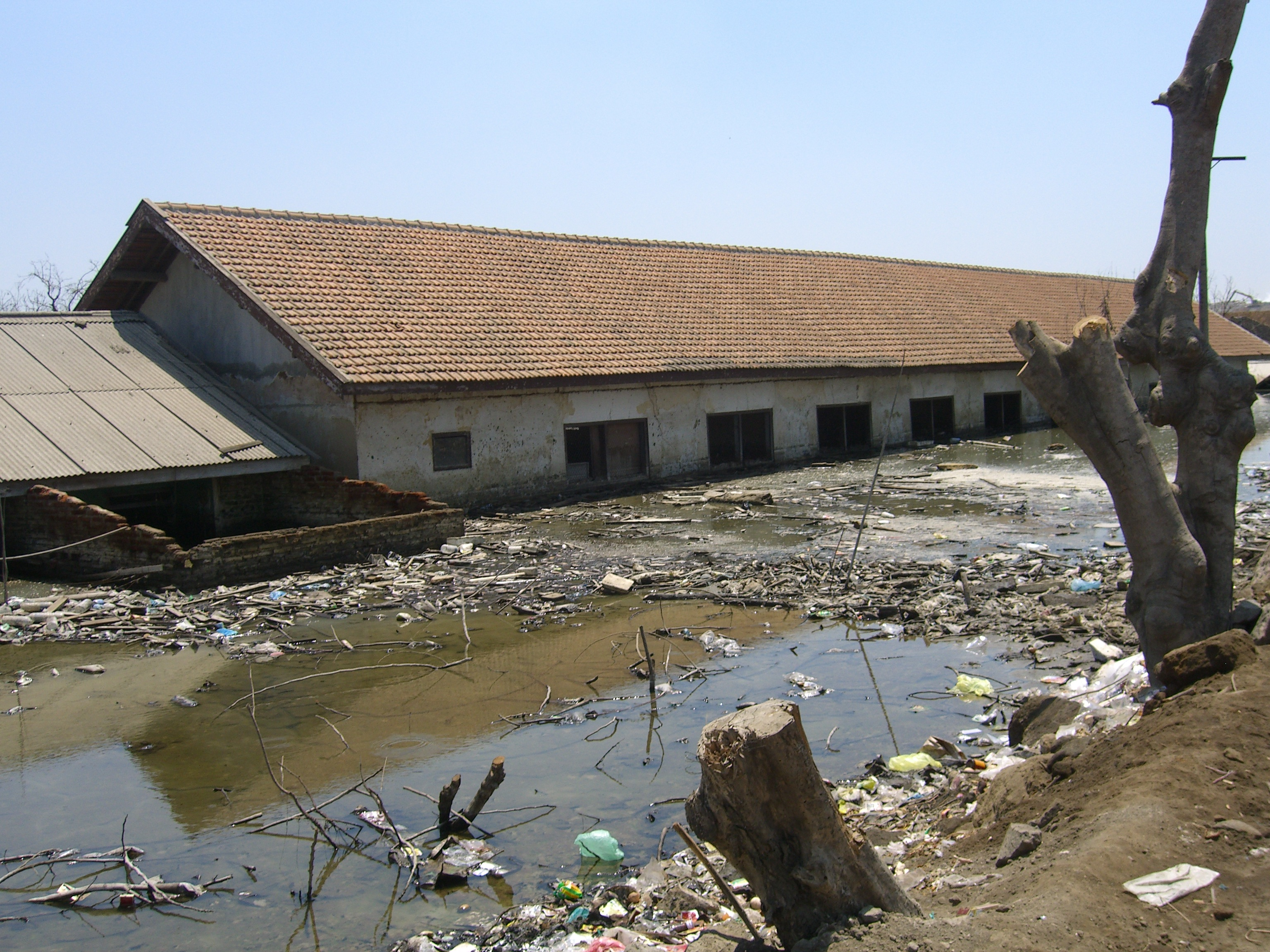
Submerged school

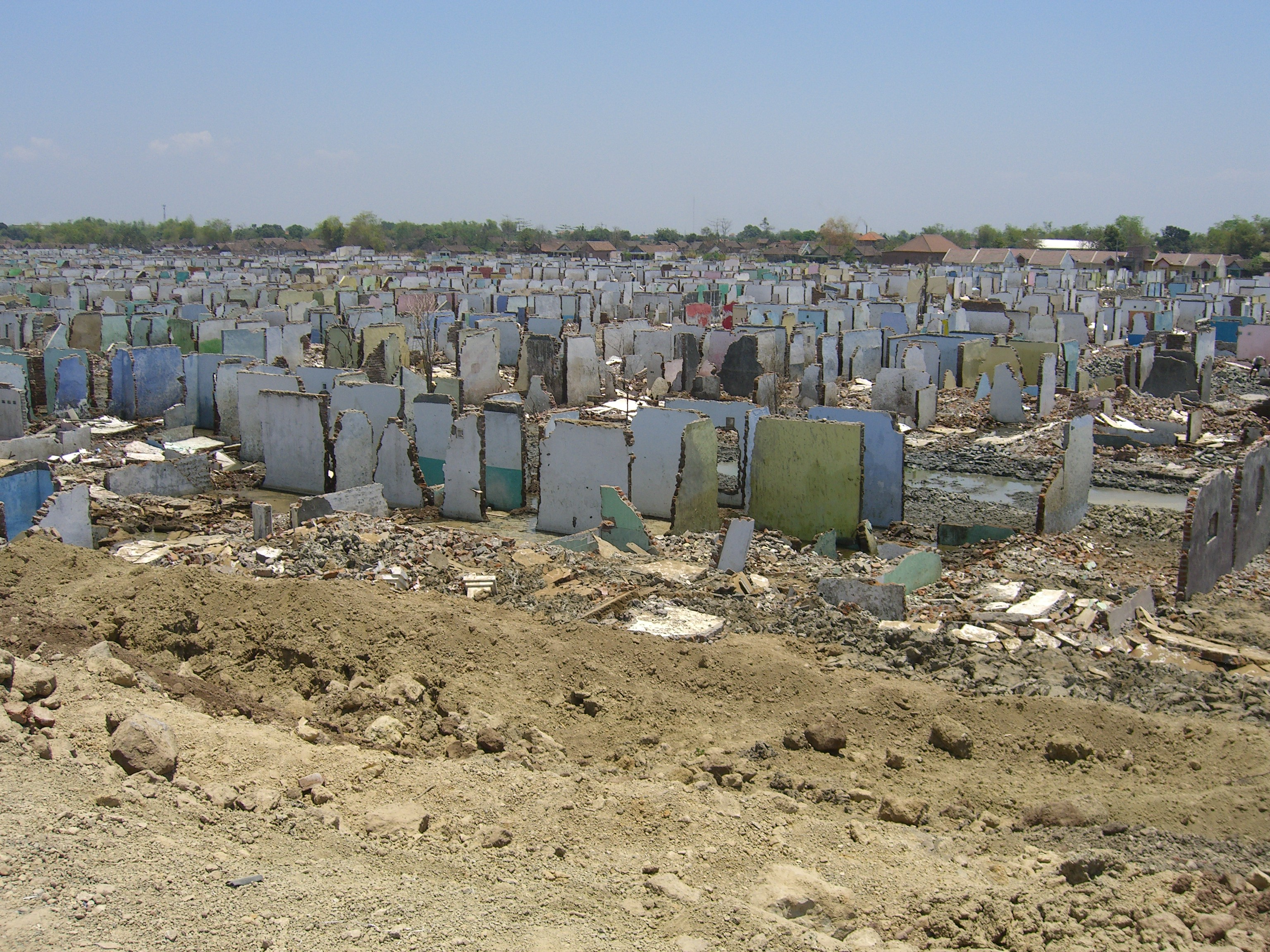
Area of Sidoarjo destroyed by mudflow

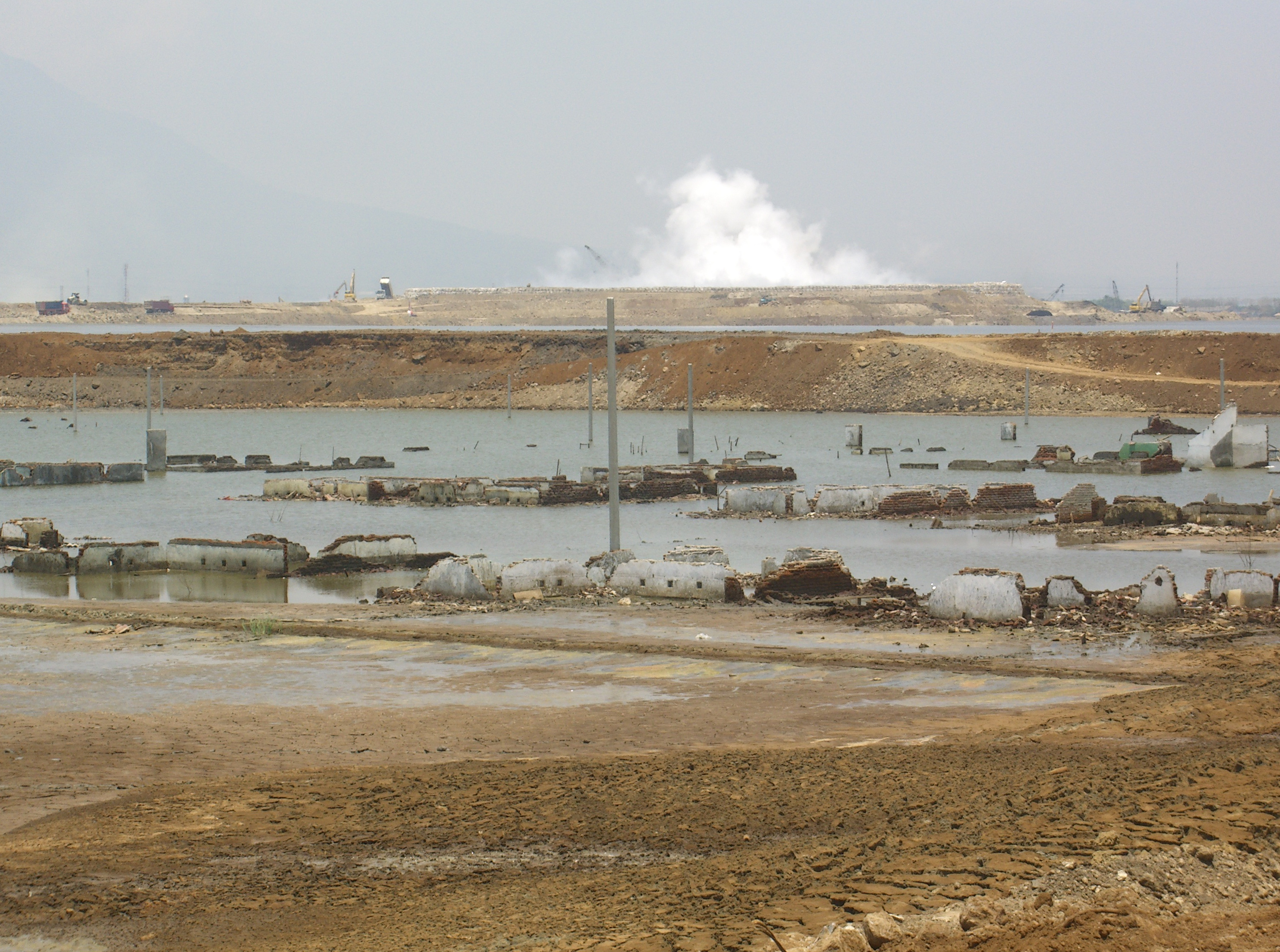
Scale of the mud hole, with efforts to contain it using embankments

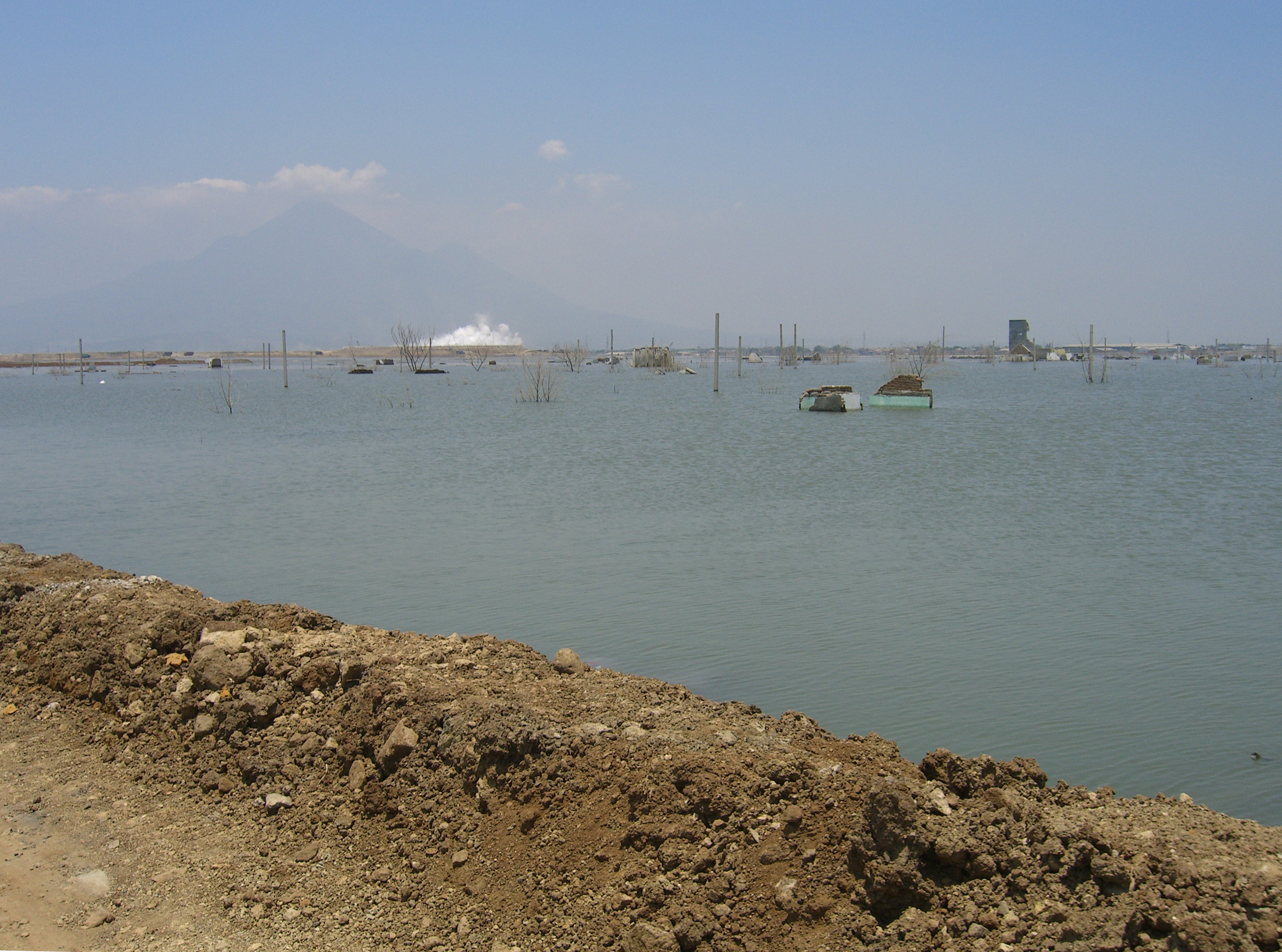
Lake created by mud, with steaming mudflow in background

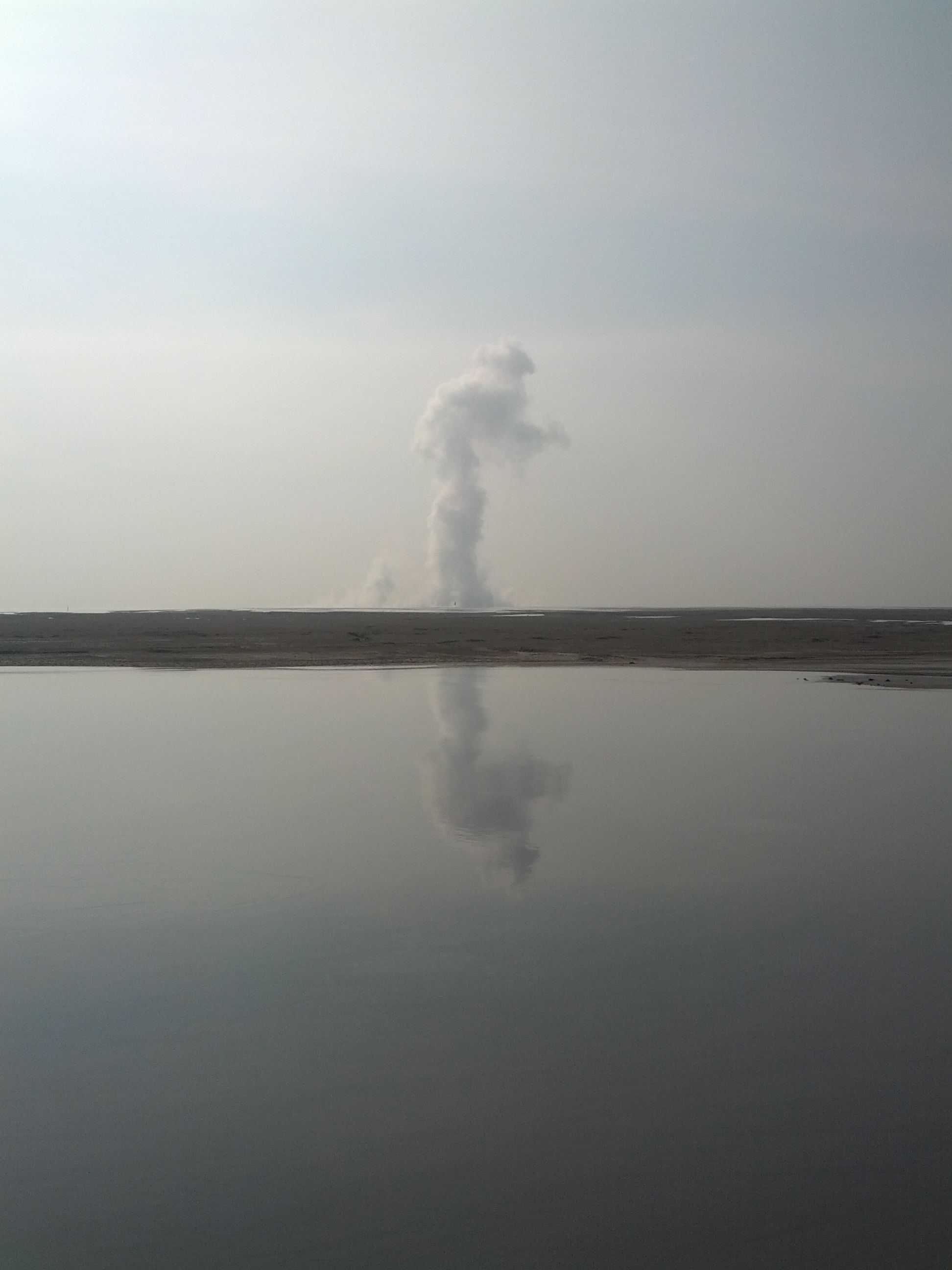
Eruption gas plume

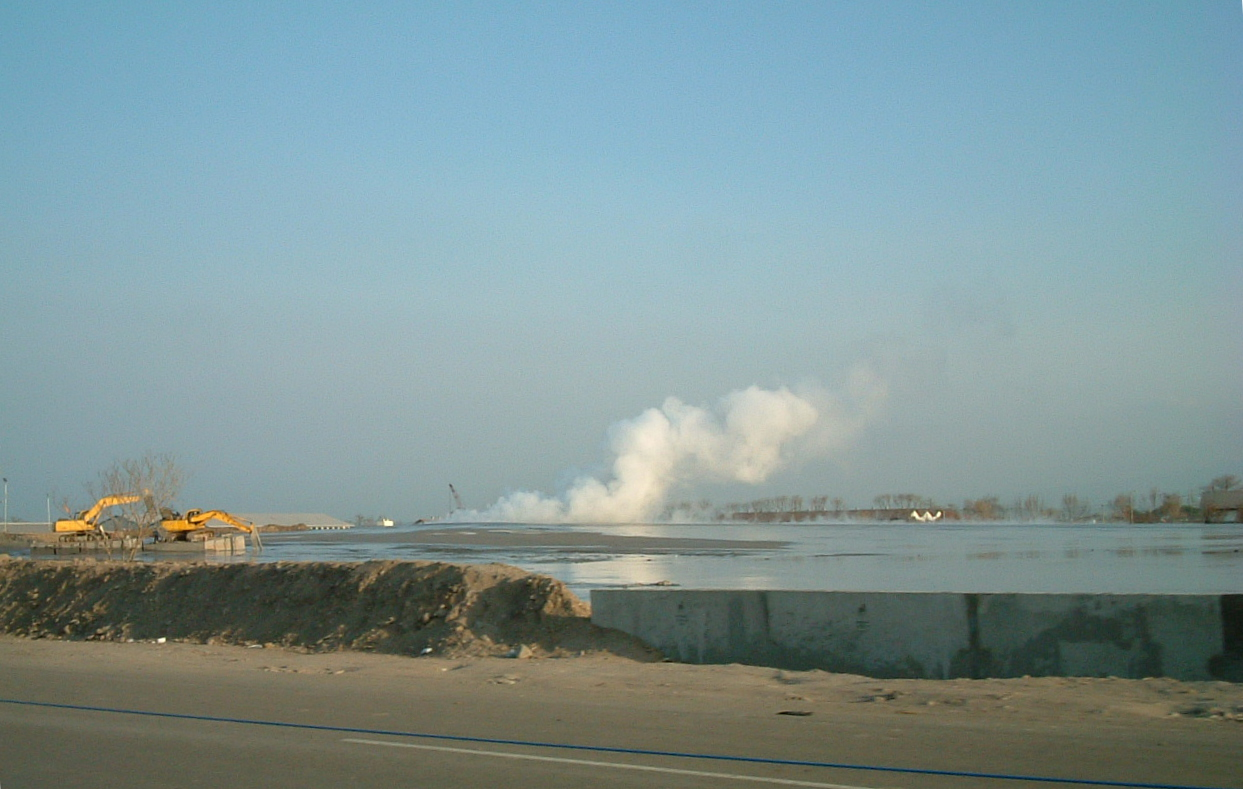
Gas plumes next to excavators working

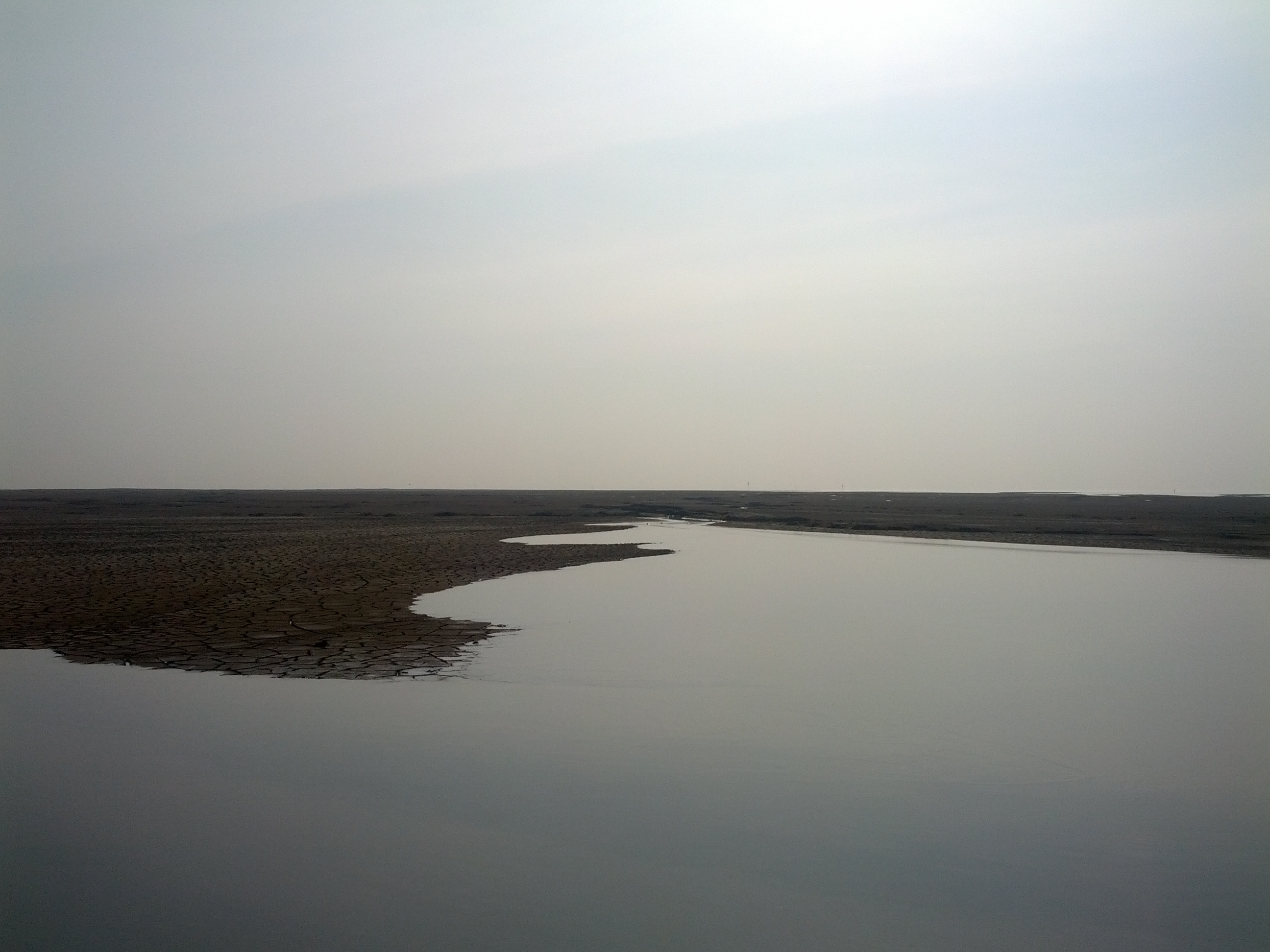
View of mud expanse and flooded area after rainfall

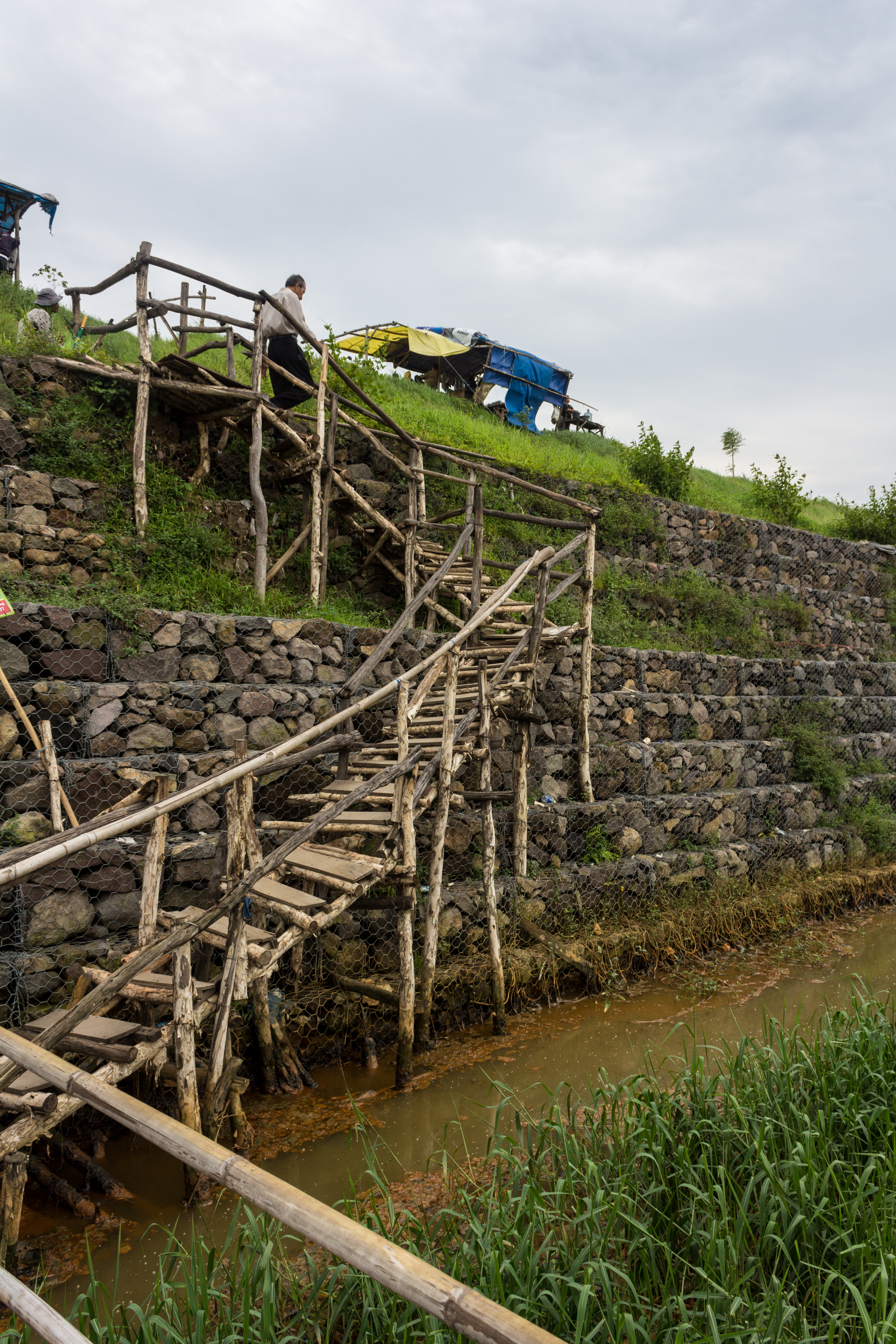
Staircase to viewing area
