= Aburizal Bakrie =

Indonesian politician and businessman

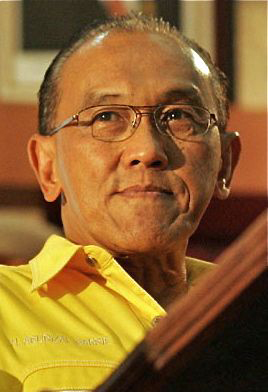
- Bakrie in March 2011

9th General Chairman of Golkar
- In office 9 October 2009 – 17 May 2016
- Preceded by: Jusuf Kalla
- Succeeded by: Setya Novanto

Personal details
- Born: 15 November 1946 (age 80) Jakarta, Indonesia
- Party: Golkar
- Spouse: Tatty Murnitriati
- Children: 3, including Anindya Bakrie
- Education: Bandung Institute of Technology

Aburizal Bakrie (born 15 November 1946) is an Indonesian politician and a prominent businessman, widely recognized for his success with the Bakrie Group conglomerate. From 2004 to 2005, Bakrie served as Indonesia's Coordinating Minister for the Economy. He then held the position of Coordinating Minister for People's Welfare from 2005 to 2009. Bakrie served as the Chairman of the Golkar Party from 2009 to late 2014 and resumed the chairmanship in May 2015.

He is widely known for his company's involvement in the Sidoarjo mudflow disaster, which has been linked to Energi Mega Persada.

== Early life and education ==
Aburizal Bakrie was born on 15 November 1946 in Jakarta. His father, Achmad Bakrie, was the founder of Bakrie & Brothers and the Bakrie Group, while his mother was Roosniah Nasution. Bakrie is the eldest of four siblings, with two brothers, Nirwan Bakrie and Indra Usmansyah Bakrie, and a sister, Roosniah Odi Bakrie. He attended the Bandung Institute of Technology, where he earned a degree in electrical engineering in 1973.

== Career ==
=== Business career ===
In 1972, Aburizal Bakrie joined PT Bakrie & Brothers Tbk, now known as the Bakrie Group, a conglomerate founded by his late father, Achmad Bakrie. The company thrived alongside Indonesia's economy during the Soeharto presidency. The Bakrie Group operates in various sectors, including agriculture, real estate, trade, shipping, banking, insurance, media, manufacturing, construction, and mining.

As the eldest of four siblings, Bakrie served as the chairman of the family enterprise from 1999 to 2004. During the Asian economic crisis of 1998, he faced significant challenges in maintaining control of the conglomerate but successfully emerged victorious after a refinancing process in 2000.

=== Public offices ===
From 1991 to 1995, Aburizal Bakrie served two consecutive terms as the President of the ASEAN Business Forum. Additionally, from 1994 to 2004, he held two consecutive terms as the President of the Indonesian Chamber of Commerce and Industry (KADIN). As a member of the Golkar Party, Bakrie also pursued a bid to become Golkar's presidential candidate in 2004.

==== Coordinating Minister for Economy ====
In 2004, Aburizal Bakrie retired from PT Bakrie & Brothers Tbk before being appointed Coordinating Minister for the Economy by President Susilo Bambang Yudhoyono. His appointment was initially met with some reservations. Shortly after joining Yudhoyono's cabinet, Bakrie introduced a new government policy aimed at reducing the poverty rate in Indonesia by 3%. This policy involved reducing fuel subsidies and redirecting financial support to approximately 6 million people.

Bakrie advocated for a gradual increase in fuel prices to prevent the subsidies from overwhelming the national budget and to align domestic fuel costs with international levels. By October 2005, after two price hikes, fuel prices had risen by 126%. The move was positively received by Standard & Poor's, which regarded it as a significant step toward alleviating immediate fiscal pressures and improving Indonesia's external balance.

To address Indonesia's declining crude oil output, Aburizal Bakrie intervened to resolve a longstanding standoff between ExxonMobil Corporation and PT Pertamina. The two companies had been at odds for years over operational and profit-sharing issues related to the Cepu Block oil fields project, which marked one of Indonesia's largest oil discoveries on Java in decades.

The previous year, Bakrie had pledged that the new government was committed to resolving the Cepu dispute and other conflicts involving international companies. This move aimed to demonstrate the government's dedication to improving Indonesia's investment climate.

==== Coordinating Minister for People's Welfare ====
Following a cabinet reshuffle in 2005, Aburizal Bakrie was appointed Coordinating Minister for People's Welfare. In May 2008, he announced a direct cash relief program worth $1.52 billion, which aimed to support nearly 19 million low-income households and mitigate the impact of rising fuel prices.

==== Chairman of Golkar party ====
In 2009, Aburizal Bakrie was elected Chairman of the Golkar Party during the Golkar Party Congress held in Pekanbaru, Riau, Indonesia, defeating Surya Paloh, Yuddy Chrisnandi, and Hutomo Mandala Putra. In May 2010, he successfully established a majority parliamentary coalition with President Susilo Bambang Yudhoyono's party and was elected its leader.

=== Sidoardjo mudflow disaster ===
Aburizal Bakrie's name has been associated with the Sidoarjo mudflow, which erupted on 29 May 2006 in Sidoarjo, East Java, causing severe environmental devastation and loss of life. Scientists remain divided on the cause of the disaster. One group attributes it to a natural occurrence, citing a 6.3-magnitude earthquake that struck near Yogyakarta two days earlier. However, another group, along with the government, has confirmed that the drilling practices of PT Lapindo Brantas, a company in which Bakrie's family held a controlling stake, were responsible for triggering the mudflow. Media coverage of the event has been mixed.

Although environmental groups urged the Indonesian government to revoke PT Lapindo Brantas' drilling license due to environmental mismanagement, a three-year police investigation into the incident ended with the case being dropped. According to the Jakarta Globe, Satya Widya Yudha, a Golkar legislator, and Effendi Simbolon, a deputy chairman of the House of Representatives Commission VII from the PDI-P, largely supported Bakrie's family, characterizing the event as a natural disaster and expressing satisfaction with the compensation process. They also denounced the "politicization" of the issue. In contrast, Eva Kusuma Sundari, a PDI-P legislator whose property was affected by the disaster, accused Lapindo and the government of failing to meet their obligations in compensating the victims, calling them "insensitive and unresponsive."

A 2013 report indicated that for nearly seven years, the mudflow had been devastating the livelihoods of Porong residents in particular and the Sidoarjo economy as a whole. The mudflow had also submerged more than 6,000 hectares of land, displaced 39,700 people, and inundated three subdistricts, 12 villages, 11,241 buildings, and 362 hectares of rice fields.

=== Presidential elections 2014 ===
In the fall of 2010, media coverage began to suggest that Aburizal Bakrie was aiming to become the Golkar Party's presidential candidate in Indonesia's 2014 presidential election. Since then, Bakrie has repeatedly expressed his desire to be nominated as Golkar's candidate. Media reports also indicated that the Golkar Party had already started searching for a running mate to join Bakrie, with names such as Sri Sultan Hamengkubuwana X, the current Governor of Yogyakarta, Pramono Anung, the Secretary General of the Indonesian Democratic Party and Deputy House Speaker, Dahlan Iskan, the Minister of State Enterprises, and Edhie Baskoro Yudhoyono, the youngest son of Indonesia's President Susilo Bambang Yudhoyono, being mentioned.

Bakrie's early nomination was met with significant criticism, as some party members favored holding a caucus to first determine the process for selecting the party's candidate. The head of the Golkar Party advisory board, Akbar Tanjung, criticized the decision in October 2011, when the party congress chose Bakrie as the preferred candidate without allowing other potential nominees. Tanjung called the process "undemocratic" and argued that it denied other members the right to pursue the nomination. This criticism was echoed by other members, including some at the regional level.

Bakrie responded by dismissing the criticism as "political attacks," with The Jakarta Post describing him as "shrugging off" the objections. However, others pointed out the importance of settling on a presidential candidate well ahead of the 2014 election, given Indonesia's vast geographic size, its sprawling provinces, and a population expected to reach 248 million that year.

On 30 June 2012, at Golkar's Leadership Meeting in Bogor, Bakrie was declared the party's presidential candidate for the 2014 election. In his acceptance speech, Bakrie said, "Pleading for guidance from God Almighty, the faith to build a more developed Indonesia, a strong will, and support from all of you, with humility I officially and openly accept this nomination."

To end speculation about a possible running mate for Bakrie, Golkar's Deputy Chairman Agung Laksono announced that the selection of a vice-presidential candidate would be postponed until 2013.

Recent opinion polls show Bakrie trailing behind other presidential hopefuls, including former general Prabowo Subianto, Chief Patron of the Great Indonesia Movement Party, and former President Megawati Sukarnoputri, the daughter of Indonesia's first President, Sukarno.

== See also ==
- United Indonesia Cabinet

Business positions
Preceded by Achmad Bakrie	Chairman of Bakrie and Brothers; 1994–2004	Succeeded by Nirwan Bakrie
Political offices
Preceded by Sotion Ardjanggi	President of Indonesian Chamber of Commerce; 1994–2004	Succeeded by Mohamad Suleman Hidayat
Preceded by Dorodjatun Kuntjoro-Jakti	Coordinating Minister for the Economy; 2004–2005	Succeeded by Boediono
Preceded by Alwi Shihab	Coordinating Minister for People's Welfare; 2005–2009	Succeeded by Agung Laksono
Party political offices
Preceded by Jusuf Kalla	Leader of Golkar; 2009–2017	Succeeded by Airlangga Hartarto
