= Jusuf Kalla =

Vice President of Indonesia (2004–2009; 2014–2019)

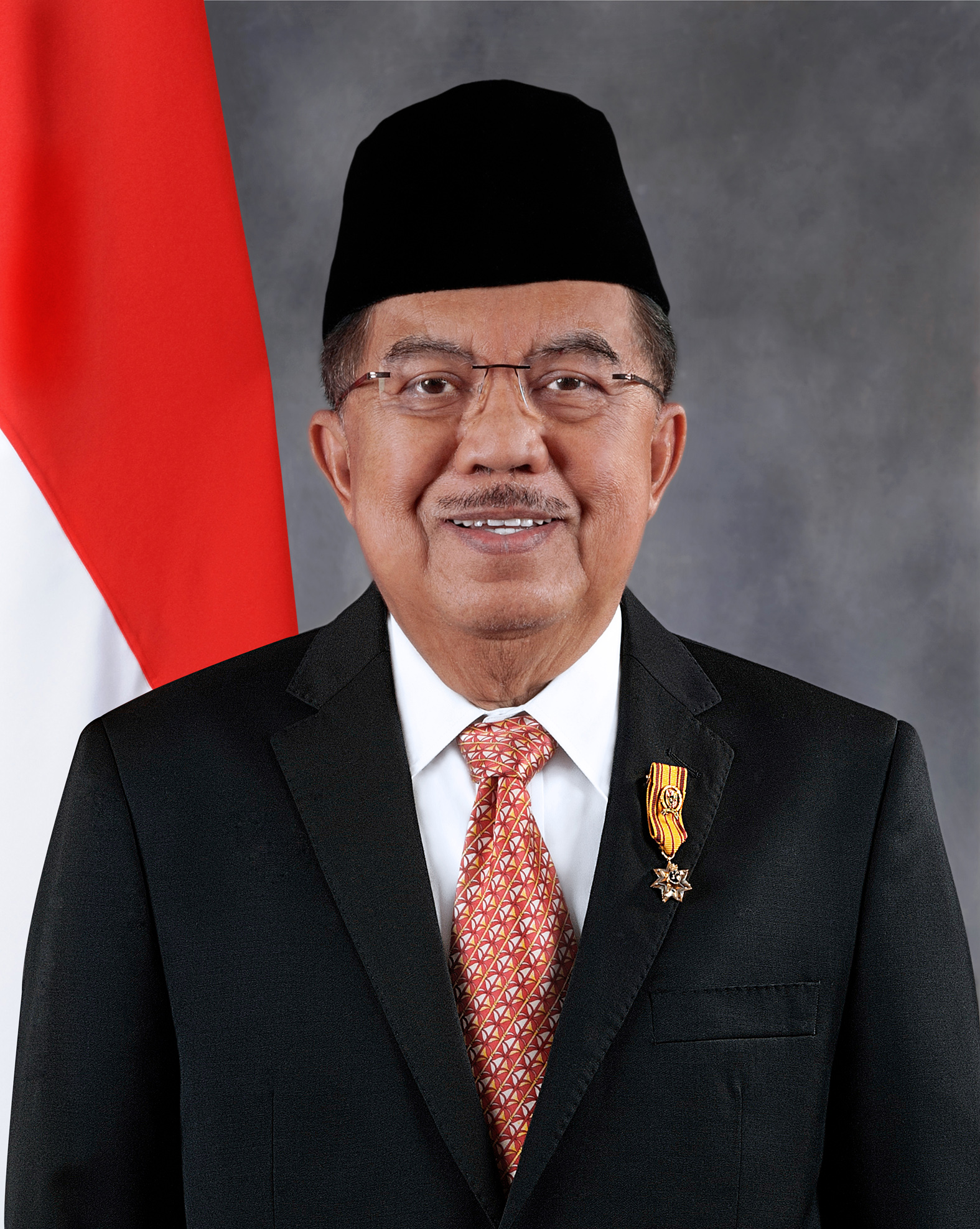
- Official portrait, 2014

10th & 12th Vice President of Indonesia
- In office 20 October 2014 – 20 October 2019
- President: Joko Widodo
- Preceded by: Boediono
- Succeeded by: Ma'ruf Amin
- In office 20 October 2004 – 20 October 2009
- President: Susilo Bambang Yudhoyono
- Preceded by: Hamzah Haz
- Succeeded by: Boediono

12th Chairman of Indonesian Red Cross Society
- Incumbent
- Assumed office 22 December 2009
- Preceded by: Mar'ie Muhammad

8th General Chairman of Golkar Party
- In office 19 December 2004 – 9 October 2009
- Secretary-General: Sumarsono
- Preceded by: Akbar Tandjung
- Succeeded by: Aburizal Bakrie

12th Coordinating Minister for People's Welfare
- In office 10 August 2001 – 22 April 2004
- President: Megawati Sukarnoputri
- Preceded by: Basri Hasanuddin
- Succeeded by: Abdul Malik Fadjar (acting); Aburizal Bakrie

18th Minister of Industry and Trade
- In office 29 October 1999 – 24 August 2000
- President: Abdurrahman Wahid
- Preceded by: Rahardi Ramelan
- Succeeded by: Luhut Binsar Panjaitan

Member of the People's Consultative Assembly
- In office 1 October 1982 – 30 September 1999
- Parliamentary group: Regional Delegations

Member of the South Sulawesi Regional House of Representatives
- In office 1965–1968

Personal details
- Born: Muhammad Jusuf Kalla; 15 May 1942 (age 84) Watampone, Japanese East Indies
- Party: Golkar
- Spouse: Mufidah Mi'ad Saad (m. 1967)
- Education: Hasanuddin University (Drs.); European Institute of Business Administration (MBA)
- Occupation: Politician; businessperson
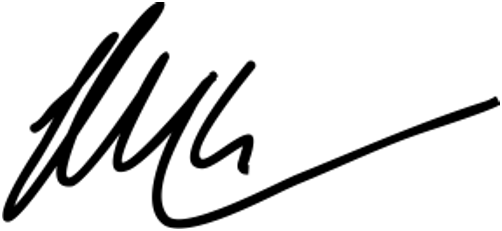
- Signature

Muhammad Jusuf Kalla (born 15 May 1942), commonly referred to by his initials JK, is an Indonesian politician and businessman who served as the 10th and 12th Vice President of Indonesia from 2004 to 2019, the only Vice President to serve two non-consecutive terms in office. He was the Golkar Party's presidential nominee in the 2009 presidential election. Before Kalla declared himself as the running mate for Joko Widodo in the 2014 presidential election, a 2012 poll placed his popularity among likely voters in the top three contenders for the presidency and ahead of his own party's nominee Aburizal Bakrie.

Kalla has served as the chairman of the Indonesian Red Cross Society since 2009.

== Early life ==
Kalla was born on 15 May 1942 in Watampone, which now sits in South Sulawesi. His parents were Hadji Kalla, a local businessman and Athirah, a woman who sold Buginese silk for a living. He was the second of 10 children.

After completing school, Kalla attended Hasanuddin University in Makassar. At the university, he became active in the Indonesian Student Action Front (KAMI), a student organization which supported General Suharto in his bid to gain power from President Sukarno. Kalla was elected as chair of South Sulawesi branch of KAMI. He showed interest in a political career, becoming a member of the Regional People's Representative Council (DPRD) and chairman of the Youth Division of Golkar when it was still organised under a Joint Secretariat (Sekretariat Bersama or Sekber) format.

== Businessman ==
In 1967 Kalla graduated from the Economics Faculty at Hasanuddin University. The economic situation was bleak at the time and his father, Hadji Kalla, considered shutting down the family business, NV Hadji Kalla. Instead, Kalla decided to take over the firm. Putting aside his political activities, in 1968 Kalla became CEO of NV Hadji Kalla while his father became chairman. In the beginning the business only had one employee and business was slow. Kalla's mother assisted by trading silk and running a small transportation business with three buses. Over time the business grew and became quite successful. NV Hadji Kalla expanded from the export-import trading business into other sectors (hotels, infrastructure construction, car dealerships, aerobridges, shipping, real estate, transportation, a shrimp farm, oil palm, and telecommunications). In addition to being CEO of NV Hadji Kalla, Kalla was also CEO of various subsidiaries of the firm. "NV Hadji Kalla" is now known as the Kalla Group and is one of the leading business groups in Indonesia, especially in Eastern Indonesia.

In 1977, Kalla graduated from INSEAD, in France.

== Affiliations ==
Aside from his business career, Kalla has been active in numerous well-known organizations. From 1979 to 1989, he was chairman of the Indonesian Economics Graduates Association (ISEI) in Makassar (known as Ujung Pandang at the time) and continues to be an adviser for ISEI. Kalla was extensively involved with the Chamber of Commerce and Industry (KADIN). From 1985 to 1998 he was chairman for KADIN in South Sulawesi and was coordinator for KADIN in eastern Indonesia. In addition, Kalla is on the board of trustees for three universities in Makassar. Kalla has contributed socially by building the Al Markaz Mosque and becoming chairman of its Islamic centre.

In 2015, the Jusuf Kalla School of Government at Muhammadiyah University of Yogyakarta was established, with the school being funded by Kalla.

Kalla is seen in The Act of Killing film praising Pancasila Youth and encouraging them to commit violence.

== Political career ==
=== Member of the People's Consultative Assembly ===
Kalla returned to active politics in 1987 when he was appointed to the People's Consultative Assembly (MPR) as a regional representative for South Sulawesi. He was re-appointed to the MPR in 1992, 1997, and 1999.

=== Wahid and Megawati presidency ===
When Kyai Haji Abdurrahman Wahid (often known as Gus Dur) was elected as president by the MPR in 1999, Kalla was included in the cabinet and became Minister of Industry and Trade. He had only been a minister for six months when in April 2000 Wahid removed him along with the Minister of State-Owned Enterprises. Wahid accused both Kalla and minister Laksamana of corruption, although he never produced evidence to support the charge, and Kalla denied the allegations.

In July 2001, at a special session of the MPR, President Gus Dur was dismissed from office. Vice President Megawati Sukarnoputri took over the presidency and included Kalla in her cabinet, appointing him to the senior post of Coordinating Minister of People's Welfare. Although it was not part of his ministerial brief, Kalla helped solve the inter-religious conflict in Poso on his native island of Sulawesi. Kalla facilitated the negotiation which resulted in the signing of the Malino II Accord on 20 December 2001 and an end to the conflict which had gone on for three years. Two months later, Kalla helped solve another conflict in Sulawesi. On 12 February 2002, Kalla, together with Coordinating Minister of Politics and Society Susilo Bambang Yudhoyono, managed to solve a similar conflict on Ambon and Molucca through a second Malino Declaration.

=== Road to vice presidency ===
Now a popular figure for assisting with the peace process in Sulawesi, Kalla considered putting himself forward as a candidate in the 2004 presidential elections. In August 2003 he announced his candidacy and enlisted as a participant in Golkar's 2004 Convention which would choose the Golkar candidate for president. As the months went by, however, Kalla came to be seen more as a vice-presidential candidate. He was expected to partner a Javanese presidential candidate and his non-Javanese background was seen as a means of attracting non-Javanese votes which a Javanese candidate might have trouble getting.

Just days before the Golkar national convention, Kalla decided to withdraw from running under the Golkar banner. Rather, he accepted the offer from the Democratic Party's (PD) Yudhoyono to become his running mate. The pair also received the support of the Crescent Star Party (PBB), the Indonesian Justice and Unity Party (PKPI), and Reform Star Party (PBR).

On 5 July 2004 the presidential election was held. Yudhoyono and Kalla won the popular vote with 33% of the votes but 50% of votes is required for election as president and vice president so a run-off was required. Yudhoyono and Megawati proceeded to the second election round held later in the year.

In the second ground Yudhoyono faced a considerable challenge from Megawati who formed a national coalition consisting of her own Indonesian Democratic Party-Struggle (PDI-P) along with Golkar, the United Development Party, the Prosperous Peace Party (PDS), and the Indonesian National Party (PNI). Whilst Yudhoyono consolidated political support from other parties, Kalla turned to Golkar for support. Led by Fahmi Idris and ignoring the party line, pro-Kalla elements in Golkar declared their support for Kalla and Yudhoyono. On 20 September 2004 Yudhoyono and Kalla won the run-off with 60.1% of the vote.

=== First vice-presidential term ===
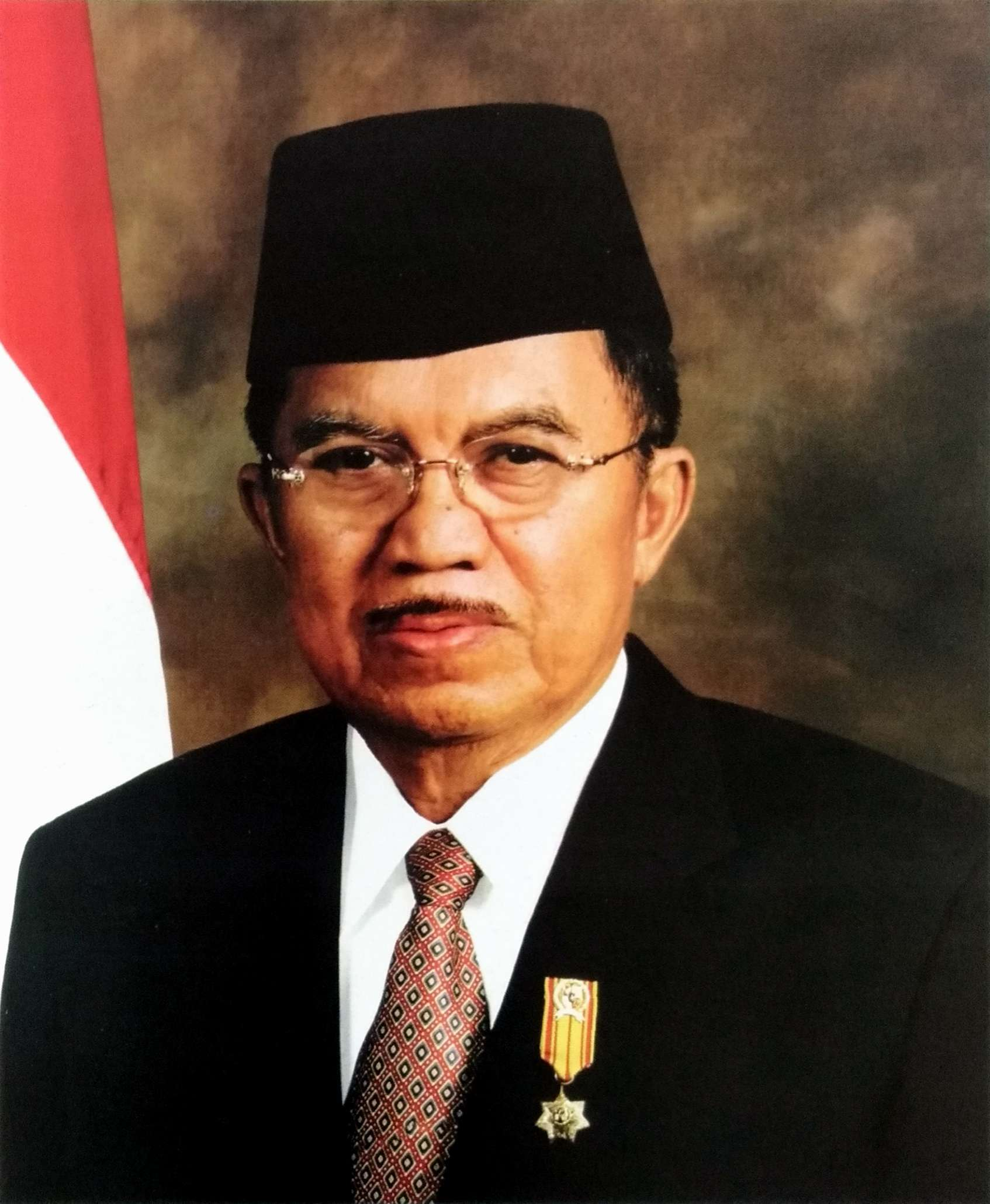
Official portrait, 2004

Although he had overwhelmingly won the presidency, Yudhoyono was still weak in the People's Representative Council (DPR). PD with all of its coalition partners were still too weak to contend with the legislative muscles of Golkar and PDI-P who now intended to play the role of opposition.

With a National Congress to be held in December 2004, Yudhoyono and Kalla had originally backed head of DPR Agung Laksono to become Golkar Chairman. When Agung was perceived to be too weak to run against Akbar, Yudhoyono and Kalla threw their weight behind Surya Paloh. Finally, when Paloh was also perceived to be too weak to run against Akbar, Yudhoyono gave the green light for Kalla to run for the Golkar Chairmanship. On 19 December 2004, Kalla was elected as the new Chairman of Golkar.

Kalla's victory posed a dilemma for Yudhoyono. Although it now enabled Yudhoyono to pass legislation, Kalla's new position meant that in one sense, he was now more powerful than Yudhoyono.

The first sign of rivalry came during the Indian Ocean tsunami when Kalla, apparently on his own initiative, assembled the ministers and signed a vice-presidential decree ordering work to begin on rehabilitating Aceh. The legality of the vice-presidential decree was questioned although Yudhoyono maintained that it was he who gave the orders for Kalla to proceed.

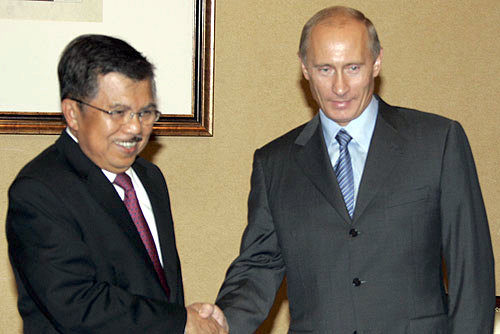
Jusuf Kalla with Russian President (then Prime Minister), Vladimir Putin

The second sign was in September 2005 when Yudhoyono went to New York to attend the annual United Nations Summit. Although Yudhoyono had left Kalla to take charge of proceedings at Jakarta, he seemed to be bent on maintaining a watch on matters at home. Yudhoyono would hold a video conference from New York to receive reports from ministers. Critics suggested that such conduct was an expression of distrust by Yudhoyono. The suggestion seemed to gain momentum when Kalla only showed up for one video conference and then spent the rest of the time taking care of Golkar matters.

Although things calmed down, especially with Golkar gaining another cabinet position in the reshuffle, the alleged rivalry surfaced again in October 2006 when Yudhoyono established the Presidential Work Unit for the Organization of Reform Program (UKP3R). Critics questioned whether the establishment of the unit was an attempt by Yudhoyono to exclude Kalla from the government. Yudhoyono was quick to clarify that in supervising UKP3R, he would be assisted by Kalla.

=== Potential presidential candidacy in 2014 ===
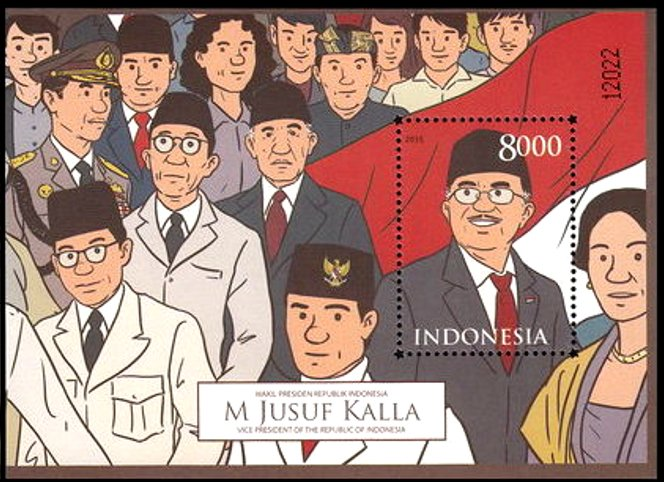
Jusuf Kalla was featured on a 2015 stamp in Indonesia.

Kalla has been often mentioned as a possible nominee of the Golkar Party in the 2014 presidential race. In 2009 Kalla ran in the Indonesian presidential election with former Armed Forces Chief of Staff Wiranto as his running mate, finishing third with 12.4% of the vote.

During a dedication ceremony of the Indonesian Red Cross headquarters in the Riau province on 3 February 2012 Kalla stated his willingness to run in the presidential election in 2014 should he receive sufficient public support. By May 2012 however, Kalla stated that he had no intention of running in the 2014 presidential election. Kalla said he had no hard feelings about party chairman Aburizal Bakrie's upcoming inauguration as presidential candidate for the Golkar Party and that he had no intention of competing with him despite surveys that showed that Kalla was likely to be more electable than Bakrie. During Golkar's National Leadership meeting in Bogor on 29 June 2012, Bakrie was officially declared the Golkar Party's 2014 presidential candidate.

Nevertheless, in the changeable political scene in Indonesia the situation can be expected to evolve in the preparations for the 2014 presidential election. In late 2012 Jusuf Kalla indicated that he would be prepared to move away from Golkar and join a ticket sponsored by the Indonesian Democratic Party of Struggle (PDI-P) with former president Megawati as candidate for president and him as the vice-presidential candidate. "If I am not representing Golkar Party, then I have no objection ... Everything is possible in politics," Kalla said.

=== Jokowi's running mate ===
Indonesian Democratic Party of Struggle (PDIP)'s presidential candidate Joko Widodo announced Jusuf Kalla as his vice-presidential running mate at Gedung Juang, Jakarta, on 19 May 2014.

=== Second vice-presidential term ===
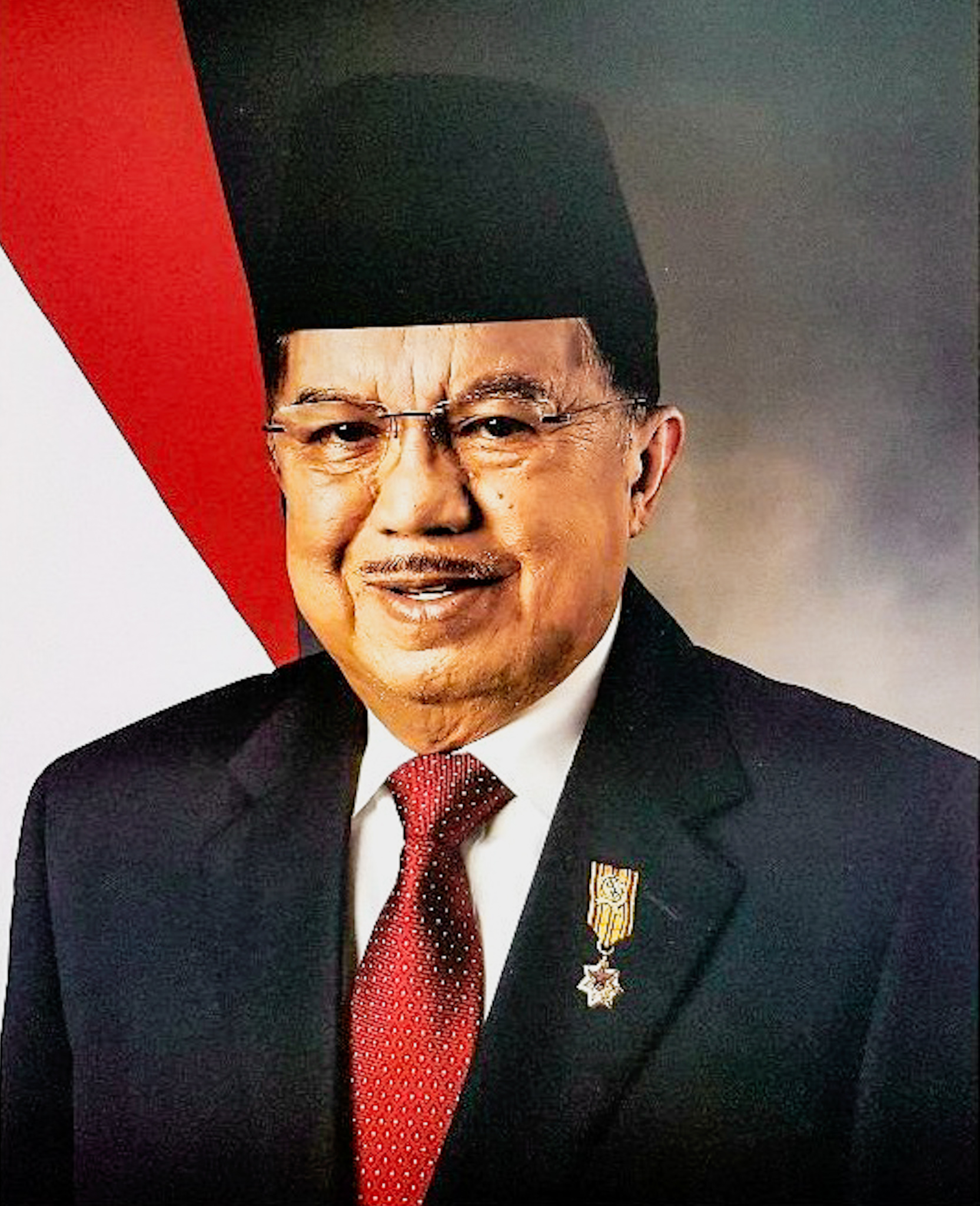
Official portrait, 2016

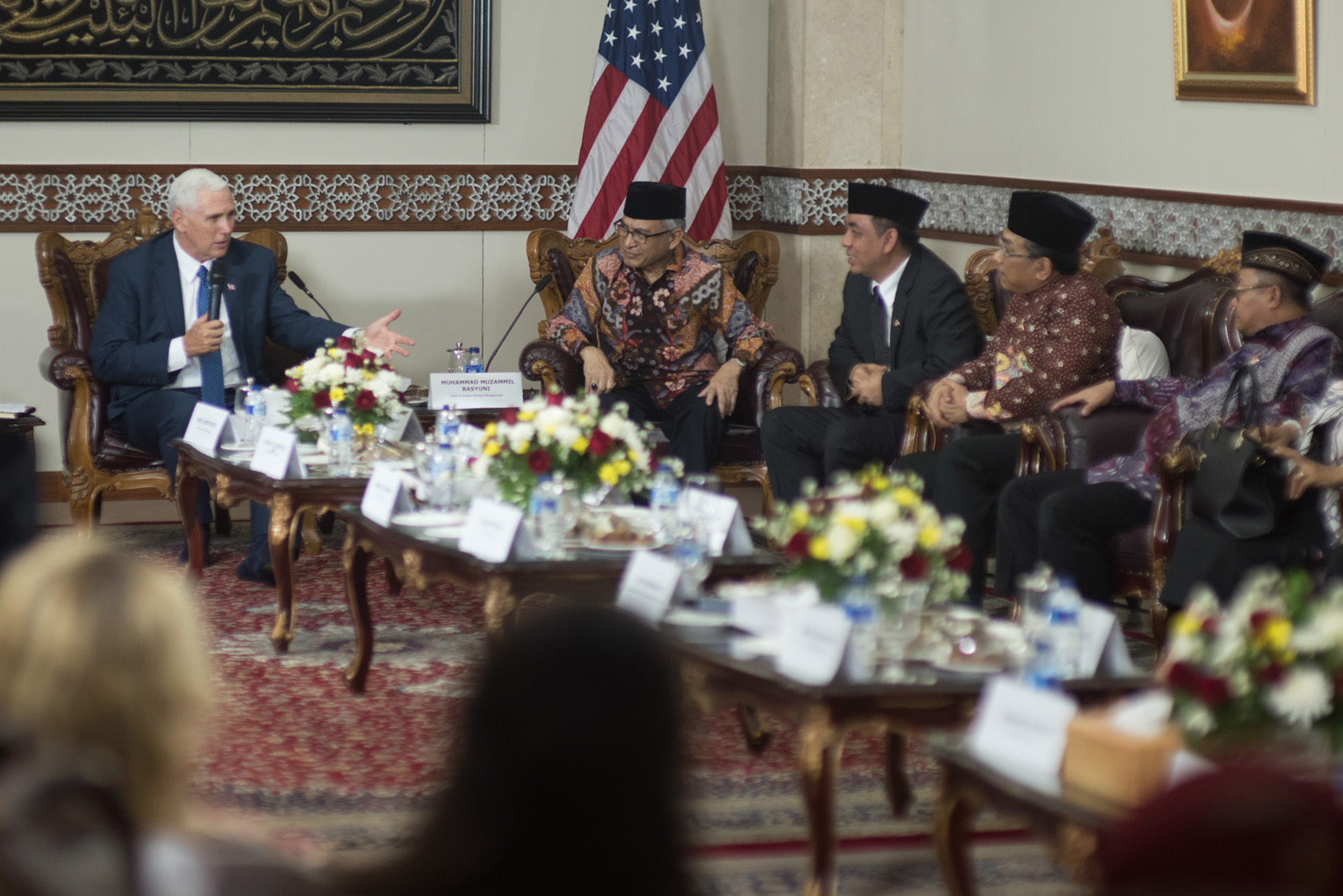
U.S. vice president Mike Pence meeting with Kalla and cabinet ministers, 20 April 2017

During his second term as vice president, Kalla criticized neighbor nations Malaysia and Singapore for airing their concerns about suffering from the repeated haze caused by Indonesian forest fires, stating in March 2015: "For 11 months, they enjoyed nice air from Indonesia and they never thanked us. They have suffered because of the haze for one month and they get upset." During the 2015 Southeast Asian haze crisis in September, Kalla restated a similar position, while further questioning "why should there be an apology" from Indonesia. It was also noted that Kalla had made similar comments between 2005 and 2007 during his first term in the vice presidency. In what was interpreted as a response to Kalla, the Singaporean Minister for Foreign Affairs, K. Shanmugam, while noting that "PSI levels in parts of Indonesia are at almost 2,000", expressed disappointment at "shocking statements made, at senior levels, from Indonesia ... without any regard for their people, or ours, and without any embarrassment, or sense of responsibility". With Indonesia's pollution index by the Indonesian Agency for Meteorology, Climatology and Geophysics declaring values over 350 to be "hazardous", it was reported on 22 September 2015 that the index in Palangkaraya in Central Kalimantan had hit 1,986. Later in September, Kalla insisted that Indonesia is "open", and requested that "Singapore, please come if you want to help. Don't just talk"; this was in spite of earlier rejections (in that month) by Indonesia of Singapore's offers of assistance. In November, Kalla said that the destruction of Indonesian forests was "not only our problem" as "foreign people" were also responsible. He scolded foreign companies, saying "You take [Indonesian products], and pay $5, and you bring it here, and sell for $100. Indonesian companies just get $5 ... you have to pay, if not we will cut down all the trees, and let the world feel the heat ... The world has to pay for all of this. Don't always accuse Indonesia." He also reiterated that since Singapore and Malaysia did not thank Indonesia for "fresh air from Sumatra, Kalimantan", then there was no need for Indonesia to apologize for haze from Indonesian forest fires.

In February 2016, Kalla told the United Nations Development Programme not to finance or carry out an LGBT (lesbian, gay, bisexual, and transgender) community program in Indonesia. Kalla previously stated opposition to LGBT campaigns in Indonesia, which he considered at that point as deviating from social values.

In April 2016, Kalla reportedly criticized how Singapore, "never wants to sign" an extradition agreement with Indonesia, despite Singapore supposedly being the "country where the largest number of" Indonesian fugitives had fled. The Singaporean Ministry of Foreign Affairs responded by pointing out that an Indonesia-Singapore extradition treaty cum defence cooperation pact had been signed in 2007, while Kalla was also vice president, but the treaty was still pending ratification by the Indonesian House of Representatives. The Indonesian House had rejected the dual agreement in 2013 as "not favourable to Indonesia", maintaining that "extradition and defence are two separate issues".

In December 2018, the issue of China's Xinjiang re-ducation camps and human rights abuses against the Uyghur Muslim minority was brought up in parliament. Kalla said: "we don't want to intervene in the domestic affairs of another country."

== Criticism ==
=== Racist statements ===
In June 2023, Kalla claimed that Chinese people control the Indonesian economy, given their involvement in business and trade, which was reported by newspapers and social media platforms in Indonesia and carried the potential to fuel racial tensions in Indonesia. Moreover, Kalla does not consider Chinese Indonesians to be Indonesians. Kalla's racist remarks have sparked a range of reactions. Apart from that, he said that Chinese Indonesians are reluctant to become civil servants because of low salaries, while in reality, the opportunities for Chinese have been long limited by the government itself, which is questioned by a journalist.

=== Blasphemy ===
In a public sermon held in Gadjah Mada University's mosque, Jusuf Kalla mentioned erroneously that Christians believed that killing or dying in a conflict will give them passage to Heaven. A police report on Jusuf Kalla for blasphemy was then lodged by Indonesian Christian Youth Movement (GAMKI), Indonesian Pastoral Association (API) and other Christian groups. Kalla's spokesperson Husain Abdullah criticize the Christian groups, telling them to understand the context of Kalla's sermon and claimed Kalla worked for peace during the Poso riots by straighten up the beliefs of both sides. The mosque's official channel reminded all who attended and watched the sermon to watch the entire video, not just from the clips circulated because video clips may often caused misunderstanding. Indonesian Ulama Council (MUI) also urged Christian groups to withdraw their police report for the sake of national unity and urged them to find out the facts behind the sermon. Kalla admitted that some Islamic groups wished to riot against the Christian groups because they felt offended by the accusations lodged to Kalla but urged them to calm down and not to make the situation worse, while pointing out that the Christian groups committed a sin far worse than murder.

== Personal life ==
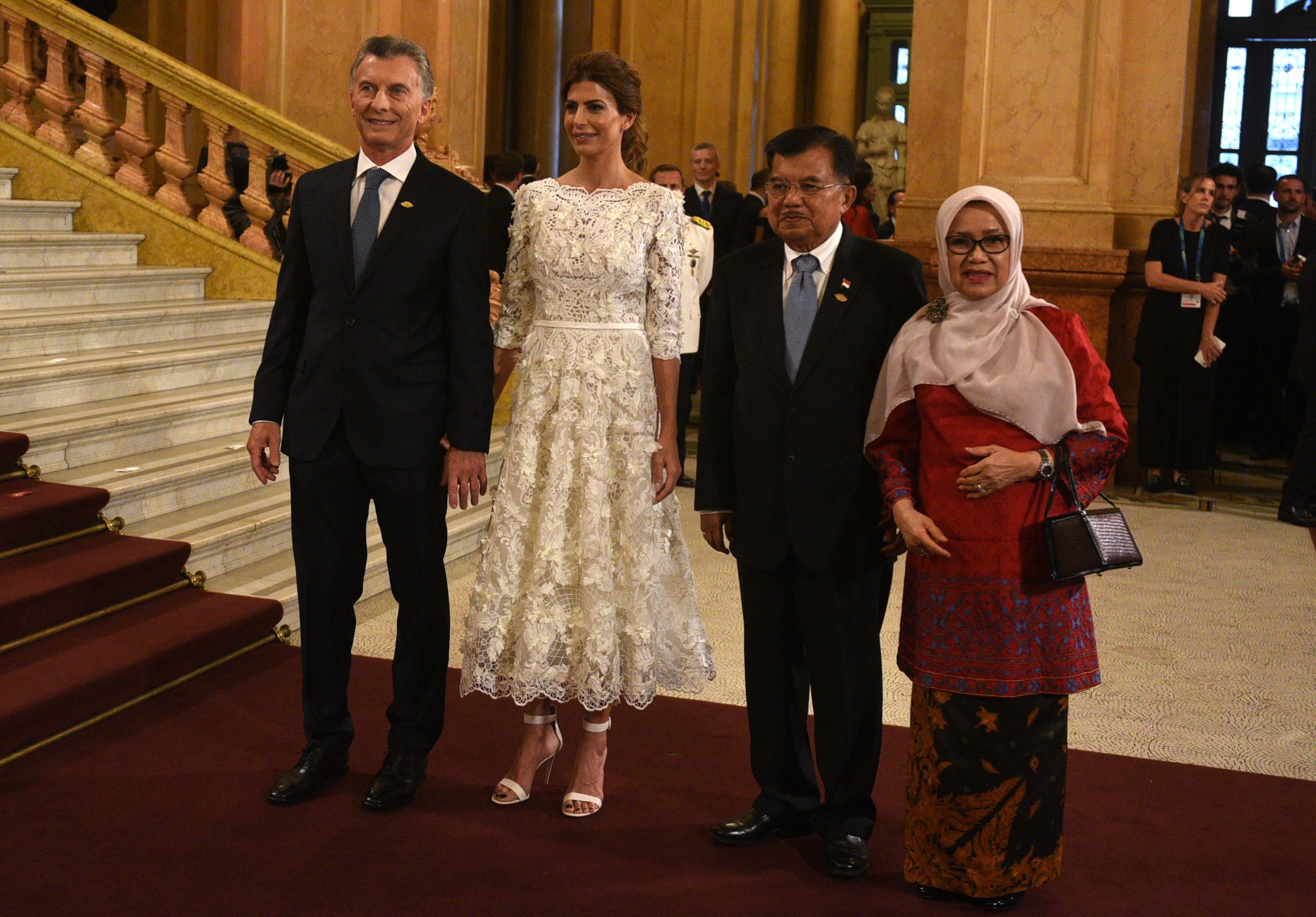
Argentine president Mauricio Macri and Kalla with their spouses at the 2018 G20 Buenos Aires summit

Kalla is married to Mufidah Miad Saad, with whom he has five children, Muchlisa, Muswira, Imelda, Solichin and Chaerani.

His career after the vice presidency has included many community activities. On 22 December 2009, he was elected as chairman of Indonesian Red Cross Society (Palang Merah Indonesia, PMI). Kalla said that under his leadership the PMI would build up stocks in the national blood bank to prepare for any increased demand for blood by hospital patients and victims of natural disasters.

He also holds an advance-class amateur radio license with call sign YC8HYK.

== Decorations ==
As the vice president of Indonesia, Kalla is automatically bestowed the highest class of six out of seven civilian Star Decorations (Indonesian: Tanda Kehormatan Bintang), namely:

=== National honours ===
- Star of the Republic of Indonesia, 2nd Class (Indonesian: Bintang Republik Indonesia Adipradana)
- Star of Mahaputera, 1st Class (Indonesian: Bintang Mahaputera Adipurna)
- Star of Merit, 1st Class (Indonesian: Bintang Jasa Utama)
- Star of Humanity (Indonesian: Bintang Kemanusiaan)
- Star of Democracy Upholder, 1st Class (Indonesian: Bintang Penegak Demokrasi Utama)
- Star of Culture Parama Dharma (Indonesian: Bintang Budaya Parama Dharma)
- Star of Bhayangkara, 1st Class (Indonesian: Bintang Bhayangkara Utama)

=== Foreign honours ===
- Japan
  - Grand Cordon of the Order of the Rising Sun

== See also ==
- List of vice presidents of Indonesia

Political offices
Preceded by Hamzah Haz	Vice President of Indonesia; 20 October 2004 – 20 October 2009	Succeeded by Boediono
Preceded by Boediono	Vice President of Indonesia; 20 October 2014 – 20 October 2019	Succeeded by Ma'ruf Amin
Party political offices
Preceded by Akbar Tandjung	Chairman of the Golkar Party; 2004–2009	Succeeded by Aburizal Bakrie
