= Vice President of Indonesia =

Second-highest constitutional office in Indonesia

Vice President of the Republic of Indonesia
- Wakil Presiden Republik Indonesia
- Vice-presidential seal
- Incumbent; Vacant since 12 November 2026
- Government of Indonesia
- Style: His Excellency
- Status: Deputy Head of state and Deputy Head of Government
- Residence: Vice Presidential Palace
- Seat: Jakarta
- Appointer: Direct popular election
- Term length: Five years, renewable once
- Constituting instrument: Constitution of Indonesia
- Inaugural holder: Mohammad Hatta
- Formation: 18 August 1945 (81 years ago)
- Salary: Rp 42,160,000 per month
- Website: Official website

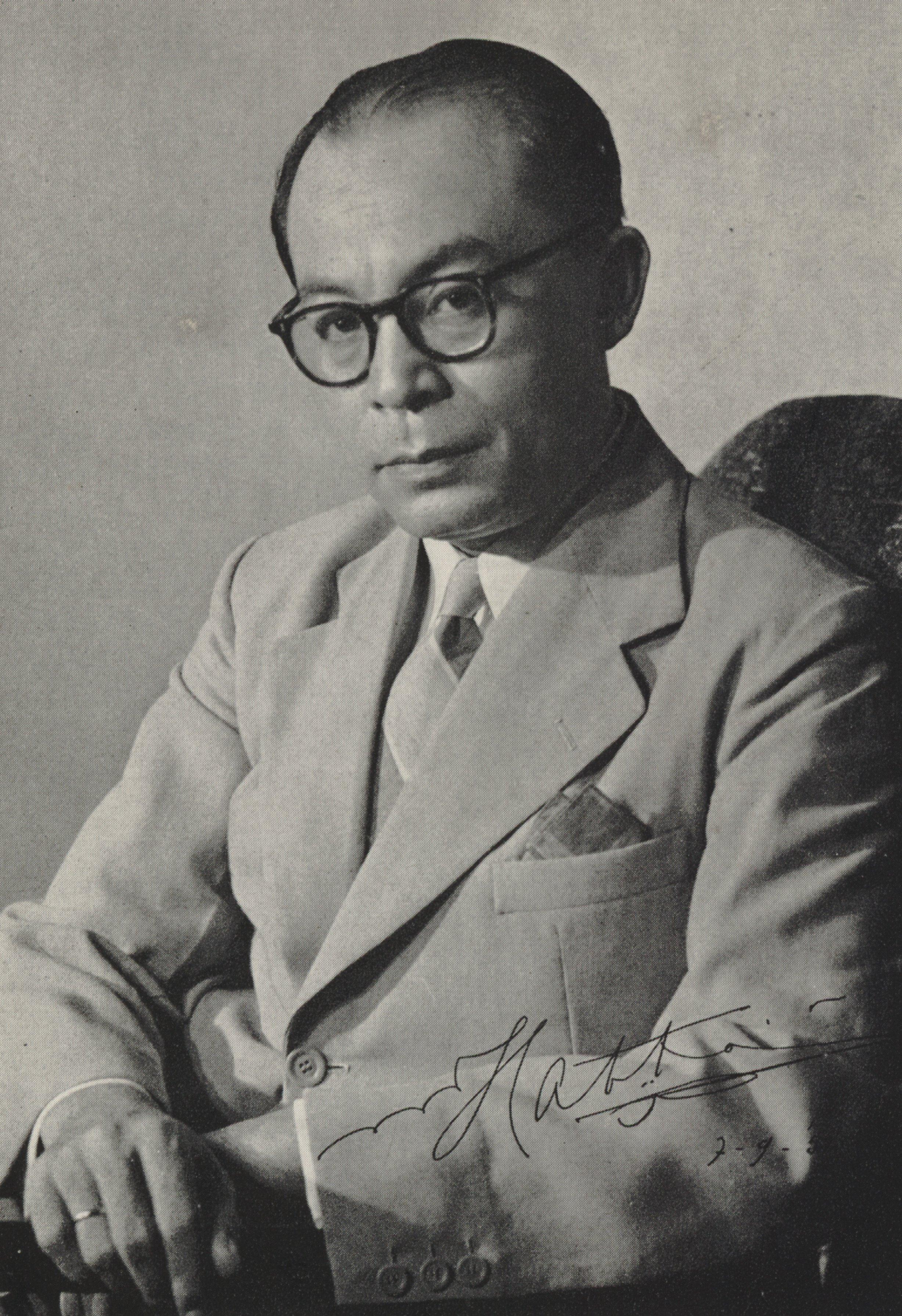
Mohammad Hatta, the first vice president of Indonesia

The vice president of the Republic of Indonesia (Indonesian: Wakil Presiden Republik Indonesia) is second-highest officer in the executive branch of the Indonesian government, after the president, and ranks first in the presidential line of succession. Since 2004, the president and vice president are directly elected to a five-year term.

Gibran Rakabuming Raka is the 14th and most recent vice president of Indonesia. The youngest ever vice president of Indonesia, he assumed office on 20 October 2024. He resigned on 12 November 2026.

== History of the office ==
=== Sukarno era ===
The Indonesian vice presidency was established during the formulation of the 1945 Constitution by the Investigating Committee for Preparatory Work for Independence (BPUPK). The office was first filled on 18 August 1945 when Mohammad Hatta was elected by acclamation. The election was conducted by the Preparatory Committee for Indonesian Independence (PPKI) because the body responsible for the vice presidential elections, the People's Consultative Assembly (MPR), had not been formed yet. On 16 October 1945, Hatta announced a vice presidential decree which gave the Central Indonesian National Committee (KNIP) equal status with that of the president. As a result of this decree, the KNIP was able to separate the role of head of state and head of government on 11 November 1945. Although a new constitution had not been set up yet, Indonesia was now a de facto parliamentary democracy.

During the Indonesian National Revolution, both Hatta and Sukarno were captured by the Dutch in Yogyakarta on 18 December 1948. Together with Sukarno, Hatta gave Syafruddin Prawiranegara a mandate to form an emergency government. This was done and the Emergency Government of the Republic of Indonesia (PDRI) was formed in Sumatra with Prawiranegara as chairman. Prawiranegara handed back his mandate to Sukarno and consequently, to Hatta on 13 July 1949.

Now officially an independent nation, Indonesia adopted the Provisional Constitution, a document which defined the president's role as a ceremonial head of state whose role was to appoint a prime minister on the advice of formateurs. Although the vice presidency continued to exist, the form of government was now officially a parliamentary democracy and there was not a significant role for the vice president to play. On 1 December 1956, partly because of his differences with Sukarno, Hatta resigned from the vice presidency.

For the next 17 years, the vice presidency remained vacant. In December 1965, there were calls for a vice president to be named to assist President Sukarno during the times of uncertainty. The idea did not gain momentum, and the vice presidency continued to remain vacant as the presidency passed over from Sukarno to General Suharto.

=== Suharto era ===
In March 1973, the vice president vacancy was filled by Hamengkubuwono IX when he was elected by the MPR. After Hamengkubuwono IX and throughout the New Order, the vice presidency was successively held by Adam Malik, Umar Wirahadikusumah, Sudharmono, Try Sutrisno, and BJ Habibie. During his time as president, Suharto would reduce the vice presidency to a sinecure. A vice president was reduced to making sure that government policy was being implemented and attending ceremonies. The vice president did not even take on presidential duties when Suharto was either out of the country or ill. The office would derogatorily be known as ban serep (spare tire). Despite being a largely figurehead role, the vice presidency twice became a source of controversy with Sudharmono having to face various obstacles en route to being vice president in 1988 and (then a fresh honorably discharged General) Try being preemptively nominated in 1993.

=== Reform era ===
With Suharto's fall in May 1998 and Habibie's accession to the presidency, the vice presidency once again became vacant. In October 1999, Megawati Sukarnoputri was elected as vice president and the office began to gain significance. Megawati was delegated genuine tasks to do and in 2000, she even became responsible for the day-to-day running of the government.

During the 2001 MPR Annual Session, it was finally decided that from 2004 onwards, the vice president, together with the president, would directly be elected by the people. The substantial role that the vice presidency was to have was evident in the way in which the 2004 presidential candidates chose their running mates. Jusuf Kalla subsequently became Indonesia's first directly elected vice president.

== The vice presidency ==
=== Requirements to run for office ===
The Amended 1945 Constitution: The vice presidential candidate has to be an Indonesian citizen since birth, not willingly become a citizen of another nation, not betrayed the nation, and is physically and mentally capable of performing the duties. The amended Constitution also states that further criteria will be determined by law. The vice president is also required to be nominated by a political party or a coalition of political parties.

Law No. 7 of 2017 and Constitutional Court Ruling No. 90/PUU-XXI/2023 on the Presidential and Vice Presidential Elections: The vice presidential candidate must:

- believe in the one and only God;
- be an Indonesian citizen since birth, who has not willingly become a citizen in another nation;
- have not betrayed the nation, and has not been involved in any corruption or other crime;
- be physically and mentally capable of performing the duties;
- be a permanent resident in the territory of the Republic of Indonesia;
- have reported personal wealth to the Corruption Eradication Commission;
- have no individually or collectively debts that could result in a loss to the state;
- have not been declared bankrupt by a court decision;
- have never been involved in any despicable act;
- be registered as a voter;
- be registered as a tax payer and paid taxes for at least the last five years;
- have not been vice president for two terms previously;
- be faithful to the Pancasila, the 1945 Constitution, and the vision of the Indonesian Declaration of Independence;
- have not been sentenced to jail for more than five years;
- not be less than 40 years of age, or had been elected into office;
- have attended school at least to the Senior High School or others with the same level;
- have never been a member of the Communist Party of Indonesia or the mass organisation of that party;
- have a vision, mission, and programs to executing the office of vice president.

The Original 1945 Constitution: The vice presidential candidate has to be of Indonesian origin.

2nd Resolution of 1973 MPR: The vice presidential candidate has to make a statement in writing which declares that he or she is able to work together with the president.

The 1950 Provisional Constitution: The vice presidential candidate has to be an Indonesian citizen aged at least 40 years old, cannot be someone who is deemed to be undesirable, or had right to take part in elections revoked. The candidate is also required to not be involved with any private corporations.

=== Election, term of office, constitutional requirement ===
The Amended 1945 Constitution: Together with the president, the vice president is elected directly by the people on a ticket. Further election rules are determined by laws passed by the DPR. The vice president-elect is required to read either an oath or a promise of office before officially becoming vice president. The term of office is five years and after that the vice president can be re-elected for only one more term.

The Original 1945 Constitution: Together with the president, the vice president is elected by the MPR with the largest number of votes. The vice president-elect is also required to read either an oath or a promise of office before officially becoming vice president. The term of office is five years and after that the vice president can be re-elected.

The 1950 Provisional Constitution: Together with the president, the vice president is elected according to rules specified by law. The vice president-elect is required to read either an oath or a promise or a statement of office before officially becoming vice president. The vice president is constitutionally required to live where the seat of government is.

=== Oath or affirmation of office ===
Oath of Office of the Vice President of the Republic of Indonesia: "I swear by Allah to fulfill the duties of president (vice president) of the Republic of Indonesia to the best of my capabilities and in the fairest way possible, to uphold the Constitution by all means and to execute all laws and regulations as straightforwardly as possible as well as to dedicate myself to the service of the nation and the people."

Pledge of Office of the Vice President of the Republic of Indonesia: "I solemnly pledge to fulfill the duties of president (vice president) of the Republic of Indonesia to the best of my capabilities and in the fairest way possible, to uphold the Constitution by all means and to execute all laws and regulations as straightforwardly as possible as well as to dedicate myself to the service of the nation and the people."

=== Powers ===
None specified by all constitutions. The convention has been for the president to delegate a task for the vice president to do.

=== Line of succession and impeachment ===
The Amended 1945 Constitution: The vice president replaces the president if the president dies, resigns, or is unable to perform his or her duties for any reason. If the president and the vice president die, resign, or are unable to perform their duties for any reason, the government will be taken over together by minister of foreign affairs, minister of internal affairs and minister of defence. Then the MPR will elect a new president from the two candidates nominated by the political parties whose candidates are the winner and the runner-up in the past presidential election. If the vice presidency becomes vacant with the president still holding office, the president nominates two candidates and the MPR has to elect a new vice president out of the candidates within 60 days. Under the amended constitution, the vice president can now be impeached and removed from office. If the vice president is viewed to be unfit to perform his duties and has committed crimes such as corruption and betraying the Nation, the DPR can appeal to the Supreme Court to try the vice president. Furthermore, the DPR can ask the Constitutional Court to look into the matter, during which it has 90 days to make a decision. With the decision made, the DPR can motion for the MPR to convene. The vice president would then be given one last chance to defend himself or herself before the MPR makes the decision whether or not the vice president should be impeached.

The Original 1945 Constitution: The vice president replaces the president if the president dies, resigns, or is unable to perform his or her duties for any reason.

The 1950 Provisional Constitution: The vice president replaces the president if the president dies, resigns, or is unable to perform his or her duties for any reason.

=== Post-vice presidency ===
Law No. 7 of 1978 stipulates that former vice presidents are entitled to a pension. Former vice presidents are also entitled to a house with electricity, water, and telephone bills covered by the government. In addition, former vice presidents will have free healthcare for their families and a car with chauffeur.

=== Decorations ===
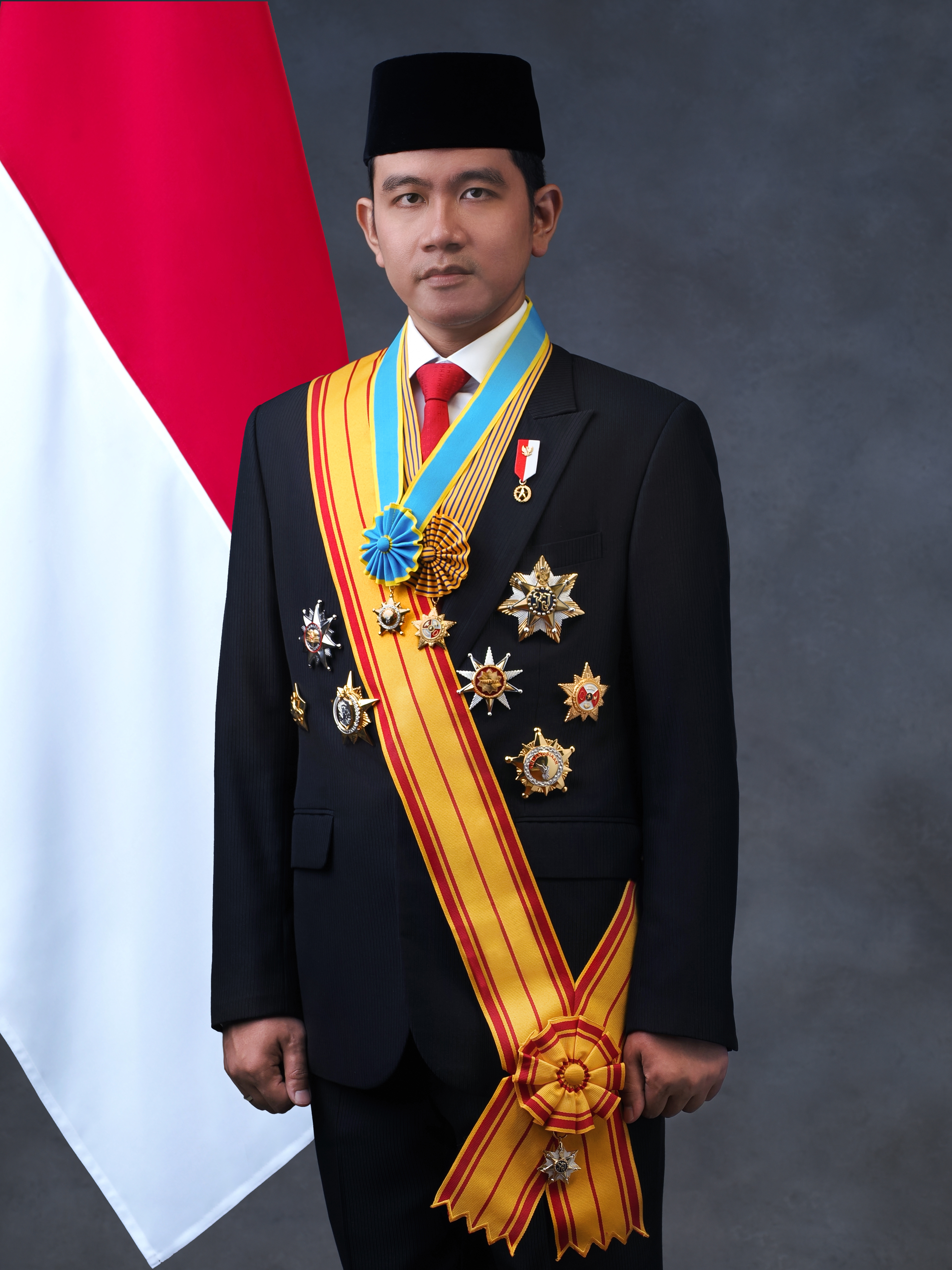
Gibran Rakabuming with vice-presidential decorations (2024)

A vice president of Indonesia is automatically bestowed the highest class of six out of seven civilian Star Decorations (Tanda Kehormatan Bintang), namely:

- Star of the Republic of Indonesia, 2nd Class (Bintang Republik Indonesia Adipradana)
- Star of Mahaputera, 1st Class (Bintang Mahaputera Adipurna)
- Star of Service, 1st Class (Bintang Jasa Utama)
- Star of Humanity (Bintang Kemanusiaan)
- Star of Democracy Upholder, 1st Class (Bintang Penegak Demokrasi Utama)
- Star of Meritorious Service for Culture (Bintang Budaya Parama Dharma)
- Police Star of Merit (Bintang Bhayangkara)

== See also ==
- Presidential state car
- Indonesian Air Force 01
- List of vice presidents of Indonesia
