= Lapindo Brantas =

Indonesian oil and gas company

PT Lapindo Brantas
- Industry: Oil and gas
- Headquarters: Sidoarjo, Indonesia
- Key people: Rinov Putra Laksono
- Products: Petroleum; Natural gas

PT Lapindo Brantas is an Indonesian oil and gas exploration company. It was established as a joint venture between PT. Energi Mega Persada Tbk. (50%), PT. Medco Energi Tbk. (32%) and Santos Australia (18%). The Bakrie family, through its investments, held a controlling stake in PT. Energi Mega Persada Tbk. Lapindo Brantas currently employs a staff of 77 permanent and contract employees and 142 personnel working for the company through a third party contract.

== Operations ==
=== Exploration and production ===
Lapindo Brantas operates in the Brantas Block in East Java, Indonesia. The working area covers 3,042 square kilometres (1,175 sq mi) encompassing two onshore and three offshore sites:

- Area-1: Kediri Regency, Nganjuk Regency and Jombang Regency (onshore);
- Area-2: Sidoarjo Regency, Pasuruan Regency and Mojokerto Regency (onshore);
- Area-3: Probolinggo Regency and Situbondo Regency (offshore);
- Area-4: Probolinggo Regency and Situbondo Regency (offshore);
- Area-5: Probolinggo Regency and Situbondo Regency (offshore).

=== Gas distribution ===
In 2009, Lapindo Brantas started to supply households in East Java with natural gas. The project involves supplying 8 million cubic feet per day (230×10^{3} m^{3}/d) of gas to households in surrounding villages of Surabaya.

== Sidoarjo mud flow ==
The Sidoarjo mud flow is the result of an erupting mud volcano in the subdistrict of Porong, Sidoarjo in East Java, Indonesia that has been in eruption since May 2006. It is the biggest mud volcano in the world; responsibility for it was credited to the blowout of a natural gas well drilled by Lapindo Brantas, although some scientists and company officials contend it was caused by a distant earthquake.

Lapindo Brantas took responsibility in covering the cost of emergency response and victim resettlement, paying more than Rp.5 trillion (approx. US$550 million) despite its acquittal as the cause of the mudflow in 2009 by Indonesia's Supreme Court.
