= List of vice presidents of Indonesia =

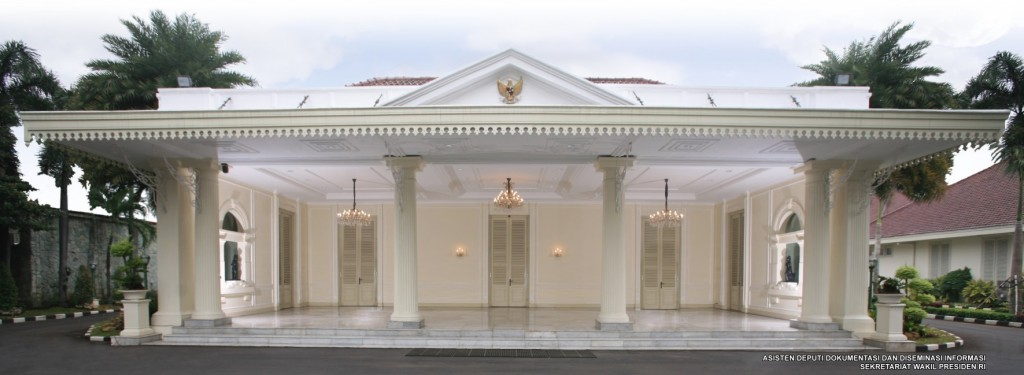
Vice Presidential Palace, the official residence of the vice president of Indonesia

The vice president of the Republic of Indonesia (Indonesian: Wakil Presiden Republik Indonesia) is the second-highest officer in the executive branch of the Indonesian government, after the president, and ranks first in the presidential line of succession. Since 2004, the president and vice president are directly elected to a five-year term as a single ticket.

The vice presidency was established during the formulation of the 1945 Constitution by the Investigating Committee for Preparatory Work for Independence (BPUPK), a research body for the preparation of Indonesian independence. On 18 August 1945, the Preparatory Committee for Indonesian Independence (PPKI), which was created on 7 August to replace the BPUPK, selected Sukarno as the country's first president and Mohammad Hatta as vice president.

== Vice presidents ==
Independent
Golkar
National Awakening Party (PKB)
Indonesian Democratic Party of Struggle (PDI-P)
United Development Party (PPP)

No.	Portrait	Name (Lifespan)	Term of office			Election	Party	President
No.	Portrait	Name (Lifespan)	Took office	Left office	Time in office	Election	Party	President
1		Mohammad Hatta (1902–1980)	18 August 1945	1 December 1956 (Note: Hatta announced his resignation from office on 26 July 1956, effective on 1 December 1956 and legitimized retroactively on 5 February 1957.)	11 years, 105 days	1945	Independent	Sukarno
1		Mohammad Hatta (1902–1980)	The longest-serving vice president.					Sukarno
Vacant (1 December 1956 – 12 March 1967) (Note: President Sukarno did not name Hatta's successor as vice president. In December 1965, there were calls for a vice president to be named to assist Sukarno with the fallout of the 30 September Movement and General Suharto's attempts to take over the government. It was not until the New Order regime of President Suharto that the office became filled again.)								Sukarno
Vacant (12 March 1967 – 23 March 1973)								Suharto
2		Hamengkubuwono IX (1912–1988)	23 March 1973	23 March 1978 (Note: Vice President Hamengkubuwono IX rejected his nomination for second period of vice president by the People's Consultative Assembly (MPR) in March 1978 due to poor health.)	5 years	1973	Independent	Suharto
2		Hamengkubuwono IX (1912–1988)	The first and only vice president who was a sultan and concurrently served as governor.					Suharto
3		Adam Malik (1917–1984)	23 March 1978	11 March 1983	4 years, 353 days	1978	Golkar	Suharto
3		Adam Malik (1917–1984)	The first and only vice president who was a speaker of the House of Representatives, the first and only vice president who was a Batak.					Suharto
4		Umar Wirahadikusumah (1924–2003)	11 March 1983	11 March 1988	5 years	1983	Golkar	Suharto
4		Umar Wirahadikusumah (1924–2003)	The first vice president who was a Sundanese, the first vice president from the military.					Suharto
5		Sudharmono (1927–2006)	11 March 1988	11 March 1993	5 years	1988	Golkar	Suharto
5		Sudharmono (1927–2006)	The first vice president born in East Java.					Suharto
6		Try Sutrisno (1935–2026)	11 March 1993	11 March 1998	5 years	1993	Golkar	Suharto
6		Try Sutrisno (1935–2026)	The first and only vice president who served as the commander of the military, the longest lived president or vice president (died aged 90 years, 107 days), the longest post-vice presidency timespan (27 years, 356 days).					Suharto
7		B. J. Habibie (1936–2019)	11 March 1998	21 May 1998 (Note: Following the 1997 Asian financial crisis, there were calls for Suharto's resignation as president. On 21 May 1998, Suharto resigned from office. Habibie became his successor as president of Indonesia.)	71 days	1998	Golkar	Suharto
7		B. J. Habibie (1936–2019)	The first vice president born in Eastern Indonesia, the shortest-serving vice president, the first to succeed to the presidency.					Suharto
Vacant (21 May 1998 – 20 October 1999)								B. J. Habibie
8		Megawati Sukarnoputri (born 1947)	21 October 1999	23 July 2001 (Note: After Abdurrahman Wahid was impeached by the MPR, Vice President Megawati replaced him as president of Indonesia.)	1 year, 275 days	1999	PDI-P	Abdurrahman Wahid
8		Megawati Sukarnoputri (born 1947)	The first female vice president, the first to be born after Proclamation of Independence, the most recent to succeed to the presidency.					Abdurrahman Wahid
Vacant (23–26 July 2001)								Megawati Sukarnoputri
9		Hamzah Haz (1940–2024)	26 July 2001	20 October 2004	3 years, 86 days	2001	PPP	Megawati Sukarnoputri
9		Hamzah Haz (1940–2024)	The first vice president born in Kalimantan, the first and only to be elected intra-term.					Megawati Sukarnoputri
10		Jusuf Kalla (born 1942)	20 October 2004	20 October 2009	5 years	2004	Golkar	Susilo Bambang Yudhoyono
10		Jusuf Kalla (born 1942)	The first vice president to be elected through direct election, and later the first one to be reelected.					Susilo Bambang Yudhoyono
11		Boediono (born 1943)	20 October 2009	20 October 2014	5 years	2009	Independent	Susilo Bambang Yudhoyono
11		Boediono (born 1943)	The first and only vice president to have previously served as minister of finance or the governor of the central bank.					Susilo Bambang Yudhoyono
12		Jusuf Kalla (born 1942)	20 October 2014	20 October 2019	5 years	2014	Golkar	Joko Widodo
12		Jusuf Kalla (born 1942)	The first and only vice president to be reelected and serve under two different presidents.					Joko Widodo
13		Ma'ruf Amin (born 1943)	20 October 2019	20 October 2024	5 years	2019	Independent (2019–2024)	Joko Widodo
13		Ma'ruf Amin (born 1943)	20 October 2019	20 October 2024	5 years	2019	PKB (since 2024)	Joko Widodo
13		Ma'ruf Amin (born 1943)	The oldest to assume the vice presidency, the first ulama to become vice president.					Joko Widodo
14		Gibran Rakabuming Raka (born 1987)	20 October 2024	12 November 2026 (Note: Gibran announced his resignation from office on 11 November 2026, effective on 12 November 2026.)	2 years, 23 days	2024	Independent	Prabowo Subianto
14		Gibran Rakabuming Raka (born 1987)	The youngest vice president, the first to have been a regional politician (mayor for three years). He was the first vice president who resigned from office since 1956 and the first to resign after Reformation.					Prabowo Subianto
Vacant (12 November 2026–present)								Prabowo Subianto

== By age ==
#	Vice president	Born	Age at start of vice presidency	Age at end of vice presidency	Post-VP timespan	Lifespan	
#	Vice president	Born	Age at start of vice presidency	Age at end of vice presidency	Post-VP timespan	Died	Age
1	Mohammad Hatta	12 August 1902	43 years, 6 days 18 August 1945	54 years, 111 days 1 December 1956 (Note: Resigned from office.)	23 years, 165 days	14 May 1980	77 years, 276 days
2	Hamengkubuwono IX	12 April 1912	60 years, 345 days 23 March 1973	65 years, 345 days 23 March 1978	10 years, 193 days	2 October 1988	76 years, 173 days
3	Adam Malik	22 July 1917	60 years, 244 days 23 March 1978	65 years, 232 days 11 March 1983	1 year, 178 days	5 September 1984	67 years, 45 days
4	Umar Wirahadikusumah	10 October 1924	58 years, 152 days 11 March 1983	63 years, 153 days 11 March 1988	15 years, 10 days	21 March 2003	78 years, 162 days
5	Sudharmono	12 March 1927	60 years, 365 days 11 March 1988	65 years, 364 days 11 March 1993	12 years, 320 days	25 January 2006	78 years, 319 days
6	Try Sutrisno	15 November 1935	57 years, 116 days 11 March 1993	62 years, 116 days 11 March 1998	27 years, 356 days	2 March 2026	90 years, 107 days
7	B. J. Habibie	25 June 1936	61 years, 259 days 11 March 1998	61 years, 330 days 21 May 1998 (Note: Succeeded to the presidency.)	21 years, 113 days	11 September 2019	83 years, 78 days
8	Megawati Sukarnoputri	23 January 1947	52 years, 271 days 21 October 1999	54 years, 181 days 23 July 2001	25 years, 114 days	(living)	79 years, 295 days
9	Hamzah Haz	15 February 1940	61 years, 161 days 26 July 2001 (Note: Elected by the MPR to fill an intra-term vacancy in the vice presidency.)	64 years, 248 days 20 October 2004	19 years, 278 days	24 July 2024	84 years, 160 days
10	Jusuf Kalla	15 May 1942	62 years, 158 days 20 October 2004	67 years, 158 days 20 October 2009	5 years, 0 days (Note: Kalla was vice president for two non-consecutive terms; this was his first post vice-presidential retirement between his terms (2009–2014).)	(living)	84 years, 183 days
11	Boediono	25 February 1943	66 years, 237 days 20 October 2009	71 years, 237 days 20 October 2014	12 years, 25 days	(living)	83 years, 262 days
12	Jusuf Kalla	15 May 1942	72 years, 158 days 20 October 2014	77 years, 158 days 20 October 2019	7 years, 25 days (Note: Kalla was vice president for two non-consecutive terms; this was his post vice-presidency retirement counting only from after his second term (from 20 October 2019).)	(living)	84 years, 183 days
13	Ma'ruf Amin	11 March 1943	76 years, 223 days 20 October 2019	81 years, 223 days 20 October 2024	2 years, 25 days	(living)	83 years, 248 days
14	Gibran Rakabuming Raka	1 October 1987	37 years, 19 days 20 October 2024	39 years, 42 days 12 November 2026	2 days	(living)	39 years, 44 days
#	Vice president	Born	Age at start of vice presidency	Age at end of vice presidency	Post-VP timespan	Lifespan	
#	Vice president	Born	Age at start of vice presidency	Age at end of vice presidency	Post-VP timespan	Died	Age

== By time in office ==
Rank	Vice president	Length in days	Order of vice presidency	Number of terms
1	Mohammad Hatta	4,123 (Note: Hatta was detained by Dutch troops on 19 December 1948 during Operation Kraai. During this time, the Emergency Government of the Republic of Indonesia, led by Sjafruddin Prawiranegara, acted as the country's government-in-exile until 13 July 1949 (206 days). Hatta became Prime Minister of the United States of Indonesia instead of the Vice President between 27 December 1949 and 15 August 1950 (231 days).)	1st • 18 August 1945 – 1 December 1956 (Note: Resigned from office)	N/A: Appointed by the Preparatory Committee for Indonesian Independence, never faced reelection.
2	Jusuf Kalla	3,652 (Note: Each of Kalla's two non-consecutive terms in office was 1,826 days long.)	10th • 20 October 2004 – 20 October 2009	Two full terms (non-consecutive)
2	Jusuf Kalla	3,652	12th • 20 October 2014 – 20 October 2019	Two full terms (non-consecutive)
3 tie	Umar Wirahadikusumah	1,827 (Note: His term had two leap days instead of one.)	4th • 11 March 1983 – 11 March 1988	One full term
3 tie	Ma'ruf Amin	1,827	13th • 20 October 2019 – 20 October 2024	One full term
5 tie	Hamengkubuwono IX	1,826	2nd • 23 March 1973 – 23 March 1978	One full term
5 tie	Sudharmono	1,826	5th • 11 March 1988 – 11 March 1993	One full term
5 tie	Try Sutrisno	1,826	6th • 11 March 1993 – 11 March 1998	One full term
5 tie	Boediono	1,826	11th • 20 October 2009 – 20 October 2014	One full term
9	Adam Malik	1,814 (Note: The 1983 inauguration day was moved from 23 March to 11 March, 12 days shorter than a normal term.)	3rd • 23 March 1978 – 11 March 1983	One full term
10	Hamzah Haz	1,182 (Note: Elected by the MPR to fill an intra-term vacancy in the vice presidency.)	9th • 26 July 2001 – 20 October 2004	One partial term (3 years, 2 months, and 24 days)
11	Gibran Rakabuming Raka	753	14th • 20 October 2024 – 12 November 2026	One partial term (2 years and 22 days)
12	Megawati Sukarnoputri	641	8th • 21 October 1999 – 23 July 2001 (Note: Succeeded to presidency.)	One partial term (1 year, 9 months, and 2 days)
13	B. J. Habibie	71	7th • 11 March 1998 – 21 May 1998	One partial term (2 months and 10 days)

== See also ==
- President of Indonesia
  - List of presidents of Indonesia
- Vice President of Indonesia
- Prime Minister of Indonesia
