= Inauguration of Joko Widodo =

Inauguration of Joko Widodo may refer to:

- First inauguration of Joko Widodo, 2014
- Second inauguration of Joko Widodo, 2019
