= 2014 Indonesian presidential election =

- 9 July 2014
- Registered: 193,944,150 (▲9.97%)
- Turnout: 69.58% (▼2.99pp)
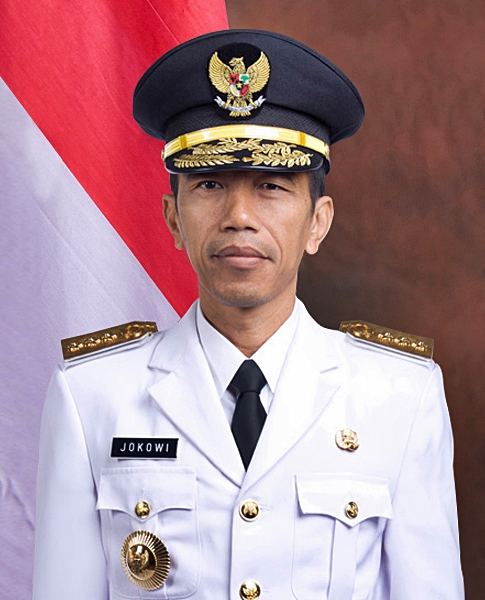

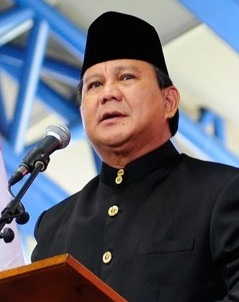
Candidate	Joko Widodo	Prabowo Subianto
Party	PDI-P	Gerindra
Alliance	Great Indonesia (Note: Including the PDI-P, the National Awakening Party, the NasDem Party, the People's Conscience Party and the Indonesian Justice and Unity Party.)	Red-White (Note: Including Gerindra, Golkar, the National Mandate Party, the Prosperous Justice Party, the United Development Party and the Crescent Star Party.)
Running mate	Jusuf Kalla	Hatta Rajasa
Popular vote	70,997,833	62,576,444
Percentage	53.15%	46.85%
President before election
Susilo Bambang Yudhoyono
Demokrat
Elected President
Joko Widodo
PDI-P

Presidential elections were held in Indonesia on 9 July 2014, with former general Prabowo Subianto contesting the elections against the governor of Jakarta, Joko Widodo; incumbent president Susilo Bambang Yudhoyono was constitutionally barred from seeking a third term in office. On 22 July the General Elections Commission (KPU) announced Joko Widodo's victory. He and his vice president, Jusuf Kalla, were sworn-in on 20 October 2014, for a five-year term.

According to the 2008 election law, only parties or coalitions controlling 20% of DPR seats or winning 25% of the popular votes in the 2014 parliamentary elections are eligible to nominate a candidate. This law was challenged in the Constitutional Court, but in late January 2014, the court ruled that the requirement would stand for this election. No party exceeded the threshold in the 2014 legislative elections; therefore, two coalitions were formed.

== Electoral system ==
Arrangements for the conduct of elections in Indonesia are carried out under the supervision of the KPU. The presidential elections in 2014 were carried out under the 2008 election law (Undang-undang, or UU) No. 42 on the election of a president and vice president.

Arrangements for nominations An important requirement, set out in Law No. 42 of 2008 (Clause 9), is that nominations of candidates for the presidential election may only be made by a party (or coalition of parties) which has at least 20% of the seats in the national parliament (the DPR, or the Dewan Perwakilan Rakyat) or which received 25% of national votes in the previous national legislative election for the DPR. In practice, these conditions set a rather high bar for nomination. The likelihood is that only candidates supported by one of the major parties, perhaps with some support from several of the minor parties, will be able to meet the conditions for nomination. Among other things, the effect of this requirement is likely to be a strict limit on the number of candidates who will be able to stand for the presidency.

Indonesia worked towards implementing e-voting the 2014 general elections using electronic identity cards (e-KTP), which had been tested in six districts/cities, namely Padang, West Sumatra; Denpasar, Bali; Jembrana, Bali; Yogyakarta, Java; Cilegon, West Java; and Makassar (South Sulawesi).

However, the system was not ready for the election. Therefore, voters still voted on paper by punching a hole in one of the two candidates' photograph, number, or name. The ballots were then collected and counted at the village level, then city/regency level, province level, and finally the national level.

== Political parties ==
Candidates for president are nominated as individuals (along with a vice-presidential running partner); however, support from the main political parties is likely to play a crucial role in influencing the result. Partly for this reason, the highly changeable map of political parties in Indonesia contributes to the uncertainty of political trends in the run-up to the presidential election. In recent years, the number of political parties contesting major elections (for both national and regional parliaments and the presidential elections) has varied considerably.

- In 2004, 24 parties contested the national elections and 16 secured enough seats to be represented in the national parliament.
- In 2009, 38 parties contested the national elections and nine secured enough seats to be represented in the national parliament.
- In 2014, 12 parties contested the national legislative elections on 9 April, and three more were authorised to run candidates in Aceh. (Brief details of the parties are listed at the relevant page on the website of the KPU.) It is expected that candidates for president who hope to mount an effective campaign will need to secure the support of at least one of the major parties as well as several other smaller parties. Details of the twelve main national parties who qualified to mount nationwide political campaigns are as follows:

=== Summary of registered parties support ===
No seats in parliament (did not pass the threshold in the 2014 legislative election)

Known as	Party	English name	Supporting	DPR seats	DPR seats %	Legislative votes %
Gerindra	Partai Gerakan Indonesia Raya	Gerindra Party	Nominee: Prabowo Subianto (Gerindra); Running mate: Hatta Rajasa (PAN)	Majority coalition: Gerindra/Golkar/PPP/PKS/PAN/Demokrat 353 / 560	63.04%	59.12%
Golkar	Partai Golongan Karya	Golkar	Nominee: Prabowo Subianto (Gerindra); Running mate: Hatta Rajasa (PAN)	Majority coalition: Gerindra/Golkar/PPP/PKS/PAN/Demokrat 353 / 560	63.04%	59.12%
PPP	Partai Persatuan Pembangunan	United Development Party	Nominee: Prabowo Subianto (Gerindra); Running mate: Hatta Rajasa (PAN)	Majority coalition: Gerindra/Golkar/PPP/PKS/PAN/Demokrat 353 / 560	63.04%	59.12%
PKS	Partai Keadilan Sejahtera	Prosperous Justice Party	Nominee: Prabowo Subianto (Gerindra); Running mate: Hatta Rajasa (PAN)	Majority coalition: Gerindra/Golkar/PPP/PKS/PAN/Demokrat 353 / 560	63.04%	59.12%
PAN	Partai Amanat Nasional	National Mandate Party	Nominee: Prabowo Subianto (Gerindra); Running mate: Hatta Rajasa (PAN)	Majority coalition: Gerindra/Golkar/PPP/PKS/PAN/Demokrat 353 / 560	63.04%	59.12%
PBB	Partai Bulan Bintang	Crescent Star Party	Nominee: Prabowo Subianto (Gerindra); Running mate: Hatta Rajasa (PAN)	Majority coalition: Gerindra/Golkar/PPP/PKS/PAN/Demokrat 353 / 560	63.04%	59.12%
PD	Partai Demokrat	Democratic Party*	Nominee: Prabowo Subianto (Gerindra); Running mate: Hatta Rajasa (PAN)	Majority coalition: Gerindra/Golkar/PPP/PKS/PAN/Demokrat 353 / 560	63.04%	59.12%
PDI-P	Partai Demokrasi Indonesia Perjuangan	Indonesian Democratic Party of Struggle	Nominee: Joko Widodo (PDI-P); Running mate: Jusuf Kalla (Golkar)	Minority coalition: PDI-P/Hanura/NasDem/PKB 207 / 560	36.96%	40.88%
Hanura	Partai Hati Nurani Rakyat	People's Conscience Party	Nominee: Joko Widodo (PDI-P); Running mate: Jusuf Kalla (Golkar)	Minority coalition: PDI-P/Hanura/NasDem/PKB 207 / 560	36.96%	40.88%
NasDem	Partai NasDem	NasDem Party	Nominee: Joko Widodo (PDI-P); Running mate: Jusuf Kalla (Golkar)	Minority coalition: PDI-P/Hanura/NasDem/PKB 207 / 560	36.96%	40.88%
PKB	Partai Kebangkitan Bangsa	National Awakening Party	Nominee: Joko Widodo (PDI-P); Running mate: Jusuf Kalla (Golkar)	Minority coalition: PDI-P/Hanura/NasDem/PKB 207 / 560	36.96%	40.88%
PKPI	Partai Keadilan dan Persatuan Indonesia	Indonesian Justice and Unity Party	Nominee: Joko Widodo (PDI-P); Running mate: Jusuf Kalla (Golkar)	Minority coalition: PDI-P/Hanura/NasDem/PKB 207 / 560	36.96%	40.88%

- Parties that are in light grey shows that they do not pass the 2014 Parliamentary Threshold of 2.5% of the national legislative vote. They were also initially barred participation in the next election for the same reason.
- The leader of Democratic Party and sitting President Susilo Bambang Yudhoyono was officially neutral in the election.

== Candidates ==
=== Nominees ===
1
Red-White Coalition ticket
Prabowo Subianto	Hatta Rajasa
for President	for Vice President
Commander of Army Strategic Reserve Command (1998); 2009 vice-presidential nominee	Coordinating Minister for Economic Affairs (2009–2014)
Campaign

2
Great Indonesia Coalition ticket
Joko Widodo	Jusuf Kalla
for President	for Vice President
Governor of Jakarta (2012–2014); Mayor of Surakarta (2005–2012)	10th Vice President of Indonesia (2004–2009)
Campaign

=== Previously considered potential ===
Before the national legislative elections on 9 April 2014, the following candidates had declared their intention to run for president. Following the legislative elections, these candidates were unable to reach the threshold.

Party	Candidate	Details
Golkar	Aburizal Bakrie	Chairman of the Golkar party. Formerly, there had been discontent in some quarters within the party about Bakrie's candidature. There had been some talk of a possible move to reconsider the decision to nominate him. However, Golkar appears united behind him as the official candidate, although some members (especially in Eastern Indonesian region) defect to support Jusuf Kalla
Hanura	Wiranto	Former Commander of the Indonesian Armed Forces, 2004 presidential nominee, and 2009 vice-presidential nominee
Crescent Star Party	Yusril Ihza Mahendra	Former chairman of the Crescent Star Party (PBB). A top lawyer and a specialist in government laws of Indonesia.
United Development Party	Suryadharma Ali	Chairman of the United Development Party (PPP). Recently been announced official suspect by the Corruption Eradication Commission (KPK) on the case of Umroh budget corruption.

== Polling ==
NOTE: The quality of polling in Indonesia varies considerably. Furthermore, some of the polling institutions provide little information about their polling methods. The data set out below should therefore be treated with care.

Polls conducted before nominations

Pollster	Date	Highlights
Soegeng Sarjadi Syndicate (SSS)	3–8 October 2011	Prabowo Subianto 28%, Mahfud MD 10.6%, Sri Mulyani Indrawati 7.4%, Aburizal Bakrie 6.8%, Said Akil Siradj 6%, Muhammad Sirajuddin Syamsuddin 5.2%, Pramono Edhie Wibowo 4.2%, Jusuf Kalla 4.0%, Djoko Suyanto 3.2%, Hatta Rajasa 2.8%, Surya Paloh 2.5%.
Jaringan Suara Indonesia (JSI)	10–15 October 2011	Megawati Soekarnoputri 19.6%, Prabowo Subianto 10.8%, Aburizal Bakrie 8.9%, Wiranto 7.3%, Hamengkubuwono X 6.5%, Hidayat Nur Wahid 3.8%, Surya Paloh 2.3%, Sri Mulyani Indrawati 2.0%, Kristiani Herawati 1.6%, Hatta Rajasa 1.6%, Anas Urbaningrum 1.5%, Sutanto 0.2%, Djoko Suyanto 0.2%.
Reform Institute	October 2011	Aburizal Bakrie 13.58%, Prabowo Subianto 8.46%, Jusuf Kalla 7.06%, Hidayat Nur Wahid 5.17%, Kristiani Herawati 4.13%.
Center for Policy Studies and Strategic Development (Puskaptis)	22 January – 2 February 2012	Prabowo Subianto 16.4%, Hatta Rajasa 14.6%, Aburizal Bakrie 13.5%, Megawati Soekarnoputri 13%, Akbar Tandjung 12.7%.
Indonesian Survey Institute (LSI) Archived 27 February 2012 at the Wayback Machine	1–12 February 2012	Megawati Soekarnoputri 22.2%, Prabowo Subianto 16.8%, Aburizal Bakrie 10.9%, Wiranto 10.6%, Hatta Rajasa 5.4%, other names 10.3%, undecided voters 23.8%.
Asia Pacific Association of Political Consultant (APAPC)	March 2012	Prabowo Subianto 20.0%, Aburizal Bakrie 18.0%, Hamengkubuwono X 11.0%, Hatta Rajasa 6%, Kristiani Herawati 6%, Surya Paloh 5%, Mahfud MD 3%, Dahlan Iskan 2% Djoko Suyanto 1%, Pramono Edhie Wibowo 1%, undecided voters 23%.
Asia Pacific Association of Political Consultant (APAPC)	April 2012	Aburizal Bakrie 22.0%, Prabowo Subianto 20.0%, Hamengkubuwono X11.0% Hatta Rajasa 6%, Dahlan Iskan 5%, Kristiani Herawati 4%, Surya Paloh 3%, Mahfud MD 3%, Djoko Suyanto 2%, Pramono Edhie Wibowo 1%, undecided voters 20%
Asia Pacific Association of Political Consultant (APAPC)	May 2012	Prabowo Subianto 20.0%, Aburizal Bakrie 18.0% Hamengkubuwono X 9.0%, Dahlan Iskan 8%, Hatta Rajasa 6% Kristiani Herawati 4%, Mahfud MD 3%, Surya Paloh 2% Djoko Suyanto 1%, Pramono Edhie Wibowo 1%, undecided voters 23%
Soegeng Sarjadi Syndicate (SSS)	14–24 May 2012	Prabowo Subianto 25.8%, Megawati Soekarnoputri 22.4%, Jusuf Kalla 14.9%, Aburizal Bakrie 10.6%, Surya Paloh 5.3%, Wiranto 4.6%, Hamengkubuwono X 3.7%, Sri Mulyani Indrawati 2.1%, Hidayat Nur Wahid 1.8%, Kristiani Herawati 1.8%, Akbar Tanjung 1.3%, Djoko Suyanto 1.0%, Pramono Edhie Wibowo 0.9%.
Asia Pacific Association of Political Consultant (APAPC)	June 2012	Prabowo Subianto 21.0%, Aburizal Bakrie 17.0%, Kristiani Herawati 10%, Hamengkubuwono X 9.0%, Dahlan Iskan 7%, Mahfud MD 5%, Hatta Rajasa 4%, Surya Paloh 3% Djoko Suyanto 1%, Pramono Edhie Wibowo 1%, undecided voters 20%
Indonesian Survey Circle (LSI)	2–11 June 2012	Megawati Soekarnoputri 18.3%, Prabowo Subianto 18.0%, Aburizal Bakrie 17.5%, Hatta Rajasa 6.8%, Kristiani Herawati 6.5%.
National Survey Institute	10–20 June 2012	Megawati Soekarnoputri 18.0%, Prabowo Subianto 17.4%, Aburizal Bakrie 17.1%, Wiranto 10.2%, Mahfud MD 7.3%.
Asia Pacific Association of Political Consultant (APAPC)	July 2012	Prabowo Subianto 20.1%, Aburizal Bakrie 19.4%, Hamengkubuwono X 8.6%, Kristiani Herawati 6.8%, Hatta Rajasa 6.4%, Dahlan Iskan 5.6%, Mahfud MD 3.6%, Surya Paloh 3% Djoko Suyanto 1.5%, Pramono Edhie Wibowo 0.9%, undecided voters 20.3%
Asia Pacific Association of Political Consultant (APAPC)	August 2012	Prabowo Subianto 20.0%, Aburizal Bakrie 17.0%, Dahlan Iskan 9.0%, Hamengkubuwono X 9.0%, Kristiani Herawati 9.0%,
United Data Centre	3–18 January 2013	Joko Widodo 21.2%, Prabowo Subianto 17.1%, Megawati Soekarnoputri 11.5%, Rhoma Irama 10.4%, Aburizal Bakrie 9.4%, Jusuf Kalla 7.1%
Asia Pacific Association of Political Consultant (APAPC)	February 2013	Prabowo Subianto 17.0%, Aburizal Bakrie 17.0%, Megawati Soekarnoputri 11.0%, Jusuf Kalla 9.0%, Dahlan Iskan 7.0% Hamengkubuwono X 5.0%, Kristiani Herawati 5.0%, Hatta Rajasa 5.0%, Mahfud MD 4.0%, Sri Mulyani Indrawati 2.0%, Djoko Suyanto 1.0%, Gita Wirjawan 1.0%, Pramono Edhie Wibowo 1.0%, Surya Paloh 1.0% undecided voters 12.0%
Jakarta Survey Institute	9–15 February 2013	Joko Widodo 18.1%, Prabowo Subianto 10.9%, Wiranto 9.8%, Jusuf Kalla 8.9%, Aburizal Bakrie 8.7%, Megawati Soekarnoputri 7.2%, Mahfud MD 5.4%, Dahlan Iskan 3.6%, Hatta Rajasa 2.9%, Surya Paloh 2.5%, Rhoma Irama 1.7%, Muhaimin Iskandar 1.1% other names 0.8%
Indonesian Survey Circle (LSI)	1–8 March 2013	Megawati Soekarnoputri 20.7%, Aburizal Bakrie 20.3% Prabowo Subianto 19.2%, Wiranto 8.2%, Hatta Rajasa 6.4%, Kristiani Herawati 2.4%, Surya Paloh 2.1% Suryadharma Ali 1.9%, Anis Matta 1.1%, Muhaimin Iskandar 1.6%,
Indonesia Network Election Survey (INES)	18–30 March 2013	Prabowo Subianto 39.8%, Megawati Soekarnoputri 17.2%, Hatta Rajasa 14.4%, Aburizal Bakrie 10.3%, Kristiani Herawati 5.1%, Jusuf Kalla 4.2%, Wiranto 3.3%, Pramono Edhie Wibowo 3.3%, Djoko Suyanto 1%, Surya Paloh 0.7%, Sutiyoso 0.7%
Political Climatology Institute	20–30 March 2013	Prabowo Subianto 19.8%, Wiranto 15.4%, Megawati Soekarnoputri 13.3%, Kristiani Herawati 4.8%, Hatta Rajasa 3.9%, Surya Paloh 3.8%, Sutiyoso 2.7%, Yusril Ihza Mahendra 2.5%, Muhaimin Iskandar 1.8%, Anis Matta 1.3%, Suryadaharma Ali 1.1%, undecided voters 11.4%
Centre for Strategic and International Studies (CSIS)	9–16 April 2013	Joko Widodo 28.6%, Prabowo Subianto 15.6%, Aburizal Bakrie 7%, Megawati Soekarnoputri 5.4%, Jusuf Kalla 3.7%, Mahfud MD 2.4%, Hatta Rajasa 2.2% undecided voters 28.0%
Indonesian Institute of Sciences	10–31 May 2013	Joko Widodo 22.6%, Prabowo Subianto 14.2%, Aburizal Bakrie 9.4%, Megawati Soekarnoputri 9.3%, Jusuf Kalla 4.2%, Rhoma Irama 3.5%, Wiranto 3.4%, Mahfud MD 1.9%, Hatta Rajasa 1.2%, Hamengkubuwono X 1.2%, Surya Paloh 1.2%
Indonesian Research Centre	May 2013	Joko Widodo 24.8%, Prabowo Subianto 14.8%, Aburizal Bakrie 7.9%, Megawati Soekarnoputri 5.5%, Wiranto 3.9%, Mahfud MD 3.7%, Dahlan Iskan 3.5%, Rhoma Irama 2.7%, Hary Tanoesodibjo 2.3%, Kristiani Herawati 2%
United Data Center	8–11 June 2013	Joko Widodo 29.57%, Prabowo Subianto 19.83%, Megawati Soekarnoputri 13.08%, Aburizal Bakrie 11.62% Jusuf Kalla 5.47%, Wiranto 3.59%, Mahfud MD 1.2%, Hatta Rajasa 1.2%, Dahlan Iskan 1.11%, Chairul Tanjung 0.43%, Marzuki Alie 0.26%, Djoko Suyanto 0.09%, Pramono Edhie Wibowo 0.09%
Soegeng Sarjadi Syndicate	3–22 July 2013	Joko Widodo 25.48%, Prabowo Subianto 10.52%, Jusuf Kalla 5.69%, Aburizal Bakrie 4.23%, Dahlan Iskan 4.18%, Mahfud MD 2.72, Megawati Soekarnoputri 2.68%. Wiranto 1.18%, Hidayat Nur Wahid 1.02%, Hatta Rajasa 0.81%, Chairul Tanjung 0.53%, Surya Paloh 0.33%, Hamengkubuwono X 0.33%, Sri Mulyani Indrawati 0.2%, Kristiani Herawati 0.2%, Pramono Edhie Wibowo 0.12%
Indonesian Research Centre	8–11 July 2013	Joko Widodo 32.0%, Prabowo Subianto 8.2%, Wiranto 6.7%, Dahlan Iskan 6.3%, Megawati Soekarnoputri 6.1%, Jusuf Kalla 3.7%, Aburizal Bakrie 3.3%, Mahfud MD 2.8%,
Kompas	July 2013	Joko Widodo 32.5%, Prabowo Subianto 15.1%, Aburizal Bakrie 8.8%, Megawati Soekarnoputri 8.0%, Jusuf Kalla 4.5%, other names 18.2%, undecided 12.9%
Political Climatology Institute Archived 23 August 2014 at the Wayback Machine	12–18 August 2013	Joko Widodo 19.6%, Wiranto 18.5%, Prabowo Subianto 15.4%, Jusuf Kalla 7.6%, Aburizal Bakrie 7.3%, Megawati Soekarnoputri 6.1%, Dahlan Iskan 3.4%, Rhoma Irama 3.4%, Mahfud MD 3.3%, Hatta Rajasa 2.5%, Surya Paloh 2.4%, other names 1.3%, undecided 9.1%
Alvara Research Centre	15–23 August 2013	Joko Widodo 22.1%, Prabowo Subianto 17.0%, Jusuf Kalla 7.4%, Megawati Soekarnoputri 7.0%, Dahlan Iskan 6.9%, Aburizal Bakrie 6.2%, Wiranto 4.6%, Mahfud MD 4.0%, Surya Paloh 2.0%, Hatta Rajasa 1.0%, Hamengkubuwono X 0.9%, other names 1.0%, undecided 19.0%
Cyrus Network	23 – 28 August 2013	Joko Widodo 27.1%, Prabowo Subianto 14.4%, Aburizal Bakrie 12.0%, Wiranto 7.5%, Megawati Soekarnoputri 4.9%, Jusuf Kalla 3.2%
Soegeng Sarjadi Syndicate	25 August – 9 September 2013	Joko Widodo 45.8%, Jusuf Kalla 9.0%, Dahlan Iskan 7.5%, Prabowo Subianto 6.8%, Mahfud MD 5.8%, Wiranto 3.6%, Aburizal Bakrie 2.4%, Megawati Soekarnoputri 1.8%, Chairul Tanjung 1.6%, Hatta Rajasa 1.0%, Hidayat Nur Wahid 0.7%, Surya Paloh 0.5%, Hamengkubuwono X 0.5%, Sri Mulyani Indrawati 0.4%, Kristiani Herawati 0.4%, Pramono Edhie Wibowo 0.4%, other names 1.0%, undecided 10.8%
Cyrus Network	12 – 14 September 2013	Joko Widodo 43.7%, Prabowo Subianto 14.0%, Aburizal Bakrie 12.5%, Wiranto 7.3%, Megawati Soekarnoputri 4.9%, Jusuf Kalla 4.6%
United Data Centre	21–24 September 2013	Joko Widodo 36.0%, Prabowo Subianto 6.6%, Dahlan Iskan 5.5%, Wiranto 4.6%, Jusuf Kalla 4.0%
Indonesia Research Centre (IRC) Archived 9 January 2014 at the Wayback Machine	25 September 2013	Joko Widodo 34.5%, Wiranto 10.6%, Aburizal Bakrie 8.1%, Jusuf Kalla 6.2%. Megawati Soekarnoputri 6%, Surya Paloh 3.3%, Rhoma Irama 3.2%, Dahlan Iskan 2.8%, Mahfud MD 2%, Hidayat Nur Wahid 1.5%, Hatta Rajasa 1.3%, Suryadharma Ali 1.2%, Yusril Ihza Mahendra 0.9%, Pramono Edhie Wibowo 0.9%, Gita Wirjawan 0.4%, Irman Gusman 0.2%, Other Names 0.4%, undecided 6.9%, secret answer 1%
Pol Tracking Institute	13 September – 11 October 2013	Joko Widodo 37.6%, Prabowo Subianto 11.73%, Aburizal Bakrie 11.67%%, Jusuf Kalla 6.12%. Wiranto 5.78%, Megawati Soekarnoputri 3.31%, Mahfud MD2.17%, Hidayat Nur Wahid 1.5%, Hatta Rajasa 1.33%, Surya Paloh 1.17%, Dahlan Iskan 1.09%, undecided 14.52%
Alvara Research Centre	October 2013	Joko Widodo 24.5%, Prabowo Subianto 9.1%, Aburizal Bakrie 7.4%, Wiranto 6.8%, Megawati Soekarnoputri 6.7%, Jusuf Kalla 4.2%, Dahlan Iskan 2.7%, Rhoma Irama 1.9%, Mahfud MD 1.2%, Surya Paloh 2.0%, Hatta Rajasa 1.1%, other names 3.8%, undecided 30.6%
Roy Morgan Research	October 2013	Joko Widodo 37%, Prabowo Subianto 15%, Aburizal Bakrie 14%, Megawati Soekarnoputri 6%, Dahlan Iskan 6%, Jusuf Kalla 5%, Mahfud MD 3%, Hatta Rajasa 2%, other names 12%
Indikator Politik Indonesia	10 – 20 October 2013	Joko Widodo 35.9%, Prabowo Subianto 11.4%, Aburizal Bakrie 11.4%, Wiranto 7.8%, Megawati Soekarnoputri 5.9%, Jusuf Kalla 3.9%, Mahfud MD 1.2%, Dahlan Iskan 1.0%
Indikator Politik Indonesia – 4 way race	10 – 20 October 2013	Joko Widodo 47.4%, Prabowo Subianto 15.8%, Aburizal Bakrie 12.6%, Dahlan Iskan 3.7%
Charta Politika	28 November – 6 December 2013	Joko Widodo 34.8%, Prabowo Subianto 11.2%, Aburizal Bakrie 8.3%, Jusuf Kalla 5.4%, Wiranto 5.2%, Megawati Soekarnoputri 2.8%,
Kompas	27 November – 11 December 2013	Joko Widodo 43.5%, Prabowo Subianto 11.1%, Aburizal Bakrie 9.2%, Wiranto 6.3%, Megawati Soekarnoputri 6.1%, Jusuf Kalla 3.1%, other names 9.8%, undecided 10.9%
Indo Barometer	4–15 December 2013	Joko Widodo 25.2%, Aburizal Bakrie 10.5%, Prabowo Subianto 9.7%, Wiranto 6.1%, Megawati Soekarnoputri 6%,
Survei dan Polling Indonesia (SPIN) Institute	15 December 2013 – 10 January 2014	Prabowo Subianto 26.5%, Aburizal Bakrie 17.7%, Megawati Soekarnoputri 14.6%, Wiranto 11.8%
Indonesia Network Election Survey (INES)	1–14 February 2014	Prabowo Subianto 40.8%, Megawati Soekarnoputri 19.5%, Aburizal Bakrie 11.3%, Dahlan Iskan 6.9%, Wiranto 6.3%, Joko Widodo 5.6%, Hatta Rajasa 2.4%, Jusuf Kalla 2.2%, Surya Paloh 1.7%, Pramono Edhie Wibowo 1.3%, Ani Yudhoyono 1.1%, Sutiyoso 0.9%
Roy Morgan Research	February 2014	Joko Widodo 40%, Prabowo Subianto 17%, Aburizal Bakrie 11%, Wiranto 7%, Jusuf Kalla 5%, Megawati Soekarnoputri 4%, Dahlan Iskan 4%, Mahfud MD 3%, Hatta Rajasa 2%, other names 7%

NOTE: See cautionary note at the top of this table.

== Timeline ==
NOTE: The following timeline refers to some dates which refer to the national parliamentary elections due in mid-2014 as well as other events in addition to the presidential election. These dates are noted because events leading up to the national parliamentary elections will, in the minds of voters and party organisers, be closely linked to the presidential election.

Date	Event	Remarks
Jan 2014	Preparations	During January and February the Democrat Party held public meetings in main towns in Indonesia to allow the main candidates for the Democrat Party nomination to test their support.
March	Campaigning	Nationwide campaigning for the national legislative (parliamentary and assembly) elections
6–8 April	Cooling-off period	
9 April	Legislative elections	Simultaneous national elections for the national parliament (DPR, 560 seats), 33 provincial assemblies (DPRD I, 2,137 seats) and 497 district (kabupaten and kota) assemblies (DPRD II, 17,560 seats); See also: 2014 Indonesian legislative election
9 May	Results	Results of the legislative elections are required to be announced within 30 days of the polling day.
Early May	Nomination	The names of all candidates running (jointly) for the positions of president and vice president must be formally logged at the Indonesian Electoral Commission within seven days after the results of the legislative elections are announced (see above).
31 May	Announcement	The KPU announce the names of the presidential candidates
4 June – 5 July	Campaigning	Nationwide campaign by presidential candidates
6–8 July	Cooling-off period	No campaign of any form is allowed
9 July	Election	Presidential election
10–12 July	Recapitulation	At the sub-district level
10–14 July	Recapitulation	For ballots from abroad
13–15 July	Recapitulation	At the district level
16–17 July	Recapitulation	At the municipality/regency level
18–19 July	Recapitulation	At the province level
20–22 July	Recapitulation	At the national level
22–23 July	Results	Results of the presidential election are required to be announced within 14 days of the polling day.
20 October	Inauguration	Susilo Bambang Yudhoyono completes his term and the seventh president is sworn in

== Counting and results ==
Following the election on 9 July 2014, Joko Widodo announced his victory based on quick counts of votes from several zones; most of these independent pollsters indicated a Joko Widodo victory (52–53% of votes to Prabowo's 46–48%). Prabowo also claimed victory, citing other polls. As the official count continued, the KPU released scans of the tally (C1) forms from each polling station on its official website, allowing downloads of the official data.

In the lead up to the official announcement of the official results by the KPU, Prabowo pushed for the Commission to delay the announcement by two weeks, allowing his party to investigate claimed manipulations of the voting process. This request was denied. The Prabowo camp also called for a new vote in some zones. However, several Prabowo supporters congratulated Joko Widodo on his election or conceded the election. PAN politician Hanafi Rais, writing three days before the results were announced, sent a press release which stated: "We congratulate Bapak Joko Widodo and Jusuf Kalla — who will helm the national leadership for the next five years". The same day, Prabowo's campaign manager Mahfud MD returned his mandate to Prabowo, stating that the election was over; he was replaced by Lt. Gen. Yunus Yosfiah on 22 July 2014.

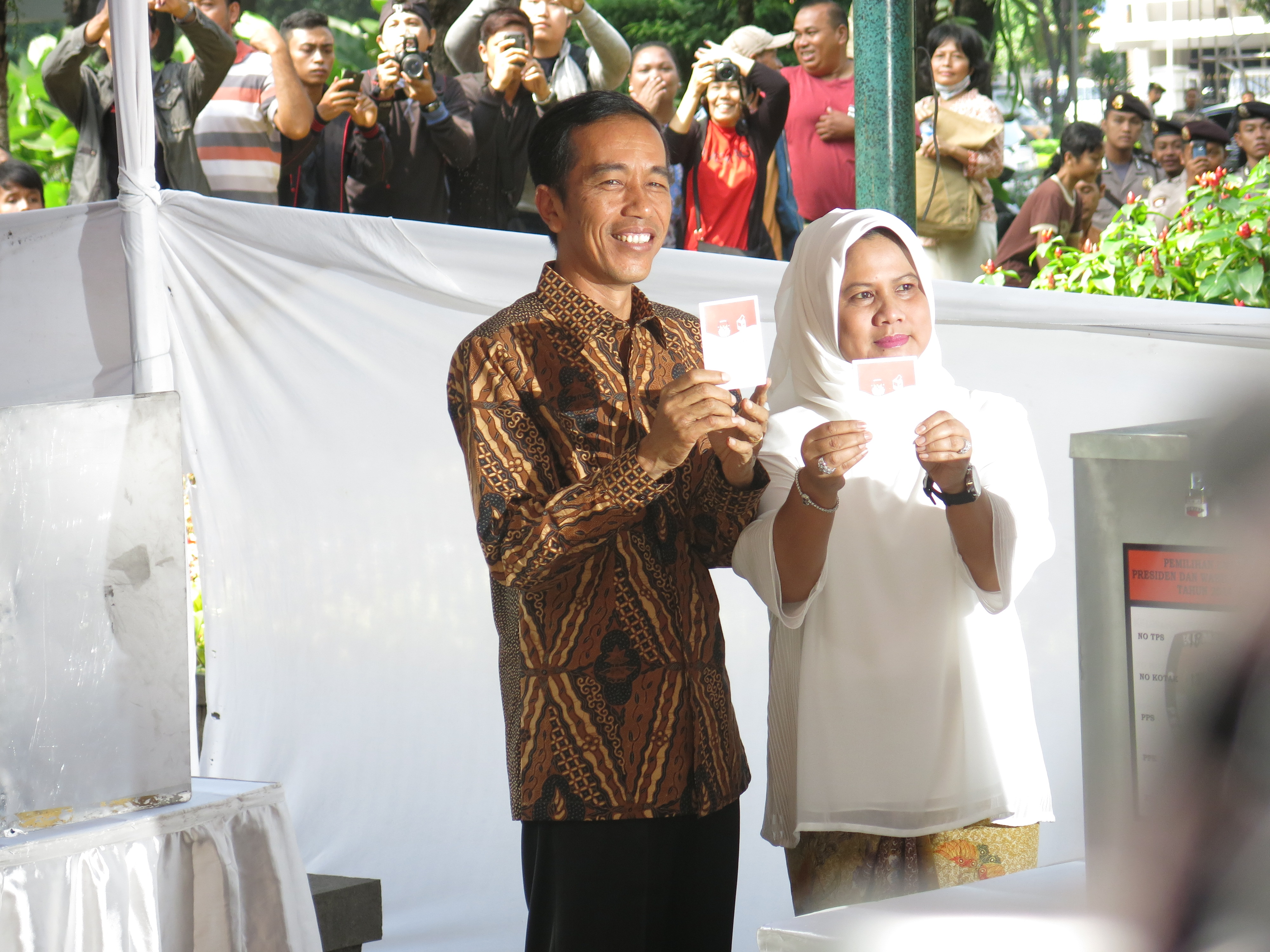
Joko Widodo votes in Indonesia's 2014 presidential election

Out of fear that inter-party tension could lead to riots such as those which led to the downfall of former president Suharto, the Indonesian government deployed over 250,000 police officers throughout the country. In central Jakarta, hundreds of police were stationed – particularly around the KPU's offices. Following bomb threats against Jakarta City Hall, after the KPU's announcement military officials tightened security around it Commission's headquarters. A group of Prabowo supporters staged a non-violent protest near the offices.

=== Prabowo's withdrawal ===
On 22 July 2014, the day that the KPU was due to announce its official tally, Prabowo withdrew from the recapitulation process after having insisted on his victory since the initial quick counts were released. He attributed this withdrawal to Indonesia "failing in its duty to democracy" because of "massive cheating that is structured and systematic", and stated that he and Hatta "exercise our constitutional right to reject the presidential election and declare it unconstitutional". His speech, aired live, implied that he would challenge the results in the Constitutional Court (Mahkamah Konstitusi). Later reports indicated confusion over whether Prabowo had resigned from the election or simply rejected the count.

According to Douglas Ramage, Managing Director for Indonesia at BowerGroupAsia, this was the first time since reformasi (the Reformation) began in 1998 that the legitimacy of the election process has been questioned; he declared that the country was entering "uncharted territory". The legality of a Prabowo challenge is questionable, as – if he withdrew – he is no longer considered a presidential candidate. If he can make the challenge, according to The Jakarta Post, the gap between the two candidates is sufficient to make such a challenge difficult. Under the presidential election law, Prabowo could face up to six years in prison and a 100 billion rupiah ($10 million) fine for withdrawing.

Following the announcement, the value of the Indonesian rupiah dropped by 0.3%, and the JSX Composite fell by 0.9%. Observers denied Prabowo's allegations of cheating, finding that the elections were "generally fair and free"; Maswadi Rauf of the University of Indonesia stated that there was "no sign of significant fraud", and that Prabowo's withdrawal simply reflected "the real attitudes of the elite, who are not yet ready to accept losing".

=== Announcement and reaction ===
After Prabowo's withdrawal, his witnesses also left the announcement ceremony. However, the official tally continued; the Commission chief, Husni Kamil Manik, said that they had already fulfilled their obligations by inviting the witnesses. A victory for Joko Widodo was expected, and realised hours later, although the initially planned 4:00 p.m. announcement was delayed for four hours. The KPU gave Joko Widodo a victory of 53.15% of the vote (representing 70.99 million voters), to Prabowo's 46.85% (62.57 million votes). This was the closest vote in the history of free elections in the country; the two previous elections, in 2004 and 2009, had been landslide victories for Yudhoyono.

The Prabowo camp continued to reject the KPU's count, announcing that they trusted the count provided by the PKS, which gave a Prabowo victory, more than the Commission's. Prabowo's camp later stated that it intended to report the KPU to the police for continuing its recapitulation despite calls for a delay and questions of the vote's validity.

After the announcement, Joko Widodo stated that growing up under the authoritarian and corrupt New Order, he would have never expected someone with a lower-class background to become president. The New York Times reported him as saying, "now, it's quite similar to America, yes? There is the American dream, and here we have the Indonesian dream.". Joko Widodo was the first Indonesian president to not be from the military or the political elite, and the political commentator Salim Said gave the popular view of the politician "someone who is our neighbour, who decided to get into politics and run for president".

The Singaporean prime minister, Lee Hsien Loong, posted his congratulations on Twitter minutes after the election, expressing hope that Joko Widodo would work towards improving relations between the two countries. Tony Abbott, Prime Minister of Australia, stated that Joko Widodo's election was a "milestone" for the development of democracy in Indonesia, and stated his hope that the two countries' relations could be reinforced following a decline caused by espionage scandals and human trafficking. US President Barack Obama also congratulated Jokowi and is also willing to improve relations between Indonesia and the US. However, Prabowo asked for world leaders to withhold congratulatory statements to Jokowi.

==== Appeal ====
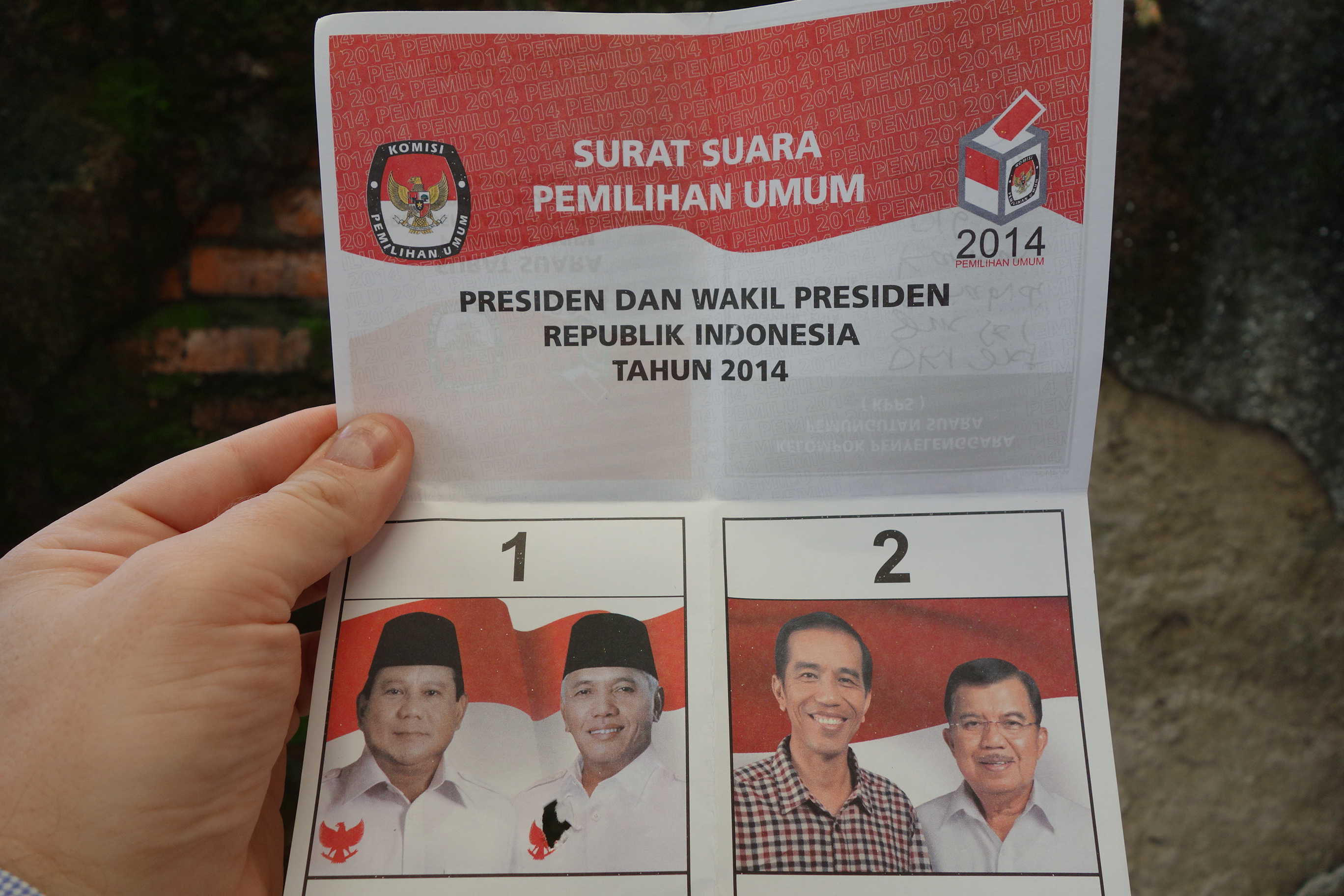
A voting ballot just after the official closing of elections at a voting station in Jakarta. The ballot is punched at section 1 (in favour of Prabowo Subianto)

A member of the Prabowo-Hatta campaign team outlined the eight final moves that Prabowo plans to take to overturn the election result. These are:

1. File a lawsuit over the election result with the Constitutional Court
2. Report alleged ethical violations by the KPU to the Election Organisers Ethics Council (DKPP).
3. File a report with the Election Supervisory Committee (Panwaslu).
4. Report electoral violations to the police.
5. Making a report to the Ombudsman.
6. File a report with the State Administrative Court (PTUN) asking for the KPU on the election result to be annulled.
7. Political manoeuvring within the People's Representative Council (DPR) by establishing a Presidential Election Special Committee to evaluate the performance of the KPU. The manoeuvring was done by parties within Prabowo-Hatta's coalition.
8. A class action.

Prabowo Subianto took an appeal against the election result to the Constitutional Court of Indonesia, alleging "structured, systematic and massive" violations and that up to 24.1 million votes were "troubled". The first hearing was on 6 August. Hundreds of supporters were present outside the court. On 21 August the court delivered a unanimous 9–0 verdict in favour of rejecting all aspects of the appeal. A spokesperson for Subianto stated that his team did not consider the ruling fair, but they would accept the court's judgement. On the same day, the Election Organizers Ethics Council (DKPP) ruled that there had been some ethical violations. Of the nine local election commissioners dismissed for taking bribes, four of them took money from Prabowo's Gerindra Party.

=== Official results ===
Candidate	Running mate	Party	Votes	%
Joko Widodo	Jusuf Kalla	Indonesian Democratic Party of Struggle	70,997,833	53.15
Prabowo Subianto	Hatta Rajasa	Gerindra Party	62,576,444	46.85
Total			133,574,277	100.00
Valid votes			133,574,277	98.98
Invalid/blank votes			1,379,690	1.02
Total votes			134,953,967	100.00
Registered voters/turnout			193,944,150	69.58
Source: KPU

==== National ====
Votes by province						Total votes
Votes by province		Prabowo Subianto Gerindra		Joko Widodo PDI-P		Total votes
Votes by province		Votes	%	Votes	%	Total votes
Sumatra	Aceh	1,089,290	54.93	913,309	45.61	2,002,599
Sumatra	North Sumatra	2,831,514	44.76	3,494,835	55.24	6,326,349
Sumatra	West Sumatra	1,797,505	76.92	539,308	23.09	2,336,813
Sumatra	Riau	1,349,338	50.12	1,342,817	49.88	2,692,155
Sumatra	Jambi	871,316	49.25	897,787	50.75	1,769,103
Sumatra	South Sumatra	2,132,163	51.26	2,027,049	48.74	4,159,212
Sumatra	Bengkulu	433,173	45.27	523,669	54.73	956,842
Sumatra	Lampung	2,033,924	46.93	2,299,889	53.07	4,333,813
Sumatra	Bangka Belitung Islands	200,706	32.74	412,359	67.26	613,065
Sumatra	Riau Islands	332,908	40.37	491,819	59.63	824,727
Java	Banten	3,192,671	57.10	2,398,631	42.90	5,591,302
Java	Jakarta	2,528,064	46.92	2,859,894	53.08	5,387,958
Java	West Java	14,167,381	59.78	9,530,315	40.22	23,697,696
Java	Central Java	6,485,720	33.35	12,959,540	66.65	19,445,260
Java	Yogyakarta	977,342	44.19	1,234,249	55.81	2,211,591
Java	East Java	10,277,088	46.83	11,669,313	53.17	21,946,401
Kalimantan	West Kalimantan	1,032,354	39.62	1,573,046	60.38	2,605,400
Kalimantan	Central Kalimantan	468,277	40.21	696,199	59.79	1,164,476
Kalimantan	South Kalimantan	941,809	50.05	939,748	49.95	1,881,557
Kalimantan	East Kalimantan (Note: including North Kalimantan)	687,734	36.62	1,190,156	63.38	1,877,890
Lesser Sunda	Bali	614,241	28.58	1,535,110	71.42	2,149,351
Lesser Sunda	West Nusa Tenggara	1,844,178	72.45	701,238	27.55	2,545,416
Lesser Sunda	East Nusa Tenggara	769,391	34.08	1,488,076	65.92	2,257,467
Sulawesi	North Sulawesi	620,095	46.12	724,553	53.81	1,344,648
Sulawesi	Gorontalo	378,735	63.10	221,497	36.90	600,232
Sulawesi	Central Sulawesi	632,009	45.13	767,151	54.87	1,399,160
Sulawesi	Southeast Sulawesi	511,134	45.10	622,217	54.90	1,133,351
Sulawesi	West Sulawesi	165,494	26.63	456,021	73.37	621,515
Sulawesi	South Sulawesi	1,214,857	28.57	3,037,026	71.43	4,251,883
Maluku	Maluku	433,981	49.48	443,040	50.52	877,021
Maluku	North Maluku	306,792	54.45	256,601	45.55	563,393
Papua	Papua	769,132	27.51	2,026,735	72.49	2,795,867
Papua	West Papua	172,528	32.37	360,379	67.63	532,907
At-large		62,262,844	46.85	70,633,576	53.15	132,896,420

==== Overseas ====
Votes by countries						Total votes
Votes by countries		Prabowo Subianto Gerindra		Joko Widodo PDI-P		Total votes
Votes by countries		Votes	%	Votes	%	Total votes
Afghanistan	Kabul	14	36.84	24	63.16	38
Algeria	Algiers	355	51.82	330	48.18	685
Argentina	Buenos Aires	44	23.53	143	76.47	187
Australia	Canberra, ACT	114	20.11	453	79.89	567
Australia	Darwin, NT	108	25.41	317	74.59	425
Australia	Melbourne, Vic	778	12.21	5,594	87.79	6,372
Australia	Perth, WA	547	15.06	3,084	84.94	3,631
Australia	Sydney, NSW	1,505	13.31	9,799	86.69	11,304
Australia	At-large	2,652	12.11	19,247	87.89	21,899
Austria	Vienna	87	20.23	343	79.77	430
Azerbaijan	Baku	23	33.33	46	66.67	69
Bahrain	Manama	213	52.46	193	47.54	406
Bangladesh	Dhaka	85	45.21	103	54.79	188
Belgium	Brussels	156	19.50	644	80.50	800
Bosnia and Herzegovina	Sarajevo	9	34.62	17	65.38	26
Brazil	Brasília	30	43.48	39	56.52	69
Brunei	Bandar Seri Begawan	2,825	42.99	3,746	57.01	6,571
Bulgaria	Sofia	15	27.78	39	72.22	54
Cambodia	Phnom Penh	326	29.05	796	70.95	1,122
Canada	Ottawa	70	21.59	270	79.41	340
Canada	Toronto	188	13.49	1,206	86.51	122
Canada	Vancouver	171	12.46	1,201	87.54	1,372
Canada	At-large	429	13.81	2,677	86.19	3,106
Chile	Santiago	13	11.93	96	88.07	109
China	Beijing	90	10.10	801	89.90	891
China	Guangzhou	125	9.10	1,248	90.90	1,373
China	Hong Kong SAR	10,728	25.74	30,956	74.26	41,684
China	Shanghai	98	11.05	789	88.95	887
China	At-large (Mainland China)	313	9.93	2,838	90.07	3,151
China	At-large (Mainland China+SARs)	11,041	24.63	33,794	75.37	44,835
Colombia	Bogotá	6	8.45	65	91.55	71
Croatia	Zagreb	6	17.14	29	82.86	35
Cuba	Havana	10	35.71	18	64.29	28
Czech Republic	Prague	32	27.35	85	72.65	117
Denmark	Copenhagen	55	15.99	289	84.01	344
East Timor	Dili	1,108	25.96	3,160	74.04	4,268
Ecuador	Quito	6	18.75	26	81.25	32
Egypt	Cairo	1,809	71.81	710	28.19	2,519
Ethiopia	Addis Ababa	23	57.50	17	42.50	40
Finland	Helsinki	31	11.61	236	88.39	267
Fiji	Suva	75	44.91	92	55.09	167
France	Marseille	57	20.88	216	79.12	273
France	Paris	252	19.92	1,013	80.08	1,265
France	At-large	309	20.09	1,229	79.91	1,538
Germany	Berlin	372	29.50	889	70.50	1,261
Germany	Frankfurt	709	17.94	3,242	82.06	3,951
Germany	Hamburg	331	21.72	1,193	78.28	1,524
Germany	At-large	1,412	20.96	5,324	79.04	6,736
Greece	Athens	145	28.94	356	71.06	501
Hungary	Budapest	18	18.00	82	82.00	100
India	Mumbai	210	95.02	11	4.98	221
India	New Delhi	57	33.33	114	66.67	171
India	At-large	267	68.11	125	31.89	392
Iran	Tehran	34	17.53	160	82.47	194
Iraq	Baghdad	167	51.54	157	48.46	324
Italy	Rome	153	20.82	582	79.18	735
Japan	Osaka	746	42.00	1,030	58.00	1,776
Japan	Tokyo	2,103	39.32	3,245	60.68	5,348
Japan	At-large	2,849	40.00	4,275	60.00	7,124
Jordan	Amman	215	70.03	92	29.97	307
Kazakhstan	Astana	17	30.36	39	69.64	56
Kenya	Nairobi	83	32.68	171	67.32	254
Kuwait	Kuwait City	837	55.95	659	44.05	1,496
Laos	Vientiane	72	40.22	107	59.78	179
Lebanon	Beirut	62	50.00	62	50.00	124
Libya	Tripoli	76	71.70	30	28.30	106
Madagascar	Antananarivo	13	29.55	31	70.45	44
Malaysia	Johor Bahru	42,248	61.29	26,681	38.71	68,929
Malaysia	Kota Kinabalu	20,790	41.84	28,905	58.16	49,695
Malaysia	Kuala Lumpur	111,794	84.26	20,891	15.74	132,685
Malaysia	Kuching	33,633	45.62	40,091	54.38	73,724
Malaysia	Penang	10,773	55.02	8,806	44.98	19,579
Malaysia	Tawau	11,933	30.33	27,412	69.67	39,345
Malaysia	At-large	231,171	60.21	152,786	39.79	383,957
Mexico	Mexico City	34	26.36	95	73.64	129
Morocco	Rabat	97	62.18	59	37.82	156
Mozambique	Maputo	35	32.41	73	67.59	108
Myanmar	Yangon	229	52.53	207	47.47	436
Namibia	Windhoek	46	28.22	117	71.78	163
Netherlands	The Hague	770	19.45	3,189	80.55	3,959
New Caledonia	Noumea	71	27.20	190	72.80	261
New Zealand	Wellington	260	14.61	1,519	85.39	1,779
Nigeria	Abuja	184	34.20	354	65.80	538
North Korea	Pyongyang	6	35.29	11	64.71	17
Norway	Oslo	84	17.54	395	82.46	479
Oman	Muscat	444	47.84	484	52.16	928
Pakistan	Islamabad	168	69.71	73	30.29	241
Pakistan	Karachi	71	67.62	34	32.38	105
Pakistan	At-large	239	69.08	107	30.92	346
Panama	Panama City	14	30.43	32	69.57	46
Papua New Guinea	Port Moresby	168	36.92	287	63.08	455
Papua New Guinea	Vanimo	176	30.24	406	69.76	582
Papua New Guinea	At-large	344	33.17	693	66.83	1,037
Peru	Lima	20	25.64	58	74.36	78
Philippines	Davao City	912	52.47	826	47.53	1,738
Philippines	Manila	162	12.67	1,117	87.33	1,279
Philippines	At-large	1,074	35.60	1,943	64.40	3,017
Poland	Warsaw	32	21.92	114	78.08	146
Portugal	Lisbon	22	26.51	61	73.49	83
Qatar	Doha	2,087	56.96	1,577	43.04	3,664
Romania	Bucharest	27	40.30	40	59.70	67
Russia	Moscow	70	26.42	195	73.58	265
Saudi Arabia	Jeddah	5,626	51.22	5,357	48.78	10,983
Saudi Arabia	Riyadh	4,184	49.71	4,233	50.29	8,417
Saudi Arabia	At-large	9,810	50.57	9,590	49.43	19,400
Senegal	Dakar	174	28.16	444	71.84	618
Serbia	Belgrade	12	17.91	55	82.09	67
Singapore		7,639	20.16	30,250	79.84	37,889
Slovakia	Bratislava	24	36.36	42	63.64	66
South Africa	Cape Town	11	15.49	60	84.51	71
South Africa	Pretoria	26	21.31	96	78.69	122
South Africa	At-large	37	18.75	156	81.25	192
South Korea	Seoul	3,018	33.77	5,920	66.23	8,938
Spain	Madrid	140	23.45	457	76.55	597
Sri Lanka	Colombo	37	18.88	159	81.12	196
Sudan	Khartoum	268	73.83	95	26.17	363
Suriname	Paramaribo	87	32.83	178	67.17	265
Sweden	Stockholm	92	20.35	360	79.65	452
Switzerland	Bern	87	15.21	485	84.79	572
Syria	Damascus	185	91.58	17	8.42	202
Taiwan	Taipei	17,525	26.87	47,692	73.13	65,217
Tanzania	Dar es Salaam	14	31.11	31	68.89	45
Thailand	Bangkok	389	35.40	710	64.60	1,099
Thailand	Songkhla	247	34.07	478	65.93	725
Thailand	At-large	636	34.87	1,188	65.13	1,824
Tunisia	Tunis	41	49.40	42	50.60	83
Turkey	Ankara	189	76.21	99	23.79	248
Turkey	Istanbul	135	53.36	118	46.64	253
Turkey	At-large	324	64.67	217	35.33	501
Ukraine	Kyiv	5	9.09	50	90.91	55
United Arab Emirates	Abu Dhabi	1,024	54.15	867	45.85	1,891
United Arab Emirates	Dubai	720	40.89	1,041	59.11	1,761
United Arab Emirates	At-large	1,744	47.75	1,908	52.25	3,652
United Kingdom	London	805	24.79	2,442	75.21	3,247
United States	Chicago, IL	123	15.36	678	84.64	801
United States	Houston, TX	313	13.93	1,934	86.07	2,247
United States	Los Angeles, CA	421	11.97	3,095	88.03	3,516
United States	New York City, NY	866	16.87	4,267	83.13	5,133
United States	San Francisco, CA	1,283	20.89	4,860	79.11	6,143
United States	Washington, D.C.	277	25.39	814	74.61	1,091
United States	At-large	3,283	17.34	15,647	82.66	18,930
Uzbekistan	Tashkent	19	33.93	37	66.07	56
Vatican City		67	7.74	799	92.26	866
Venezuela	Caracas	31	17.71	144	82.29	175
Vietnam	Hanoi	21	14.58	123	85.42	144
Vietnam	Ho Chi Minh City	110	31.61	238	68.39	348
Vietnam	At-large	131	26.68	360	73.32	491
Yemen	Sana'a	1,369	92.25	115	7.75	1,484
Zimbabwe	Harare	167	31.33	366	68.67	533
At-large		313,600	46.26	364,257	53.74	677,857

==== Region ====
Votes by region					Total votes
Votes by region	Prabowo Subianto Gerindra		Joko Widodo PDI-P		Total votes
Votes by region	Votes	%	Votes	%	Total votes
Sumatra	13,071,837	50.25	12,942,841	49.75	26,014,678
Java	37,628,266	48.07	40,651,942	51.93	78,280,208
Kalimantan	3,130,174	41.57	4,399,149	58.43	7,529,323
Lesser Sunda	3,227,810	46.43	3,724,424	53.57	6,952,234
Sulawesi	3,522,324	37.67	5,828,465	62.33	9,350,789
Maluku	740,773	51.43	699,641	48.57	1,440,414
Papua	941,660	28.29	2,387,114	71.71	3,328,774
Overseas	313,600	46.26	364,257	53.74	677,857
Total	62,576,444	46.85	70,997,833	53.15	133,574,277

=== Quick count results ===
Source	Candidate		Error
Source	Prabowo Subianto–Hatta Rajasa	Joko Widodo–Jusuf Kalla	Error
CSIS-Cyrus Network (Liputan6.com)	48.10%	51.90%	1.25%
Indikator Politik Indonesia (MetroTVnews)	47.05%	52.95%	0.20%
Kompas (Litbang)	47.66%	52.34%	0.81%
Lingkaran Survei Indonesia	46.43%	53.57%	0.42%
Poltracking	46.63%	53.37%	0.22%
Populi Center (Suara.com);	49.05%	50.95%	2.20%
Radio Republik Indonesia (antaranews.com)	47.32%	52.68%	0.47%
Saiful Mujani Research Center (SMRC)	47.09%	52.91%	0.24%
Indonesia Research Centre (IRC; okezone.com)	51.11%	48.89%	4.26%
Jaringan Suara Indonesia (JSI; Viva.co.id)	50.13%	49.87%	3.28%
Lembaga Survei Nasional (Viva.co.id)	50.56%	49.44%	3.71%
Puskaptis (Viva.co.id)	52.05%	47.95%	5.20%
Official results	46.85%	53.15%	0.00%
