= First inauguration of Susilo Bambang Yudhoyono =

Inauguration of President-elect Susilo Bambang Yudhoyono

First presidential inauguration of Susilo Bambang Yudhoyono
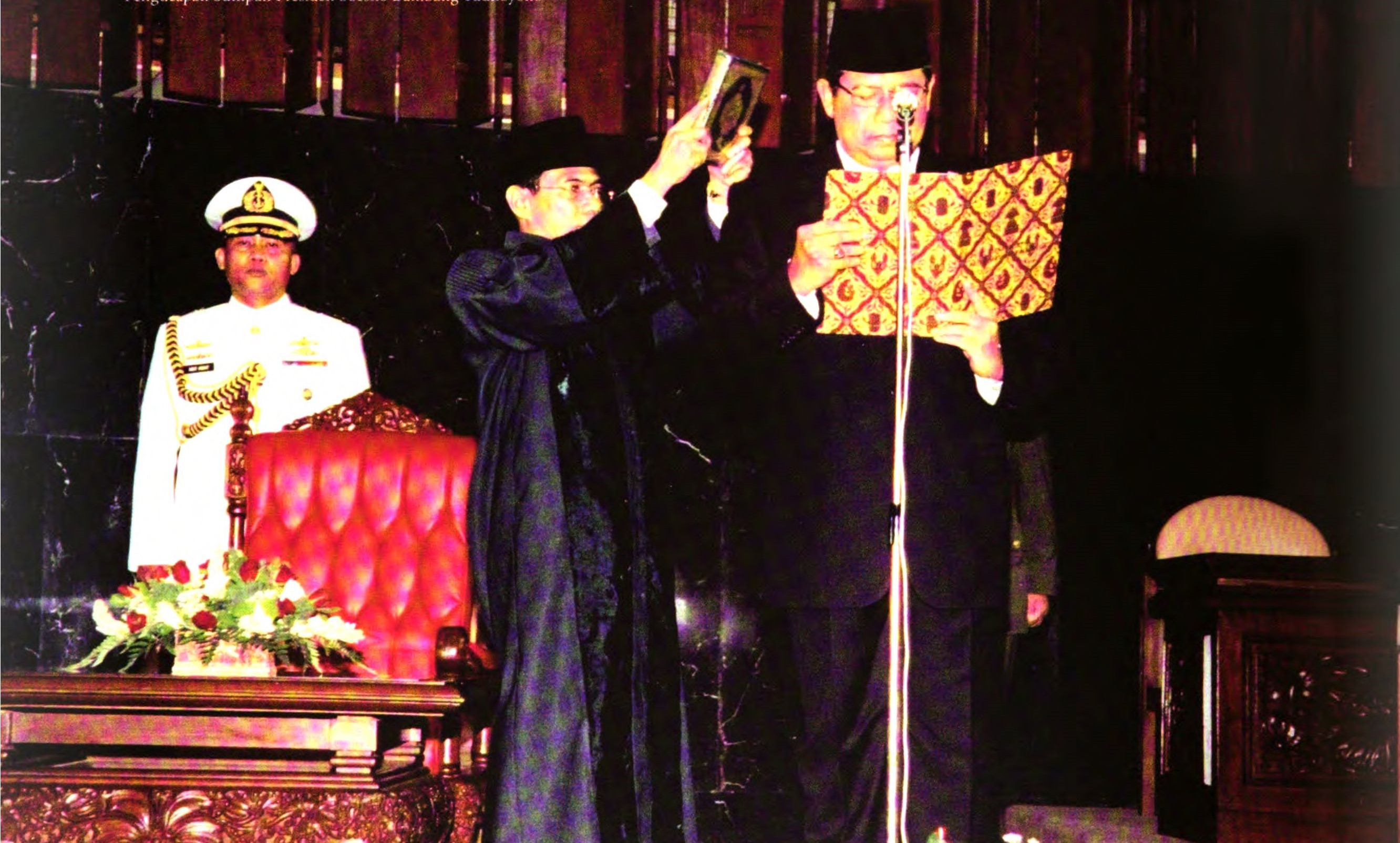
- President Susilo Bambang Yudhoyono taking his presidential oath in 2004
- Date: 20 October 2004; 21 years ago
- Location: Parliamentary Complex, Jakarta
- Organized by: People's Consultative Assembly
- Participants: Susilo Bambang Yudhoyono 6th president of Indonesia; Jusuf Kalla 10th vice president of Indonesia; — Assuming office

The first inauguration of Susilo Bambang Yudhoyono (better known by his initials as SBY) as the 6th president of Indonesia took place on Wednesday, 20 October 2004. Yudhoyono was the first democratically and directly elected president of Indonesia, as the previous presidents were elected by the People's Consultative Assembly.

Yudhoyono took his oath in the Parliamentary Complex in Jakarta. This ceremony marked the commencement of the first five-year term of Susilo Bambang Yudhoyono as president and first non-consecutive term of Jusuf Kalla as vice president. Both were sworn in after winning the second round of the presidential election on 20 September 2004.

== Background ==
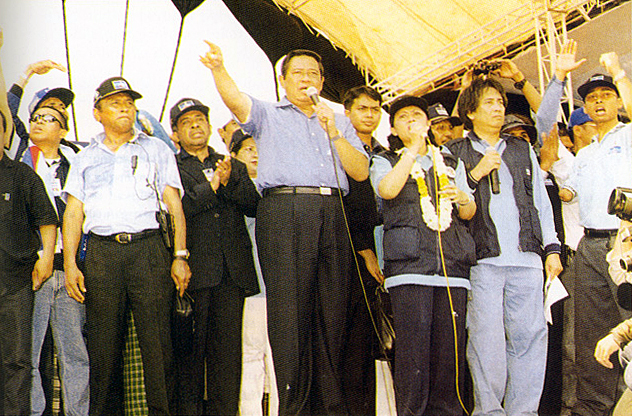
The rapid rise in Susilo Bambang Yudhoyono's (center) popularity helped the Democratic Party garner 7.45% of votes during the April 2004 legislative election.

Susilo Bambang Yudhoyono was nominated for vice president after the MPR selected Megawati to succeed Abdurrahman Wahid by F-KKI, but he lost the election to PPP Chairman Hamzah Haz and DPR Speaker Akbar Tanjung. He reprised his prior cabinet position in Megawati's administration but resigned on 1 March 2004 to join the race for the presidency. The Democratic Party, established as a vehicle for Yudhoyono's political career by secular nationalists who saw the potential of his leadership, received 7.45% of votes and 10% of DPR seats in the April legislative election.

Yudhoyono's running mate was Jusuf Kalla, a Buginese businessman and member of Golkar who served as coordinating minister for people's welfare under Megawati. Kalla joined Golkar's selection process for the party's presidential nominee in August 2003 but withdrew his candidacy days before the party convention the following April. Several days later, he resigned his cabinet position and announced his alliance with Yudhoyono.

=== Second round of the election ===
Yudhoyono-Kalla gained 33.57% votes in the first round of the election. However, the requirements for winning the election is to gain at least 50% of the votes, this made Yudhoyono and Kalla must participate in the second round. On 20 September 2004, Yudhoyono-Kalla won 69,266,350 votes or 60.62% in the second round of the election beating Megawati-Hasyim. Yudhoyono and Kalla was Inaugurated on 20 October 2004.

== Inaugural event ==
The People's Consultative Assembly (MPR) session with the agenda for the Inauguration of the elected President and Vice President for the 2004-2009 period was held at 10:20 Western Indonesia Time (UTC +7). The session was chaired by the Chairperson of the MPR, Hidayat Nur Wahid. Susilo Bambang Yudhoyono and Jusuf Kalla were sworn in at the DPR/MPR Building, on October 20, 2004. Yudhoyono and Kalla read out his oath of office in front of 611 out of 678 MPR RI members who were present. President Megawati Sukarnoputri and Vice-president Hamzah Haz did not attend the inaugural event.

=== Foreign guests ===
It was the first time that foreign leaders had witnessed the swearing in of a new Indonesian president and vice-president. This is the list of foreign leaders who attended Yudhoyono's inauguration:

- (Singapore) Lee Hsien Loong
- (Malaysia) Abdullah Badawi
- (Australia) John Howard
- (Brunei) Sultan Hassanal Bolkiah
- (Timor-Leste) Mari Alkatiri
