= MPR/DPR/DPD building =

Seat of People's Consultative Assembly

Parliamentary Complex of Indonesia
- Kompleks Parlemen Republik Indonesia
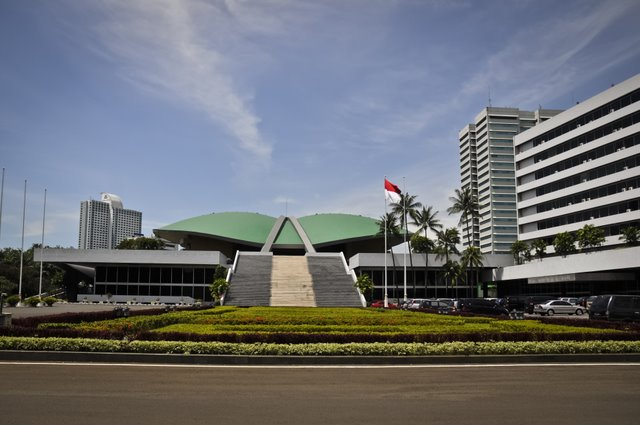
- The main building, Nusantara

- Location within Jakarta

General information
- Location: Central Jakarta, Jakarta, Indonesia
- Coordinates: 6°12′37″S 106°48′00″E
- Construction started: 8 March 1965
- Construction stopped: 1968
- Completed: 1 February 1983; 43 years ago (Main building completed in March 1968)

Height
- Height: 100 metres (330 ft)

Technical details
- Size: 80,000 square metres (860,000 sq ft)

Design and construction
- Architect: Soejoedi Wirjoatmodjo
- Main contractor: Hutama Karya

Other information
- Public transit: Palmerah; Petamburan and Gerbang Pemuda

The Parliamentary Complex of Indonesia (Indonesian: Kompleks Parlemen Republik Indonesia), also known as the MPR/DPR/DPD Building, is the seat of government for the Indonesian legislative branch of government, which consists of the People's Consultative Assembly (MPR), the House of Representatives (DPR) and the Regional Representative Council (DPD).

== History ==
=== Construction ===
==== Sukarno administration ====
Construction of the building was ordered on March 8, 1965, by Sukarno, the first president of Indonesia, through the Presidential Decree of the Republic of Indonesia Number 48 of 1965. The building was intended to house the Conference of the New Emerging Forces (CONEFO), a now defunct alternative for the United Nations, with the first conference being scheduled to be held in 1966. The members of the organization were planned to consist of the countries of Asia, Africa, Latin America, and the Non-Aligned Movement.

The first conference was scheduled to be held in 1966, and the building was scheduled for completion before August 17, 1966 — leaving 17 months left for the construction to take place. Construction began in March 1965 following a contest for the design, which resulted in the design by architect Soejoedi Wirjoatmodjo being agreed upon and ratified by President Sukarno on February 22, 1965.

==== Suharto administration ====
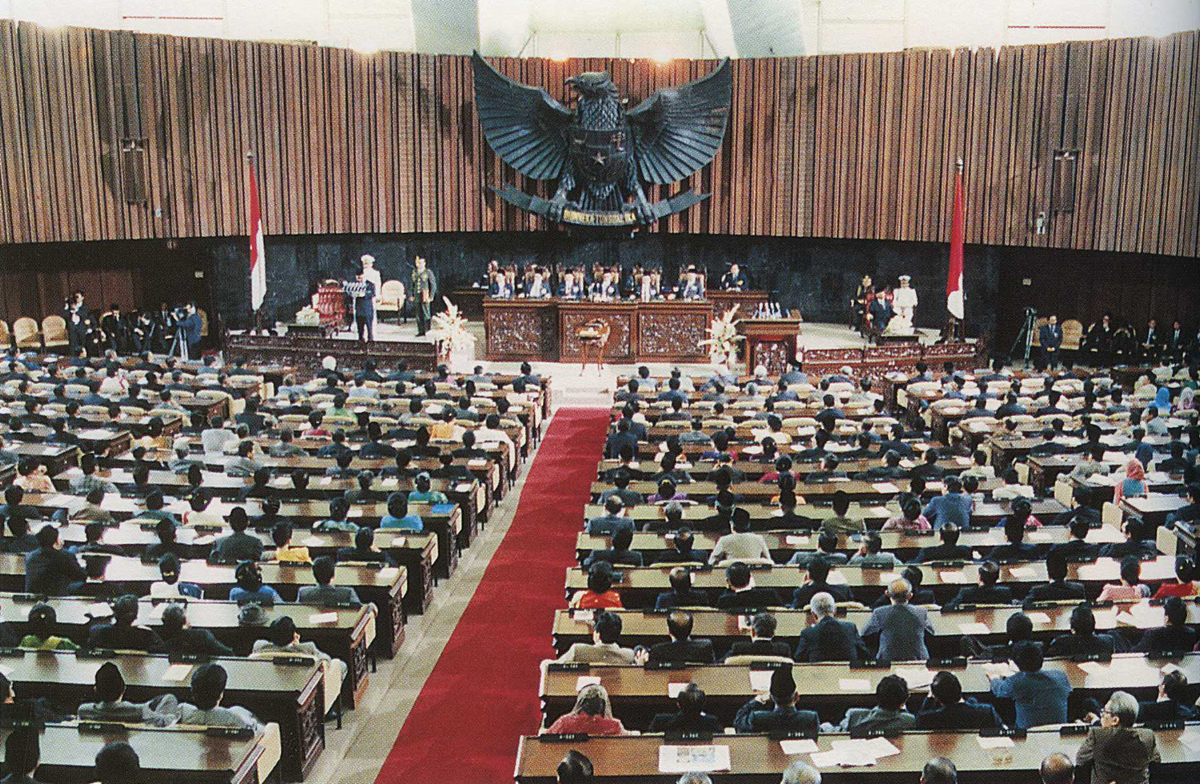
Suharto delivering his inauguration speech for the sixth time as president, 1993.

Construction was hampered due to the coup attempt on September 30, 1965. The CONEFO idea was soon abandoned after Sukarno's fall, but the building's construction was resumed based on the Decree of the Presidium of the Ampera Cabinet Number 79/U/Kep/11/1966 dated November 9, 1966, whose designation was changed for the MPR/DPR RI Building.

Gradually, construction was completed and handed over to the Secretariat General of the DPR: Main Conference Building (March 1968), Secretariat Building and Health Center Building (March 1978), Auditorium Building (September 1982), and Banquet Building (February 1983).

=== May 1998 ===
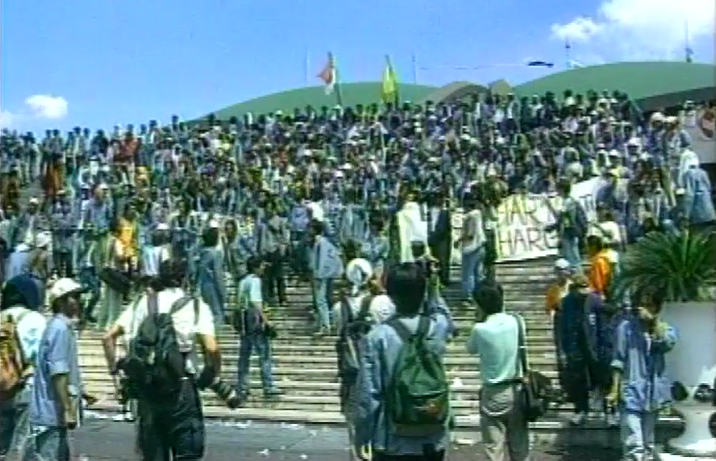
Students occupy the buildings during May 1998 riots.

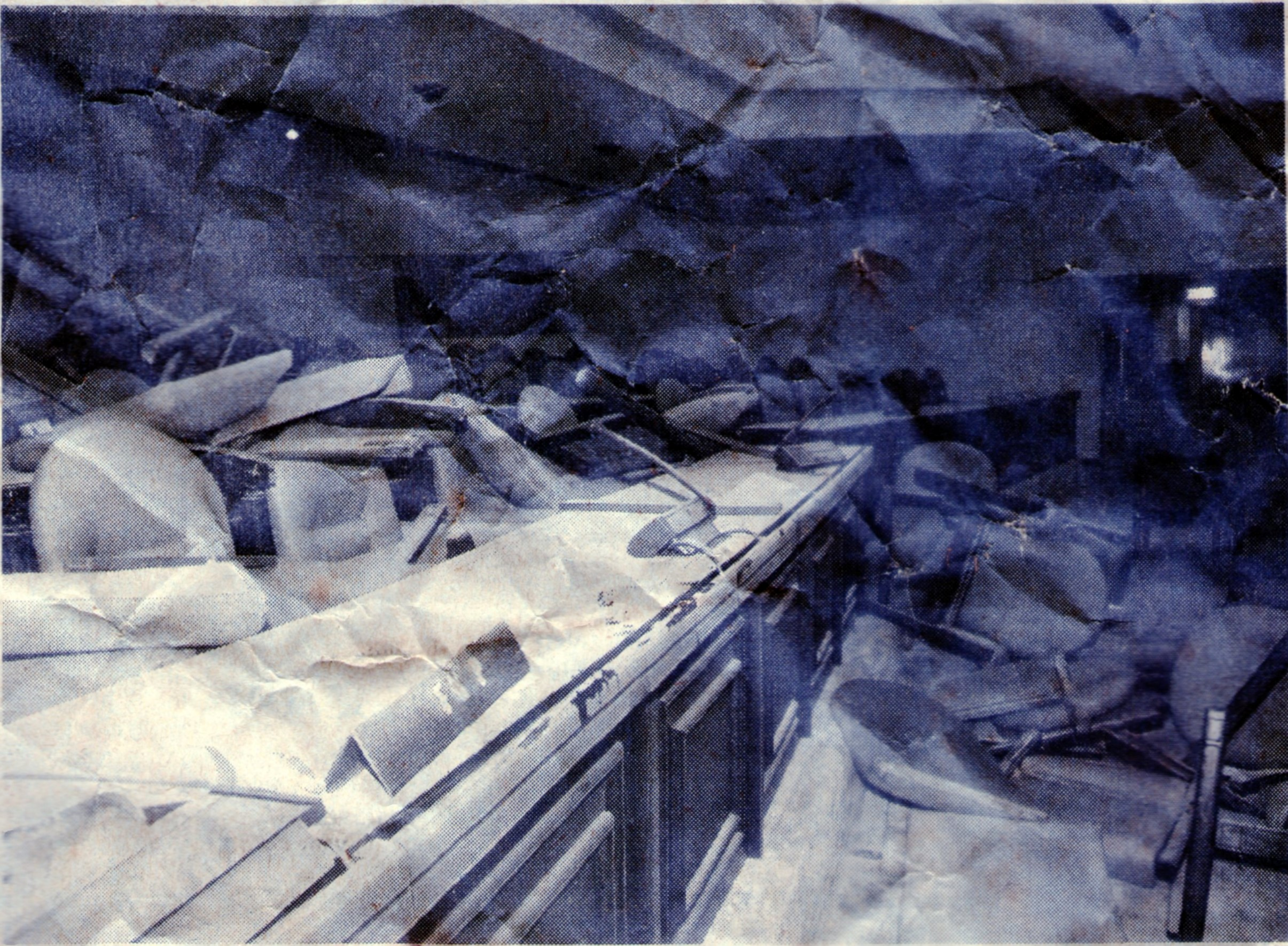
Destroyed meeting room after being occupied by students.

In May 1998, the buildings were occupied by about 80,000 tertiary students protesting against the Trisakti shootings and the continuation of Suharto's New Order regime, which also calling for the dissolution of the People's Representative Council and People's Consultative Assembly of the 1998–2003 period.

== Buildings ==
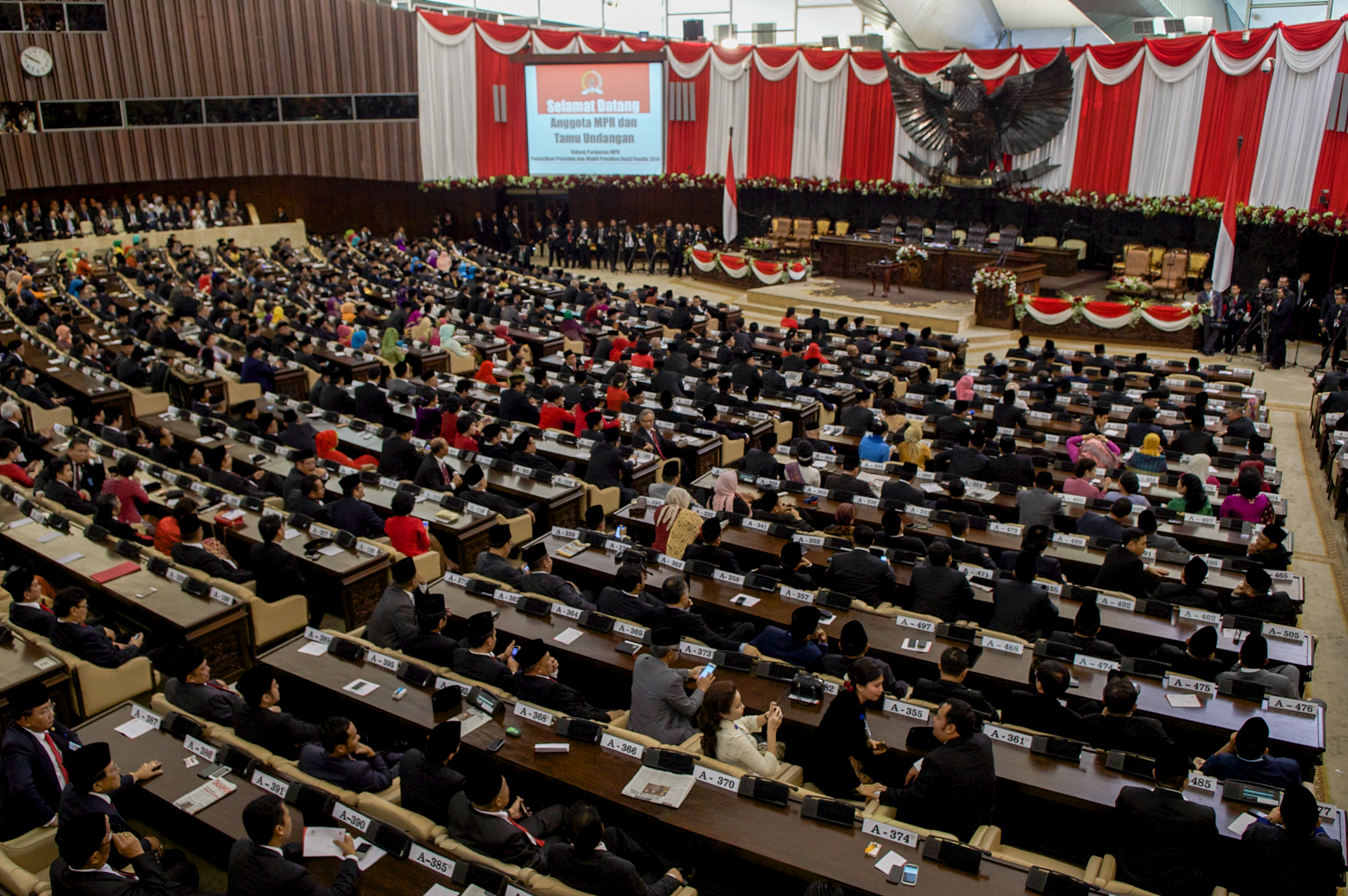
Meeting hall inside the main building, Nusantara.

The complex comprises six buildings. The main building is Nusantara with its unique Garuda wing-shaped roof and contains the 1,700-seat plenary meeting hall. The other five buildings are Nusantara I, a 23-storey building containing parliament members' offices and meeting rooms; Nusantara II and Nusantara III, which contain committee meeting rooms and offices; Nusantara IV, used for conferences and ceremonies; and Nusantara V, which has a 500-seat plenary hall.

== Gallery ==
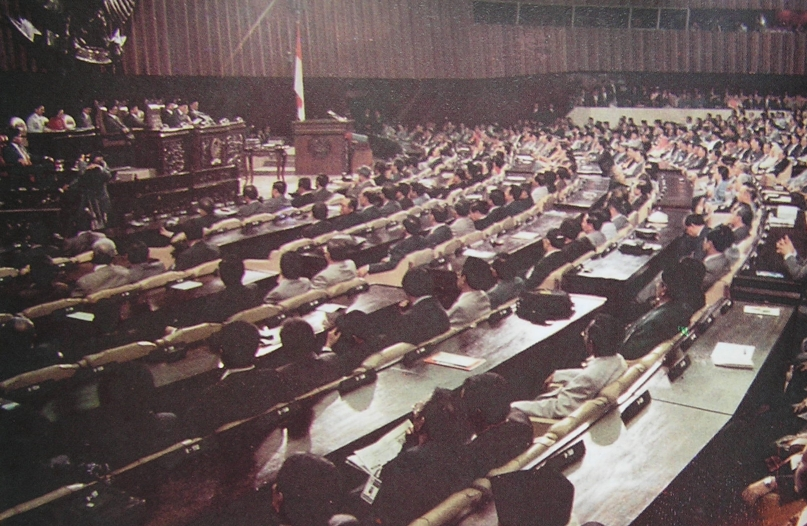
A People's Consultative Assembly session in 1999 inside Nusantara

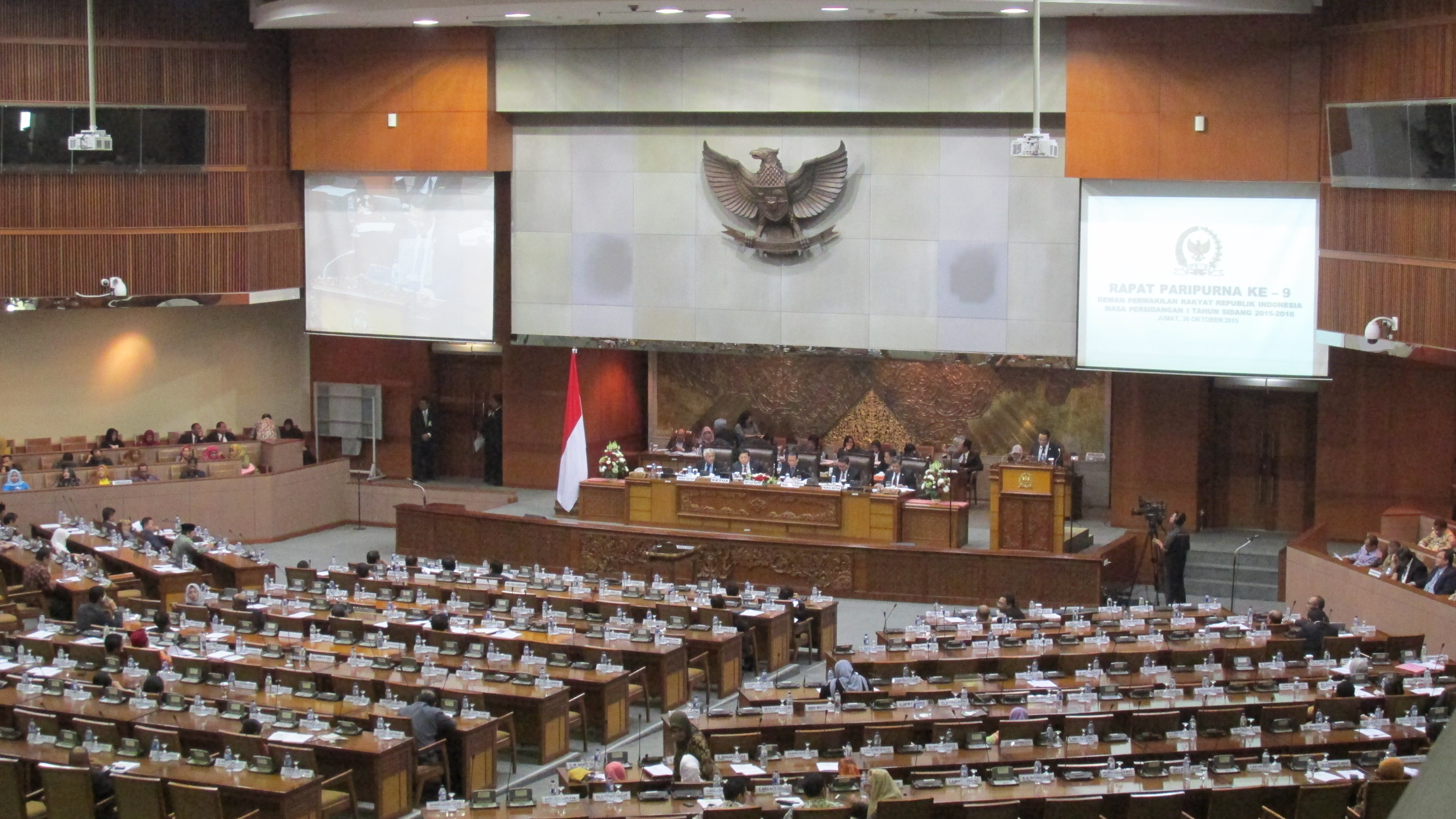
People's Representative Council meeting hall inside Nusantara II

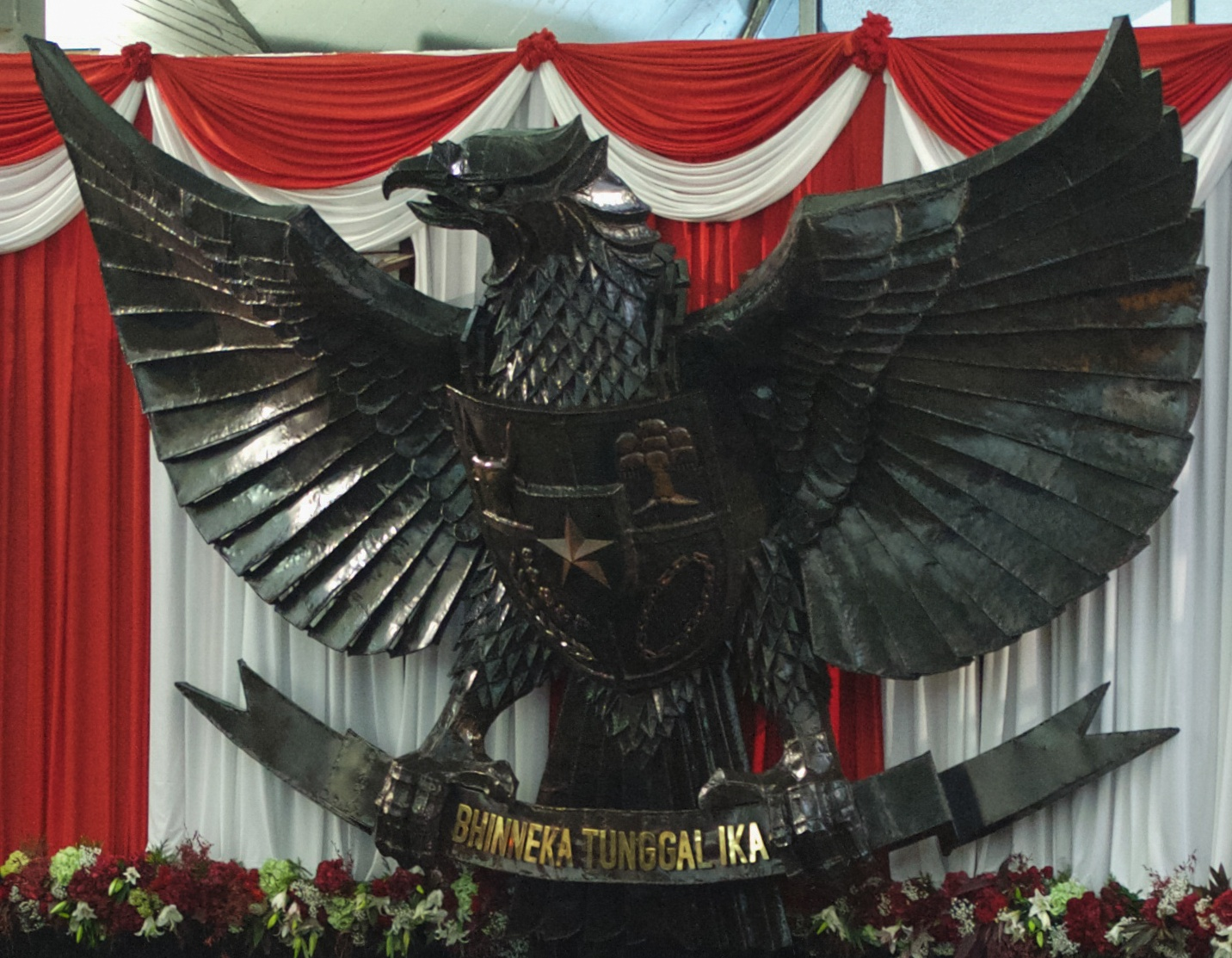
Detail of the national emblem displayed in front of Nusantara's meeting hall

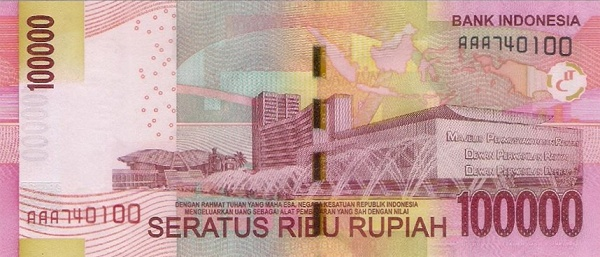
Featured on the reverse side of the 2014 issued 100,000 rupiah note

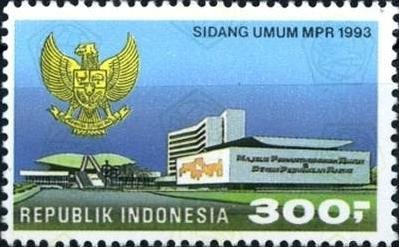
Featured in a 1993 stamp

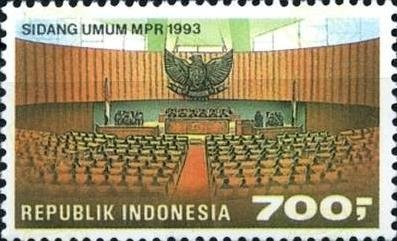
Featured in a 1993 stamp

=== Presidential inauguration ===
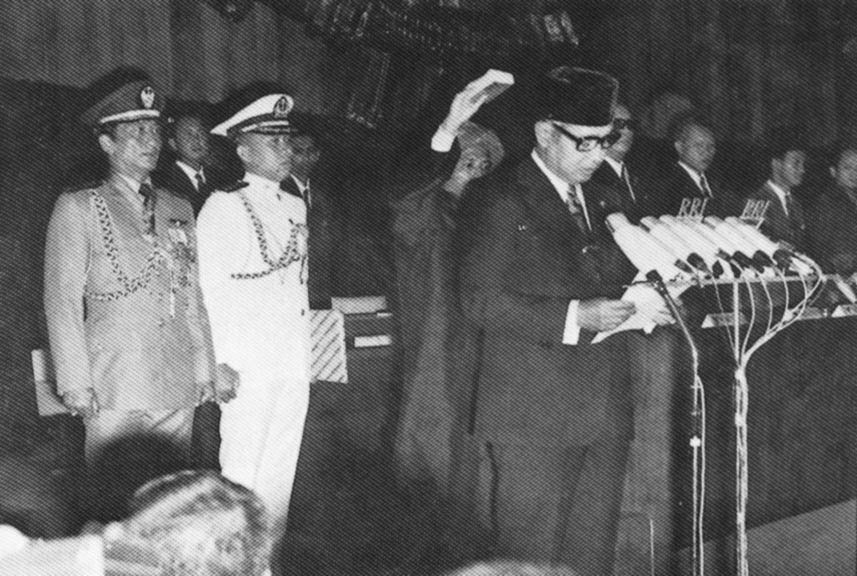
First inauguration of Suharto, 1968

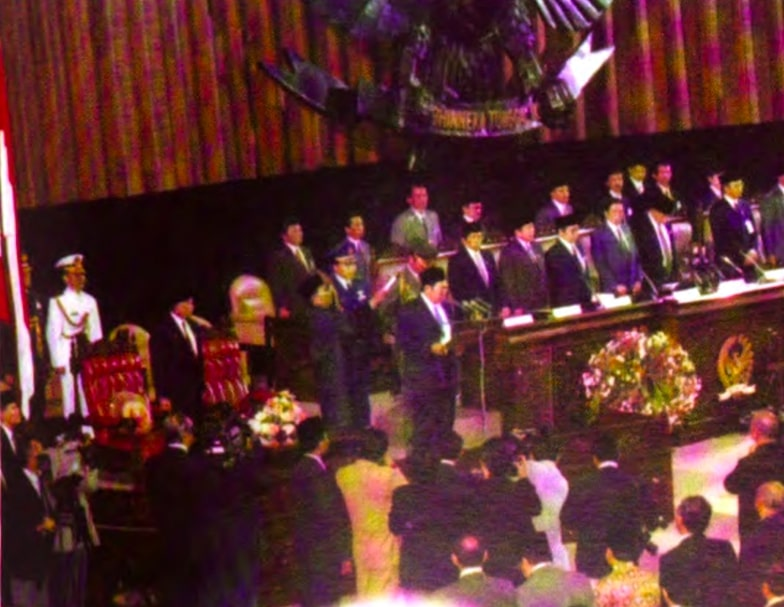
Inauguration of Abdurrahman Wahid, 1999

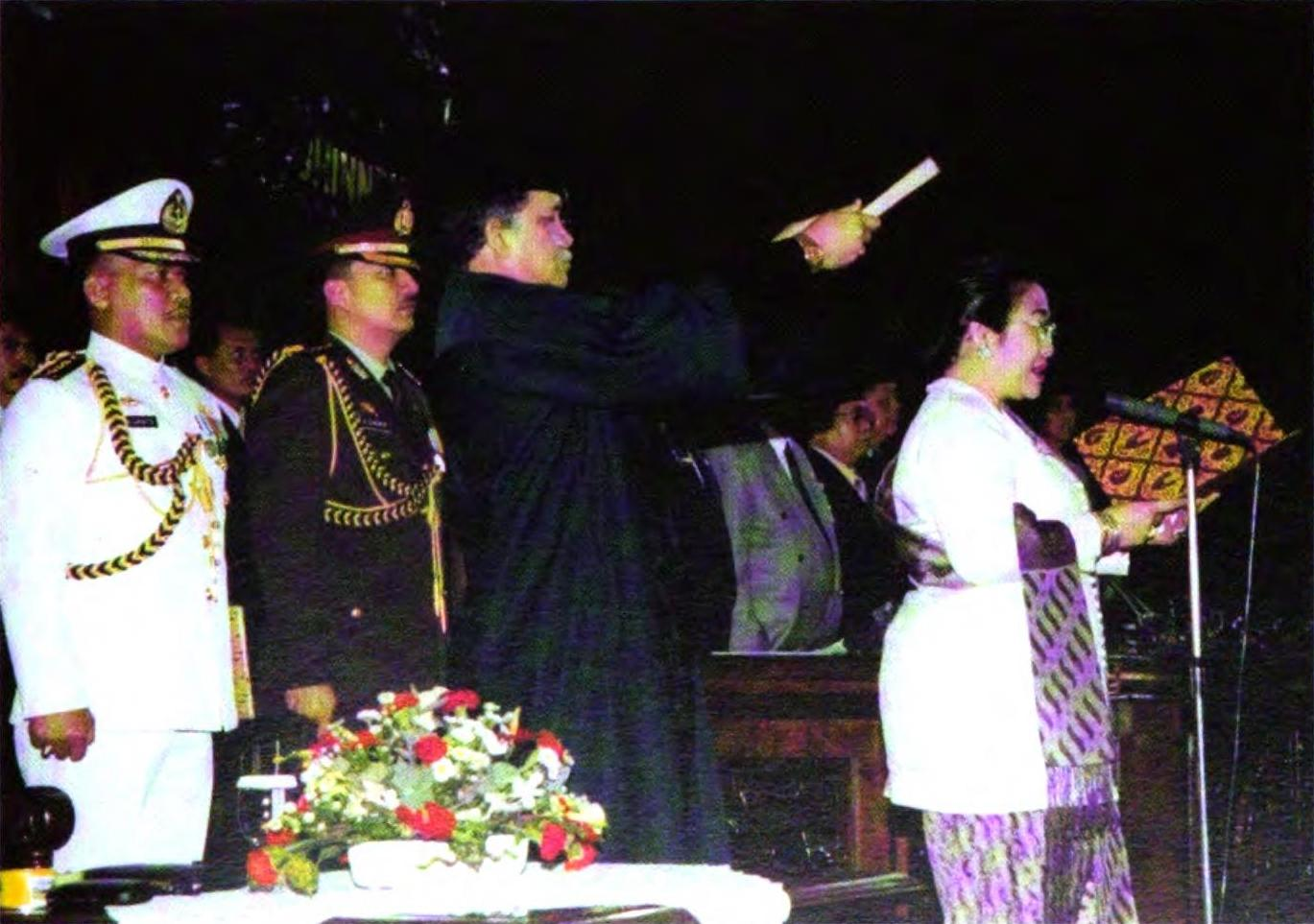
Inauguration of Megawati Sukarnoputri, 2001

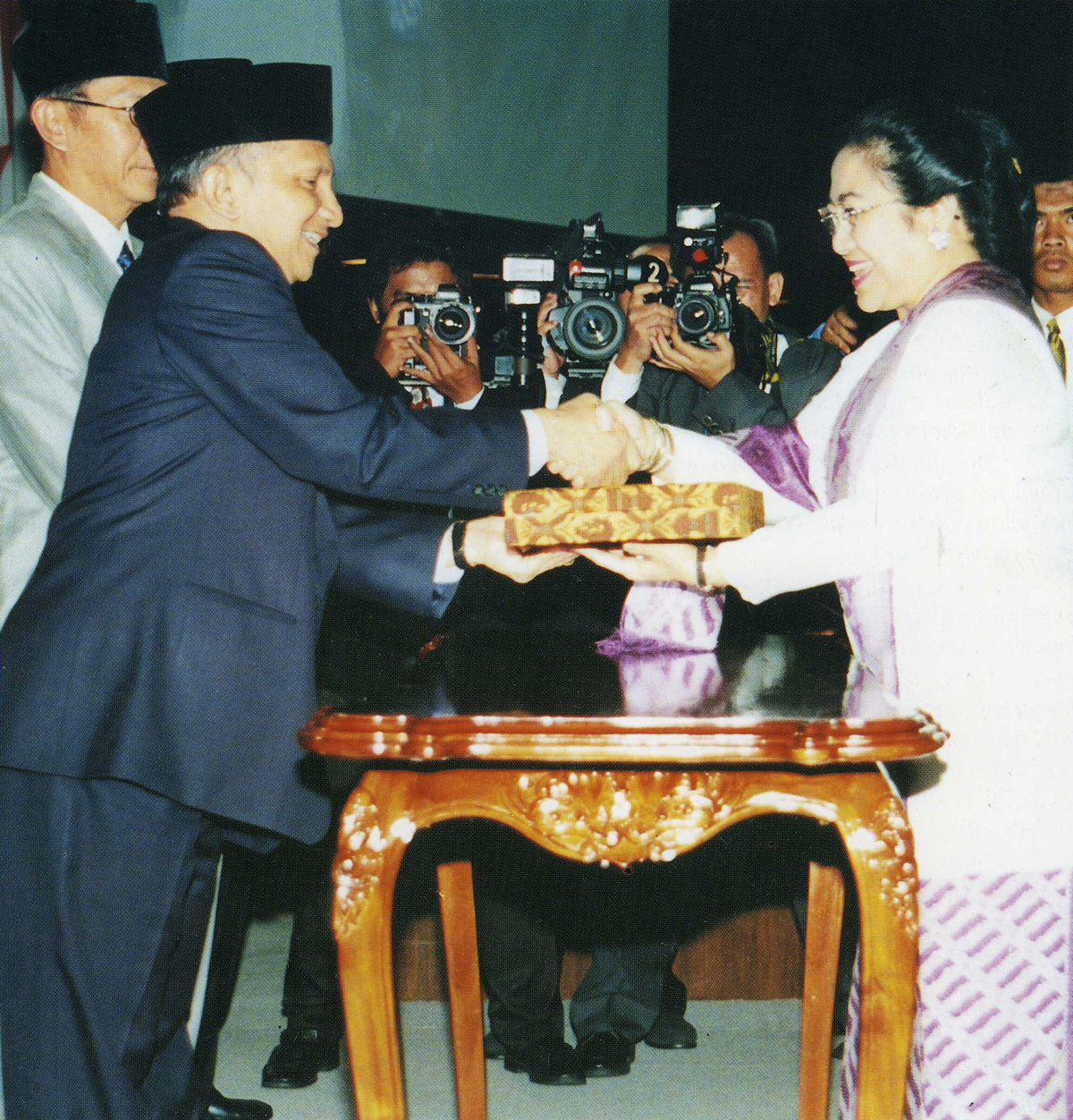
Megawati after Wahid's impeachment and her inauguration, 2001

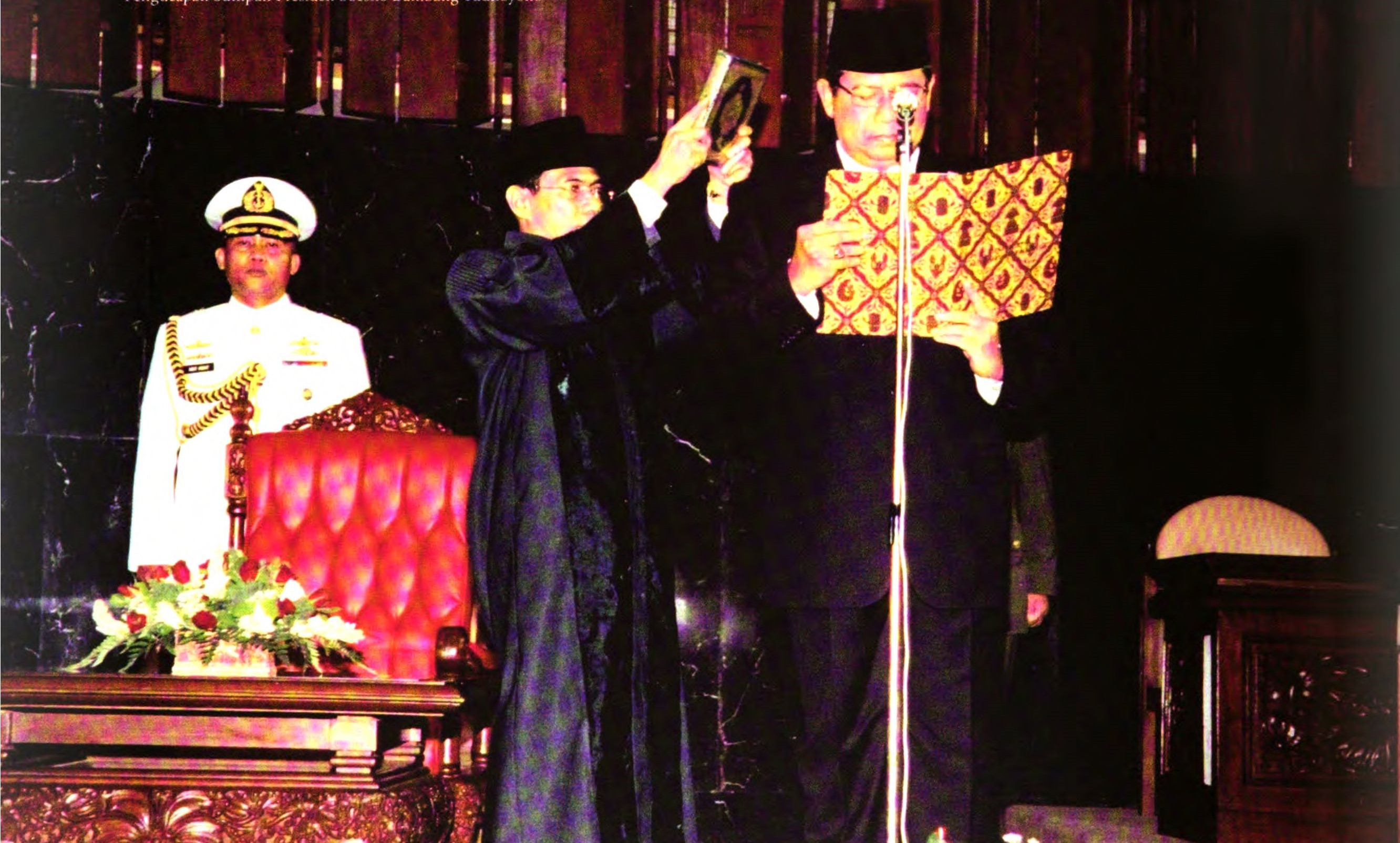
First inauguration of Susilo Bambang Yudhoyono, 2004

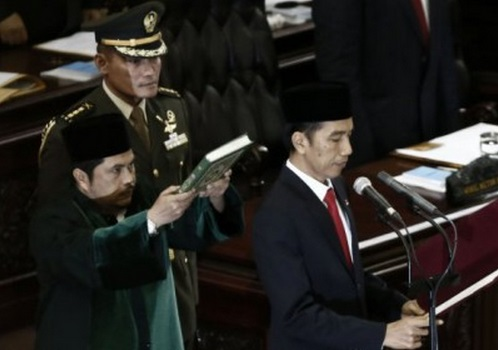
First inauguration of Joko Widodo, 2014

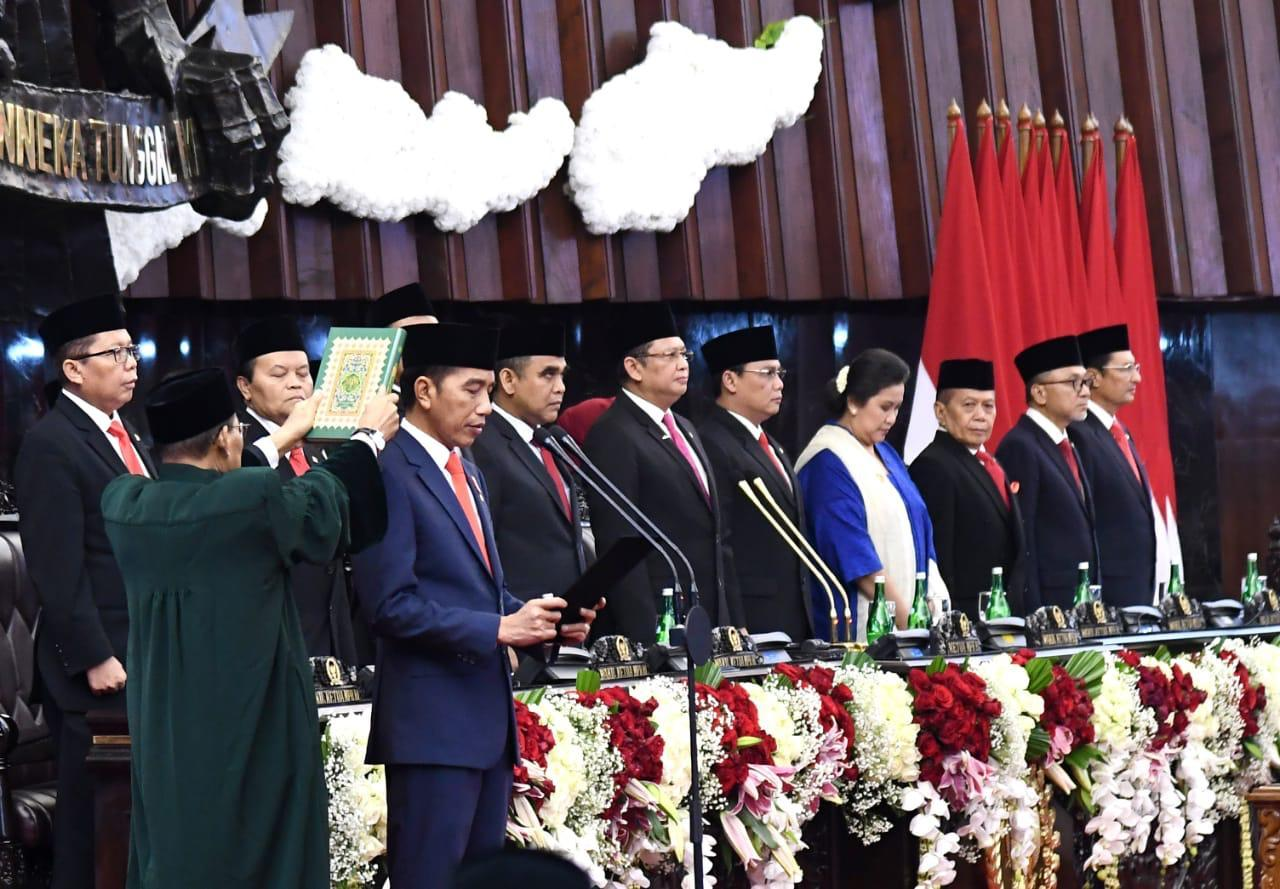
Second inauguration of Joko Widodo, 2019

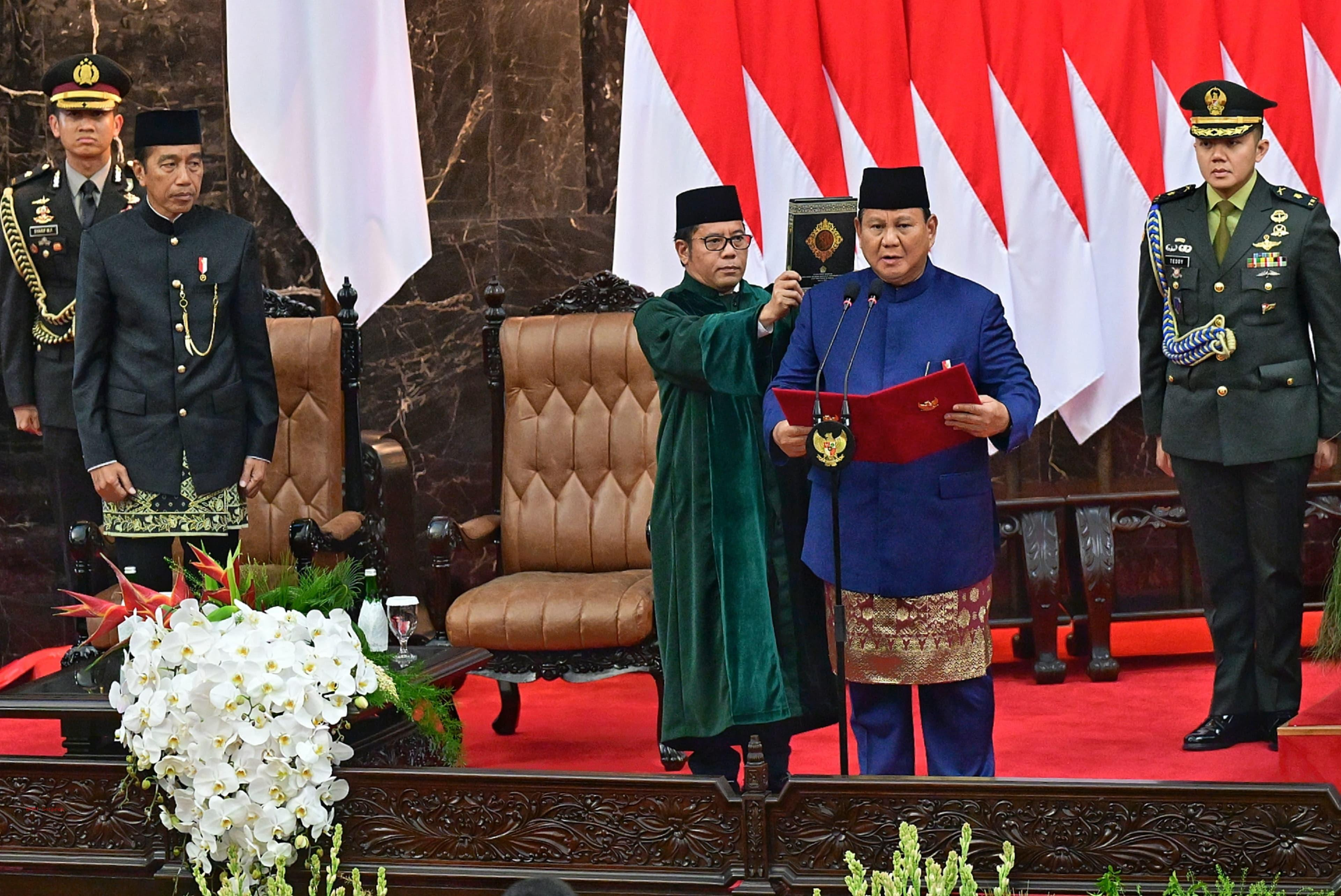
Inauguration of Prabowo Subianto, 2024
