= First inauguration of Joko Widodo =

2014 inauguration of Indonesian president

First presidential inauguration of Joko Widodo
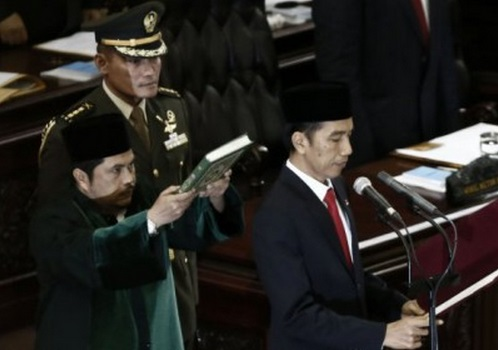
- President Joko Widodo taking his presidential oath of office in 2014
- Date: 20 October 2014; 11 years ago
- Location: Parliamentary Complex, Jakarta
- Organized by: People's Consultative Assembly
- Participants: Joko Widodo 7th president of Indonesia; Jusuf Kalla 12th vice president of Indonesia; — Assuming office: Susilo Bambang Yudhoyono 6th president of Indonesia; Boediono 11th vice president of Indonesia; — Leaving office

The first inauguration of Joko Widodo as the 7th president of Indonesia took place on Monday, 20 October 2014 at the Parliamentary Complex, Jakarta. This ceremony marked the commencement of the first five-year term of Joko Widodo (universally known as Jokowi) as president and second non-consecutive and final term of Jusuf Kalla as vice president.

Jokowi and Kalla won the 2014 election with 53.15% of the popular vote against their only rivals, Prabowo Subianto and Hatta Rajasa.

== Context ==
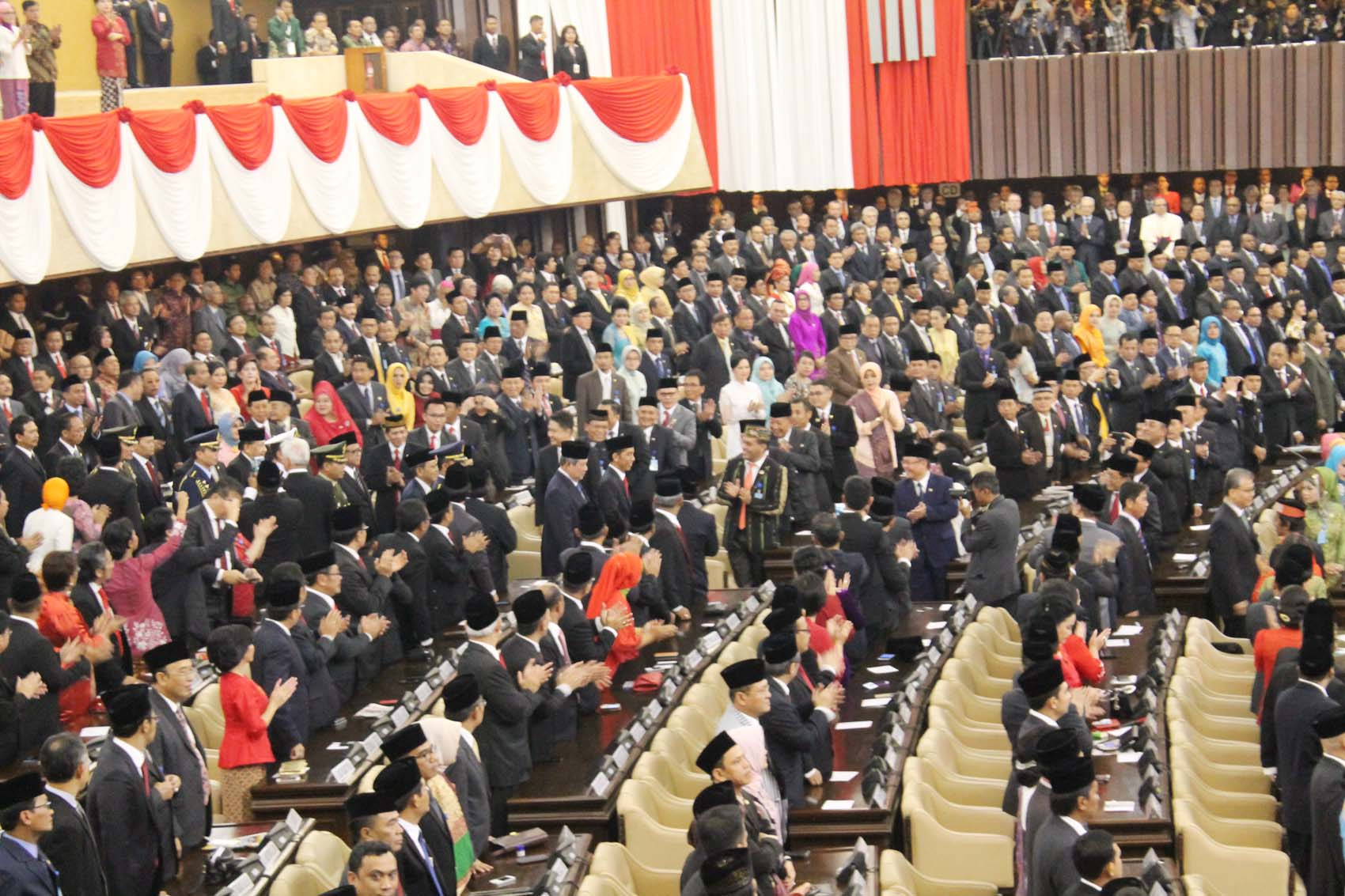
DPR in Session. Welcoming SBY and Jokowi. During Jokowi's inauguration in 2014

Joko Widodo was elected in the highly competitive 2014 election. Jokowi, who held the post of mayor of Surakarta and the governor of Jakarta receives widespread national and international media attention due to his unique background and style. He is the son of a carpenter who worked as a furniture exporter before becoming a politician. He is the first Indonesian president not to have come from the military or political elite. His unique leadership style, including blusukan (spending time in impoverished areas to informally chat with the people), proved very popular among Indonesians.

Five days before his inauguration, Time magazine featured him on the cover page, titled "A New Hope."

== Inauguration ceremony ==
The inauguration ceremony was started on 10:00 local time (03:00 UTC). It was held on the People's Consultative Assembly parliamentary session led by assembly speaker Zulkifli Hasan. Before the reading of the oath, he read the proclamation on the election results. President-elect Joko Widodo then read the presidential oath, followed by Jusuf Kalla afterwards.

After his inauguration, Joko Widodo delivered his inaugural address, titled Di Bawah Kehendak Rakyat dan Konstitusi (Under the Will of the People and the Constitution). In his speech, he promised that his government would ensure every citizen throughout the archipelago, including its furthest reaches, would be served. He also calls for unity among Indonesians and announcing his determination to establish Indonesia as a maritime country. To foreign guests and delegates, he said that Indonesia would remain consistent with its free and active foreign policy.

== Post-ceremony events ==
After the inauguration ceremony, the process continued by a people's festival that took place in the Monas monument, a few kilometres away from the DPR/MPR Building. Joko Widodo and Jusuf Kalla joined the cultural parade started from Hotel Indonesia roundabout to the Istana Merdeka, carried by a chariot. In the Istana, outgoing President Yudhoyono and his cabinet ceremonially handed over the presidential palace with a military procession. He then joined the peoples festival and addressed another speech.

== Guests ==
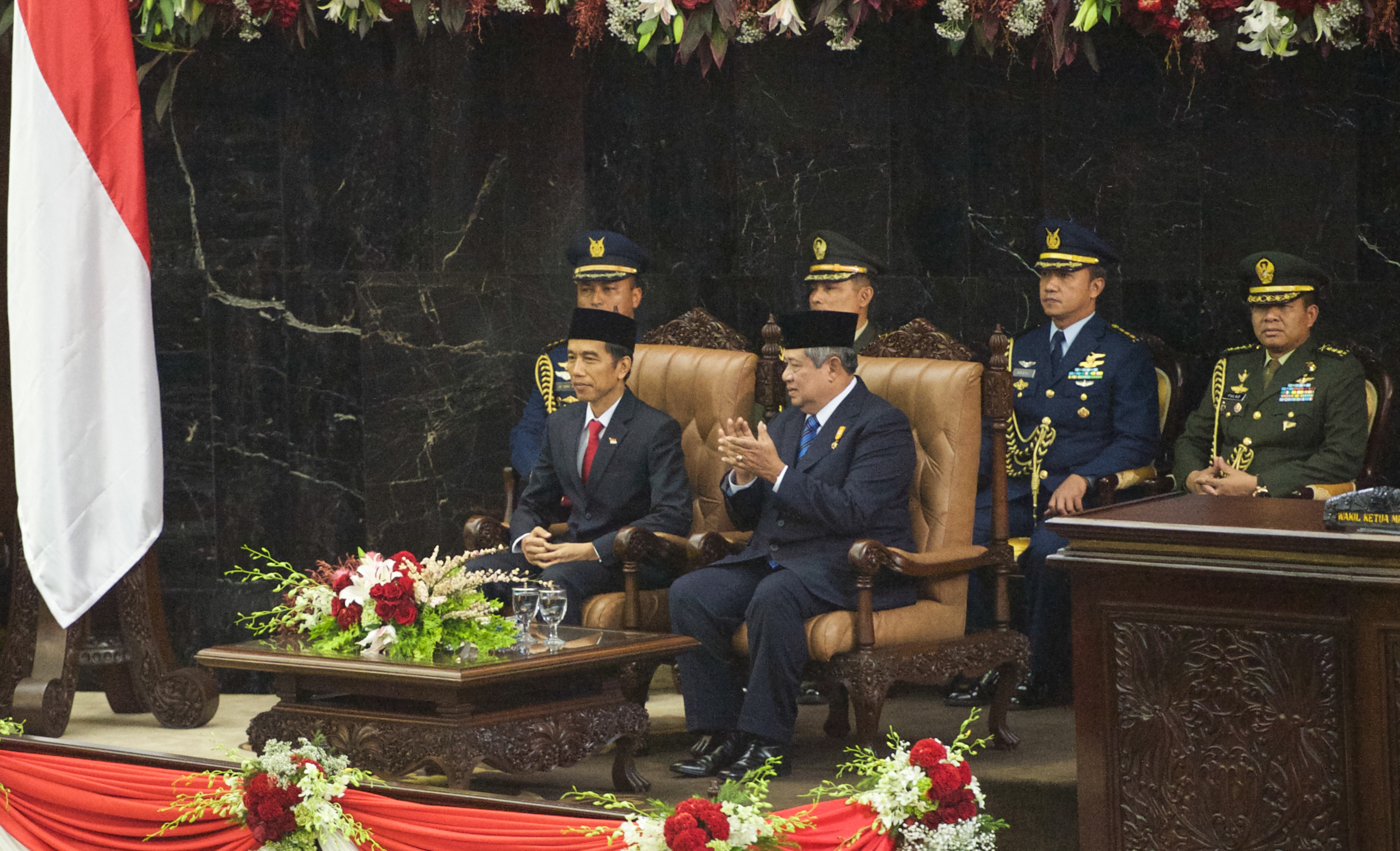
President Joko Widodo switched seats with his predecessor Susilo Bambang Yudhoyono after reciting the oath of office, the first presidential "seat-switching" since 1999 (between B. J. Habibie and Abdurrahman Wahid.)

Local guests attended the ceremony including the former presidents of Indonesia, B. J. Habibie and Megawati Sukarnoputri, and former First Lady Sinta Nuriyah. Former vice presidents Try Sutrisno and Hamzah Haz also attended the inauguration. His rivals during the election, Prabowo Subianto and Hatta Rajasa also attended the ceremony, receiving appreciation and applause.

There were several international guests attended the inauguration ceremony, and until the inauguration ceremony, there are more than 90 diplomats and foreign representatives confirmed their attendance.

=== Foreign attendees ===
- Tony Abbott, Prime Minister of Australia
- Hassanal Bolkiah, Sultan of Brunei
- Andrew Saxton, Member of the House of Commons and Parliamentary Secretary to the Minister of Finance of Canada
- Yan Junqi, vice-chairwoman of the National People's Congress of China
- (Timor-Leste) Taur Matan Ruak, President of East Timor
- Yasuo Fukuda, former Prime Minister of Japan (as Emperor of Japan's Special Envoy)
- Kim Tae-hwan and Ham Jin-gyu, President of South Korea's Special Envoy
- Najib Razak, Prime Minister of Malaysia
- Herman Tjeenk Willink, Minister of State of the Netherlands (as King of the Netherlands' Special Envoy)
- Murray McCully, Foreign Minister of New Zealand
- Peter O'Neill, Prime Minister of Papua New Guinea
- Albert del Rosario, Secretary of Foreign Affairs of the Philippines
- Denis Manturov, Minister of Industry and Trade of Russia
- Lee Hsien Loong, Prime Minister of Singapore
- Anura Priyadharshana Yapa, Minister of Petroleum Industries of Sri Lanka
- Thanasak Patimaprakorn, Deputy Prime Minister and Foreign Minister of Thailand
- Nurettin Canikli, Minister of Customs and Trade of Turkey
- John Kerry, Secretary of State of the United States
- Đào Việt Trung, President of Vietnam's Special Envoy

== See also ==
- 2014 Indonesian presidential election
- Joko Widodo 2014 presidential campaign
- Second inauguration of Joko Widodo
