= Second inauguration of Joko Widodo =

2019 presidential inauguration in Indonesia

Second presidential inauguration of Joko Widodo
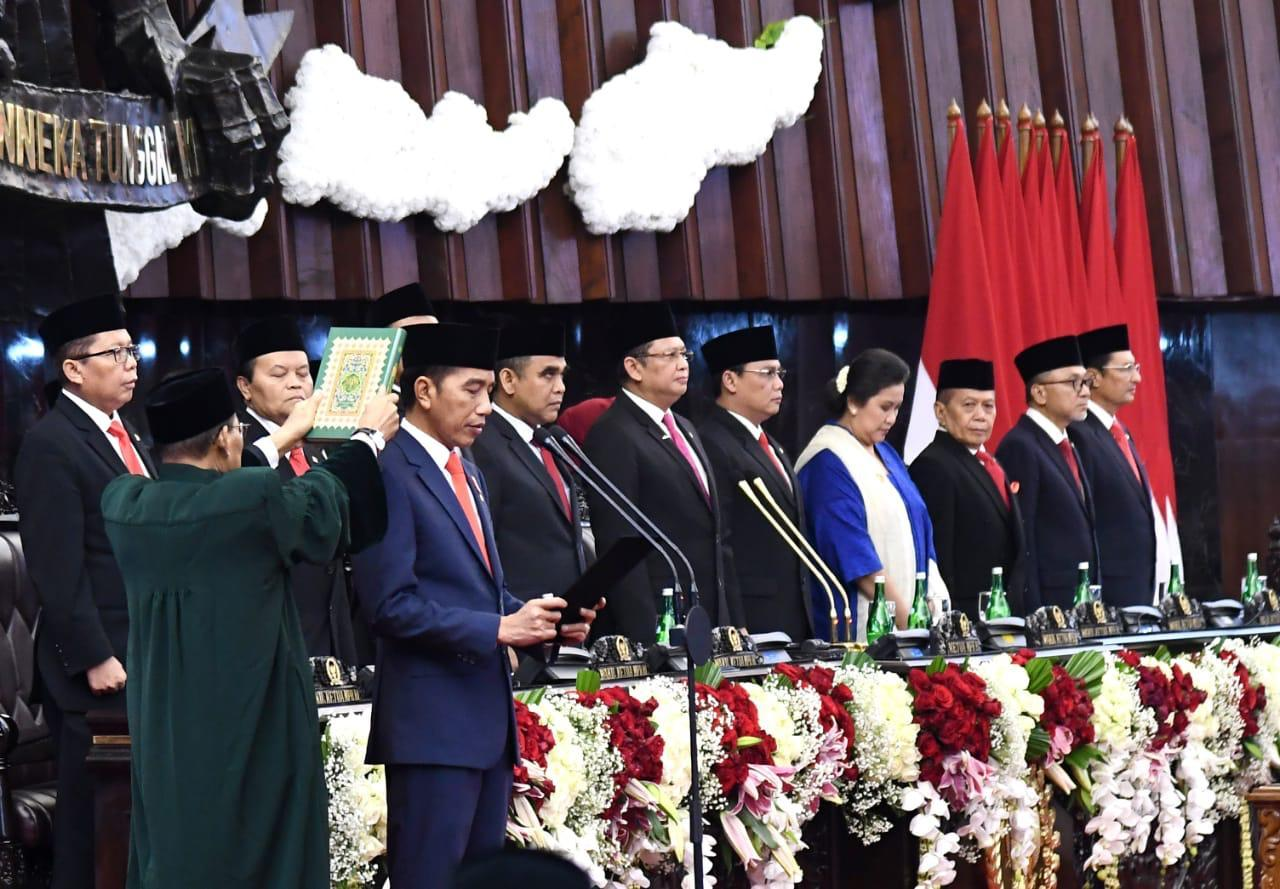
- President Joko Widodo taking his presidential oath of office in 2019
- Date: 20 October 2019; 6 years ago
- Location: Parliamentary Complex, Jakarta
- Organized by: People's Consultative Assembly
- Participants: Joko Widodo 7th president of Indonesia; Ma'ruf Amin 13th vice president of Indonesia; — Assuming office: Jusuf Kalla 12th vice president of Indonesia; — Leaving office

The second inauguration of Joko Widodo as the 7th president of Indonesia took place on Sunday, 20 October 2019 at the Parliamentary Complex, Jakarta. This ceremony marked the commencement of the second consecutive and final five-year term of Joko Widodo (universally known as Jokowi) as president and first term of Ma'ruf Amin as vice president.

Jokowi-Amin ticket won the 2019 election with 55.5% of the popular vote against their only opponent, Prabowo Subianto-Sandiaga Uno. After Prabowo's dispute was rejected by the Constitutional Court, the General Elections Commission (KPU) declared the ticket as winner.

== Inauguration ceremony ==
The inauguration ceremony was started on 15:30 local time (08:30 UTC), 60 minutes later than scheduled. It was held as a People's Consultative Assembly (MPR) parliamentary session and was led by its speaker Bambang Soesatyo. As the inauguration was held in a Sunday, the assembly decided to push forward the session starting time, which usually held at 10:00 local time. The reasons were to give Christians and Buddhists to attend their respective religious service. It was also intended to not interrupt the weekly car free day held near the venue at the morning to noon with road closures; the car free day event was cancelled anyway.

Unlike the previous inauguration, cultural parades were not held. The event's security involved 31,000 personnel from the Indonesian National Police and the Indonesian National Armed Forces.

== Guests ==
=== Indonesians ===
- Iriana, First Lady of Indonesia
- Mufidah Mi'ad Saad, Second Lady of Indonesia
- Wury Estu Handayani, Second Lady-designate of Indonesia
- Megawati Sukarnoputri, 5th president of Indonesia and 8th vice president
- Susilo Bambang Yudhoyono, 6th president of Indonesia
- Hamzah Haz, 9th vice president of Indonesia
- Boediono, 11th vice president of Indonesia
- Hadi Tjahjanto, Commander of the Indonesian National Armed Forces
- Tito Karnavian, Chief of the Indonesian National Police
- Puan Maharani, Speaker of the DPR
- La Nyalla Mattalitti, Speaker of the DPD
- Anwar Usman, Chief Justice of the Constitutional Court of Indonesia
- Akbar Tanjung, 13th speaker of the DPR
- Agung Laksono, 14th speaker of the DPR
- Ginandjar Kartasasmita, 1st Speaker of the DPD
- Irman Gusman, 2nd Speaker of the DPD
- Oesman Sapta Odang, 4th speaker of the DPD
- Anies Baswedan, Governor of Jakarta
- Basuki Tjahaja Purnama, former Governor of Jakarta
- Prabowo Subianto, losing presidential nominee of 2019 presidential election
- Sandiaga Uno, losing vice-presidential nominee of 2019 presidential election

=== Foreign dignitaries ===
==== Royalty leaders and the representatives ====
- Hassanal Bolkiah, Sultan of Brunei
- Mswati III, King of Eswatini
- Norihiro Nakayama, Deputy Minister of Foreign Affairs of Japan (as Emperor of Japan's Special Envoy)

==== Presidents, vice presidents, and the representatives ====
- Henry Van Thio, Second Vice-President of Myanmar
- Noh Young-min, Chief of Staff to the President of South Korea (as President of South Korea's Special Envoy)
- Teodoro Locsin Jr., Secretary of Foreign Affairs of the Philippines (as President of the Philippines' Special Envoy)
- Soewarto Moestadja, Minister of Labour of Suriname (as President of Suriname's Special Envoy)
- Nahyan bin Mubarak Al Nahyan, Minister of State for Tolerance of United Arab Emirates (as President of the United Arab Emirates' Special Envoy).
- Elaine Chao, Secretary of Transportation of the United States (as U.S. president's Special Envoy)
- Đặng Thị Ngọc Thịnh, Vice President of Vietnam

==== Prime ministers and deputy prime ministers ====
- Scott Morrison, Prime Minister of Australia
- Hun Sen, Prime Minister of Cambodia
- Saleumxay Kommasith, Foreign Minister of Laos (as President of Laos' Special Envoy)
- Mahathir Mohamad, Prime Minister of Malaysia
- Lee Hsien Loong, Prime Minister of Singapore
- Wissanu Krea-ngam, Deputy Prime Minister of Thailand

Morrison's appearance was the fourth consecutive by an Australian prime minister in an Indonesian presidential inauguration, which dates back to 2004, the year of Indonesia's first popularly-elected presidential election.

== See also ==
- 2019 Indonesian presidential election
- Joko Widodo 2019 presidential campaign
- First inauguration of Joko Widodo
