= Onward Indonesia Coalition =

Political coalition in Indonesia (2018–2024)

Onward Indonesia Coalition Koalisi Indonesia Maju
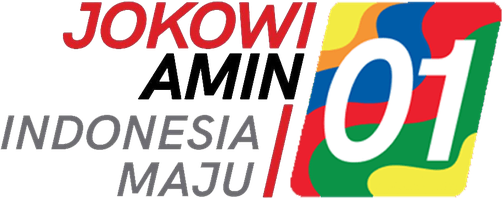
- Abbreviation: KIM
- President: Joko Widodo
- Vice President: Ma'ruf Amin
- Founded: 10 August 2018; 7 years ago
- Dissolved: 20 October 2024; 19 months ago
- Preceded by: Great Indonesia Coalition; Red-White Coalition
- Succeeded by: United Indonesia Coalition; Advanced Indonesia Coalition; Coalition of Change for Unity; Alliance of Parties
- Headquarters: Menteng, Jakarta, Indonesia
- Ideology: Pancasila; Jokowism
- Political position: Big tent
- Member parties: PDI-P; Gerindra (Note: since October 23, 2019); Golkar; NasDem; PKB; Democratic (Note: since February 21, 2024); PAN (Note: since August 31, 2021); PPP; Perindo; Berkarya (Note: since July 12, 2020); PSI; Hanura; PBB; PKP
- Colours: Red White (National colours)
- Slogan: Indonesia Maju (Onward Indonesia)
- DPR RI: 525 / 575
- DPRD I: 1,976 / 2,232
- DPRD II: 15,760 / 17,340
- Politics of Indonesia; Political parties; Elections; A: The act on Political Parties requires that ideologies of political parties "must not conflict with Pancasila or the 1945 Constitution"; thus all parties have Pancasila as one of their ideologies.

The Onward Indonesia Coalition (Indonesian: Koalisi Indonesia Maju, abbrev: KIM ), formerly the Working Indonesia Coalition (Indonesian: Koalisi Indonesia Kerja, KIK), was an official political coalition in Indonesia that supported the presidential/vice presidential candidates Joko Widodo and Ma'ruf Amin in the 2019 presidential election. It was initially known as the Working Indonesia Coalition, founded in 2018. The coalition was later utilized as the government of President Joko Widodo from 2019 to 2024. It was dissolved on 20 October 2024.

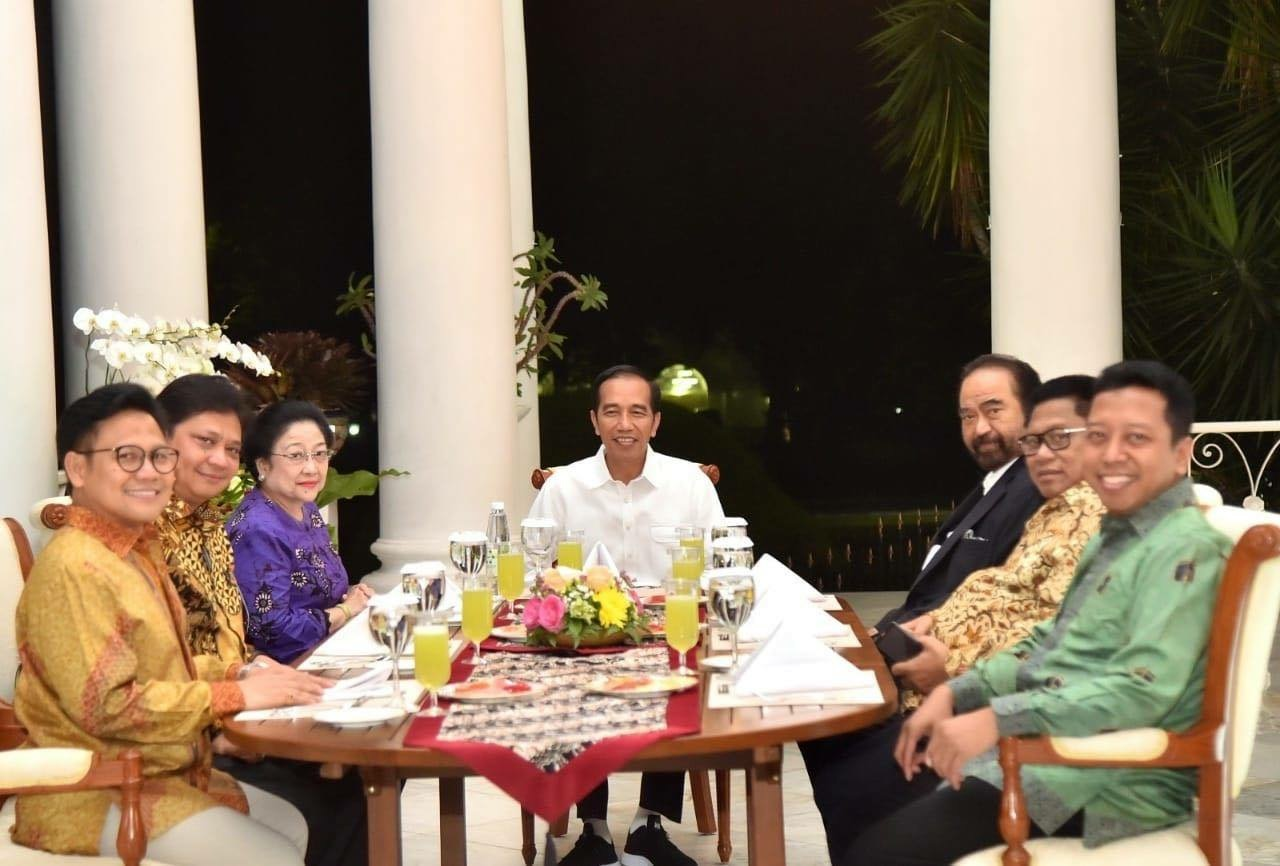
Joko Widodo with the leaders of the Coalition of Cooperation of Government Supporting Parties (KP3) having dinner, July 2018. From left to right: Muhaimin Iskandar, Airlangga Hartarto, Megawati Sukarnoputri, Joko Widodo, Surya Paloh, Oesman Sapta Odang and Muhammad Romahurmuziy.

== History ==
On 10 August 2018, Joko Widodo established the Working Indonesia Coalition (Indonesian: Koalisi Indonesia Kerja) as a competing force against Prabowo Subianto's Just and Prosperous Indonesia Coalition, which consisted of the Great Indonesia Movement Party, the Prosperous Justice Party, the National Mandate Party, the Democratic Party, Berkarya Party and Idaman Party, during the 2019 presidential election. The formation of the coalition was carried out in the declaration at Plataran Restaurant, Menteng, Central Jakarta. This continued the previous coalition, the Great Indonesia Coalition by Megawati Sukarnoputri.

Joko Widodo also formed his team to win himself as a presidential candidate named the National Campaign Team led by Erick Thohir. It was agreed that Ma'ruf Amin would be a candidate for vice president against Sandiaga Uno. Jokowi and Ma'ruf started registering their candidacy on 10 August 2018 together with the leaders of the coalition political parties. Jokowi wore a shirt that reads Bersih, Merakyat, Kerja Nyata ("Clean, Popular, Real Works") and departed from the Joang '45 Building to the General Elections Commission Building.

On 21 October 2019, Joko Widodo offered Gerindra to join his coalition. Then, he entered the names Prabowo Subianto and Edhy Prabowo as ministers in his cabinet. Gerindra Party officially joined the coalition on 23 October 2019. This was a disappointment for the people who had supported Prabowo as a presidential candidate. The National Mandate Party followed Gerindra to join the coalition on 25 August 2021.

== Member parties ==
| Name | | Ideology | Position | Leader(s) | 2019 result | |
| Name | | Ideology | Position | Leader(s) | Votes (%) | Seats |
National party / members of DPR
| PDI-P | Indonesian Democratic Party of Struggle; Partai Demokrasi Indonesia Perjuangan | Marhaenism | Centre-left | Megawati Sukarnoputri | 19.33% | 128 / 575 |
| Gerindra | Great Indonesia Movement Party; Partai Gerakan Indonesia Raya | National conservatism | Right-wing | Prabowo Subianto | 12.57% | 78 / 575 |
| Golkar | Party of the Functional Groups; Partai Golongan Karya | Economic liberalism | Centre-right to right-wing | Bahlil Lahadalia | 12.31% | 85 / 575 |
| NasDem | National Democratic Party; Partai Nasional Demokrat | Social liberalism | Centre to centre-left | Surya Paloh | 9.05% | 59 / 575 |
| PKB | National Awakening Party; Partai Kebangkitan Bangsa | Islamic democracy | Centre | Muhaimin Iskandar | 9.69% | 58 / 575 |
| Demokrat | Democratic Party; Partai Demokrat | Constitutionalism | Centre to centre-right | Agus Harimurti Yudhoyono | 7.77% | 54 / 575 |
| PAN | National Mandate Party; Partai Amanat Nasional | Religious nationalism | Centre to centre-right | Zulkifli Hasan | 6.84% | 44 / 575 |
| PPP | United Development Party; Partai Persatuan Pembangunan | Pan-Islamism | Centre-right to right-wing | Muhammad Mardiono | 4.52% | 19 / 575 |
National party / non-members of DPR
| Perindo | Indonesian Unity Party; Partai Persatuan Indonesia | Conservatism | Centre-right | Hary Tanoesoedibjo | 2.67% | 0 / 575 |
| PSI | Indonesian Solidarity Party; Partai Solidaritas Indonesia | Progressivism | Centre-left to left-wing | Kaesang Pangarep | 1.89% | 0 / 575 |
| Hanura | People's Conscience Party; Partai Hati Nurani Rakyat | Corporatism | Centre | Oesman Sapta Odang | 1.54% | 0 / 575 |
| PBB | Crescent Star Party; Partai Bulan Bintang | Islamic democracy | Right-wing | Yusril Ihza Mahendra | 0.79% | 0 / 575 |
| PKP | Justice and Unity Party; Partai Keadilan dan Persatuan | Secularism | Centre | Yussuf Solichien | 0.22% | 0 / 575 |

== Leadership structure ==
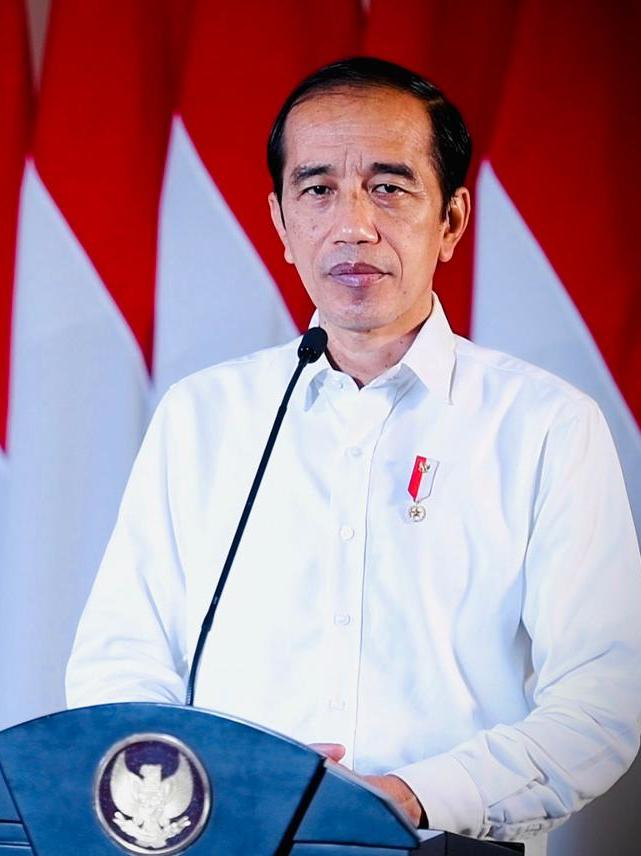
Joko Widodo, the Chairman of the Onward Indonesia Coalition.

- Chairman:
  - Joko Widodo (PDI-P)
- Leadership Council:
  - Megawati Sukarnoputri (PDI-P)
  - Airlangga Hartarto (Golkar)
  - Prabowo Subianto (Gerindra)
  - Surya Paloh (Nasdem)
  - Muhaimin Iskandar (PKB)
  - Zulkifli Hasan (PAN)
  - Suharso Monoarfa (PPP)
  - Hary Tanoesoedibjo (Perindo)
  - Giring Ganesha (PSI)
  - Oesman Sapta Odang (Hanura)
  - Yusril Ihza Mahendra (PBB)
  - Yussuf Solichien (PKP)
- Secretariat Council:
  - Hasto Kristiyanto (PDI-P)
  - Lodewijk Freidrich Paulus (Golkar)
  - Ahmad Muzani (Gerindra)
  - Johnny Gerard Plate (Nasdem)
  - Hasanuddin Wahid (PKB)
  - Eddy Soeparno (PAN)
  - Arwani Thomafi (PPP)
  - Ahmad Rofiq (Perindo)
  - Dea Tunggaesti (PSI)
  - Kodrat Shah (Hanura)
  - Afriansyah Noor (PBB)
  - Syahrul Mamma (PKP)

== General election results ==
| Election | Total seats won | Share of seats | Total votes | Share of votes | Outcome of election |
|---|---|---|---|---|---|
| 2019 | 349 / 575 | 60.69% | 86,801,597 | 62.01% | ▲12 seats (2014 result); Governing coalition |

== Controversies ==
PKB chairman Muhaimin Iskandar proposes postponing the 2024 general election and invites the leaders of coalition political parties with reasons for economic recovery. He said that the general election should be postponed a year or two after the presidential term ends in 2024. This statement was reinforced by the coordinating minister Luhut Binsar Panjaitan who claimed the existence of big data containing 110 million netizens who support the postponement of the election. PAN's Zulkifli Hasan and Golkar's Airlangga Hartarto said the same thing as Muhaimin said. They continued to urge all coalition party leaders to fulfill their wishes even though several political parties, such as PDIP, Gerindra, Nasdem and PPP, refused to postpone the election. Despite refusing to postpone the election, PSI is trying to push for an extension of the presidential term by supporting Jokowi's return as president.

Facing increasingly heated issues, President Joko Widodo stressed to his ministers not to make controversial statements related to postponing elections and extending the presidential term. In the cabinet, the ministers who proposed this were Bahlil Lahadalia, Luhut Binsar Panjaitan and Airlangga Hartarto. The public responded to their statements by holding large-scale demonstrations.
