= Alliance of Political Parties Supporting Ganjar Pranowo =

Political alliance in Indonesia (2023–2024)

Alliance of Political Parties Supporting Ganjar Pranowo Kerja Sama Partai Politik Pengusung Ganjar Pranowo
- Abbreviation: KSP3GP
- Leader: Ganjar Pranowo
- Founded: 30 April 2023; 3 years ago
- Dissolved: 6 May 2024; 2 years ago
- Preceded by: Onward Indonesia Coalition; United Indonesia Coalition
- Ideology: Majority: Pancasila; Indonesian nationalism Sukarnoism; Populism; Marhaenism; Progressivism; Constitutionalism; Anti-New Order revivalism Faction: Anti-Jokowism
- Political position: Big tent
- Member parties: PDI-P; PPP; Perindo; Hanura
- Colours: Black; White
- Slogan: Gerak Cepat, Indonesia Raya, Indonesia Unggul, Indonesia Lebih Baik! (Move Fast, for Greater Indonesia, for Superior Indonesia, for Better Indonesia!)
- DPR RI: 110 / 580
- DPRD I: 545 / 2,372
- DPRD II: 4,495 / 17,510

Website
- ganjarmahfud03.id
- Politics of Indonesia; Political parties; Elections; a: Ganjar Pranowo dissolved the national teams, but he remained as opposition after disbandment. b: The coalition has member parties from the left-wing, centre-left, centre, centre-right, and right-wing.

The Alliance of Political Parties Supporting Ganjar Pranowo (Indonesian: Kerja Sama Partai Politik Pengusung Ganjar Pranowo, KSP3GP), was a collaborative political coalition in Indonesia which was a unified political agreement between two parties from the Onward Indonesia Coalition, namely the Indonesian Democratic Party of Struggle (PDI-P) and the United Development Party (PPP), to nominate and endorse up Ganjar Pranowo's presidential bid in 2024 Indonesian presidential election.

The alliance disbanded on 6 May 2024, after losing the 2024 Indonesian presidential election.

== Timeline ==
21 April 2023 – Megawati Soekarnoputri, Chairwoman of the Indonesian Democratic Party of Struggle (PDI-P) and the winning party in the 2019 Indonesian general election, officially announced that Central Java Governor Ganjar Pranowo would be nominated as the party's presidential candidate for the 2024 Indonesian presidential election.

23 April 2023 – The People's Conscience Party (Hanura) declared its support for PDI-P's decision to back Ganjar.

26 April 2023 – Acting Chairman of the United Development Party (PPP), Muhamad Mardiono, announced the party’s endorsement of Ganjar Pranowo, independently of the United Indonesia Coalition.

30 April 2023 – PDI-P and PPP signed a political cooperation agreement to jointly endorse Ganjar Pranowo.

9 June 2023 – Chairman of the Indonesian Unity Party (Perindo), Hary Tanoesoedibjo, signed a cooperation agreement with PDI-P to support Ganjar's candidacy.

28 August 2023 – Hanura Party Chairman, Oesman Sapta Odang, and PDI-P Chairwoman signed a cooperation agreement to officially endorse Ganjar.

4 September 2023 – The leaders of supporting parties met to form the National Campaign Team (TPN) for Ganjar Pranowo, appointing Arsjad Rasjid (Chairman of the KADIN) as Chair, and General (ret.) Andika Perkasa as one of the deputy chairs. The campaign headquarters was established at the same location used by Jokowi-Ma’ruf’s 2019 campaign, High End Building, Kebon Sirih, Central Jakarta.

5 October 2023 – Arsjad Rasjid announced the full structure of the National Campaign Team.

18 October 2023 – Megawati officially declared that Mahfud MD, the Coordinating Minister for Political, Legal, and Security Affairs, would run as Ganjar Pranowo’s vice presidential running mate.

19 October 2023 – Ganjar Pranowo and Mahfud MD officially registered with the General Elections Commission (KPU-RI).

== Candidates ==
Name	Born (Age)	Party	Position(s)	Ref.
Ganjar Pranowo (Presidential Candidate)	October 28, 1968 (age 57); Karanganyar, Central Java	Indonesian Democratic Party of Struggle	Member of the People's Representative Council (2004–2013)	
Ganjar Pranowo (Presidential Candidate)	October 28, 1968 (age 57); Karanganyar, Central Java	Indonesian Democratic Party of Struggle	15th Governor of Central Java (2013–2023)	
Mohammad Mahfud Mahmodin (Vice Presidential Candidate)	May 13, 1957 (age 69); Sampang, East Java	Independent	21st Minister of Defense (2000–2001)	
Mohammad Mahfud Mahmodin (Vice Presidential Candidate)	May 13, 1957 (age 69); Sampang, East Java	Independent	24th Minister of Justice (2001)	
Mohammad Mahfud Mahmodin (Vice Presidential Candidate)	May 13, 1957 (age 69); Sampang, East Java	Independent	Member of the People's Representative Council (2004–2008)	
Mohammad Mahfud Mahmodin (Vice Presidential Candidate)	May 13, 1957 (age 69); Sampang, East Java	Independent	2nd Chief Justice of the Constitutional Court (2008–2013)	
Mohammad Mahfud Mahmodin (Vice Presidential Candidate)	May 13, 1957 (age 69); Sampang, East Java	Independent	14th Coordinating Minister for Political, Legal, and Security Affairs of Indonesia (2019–2024)	

== Aftermath ==
After losing the 2024 presidential election, Ganjar Pranowo declared his opposition to the Prabowo-Gibran government following its disbandment. He stated that he would not join Prabowo's government, as he respected the administration and wanted to exercise control in that manner.

== Member parties ==
=== Original members ===
Name		Ideology	Position	Leader(s)	2024 result	
Name		Ideology	Position	Leader(s)	Votes (%)	Seats
National party / members of DPR
PDI-P	Indonesian Democratic Party of Struggle; Partai Demokrasi Indonesia Perjuangan	Sukarnoism	Centre-left to left-wing	Megawati Sukarnoputri	16.72%	110 / 580
National party / non-members of DPR
PPP	United Development Party; Partai Persatuan Pembangunan	Pan-Islamism	Centre-right to right-wing	Muhamad Mardiono	3.87%	0 / 580
Perindo	Indonesian Unity Party; Partai Persatuan Indonesia	Populism	Centre-right	Hary Tanoesoedibjo	1.29%	0 / 580
Hanura	People's Conscience Party; Partai Hati Nurani Rakyat	Corporatism	Centre	Oesman Sapta Odang	0.72%	0 / 580

=== Leaving members ===
Name		Ideology	Position	Leader(s)	2024 result		Merger
Name		Ideology	Position	Leader(s)	Votes (%)	Seats	Merger
National party / members of DPR
PPP	United Development Party; Partai Persatuan Pembangunan	Pan-Islamism	Centre-right to right-wing	Muhamad Mardiono	3.87%	0 / 580	Advanced Indonesia Coalition (2024–present)
Perindo	Indonesian Unity Party; Partai Persatuan Indonesia	Populism	Centre-right	Angela Tanoesoedibjo	1.29%	0 / 580	Advanced Indonesia (2024–present)

== General election results ==
Election	Total seats won	Share of seats	Total votes	Share of votes	Outcome of election
2024	110 / 580	18.96%	34,313,111	22.60%	▼37 seats (2019 result)

== See also ==
- Ganjar Pranowo 2024 presidential campaign
