= Joko Widodo 2019 presidential campaign =

2019 presidential campaign of Jokowi

Joko Widodo for President
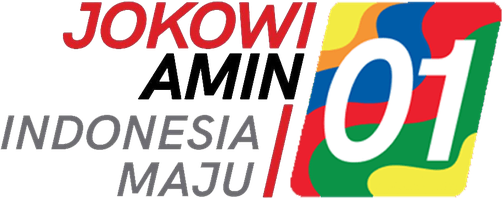
- Campaign: 2019 Indonesian presidential election
- Candidate: Joko Widodo; President of Indonesia (2014–2024); Governor of Jakarta (2012–2014); Ma'ruf Amin; Chairman of MUI (2015–2020); General Leader of NU (2015–2018)
- Affiliation: Onward Indonesia Coalition
- Status: Registered: 10 August 2018; Authorized: 20 September 2018; Won election: 21 May 2019; Inaugurated: 20 October 2019
- Headquarters: High End Building, Kebon; Sirih, Menteng, Jakarta
- Key people: Chief executive: Erick Thohir; Secretary: Hasto Kristiyanto Advisers: Megawati Soekarnoputri; Muhaimin Iskandar; Oesman Sapta Odang; Surya Paloh; Airlangga Hartarto
- Slogan(s): Indonesia Maju (Onward Indonesia)

Website
- jokowiamin.id

Joko Widodo's presidential campaign in 2019 was Joko Widodo's second presidential bid, following his first campaign's success in the 2014 presidential election. The campaign aimed for Joko Widodo's re-election, with Islamic cleric Ma'ruf Amin as his running mate in a rematch against Prabowo Subianto.

== Background ==
Joko Widodo was sworn in as President of Indonesia on 20 October 2014 after defeating Prabowo Subianto in the 2014 Indonesian presidential election. His presidency initially saw low approval ratings - less than 30% in early 2015 - which eventually doubled by late 2017.

== Team ==
Businessman Erick Thohir chaired the campaign team, which consisted of various politicians from the coalition parties. At the time of the initial announcement, campaign team also included three sitting ministers - Sri Mulyani, Pramono Anung and Puan Maharani - and three governors - Ridwan Kamil, Muhammad Zainul Majdi, and Lukas Enembe. The latter two governors were members of the Democratic Party, which supported Prabowo's campaign. The team was dubbed as the "National Campaign Team" (Indonesian: Tim Kampanye Nasional, TKN) of the Working Indonesia Coalition (Indonesian: Koalisi Indonesia Kerja).

== Timeline ==
=== Pre-registration ===
Although some of the government coalition parties such as Nasdem have declared an endorsement as early as 2017, Jokowi's party PDI-P did not officially endorse Jokowi until February 2018. Following low approvals in his first year, Jokowi enjoyed relatively high approval ratings despite some issues with approval on poverty reduction. By May 2018, the coalition of parties endorsing Jokowi had included five parties which covered 290 out of 560 seats in the parliament - far above the needed threshold of 112 seats, not including new parties such as the Indonesian Solidarity Party (PSI) and the Indonesian Unity Party (Perindo).

Following the declaration, there were some uncertainty over Jokowi's running mate - with the incumbent vice president Jusuf Kalla constitutionally barred from a third vice presidential term. Many possible candidates were speculated, and by July 2018 coalition member United Development Party chairman Muhammad Romahurmuziy remarked that the possible candidates had been narrowed down to 10 names.

On 9 August, Jokowi eventually declared Islamic cleric and Indonesian Ulema Council leader Ma'ruf Amin as his running mate, despite strong speculation in the final hours leading to the decision that Mahfud MD, former Chief Justice of the Constitutional Court, would be selected.

=== Campaigning ===
After being verified, Jokowi-Ma'ruf was assigned the ballot number 1 on 21 September 2018.

== Positions ==
The campaign's declared missions included "accelerating, developing and furthering [the previous term's main priorities]" with emphasis on human resources development.

== Finances ==
The campaign team reported an initial starting balance of Rp 11.9 billion (around US$800,000), and by January 2019 the reported total funds had increased to Rp 56 billion (around US$3.8 million).

== Controversies ==
The Prabowo campaign team have accused Jokowi's government of non-neutrality in the election, citing a village chief in East Java who was prosecuted for accusations of mobilizing a group to welcome Sandiaga Uno during the latter's campaigning.

During a campaign speech in Surabaya, Jokowi accused Prabowo's campaign team of disseminating hateful propaganda aided by foreign consultants, citing "Russian propaganda" and the "firehose of falsehood" model. Russia's ambassador to Indonesia Lyudmila Vorobyeva protested the use of the term, stating that Russia does not intervene in domestic affairs of other countries.

In January 2019 it was rumored by Yusril Ihza Mahendra that Jokowi was considering releasing Islamist Abu Bakar Ba'asyir due to old age and declining health. The move was seen as controversial in Indonesia as part of a growing number of actions taken by Jokowi to appease Indonesia's conservative Muslims ahead of the election. The government later suspended this attempt as Ba'asyir refused to accept Pancasila as his ideology, instead sticking to his fundamentalist Islam point of view.

== Coalition parties ==
- Indonesian Democratic Party of Struggle (PDI-P)
- Golkar
- National Awakening Party (PKB)
- NasDem Party
- United Development Party (PPP)
- People's Conscience Party (Hanura)
- Crescent Star Party (PBB)
- Indonesian Justice and Unity Party (PKPI)
- Indonesian Solidarity Party (PSI)
- Indonesia Unity Party (Perindo)

== Gallery ==
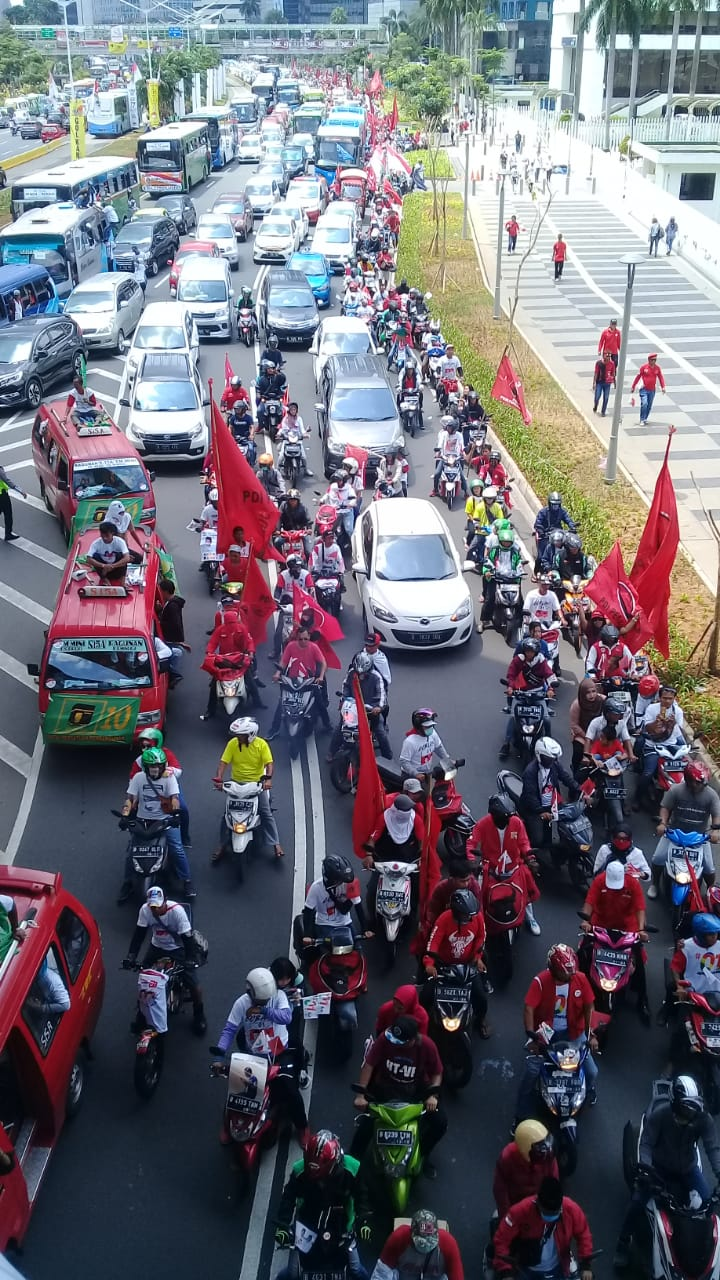
A motorcade of supporters of Jokowi from various parties (PPP, Golkar, and PDIP).

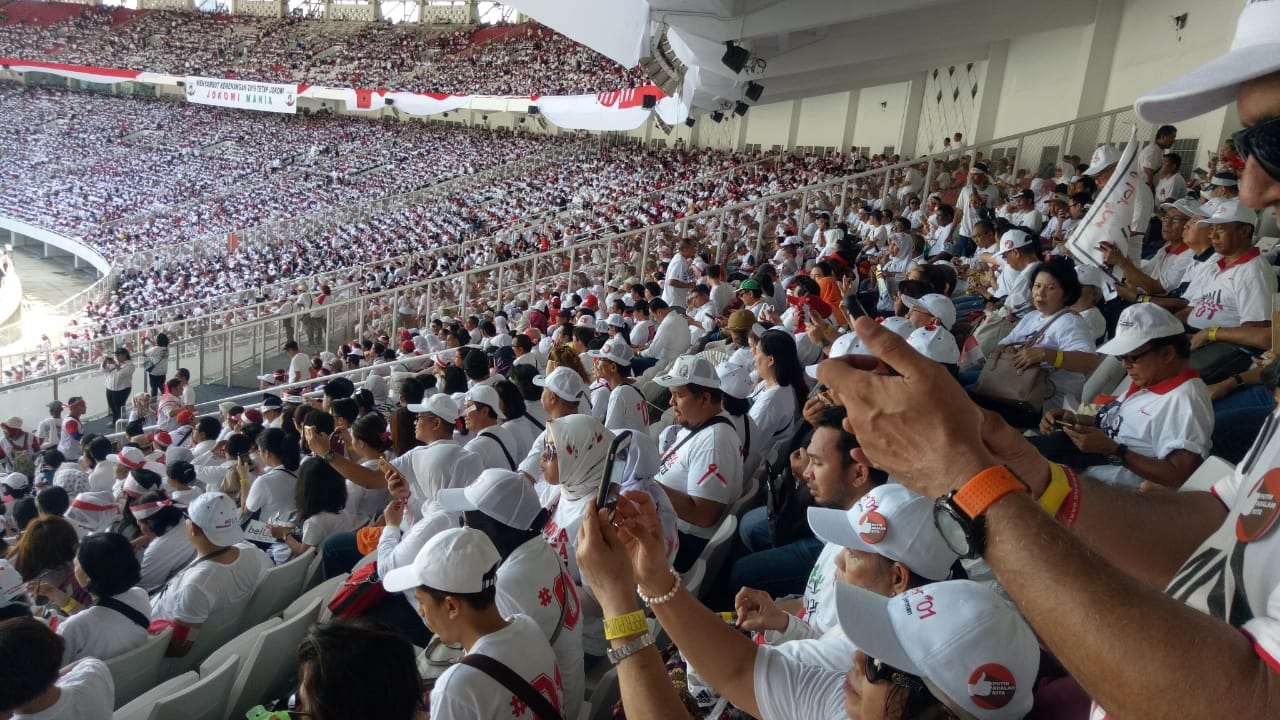
Supporters of Jokowi rallying in a mass campaign in GBK.

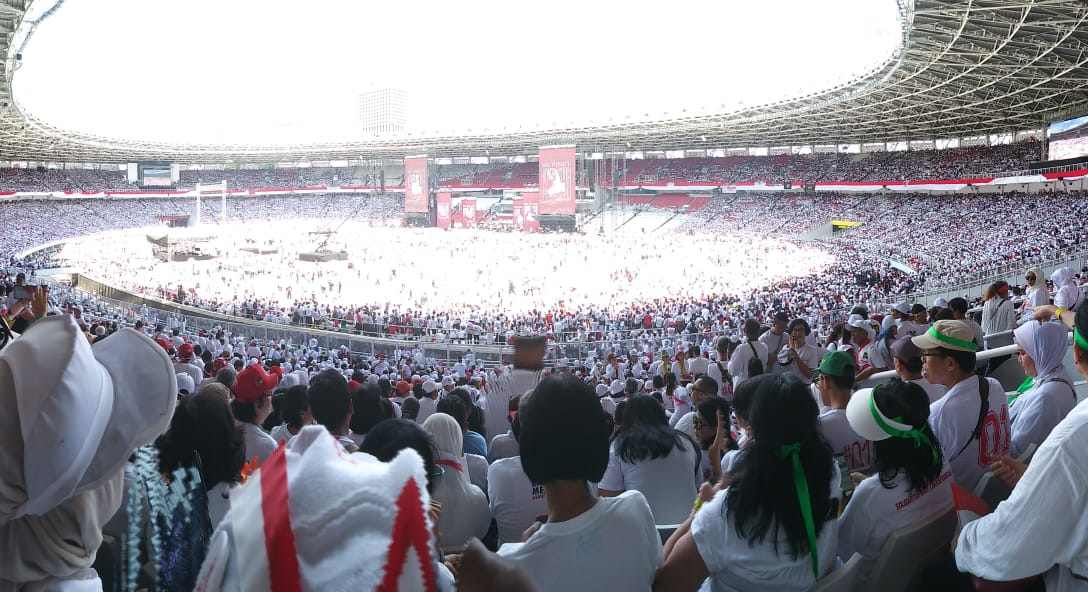

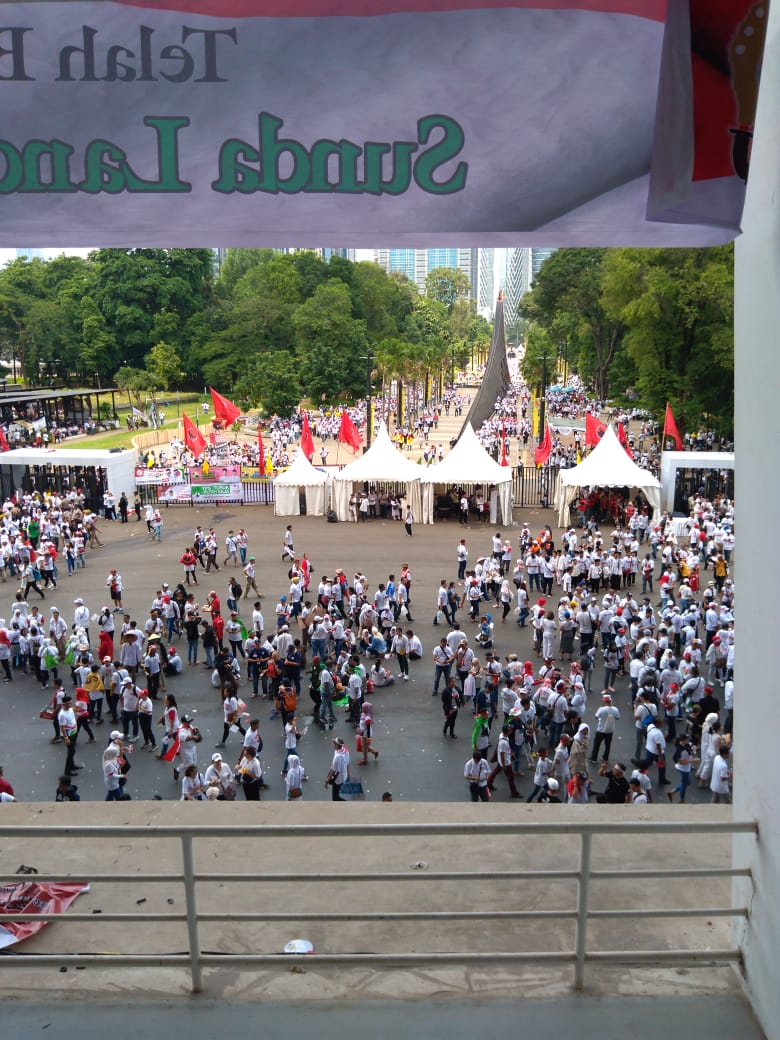
Supporters of Jokowi outside GBK.
