= United Indonesia Coalition =

Political alliance in Indonesia (2022–2023)

United Indonesia Coalition Koalisi Indonesia Bersatu
- Abbreviation: KIB
- Founder: Airlangga Hartarto; Zulkifli Hasan; Suharso Monoarfa
- Founded: 13 May 2022; 4 years ago
- Dissolved: 13 August 2023; 2 years ago
- Preceded by: Onward Indonesia Coalition
- Succeeded by: Advanced Indonesia Coalition; Alliance of Parties
- Ideology: Pancasila; Developmentalism; Indonesian nationalism Economic liberalism Conservatism; Factions: Islamic democracy Religious nationalism National conservatism
- Political position: Centre to centre-right Factions: Right-wing
- Member parties: Golkar Party; National Mandate Party; United Development Party
- Colours: Yellow; Green; Blue
- DPR RI: 148 / 575
- DPRD I: 566 / 2,232
- DPRD II: 4,668 / 17,340

The United Indonesia Coalition (Indonesian: Koalisi Indonesia Bersatu, KIB) was an official political coalition in Indonesia that was formed through a political agreement between three political parties from the Onward Indonesia Coalition. These parties include Golkar, the National Mandate Party (PAN), and the United Development Party (PPP). The coalition was established in preparation for the 2024 Indonesian presidential election.

On 12 May 2022, the leaders of the constituent parties held a meeting in Menteng, Central Jakarta. The three leaders involved were Airlangga Hartarto from Golkar, Zulkifli Hasan from PAN, and Suharso Monoarfa from PPP. The word "United" carries a philosophical meaning within the coalition, representing Beringin, Surya, and Baitullah, which are the symbols associated with each of the political parties involved in the coalition.

On April 26, 2023, the PPP officially announced its separate support for presidential candidate Ganjar Pranowo, which was previously supported by PDI-P on April 21, 2023. However, the member parties stated that this coalition is not disbanded.

On August 13, 2023, at the Proclamation Writing Museum, Golkar and PAN declared their support for Prabowo Subianto and joined the Gerindra and PKB coalition which is known as the Great Indonesia Awakening Coalition (Indonesian: Koalisi Kebangkitan Indonesia Raya, KKIR) and later known as the Advanced Indonesia Coalition.

== Potential candidates ==
=== Presidential candidates ===
- Airlangga Hartarto, Coordinating Minister for Economic Affairs and General Chairmen of the Golkar Party.
- Prabowo Subianto, Minister of Defense and General Chairman of the Gerindra Party
- Ganjar Pranowo, Governor of Central Java

=== Vice Presidential Candidates ===
- Airlangga Hartarto, Coordinating Minister for Economic Affairs and General Chairman of the Golkar Party.
- Zulkifli Hasan, Minister of Trade and General Chairmen of the National Mandate Party.
- Ridwan Kamil, Governor of West Java
- Erick Thohir, Minister of State-Owned Enterprises and Chairman of the Footbal Association of Indonesia
- Sandiaga Uno, Minister of Tourism and Creative Economy

== Member parties ==
Name		Ideology	Position	Leader(s)	2019 result	
Name		Ideology	Position	Leader(s)	Votes (%)	Seats
Golkar	Party of the Functional Groups; Partai Golongan Karya	National conservatism	Centre-right to right-wing	Airlangga Hartarto	12.31%	85 / 575
PAN	National Mandate Party; Partai Amanat Nasional	Religious nationalism	Centre to centre-right	Zulkifli Hasan	6.84%	44 / 575
PPP	United Development Party; Partai Persatuan Pembangunan	Pan-Islamism	Centre-right to right-wing	Muhamad Mardiono	4.52%	19 / 575
