= Agung Laksono =

Indonesian politician and businessman (born 1949)

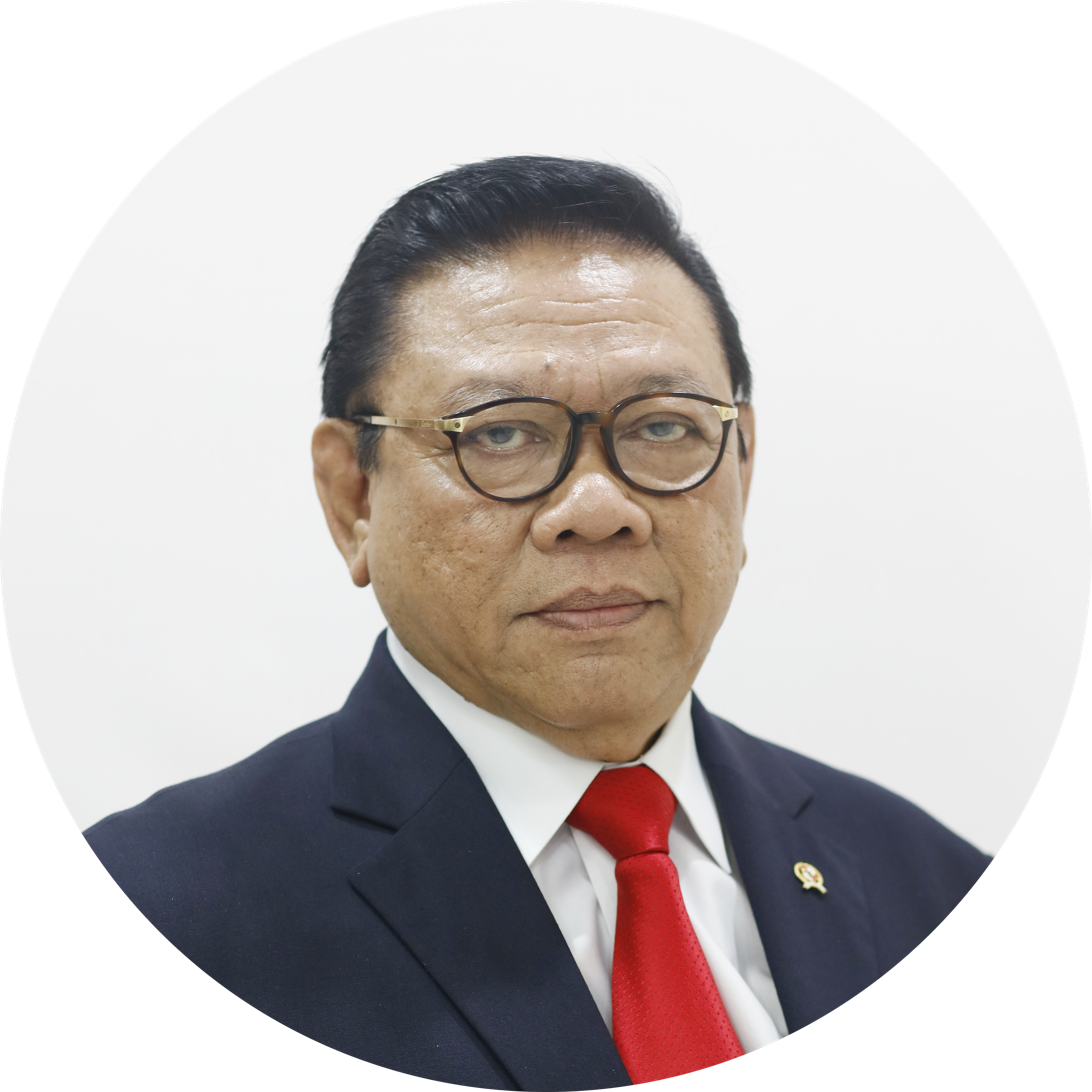
- Official portrait, 2019

Member of the Presidential Advisory Council
- In office 13 December 2019 – 20 October 2024
- President: Joko Widodo
- Chairman: Wiranto

15th Coordinating Minister for People's Welfare
- In office 22 October 2009 – 20 October 2014
- President: Susilo Bambang Yudhoyono
- Preceded by: Aburizal Bakrie
- Succeeded by: Puan Maharani

14th Speaker of the House of Representatives
- In office 1 October 2004 – 30 September 2009
- Preceded by: Akbar Tandjung
- Succeeded by: Marzuki Alie

Member of House of Representatives
- In office 1 October 2004 – 30 September 2009
- Constituency: DKI Jakarta I
- In office 1 October 1987 – 30 September 1999
- Constituency: DKI Jakarta

7th Minister of Youth and Sports
- Acting; 7 December 2012 – 15 January 2013
- President: Susilo Bambang Yudhoyono
- Preceded by: Andi Alfian Mallarangeng
- Succeeded by: Roy Suryo
- In office 26 March 1998 – 27 September 1999
- President: Suharto; B. J. Habibie
- Preceded by: Hayono Isman
- Succeeded by: Juwono Sudarsono (acting); Mahadi Sinambela

Personal details
- Born: 23 March 1949 (age 77) Semarang, Indonesia
- Party: Golkar
- Education: Christian University of Indonesia (dr.)
- Occupation: Politician; businessman

Agung Laksono (born 23 March 1949) is an Indonesian politician and businessman who was a member of the Presidential Advisory Council from 2019 to 2024. A member of Golkar, Agung previously served as Coordinating Minister for People's Welfare in the Second United Indonesia Cabinet from 2009 to 2014 and as Speaker of the House of Representatives from 2004 to 2009.

Born in Semarang, on 23 March 1949, he completed his primary and secondary education at SMA Negeri 4 Medan. He continued his studies at the Christian University of Indonesia at the Faculty of Medicine and graduated in 1972. He started his political career in the Golkar Party by serving as Chairman of the Youth Forces of the Golkar Party from 1984 until 1989.

Laksono would go on to serve as Director of PT Horizon Andalas Televisi, now known as ANTV from 1993 until 1998 and Minister of Youth and Sports in the Development Cabinet VII in the government of President Suharto. In 1999, he entered the People's Representative Council. In 2004, he replaced Akbar Tandjung as Speaker of the People's Representative Council, going to serve from 2004 until 2009.

He was appointed by President Susilo Bambang Yudhoyono as Coordinating Minister for People's Welfare from 2009 until 2014. On 7 December 2012, he was appointed to serve as Acting Minister of Youth and Sports replacing Andi Mallarangeng, following Andi's resignation over alleged corruption case of the Hambalang sports facility construction project in Bogor, West Java. Being succeeded by Roy Suryo. On 28 May 2014, he was also appointed Acting Minister of Religious Affairs replacing Suryadharma Ali who officially resigned after alleged corruption. He was soon replaced by Lukman Hakim Saifuddin who was officially inaugurated by the President on 9 June 2014.

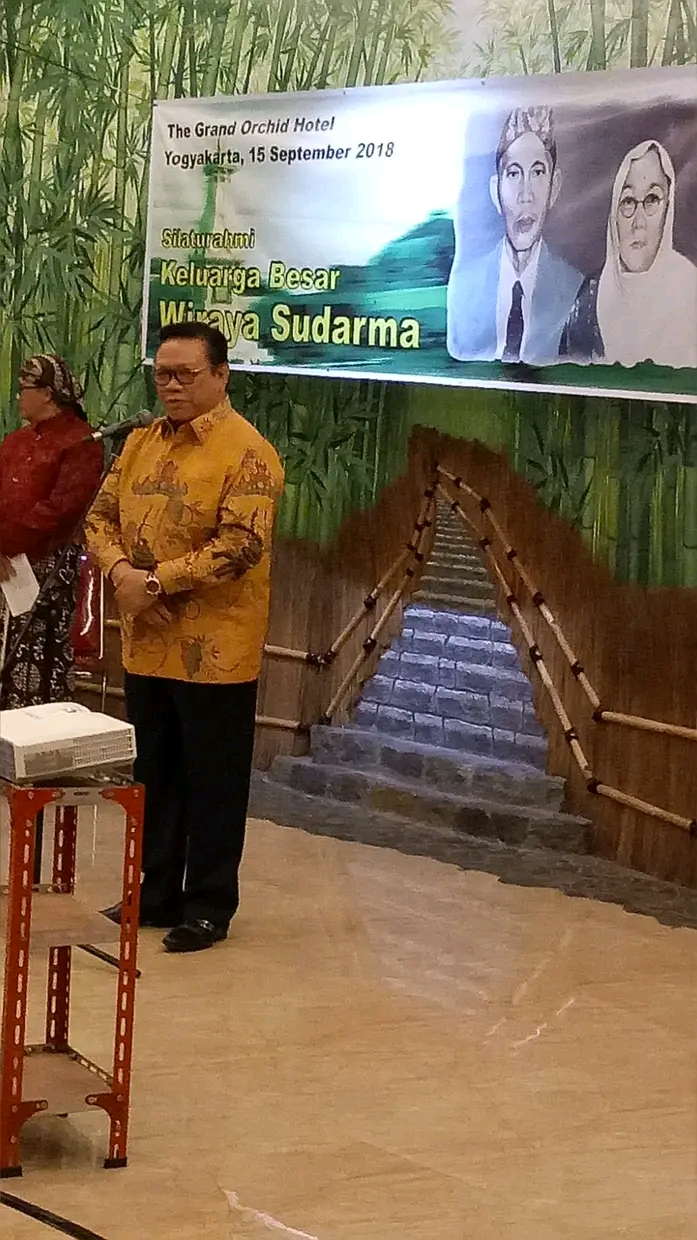
Agung Laksono in Yogyakarta, meeting and gathering his parent big family

On 13 December 2019, President Joko Widodo appointed Laksono and 8 others to become members of the Presidential Advisory Council with Wiranto as chairman.

== Early life, education, and early career ==
=== Early life and education ===
Agung Laksono was born in Semarang on 23 March 1949. He completed his primary and secondary education at SMA Negeri 4 Medan. He continued his studies at the Indonesian Christian University at the Faculty of Medicine and graduated in 1972.

=== Early career ===
He started his political career in the Golkar Party by serving as Chairman of the Youth Forces of the Golkar Party from 1984 until 1989.

== Political career ==
Laksono would go on to serve as Minister of Youth and Sports in the Development Cabinet VII in the government of President Suharto. In 1999, he entered the People's Representative Council. In 2004, he replaced Akbar Tandjung as Speaker of the People's Representative Council, going to serve from 2004 until 2009.

He was appointed by President Susilo Bambang Yudhoyono as Coordinating Minister for People's Welfare from 2009 until 2014. On 7 December 2012, he was appointed to serve as Acting Minister of Youth and Sports replacing Andi Mallarangeng, following Andi's resignation over alleged corruption case of the Hambalang sports facility construction project in Bogor, West Java, being succeeded by Roy Suryo. On 28 May 2014, he was also appointed Acting Minister of Religious Affairs replacing Suryadharma Ali who officially resigned after alleged corruption. He was soon replaced by Lukman Hakim Saifuddin who was officially inaugurated by the President on 9 June 2014.

On December 13, 2019, President Joko Widodo appointed Laksono and 8 others to become members of the Presidential Advisory Council with Wiranto as chairman.

== Political positions ==
=== Iran nuclear program ===
Laksono is a supporter of Iran's nuclear program.

== Business ventures ==
=== Adam Air ===
He was a co-founder of Adam Air, a now defunct commercial airline, which was heavily embroiled in corruption as well as various safety violations. Adam Air was closed down after a series of accidents.

== Controversy ==
Laksono is known for critical remarks toward Singapore in response to the island republic's diplomatic calls to the Indonesian government to curb acrid trans-boundary haze that shroud large areas of Sumatra, Peninsular Malaysia and Singapore annually as a result of extensive "slash and burn" cultivation in Sumatra, Kalimantan and other Indonesian territories. His remarks were viewed as without sound justification, aimed at rousing nationalistic sentiments without constructively resolving the issue at hand.

In the 2013 Southeast Asian haze, PSI levels across many parts of Johor, Malacca, Selangor and Singapore reached hazardous levels as the number of hotspots in neighbouring Riau province, Sumatra, climbed to 148. Laksono lambasted Singaporeans for "behaving like a child" when the city-state stepped up pressure on the Indonesian government to take definitive action to extinguish the Sumatran forest fires and bring those responsible to justice through stricter enforcement of laws against indiscriminate burning. When a Singaporean official offered assistance to tackle the recurrent haze problem at an emergency meeting held in Jakarta, Laksono responded, "If it is only half a million, or one million dollars, we don't need that. We would rather use our own national budget."

Singapore's Prime Minister Lee Hsien Loong mentioned in a press conference that "It’s not fruitful to respond to such comments. It would be in the best interests of both countries to work on the problem together rather than exchanging harsh words." Lee also repeated an offer to help Indonesia.

Laksono also told reporters that "Indonesian citizens also need to be looked after" before tending to other countries' interests, even though the world's largest archipelago is observed to be the primary source of the annual regional smog. While playing the victim card, he squarely fended off the blame to foreign-owned companies and elements beyond his nation's control. He argued that it was "not what Indonesians want, it's nature", despite the fact that it was clear even in the haze that were razing large areas of forested land for commercial plantations were certainly man-made events.

Laksono also reportedly remarked on more than one occasion that Indonesia's neighbours do not appreciate the fresh air that Indonesian forests bring to them, but complained about the haze when it only happens occasionally.

Political offices
Preceded by Aburizal Bakrie	Coordinating Minister of People's Welfare; 2009–2014	Succeeded by Puan Maharani
Preceded by Akbar Tandjung	Speaker of the House of Representatives; 2004–2009	Succeeded by Marzuki Alie
