= Suryadharma Ali =

5th Chairman of the United Development Party (1956–2025)

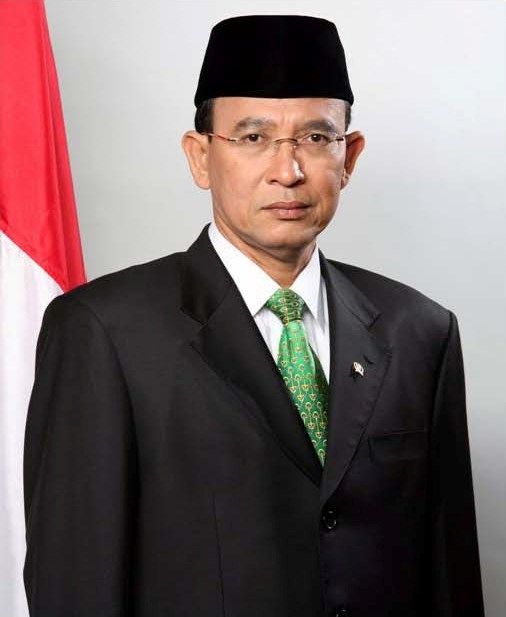
- Official portrait, 2009

21st Minister of Religious Affairs of Indonesia
- In office 22 October 2009 – 28 May 2014
- President: Susilo Bambang Yudhoyono
- Preceded by: Muhammad Maftuh Basyuni
- Succeeded by: Agung Laksono (acting); Lukman Hakim Saifuddin

State Minister for Cooperative and Small, Medium Enterprises
- In office 21 October 2004 – 1 October 2009
- Preceded by: Alimarwan Hanan
- Succeeded by: Mari Elka Pangestu (ad-interim); Syarief Hasan

Member of the People's Representative Council
- In office 1 October 2009 – 22 October 2009
- Succeeded by: Amin Suparmin
- Constituency: West Java III
- In office 1 October 1999 – 21 October 2004
- Constituency: Central Java (1999–2004); Jakarta I (2004)

5th Chairman of the United Development Party
- In office 3 February 2007 – 10 September 2014
- Preceded by: Hamzah Haz
- Succeeded by: Muhammad Romahurmuziy

Personal details
- Born: 19 September 1956 Jakarta, Indonesia
- Died: 31 July 2025 (aged 68) Jakarta, Indonesia
- Party: PPP
- Spouse: Wardatul Asriah
- Children: Kartika Yudistira Suryadharma; Sherlita Nabila Suryadharma; Abdurrahman Sagara Prakasa; Nadia Jesica Nurul Wardani
- Education: Syarif Hidayatullah State Islamic University Jakarta
- Profession: Politician

Suryadharma Ali (19 September 1956 – 31 July 2025) was an Indonesian politician. He was the chairman of the United Development Party from 2007 to 2014 as well as the Minister of Religious Affairs from 2009 to 2014 and the Minister of Micro, Small, and Medium Enterprises from 2004 to 2009 under then-president Susilo Bambang Yudhoyono.

== Education ==
He had 5 younger siblings. He received education in SDN Tanjung Priok, Pesantren Darul Qur'an Cisarua Bogor, and SLTA and Pesantren Al Falak Pegentongan Bogor. He completed undergraduate education in IAIN Syarif Hidayatullah Faculty of Tarbiyah Islamic Studies program on 1984 and postgraduate education on sociology in the University of Indonesia Faculty of Social and Political Sciences on 2003. At college, he was the Indonesian Islamic Student Movement (Pergerakan Mahasiswa Islam Indonesia, PMII) Ciputat Branch Chairperson. After graduating, on PMII Congress VII in Bandung, he was elected the 1985-1988 PMII Board Chairperson, beating Iqbal Assegaf by one vote. On 2013, he received an honorary doctorate in Islamic studies epistemology from UIN Malang.

== Professional career ==
On 1985, he started working at Hero Supermarket, and on 1999, he became its deputy director. He were also active in various Indonesian retail association organisations.

== Political career ==
In February 2007, he was elected the United Development Party chairperson, replacing Hamzah Haz. His chairpersonship was assisted by vice chairperson Chozin Chumaidy, secretary-general Irgan Mahfiz, treasurer Suharso Monoarfa, central advisory council head Bachtiar Chamsyah, syariah council head KH Maimun Zubair, and expert council head Barlianta Harahap.

Throughout his career, Suryadharma was seen as a religious traditionalist who was often unwilling to compromise on issues. As religious affairs minister Suryadharma was unwilling to extend government recognition to the Baháʼí Faith, a minority group in the country.

== Corruption case ==
On 23 May 2014, Suryadharma was indicted in a corruption scandal involving illicit use of funds intended for the Hajj. In 2018 Suryadharma was convicted and ordered to pay 27 billion RS to the state. He was sentenced to six years in jail and fined 300 million rupiah. Shortly after being accused in 2014, Suryadharma resigned as minister of religious affairs.

== Death ==
Suryadharma died at the Mayapada Hospital in Kuningan, South Jakarta, Jakarta on 31 July 2025 4.25 WIB, at the age of 68. He was buried after Zuhr at Pesantren Miftahul'Ulum, Bekasi Regency.

=== Honours ===
Indonesia:

- Bintang Mahaputera Adipradana (10 August 2013)
