= Muhamad Mardiono =

Indonesian politician

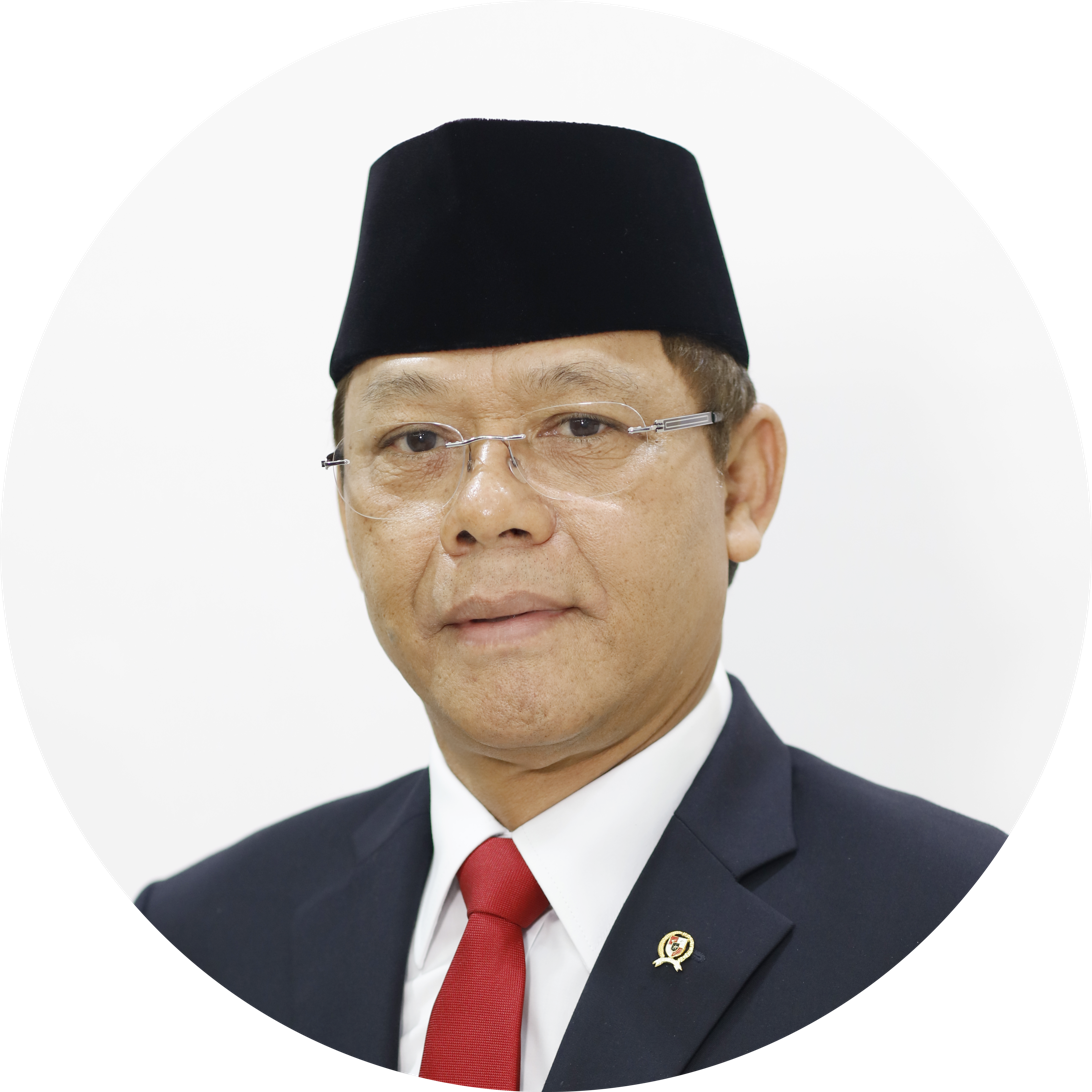

Member of Presidential Advisory Council
- In office 13 December 2019 – November 2022 Serving with List: Sidarto Danusubroto; Agung Laksono; Muhammad Luthfi bin Yahya; Soekarwo; Arifin Panigoro; Tahir; Putri Kuswisnuwardhani
- President: Joko Widodo
- Chairman: Wiranto
- Succeeded by: Djan Faridz

8th Chairman of the United Development Party
- Incumbent
- Assumed office 5 September 2022
- Preceded by: Suharso Monoarfa

Personal details
- Born: 11 July 1957 (age 69) Yogyakarta, Indonesia
- Party: United Development Party
- Occupation: Businessman; Politician

Muhamad Mardiono (born 11 July 1957) is an Indonesian businessman and politician of the United Development Party. He has served as the party's chairman since September 2022, and was previously a member of the Presidential Advisory Council between 2019 and November 2022.

== Early life ==
Muhamad Mardiono was born in Yogyakarta on 11 July 1957. He studied at an elementary school in Yogyakarta, before moving to Magelang for his middle and high school. He graduated from high school in 1976.

== Career ==
Mardiono owns a number of companies, including those operating gas stations, providing logistical services, and supplying the Indonesian National Armed Forces. Most of his companies are based in Banten, and he served as chairman of the province's chamber of commerce between 2002 and 2007. In a 2022 self-report to the Corruption Eradication Commission, Mardiono put the value of his assets at Rp 1.27 trillion (USD 85 million), half of which were in land assets.

By 2016, Mardiono had become a member of the United Development Party and was put forward as a potential candidate for the party in the 2017 Banten gubernatorial election. He was also the party's chairman in Banten, and for some time was its national deputy chairman under Muhammad Romahurmuziy. He was appointed into the Presidential Advisory Council in 2019, and served in the body until November 2022. In 2020, he stated his intent to run as the party's chairman, but decided to cancel his bid, thus allowing Suharso Monoarfa to be elected chairman by acclamation.

Suharso lost his chairmanship in September 2022 following a poorly-received public statement regarding kyai behavior. On 5 September 2022, Mardiono who at that point served as chairman of PPP's advisory committee was appointed to replace him. On 23 November 2022, president Joko Widodo appointed him as Special Presidential Envoy for Poverty Eradication and Food Security.
