= Lukman Hakim Saifuddin =

Indonesian politician

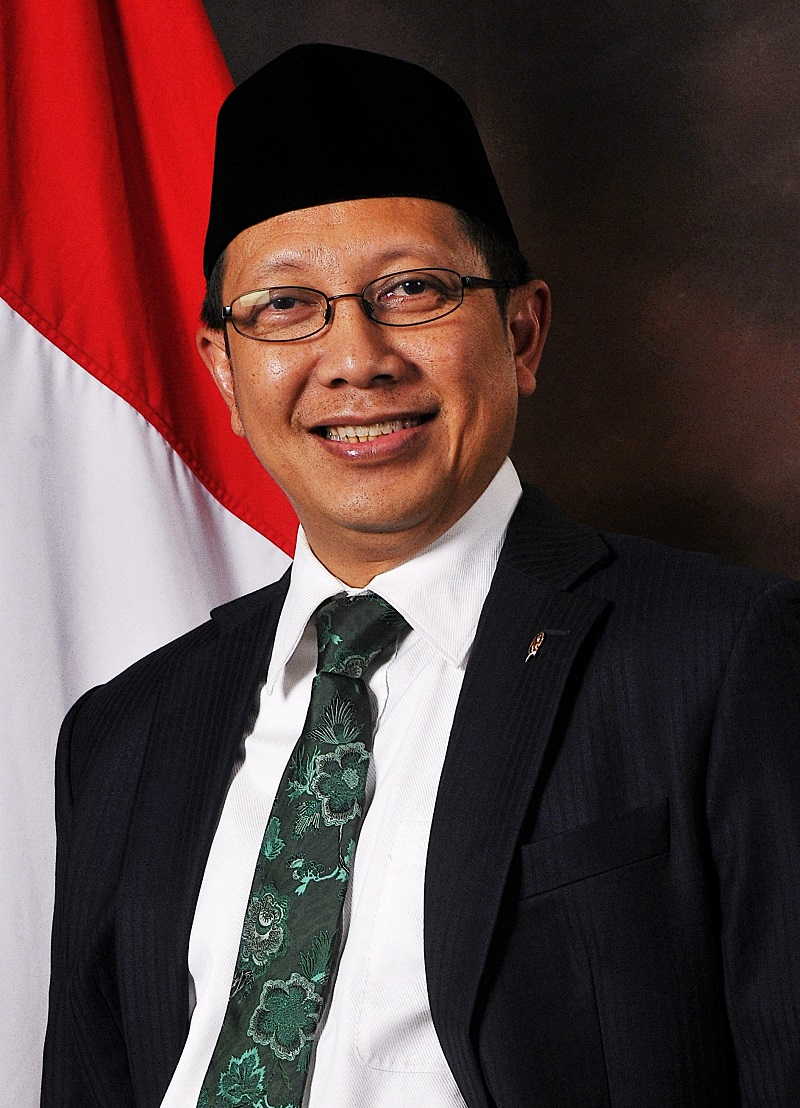

22nd Minister of Religious Affairs of Indonesia
- In office 9 June 2014 – 20 October 2019
- President: Susilo Bambang Yudhoyono; Joko Widodo
- Preceded by: Suryadharma Ali; Agung Laksono (acting)
- Succeeded by: Fachrul Razi

Member of the People's Representative Council
- In office 1 October 1997 – 8 June 2014

Personal details
- Born: 25 November 1962 (age 63) Jakarta, Indonesia
- Citizenship: Indonesian
- Party: United Development Party
- Spouse: Trisna Willy
- Relations: K. H. Saifuddin Zuhri (Father)
- Children: Naufal Zilal Kemal; Zahira Humaira; Sabilla Salsabila `
- Education: Universitas Islam As-Syafiiyah
- Profession: Politician
- Cabinet: Second United Indonesia Cabinet; Working Cabinet

Lukman Hakim Saifuddin (born 25 November 1962) is an Indonesian politician and Muslim scholar who was the Minister of Religious Affairs in the Second United Indonesia Cabinet of President Susilo Bambang Yudhoyono and Working Cabinet of President Joko Widodo.

Saifuddin is considered more moderate than his predecessor, Suryadharma Ali. As former party whip of the United Development Party (PPP) in the People's Representative Council, Saifuddin pulled the PPP closer to the political center. Also unlike Ali, Saifuddin has indicated a willingness as Religious Affairs Minister to extend recognition to the Baháʼí Faith, a minority group in the country. Saifuddin also participated with Indonesian Buddhists in a joint prayer in Medan in November 2016. Conversely, he also urged Muslims in Indonesia to pray for the Rohingya minority in Myanmar in reaction to the 2016 Rohingya persecution in Myanmar, and stated that the Government of Indonesia was monitoring the situation.

Saifuddin also cautioned against follow-up protests to the November 2016 Jakarta protests against the Christian governor of Jakarta accused of blasphemy, stating that formal charges had been brought to a court of law and that there was no justification for further protests.

== Early life, education, and early career ==
=== Early life ===
Lukman Hakim Saifuddin was born in Jakarta, on 25 November 1962. His father, Saifuddin Zuhri, was a politician, journalist, educator and Muslim cleric, who was Minister of Religious Affairs under president Sukarno, from 1962 until 1967 while his mother was a woman named Solichah.

=== Education ===
As a child, Lukman Hakim studied religion from his mother. He went to SDN Jakarta for elementary school, and SMPN XI Jakarta for junior high school. After this, he entered the Pondok Modern Darussalam Gontor in Ponorogo, East Java, graduating in 1983, at the age of 21.

Following his graduation from Gontor, Lukman Hakim studied at the Faculty of Da'wah at As-Syafiiyah Islamic University in Jakarta. During university, Saifuddin excelled in the fields of study, training and research. It was also during this time that he became active in the management of the Nadhlatul Ulama (NU), a traditionalist Sunni Islamist movement. He graduated with a bachelor's in 1990.

=== Early career ===
Even in university, he was active in managing the Nadhlatul Ulama. He was appointed Deputy Secretary of the Central Executive Board of the Nadhlatul Ulama Family Welfare Institution (LKKNU) from 1985 until 1988. Later he was involved in the Nadhlatul Ulama Research and Development Center (Lakpesdam) as Deputy Secretary, Head of General Administration, Study and Research Program Coordinator, Education and Training Program Coordinator, until he became Chairman of the Governing Body from 1996 until 1999.

== Political career ==
=== People's Representative Council ===
Saifuddin became interested in politics in the early 1990s, and officially became a member of the United Development Party (PPP), an Islamist political party in early 1994. In the 1997 Indonesian legislative elections, Saifuddin was elected as a member of the People's Representative Council at the age of 35. As a member of the People's Representative Council, Saifuddin pulled the PPP closer to the political center. He was subsequently re-elected in the 1999, 2004, and 2009 legislative elections, eventually becoming the Deputy Speaker of the People's Consultative Assembly.

=== Minister of Religious Affairs ===
==== Under Yudhoyono ====
At the end of 2014, he was appointed by president Susilo Bambang Yudhoyono as Minister of Religious Affairs, replacing Suryadharma Ali, who had been indicted in a corruption scandal involving illicit use of funds intended for the hajj. As Minister of Religious Affairs in the Second United Indonesia Cabinet, he only served for three months at the end of Yudhoyono's term.

==== Under Joko Widodo ====
When Joko Widodo was elected as the new president in 2014, he was reappointed Minister of Religious Affairs in the 2014–2019 Working Indonesia Cabinet.

== Personal life ==
Saifuddin is married to Trisna Willy, and together they have three children namely, Naufal Zilal Kemal, Zahira Humaira, and Sabilla Salsabilla.

== Gallery ==
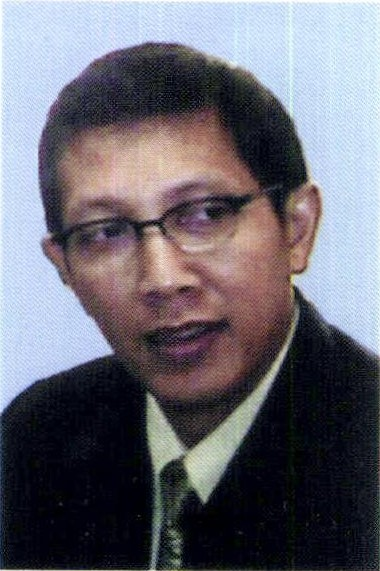
Saifuddin as a member of the People's Representative Council

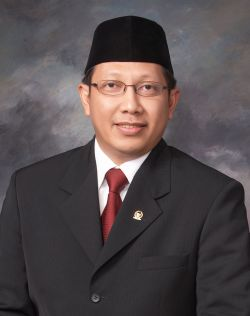
Saifuddin as Deputy Speaker

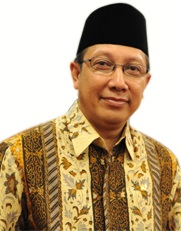
Saifuddin as Religious Affairs Minister under Yudhoyono

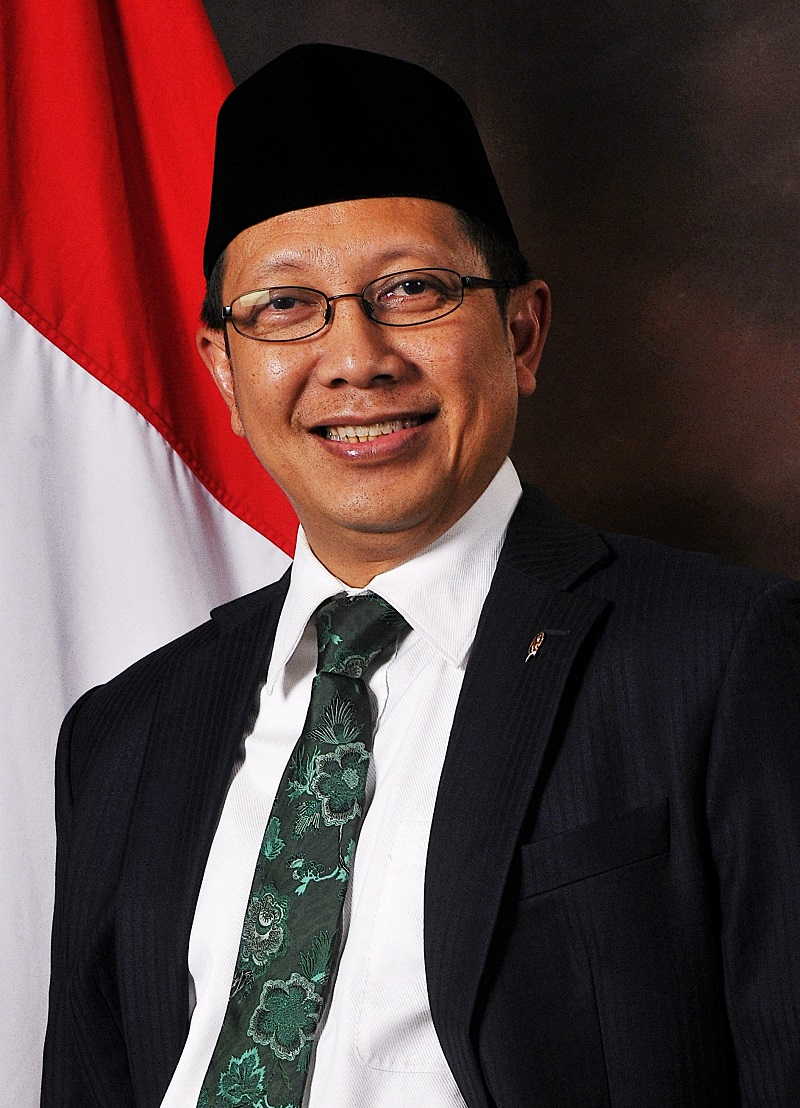
Saifuddin as Religious Affairs Minister under Joko Widodo
