= Chairman of the United Development Party =

Chairman of United Development Party
- (Ketua Umum Partai Persatuan Pembangunan)
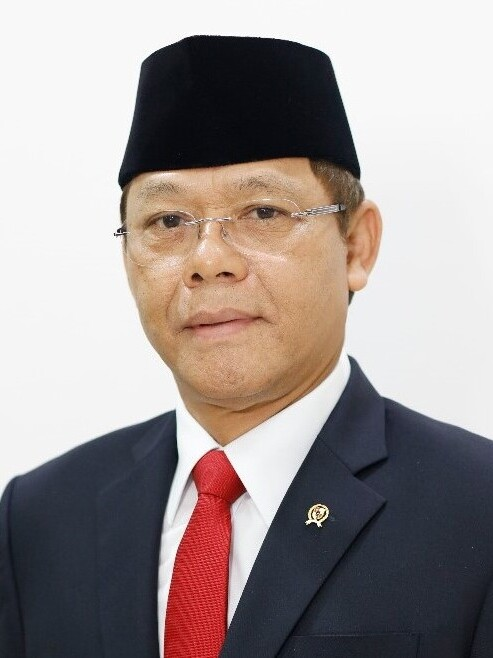
- Incumbent; Muhammad Mardiono since 28 September 2025
- United Development Party
- Type: Party leader
- Term length: Five years, renewable
- Inaugural holder: Mohammad Syafaat Mintaredja
- Formation: 5 January 1973
- Deputy: Vice Chairman; Secretary-General
- Website: https://ppp.or.id/

The general chairman of United Development Party (Ketua Umum Partai Persatuan Pembangunan) is the highest position and executive authority within United Development Party. Although the party is dominated by Nahdlatul Ulama politicians, the figure who filled the first leadership position was the former leader of Parmusi, who was also the founder of the Kaaba Party namely Mohammad Syafa'at Mintaredja. Furthermore, to elect a new chairman every time the term of office changes, a congress is held.

The current holder of the position is Muhammad Mardiono, who was elected to the position on 28 September 2025, following his victory in the party's leadership election. He has served as Special Presidential Envoy for Food Security. The chairman is not allowed to hold a duplicate department of the Leadership Council on any level of the party.

== General Chairman of the Party ==
No.	Name (Lifespan)	Portrait	Constituency / title	Took office	Left office	Election results	Government		
No.	Name (Lifespan)	Portrait	Constituency / title	Took office	Left office	Election results	Party	President	Term
Preceding parties: Nahdlatul Ulama, Parmusi, PSII and Perti
Presidium of United Development Group (1973)
-	Mohammad Syafaat Mintaredja (Note: as Periodic Chairman of the Presidium of United Development Group) (1921–1984)		Minister of Social Affair	5 January 1973	13 February 1973	None	Golkar	Suharto (Note: as Chairman of Presidium Cabinet from 25 July 1966 until 17 October 1967) (Note: as Acting president from 12 March 1967 until 27 March 1968)	1966-1998
-	Idham Chalid (1921–2010)		Rep for South Kalimantan	5 January 1973	13 February 1973	None	Golkar	Suharto	1966-1998
-	Thayeb Mohammad Gobel (1909–1975)		Rep for North Sulawesi	5 January 1973	13 February 1973	None	Golkar	Suharto	1966-1998
-	Rusli Halil (1920–1984)		Member of People's Consultative Assembly	5 January 1973	13 February 1973	None	Golkar	Suharto	1966-1998
-	Masjkur (1904–1994)		Rep for East Java	5 January 1973	13 February 1973	None	Golkar	Suharto	1966-1998
General Chairmen of the United Development Party (1973–Present)
1	Mohammad Syafaat Mintaredja (1921–1984)		Minister of Social Affairs	5 January 1973	13 February 1978		Golkar	Suharto (Note: as Chairman of Presidium Cabinet from 25 July 1966 until 17 October 1967) (Note: as Acting president from 12 March 1967 until 27 March 1968)	1966–1998
2	Jailani Naro (1929-2000)		Rep for Central Java	13 February 1978	31 August 1989	1978 Unopposed 1984 Unopposed	Golkar	Suharto	1966–1998
3	Ismail Hasan Metareum (1927-2006)		Rep for D. I. Aceh (Note: until 30 September 1992); Rep for DKI Jakarta (Note: since 1 October 1992)	31 August 1989	2 December 1998	1989 Unopposed 1994 Ismail Hasan Metareum – ✓ Matori Abdul Djalil – ✗	Golkar	Suharto	1966–1998
3	Ismail Hasan Metareum (1927-2006)		Rep for D. I. Aceh; Rep for DKI Jakarta	31 August 1989	2 December 1998	1989 Unopposed 1994 Ismail Hasan Metareum – ✓ Matori Abdul Djalil – ✗	Golkar	Habibie	1998-1999
4	Hamzah Haz (1940–2024)		Rep for DKI Jakarta (Note: until 28 October 1999); Vice President of Indonesia (Note: 26 July 2001-20 October 2004)	2 December 1998	3 February 2007 (Note: The muktamar was scheduled for May 2008. Considering that the muktamar had a short timeframe with the 2009 general election, the management and its members agreed to hold the muktamar earlier than scheduled so that Haz's term of office was reduced by almost a year.)	1998 Hamzah Haz – ✓ Ahmad Muflih Saefuddin – ✗ 2003 Unopposed	Golkar	Habibie	1998-1999
4	Hamzah Haz (1940–2024)		Rep for DKI Jakarta; Vice President of Indonesia	2 December 1998	3 February 2007	1998 Hamzah Haz – ✓ Ahmad Muflih Saefuddin – ✗ 2003 Unopposed	PKB	Wahid	1999–2001
4	Hamzah Haz (1940–2024)		Rep for DKI Jakarta; Vice President of Indonesia	2 December 1998	3 February 2007	1998 Hamzah Haz – ✓ Ahmad Muflih Saefuddin – ✗ 2003 Unopposed	PDIP	Megawati	2001-2004
4	Hamzah Haz (1940–2024)		Rep for DKI Jakarta; Vice President of Indonesia	2 December 1998	3 February 2007	1998 Hamzah Haz – ✓ Ahmad Muflih Saefuddin – ✗ 2003 Unopposed	PD	Yudhoyono	2004-2014
5	Suryadharma Ali (1956-2025)		State Minister for Cooperative and Small, Medium Enterprises (Note: 21 October 2004 – 1 October 2009) Minister of Religious Affairs (Note: 22 October 2009 - 28 May 2014)	3 February 2007	10 September 2014	2007 Suryadharma Ali – 365; Arif Mudatsir Mandan – 325; Dimyati Natakusumah – 219; Endin Sufihara – 185; Yunus Yosfiah – 46; Ali Marwah Hanan – 13; Eggie Sudjana –5 2011 Suryadharma Ali – 859; Akhmad Muqowam – 281; Ahmad Yani – 39	PD	Yudhoyono	2004-2014
–	Emron Pangkapi (born 1957); Acting		–	10 September 2014 (Note: His appointment as interim chairman occurred after Ali's term as chairman ended in 2014. However, Pangkapi's position as acting chairman was only implemented on 25 February 2016, during the national working conference. Over two years, the PPP encountered internal problems, with a dual leadership that led to the postponement of the national working conference two years before the muktamar finally took place.)	20 May 2016	2014 Unopposed	PD	Yudhoyono	2004-2014
–	Emron Pangkapi (born 1957); Acting		–	10 September 2014	20 May 2016	2014 Unopposed	PDIP	Widodo	2014-2024
6	Muhammad Romahurmuziy (born 1974)		Rep for Central Java II	20 May 2016 (Note: In 2014, Romahurmuziy was appointed as the new chairman at a muktamar held in Surabaya, and another leadership emerged, led by Djan Faridz, who recognized him as Suryadharma Ali's successor, who had also been elected chairman. During this period, the United Development Party (PPP) experienced a dual leadership between Romahurmuziy and Faridz. Ali also disowned the leadership under Romahurmuziy.)	16 March 2019 (Note: Muhammad Romahurmuziy was "relieved" as his initiative to the party's top leadership, resigned as chairman before his term ends at the next muktamar in 2021. He resigned after being named a suspect in a corruption case related to position trading within the Ministry of Religious Affairs of the Republic of Indonesia. On the same date, the party leadership agreed to appoint a new leader, who would be ratified on 20 March 2019.)	2016 Unopposed	PDIP	Widodo	2014-2024
–	Suharso Monoarfa (born 1954); Acting		Minister of National Development Planning (Note: since 23 October 2019)	20 March 2019	19 December 2020	2019 Unopposed	PDIP	Widodo	2014-2024
7	Suharso Monoarfa (born 1974)		Minister of National Development Planning	19 December 2020	5 September 2022 (Note: The party's supreme assembly ended Monoarfa's tenure as general chairman on 5 September 2022, or more precisely, before his term ends at the next muktamar in 2025.)	2020 Unopposed	PDIP	Widodo	2014-2024
–	Muhamad Mardiono (born 1957) Acting		Special Presidential Envoy for Poverty Eradication and Food Security (Note: until 20 October 2024)	5 September 2022	27 September 2025	2022 Unopposed	PDIP	Widodo	2014-2024
–	Muhamad Mardiono (born 1957) Acting		Special Presidential Envoy for Poverty Eradication and Food Security	5 September 2022	27 September 2025	2022 Unopposed	Gerindra	Subianto	Incumbent
8	Muhamad Mardiono (born 1957)		Special Presidential Envoy for Food Security (Note: since 21 October 2024)	27 September 2025	Incumbent	2025 Unopposed	Gerindra	Subianto	Incumbent
