= Hamzah Haz =

Vice President of Indonesia from 2001 to 2004

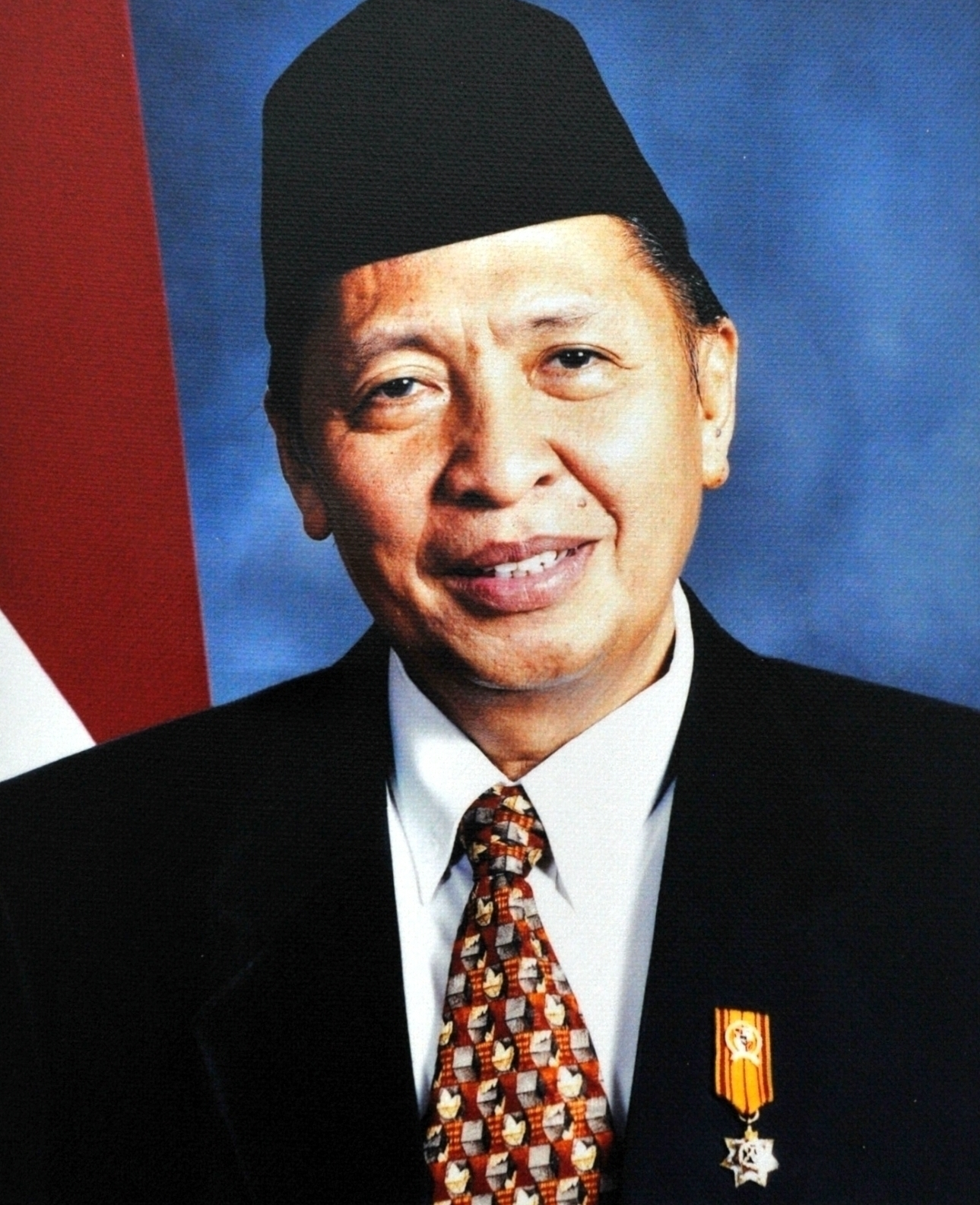
- Official portrait, 2001

9th Vice President of Indonesia
- In office 26 July 2001 – 20 October 2004
- President: Megawati Sukarnoputri
- Preceded by: Megawati Sukarnoputri
- Succeeded by: Jusuf Kalla

10th Coordinating Minister for People's Welfare and Poverty Alleviation
- In office 29 October 1999 – 26 November 1999
- President: Abdurrahman Wahid
- Preceded by: Haryono Suyono
- Succeeded by: Basri Hasanuddin

2nd Minister of Investment
- In office 23 May 1998 – 18 May 1999
- President: B. J. Habibie
- Preceded by: Sanyoto Sastrowardoyo
- Succeeded by: Marzuki Usman

4th Chairman of the United Development Party
- In office 2 December 1998 – 1 February 2007
- President: B.J. Habibie; Abdurrahman Wahid; Megawati Soekarnoputri; Susilo Bambang Yudhoyono
- Preceded by: Ismail Hasan Metareum
- Succeeded by: Suryadharma Ali
Legislative offices
Deputy Speaker of the People's Representative Council
Economy and Finance
In office 6 October 1999 – 26 October 1999
Succeeded by	Tosari Widjaja
Member of the People's Representative Council
In office 28 October 1971 – 26 October 1999
Succeeded by	Faisal Baasir
Constituency	West Kalimantan (1971–1987); East Java (1987–1992); Jakarta (1992–1999)

Personal details
- Born: 15 February 1940 Ketapang, Dutch East Indies
- Died: 24 July 2024 (aged 84) Jakarta, Indonesia
- Resting place: Cisarua, Bogor, West Java
- Party: United Development Party
- Spouses: Asmaniah Haz (m. 1964; died 2017); Tintin Kartini (died 2021); Soraya Smith
- Education: Tanjungpura University
- Occupation: Politician; legislator

Hamzah Haz (15 February 1940 – 24 July 2024) was an Indonesian politician who served as the ninth vice president of Indonesia from 2001 to 2004 under President Megawati Sukarnoputri. Prior to serving as vice president, Hamzah served as a cabinet minister and a member of the People's Representative Council (DPR). He also chaired the United Development Party (PPP) from 1998 to 2007, and was the party's presidential candidate in the 2004 Indonesian presidential election.

== Early political career ==
Hamzah was a newspaper journalist in his home town of Pontianak, on the island of Borneo, and later taught economics at Tanjungpura University. He was a lecturer at Tanjungpura University from 1968 to 1971.

His political career began in 1968 as a member of the West Kalimantan Provincial Representative Council. He later moved to Jakarta, became a member of the Parliament in 1971, representing the Jakarta electoral district, first as a member of the Muslim Nahdlatul Ulama Party. After the political fusion which joined all Islamist parties into one party and the withdrawal of Nahdlatul Ulama from politics, in 1973 he became a member of the newly formed Partai Persatuan Pembangunan (PPP). He was chairman of the PPP faction from 1989 to 1998. Hamzah served as member of People's Representative Council over 26 years and made him one of the longest-serving members of the Parliament of Indonesia.

Hamzah served as Minister for Investment under President B. J. Habibie, who replaced Suharto, then resigned that post to lead the PPP in the 1999 elections campaign, at which he was again reelected. He ran against Megawati Sukarnoputri for the vice presidency (at that time elected by the People's Consultative Assembly), winning 284 votes to Megawati's 396. On 29 Oktober 1999 he joined the cabinet of President Abdurrahman Wahid, later becoming the first person to resign from Wahid's cabinet, stepping down as Coordinating Minister for People's Welfare and Poverty Alleviation after only one month.

== Vice presidency ==
Hamzah was the leader of the (PPP), then the third-largest party in the Indonesian Parliament. He was a conservative muslim politician who had previously opposed the nomination of women leaders. However, during Wahid's impeachment trial, he retracted his statement and formed a coalition with Megawati for the vice presidential nomination in 2001. This coalition aimed to balance the power of the Islamic and nationalist axes in parliament. He was also known for his integrity and willingness to compromise.

When asked by reporters about his statement two years ago, he stated that Megawati's election was based on the 1945 constitution,

As the Vice President automatically succeeds the president until the end of his term. "so, this isn't about gender, but the law," Hamzah said when asked about his statement at the 1999 MPR general session rejecting a female president.

In the 2004 presidential election, Hamzah was one of the presidential candidates, running with Agum Gumelar. The pair finished last among the five candidates, garnering only 3 percent of the total vote.

== Advocacy for militant clerics ==
A number of journalists and commentators reported that Hamzah was believed to have offered support for militant Muslim groups as a way of gaining political support from them. In 2002, Bill Guerin, in an opinion piece in the Asia Times wrote, "Hamzah ... is widely seen as blatantly vying for support from among Indonesian Muslims, including the militant groups, to strengthen his run for the presidency in the country's next general elections in 2004."

Hamzah was also reported to be a friend of Abu Bakar Ba'asyir, who is the spiritual leader for the terrorist organization Jemaah Islamiyah. While serving as vice president, Hamzah openly invited Ba'asyir to dinner at the palace and visited pesantren (islamic boarding school). Hamzah denied that Ba'asyir was connected to terrorism up until Ba'asyir's arrest in October 2002, and was quoted as saying before Ba'asyir's arrest "If you want to arrest Abu Bakar Ba'asyir .. you will have to deal with me first.

In October 2002, an article in Time stated "That clerics like Abu Bakar Ba'asyir have powerful military and political allies is no secret: the nation's vice president Hamzah Haz is one of them." Time reported that Hamzah described his relationship with Bashir and Laskar Jihad leader Jafar Umar Thalib as "very close", but Time added, "many see this relationship as a purely political ploy to woo Muslim voters ahead of the 2004 election." Hamzah, although he "has a reputation as a wily politician" nevertheless "will be remembered for a particularly ill-judged speech before Muslim clerics at Abu Bakar's Solo boarding school in May 2002", during that visit Hamzah was also reported to have said, "If they can prove there are terrorists here I'll be the first to order an arrest", and then stepped down from the podium and kissed Abu Bakar on both cheeks.

In 2002, an Australian academic cited Hamzah as the "best example" of Islamic politicians in Indonesia "prepared to play the extremist card to attract extra votes". Hamzah "has supported Jemaah Islamiyah and has even been instrumental in having its members released from detention in the past", according to Tim Lindsey, director of the Asian Law Centre at the University of Melbourne.

On 3 September 2003 Hamzah stated, "Actually, who is the terrorist, who is against human rights? The answer is the United States because they attacked Iraq. Moreover, it is the terrorist king, waging war." According to The Sydney Morning Herald, Hamzah had also been criticised for publicly associating with several of Indonesia's more hardline Islamic leaders, including Ba'asyir, although after the Bali terrorist attack Hamzah severed those ties.

Riza Sihbudi, a political analyst at the Indonesian Institute of Sciences, told the Detik news service that Hamzah seemed to be chasing votes. "He should not have spoken like that as he is the vice president", Sihbudi said. Al Jazeera reported the day after Hamzah's statement that "There has yet to be a US reaction to the well-known firebrand's comments."

== Personal life ==
The Office of the Vice President officially states that Hamzah had two wives, Asmaniah (b. 27 July 1943), and Titin Kartini (b. 4 May 1945), with whom he had a total of 12 children. Another source states Haz had a third wife, Soraya, whom he did not officially acknowledge, and with whom he had a further three children. Soraya was seen on camera with Hamzah in an event at Bandar Lampung in 2022. His first and second wives predeceased him. Asmaniah died on 12 September 2017 and Titin died on 19 May 2021.

Hamzah Haz's son Nur Agus Haz, is a member of parliament for the United Development Party

He was a long-time cadre and senior figure of Nahdlatul Ulama, had served in various posts in the organization since he was a university student. He was disciple of Idham Chalid, a charismatic South Kalimantan Ulama and politician, and received political, religious, and spiritual training and guidance from him.

=== Degree ===
Sometimes known as Dr. Hamzah, he was reported to have obtained a PhD from American World University, an internet diploma mill (institution which improperly sells academic degrees), for US$1,200. Despite that, he used that title until his death unchallenged.

=== Death ===
Hamzah died at the Tegalan Clinic, Matraman, East Jakarta, on 24 July 2024, at the age of 84. He is buried in a private family burial plot near the mosque he built at Cisarua, Bogor.

== Honours ==
- Star of the Republic of Indonesia, 2nd Class (Indonesian: Bintang Republik Indonesia Adipradana) (2001)
- Star of Mahaputera, 1st Class (Indonesian: Bintang Mahaputera Adipurna) (2001)
- Star of Mahaputera, 2nd Class (Indonesian: Bintang Mahaputera Adipradana) (1999)

Political offices
Preceded by Megawati Sukarnoputri	Vice President of Indonesia; 26 July 2001 – 20 October 2004	Succeeded by Jusuf Kalla
