= Iqbal Assegaf =

Indonesian political activist

Muhammad Iqbal Assegaf
- محمد إقبال السقاف

Chairman of the Ansor Youth Movement
- In office 1995–1999
- Preceded by: Slamet Effendy Yusuf
- Succeeded by: Saifullah Yusuf

Chairman of the Indonesian Islamic Student Movement
- In office 1988–1991
- Preceded by: Suryadharma Ali
- Succeeded by: Ali Masykur Musa

Personal details
- Born: Muhammad Iqbal Assegaf; October 12, 1957 Labuha, Bacan Islands, South Halmahera Regency, North Maluku
- Died: February 13, 1999 (aged 41) Jakarta
- Cause of death: Car accident
- Party: Golkar Party
- Spouse: Rahma Muhammad Iqbal
- Children: 3
- Parents: Husein Ahmad Assegaf (father); Rawang Abdullah Kamarullah (mother)
- Relatives: Faizal Assegaf (cousin)
- Education: Bogor Agricultural University (1983)
- Occupation: Political activist; veterinary physician

Muhammad Iqbal Assegaf (Arabic: محمد إقبال السقاف, romanized: Muḥammad ʾIqbāl al-Saqqāf, Arabic pronunciation: [(ʔ)mʊˈħæmmæd ˈ(ʔ)iqbaːl as‿saqa:f]; October 12, 1957 – February 13, 1999) was an Indonesian political activist. Based on the results of the 9th Indonesian Islamic Student Movement congress (PMII IX congress) in Hajj Dormitory Surabaya, East Java, Iqbal was appointed as chairman of the executive board of the Indonesian Islamic Student Movement (PB PMII) period 1988–1991 replacing Suryadharma Ali. After leaving the position as Chairman of PB PMII, he was immediately appointed as chairman of the Board of Trustees PB PMII in the next period, 1991–1994.

Iqbal died on February 13, 1999, due to a car accident at the exit of the Cawang–Tanjung Priok Toll Road. At that time Iqbal drove a dark blue BMW B 63 RI with his wife, Rahma. Iqbal held the last post as Chairman of the Central Executive Board of the Ansor Youth Movement period 1995–2000. In addition, he also served as a member of the People's Representative Council of Indonesia period 1998-2003 from the Golkar Party. The two positions were never held at the end because Iqbal died first in 1999.

== Bibliography ==
- Dharma, S. Satya (2000). M. Iqbal Assegaf: Sang Aktivis [M. Iqbal Assegaf: The Activist] (in Indonesian). Jakarta: S.S. Dharma. OCLC 48222652.
- Masuhara, Ayako (2015). The End of Personal Rule in Indonesia: Golkar and the Transformation of the Suharto Regime. Washington, D.C.: Government Printing Office. ISBN 9781920901196.
- Sukma, Rizal (2004). Islam in Indonesian Foreign Policy: Domestic Weakness and the Dilemma of Dual Identity. Abingdon: Routledge. ISBN 9781134514540.
- Fatwa, Andi Mappetahang; Wakhudin (1999). Menggugat dari Balik Penjara: Surat-surat Politik A.M. Fatwa [Sue from Behind the Prison: Political Letters A.M. Fatwa] (in Indonesian). Jakarta: Teraju. p. 98. ISBN 9789793603025.
