= Suharso Monoarfa =

7th Chairman of the United Development Party

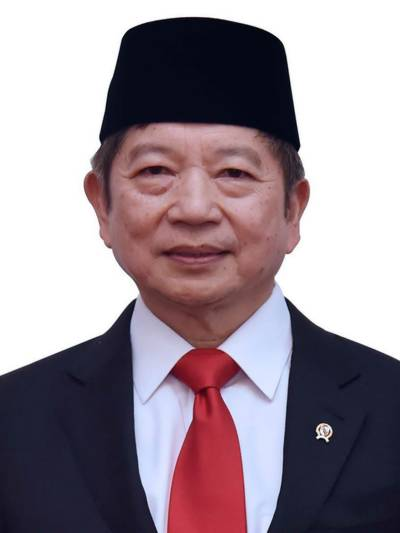
- Official portrait, 2019

Minister of National Development Planning
- In office 23 October 2019 – 20 October 2024
- President: Joko Widodo
- Preceded by: Bambang Brodjonegoro
- Succeeded by: Rachmat Pambudy

7th Chairman of the United Development Party
- In office 20 August 2019 – 5 September 2022
- Preceded by: Muhammad Romahurmuziy
- Succeeded by: Muhamad Mardiono

Member of the Presidential Advisory Council
- In office 19 January 2015 – 20 October 2019
- President: Joko Widodo
- Chairman: Sri Adiningsih

6th Minister of Housing
- In office 22 October 2009 – 19 October 2011
- President: Susilo Bambang Yudhoyono
- Preceded by: Muhammad Yusuf Asy'ari
- Succeeded by: Djan Faridz

Member of the House of Representatives
- In office 1 October 2004 – 30 September 2009
- Preceded by: Constituency established
- Succeeded by: A. W. Thalib
- Constituency: Gorontalo

Personal details
- Born: 31 October 1954 (age 71) Mataram, West Nusa Tenggara, Indonesia
- Party: United Development
- Spouse: Nurhayati Effendi (m. 2011)
- Children: Andhika; Raushanfikri

Suharso Monoarfa (born 31 October 1954) is an Indonesian entrepreneur and politician who served as Minister for National Development Planning from 2019 to 2024. He was also a member of the Presidential Advisory Council.

He served as Minister of Public Housing in the Second United Indonesia Cabinet between October 2009 and October 2011. He was also a member of the House of Representatives between 2004 and 2009 and was re-elected again in 2009. On 17 October 2011, Suharso Monoarfa resigned from his post as the Minister of Public Housing of the Republic of Indonesia, for personal reasons.

On 19 January 2015, he was elected by President Joko Widodo as one of the members of the Presidential Advisory Council.

In March 2019, he became acting chairman of the United Development Party following the arrest of Muhammad Romahurmuziy. He held this position until September 2022, when he was replaced by Muhamad Mardiono following a controversy over a statement Suharso made regarding kyai.

In 2021, after the enactment of Presidential Decree No. 78/2021, he become one of Vice Heads of National Research and Innovation Agency Steering Committee, together with Sri Mulyani.

== Honours ==
=== National ===
- Indonesia
  - Star of Mahaputera (2nd Class) (Indonesian: Bintang Mahaputera Adipradana) (14 August 2024)
