= Mahadi Sinambela =

Indonesian politician (died 2019)

Mahadi Sinambela (5 August 1947 – 1 March 2019) was an Indonesian politician who served as Minister of Youth and Sports Affairs.
