= Advanced Indonesia Coalition =

Official political coalition in Indonesia (2023–present)

Advanced Indonesia Coalition Koalisi Indonesia Maju
- Abbreviation: KIM/KIM Plus (Advanced Indonesia Coalition Plus)
- President: Prabowo Subianto
- Vice President: Gibran Rakabuming Raka
- Founder: Prabowo Subianto; Muhaimin Iskandar; Zulkifli Hasan; Airlangga Hartarto; Yusril Ihza Mahendra
- Founded: 13 August 2022; 4 years ago (as Great Indonesia Awakening Coalition); 28 August 2023; 3 years ago (as Advanced Indonesia Coalition)
- Preceded by: Onward Indonesia Coalition; Just and Prosperous Indonesia Coalition; United Indonesia Coalition
- Ideology: Pancasila; Statism; Indonesian nationalism; Factions: Jokowism Prabowoism Pancasila economics
- Political position: Big tent
- National affiliation: Government Coalition (since 2024)
- Member parties: Golkar; Gerindra; PAN; Democratic; PSI; Gelora; PBB; Garuda; KIM Plus: PKB; Perindo; NasDem; PKS; PPP; Hanura; PKN; Ummat; Labour
- Supporting parties: PRIMA; PA; PKP; Berkarya; PKR; Parsindo
- Colours: Light blue White
- Slogan: Bersama Indonesia Maju (Together Indonesia Advances); Menuju Indonesia Emas (Towards a Golden Indonesia)
- DPR RI: 470 / 580
- DPRD I: 1,932 / 2,372
- DPRD II: 14,084 / 17,510

Website
- prabowogibran2.id
- Politics of Indonesia; Political parties; Elections; A: The coalition is considered as from centre-left to left-wing, centre, centre-right, and right-wing to far-right that does have a big tent position.

The Advanced Indonesia Coalition (Indonesian: Koalisi Indonesia Maju, KIM), formerly the Great Indonesia Awakening Coalition (Indonesian: Koalisi Kebangkitan Indonesia Raya, KKIR), is an official political coalition in Indonesia which was formed through a political agreement between two parties from the Onward Indonesia Coalition, namely the Gerindra Party (Gerindra) and the National Awakening Party (PKB), to nominate Prabowo Subianto, Minister of Defence, as a presidential candidate in 2024 Indonesian presidential election. The coalition currently controls the government.

Later, in August 2023, Golkar and the National Mandate Party (PAN) joined the coalition. In September of that same year, the PKB decided to leave the coalition and join the Coalition of Change for Unity, while remaining part of the government.

== Background ==
On 13 August 2022, the Great Indonesia Movement Party (Gerindra) and the National Awakening Party (PKB) signed a declaration charter to form the Great Indonesia Awakening Coalition during the closing of Gerindra’s National Leadership Meeting. The coalition’s presidential and vice-presidential nominees would be decided jointly by both party leaders.

On 24 January 2023, Gerindra and PKB launched a Joint Secretariat.

On July–August 2023, several parties declared support for Prabowo Subianto, including the Crescent Star Party (PBB), Aceh Party, and Indonesian People's Wave Party (Gelora).

On 13 August 2023, the Golkar Party and National Mandate Party (PAN) joined the coalition, formalized by a joint agreement signed at the Proclamation Manuscript Formulation Museum.

=== Name change of the coalition ===
On 28 August 2023, Prabowo announced the coalition's new name: "Advanced Indonesia Coalition" (Koalisi Indonesia Maju). PKB Chairman Muhaimin Iskandar (Gus Imin) later said he was not informed beforehand.

=== PKB’s withdrawal from KIM, surging supports ===
On 1 September 2023, the Garuda Party declared support for Prabowo. On the same day, PKB announced its withdrawal from the coalition and aligned with the NasDem Party. They reasoned that despite assurances, Muhaimin Iskandar was not selected as Prabowo's running mate and that the name change of the coalition which now included Golkar and PAN was not being informed to the party beforehand.

On 2 September 2023, Gelora Party declared their support for Prabowo as their presidential candidate. Then on 17 September, Prabowo invited chairmans of the member parties to his private residence for a meeting. The meeting includes Democratic Party ranking members and representatives from Just and Prosperous People's Party (PRIMA) and Indonesian Solidarity Party (PSI).

On 14 September 2023, Prabowo also received support from Pro Jokowi Volunteer group (Projo). Projo chairman Budi Arie Setiadi stated that Prabowo fits the description of the next leader stated by President Joko Widodo. Projo's support however was viewed with suspicion from analysts as a tacit endorsement from Jokowi and Gibran's vice presidential nomination as the coalition was also discussing about Prabowo's running mate.

=== Demokrat joins the coalition ===
With the entrance of PKB as a new member of the Coalition of Change for Unity and the decision by Anies Baswedan to nominate Muhaimin Iskandar as his running mate, the Democratic Party (Demokrat) has decided to withdraw their support towards Anies. Demokrat afterwards opened to give their support to either Prabowo or Ganjar Pranowo, citing support to Prabowo in the past two presidential elections and support for Ganjar during the 2018 Central Java gubernatorial election.

Demokrat leaders including chairman Agus Harimurti Yudhoyono and former president Susilo Bambang Yudhoyono visited Prabowo's residence in Hambalang on 17 September 2023 with Prabowo's invitation. Then, the Democratic Party, through its Chairman Agus Harimurti Yudhoyono and Chief of the Party’s Higher Council Susilo Bambang Yudhoyono, officially declared support for Prabowo after withdrawing from the Coalition for Change. The Democratic Party then solidifies their choice of supporting Prabowo after holding a party convention on 21 September 2023.

=== Nomination of Gibran as running mate ===
On 13 September 2023, Prabowo announced that he has 4 vice presidential candidates to consider after broad discussion with coalition members. When asked, Prabowo only gave the regions where the four candidates are from, which are West Java, Central Java, East Java and outside of Java. Fahri Hamzah hinted that one of the candidates is a woman. Prabowo later announced that the coalition will again meet to decide his running mate. Based on Prabowo's hints, many speculated that these vice presidential candidates were Erick Thohir, Khofifah Indar Parawansa, Gibran Rakabuming Raka and Yusril Ihza Mahendra. PAN has earlier declared for Thohir as their vice presidential candidate, while Golkar picked their chairman Airlangga Hartarto to be Prabowo's running mate.

After Demokrat joined the coalition, many speculated that Agus Harimurti Yudhoyono will also be a potential running mate for Prabowo due to him being formerly considered as a running mate by Anies Baswedan prior to their withdrawal of support. However, Demokrat assured the coalition that they will respect the choices of those who joined prior and will focus on getting Prabowo to win. Yudhoyono himself stated that he named Khofifah as their vice presidential nominee instead.

On 26 September 2023, PBB proposed Gibran Rakabuming Raka, Mayor of Surakarta and son of President Joko Widodo, as Prabowo’s running mate, despite age limitations in the electoral law. On 16 October 2023, the Constitutional Court ruled that a candidate under 40 could run if they have been elected to public office. This led to Golkar's endorsement to Gibran's candidacy despite previously named their chairman Airlangga Hartarto as Prabowo's running mate on 21 October. Gibran also visited Demokrat chairman Agus Harimurti Yudhoyono to seek support. While Demokrat politicians stated that they will likely give support, former president Susilo Bambang Yudhoyono tweeted that they will await Prabowo's final decision.

On 22 October 2023, Prabowo officially announced Gibran as his running mate, following unanimous support from coalition parties. On 24 October 2023, the Indonesian Solidarity Party (PSI) became the final party to join the coalition.

On 25 October 2023, the Prabowo–Gibran pair officially registered with the General Elections Commission (KPU).

== History ==
On August 12, 2022, the Gerindra Party re-declared Prabowo Subianto as a Presidential Candidate in the upcoming 2024 Presidential Election. Then on August 13, 2022, Prabowo Subianto as the General Chairperson of Gerindra together with Muhaimin Iskandar as the General Chairperson of PKB formed a coalition called the "Indonesia Raya Awakening Coalition".

On July 30, 2023, Crescent Star Party declared its support for Prabowo Subianto to run in the 2024 presidential election. This action was followed by Aceh Party which declared its support for Prabowo Subianto to run in the 2024 presidential election on August 5, 2023.

On August 13, 2023, Golkar Party and National Mandate Party from United Indonesia Coalition declared their joining the Great Indonesia Awakening Coalition, the cooperation charter was signed at the Proclamation Manuscript Formulation Museum attended by 4 general chairmen of the coalition members.

On August 28, 2023, Prabowo Subianto announced the name change of the Great Indonesia Awakening Coalition to the Advanced Indonesia Coalition, similar to the name of the coalition supporting President Joko Widodo in the 2019 Presidential Election. Meanwhile, PKB felt that KKIR had been disbanded.

Afterwards, on September 1, 2023, Garuda Party declared and stated its support for Prabowo as a presidential candidate without conditions in the 2024 Presidential Election. Meanwhile, on September 2, 2023, PKB chose to leave KIM and join NasDem Party to support Anies Baswedan as a presidential candidate in the 2024 Presidential Election.

On September 2, 2023, Gelora Party stated its support for Prabowo as a presidential candidate in the 2024 Presidential Election; and on September 17, 2023, Prabowo Subianto invited the general chairmen of the coalition member parties to have lunch together, the meeting was attended by the general chairmen and representatives of the Indonesian Solidarity Party (PSI), the Garuda Party, and the Just and Prosperous People's Party (PRIMA). Also present were the general chairmen and the chairman of the High Council of the Democratic Party who had just withdrawn their support from Anies Baswedan.

On September 21, 2023, the Democratic Party officially declared its support for Prabowo and joined the KIM. Five days later, the name of the Mayor of Solo who is also the son of President Joko Widodo, Gibran Rakabuming Raka, was rumored as a vice presidential candidate. Gibran stated that he was only 36 years old and not old enough, according to Election Law Number 7 of 2017 presidential or vice presidential candidates must be 40 years old. On October 16, 2023, the Constitutional Court rejected the change in the age limit for presidential and vice presidential candidates to 35 years, but granted a lawsuit allowing regional heads who had been elected through regional elections to run as presidential and vice presidential candidates even though they were not yet 40 years old.

The Golkar Party then officially nominated Gibran as Prabowo Subianto's vice presidential candidate in the 2024 presidential election. Gibran met with the general chairmen of the KIM members. Prabowo then announced that all KIM member parties accepted Gibran's name as his vice presidential candidate.

On October 24, 2023, the PSI declared its support for the Prabowo-Gibran pair in the 2024 presidential election. After receiving a lot of support, Prabowo-Gibran registered themselves with the General Elections Commission (KPU).

== Member parties ==
Name		Ideology	Position	Leader(s)	2024 result	
Name		Ideology	Position	Leader(s)	Votes (%)	Seats
National party / members of DPR
Golkar	Party of Functional Groups; Partai Golongan Karya	National conservatism	Centre-right to right-wing	Bahlil Lahadalia	15.29%	102 / 580
Gerindra	Great Indonesia Movement Party; Partai Gerakan Indonesia Raya	Right-wing populism	Right-wing to far-right	Prabowo Subianto	13.22%	86 / 580
PKB	National Awakening Party; Partai Kebangkitan Bangsa	Islamic democracy	Centre	Muhaimin Iskandar	10.62%	68 / 580
PAN	National Mandate Party; Partai Amanat Nasional	Religious nationalism	Centre to centre-right	Zulkifli Hasan	7.24%	48 / 580
Demokrat	Democratic Party; Partai Demokrat	Constitutionalism	Centre to centre-right	Agus Harimurti Yudhoyono	7.43%	44 / 580
National party / non-members of DPR
PSI	Indonesian Solidarity Party; Partai Solidaritas Indonesia	Social democracy	Centre-left	Kaesang Pangarep	2.81%	0 / 580
Perindo	Indonesian Unity Party; Partai Persatuan Indonesia	Populism	Centre-right	Angela Tanoesoedibjo	1.29%	0 / 580
Gelora	Indonesian People's Wave Party; Partai Gelombang Rakyat Indonesia	Islamic democracy	Centre to centre-right	Anis Matta	0.84%	0 / 580
PBB	Crescent Star Party; Partai Bulan Bintang	Islamic democracy	Right-wing	Fahri Bachmid	0.32%	0 / 580
National party / unqualified for 2024 election
PRIMA	Just and Prosperous People's Party; Partai Rakyat Adil Makmur	Left-wing populism	Centre-left to left-wing	Agus Jabo Priyono	—N/a	—N/a
PKP	Justice and Unity Party; Partai Keadilan dan Persatuan	Secularism	Centre	Yussuf Solichien	—N/a	—N/a
Aceh regional party
PA	Aceh Party; Partai Aceh	Aceh regionalism	Right-wing	Muzakir Manaf	TBD	20 / 81 (seats at DPRA)

== General election results ==
Election	Seats			Total votes	Share of votes	Outcome of election
Election	No.	%	±	Total votes	Share of votes	Outcome of election
2024	280 / 580	48.27%	▲19 (2019 result)	71,981,004	47.42%	Governing coalition

== Post-election ==
The four parties in the coalition which qualified for the House of Representatives failed to win a majority of seats. After the election results were announced, the NasDem Party and the National Awakening Party which supported Anies Baswedan as part of the Coalition of Change for Unity voiced their interest in joining the government coalition.

In the leadup to the 2024 Indonesian local elections, the coalition further expanded in August 2024 to include the Prosperous Justice Party, the United Development Party, and the Perindo Party, leaving just the Indonesian Democratic Party of Struggle outside of the coalition. It was also renamed as the Advanced Indonesia Coalition Plus (Indonesian: Koalisi Indonesia Maju Plus). Such coalition had formed up in numerous local elections such as in Jakarta, Central Java, and North Sumatra but the national coalition were divided in their preference in places such as Banten, West Java and East Java. The difference in preference however did not affect the relations of parties in the national level as Sufmi Dasco Ahmad said that Prabowo allowed all member parties to choose their own preferential candidates. Prabowo himself understands that difference of preference on the local elections are unavoidable.

There was also calls to make the Advanced Indonesia Coalition to be a permanent political alliance. On 14 February 2024, PSI politician Jeffrie Geovannie called for a coalition similar to Barisan Nasional. In a February 2025 meeting, Prabowo explicitly requested the commitment of membering parties to unity until the next election.

== See also ==
- Prabowo Subianto 2024 presidential campaign
