= Djan Faridz =

Indonesian politician

Ir. H. Djan Faridz
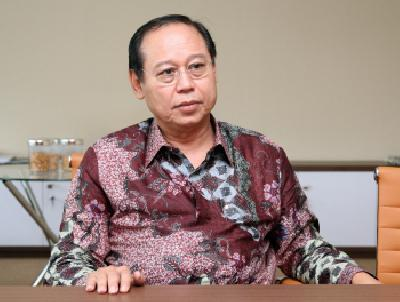

Minister of Public Housing
- In office 19 October 2011 – 20 October 2014
- Preceded by: Suharso Monoarfa
- Succeeded by: Basuki Hadimuljono

Personal details
- Born: 5 August 1950 (age 76) Jakarta, Indonesia
- Party: United Development Party
- Education: Tarumanegara University
- Profession: Businessman, politician
- Website: www.djanfaridz.com/

Djan Faridz (born 5 August 1950) is an Indonesian businessman, a former Minister of Public Housing, and owner of PT Dizamatra Powerindo.

== Biography ==
Faridz was born in Jakarta on 5 August 1950 to Mohammad and Aisha Djan. He attended St. Fransiskus Elementary School from 1957 to 1963, then Kanisius Junior High School from 1963 to 1966 and State Senior High School 2 Jakarta from 1966 to 1969. He then attended Tarumanagara University, where he graduated with a degree in architecture.

Faridz's first business was a welder's stall, which eventually began selling building materials. In 1996 Faridz founded PT Dizamatra Powerindo, a private contractor that has been used by Pertamina. He has also been involved with property speculation, and was once member of the Young Entrepreneurs' Association

In 2004 Faridz became involved with the Muslim organization Nahdlatul Ulama, becoming the Jakarta branch's treasurer by 2009.

In 2009, Faridz was elected as a representative of Jakarta at the Regional Representative Council with a total of 200,000 votes, placing third overall. He received most of his support from Nahdlatul Ulama and businessment. As a representative, he focused on preserving Betawi culture and increasing Jakarta's economic capabilities, with a focus on the traditional markets.

On 17 October 2011, he was chosen as the new Minister of Public Housing, which led to his withdrawing a bid to run for Governor of Jakarta. Also in 2011 he was chosen to lead the Jakarta chapter of Nahdlatul Ulama until 2014.

== Controversy ==
In 2000 the Indonesia Corruption Watch reported that Faridz had received non-transparent grants to fund power substations. In 2004 Faridz led the renovation of the textile market at Tanah Abang, which raised controversy. He is known to have good relations with politicians and military figures, including President Susilo Bambang Yudhoyono.

== Personal life ==
Faridz is married to Nini Widjaja. Together they live in Menteng. The couple has seven children.
