= United Development Party =

Political party in Indonesia

United Development Party Partai Persatuan Pembangunan
- Abbreviation: PPP/P3
- General Chairman: Muhamad Mardiono
- Secretary-General: Taj Yasin Maimoen
- Founders: Mohammad Syafaat Mintaredja; Idham Chalid; Anwar Tjokroaminoto; Rusli Halil; Masjkur
- Founded: 5 January 1973; 53 years ago
- Merger of: Nahdlatul Ulama; Parmusi; Indonesian Islamic Union Party; Islamic Education Movement
- Headquarters: Jl. Pangeran Diponegoro No. 60 Kel. Menteng, Kec. Menteng, Central Jakarta, Jakarta 10310
- Youth wing: Kaaba Youth Movement; Young Generation of Indonesian Development
- Women's wing: Woman of United Development
- Membership (2022): 444,496
- Ideology: Pancasila; Islamism; Pan-Islamism Islamic traditionalism (Indonesia); Religious conservatism; Economic liberalism; Faction: Religious pluralism
- Political position: Right-wing; Faction: Centre-right
- National affiliation: Advanced Indonesia Coalition (2024–present) Former: Alliance of Parties (2023–2024) United Indonesia Coalition (2022–2023) Onward Indonesia Coalition (2018–2022) Great Indonesia Coalition (2014–2018) Red-White Coalition (2014) Joint Secretariat (2009–2014) People's Coalition (2004–2009) National Coalition (2004) Central Axis (1999–2004)
- Slogan: Bergerak Bersama Rakyat (Moving with the People)
- Anthem: Mars PPP (PPP March)
- Ballot number: 17
- DPR: 0 / 580
- DPRD I: 83 / 2,372
- DPRD II: 850 / 17,510

Website
- ppp.or.id

The United Development Party (Indonesian: Partai Persatuan Pembangunan, PPP or P3), is one of the Islamist political parties in Indonesia. At the time of its declaration on January 5, 1973, this party was the result of a merger of four religious parties, namely the Nahdlatul Ulama Party (NU), the Islamic Education Movement (PERTI), the Indonesian Islamic Union Party (PSII), and the Indonesian Muslims' Party (PARMUSI). The first chairman at that time was Mohammad Syafaat Mintaredja. The merger of the four religious parties was aimed at simplifying the party system in Indonesia in facing the first general election during the New Order in 1973. Because the party's distinctive logo was associated with Islamic religious politics, the PPP was popularly known as the Kaaba Party.

== History ==
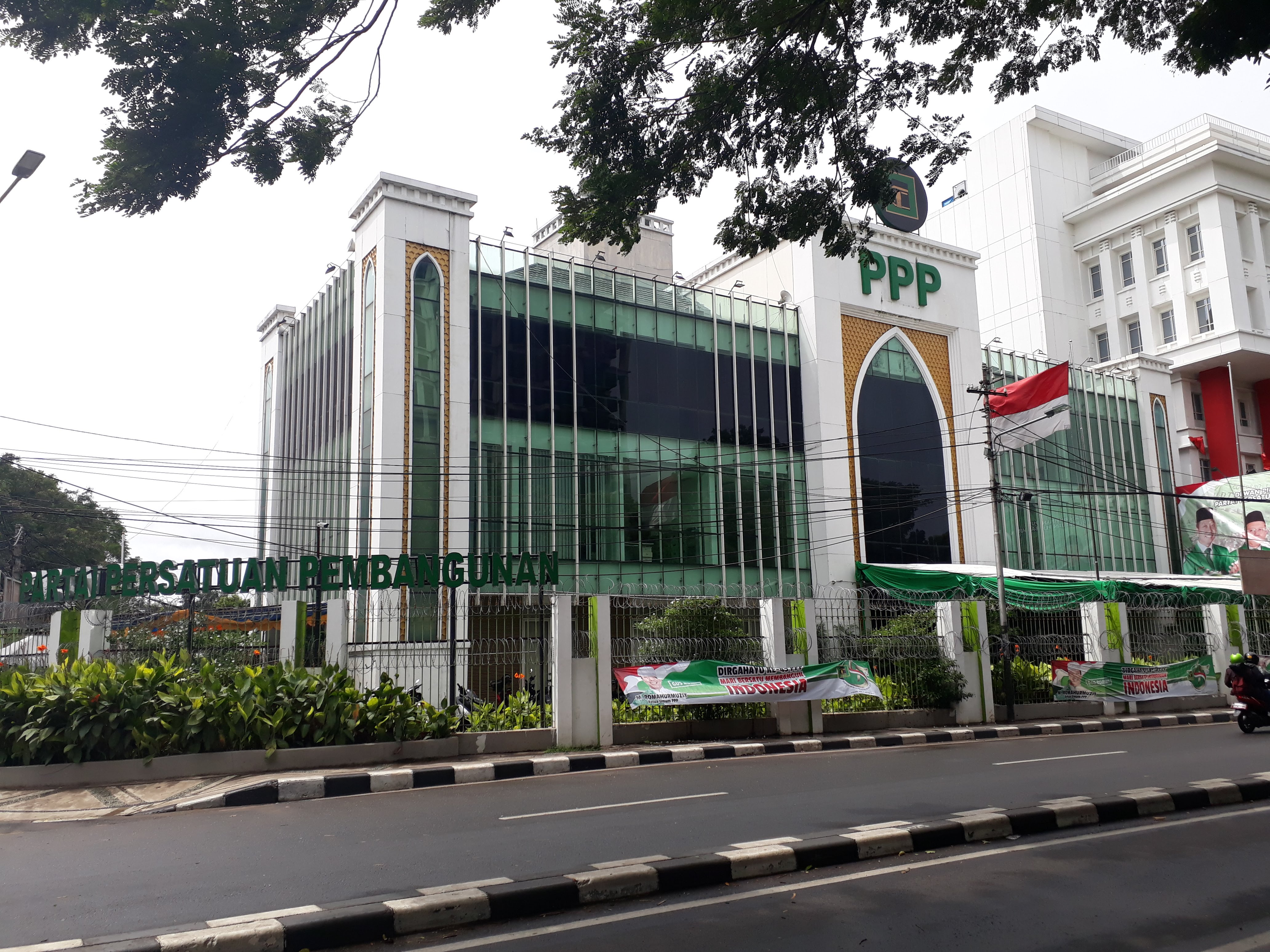
Party head office on Jalan Diponegoro, Menteng, Jakarta

=== Origins ===
Ten political parties participated in the 1971 legislative election, a number that President Suharto considered to be too many. Suharto wished that political parties be reduced to just two or three and that the parties should be grouped based on their programs.

The basis for the merger that would result in the birth of the PPP was a coalition of the four Islamic Parties in the People's Representative Council (DPR) called the United Development Faction. This faction consisted of Nahdatul Ulama (NU), the Indonesian Muslims' Party (PARMUSI), the Indonesian Islamic Union Party (PSII) and the Islamic Education Movement (PERTI).

The United Development Party (PPP) was founded by

- Mohammad Syafaat Mintaredja, Chairman of the Indonesian Muslims' Party (PARMUSI)
- Idham Chalid, Chairman of Nahdlatul Ulama (NU)
- Anwar Tjokroaminoto, Chairman of the Indonesian Islamic Union Party (PSII)
- Rusli Halil, Chairman of the Islamic Education Movement (PERTI)
- Masjkur, Chairman of the United Development in the House of Representatives (DPR) faction.

The leaders of four Islamic parties participating in the 1971 election and the head of the United Development Group, a faction of the four Islamic parties in the House of Representatives (Indonesia) (DPR).

With encouragement by the Government, officials from all four parties had meetings with each other and after finding some common ground, merged the four Islamic parties in Indonesia into the United Development Party on 5 January 1973. Despite this formal merging of the parties however, internal PPP politics under the Suharto government were dominated by the differing priorities of the original groups that formed the party.

=== Opposition to the New Order ===
The party's logo from 1973 to 1985

The party's logo from 1982 to 1998

The party's logo from 1998 to 2021 and 2023 to present

In the mid-1970s, popular support for Suharto's regime was rapidly waning. When Suharto had seized power with a bloody military coup in 1965 and ousted President Sukarno, the Islamic groups had supported Suharto and aided in persecuting his political opponents. But as the regime had become corrupt and even more authoritarian, this alliance began to crumble. As the 1977 legislative election approached, many began to seek other options to vote for aside from the government-backed Golkar.

Worried that the PPP might win the elections, Suharto played on the fears of the people by having the military arrest a group of people who claimed to be associated with the Jihad Commando (Komando Jihad). With this some people became worried that to vote for the PPP and its Islamic leaning would mean expressing support the Jihad Commando and in a government growing increasingly authoritarian, many simply refused to be associated with the wrong side. Golkar would go on to win the legislative elections with 62% with the PPP coming second with 27% of the votes.

The PPP however, would not sit back and accept defeat. At the 1978 MPR General Session, PPP member Chalid Mawardi launched a scathing criticism of Suharto's regime. Mawardi accused the Government of being anti-Muslim, complained about the government's violent crackdown of dissent, and alleged that the 1977 legislative election was won because of electoral fraud. PPP members also conducted a mass walkout when Suharto referred to religions as "streams of beliefs".

The PPP seemed to have cemented itself a status as the strongest opposition party. It would not last long however. In 1984, NU, under its chairman, Abdurrahman Wahid withdrew from the PPP, severely weakening it. The PPP vote share fell from almost 28% in the 1982 legislative election to 16% in the 1987 legislative election, the PPP was also forced by the government to replace its ideology of Islam with the national ideology of Pancasila and to stop using Islamic symbols. As a result, the party replaced its logo showing the Kabah shrine in Mecca with a star. The symbol was identical to the first principle of Pancasila, Ketuhanan yang Maha Esa (Belief in the One Supreme God).

=== 1988 MPR general session ===
At the 1988 MPR General Session, Jailani Naro, the PPP Chairman, was nominated as vice president. Suharto, who had been elected to the presidency for a fifth term at the aforementioned General Session, intervened. He cited a decision that the MPR made in 1973 that one of the criteria for a vice president was that he should be able to work with the president. Suharto also conducted discussions with Naro and convinced him to withdraw the nomination.

What Naro did was unprecedented as both Suharto and his vice presidents had always been elected unopposed. The problem this time was Suharto's choice for vice president, Sudharmono. Suharto's choice had caused a rift between him and his most loyal ally, ABRI. Many within ABRI did not like Sudharmono because he spent more time behind a desk (Sudharmono was a military attorney) than as a field officer. Seeing a gap to exploit, Naro nominated himself, possibly with the private support of ABRI who, in public, had shown support for Sudharmono.

=== The PPP in the Reform era ===
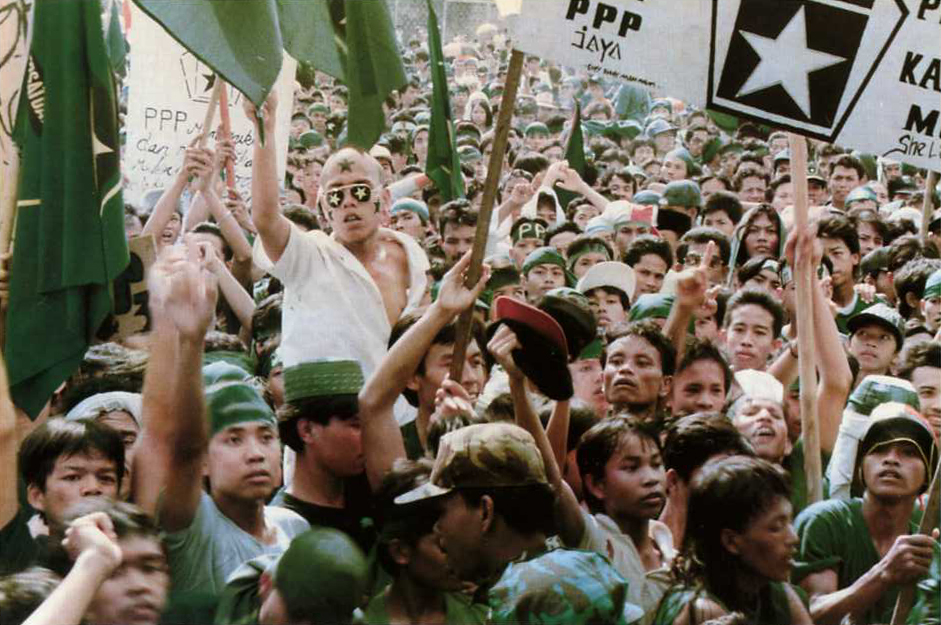
United Development Party rally in Jakarta, 24 April 1997

Party logo used briefly from 2021 to 2023

The PPP continued as the second biggest party out of the three allowed in the New Order. In May 1998, after Suharto's fall, the PPP returned to its Islamic ideology and prepared itself for the 1999 legislative election, where it won 11% of the vote.

In the 1999 MPR General Session, the PPP was part of the Central Axis, a political coalition of Muslim parties which was formed by MPR Chairman, Amien Rais to counter the dominance of Megawati Sukarnoputri's Indonesian Democratic Party-Struggle (PDI-P). The PDI-P had won the legislative election and Megawati was expected to win the presidency. However, the MPR was still at this stage responsible for electing the president and vice president, and the Muslim parties in the Central Axis did not want a female president. Instead, they nominated and successfully secured the election of Abdurrahman Wahid as president. In the vice-presidential election, PPP Chairman Hamzah Haz ran against Megawati and was defeated.

The PPP was the first of Wahid's political allies to become disillusioned with him. The PPP's main problem with Wahid was his visit to Israel and the suggestion that he was willing to establish diplomatic relations with that nation. Hamzah who served in Wahid's cabinet as Coordinating Minister for People's Welfare, immediately resigned from his position just a month after Wahid had appointed him to it. Many other Wahid allies would follow and in July 2001, the PPP would join in removing Wahid from the presidency and naming Megawati as the president. Hamzah was then elected as vice president after defeating Susilo Bambang Yudhoyono and Akbar Tanjung in the vice-presidential election.

=== 2004 legislative election ===
The PPP won 8.1% of the vote in the 2004 legislative election, a decrease from its 10.7% share of the vote in 1999, but enough to retain its place as the third-best represented party in the legislature, behind the PDI-P and Golkar.

=== 2004 presidential election ===
The PPP originally did not have a presidential candidate in mind for the 2004 presidential election. They had expected that Hamzah would be picked as Megawati's running mate and continue the Megawati/Hamzah President/Vice President partnership. Megawati however, chose NU Chairman Hasyim Muzadi as her running mate.

The PPP then continued to wait, still expecting that Hamzah Haz would be picked as a vice-presidential candidate. Finally, a day before the registration of presidential/vice-presidential candidates was closed, Hamzah moved forward and became the PPP's presidential candidate. His running mate was Agum Gumelar, who served as Minister of Transportation in Megawati's Cabinet. Hamzah's presidential run was unsuccessful as he received only 3.1% of the vote and came fifth.

In August 2004, the PPP announced that it was forming a national coalition with the PDI-P, Golkar, the Reform Star Party (PBR) and the Prosperous Peace Party to back Megawati to win the presidential run-off against Susilo Bambang Yudhoyono. Yudhoyono however would emerge victorious and the PPP would defect from the national coalition to Yudhoyono's camp. They were rewarded by being given cabinet places.

=== 2007 party congress ===
The PPP held its 6th National Congress in Jakarta from 30 January to 3 February 2007. On the last day of the Congress, Suryadharma Ali emerged as the new PPP Chairman to replace Hamzah. Suryadharma served as Minister of Cooperatives and State and Medium Enterprises in President Yudhoyono's Cabinet. He announced that he would continue as minister while concurrently holding the position of PPP Chairman.

=== 2009 legislative election ===
The party came sixth in the 2009 legislative election with 5.3 percent of the vote, winning 38 seats in the People's Representative Council. Throughout the election, the party obtained votes from the elderly Muslim men throughout rural and urban area, inside and outside of Java.

=== The party in the 2010s ===
In the 2014 Indonesian legislative election, the PPP improved on its performance in the previous election winning 6.53% of the vote, and 39 seats in the legislature. Five years later, in the 2019 Indonesian legislative election, the PPP share of the vote fell to 4.52%, and the number of seats it held in the legislature halved to 19.

=== 2014 General Election & Party Rift ===
In the 2014 Indonesian legislative election, the PPP targeted 12% of the national vote or 13-15% of the vote in the DPR. However, PPP could only win 6.53% of the national vote and 39 seats in the DPR. Internal conflict in determining the presidential candidate occurred again ahead of the 2014 presidential election. At that time, the General Chairman of the PPP Suryadharma Ali was present at the Gerindra Party campaign at the Gelora Bung Karno Stadium, Jakarta, on March 23, 2014. Suryadharma Ali gave a speech and supported Prabowo Subianto. The presence of Suryadharma Ali at the Gerindra Party campaign was accused of being the cause of the PPP's failure to achieve the target of 12 percent of the vote in the legislative elections on April 9, 2014. On April 13, 2014, 26 of the 34 PPP Regional Leadership Councils (DPW) requested that the PPP Central Leadership Council hold a plenary meeting to hear Suryadharma Ali's accountability.

Not long after the demand for accountability was voiced, Suryadharma Ali on April 16, 2014, signed a letter of dismissal for the Deputy Chairman of the PPP Suharso Monoarfa and five elements of the PPP DPW leadership. Suharso was dismissed on the grounds of managing his wife's nomination process as a legislative candidate, while the five elements of the PPP DPP leadership were dismissed for managing the presidential election while cadres were fighting for votes in the legislative elections. After the dismissal, Suryadharma declared his support for Prabowo at the PPP DPP office and was responded to by the Deputy Chairman of the PPP DPP Emron Pangkapi who emphasized that his party's coalition with Gerindra was illegal. To resolve the problem, the PPP held a national leadership meeting on April 19–20, 2014 which resulted in the decision to temporarily dismiss Suryadharma Ali as chairman. However, in the end, the internal conflict ended peacefully after Suryadharma apologized and the PPP officially supported Prabowo Subianto on May 12, 2014. The PPP had proposed Suryadharma Ali as a vice presidential candidate Prabowo but Prabowo chose Hatta Rajasa as his vice president.

=== Brief Conflict & the 2024 Election ===
Following the conflict between the Djan Faridz and Romahurmuziy camps, internal party conflict has resurfaced. This started on August 15, 2022, where Suharso Monoarfa made a controversial statement regarding the kiai's 'envelope'. Although Suharso Monoarfa has apologized, this statement is considered controversial because it is considered insulting to Islamic boarding schools and kiai, resulting in protests demanding Suharso Monoarfa to resign as the general chairman of the PPP. This controversial statement was also opposed by PPP cadres because it was considered to threaten the party's existence for the 2024 election contest and PPP cadres demanded that Suharso Monoarfa resign if he did not want to be dishonorably discharged. On September 3–5, 2022, PPP held a national working conference (Mukernas) in Serang, Banten which determined the dismissal of Suharso Monoarfa as general chairman and the appointment of Muhammad Mardiono as acting general chairman for the remainder of the 2020–2025 term. Suharso Monoarfa actually fought back against the decision and mobilized loyalist cadres to cancel the decision. Political experts assess This conflict is different because the previous conflict was related to political direction while the conflict between Suharso Monoarfa and Muhammad Mardiono occurred because of a slip of the tongue and assessed that this conflict would only last a short time.

Ahead of the 2024 elections, the United Development Party (PPP) formed the United Indonesia Coalition (KIB) together with Golkar and the National Mandate Party (PAN) on May 12, 2022. The word "Bersatu" has a philosophy, namely Beringin (Golkar), Surya (PAN), and Baitullah (PPP), while the three are symbols of each political party that founded the coalition. PPP is also strengthened by the joining of Sandiaga Uno as a party member. However, on April 26, 2023, PPP nominated Ganjar Pranowo, joining the coalition supporting PDI-P. Initially, PPP nominated Sandiaga Uno as a vice presidential candidate to accompany Ganjar and tried to invite the United Indonesia Coalition to support Ganjar Pranowo. However, Golkar and PAN supported Prabowo Subianto and formed Indonesia Onward Coalition with Great Indonesia Movement Party.

== Political identities ==
=== Ideology ===
After the fall of Suharto, PPP once again became an Islamist party in the early Post-Suharto era. Today it is considered a centre-right to right-wing nationalist Islamist party which conforms with Pancasila doctrine and no longer upholds sharia as a main goal.

=== Party platform ===
The party's vision is to bring about a nation that is just, prosperous, moral and democratic and that upholds the law, respects human rights and that holds in high esteem the dignity of mankind and social justice based on the values of Islam. The party believes that religion (Islam) has an important role to play as a moral guidance and inspiration in the life of the nation. It is committed to improving the quality of democracy in Indonesia and respects freedom of expression, opinion and organization, the realization of good governance and the endeavor to preserve the unitary Republic of Indonesia based on Pancasila and the 1945 Constitution. It supports the concept of a people-based economic system, economic justice, the creation of jobs, the eradication of poverty, state control of sectors of the economy that have a controlling influence on the lives of the majority, a major role for state-owned companies, and economic independence.

== Structure ==
The founder of the United Development Party (PPP), or P3, Mohammad Syafa'at Mintaredja, also served as its first Chairman from January 5, 1973, to February 13, 1978. In addition to the Chairman position, at the time of its inception, the Kaaba Party as it was also known featured a Party Presidium, which included Idham Chalid as Party President, along with Mohammad Syafa'at Mintaredja, Thayeb Mohammad Gobel, Rusli Halil, and Masjkur, who each served as a Party Vice President.

Leadership of United Development Party as October 2025:

Position	Name
Chairman	Muhamad Mardiono
Vice Chairman	Agus Suparmanto
Secretary-General	Taj Yasin Maimoen
Vice Secretary-General	Jabbar Idris
General Treasurer	Imam Fauzan Amir Uskara
Vice General Treasurer	Rusman Ya'qub

== Election results ==
=== Legislative election results ===
Election	Ballot number	Leader	Seats		Total votes	Share of votes	Outcome of election
Election	Ballot number	Leader	No.	±	Total votes	Share of votes	Outcome of election
1977	1	Mohammad Syafaat Mintaredja	99 / 360		18,743,491	29.29%	Governing coalition (until 1978)
1977	1	Mohammad Syafaat Mintaredja	99 / 360		18,743,491	29.29%	Opposition (from 1978)
1982	1	Jailani Naro	94 / 360	▼5	20,871,880	27.78%	Opposition
1987	1	Jailani Naro	61 / 400	▼33	13,701,428	15.97%	Opposition
1992	1	Ismail Hasan Metareum	62 / 400	▲1	16,624,647	17.01%	Opposition
1997	1	Ismail Hasan Metareum	89 / 425	▲27	25,340,028	22.43%	Opposition (until 1998)
1997	1	Ismail Hasan Metareum	89 / 425	▲27	25,340,028	22.43%	Governing coalitiom (from 1998)
1999	9	Hamzah Haz	58 / 462	▼31	11,329,905	10.71%	Governing coalition
2004	5	Hamzah Haz	58 / 550	0	9,248,764	8.15%	Governing coalition
2009	24	Suryadharma Ali	38 / 560	▼20	5,544,332	5.32%	Governing coalition
2014	9	Suryadharma Ali	39 / 560	▲1	8,157,488	6.53%	Governing coalition
2019	10	Suharso Monoarfa	19 / 575	▼20	6,323,147	4.52%	Governing coalition
2024	17	Muhamad Mardiono	0 / 580	▼19	5,878,708	3.87%	Governing coalition

=== Presidential election results ===
Election	Ballot number	Pres. candidate	Running mate	1st round (Total votes)	Share of votes	Outcome	2nd round (Total votes)	Share of votes	Outcome
2004	5	**Hamzah Haz**	Agum Gumelar	3,569,861	3.01%	Eliminated	Runoff		
2009	2	Susilo Bambang Yudhoyono	Boediono	73,874,562	60.80%	Elected			
2014	1	Prabowo Subianto	Hatta Rajasa	62,576,444	46.85%	Lost			
2019	1	Joko Widodo	Ma'ruf Amin	85,607,362	55.50%	Elected			
2024	3	Ganjar Pranowo	Mahfud MD	27,040,878	16.47%	Lost			

Note: Bold text indicates the party member

== See also ==
- List of Islamic political parties

== Famous figures in the United Development Party ==
- Mohammad Syafa'at Mintaredja — Founder and First Chairman (1973–1978)
- Hamzah Haz — Vice President of Indonesia (2001–2004)
- Maimun Zubair — Muslim Leader
- Sandiaga Uno — Minister of Tourism and Creative Economy (2020–2024)
