= Presidential Advisory Council =

Indonesian advisory council

- Dewan Pertimbangan Presiden
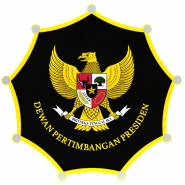

Council overview
- Formed: April 10, 2007
- Preceding Council: Supreme Advisory Council
- Headquarters: Central Jakarta, Indonesia
- Council executives: Pratikno, Chairman; Hatta Rajasa, Deputy Chairman
- Key document: Law No.9/2016
- Website: wantimpres.go.id

Presidential Advisory Council (Indonesian: Dewan Pertimbangan Presiden; abbreviated as Wantimpres) is a non-structural government agency that serves as an advisory council for the President of Indonesia. The council was formed in 2007 during the presidency of Susilo Bambang Yudhoyono, and is modelled after the former constitutional Supreme Advisory Council (Dewan Pertimbangan Agung) that was disbanded in 2003.

== Legal basis ==
Article 16 of the Constitution of Indonesia authorises the president to establish an advisory council to support its daily administration.

Indonesian Act No.19/2006 provides the legal basis for the advisory council. The law specifies the powers and authorities of the council, as well as its membership, remunerations, and working procedures.

In 2024, the legal basis was revised (Indonesian Act No.64/2024), changing the number of members from the original nine to an unlimited number, as determined by the president's needs.

== Functions ==
The main function of the advisory council is to advise the president on its daily administration. Advice to the president could be made on personal basis, or as the council in the whole. Members of the advisory council are expected to brief the president on a daily basis, whether by prior request from the president or not.

Advices given to the president are considered confidential, thus members are prohibited to publish and announce the advice that had been given to the public. Members of the advisory council are allowed to attend daily cabinet meetings and to join presidential entourage on a working or a state visit.

Members of the advisory council are supported by one secretary for each members to support their daily advisory function. Members' secretaries are subordinate to each members and have no capacity to supersede the main council members.
