= Muhammad Romahurmuziy =

Indonesian politician

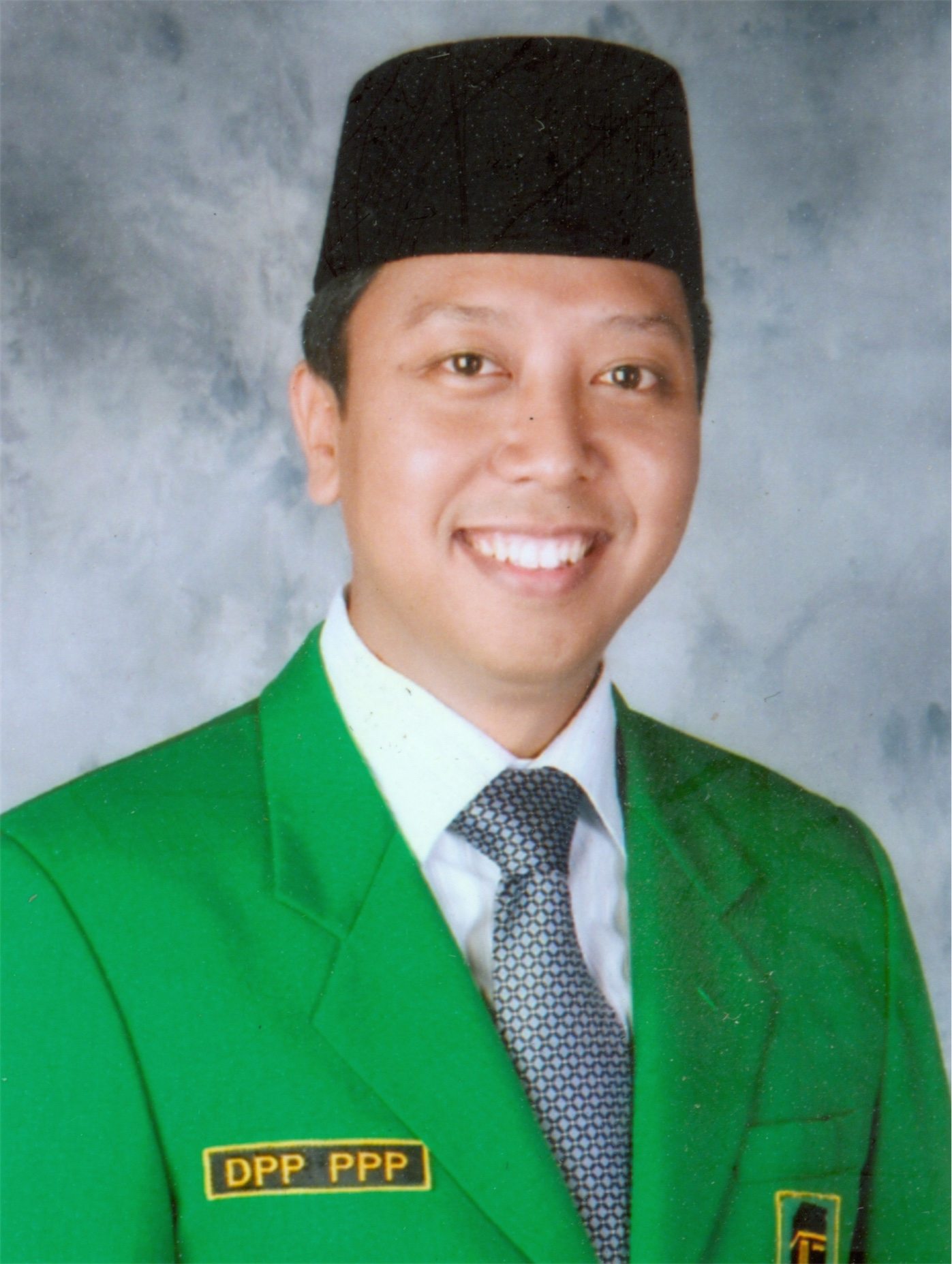
- Romahurmuziy in 2014

6th Chairman of the United Development Party
- In office 20 May 2016 – 16 March 2019
- Preceded by: Suryadharma Ali
- Succeeded by: Suharso Monoarfa

Personal details
- Born: 10 September 1974 (age 52) Sleman, Indonesia
- Party: PPP
- Spouse: Henny Widiyanti
- Children: Nurul Izzah Khairunnisa
- Education: Bandung Institute of Technology
- Occupation: politician

Muhammad Romahurmuziy (born 10 September 1974 in Sleman) is an Indonesian politician who was chairman of the United Development Party (PPP). Shortly after the beginning of Romahurmuziy's leadership, the PPP joined the ruling coalition as well as the Working Cabinet of President Joko Widodo. Under Romahurmuziy, the party participated in the November 2016 Jakarta protests against Jakarta governor Basuki Tjahaja Purnama despite President Widodo's view that the protests were a "waste of time." Despite their diverging views on the protests, Romahurmuziy claimed that they didn't signal a split in the ruling coalition, and that the presence of the PPP would assure protesters that the blasphemy case against Purnama would be fair and transparent.
