= List of ministers of investment and downstream industry (Indonesia) =

Minister of Investment and Downstream Industry
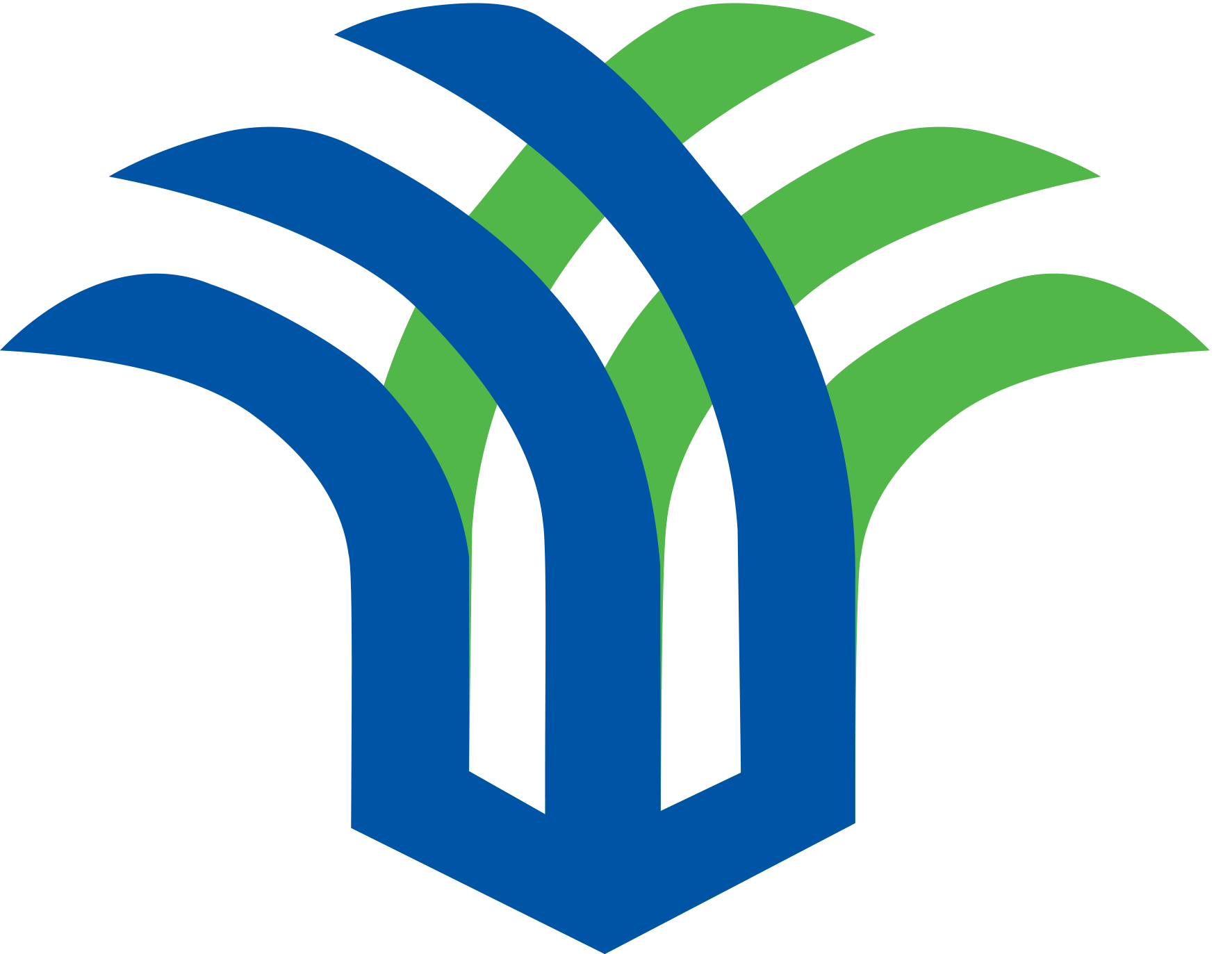

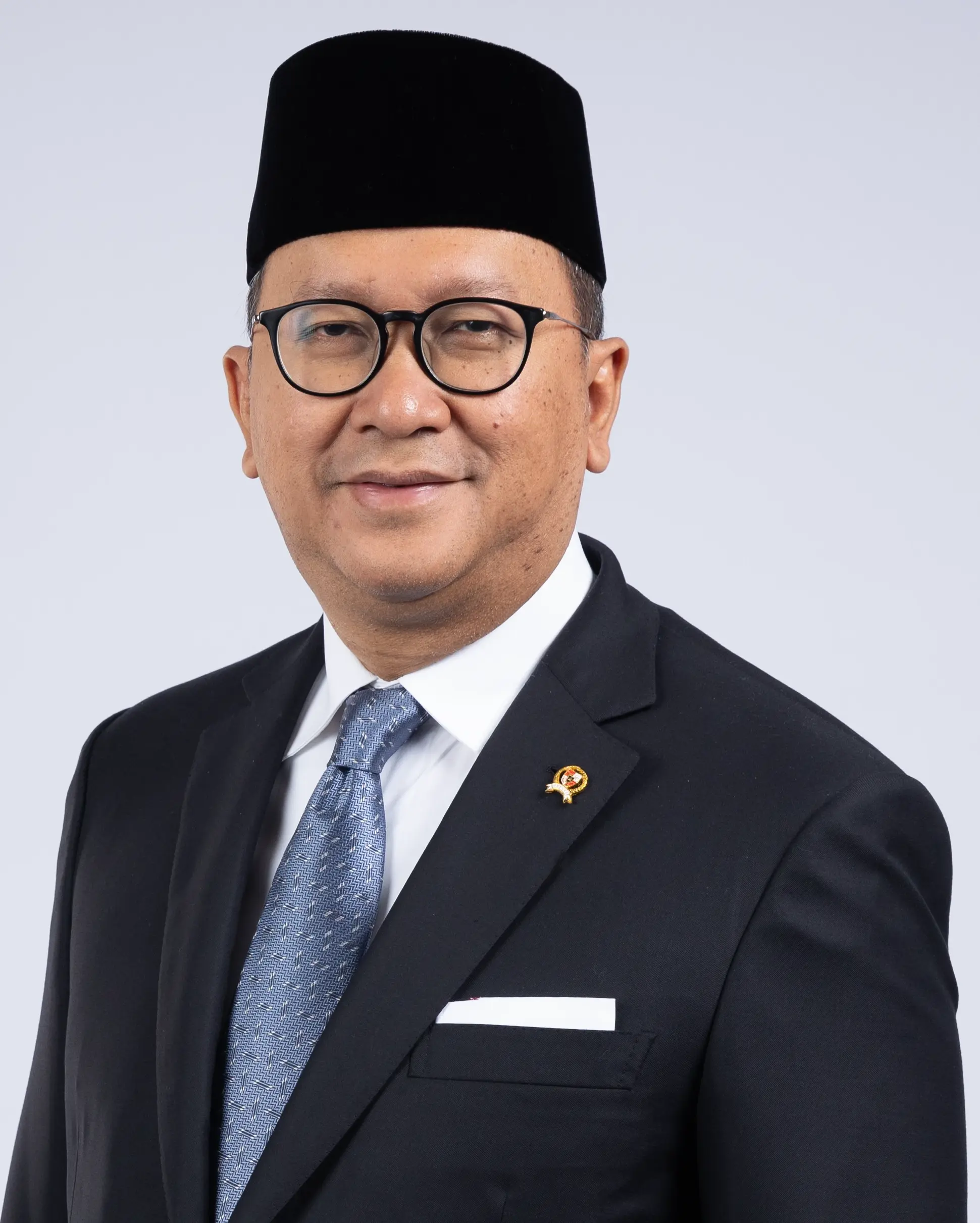
- Incumbent; Rosan Roeslani since 19 August 2024
- Appointer: President of Indonesia
- Inaugural holder: Sanyoto Sastrowardoyo
- Formation: 17 March 1993; 33 years ago
- Website: investindonesia.go.id

The following is a list of the Minister of Investment and Downstream Industry.

No.	Minister	Political party	Cabinet	Took office	Left office	Note
1	Sanyoto Sastrowardoyo	Golkar	Development VI	17 March 1993	14 March 1998	(Note: As State Ministers of Investment) (Note: Concurrent as Head of Investment Coordinating Board)
1	Sanyoto Sastrowardoyo	Golkar	Development VII	16 March 1998	23 May 1998	(Note: As State Ministers of Investment) (Note: Concurrent as Head of Investment Coordinating Board)
2	Hamzah Haz	United Development	Development Reform	23 May 1998	18 May 1999	
3	Marzuki Usman	Independent	Development Reform	18 May 1999	27 September 1999	
–	Muhammad Zuhal (ad-interim)	Independent	Development Reform	1 October 1999	20 October 1999	
4	Laksamana Sukardi	PDIP	National Unity	26 Oktober 1999	26 April 2000	(Note: As State Minister of Investment and Development of State-Owned Enterprises)
5	Rozy Munir	National Awakening	National Unity	26 April 2000	23 Agustus 2000	
Office abolished from 23 August 2000 until 28 April 2021
6	Bahlil Lahadalia	Independent	Onward Indonesia	28 April 2021	19 August 2024	(Note: As Ministers of Investment)
7	Rosan Roeslani	Independent	Onward Indonesia	19 August 2024	20 October 2024	(Note: As Ministers of Investment and Downstream Industry)
7	Rosan Roeslani	Independent	Red and White	21 October 2024	Incumbent	(Note: As Ministers of Investment and Downstream Industry)

Name of minister
