= Sudirman (disambiguation) =

Sudirman was an Indonesian army general.

Sudirman may also refer to:

- Sudirman (footballer, born 1969)
- Sudirman (horse)
- Sudirman Cup, a badminton championship
- Sudirman railway station, a commuter rail station in Jakarta
- Sudirman Range, a mountain range in Papua
- Jalan Jenderal Sudirman, often shortened to Sudirman, a major north–south arterial road in Jakarta

== People with the surname ==
- Sudirman Arshad, Malaysian singer
- Dick Sudirman (1922–1986), Indonesian badminton player
- Sudirman Said (born 1963), 15th Minister of Energy and Mineral Resources of Indonesia
