= Arsjad Rasjid =

Indonesian businessman

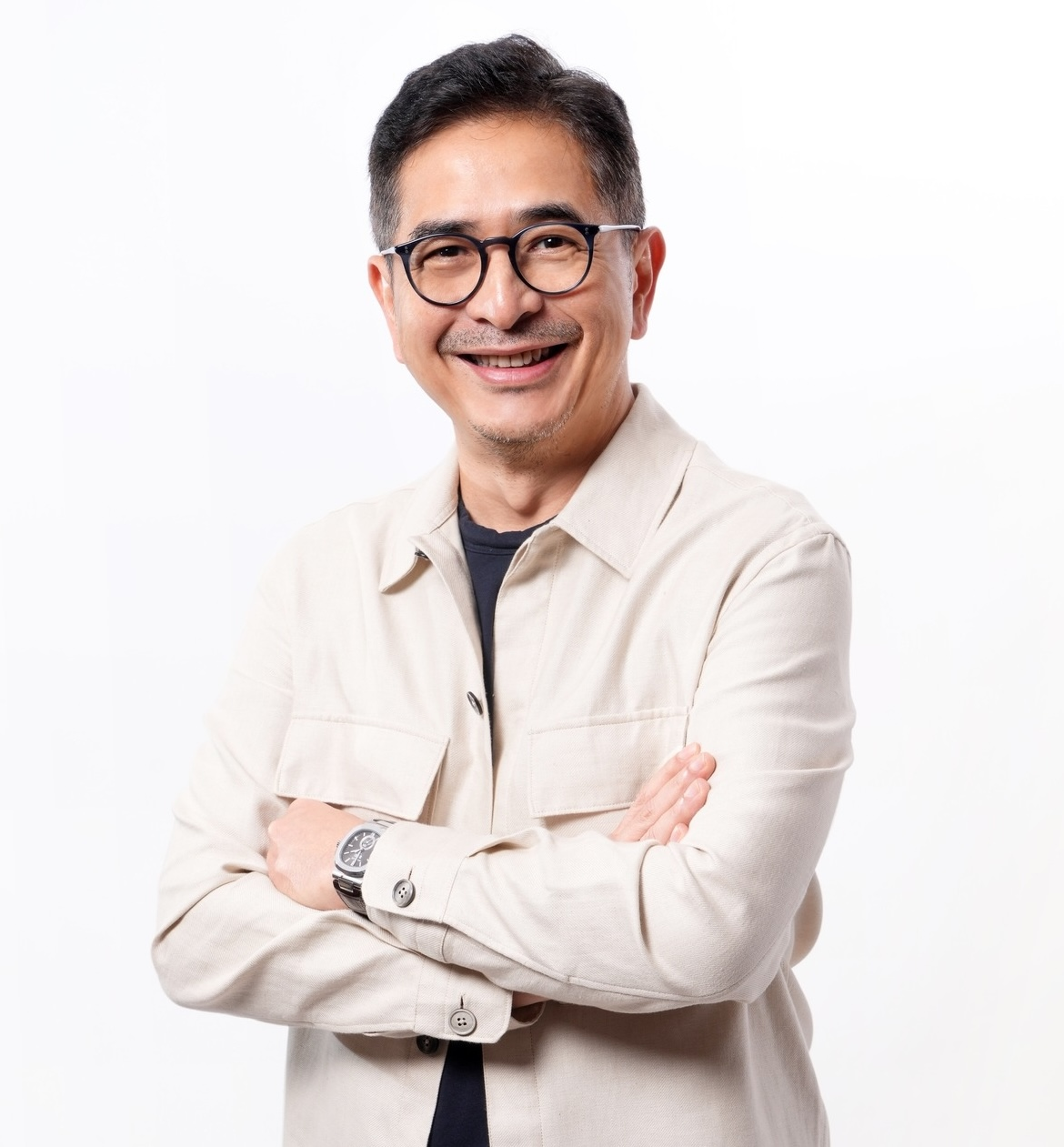
- Born: 16 March 1970 (age 56); Jakarta, Indonesia
- Education: University of Southern California; Pepperdine University (BBA)
- Occupation: Businessperson
- Title: President Director, Indika Energy; President Commissioner, Kopi Kenangan; Commissioner, Grab Indonesia

11th Chairperson of Kadin Indonesia
- In office 7 July 2021 – 16 January 2025
- Deputy: Anindya Novyan Bakrie
- Preceded by: Rosan Roeslani
- Succeeded by: Anindya Novyan Bakrie

Arsjad Rasjid (born 16 March 1970) is an Indonesian businessman who is president director of the mining and energy firm Indika Energy. He also serves as commissioner in several other companies, and he was the chairman of the Indonesian Chamber of Commerce and Industry from 2021 until 2025. In September 2023, he was appointed as chairman of the 2024 presidential bid of Ganjar Pranowo.

== Early life and education ==
Arsjad Rasjid was born on 16 March 1970 in Jakarta. His father H.M.N. Rasjid had served in the Indonesian Army and originated from Palembang, while his mother Suniawati was of mixed Sundanese-Chinese descent. He began studying abroad at the age of 9, when he began to study in Singapore. He later studied computer science at the University of Southern California, but later transferred received a bachelors in business administration from Pepperdine University in 1993. During his studies in California, he met Agus Lasmono Sudwikatmono.

== Business career ==
After returning from their studies in the US, Rasjid and Lasmono co-founded a multimedia company, PT Prabu Wahana, in 1995. The company later was renamed to Indika, shorthand for Industri Multimedia dan Informatika (Multimedia and Information Industry). During the Asian financial crisis, Rasjid helped restructure of the company owned by Lasmono's father Sudwikatmono. Rasjid and Lasmono began showing an interest in the energy sector in 2002, initially intending to invest in power generation before discovering a strong demand from China for coal. The pair received funding from South Korean banks, and Indika Energy began operations in 2005. Within Indika, Rasjid had become vice president director and president commissioner, but had primarily been president director, holding the position between 2007–2014 and since 2016. Outside Indika Energy and affiliated companies, Rasjid is also commissioner in several companies, including Grab Indonesia.

== Political involvement ==
On 4 September 2023, Rasjid was appointed as chairman of Ganjar Pranowo's 2024 presidential campaign. Although Rasjid had previously indicated his intention to join the campaign team, he claimed that his appointment as chairman was done without prior communication and that he had found out about it from friends during an event who showed him online news articles about his appointment.
