= Edy Junaedi Harahap =

Acting regent of Padang Lawas Regency

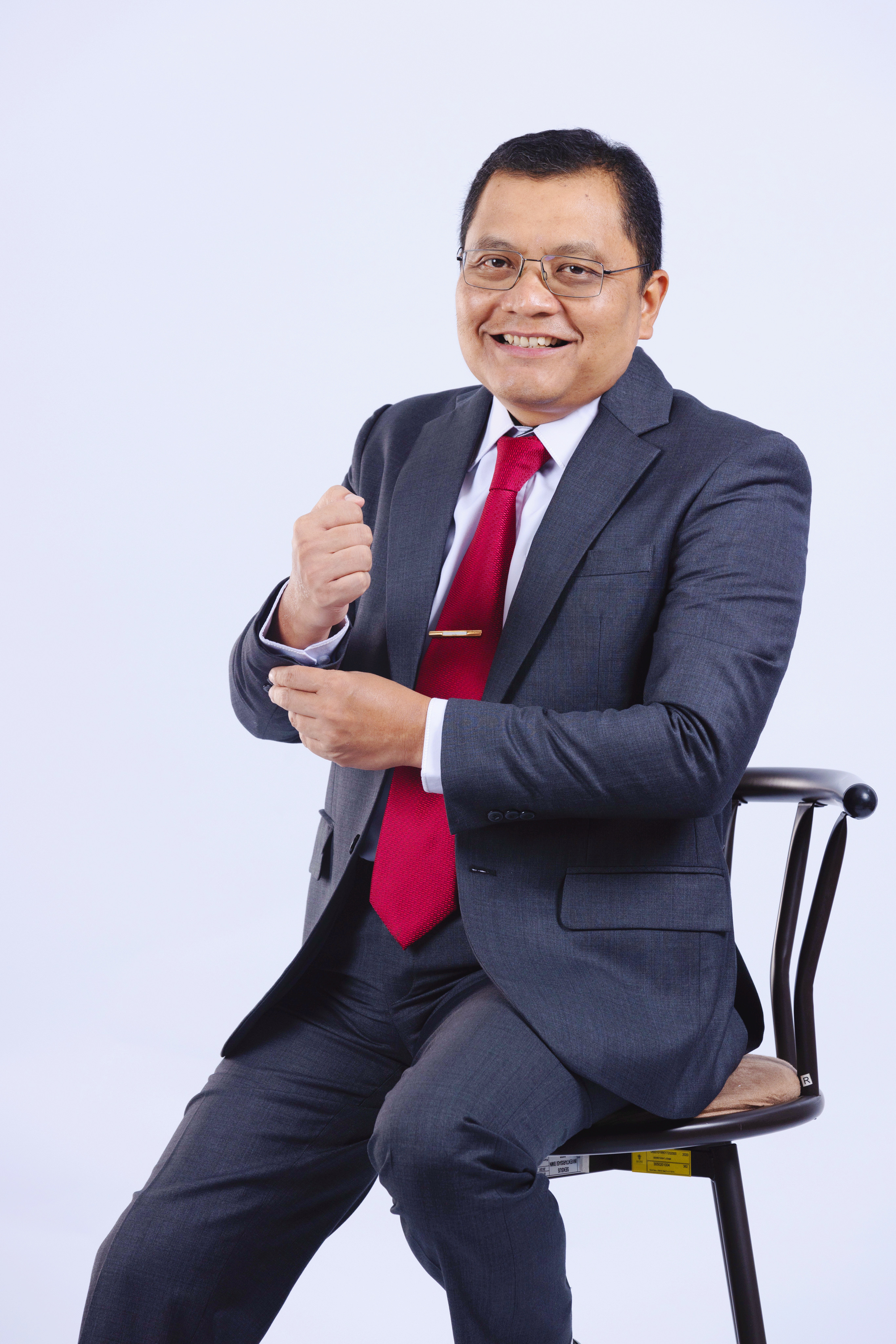
- Edy Junaedi Harahap as the Deputy Chairman of Investment Supervision & Controlling in Ministry of Investment (Indonesia)

Acting 5th Regent of Padang Lawas Regency
- In office 12 Februari 2024 – 19 June 2024
- Governor: Hasanuddin (Pj.)
- Preceded by: Ahmad Zarnawi Pasaribu
- Succeeded by: Ir. Ardan Noor Hasibuan, MM

Personal details
- Born: November 30, 1976 (age 49) Jakarta, Indonesia
- Spouse: RR Sri Retno Hadiningsih
- Children: 2
- Education: Universitas Padjadjaran

Edy Junaedi Harahap, M.Si, born 30 November 1976, was the Acting Regent (Pj Bupati) of Padang Lawas in February to June 2024. He currently holds office as the Deputy Chairman of Investment Supervision & Controlling in Ministry of Investment (Indonesia).

== Education ==
Harahap graduated from the Jakarta High School of Government Affairs (STPDN) in 1999. He then obtained further degrees from Universitas Satyagama (2001) and Universitas Padjadjaran (2008).

== DPMPTSP & Closing Down Alexis ==
In July 2015, the former governor of Jakarta, Basuki Tjahaja Purnama appointed Harahap as the Head of Investment and One-Stop Services Office (DPMPTSP). The former governor who is known colloquially as Ahok cited his psychological test result as surpassing every other candidate.

On 27 October 2017, Harahap on behalf of DPMPTSP issued the Letter No. 68661-1.858.8 to reject the re-registration of Tourism Business Registration License (TDUP) of Alexis, a "Spa & Massage Hotel" infamous for its prostitution practices.

== Tourism, Culture & Resignation ==
On 25 February 2019, Harahap was appointed by former governor Anies Baswedan as the Head of Tourism & Culture Office (Disparbud). He only held the position for eight months before resigning into a staff post in Taman Mini Indonesia Indah on 31 October 2019.

== Ministry of Investment ==
On 6 January 2021, Harahap was among the thirteen officials appointed by Minister of Investment Bahlil Lahadalia into the Primary High Leadership Positions (Pimpinan Tinggi Pratama) in the Ministry of Investment (Indonesia). This marked his return to the high decision-making post since 2019, and his longest ongoing tenure since the days of BPTSP/DPMPTSP.

== Acting Regent of Padang Lawas ==
On 5 February 2024, Minister of Home Affairs Tito Karnavian released the Decree Letter No. 100.2.1.3–447/2024, instructing the appointment of Edy Junaedi Harahap as the Acting Regent or Penjabat Bupati of the Padang Lawas Regency, replacing the previous ad interim Regent Ahmad Zarnawi Pasaribu, whose tenure was about to end. Harahap was anointed on 19 February 2024 by Acting Governor of North Sumatera Hasanuddin in Aula Tengku Rizal Nurdin, Medan.

Right off his anointment, Harahap worked to supervise the 2024 Indonesian general election in Padang Lawas together with the regional General Elections Commission (KPU) and General Election Supervisory Agency (Bawaslu). Within a month of holding the position, he has expressed several initiatives to increase the Human Development Index (HDI) of the Padang Lawas Regency—which is currently the 6th lowest among 33 regencies and cities in North Sumatera-- as well as to conduct a major structural makeover in the regional government.

Following President Jokowi's visit on 15 March 2024, Harahap assembled the regional government units in Padang Lawas to coordinate with the central government, in the spirit of the President's directive, and collaborate to develop the regency's infrastructure, which included the following:

- Public health: improving and renovating the facilities of RSUD Sibuhuan.
- Road infrastructure: adding the Sihapung-Madina and Sosopan-Aek Godang roads into the Presidential Instructions for Regional Roads/Inpres Jalan Daerah (IJD).
- Food security: increasing the capacity and size of the BULOG warehouse in Huta Lombang, as well as requesting support in the form of farming tools and irrigation networks.
- Jobs: requesting the construction of Vocational Training Hall/Balai Latihan Kerja (BLK) UPTD & UPTP, as well as registering tourist villages for the national award program.

On 6 June 2024, Harahap was appointed by the Minister of Investment Bahlil Lahadalia as Deputy Chairman of Investment Supervision & Controlling in the Ministry of Investment, which automatically ended his tenure as the Acting Regent of Padang Lawas.

== Achievements ==
Over his career, Harahap has accumulated several notable achievements, from "Best District Head In Jakarta" ("Karya Praja Utama Nugraha") in 2010 to "Pejabat Pimpinan Pertama Teladan Tingkat Nasional" ("National Exemplary Primary High Leadership") in 2018. During his tenure in BPBD (Regional Disaster Management Agency), he worked with World Bank dan Australia-Indonesia Facility for Disaster Reduction (AIFDR) to create the Jakarta Flood Map.

Under his leadership, DPMPTSP managed to churn out numerous innovations such as the Public Services Mall ("Mal Pelayanan Publik"), online business permit (SIUP-TDP), Permit Delivery Service or AJIB ("Antar-Jemput Izin Bermotor"), IMB 3.0, JakEvo, Jakarta Investment Centre, as well as free architect consulting for building permit or IMB.

== Disinformation ==
When the news of his resignation from the Jakarta Tourism & Culture Office broke out, there were polemics regarding the 5 billion budget for social media influencers, supposedly to boost the city's tourism number—which was also included in the discourse surrounding Anies Baswedan's alleged 82 billion "lem aibon" budget fiasco in the 2020 Temporary Priority Budget Plan for Jakarta (Rencana Kebijakan Umum Anggaran Prioritas Plafon Anggaran Sementara [KUA-PPAS] DKI 2020). The current Special Staff V for Minister of State-Owned Enterprises Erick Thohir, who was then a politician of the Indonesian Solidarity Party (PSI), Tsamara Amany, took to social media to express her support for Edy, whom she had once worked with during the Ahok tenure.

"I'm among those who speak with pride to have once worked with Edy Junaedi back in PTSP. One of those civil servants who are clean, innovative, and hardworking. Whatever his decision might be, I hope it won't deter his devotion to Jakarta," said Tsamara on her Twitter account.

The Ministry of Communications and Informatics had since published a release denying the influencer budget as disinformation or hoax.
