= Investment Coordinating Board =

Government agency of Indonesia

- Badan Koordinasi Penanaman Modal; BKPM
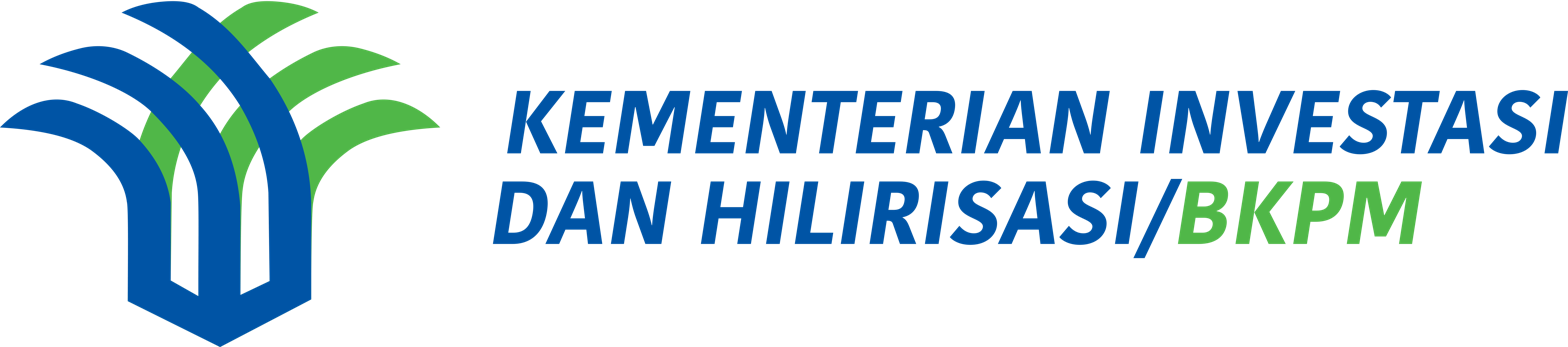

Agency overview
- Formed: 1973
- Preceding agency: Investment Technical Committee
- Jurisdiction: Government of Indonesia
- Headquarters: Jl. Jend. Gatot Subroto No. 44, Jakarta 12190 P.O. Box 3186, Indonesia
- Agency executive: Rosan Roeslani, Minister of Investment/Head of Investment Coordinating Board
- Website: www.bkpm.go.id/en/home

The Indonesia Investment Coordinating Board (Indonesian: Badan Koordinasi Penanaman Modal, BKPM) was until 2021 a Non-Ministerial Government Body in Indonesia for formulation of government policies in the field of investment, both domestically and abroad. Since 2021, it was elevated into a ministry, the Ministry of Investment.

== History ==
ICB was established in 1973, replacing the function carried out by the Investment Technical Committee (Indonesian: Panitia Teknis Penanaman Modal) which was formed previously in 1968. In 1982, ICB absorbed Ministry of Development for Domestic Product (Indonesian: Kementerian Peningkatan Penggunaan Produksi Dalam Negeri). In 1988, ICB transformed into State Ministry of Investment (Indonesian: Kementerian Menteri Negara Penanaman Modal). In 1998, ICB/State Ministry of Investment was merged into Ministry of State Owned Enterprises. The merging decision was reverted in 2001.

With the enactment of the Law on Investment in 2007, ICB became a Government agency that is the coordinator of investment policy, both among government agencies, the government and Bank Indonesia, as well as the government with regional governments as well as regional governments with regional governments. ICB is also mandated as an advocacy body for investors.

=== Alcoholic Beverages Investment Controversy ===
In 2021, president signed the presidential regulation on investment. However, the presidential regulation became controversy as the regulation regulated the investment on alcoholic beverages. The alcoholic beverages investment regulation annex was repealed.

=== Ministry of Investment ===
On 30 March 2021, Joko Widodo submitted a Presidential Letter No. R-14/Pres/03/2021 to People's Representative Council contained a proposal for major change his cabinet. In his Presidential Letter, Ministry of Investment, will be spin off from existing Coordinating Ministry for Maritime and Investments Affairs to be independent ministry on its own, but still under its coordination.

On 9 April 2021, People's Representative Council, approved the changes.

The form of the ministry is not yet known at that time of announcement of approval. It was speculated that the new ministry either split off from part of Coordinating Ministry for Maritime and Investments Affairs or elevation of existing Indonesia Investment Coordinating Board. However, it later confirmed that the ministry actually elevation of Indonesia Investment Coordinating Board. If done, this ministry is continuation of previously Suharto era and early Reformasi era's Habibie State Ministry of the Promotion of Investment, which existed during 1993 to 1999, during Sixth Development Cabinet and Development Reform Cabinet, respectively.

On 13 April 2021, Ali Mochtar Ngabalin, spokesperson and expert professional of Deputy IV (Information and Political Communication) Presidential Staff Office, announced that the second reshuffle will take place on second week of April 2021. However, due to many reasons, the second reshuffle finally announced at 28 April 2021. Unusual for reshuffle happened in Indonesia, this reshuffle was the first of its kind which not only reshuffled the ministers, but also disbanding ministry institutions during the mid-term. In this reshuffle, Bahlil Lahadalia appointed as the first holder of Minister of Investment. All appointed officials inaugurated and their respective new offices were established with Presidential Decision No. 72/P/2021.

== Head of ICB ==
- Mohammad Sadli (1967–1973)
- Barli Halim (1973–1981)
- Ismail Saleh (1981–1982)
- Suhartoyo (1982–1985)
- Ginandjar Kartasasmita (1985–1988)
- Sanyoto Sastrowardoyo (1988–1998)
- Hamzah Haz (1998–1999)
- Marzuki Usman (1999)
- Zuhal (Caretaker) (1999)
- Laksamana Sukardi (1999–2000)
- M. Rozy Munir (2000)
- Theo Toemion (2001–2005)
- Muhammad Lutfi (2005–2009)
- Gita Wirjawan (2009–2012)
- Muhammad Chatib Basri (2012–2013)
- Mahendra Siregar (2013–2014)
- Franky Sibarani (2014–2016)
- Thomas Trikasih Lembong (2016–2019)
- Bahlil Lahadalia (2019–2024)
- Rosan Roeslani (2024–)

== Main Responsibilities and Functions ==
BKPM has the task of coordinating policies and services in the investment sector based on the provisions of laws and regulations. In carrying out these main tasks, BKPM carries out the following functions:

1. Reviewing and proposing a national investment plan
2. Coordination of the implementation of national policies in the investment sector
3. Reviewing and proposing investment service policies
4. Determination of norms, standards and procedures for the implementation of investment service activities
5. Development of investment opportunities and potential in the region by empowering business entities
6. Making a map of investment in Indonesia
7. Coordination of promotion implementation and investment cooperation
8. Development of the investment business sector through investment development. among others, increasing partnerships, increasing competitiveness, creating fair business competition, and disseminating information as widely as possible within the scope of investment management.
9. Fostering the implementation of investment, and providing assistance in solving various obstacles and consulting on problems faced by investors in carrying out investment activities
10. Coordination and implementation of one-stop integrated services
11. Coordination of domestic investors who carry out their investment activities outside the territory of Indonesia
12. Providing licensing services and investment facilities
13. Guidance and general administration services in the fields of general planning, administration, organization and management, personnel, education and training, finance, law, public relations, archives, data and information processing, equipment and household; and
14. Implementation of other functions in the field of investment in accordance with the provisions of the legislation.

== Organization ==
Based on Presidential Decree Nos. 184/2024 and 185/2024 and Ministry of Investment and Downstreaming Policy Decree No. 2/2024, the agency consisted of:

1. Office of the Chief of Indonesia Investment Coordinating Board.
2. Office of the Vice Chief of Indonesia Investment Coordinating Board
3. Main Secretariat
  1. Bureau of Funds and Programs Planning
  2. Bureau of Law Affairs
  3. Bureau of Human Resources and Organization
  4. Bureau of Protocols and Public Relations
  5. Bureau of General Affairs and Finance
4. Deputy of Investment Planning (Deputy I)
  1. Directorate of Macro-investment
  2. Directorate of Natural Resources Investment and Manufacture Industries Investment Planning
  3. Directorate of Services and Regional Investment Planning
  4. Directorate of Infrastructure Planning
5. Deputy of Strategic Investment Downstreaming (Deputy II)
  1. Directorate of Investment Strategy and Administration
  2. Directorate of Investment in Plantation and Forestry Downstreaming
  3. Directorate of Investment in Fishery and Maritime Downstreaming
  4. Directorate of Investment in Oil and Gas Downstreaming
  5. Directorate of Investment in Minerals and Coal Downstreaming
6. Deputy of Investment Climate Development (Deputy III)
  1. Directorate of Investment Deregulation
  2. Directorate of Regional Potential Development
  3. Directorate of Enterprises Empowerment
7. Deputy of Investment Promotion (Deputy IV)
  1. Directorate of Investment Promotion Development
  2. Directorate of Investment Promotion in America and Europe
  3. Directorate of Investment Promotion in East Asia, South Asia, Middle East, and Africa
  4. Directorate of Investment Promotion in Southeast Asia, Australia, New Zealand, and Pacific
8. Deputy of Investment Cooperation (Deputy V)
  1. Directorate of Bilateral Investment Cooperation
  2. Directorate of Regional and Multilateral Investment Cooperation
  3. Directorate of Businesses Cooperation
9. Deputy of Investment Services (Deputy VI)
  1. Directorate of Investment Services in Industrial Sectors
    1. Sub-directorate of Investment Services in Agronomical, Chemicals, Pharmaceuticals, and Textile Sectors
    2. Sub-directorate of Investment Services in Metals, Machinery, Transportation, and Electronics Sectors
  2. Directorate of Investment Services in Non-Industrial Sectors
    1. Sub-directorate of Investment Services in Natural Resources, Infrastructures, and Transportation Sectors
    2. Sub-directorate of Investment Services in Trade, Tourism, and Others
  3. Directorate of Investment Services in Entrepreneurship Facilitation
    1. Sub-directorate of Investment Services in Primary and Tertiary Sectors
    2. Sub-directorate of Investment Services in Secondary Sectors
10. Deputy of Control of Investment Implementation (Deputy VII)
  1. Controlling Directorate Region I (Aceh, North Sumatera, Riau, Riau Islands, South Sumatera, Lampung)
  2. Controlling Directorate Region II (Jambi, Jakarta, Yogyakarta, East Kalimantan, South Kalimantan, West Kalimantan, and Central Kalimantan)
  3. Controlling Directorate Region III (West Java, Banten, Central Java, South Sulawesi, Central Sulawesi, Southeast Sulawesi, and North Sulawesi)
  4. Controlling Directorate Region IV (East Jawa, Bali, West Nusa Tenggara, East Nusa Tenggara, Maluku, North Maluku, All Papua except West Papua and Southwest Papua)
  5. Controlling Directorate Region V (Bengkulu, Bangka Belitung, North Kalimantan, West Sulawesi, Gorontalo, West Papua, and Southwest Papua)
11. Deputy of Investment Information and Technology (Deputy VIII)
  1. Directorate of Business Licensing System
  2. Directorate of Electronic Services, Infrastructures, and Networking
  3. Directorate of Data and Information
12. Centers
  1. Education and Training Center
  2. Center for Investment Administrators Fostering
13. Office of the General Inspectorate

== Gallery ==
BKPM Logo (1997–2002)

BKPM Logo (2002–2003)

BKPM Logo (2003–2004)

BKPM Logo (2004–2010)

Logo BKPM (2010–2021)

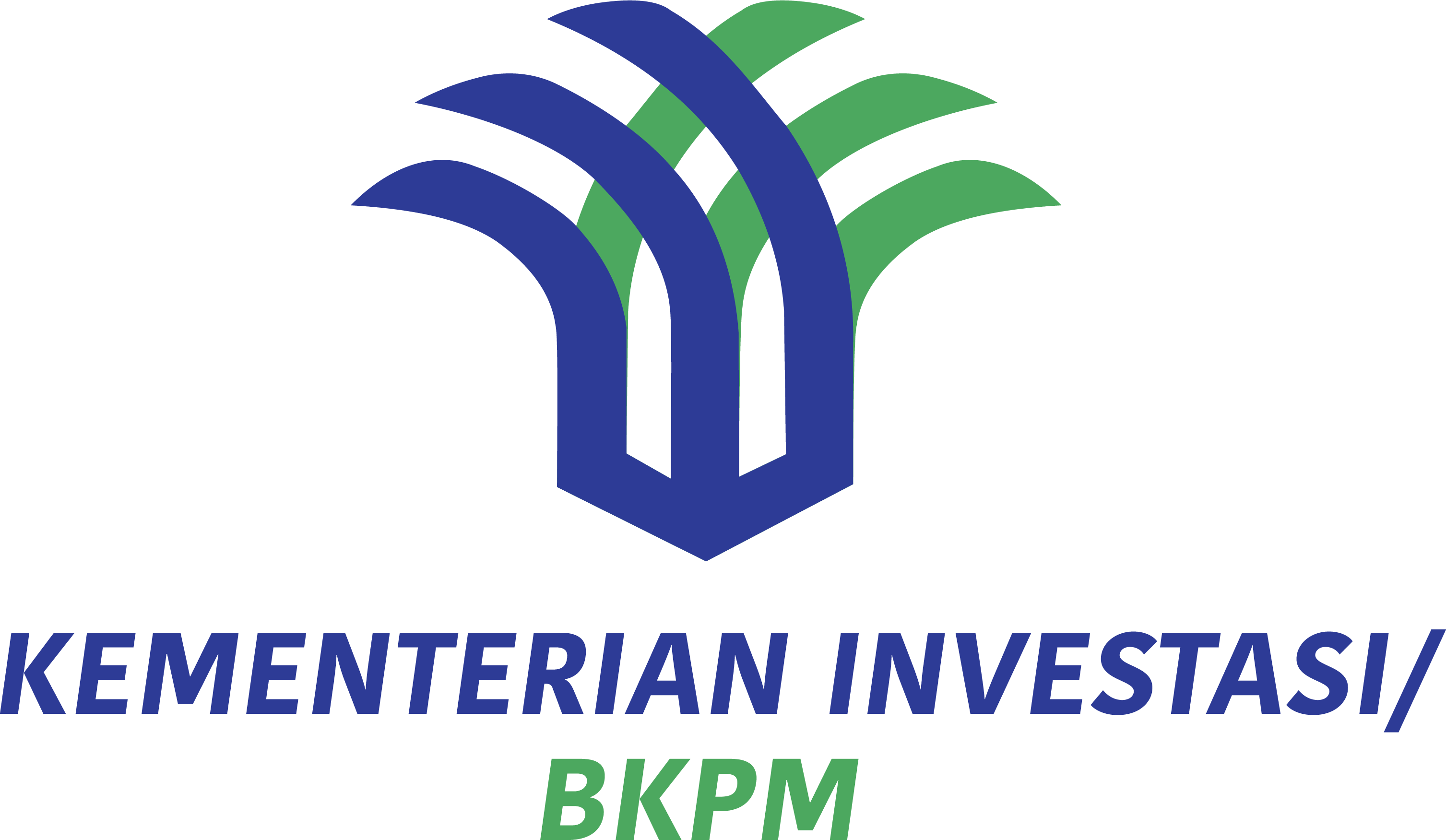
Logo of Ministry of Investment/ BKPM (2021–2024)

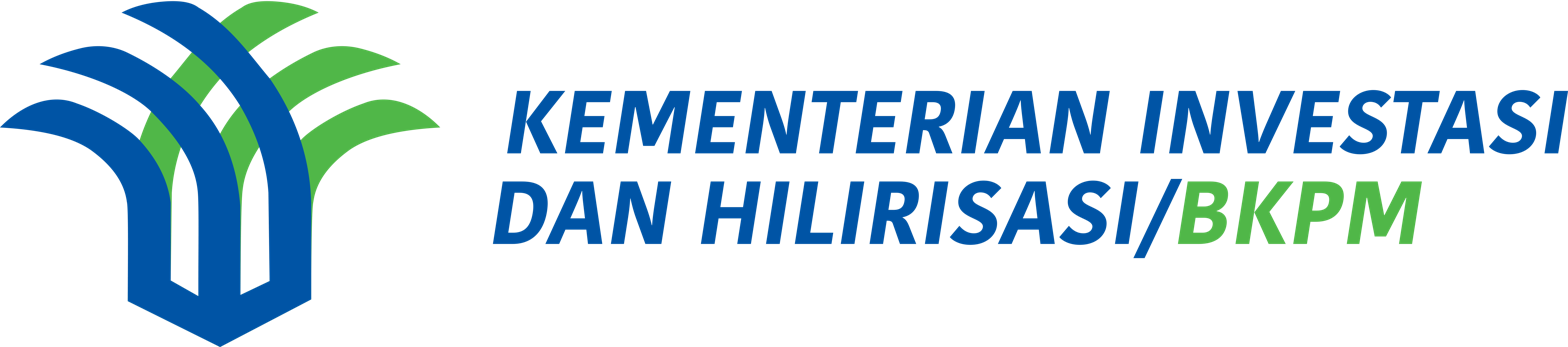
Logo Ministry of Investment and Downstream Industry/ BKPM (2024–present)
