= Ganjar Pranowo 2024 presidential campaign =

Electoral campaign in Indonesia

Ganjar Pranowo for President
- Campaign: 2024 Indonesian presidential election
- Candidate: Ganjar Pranowo; Governor of Central Java (2013–2023); Mahfud MD; Coordinating Minister for Political, Legal, and Security Affairs (2019–2024)
- Affiliation: Alliance of Political Parties Supporting Ganjar Pranowo
- Status: Registered: 19 October 2023; Authorized: 13 November 2023; Lost election: 20 March 2024
- Headquarters: High End Building, Kebon Sirih, Menteng, Jakarta
- Key people: Chief executive: Arsjad Rasjid; Secretary: Hasto Kristiyanto
- Slogan(s): Gerak Cepat, Indonesia Raya, Indonesia Unggul, Indonesia Lebih Baik! (Move Fast, for Greater Indonesia, for Superior Indonesia, for Better Indonesia!)

Website
- ganjarmahfud03.id

The electoral campaign for the 2024 Indonesian presidential election of Ganjar Pranowo, two-term governor of Central Java, was officially launched in April 2023 upon his party the Indonesian Democratic Party of Struggle's endorsement of his candidacy on 21 April 2023. On 18 October 2023, PDI-P endorsed Mahfud MD as candidate vice president.

== Background ==
Ganjar Pranowo was elected the governor of Central Java, one of Indonesia's most populous provinces, in 2013. After being elected for two terms as governor, Ganjar's potential candidacy as President of Indonesia was floated with incumbent Joko Widodo ("Jokowi") reaching his second term. While several government officials proposed an extension to the term limit, the issue was shelved. In the immediate aftermath of the 2019 Indonesian presidential election, a number of pollsters began to consider Ganjar as a likely candidate in 2024, and by 2020 he was already one of the highest-polling prospective candidates. By mid-2022, Indonesian media began interpreting Jokowi's actions as showing support for Ganjar.

== Timeline ==
=== Becoming PDI-P's candidate ===
Ganjar first publicly indicated his willingness to run as a PDI-P backed presidential candidate in an interview with BeritaSatu on 18 October 2022. Within PDI-P, Ganjar primarily competed for the party's endorsement with Puan Maharani, Speaker of the People's Representative Council and daughter of party leader Megawati Sukarnoputri. The Indonesian Solidarity Party (PSI), a party not represented in the People's Representative Council, had declared its support for Ganjar's candidacy by 3 October 2022.

=== Party endorsements ===
Ganjar was officially declared as PDI-P's candidate on 21 April 2023 during a party event attended by Jokowi, Megawati, and other party elites. Several days later, the United Development Party followed suit. Two non-parliamentary parties, the Perindo Party and the People's Conscience Party (Hanura), declared their support for Ganjar's candidacy in June and August 2023, respectively. PSI retracted its support for Ganjar in August 2023.

=== Running mate ===
Several politicians have been named by the campaign team as a potential running mate for Ganjar, including Sandiaga Uno (Minister of Tourism and Creative Economy ; 2019 running mate to Prabowo Subianto), Mahfud MD (Coordinating Minister for Political, Legal, and Security Affairs), Andika Perkasa (former Commander of the Indonesian National Armed Forces), Ridwan Kamil (Governor of West Java, 2018–2023), and Muhammad Zainul Majdi (Governor of West Nusa Tenggara, 2008–2018). On 19 October 2023, it was announced that Mahfud MD would become the vice presidential candidate, and the following day the pair officially registered with the General Elections Commission.

=== Campaign motif ===
In preparation for the 2024 Indonesian presidential election, PDI-P-endorsed presidential candidate, Ganjar Pranowo, adopted the all black attire and three-finger salute as his campaign motif and hand gesture, replacing the rock n' roll hand symbol signed by Ganjar during the candidate number reveal. On 20 November 2023, a video widely shared on his Twitter account, Ganjar was seen raising his hands in the three-finger salute amidst a crowd of supporters, dressed in all black. the salute signify "Three fingers three promises: Obey God, obey the law, and be loyal to the people."

== Campaign team ==
On 4 September 2023, the coalition parties appointed chairman of the Indonesian Chamber of Commerce and Industry Arsjad Rasjid as chairman of the campaign team, while Andika Perkasa and former deputy chief of the Indonesian National Police, Gatot Eddy Pramono were appointed as deputy chairmen.

The campaign headquarters was established at the High End Building in Kebon Sirih, Menteng, Central Jakarta, the same building used as headquarters by the Joko Widodo 2019 presidential campaign.

== Coalition parties ==
- Indonesian Democratic Party of Struggle (PDIP)
- United Development Party (PPP)
- Hanura Party
- Perindo Party

Withdrawn support:

- Indonesian Solidarity Party (PSI) – withdrawn in August 2023 in favor of Prabowo Subianto.

== Logistics ==
Ganjar Pranowo's campaign spent 506 billion rupiahs (32.33 million 2024 United States dollars), surpassing both Prabowo Subianto 2024 presidential campaign's 208 billion rupiahs and Anies Baswedan 2024 presidential campaign's 49 billion rupiahs.
