= Laksamana Sukardi =

Indonesian politician

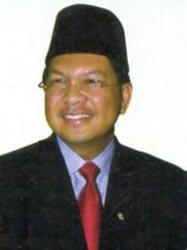

2nd Ministry of State Owned Enterprises
- In office 10 August 2001 – 20 October 2004
- President: Megawati Soekarnoputri
- Preceded by: Rozy Munir
- Succeeded by: Sugiharto

4th State Minister of Investment and Development of State Owned Enterprises
- In office 26 October 1999 – 26 April 2000
- President: Abdurrahman Wahid
- Preceded by: Marzuki Usman; Tanri Abeng
- Succeeded by: Rozy Munir

Personal details
- Born: 1 October 1956 (age 70) Jakarta, Indonesia
- Spouse: Rethy Sukardi
- Children: Noorani Sukardi, Indraprajna Wardhani Sukardi, Galuh Swarna Sukardi & Galih Anugrah Sukardi
- Education: Institut Teknologi Bandung
- Profession: Politician, banker, economist

Laksamana Sukardi (born 1 October 1956) is an Indonesian politician, reformist and banker who served as Minister of State Owned Enterprises (BUMN) under the presidencies of Abdurrahman Wahid and Megawati Sukarnoputri.

Sukardi was born in Jakarta into a family of the menak or Sundanese aristocracy. His father, Gandhi Sukardi (1929–2011), was a prominent journalist at the Antara state news agency. His grandfather, Raden Didi Sukardi (1898–1971), was also a journalist, plantation owner and government minister of the federal state of Pasundan.

Laksamana Sukardi graduated as a civil engineer from the Bandung Institute of Technology (ITB) in 1979, but decided to pursue a career as an economist and banker. He eventually became part of the senior management of Bank Lippo, and was honoured as Banker of the Year from SWA Magazine in 1993. He also joined the reformist Indonesian Democratic Party of Struggle (PDI-P), and was an outspoken critic of the New Order regime of Soeharto.

His political career began with his election as a legislator in 1992 to the People's Consultative Assembly (MPR). He served in the legislature until 1997, before being appointed in October 1999 to the reformist coalition government of President Abdurrahman Wahid as Minister of State Owned Enterprises in the National Unity Cabinet. Sukardi held this position until April 2000, but was reappointed by the next Indonesian President, Megawati Sukarnoputri, to his old post in August 2001 as part of her Mutual Assistance Cabinet (2001–2004). As Minister of State Owned Enterprises, Laksamana Sukardi presided over one of the most significant programmes of privatisation and or sale of state-owned assets since Independence in 1945.

After leaving office in 2004, Sukardi, together with other leading party bureaucrats such as Arifin Panigoro, led a revolt within the Indonesian Democratic Party of Struggle against party chairman and former president Megawati Sukarnoputri. In 2005, they founded their own Democratic Renewal Party.

He has been questioned by the Attorney-General of Indonesia in a number of high-profile corruption cases since leaving office in 2004. WikiLeaks has also revealed the existence of a blanket gagging order applying to all citizens and media in Australia, issued by the Supreme Court of Victoria on 19 June 2014 for 'national security' reasons, which involves the names of several senior Asian politicians, including Sukardi.
