= Agus Suparmanto =

Indonesian politician

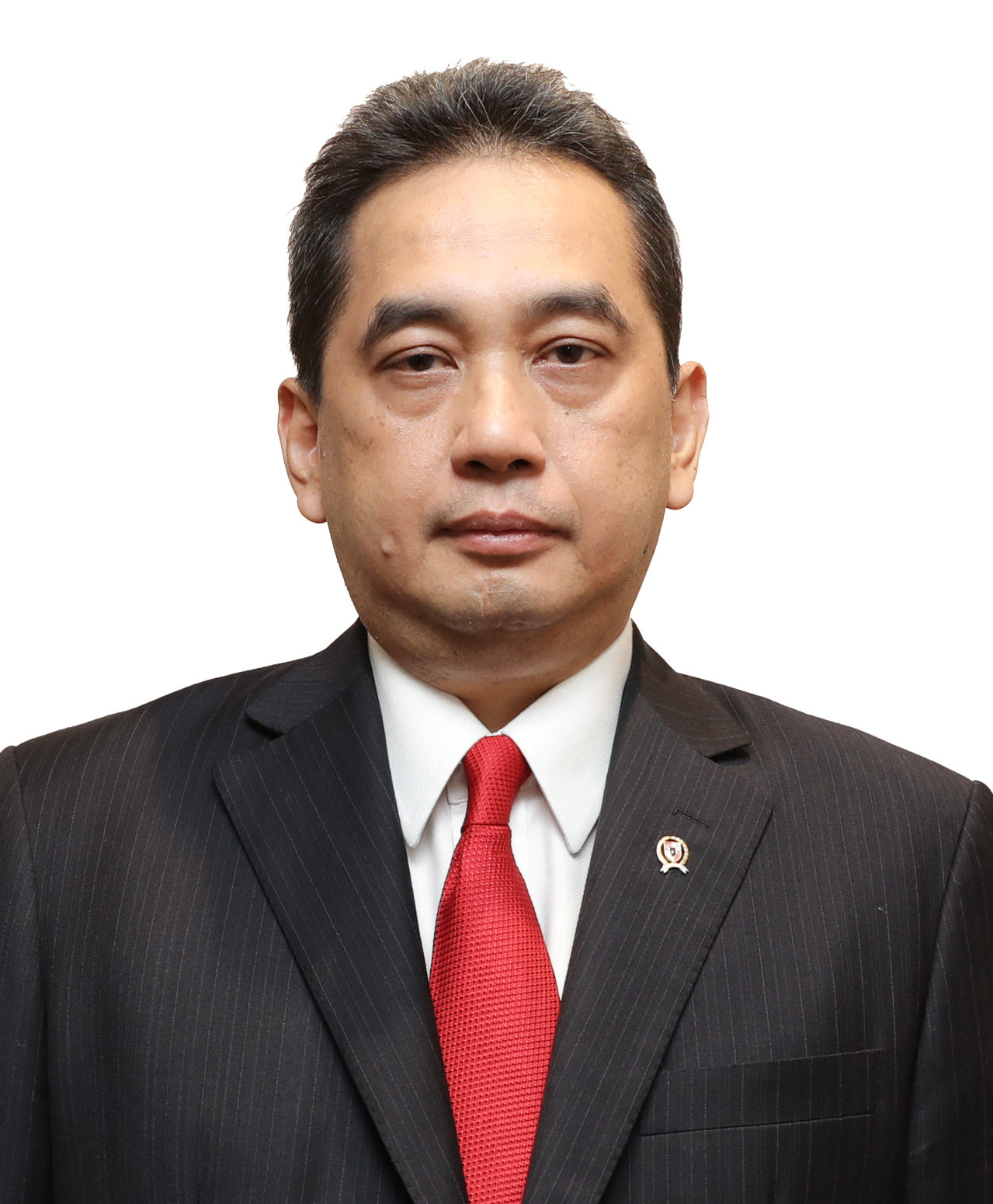
- Agus Suparmanto in 2019

Minister of Trade
- In office 23 October 2019 – 23 December 2020
- President: Joko Widodo
- Preceded by: Enggartiasto Lukita
- Succeeded by: Muhammad Lutfi

Personal details
- Born: 23 December 1965 (age 60) Jakarta, Indonesia
- Party: National Awakening Party

Agus Suparmanto is an Indonesian politician. He served as Minister of Trade in the 41st Cabinet of Indonesia from 23 October 2019 to 23 December 2020. He is affiliated with the National Awakening Party.
