= Gita Wirjawan =

Indonesian investment banker, entrepreneur, philanthropist, musician, and podcaster

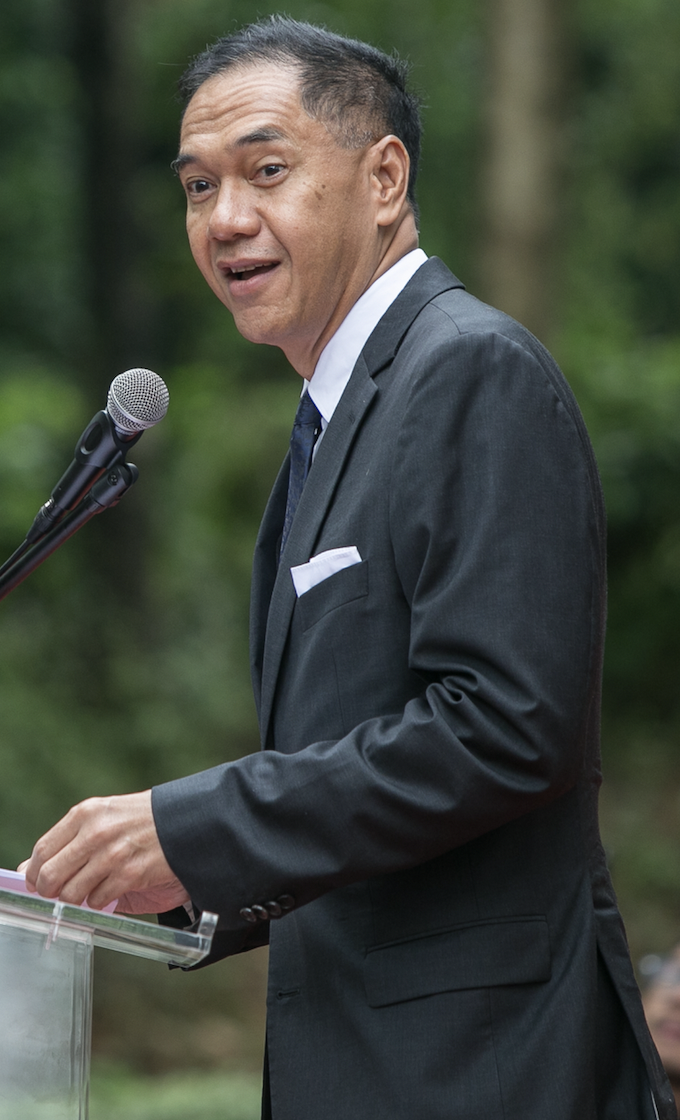

27th Minister of Trade
- In office 19 October 2011 – 31 January 2014
- President: Susilo Bambang Yudhoyono
- Preceded by: Mari Elka Pangestu
- Succeeded by: Muhammad Lutfi

14th Chair of the Investment Coordinating Board
- In office 22 October 2009 – 14 June 2012
- President: Susilo Bambang Yudhoyono
- Preceded by: Muhammad Lutfi
- Succeeded by: Muhammad Chatib Basri

Other roles
- 2012–2016: Chief of the Badminton Association of Indonesia

Personal details
- Born: 21 September 1965 (age 61) Jakarta, Indonesia
- Party: Independent
- Spouse: Yasmin Stamboel Wirjawan (m. 1993)
- Children: 3
- Education: University of Texas (BBA); Baylor University (MBA); Harvard University (MPA)
- Occupation: Politician; businessman; investment banker

Gita Irawan Wirjawan (born 21 September 1965) is an Indonesian entrepreneur, ex-investment banker, music and film producer, and podcaster. Previously, he served as Minister of Trade of the Republic of Indonesia during President Susilo Bambang Yudhoyono's Kabinet Indonesia Bersatu II (Second United Indonesia Cabinet). Wirjawan is the founder of Ancora Group and Ancora Foundation and founding partner at Ikhlas Capital. He was also the head of the Badminton Association of Indonesia from 2012 to 2016.

== Personal life ==
Gita Wirjawan was born in Jakarta to Paula Warokka and Wirjawan Djojosugito. He has Minahasan and Javanese ancestry. The youngest of five children, Wirjawan attended Budi Waluyo Elementary School and Pangudi Luhur Junior High School in Jakarta before moving to Bangladesh, and later to India, at the age of thirteen as his father was serving as a WHO officer in Bangladesh. He completed his high school at the American Embassy School in New Delhi, India.

Wirjawan earned a bachelor's degree in business administration from the University of Texas, Austin, in 1988, a master's degree in business administration from Baylor University in 1989, and a master's degree in public administration from Harvard University's Harvard Kennedy School as a Mason Fellow in 2000. He also qualified as a Certified Public Accountant in the U.S. state of Texas and holds a Chartered Financial Analyst designation.

Wirjawan met his wife, Yasmin Stamboel Wirjawan, during his college summer break. The couple got married in 1993 and has three children.

== Business career ==
Wirjawan began his career as an auditor at the firm of Morrison Brown & Argiz in Miami, Florida in 1989. He joined Citibank in Indonesia in 1992 in the Consumer Banking department, becoming a vice president in 1997. From July 1997 to May 1999 Wirjawan was a director of corporate finance at Bahana Securities, Indonesia. He joined Goldman Sachs, Singapore in July 2000 as a vice president in the Investment Banking Division, followed by a stint at Singapore Technologies Telemedia as a senior vice president, international business development, from 2003 until 2004. From 2004 to 2008 he served as a senior country officer and president director JP Morgan Indonesia.

After leaving JP Morgan in April 2008, Wirjawan established the Ancora Group, focusing on investments in Indonesia. Ancora Capital, a private equity arm of the Group, invests primarily in growth companies in the middle market segment across the consumer and natural resources sectors.

Wirjawan left the Ancora Group in October 2009 to begin his public service until the early part of 2014. Wirjawan returns to Ancora Group in July 2014.

== Public service ==
President Susilo Bambang Yudhoyono appointed Wirjawan as chairman of Indonesia's Investment Coordinating Board (BKPM) in October 2009. Under his leadership, foreign direct investments in Indonesia more than quadrupled from US$4.9bn in 2009 to $21.2bn in 2012.

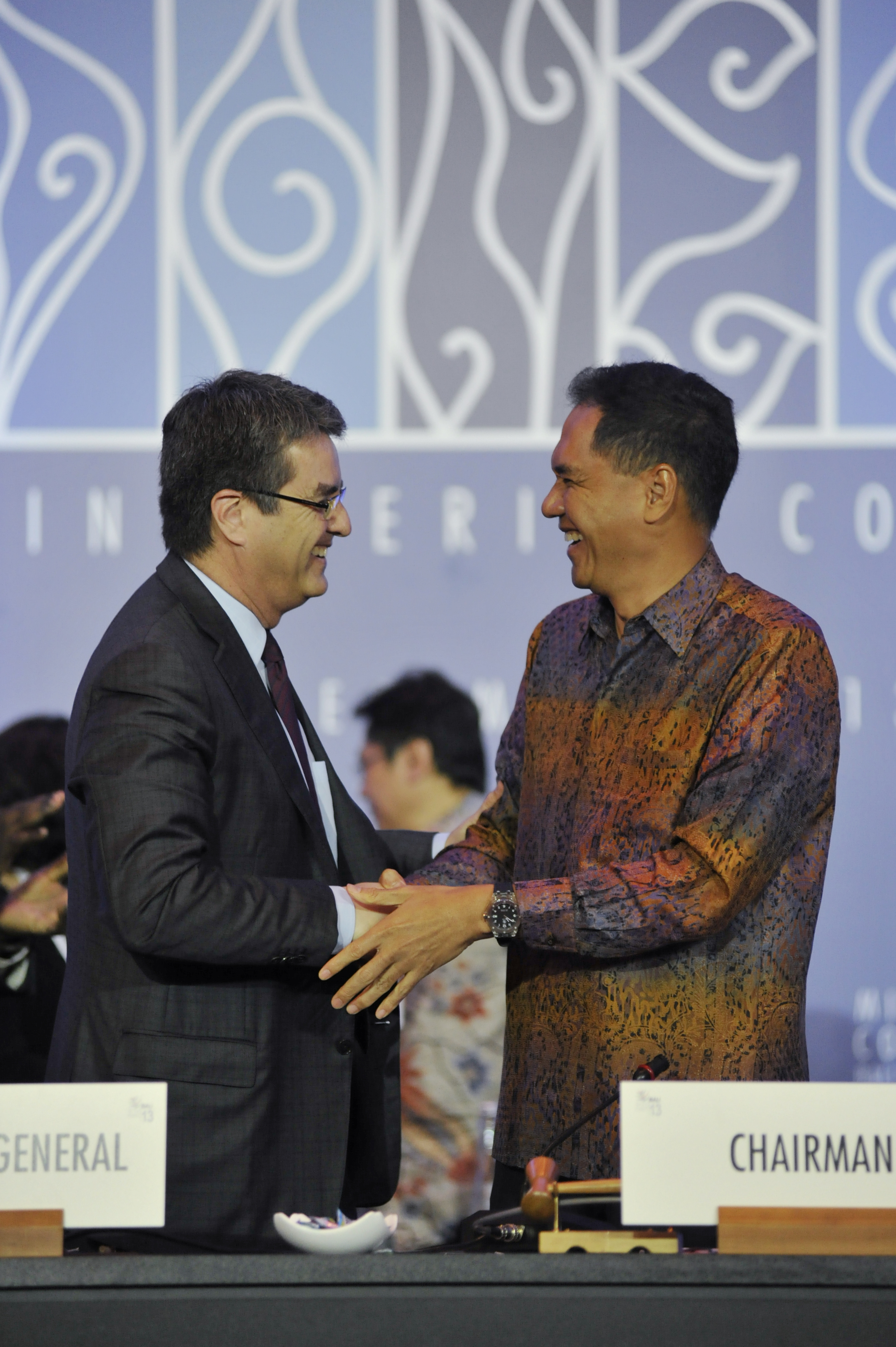
Wirjawan alongside Chairman of the WTO, Roberto Azevêdo, on Day 5 of the Ninth Ministerial Conference, Bali, 3 December 2013.

Wirjawan was appointed as Minister of Trade of Indonesia in October 2011. One of his biggest accomplishments in this role was becoming chairman of the Ninth World Trade Organization Ministerial Conference of 2013 held in Bali 3–7 December 2013, leading the 159 members of the WTO to agree to a package to ease international trade barriers. Also notable was that under his leadership, trade law was finally passed by the House of Representatives on 11 February (or Jan 31, 2014), a new milestone for the country after 80 years of using the previous Dutch-era law.

In February 2014, Wirjawan resigned from his position as minister of trade to participate in the Democratic Party Convention or primaries.

In July 2014, Wirjawan decided to return to Ancora Group.

== Board memberships ==
Wirjawan currently sits on the international advisory board of Chubb Limited. He is a member of the Angsana Council, a non-profit group dedicated to boosting the region's businesses and economies, and global advisory firm Macro Advisory Partners.

Previously, he served as a commissioner of state-owned oil and gas company Pertamina, an independent board director of Axiata Group Berhad, and independent commissioner of PT Excelcomindo Pratama, Tbk.

Actively engaged with and regularly invited to research and educational institutions around the world, he was also a member of the board at various institutions, including Singapore Management University (SMU), Center for Strategic and International Studies in Washington D.C. and at the S. Rajaratnam School of International Studies at Nanyang Technological University.

== Contribution in education and philanthropy ==
=== Endgame Podcast ===
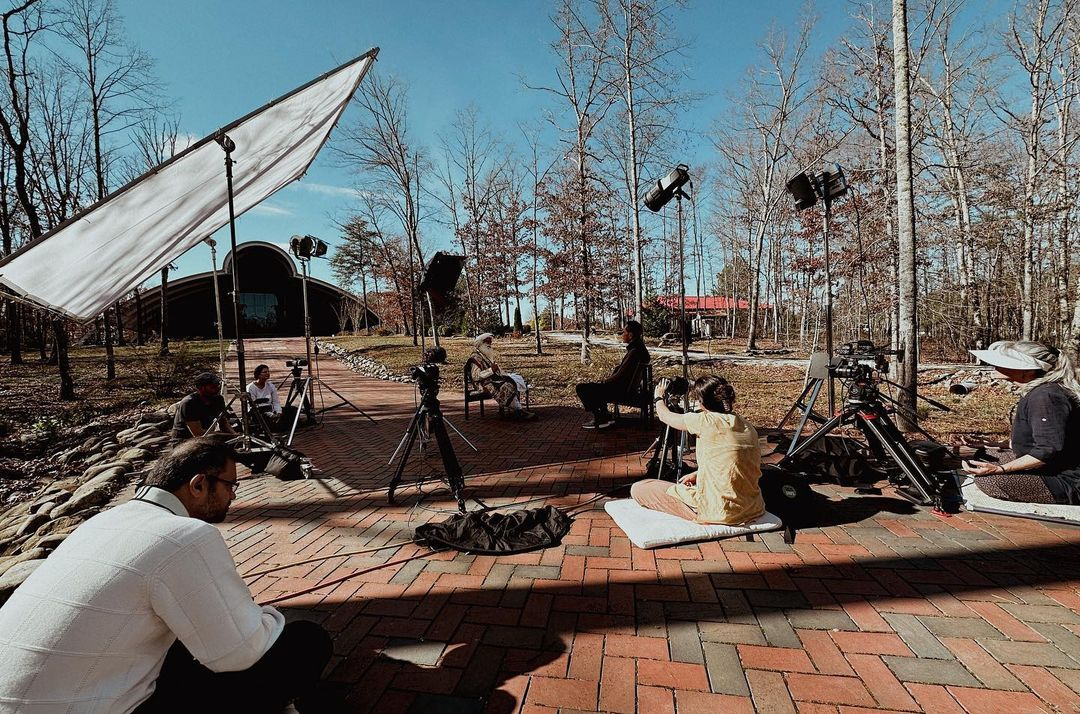
Wirjawan interviewing Sadhguru at the Isha Institute of Inner-sciences, McMinnville, Tennessee, USA.

In 2020, Wirjawan, in collaboration with the School of Government and Public Policy Indonesia and Visinema Pictures, introduced the Endgame podcast. Each episode, lasting one to two hours, delves into significant topics within and beyond Wirjawan's expertise, encouraging guests to discuss matters pertaining to the long game. The podcast has become one of Indonesia's leading educational channels, boasting 840 thousand subscribers and 7 billion YouTube impressions as of August 2024.

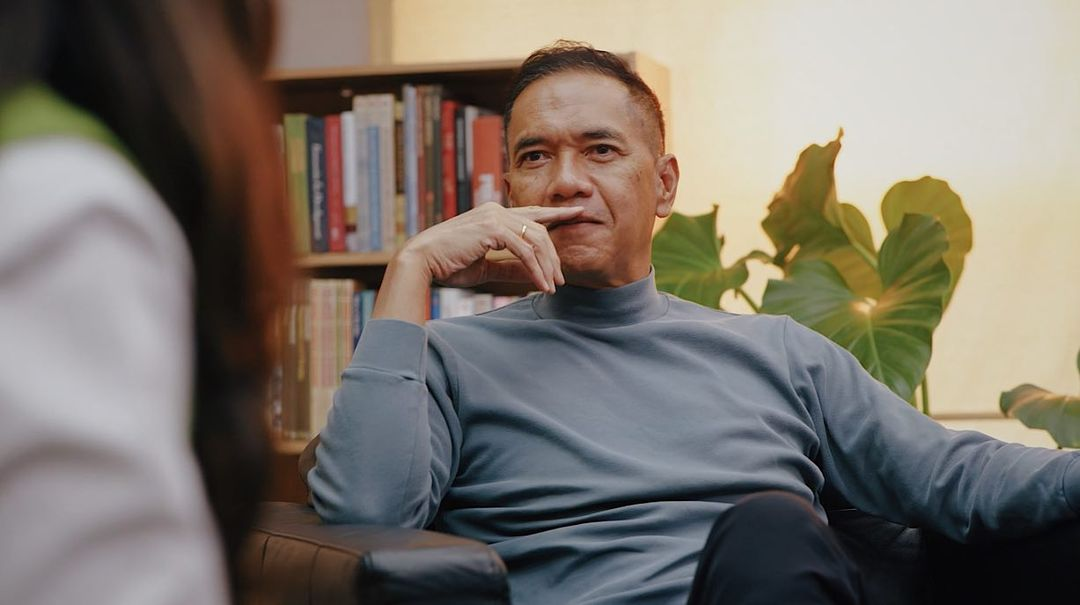
Gita Wirjawan's Endgame Podcast Episode with Shinta Nurfauzia, Co-CEO and Co-Founder of Lemonilo.

Wirjawan is a proponent of lateral thinking, identifying its absence in various aspects of Indonesian life. He emphasizes its incorporation into the nation's contemporary challenges. The podcast covers a broad spectrum of subjects, ranging from philosophy to biohacking, geopolitics to arts and music.

The Endgame podcast has featured renowned global thinkers like Ray Dalio, Yuval Noah Harari, John Mearsheimer, and Sadhguru, marking their inaugural appearances in an Indonesian program and audience.

=== Academic career ===
Since 2022, Wirjawan has been a visiting scholar at Stanford University's Walter H. Shorenstein Asia-Pacific Research Center, in which he undertakes collaborative research, talks and lectures with faculty or staff on Southeast Asia's nation-building directionality. His first paper from his residency at the center has been published by the Center for Strategic and International Studies (CSIS). Titled Money Matters: Democratization and Economic Growth in Southeast Asia Report, the 30-page paper delved into how Southeast Asia can unlock its potential by embracing a new political economy that prioritizes financial inclusion, investment, trade and good governance. His second paper as a Shorenstein APARC visiting scholar is titled The Paradox of Sustainability: A Critique of the Modern World's Approach to Sustainable Development. It dissects the paradox of sustainability that stems from the high expectations placed upon developed and developing nations' environmental and economic progress.

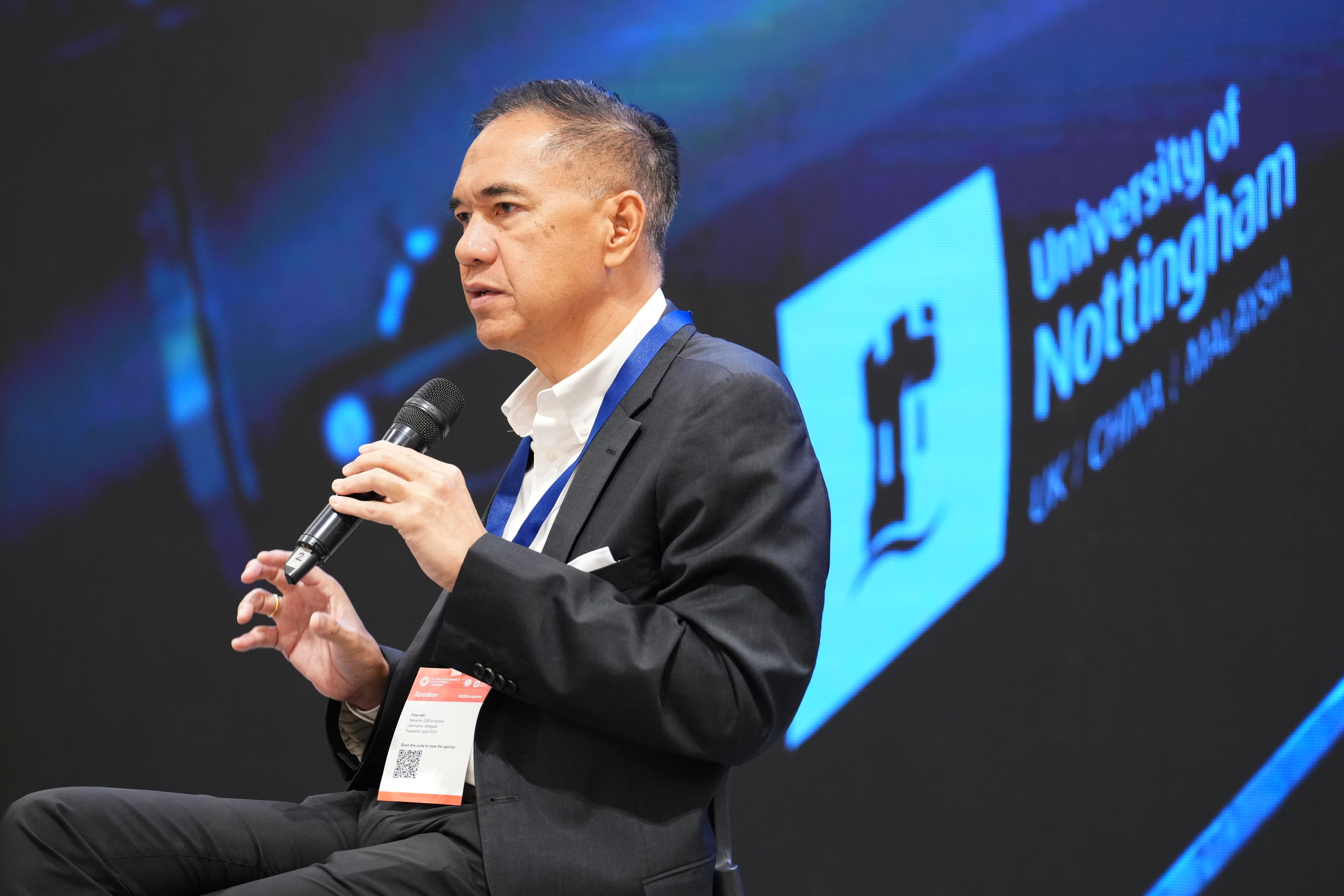
Gita Wirjawan speaking at the Global Sustainable Development Congress, University of Nottingham.

In spring 2024, he was chosen as a Fisher Family visiting fellow at the Belfer Center for Science and International Affairs, Harvard Kennedy School.

Wirjawan is also a nonresident scholar in the Asia Program at the Carnegie Endowment for International Peace.

In December 2013, he received an honorary doctorate in business administration from Naresuan University in Phitsanulok, Thailand in recognition of his role in developing the economy and supporting the future of youth in Indonesia.

Gita also received an honorary professorship from the School of Politics and International Relations, University of Nottingham, UK.

=== Philanthropy ===
Wirjawan has keen interest in education and the important role it could play to propel Indonesia into the ranks of developed nations. He established Ancora Foundation with the mission of helping both early stage education and graduate studies for talented Indonesians. Ancora Foundation has sponsored the training of teachers at 450 kindergartens serving underprivileged children throughout Indonesia, the beneficiaries of which are called "Sekolah Rakyat Ancora". Wirjawan has endowed scholarships for Indonesians to attend top universities around the world, including Harvard University, University of Oxford, Stanford University, University of Cambridge, Universiti Malaya, Nanyang Technological University, and Sciences Po. An avid golfer since he was ten years old, Wirjawan set up Ancora Golf Institute and Ancora Sports to groom future Indonesian golfers. Through its programmes, Ancora Sports has scouted and sponsored young talents such as George Gandranata, Rory Hie, and Jordan Irawan to become top golfers in Indonesia.

== Music and films ==
Learning piano since the age of 6, Wirjawan is an ardent jazz musician. He has performed in concerts and written songs for several albums. He has produced several albums, with different musical genres including jazz, pop, lounge, boy band and world music (Cherokee, Bali Lounge, Nial Djuliarso at Juilliard, Tompi, Asia Beat, Bali Lounge 2, Ken, Nial - New Day New Hope, Miss Kadaluarsa, Elvyn Masassya - Titik Balik, Smash and Dewi Lestari - RectoVerso).

Wirjawan, a staunch advocate for compelling storytelling, played a pivotal role in establishing Visinema Pictures, a prominent Indonesian film production company. Notable Visinema releases include Cahaya dari Timur: Beta Maluku, the Filosofi Kopi series, Nussa, Mencuri Raden Saleh, and 13 Bom di Jakarta.

== Badminton Association of Indonesia ==
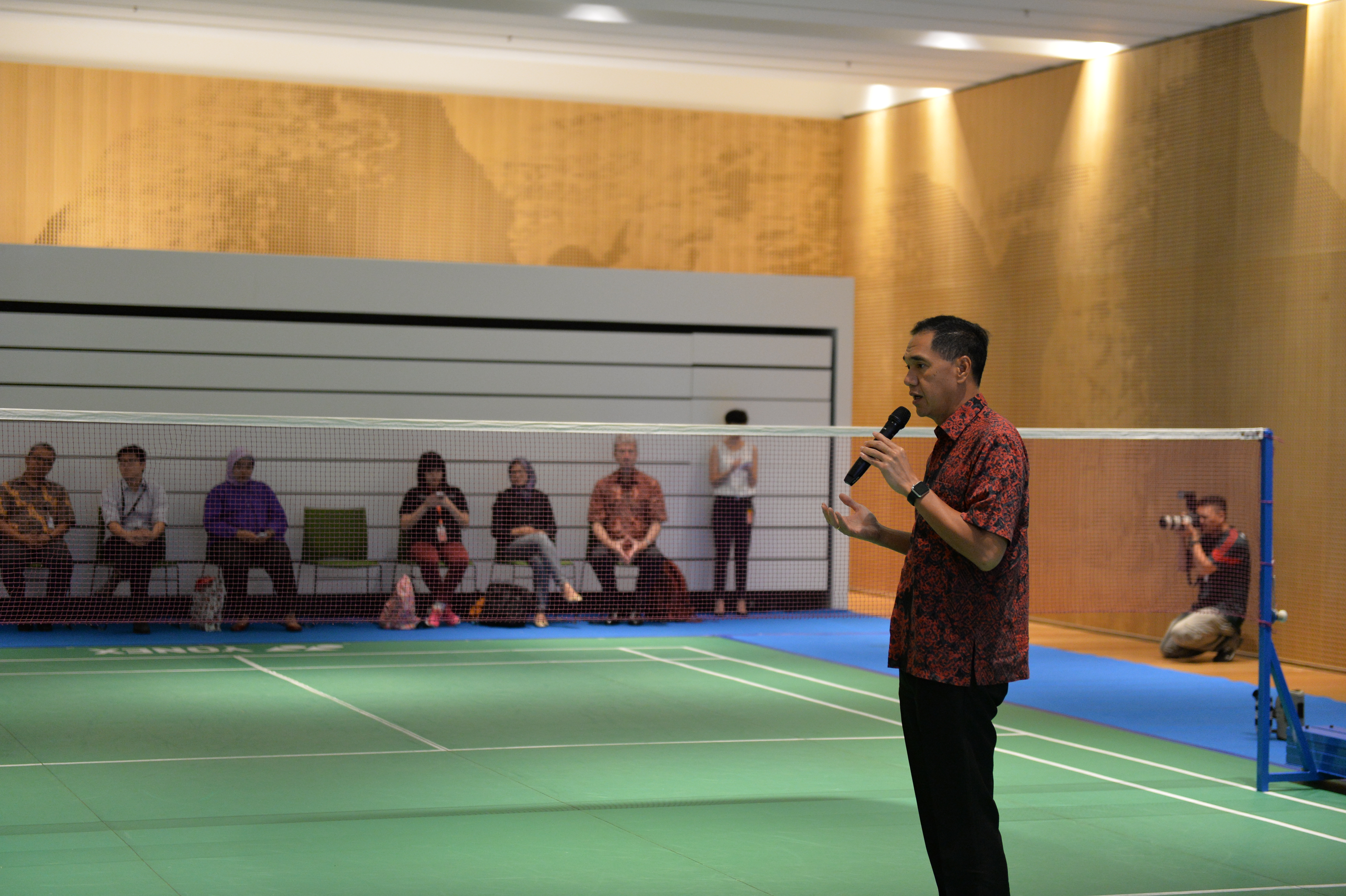
Wirjawan, then-chairman of PBSI, at the 2016 Indonesia-Australia Friendly Match.

On 14 December 2012, Wirjawan was elected as the chairman of the Indonesian Badminton Association (Persatuan Bulutangkis Seluruh Indonesia, "PBSI") for the 2012-2016 period. Wirjawan set the goal of returning Indonesia to the top ranks of badminton, as the country was in the 1970s and 1980s. He invited former Indonesian badminton legends such as Rexy Mainaky, Rudy Hartono and Tan Yoe Hok to actively engage in the organisation. To ensure the athletes can still get formal education while in training, Wirjawan set up a 'home-school' for athletes inside the training camp. Under his chairmanship, Indonesia has so far won three gold medals at the World Championships, 4 titles at the All England Championships, overall champion at the Southeast Asian Games in 2013 and 2015, 2 titles at the 2014 Asian Games in Incheon, South Korea and 1 titles Summer Olympic 2016 in Rio de Janeiro, Brazil.

== Honours and awards ==
In July 2013, Wirjawan was awarded an honorary designation of 'Sangaji Gam Ma Lamo' from the sultan of Ternate, North Molucca, Indonesia, for his role in preserving Indonesia's local customs and heritage.

He was awarded a knighthood of 'KRT Djojonegoro' from Pakualaman Palace, Yogyakarta, in January 2014 for his active contribution in maintaining the Pakualaman cultural heritage.

In October 2014, President Susilo Bambang Yudhoyono awarded him Bintang Mahaputra Adipradana in recognition of his extraordinary contribution, as a cabinet member, to his respective field that benefits the country and the nation.
