= Enggartiasto Lukita =

Indonesian politician and businessman (born 1951)

- 呂有恩
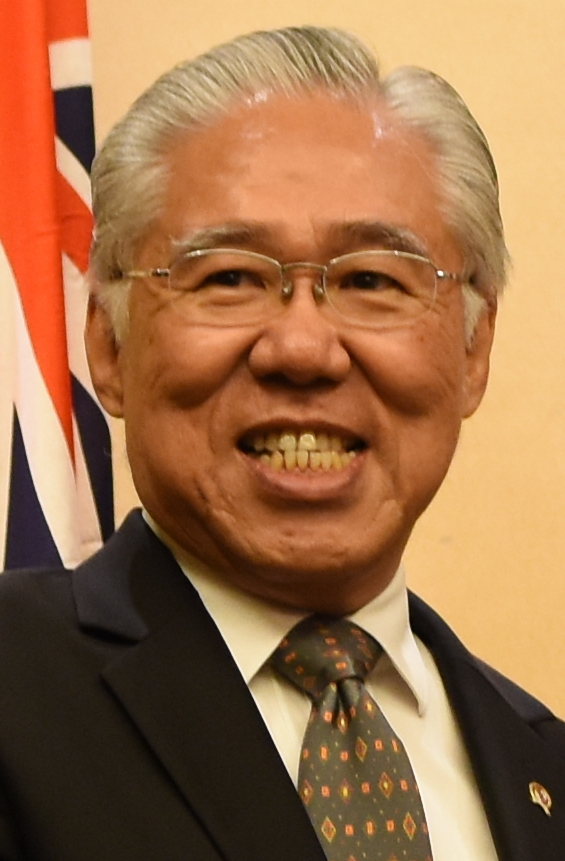

35th Minister of Trade
- In office 27 July 2016 – 20 October 2019
- President: Joko Widodo
- Preceded by: Thomas Trikasih Lembong
- Succeeded by: Agus Suparmanto

People's Consultative Assembly
- In office 1997–1999

People's Representative Council
- In office 2000–2004
- In office 2004–2009
- In office 2009–2013

Personal details
- Born: Loe Joe Eng; 12 October 1951 (age 75) Cirebon, Indonesia
- Party: Nasdem (2013–)
- Other political affiliations: Golkar (1979-2013)
- Education: Indonesia University of Education

Enggartiasto Lukita (born 12 October 1951 in Cirebon, Indonesia) is an Indonesian politician and businessman. He served as the Minister of Trade from 27 July 2016 until 23 October 2019. He was previously renown as the Chairman of Indonesian Real Estate in 1992–1995 and the member of Indonesian People's Representative Council for three terms from 2000–2004, 2004–2009, and 2009–2013 under the Golkar Party. In 2013 Enggartiasto Lukita decided to join the NasDem Party which was declared by his previous partner in Golkar, Surya Paloh. He was appointed as the Minister of Trade during President Joko Widodo's second cabinet reshuffle.

== Background ==
Enggartiasto Lukita was born Loe Joe Eng in Cirebon, West Java, on 12 October 1951. He completed studies at the English Department, Faculty of Language and Art Education, Bandung Teachers' Training College (now, Indonesia University of Education). Lukita made his entrance in politics through Indonesia People's Consultative Assembly in 1997–1999 and had then been elected as the member of Indonesian People's Representative Council for 13 years from the Golkar Party representing Cirebon and surrounding electoral district. In 2013, Lukita resigned from the House following his decision to join NasDem Party.
