= Badminton Association of Indonesia =

Indonesian sports association

- Persatuan Bulutangkis Seluruh Indonesia
- Sport: Badminton
- Jurisdiction: National
- Abbreviation: PBSI
- Founded: 5 May 1951; 75 years ago
- Affiliation: BWF
- Regional affiliation: Badminton Asia
- Headquarters: Cipayung, East Jakarta
- Chairman: Muhammad Fadil Imran

Official website
- pbsi.id
- (Indonesia)

The Badminton Association of Indonesia (Indonesian: Persatuan Bulutangkis Seluruh Indonesia; lit. 'All Indonesia Badminton Association'; abbreviated as PBSI) is the governing body of badminton in Indonesia. It was founded on 5 May 1951 in Bandung. The PBSI joined the Badminton Asia Confederation in 1959 and later on also the Badminton World Federation. The Indonesian badminton is ranked 3rd in the world according to BWF's 2020 rankings. PBSI is also the governing body of the Indonesia national badminton team.

== Tournaments ==
- Indonesia Open, an annual open tournament that attracts the world's elite players.
- Indonesia Masters
- Indonesia Masters Super 100
- Indonesia International Challenge
- Indonesia International Series
- Indonesian League

== List of General Chairmen ==
No	Name	Starting year	Ending year
1	Rochdi Partaatmadja	1951	1952
2	Sudirman	1952	1963
3	Sukamto Sayidiman	1963	1965
4	Padmo Sumasto	1965	1967
(2)	Sudirman	1967	1981
5	Ferry Sonneville	1981	1985
6	Try Sutrisno	1985	1993
7	Soerjadi	1993	1997
8	Subagyo Hadi Siswoyo	1997	2001
9	Chairul Tanjung	2001	2004
10	Sutiyoso	2004	2008
11	Djoko Santoso	2008	2012
12	Gita Wirjawan	2012	2016
13	Wiranto	2016	2020
14	Agung Firman Sampurna	2020	2024
15	Muhammad Fadil Imran	2024	2028
