= Tom Lembong =

Indonesian politician

- 汪连旺
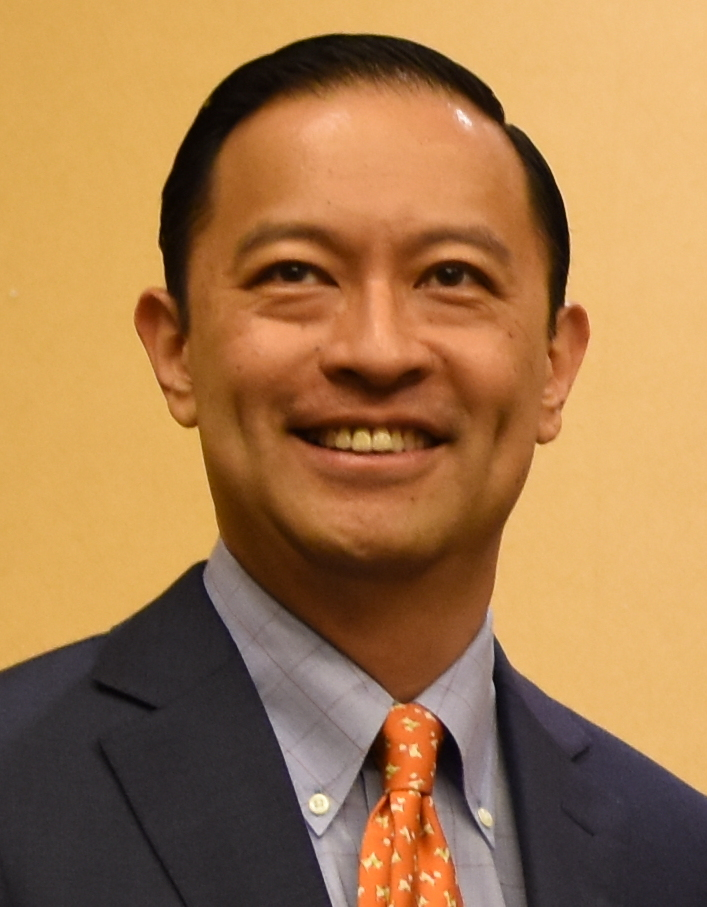
- Lembong in 2016

18th Head of Investment Coordinating Board
- In office 27 July 2016 – 23 October 2019
- President: Joko Widodo
- Preceded by: Franky Sibarani
- Succeeded by: Bahlil Lahadalia

30th Minister of Trade
- In office 12 August 2015 – 27 July 2016
- President: Joko Widodo
- Preceded by: Rachmad Gobel
- Succeeded by: Enggartiasto Lukita

Personal details
- Born: Thomas Trikasih Lembong; 4 March 1971 (age 55) Jakarta, Indonesia
- Party: Independent
- Other political affiliations: Coalition of Change for Unity
- Spouse: Maria Franciska Wihardja (m. 2002)
- Children: 2
- Parent(s): Yohannes Lembong (father); Yetty Lembong (mother)
- Education: Harvard University (AB)

Tom Lembong
- Traditional Chinese: 汪連旺
- Simplified Chinese: 汪连旺
Transcriptions
Standard Mandarin
- Hanyu Pinyin: Wāng Lián Wàng
Southern Min
- Hokkien POJ: Ong Liân Ōng

Thomas Trikasih Lembong (born 4 March 1971) is an Indonesian politician. Since 27 July 2016, he has been Head of Indonesia's Investment Coordinating Board (Badan Koordinasi Penanaman Modal). He formerly served as Minister of Trade of Indonesia from 12 August 2015 to 27 July 2016.

== Finance career ==
Main positions held by Thomas Lembong before becoming Head of the Investment Coordinating Board include the following:

- 1995: Staff member in the Equities Division in Morgan Stanley (Singapore).
- Senior Manager in the Corporate Finance Department of Makindo Securities, an investment bank in Jakarta.
- Investment banker with Deutsche Securities in Jakarta.
- 2002–2005: Division Head, and Senior Vice President, Indonesian Bank Restructuring Agency in Jakarta.
- 2006: Founding member and managing partner and CEO, Quvat Management, a private equity fund established in 2006, also working with Principia Management Group, Jakarta.
- 2008: elected as a Young Global Leader at the World Economic Forum.
- 2012: President Commissioner, PT Graha Layar Prima Tbk, an Indonesia-based cinema operator.

== Minister of Trade ==
On 12 August 2015, President Joko Widodo appointed Thomas Lembong as Minister for Trade in the first cabinet reshuffle since the Jokowi administration had taken office on 27 October 2014. Lembong held the position until he was appointed Head, Investment Coordinating Board, in July 2016. On taking over as Head of the Investment Coordinating Board, he described President Jokowi's economic reform philosophy as having two principles: openness and competition.

He emphasized that following the cabinet reshuffle and the appointment of Enggartiasto Lukita as the next Trade Minister, he expected that there would be policy continuity in trade and investment policy in Indonesia.

== Sugar import case ==
On 29 October 2024, the Attorney General's Office named Lembong as a suspect in the sugar import corruption case. The decision to bring Tom to trial was nearly 10 years after his alleged offense. The alleged offense was based on deals conducted in 2015 when Lembong was Minister of Trade in the Joko Widodo administration.

On 18 July 2025, Lembong was pronounced guilty of corruption in the sugar importation case and sentenced to four years and six months in prison. Tom Lembong was found giving import permit to several companies without coordination with Ministry of Industry, and the permit in this case should have been awarded to a state-owned company instead of private companies. He was also awarded a fine of approximately $46,000, with a subsidiary penalty of six months’ imprisonment if the fine were not paid. The panel of judges ruled that he did not personally gain from the corruption and behaved politely and did not obstruct court proceedings.

While Lembong and his legal team were preparing to appeal the verdict, President Prabowo Subianto submitted a request for abolishment of Lembong's legal process, which was approved by the House of Representatives, effectively halting the ongoing legal proceedings. After the request was granted, allowing Lembong to walk free out of the Salemba Detention Centre in Jakarta on 1 August 2025. The abolition itself did not reverse the judge's decision of Tom Lembong's corruption, and other businessmen who were involved in this case are still receiving their punishment.

== Personal life ==
Lembong married Maria Franciska Wihardja in 2002 and has two children named Thalia and Maxwell.

== Honours ==
- South Korea
  - Gwanghwa Medal of the Order of Diplomatic Service Merit (8 December 2020)

Political offices
Preceded by Rachmad Gobel	Minister of Trade; 2015–2016	Succeeded by Enggartiasto Lukita
Preceded by Franky Sibarani	Head of Indonesian Investment Coordinating Board; 2016–2019	Succeeded by Bahlil Lahadalia
