= Sudirman Cup =

Badminton championships

- Current season, competition or edition: 2025 Sudirman Cup
- Sport: Badminton
- Founded: 1989
- No. of teams: 16 (finals)
- Countries: BWF member nations
- Most recent champion: China (14th title)
- Most titles: China (14 titles)

The Sudirman Cup is an international badminton mixed team competition contested by member countries of the Badminton World Federation, the sport's global governing body. The championship has been awarded every two years since the inaugural tournament in 1989. It used to be held at the same venue for the World Championships in the same year until the International Badminton Federation, now the BWF, decided to split the two tournaments starting from 2003. There are five matches in every Sudirman Cup tie which consists of men and women's singles, men and women's doubles, and mixed doubles. The cup is named after Sudirman (1922–1986), a former Indonesian badminton player. The current champion is China, which won its 14th title at the 2025 tournament in China.

There is no prize money in Sudirman Cup; players play for their respective countries and to earn BWF World Ranking points and national prestige.

== Trophy ==
The Sudirman Cup stands 80 cm high. It is made of 22 carat (92%) gold-plated solid silver and stands on an octagonal base made of jati wood (Java teak wood). The body of the Cup is in the form of a shuttlecock and is surmounted by a replica of the Borobudur Temple. The handles are in the shape of stamens, symbolising the seeds of badminton.

The Cup was made by Masterix Bandung Company at the price of US$15,000.

== Format ==
Until the 2021 edition, Sudirman Cup was an international competition that does not stage a qualification round. The competing teams are divided into 7 groups based on their performances. Only teams in Group 1 will have a chance to lift the trophy as the teams in other groups fight for promotion. Only six teams compete in Group 1, before it is increased to 8 in 2005 and further increased to 12 teams in 2011. Originally, the teams who finish last in the group were relegated to the lower group for the next edition, except for the last place finishing team in the lowest group. The promotion-relegation system was last used in 2009, and teams competing are now grouped by world rankings.

Starting from 2021 a new 16 team competition format is used, consisting of teams qualified from continental mixed team championships and mixed team ranking. However, due to travel and border restrictions arising from the ongoing COVID-19 pandemic affecting the other planned continental team championships, the new format was only able to be fully implemented in 2023 edition.

== Results ==
Year	Host	Final			Semi-finalists
Year	Host	Champions	Score	Runners-up	Semi-finalists
1989; Details	Jakarta, Indonesia	Indonesia	3–2	South Korea	China	Denmark
1991; Details	Copenhagen, Denmark	South Korea	3–2	Indonesia	China	Denmark
1993; Details	Birmingham, England	South Korea	3–2	Indonesia	China	Denmark
1995; Details	Lausanne, Switzerland	China	3–1	Indonesia	Denmark	South Korea
1997; Details	Glasgow, Scotland	China	5–0	South Korea	Denmark	Indonesia
1999; Details	Copenhagen, Denmark	China	3–1	Denmark	Indonesia	South Korea
2001; Details	Seville, Spain	China	3–1	Indonesia	Denmark	South Korea
2003; Details	Eindhoven, Netherlands	South Korea	3–1	China	Denmark	Indonesia
2005; Details	Beijing, China	China	3–0	Indonesia	Denmark	South Korea
2007; Details	Glasgow, Scotland	China	3–0	Indonesia	England	South Korea
2009; Details	Guangzhou, China	China	3–0	South Korea	Indonesia	Malaysia
2011; Details	Qingdao, China	China	3–0	Denmark	Indonesia	South Korea
2013; Details	Kuala Lumpur, Malaysia	China	3–0	South Korea	Denmark	Thailand
2015; Details	Dongguan, China	China	3–0	Japan	Indonesia	South Korea
2017; Details	Gold Coast, Australia	South Korea	3–2	China	Japan	Thailand
2019; Details	Nanning, China	China	3–0	Japan	Indonesia	Thailand
2021; Details	Vantaa, Finland	China	3–1	Japan	South Korea	Malaysia
2023; Details	Suzhou, China	China	3–0	South Korea	Malaysia	Japan
2025; Details	Xiamen, China	China	3–1	South Korea	Indonesia	Japan
2027; Details	Beijing, China

=== Location ===
Host cities of the Sudirman Cup (Asia)
Host cities of the Sudirman Cup (Europe)
Host cities of the Sudirman Cup (rest of the world)

== Successful national teams ==
Indonesia initially won the tournament in 1989. Throughout the history of the tournament, eight countries have reached through to the semifinal round in all tournaments of Sudirman Cup: China, Denmark, England, Indonesia, Korea, Malaysia, Thailand and Japan.

China is the most successful national team in the Sudirman Cup (14 victories), followed by Korea (4 victories) and Indonesia (1 victory). The tournament has never been won by a non-Asian country, Denmark is the only European country that came close to winning it, in 1999 and 2011.

Bold text denotes team was host country.

Team	Champions	Runners-up	Semi-finalists	Top 4 total
China	14 (1995, 1997, 1999, 2001, **2005**, 2007, **2009**, **2011**, 2013, **2015**, **2019**, 2021, **2023**, **2025**)	2 (2003, 2017)	3 (1989, 1991, 1993)	19
South Korea	4 (1991, 1993, 2003, 2017)	6 (1989, 1997, 2009, 2013, 2023, 2025)	8 (1995, 1999, 2001, 2005, 2007, 2011, 2015, 2021)	18
Indonesia	1 (**1989**)	6 (1991, 1993, 1995, 2001, 2005, 2007)	8 (1997, 1999, 2003, 2009, 2011, 2015, 2019, 2025)	15
Japan	—N/a	3 (2015, 2019, 2021)	3 (2017, 2023, 2025)	6
Denmark	—N/a	2 (**1999**, 2011)	9 (1989, **1991**, 1993, 1995, 1997, 2001, 2003, 2005, 2013)	11
Thailand	—N/a	—N/a	3 (2013, 2017, 2019)	3
Malaysia	—N/a	—N/a	3 (2009, 2021, 2023)	3
England	—N/a	—N/a	1 (2007)	1
