= Dick Sudirman =

Indonesian badminton player

Personal information
- Born: April 29, 1922
- Died: June 10, 1986 (aged 64)

Sport
- Country: Indonesia
- Sport: Badminton
- Handedness: Right

Dick Sudirman (29 April 1922 – 10 June 1986) was an Indonesian badminton player.

He was also the founder of Badminton Association of Indonesia (PBSI) as well as its chairman for 22 years (1952–1963 and 1967–1981). He was also the vice president of IBF in 1975.

His surname "Sudirman" is used for the Sudirman Cup, the world mixed team badminton championship.
