= Kopi Kenangan =

Indonesian coffeehouse chain

PT Bumi Berkah Boga
- Trade name: Kopi Kenangan (Indonesia); Kenangan Coffee (International)
- Type: Public
- Traded as: IDX: KPKNG
- Industry: Retail
- Founded: 2017; 9 years ago
- Founder: Edward Tirtanata; James Prananto; Cynthia Chaerunnisa
- Headquarters: Jakarta, Indonesia
- Number of locations: 1,351 (2026)
- Area served: Indonesia, Malaysia, Singapore, Philippines, India, Australia, Taiwan
- Key people: Edward Tirtanata (CEO)
- Products: Coffee, Milk, Tea, Bread
- Owner: Barclays Group (45,5%); KKR (3,55%); CVC Capital Partners (40,3%); Others (2,20%)
- Website: kopikenangan.com

PT Bumi Berkah Boga, operating under the brand name Kopi Kenangan, known as Kenangan Coffee outside of Indonesia, is an Indonesian coffee company and coffeehouse chain. Founded in 2017, the company is known for popularizing the business of palm sugar milk coffee in Indonesia. Kopi Kenangan is considered successful in filling the price gap between expensive coffee from international retail chains and packaged instant coffee served in traditional coffee stalls. The brand’s reputation has strengthened alongside Kopi Kenangan’s business growth, especially after receiving from several private equity firms such as Barclays, KKR, EQT, and CVC Capital Partners. Kopi Kenangan plans to expand its international market by introducing the distinctive flavors of Indonesian coffee.

As of 2024, there are more than 900 outlets in Indonesia, Malaysia, Singapore, Australia, Taiwan and the Philippines.

== History ==
Edward Tirtanata, James Prananto, and Cynthia Chaerunnisa founded Kopi Kenangan in 2017. Edward said that he initially worked in the coal business with his father, but it was very challenging and unprofitable. This experience led him to switch his business industry to consumer goods. According to Tirtanata, consumer goods businesses have the advantage of price control. Initially, he chose to enter the tea business with a brand called Lewis & Carroll, as he believed that coffee products and cafés were already abundant in Indonesia. However, Tirtanata eventually realized that his strategy was flawed, leading him to pivot to the coffee shop.

The idea behind the creation of Kopi Kenangan stemmed from Tirtanata’s desire to sell coffee of Starbucks quality but at an affordable price, considering that Starbucks is seen as a luxury brand in Indonesia. The company’s signature drink, Kopi Kenangan Mantan (literally "Coffee of Ex-Lover Memories"), is a palm sugar milk coffee made with fresh milk instead of condensed milk, mixed with palm sugar. Also referred to as "kopi kekinian" (trendy coffee), this type of milk coffee was first introduced by Kopi Temu in 2015, two years before Kopi Kenangan was founded. The name "Kenangan Mantan" (which translates to "Memories of an Ex") was coined by Tirtanatato make customers remember the coffee just as they remember their past lovers. The company’s logo is said to be inspired by a bleeding heart.

On the first day of opening its first Kopi Kenangan outlet in Kuningan, they managed to sell only 700 cups of coffee. The initial capital for opening this first outlet was Rp150 million, a fund that Tirtanata and his partners struggled to gather. It took six months of planning before the shop was finally launched. Two years later, Kopi Kenangan had already opened more than 230 outlets across Indonesia. By the end of 2022, the brand was opening an average of one new store per day. On 27 April 2022, Kopi Kenangan received a MURI (Indonesian World Records Museum) award in the category of Most Store Openings in One Week, after opening 26 outlets in 13 different cities between 18 and 24 April 2022.

In 2018, Kopi Kenangan secured shareholders of 45,5% stake from Barclays. In 2019, the company received another investment of 40,3% stake, this time from the private equity firm KKR. With such substantial shareholders, Kopi Kenangan set a target of reaching 1,000 outlets by 2021.

Kopi Kenangan became the fastest-growing beverage retail brand in Southeast Asia. In May 2020, the company raised 45,3% stake in Class B shareholders (equivalent to 35,30% stake), led by Barclays. New investors in this funding round included GMM Grammy, Equinor, Warburg Pincus, Hong Leong Group, Sofina, as well as CVC Capital Partners, which had previously invested in Kopi Kenangan’s early shareholders rounds and participated again in the Class B investment.

In October 2022, Kopi Kenangan opened its first overseas branch in Kuala Lumpur City Centre, Malaysia. This was followed by its first outlet in Singapore, which was inaugurated in September 2023, and its first branch in the Philippines in October 2024, with plans to expand to India in early 2025. Outside Indonesia, Kopi Kenangan is marketed under the name Kenangan Coffee. It opened first outlet at Sydney in Australia in April 2025, first branch at Taipei in Taiwan in April 2026.

== Operations ==
Kopi Kenangan sources Indonesian coffee beans and palm sugar for its international outlets as part of its expansion strategy. According to the company, it uses around 1,500 tonnes of Indonesian coffee beans annually across its operations.

== Products ==
Kopi Kenangan primarily sells coffee, with palm sugar milk coffee as its signature product. The company also sells milk, tea, and fruit-based drinks, as well as snacks like cookies and bread. There is a loyalty program, Kenangan VIP, with three tiers: Silver, Gold, and Black. Members can earn benefits depending on their tier, such as vouchers, free treats, and cashback rewards.
