= Rosan Roeslani =

Indonesian politician

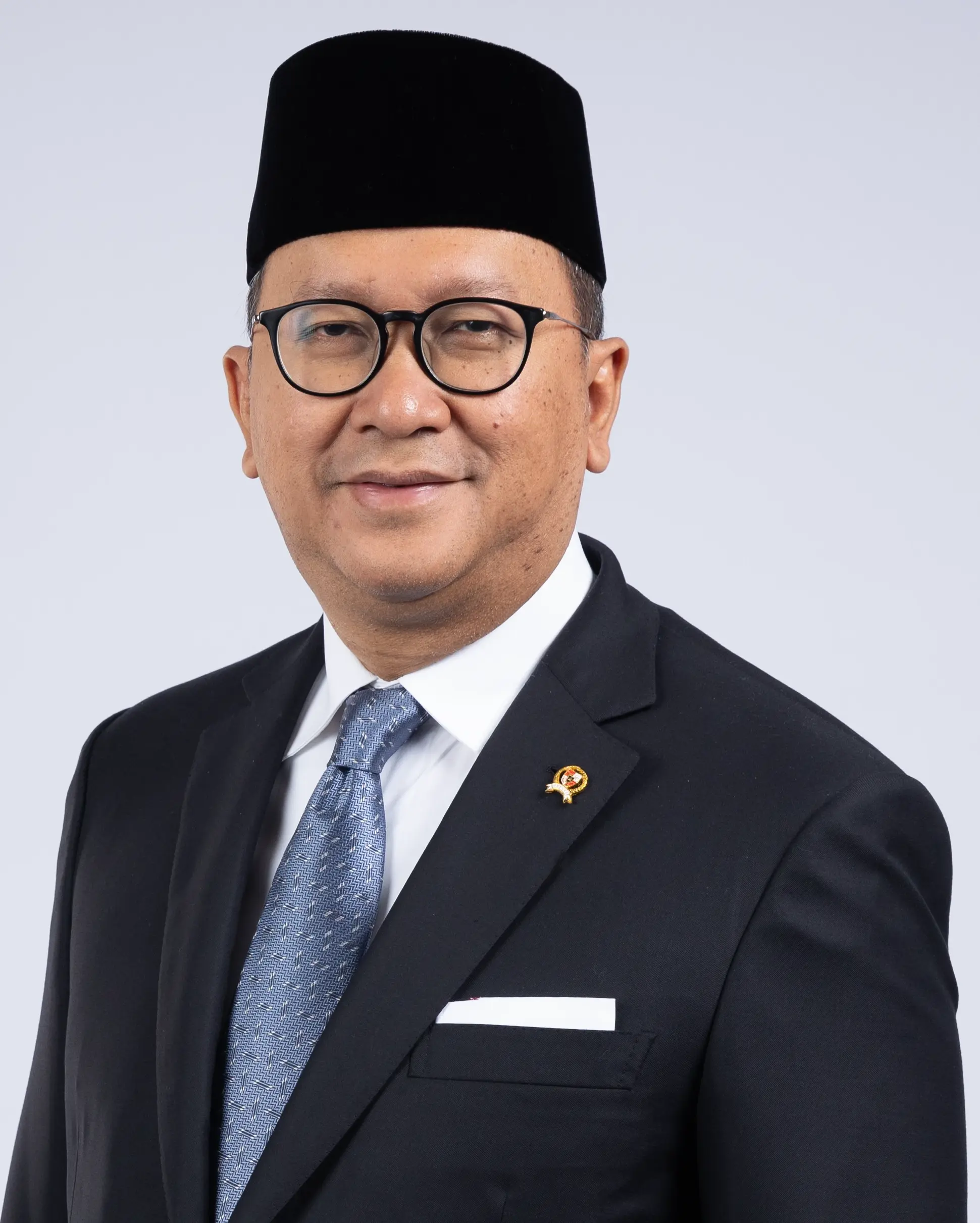
- Official portrait, 2024

7th Minister of Investment and Downstream Policy
- Incumbent
- Assumed office 19 August 2024
- President: Joko Widodo; Prabowo Subianto
- Preceded by: Bahlil Lahadalia

1st Head of Danantara Indonesia
- Incumbent
- Assumed office 24 February 2025
- President: Prabowo Subianto
- Preceded by: Office established

4th Deputy Minister of State-Owned Enterprises
- In office 17 July 2023 – 25 October 2023
- President: Joko Widodo
- Preceded by: Pahala Mansury

21st Ambassador of Indonesia to the United States
- In office 25 October 2021 – 17 July 2023
- President: Joko Widodo
- Preceded by: Muhammad Lutfi
- Succeeded by: Indroyono Soesilo

10th Chairperson of Kadin Indonesia
- In office 2015 – 7 July 2021
- Deputy: Anindya Novyan Bakrie
- Preceded by: Suryo Bambang Sulisto
- Succeeded by: Arsjad Rasjid

Personal details
- Born: December 31, 1968 (age 57) Jakarta, Indonesia
- Party: Independent
- Spouse: Ayu Menik Heni
- Children: 3
- Education: University of Antwerp; Oklahoma State University
- Occupation: Politician; businessman

Rosan Perkasa Roeslani (born 31 December 1968) is an Indonesian politician, diplomat and businessman. He served as Minister for Investment from August to October 2024. He was formerly the Indonesian Ambassador to the United States from 2021 until 2023, the former Deputy Minister of State-Owned Enterprises in 2023, and the former Chairperson of the Indonesian Chamber of Commerce and Industry from 2015 until 7 July 2021.

== Business career ==
=== Early career ===
Together with his two friends, Sandiaga Uno and Elvin Ramli, Rosan started his business as financial advisors. The business that was started in 1996 was officially established into a company in 1997 under the name PT Republik Indonesia Funding, which is better known as Finance Indonesia. The entrepreneurial segment, which was scorned by a number of people, finally yielded sweet results. The economic crisis that has hit Indonesia since the end of '97 requires national companies to look for people who are able to revive the companies and businesses they manage. The crisis turned into a blessing for Rosan. Starting from a small office with an area of 70 square meters in Setiabudi area, Kuningan, South Jakarta, Finance Indonesia began to take the attention of large capital owners.

=== Finance ===
In 2002, Indonesia Finance changed its name to Recapital. From a small financial advisory firm, Recapital has become a large company present in the areas of strategic cooperation, financial asset management and investors. "One time we were chatting, we could bring in investors to help unhealthy companies. Why don't we bring in investors for our company too?" said Rosan. With finance and banking as the leading sectors, Recapital's business is growing by entering other sectors in the industrial sector where mining, infrastructure, property, to media and communications are included. In the financial sector, Recapital is present through Recapital Securities, Recapital Asset Management, Global Sarana Lintas Artha, Recapital Life Insurance (Relife), Recapital General Insurance (Reguard), and Bank Pundi.

=== Infrastructure ===
In the infrastructure sector, Rosan's company is one of the leaders in Indonesia through the Acuatico Group in the supply and distribution of clean water.

=== Media ===
In the field of Media and Telecommunications, Recapital is present through Alberta Media.

=== Mining ===
In the mining sector, the name Recapital emerged as one of the shareholders of Bumi Plc. One of its subsidiaries is Berau Coal Energy. However Asia Resource Minerals (formerly Bumi plc), which was at the center of a prolonged media war between its disputing shareholders, was dissolved in 2017.

=== Sports ===
He is one of three Indonesians who bought the Italian football club Inter Milan in 2015.

== Advocacy career ==
=== Chamber of Commerce (KADIN) ===
As he grew older and became more influential, Rosan was elected to the board of the Indonesian Chamber of Commerce and Industry (KADIN) for the 2010-2015 period. According to his field of expertise, Rosan was entrusted as Deputy General Chair of Banking and Finance. One of Rosan's real and aspirational works in carrying out this position is the establishment of PT Palapa Nusantara Berdikari. This company aims to help financing potential SMEs throughout the archipelago through capital.

On November 24, 2015, he was elected as Chairman of Kadin for the period 2015 - 2020. He won 102 votes, beating another candidate for chairman, Rahmat Gobel, who only got 27 votes at the VII Kadin National Conference at the Trans Luxury Hotel, Bandung, West Java. The total votes collected reached 129 votes, consisting of 33 regional Chamber of Commerce and Industry (Kadin) in which each province had 3 voting rights and 30 associations, each of which had 1 vote.

== Honours ==
- Belgium:
  - Commander of the Order of Leopold (2017)
- United Kingdom:
  - Honorary Officer of the Order of British Empire (OBE)
  - Honorary Member of the Order of British Empire (MBE)
