= Indonesian Chamber of Commerce and Industry =

Non-profit organization

- Kamar Dagang dan Industri Indonesia
- Coat of arms of Kadin
- Abbreviation: Kadin Indonesia
- Formation: 24 September 1968; 58 years ago
- Founders: Usman Ismail; Sofjar; Soewoto Sukendar
- Type: Non-governmental trade association
- Purpose: Policy advocacy
- Headquarters: Menara Kadin, Jalan HR. Rasuna Said X-5 Kav 2–3, Jakarta, Indonesia
- Coordinates: 6.232365°S 106.831701°E
- Region served: Worldwide
- Services: Business promotion, networking, policy reforms
- Chairman: Anindya Bakrie
- Website: www.kadinindonesia.or.id

The Indonesian Chamber of Commerce and Industry (Indonesian: Kamar Dagang dan Industri Indonesia) or Kadin is an association of business organisations in Indonesia. Members of this organisation consist of entrepreneurs or a combination of national businesses from various sectors, both private-owned enterprises, cooperatives and government-owned enterprises. Kadin is headquartered in Jakarta, but it functions in coordinating, consultation and cooperation of chambers of commerce throughout Indonesia.

The organisation was founded on 24 September 1968 and regulated in Act No. 1 of 1987.

== History ==
The formation Kadin was on 24 September 1968 by the Level I Regional Kadin or Level I Kadinda (the term for the Provincial Kadin at that time) that existed throughout Indonesia on the initiative of the DKI Jakarta Kadin, and was recognised by the government with Presidential Decree No. 49 in 1973. It was re-established in accordance with the provisions of Law Number 1 of 1987 concerning the Chamber of Commerce and Industry in the Indonesian Employers' Conference on 12 August 1994 in Jakarta organised by Indonesian Businessmen incorporated in the Indonesian Chamber of Commerce and Industry in cooperation with the Indonesian Cooperative Council (Dekopin) and representatives are established for an unspecified period of time.

== List of Chairmen of KADIN ==
The tenure of Chairman of Kadin is five years. Before 1993, the tenure of chairman was three years. Here are the names that were once the Chairperson:

No	Name	Start date	End date	Info
1	Usman Ismail	1968	1972	
2	Sofyar	1972	1973	
3	Soewoto Sukendar	1973	1976	
3	Soewoto Sukendar	1976	1979	
4	Hasyim Ning	1979	1982	
5	Sukamdani Sahid Gitosardjono	1982	1985	
5	Sukamdani Sahid Gitosardjono	1985	1988	
6	Sotion Arjanggi	1988	1993	
7	Aburizal Bakrie	1993	1998	
7	Aburizal Bakrie	1998	2003	
8	Mohamad Suleman Hidayat	2003	2008	
8	Mohamad Suleman Hidayat	2008	2010	
9	Adi Putra Darmawan Tahir	2010	2010	
10	Suryo Bambang Sulisto	2010	2015	
11	Rosan Perkasa Roeslani	2015	2021	
12	Arsjad Rasjid	2021	2025	
13	Anindya Bakrie	2025		

== See also ==
- Chamber of commerce
