= Bahlil Lahadalia =

Indonesian businessman and politician

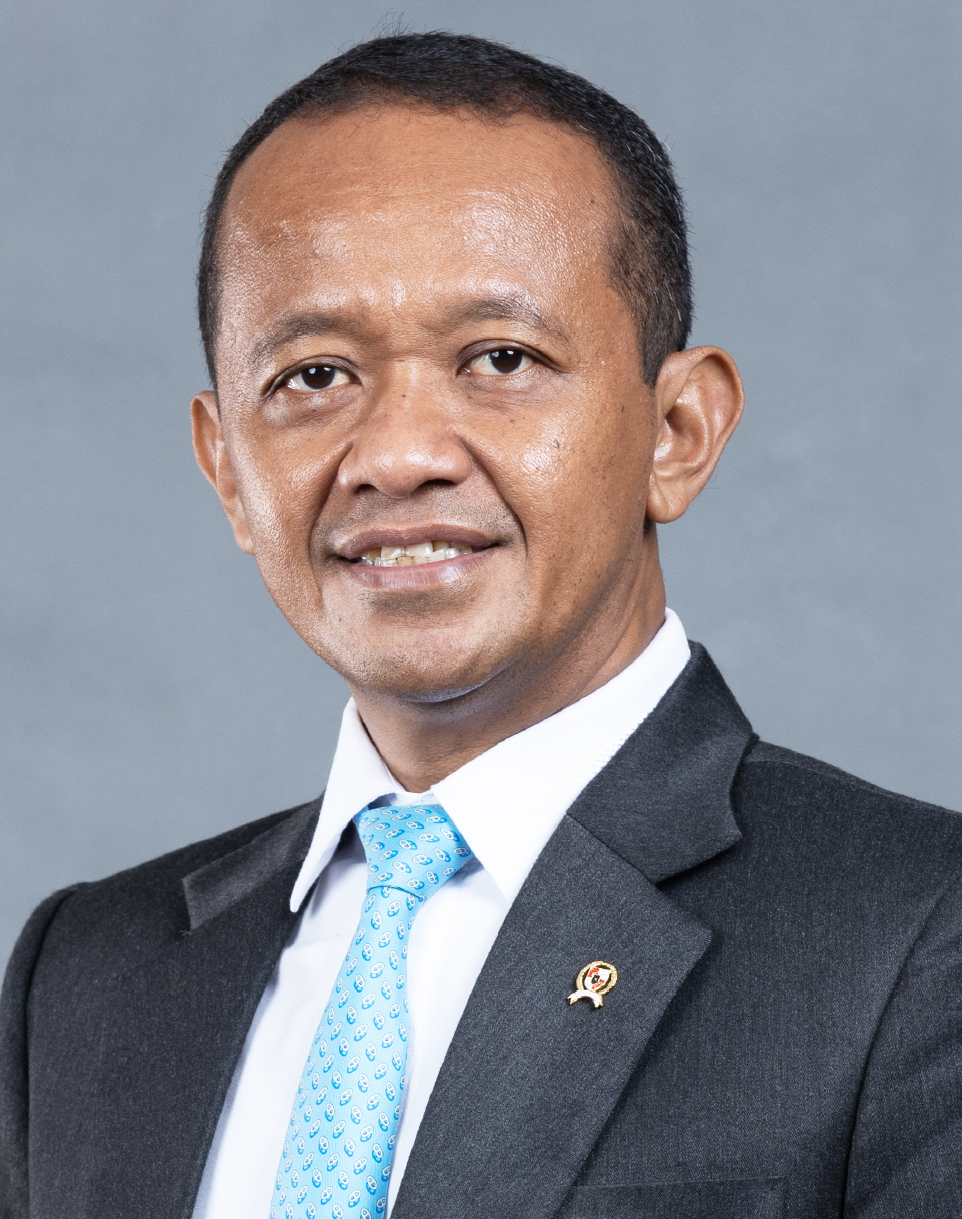
- Official portrait, 2023

19th Minister of Energy and Mineral Resources
- Incumbent
- Assumed office 19 August 2024
- President: Joko Widodo; Prabowo Subianto
- Deputy: Yuliot Tanjung
- Preceded by: Arifin Tasrif

6th Minister of Investment
- In office 28 April 2021 – 19 August 2024
- President: Joko Widodo
- Preceded by: M. Rozy Munir
- Succeeded by: Rosan Roeslani

Chair of Investment Coordinating Board
- In office 23 October 2019 – 19 August 2024
- President: Joko Widodo
- Preceded by: Thomas Trikasih Lembong
- Succeeded by: Rosan Roeslani

12th General Chairman of Golkar
- Incumbent
- Assumed office 21 August 2024
- Preceded by: Airlangga Hartarto; Agus Gumiwang Kartasasmita (acting)

Personal details
- Born: 7 August 1976 (age 49) Banda, Central Maluku, Indonesia
- Party: Golkar
- Spouse: Sri Suparni
- Education: STIE Port Numbay (S.E.); Cenderawasih University (M.Si.); University of Indonesia (Dr)
- Occupation: Politician; Businessman

Bahlil Lahadalia (born 7 August 1976) is an Indonesian businessman and politician serving since August 2024 as Indonesia's Minister of Energy and Mineral Resources. Previously, he served as the Minister of Investment from April 2021 to August 2024, concurrently as head of the Indonesian Investment Coordinating Board (BKPM), which he had served since October 2019. He has also been the Leader of the Golkar party since 21 August 2024, replacing Airlangga Hartanto.

== Early life and education ==
Lahadalia was born in Maluku, where he also received most of his elementary to junior high school education, before moving to Fakfak (where his father is from) for high school. He studied economics in Jayapura at Port Numbay Jayapura College of Economics, a local private college. He graduated late at the age of 26 years old, as revealed at a guest lecture at the University of Brawijaya, due to an interruption in his education due to his involvement in the May 1998 riots.

During his time as a student, he was active in the Muslim Students' Association in Papua, and eventually reached the position of General Treasurer of the National Leadership at the association.

Lahadalia attended his doctoral studies at Universitas Indonesia's Sekolah Kajian Stratejik dan Global (School of Global and Strategics Studies) until October 2024, graduating in just twenty months, the fastest doctorate ever granted by the school. This garnered national controversy and prompted an ethics enquiry from the university's council of professors and deans.

== Personal life ==
Lahadalia is married to Sri Suparni. They have three sons, Muhammad Rizky Lahadalia, Muhammad Fadli, and Emir Ramadhan (born 2011).

== Business career ==
His first job was a cake seller during his pre-teen years. He later became a bus conductor as a teenager, and eventually a public transportation driver while in senior high school. Years later, after he had graduated from Port Numbay, he was hired as a worker of Sucofindo, a state-run company. He later founded the companies PT Rifa Capital, PT Bersama Papua Unggul, and PT Dwijati Sukses with his friends.

He currently owns the PT Rifa Capital Holding Company and 10 other companies, and is mostly active in the transportation and property sectors.

At some point in time as a businessman, he met and befriended Joko Widodo, who at the time was also a fellow businessman. They had a very close friendship, and Widodo considered Lahadalia a brother.

== Political career ==
=== Early career ===
During the 2019 Indonesian presidential election, Lahadalia supported Joko Widodo for his run for second term of his presidency. He became the Director of the Directorate for the Raising Young Voters of the Joko Widodo - Ma'ruf Amin presidential campaign team. and the National Campaign Team of the Working Indonesia Coalition..

=== Minister of Investment ===
For his work in defending the presidency of Joko Widodo in his campaign, he was appointed the head of the BKPM (Indonesian: Badan Koordinasi Penanaman Modal, English: Indonesia Investment Coordinating Board). on October 2019 He was sworn in as Indonesia's first minister of investment on the 28th of April 2021, following the creation of the Ministry of Investment.

=== Minister of Energy and Mineral Resources ===
On the 4th of February 2022, it was announced that effective the day before, Lahadalia would be the ad interim Minister of Energy and Mineral Resources, replacing Arifin Tasrif due to an undisclosed health issue. It was later revealed that Tasrif had been infected with COVID-19, and that the change of leadership was only temporary.

=== Controversies ===
On the 1st of February 2025, Lahadalia, now the Minister of Energy and Mineral Resources implemented a policy that restricted the sale of subsidized 3-kg Liquefied Petroleum Gas (LPG) Cylinders to official distributors. This policy aimed to tighten oversight and ensure that subsidies reached their intended beneficiaries. However, the abrupt change led to widespread public frustration due to subsequent long queues and great difficulty in accessing the cooking gas. An elderly woman died of exhaustion while waiting for a line to buy the LPG cylinders.

Lahadalia received major backlash due to this, and Indonesian President Prabowo Subianto instructed Lahadalia to allow retailers to resume sales of the subsidized 3-kg LPG cylinders. A directive was then issued on February 4, 2025 to alleviate the public's difficulty in obtaining the cooking gas. Following this, the government initiated measures to convert approximately 375,000 retailers into official sub-distribution centers, aiming to enhance transparency and control over the distribution system, prevent price manipulation, and ensure subsidies reached the intended recipients.

Lahadalia acknowledged the public's struggles during the policy's initial implementation and extended an apology for the inconveniences caused, and emphasized the government's commitment to improving the distribution system to prevent future disruptions.

== In popular culture ==
Lahadalia, as Minister of Energy and Mineral Resources, is often ridiculed by the general public. Voted the 46th rated minister out of 46 ministers rated in a survey by CELIOS, Lahadalia is often the target of widespread online memes making fun of his likeness, which his supporters in Golkar's 'Golkar Party Youth' and 'Young Generation for Indonesian Renewal' youth wing claim to be defamatory and racist, describing them as "excessive", and even filing lawsuits to the POLRI's Polda Metro Jaya and the Bareskrim Polri respectively on 20 October 2025. 4 days later, Lahadalia made a statement, exclaiming that he has been ridiculed since his youth and is "used to" it, and pushed for the lawsuits to be withdrawn.

In late May 2026, the media was boomed with the viral song "Kanda My Little Bolu Ketan" by a user named VOKALIZ_NETIZEN. The song includes the lines "My Little Bolu Ketan", "MBG = Mas Bahlil Ganteng", and more. It made Lahadalia curious about the songwriter and wants to invite him for a dinner.

== Awards and honors ==
- Indonesia
  - Star of Mahaputera (2nd Class) (Indonesian: Bintang Mahaputera Adipradana) (14 August 2024)
