= Anindya Bakrie =

Indonesian businessman (born 1974)

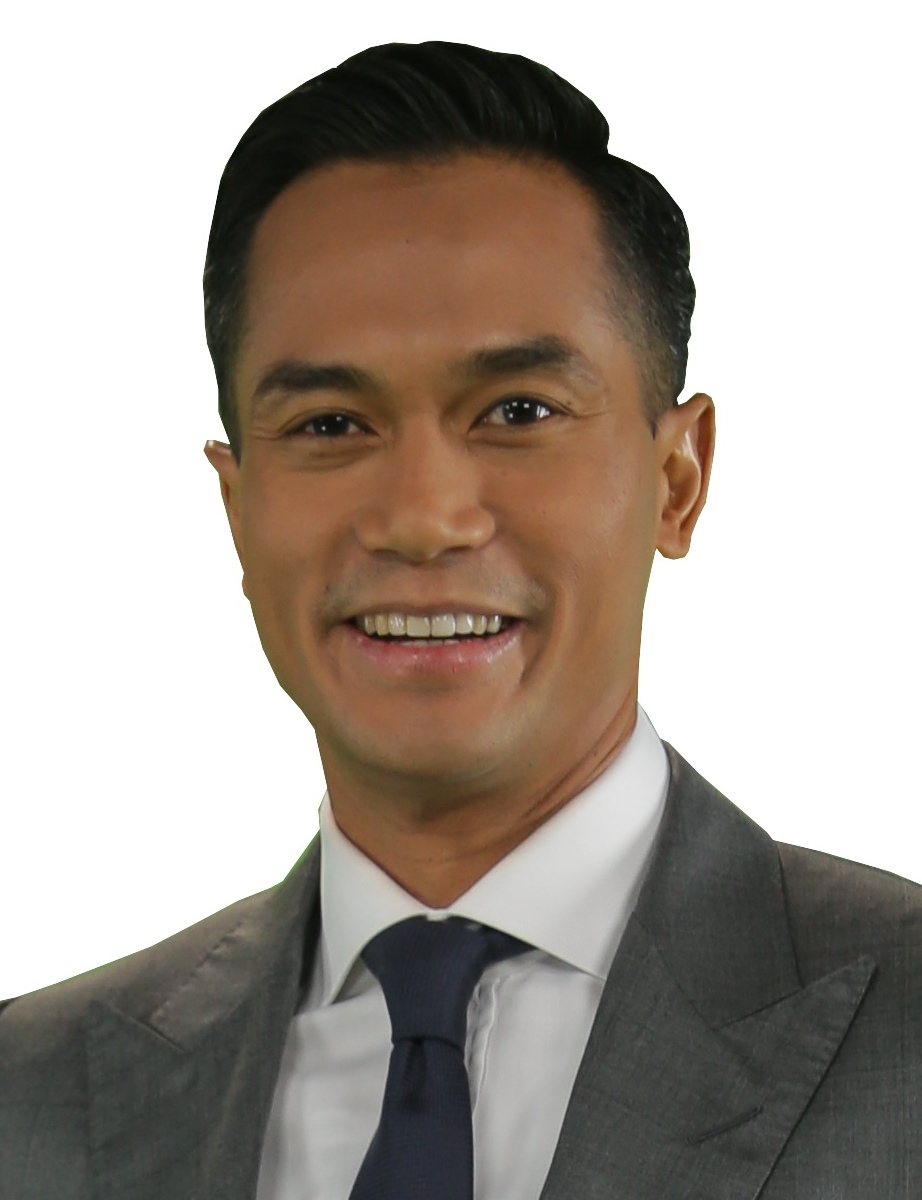
- Official portrait, 2021
- Born: Anindya Novyan Bakrie; 10 November 1974 (age 51); Jakarta, Indonesia
- Education: Northwestern University (BS); Stanford University (MBA)
- Occupation: Businessperson
- Title: CEO and President of Bakrie & Brothers; Chairman of the Indonesian Chamber of Commerce and Industry; Co-owner and Director of Oxford United
- Spouse: Firdani Saugi
- Children: 3
- Parent(s): Aburizal Bakrie (father); Tatty Murnitriati (mother)
- Website: https://www.aninbakrie.com/

Anindya Novyan Bakrie (English: /ænɪndɪə nˈɑːvɪən bˈækɹi/, Indonesian pronunciation: [aˌnindja ˌnɔfjan ˈbakri]) (born 10 November 1974), is an Indonesian business entrepreneur, investor and philanthropist. He is also a heavy investor in the Indonesian electric bus industry.

He is also the chairman of APEC Business Advisory Council (ABAC) Indonesia, and holds a shareholder majority of English Championship club Oxford United, is the chairman of VKTR Teknologi Mobilitas, and the founder and CEO of the Visi Media Asia (VIVA) Group, which operates television news and sports channel TVOne,and is also the founder of the Bakrie Center Foundation.

Bakrie was appointed Chairman of the Indonesian Chamber of Commerce and Industry (KADIN) for the 2024–2029 term, He is now currently the CEO of Bakrie & Brothers, which operates under the Bakrie Group, which is one of the oldest and largest family-owned conglomerates in Indonesia.

== Early life and education ==
Bakrie was born in Jakarta, Indonesia, on 10 November 1974, the elder son of Aburizal Bakrie. He is the eldest grandson of Achmad Bakrie, who founded Bakrie Group in 1942.

He earned his BSc in industrial engineering at Northwestern University (NU) in 1996, before earning a Master's degree from the Global Management Program at Stanford Graduate School of Business in 2001.

== Career ==
Bakrie began his career as an investment banker at Salomon Brothers, Wall Street, in the United States in 1996. In 1997, his father, Aburizal Bakrie, asked him to return to Indonesia following the 1998 riots. After receiving his MBA from Stanford, he served as Deputy to Chief Operating Officer and Managing Director of Bakrie & Brothers.

He has had several high-level positions in various companies which include General Chair of the Indonesian Chamber of Commerce and Industry (KADIN) for the 2024-2029 term, Chairman of APEC Business Advisory Council (ABAC) Indonesia, and Chairman of the ASEAN Business Advisory Council (ASEAN-BAC).

=== Media industry ===
Bakrie has also been involved in the media industry being the main commissioner of Cakrawala Andalas Televisi (ANTV) and main director of PT Bakrie Telecom from December 2003 to January 2012 for the latter.

In 2007, he acquired a second TV station, Lativi Media Karya, from businessman and former Minister of Manpower, Abdul Latief. The station was then renamed to TV One in 2008.

In 2011, Bakrie collaborated with Erick Thohir to acquire VIVA.

=== Football club ownership ===
In September 2022, along with Erick Thohir, Bakrie bought a 51% share in English football club Oxford United.

== Personal life ==
Bakrie married Firdani Saugi and has three children.
