= Ministry of Investment and Downstream Industry =

Indonesian government ministry

- Kementerian Investasi dan Hilirisasi
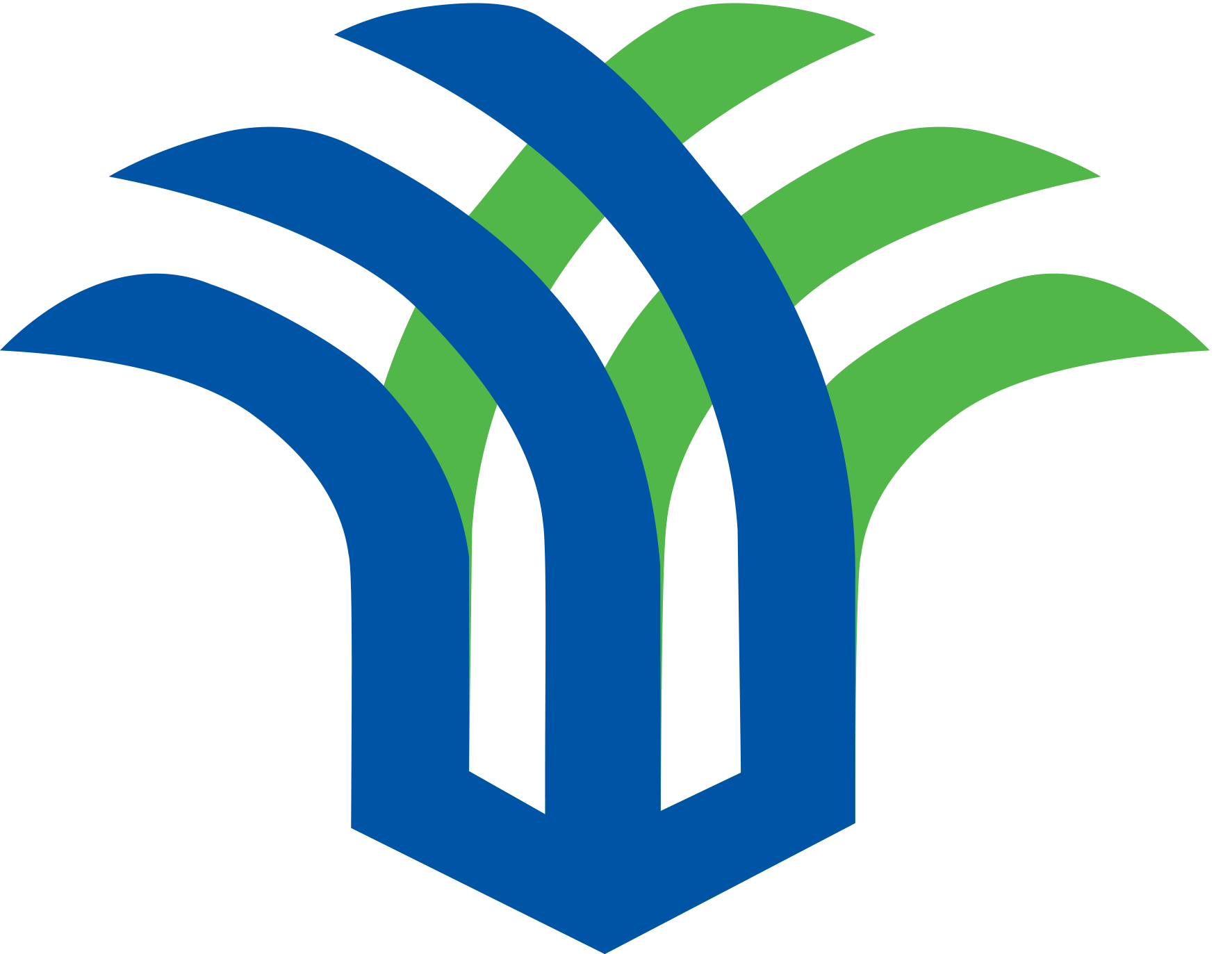
- Logo of the Ministry of Investment and Downstream Industry

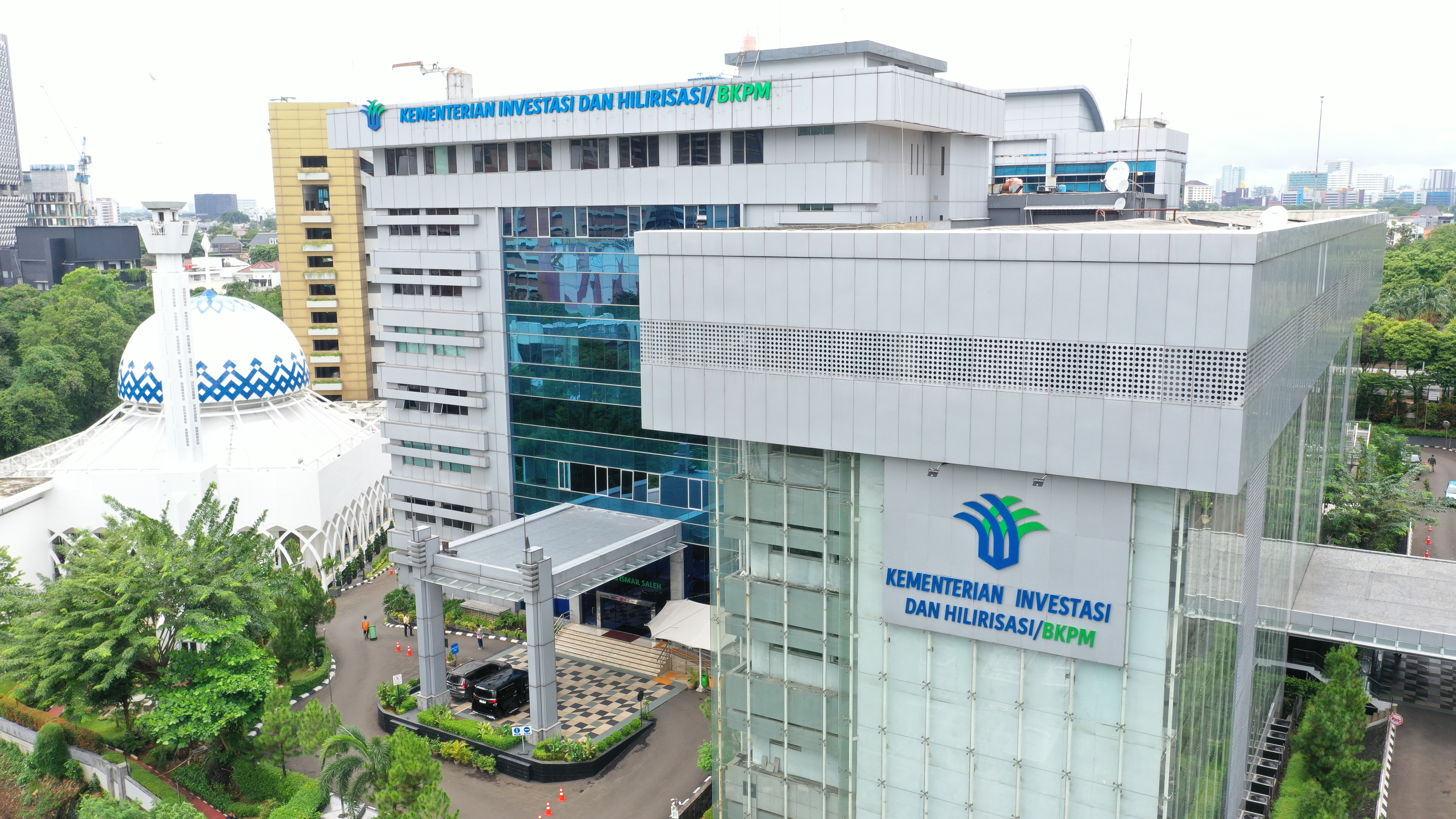
- Ministry of Investment and Downstream Industry headquarters

Ministry overview
- Formed: 28 April 2021; 5 years ago
- Jurisdiction: Government of Indonesia
- Ministers responsible: Rosan Roeslani, Minister of Investment; Yuliot Tanjung, Deputy Minister of Investment
- Website: www.bkpm.go.id

The Ministry of Investment and Downstream Industry/Indonesia Investment Coordinating Board (Indonesian: Kementerian Investasi dan Hilirisasi/Badan Koordinasi Penanaman Modal) is a government ministry formed by the Indonesian government in 2021. The ministry is responsible for investment affairs and facilitating easiness of investment in Indonesia.

== History ==
On 30 March 2021, Joko Widodo submitted a Presidential Letter No. R-14/Pres/03/2021 to People's Representative Council containing a proposal for major change to his cabinet. In his Presidential Letter, Ministry of Investment, will be spun off from existing Coordinating Ministry for Maritime and Investments Affairs to be independent ministry on its own, but still under its coordination.

On 9 April 2021, People's Representative Council, approved the changes.

The form of the ministry is not yet known at that time of announcement of approval. It was speculated that the new ministry either split off from part of Coordinating Ministry for Maritime and Investments Affairs or elevation of existing Investment Coordinating Board. However, it later confirmed that the ministry is actually elevation of Investment Coordinating Board. If done, this ministry is continuation of previously Suharto era and early Reformasi era's Habibie State Ministry of the Promotion of Investment, which existed during 1993 to 1999, during Sixth Development Cabinet and Development Reform Cabinet, respectively.

On 13 April 2021, Ali Mochtar Ngabalin, spokesperson and expert professional of Deputy IV (Information and Political Communication) Presidential Staff Office, announced that the second reshuffle will take place on second week of April 2021. However, due to many reasons, the second reshuffle finally announced on 28 April 2021. Unusual for reshuffle happening in Indonesia, this reshuffle was the first of its kind which not only reshuffled the ministers, but also disbanded ministry institutions during the mid-term. In this reshuffle, Bahlil Lahadalia was appointed the first holder of Minister of Investment. All appointed officials were inaugurated and their respective new offices were established with Presidential Decision No. 72/P/2021.

== Organizations ==
Based on Presidential Decree Nos. 184/2024 and 185/2024 and Ministry of Investment and Downstreaming Policy Decree No. 2/2024, the agency consisted of:

1. Office of the Ministry of Investment (concurrent post with Chief of Indonesia Investment Coordinating Board).
2. Office of the Deputy Ministry of Investment (concurrent post with Vice Chief of Indonesia Investment Coordinating Board).
3. Office of the Ministry Secretariat
4. Advisors to the Ministry:
  1. Enhancement of Investment Competitiveness
  2. Macroeconomy
  3. Institutional Relation
  4. Development of Prioritized Investment Sectors
  5. Equity and Partnerships in Capital Investment

== See also ==
- Cabinet of Indonesia
- Investment Coordinating Board
