= Rozy Munir =

Indonesian academic and diplomat (1943–2010)

Rozy Munir (April 16, 1943 – February 22, 2010) was an Indonesian politician, diplomat and leading figure in Nahdlatul Ulama, the largest Muslim organization in the country. He served as a government minister with the administration of former President Abdurrahman Wahid. In 2007, President Susilo Bambang Yudhoyono appointed Munir as Indonesia's Ambassador to Qatar, a position he held until his death in 2010.

Rozy Munir was born on April 16, 1943. He received his degree from the University of Hawaiʻi in the United States. He became an economics professor at the University of Indonesia.

Former President Abdurrahman Wahid, who was also a member of the Nahdlatul Ulama, appointed Munir as the country's investment and state-owned enterprises minister during his administration. As a leading figure in the Nahdlatul Ulama, sent more than 500 Indonesian students to the United Kingdom to study management and administration.

Munir headed the Nahdlatul Ulama's foreign affairs division before being appointed Ambassador to Qatar in 2007 by President Susilo Bambang Yudhoyono. He remained as ambassador until his death from liver cancer on February 22, 2010, in Jakarta at the age of 67. Munir was survived by his wife, Mufida Munir; Avianto Muhtadi, Benny Saaf and Citra Fitri, and three grandchildren. He was buried in Mojokerto, East Java.
