= Ismail Hasan Metareum =

Indonesian politician (1929–2005)

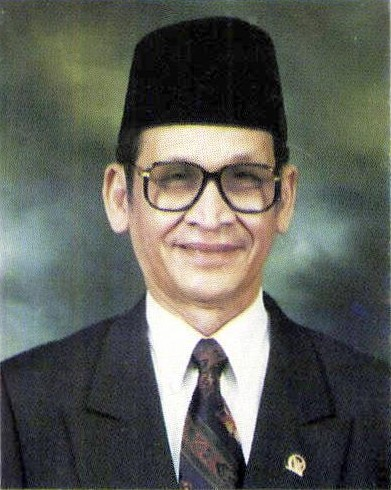

Deputy Speaker of the People's Consultative Assembly
- In office 1 October 1992 – 30 September 1999
- Speaker: Wahono; Harmoko
- Preceded by: Jailani Naro
- Succeeded by: Husnie Thamrin

Deputy Speaker of the House of Representatives
- In office 1 October 1992 – 30 September 1999
- Speaker: Wahono; Harmoko
- Preceded by: Jailani Naro
- Succeeded by: Hamzah Haz

3rd Chairman of the United Development Party
- In office 31 August 1989 – 2 December 1998
- Preceded by: Djaelani Naro
- Succeeded by: Hamzah Haz

Member of the House of Representatives
- In office 28 October 1971 – 30 September 1999
- Succeeded by: Multi-member district
- Constituency: S. R. Aceh (1971–1992); Jakarta (1992–1999)

Personal details
- Born: Ismail Hasan Metareum; 4 April 1929 Pidie, Atjeh, Dutch East Indies
- Died: 2 April 2005 (aged 75) Jakarta, Indonesia
- Party: PPP (1973–2005)
- Other political affiliations: Parmusi (1968–1973)
- Spouse: Maryani
- Children: 5
- Education: University of Indonesia
- Occupation: Politician

Ismail Hasan Metareum (4 April 1929 – 2 April 2005) was an Indonesian politician from the United Development Party. He served as the party's chairman from 1989 until 1998 and the vice chairman of the People's Representative Council from 1997 until 1999, and also vice chairman of the Supreme Advisory Council.

== Early life ==
Ismail's grandfather, Panglima Ibrahim, was a military commander in Aceh. Under the command of the then Sultan of Aceh, Ibrahim attacked the Dutch, bringing with him to the frontlines his son, and Ismail's father, Tengku Ben Hasan. Ibrahim was defeated by the Dutch Army, which had the support of several local kingdom. The Sultan of Aceh was captured, and Ben Hasan fled to Malaya via the Malacca Strait. In Malacca, Hasan studied Islam in a pesantren at Yan, which was organized by Tengku Tjhi'. No longer pursued by the Dutch, Hasan returned to Dutch-occupied Aceh, and then established a pesantren in Metareum. There, his wife, Hajah Hindun, give birth to Ismail Hasan Metareum on 4 April 1929. His middle name, Hasan, came from his father, and his last name came from his birthplace.

Until age 12, Ismail was taught in his fathers pesantren, Meunasah Baro, and also studied in the People's School. After finishing his elementary studies, he attended Madrasah Sa'adah Abadiyah, moving out in 1944 to live in a pesantren closer to his school. During his studies at Sa'adah Abadiyah, on 13 March 1942, the Japanese Army began occupying Aceh. The stationed Japanese troops, the Fujiwara Squad, promised to the people of Aceh that they would not violate the Sharia law. In reality, the Japanese Army forced students to dig trenches for the Japanese war causes. However, in Ismail's madrasah, his studies were not much disturbed by the Japanese.

On 17 August 1945, a year before he graduated, Sukarno and Hatta proclaimed the independence of Indonesia. The warlords and rulers in Aceh urged their people to fight for independence, influencing Ismail to join the struggle for independence while continuing his studies. Ismail graduated in 1946 at the age of seventeen, after which he attended the Islamic Junior High School of Banda Aceh. He was appointed as the Head of the Staff Commando III of the Islamic Student Army (TPI) until 1950, and joined the Mujahiddin Warriors from 1945 until 1947, a similar organization to TPI. He graduated in 1949, the same year Indonesian sovereignty was recognized by the international community.

In 1949, he left Banda Aceh for Jakarta. In the city, Ismail enrolled in the General High School No. 3 in Central Jakarta as a 2nd grader, skipping 1st grade. During his studies, he frequently visited the presidential palace in Jakarta, where Sukarno give a political speech regularly every Saturday.

== In the Muslim Students' Association (HMI) ==
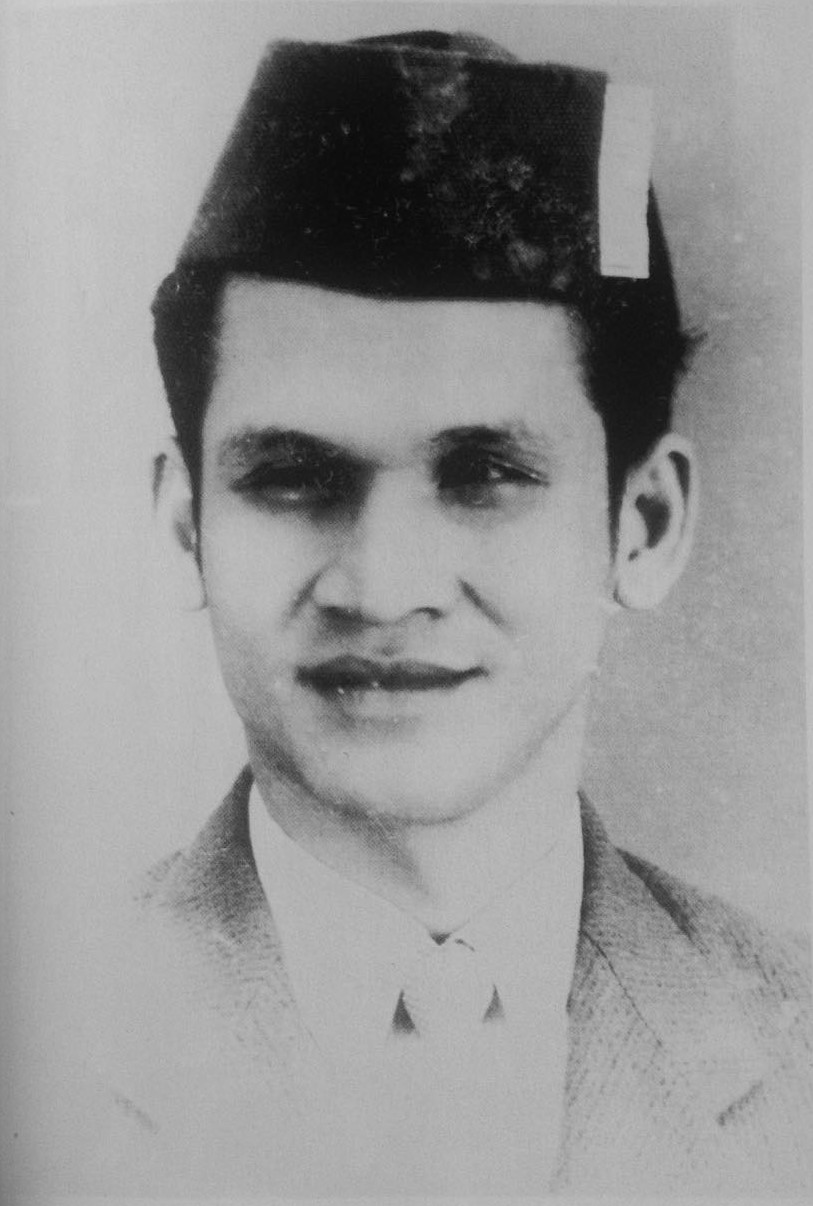
Ismail Hasan Metareum as the chairman of the Muslim Students' Association, 1957

Ismail became a student in the Law Faculty of the University of Indonesia in 1952. As a student previously active in Islamic youth movements, Ismail was interested in the Muslim Students' Association (HMI), which was one of the largest Muslim youth movements at the time.

He initially rejected the offer to enter the association, believing the chairman of HMI, Dahlan Ranumihardjo, to be aligned with Sukarno. Ranumihardjo had invited Sukarno to speak about the vision of Indonesia and the state of Islam. In his speech, Sukarno affronted the Islamic leaders of Masyumi, which Sukarno would later dissolve in 1960. Due to this incident, Ismail considered HMI as more oriented to nationalism than to Islam. However, after clarification from Dahlan, Ismail joined HMI. Two years into his membership, Ismail was chosen as the Vice Chairman of the branch in Jakarta. A year later, he was chosen as the vice chairman of HMI for the 1955–1957 term, and later as the chairman of the organization until 1960.

During Ismail's tenure as the chairman of HMI, Sukarno pushed his ideology of Nasakom, supporting communism. In response, HMI united with other Islamic organizations to counter communist ideology in Indonesia, creating the Union of Indonesian Islamic Youth Organizations. To align views of Islam against communism, Ismail was asked by the then Minister of Religion, Wahid Hasyim, to read out a statement rejecting communism in Islam.

== In the Parmusi ==
Ismail joined Parmusi, which was the continuation of Masyumi, in 1967. He entered the party prior to its official approval. During the party's first years, it struggled to consolidate with the grassroots of the party. To address this issue, in May 1967 Ismail met with his friends Omar Tusin and Hasbullah, and they agreed to meet with the former members of Masyumi in a villa Tusin owned on Puncak. The meeting garnered the support of the former members of Masyumi for Parmusi. Ismail was later chosen as a member of the party's executive committee, representing HMI.

=== Coup ===
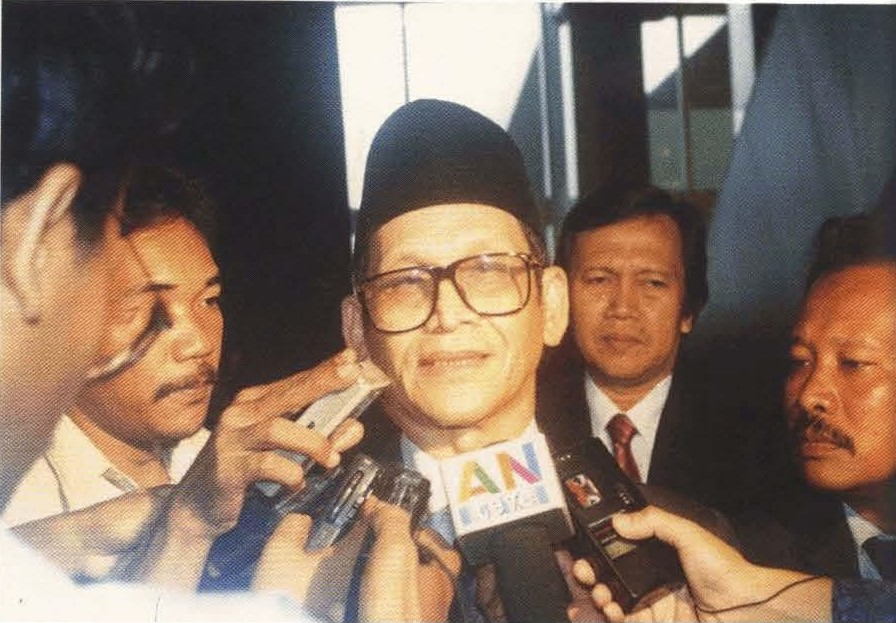
Ismail being interviewed by the press

In 1970, the executives of Parmusi held a meeting to choose the party's representation in the General Elections Institution in Central Java, with Djarnawi Hadikusuma, the chairman of the party, Ismail, and several other figures in attendance. During the meeting, a radio report from Jakarta reported that a coup, led by Mohammad Syafaat Mintaredja, Jailani Naro, and Imran Kadir had overthrown the leadership of the party. Djarnawi quickly left Central Java for Jakarta, but the party's headquarters had already been occupied. Both parties claimed themselves as the legitimate executive of the party, but eventually agreed to arbitration by the government. The government appointed Mintaredja as the chairman of the party. Even though Ismail was in the other camp, he maintained a good relationship with Mintaredja.

== In the United Development Party ==
=== Vice Speaker of the People's Representative Council ===
Ismail was vice speaker of the People's Representative Council from 1992 until 1999. He served under two presidents, Suharto and B. J. Habibie.

== Death ==
Ismail died on 2 April 2005, at the age of 75.
