= Jailani Naro =

2nd Chairman of the United Development Party (1929–2000)

Djaelani Naro
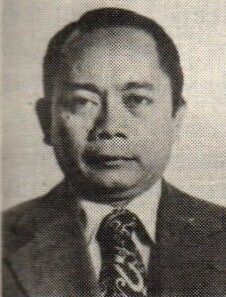

Vice Chairman of the Supreme Advisory Council
- In office 31 March 1978 – 23 March 1988
- President: Suharto

Deputy Speaker of the House of Representatives
- In office 28 October 1971 – 1 October 1977
- President: Suharto

2nd Chairman of the United Development Party
- In office 13 February 1978 – 31 August 1989
- President: Suharto
- Preceded by: Mohammad Syafa'at Mintaredja
- Succeeded by: Ismail Hasan Metareum

Personal details
- Born: 3 January 1929 Palembang, South Sumatra, Dutch East Indies
- Died: 28 October 2000 (aged 71) Jakarta, Indonesia
- Party: United Development Party
- Other political affiliations: Parmusi
- Occupation: Politician; prosecutor

Djaelani Naro, also known as John Naro (3 January 1929 – 28 October 2000) was an Indonesian politician and prosecutor. He had served as the vice chairman of the People's Representative Council, vice chairman of the Supreme Advisory Council and as the second chairman of the United Development Party.

== Early life ==
Naro was born in Palembang, South Sumatra, as the son of Haji Datoek Naro, a former employee of the Agricultural Department from Solok, West Sumatra.

During his youth, he became a member of Student Army in South Sumatra. After the recognition of Indonesia, he went to Yogyakarta to study at the Gajah Mada University. He did not finish his study there and went to Jakarta to study law at the University of Indonesia. He also joined the Jakarta Students Movement and the Indonesian Bachelor Action Forum.

== Career ==
After earning his law degree, Naro applied to work at the State Attorney. After a few years, he became the Chief of Offices of Jakarta High Court and Head of State Attorney of Denpasar in 1962.

== Political career ==
=== In the Parmusi ===
Naro entered Parmusi in 1968, during the formation of the party. He became one of the chairman for the matters of the party, representing Jamiatul al-Washliah. He became the chairman of the party after cooperating with Imron Kadir to take over the leadership of the party from Djarnawi Hadikusuma. After becoming the number one person in the party, he expelled Djarnawi from the party. The government responded in 1970 by degrading Naro from chairman to vice chairman and putting H.M.S. Mintaredja in the chairman seat of the party.

Three years later, Parmusi was fused into the United Development Party (PPP), and H.M.S. Mintaredja became the first chairman of the party. Naro followed the path of Mintaredja, and became one of the top ranks of the party leadership.

=== In the United Development Party ===
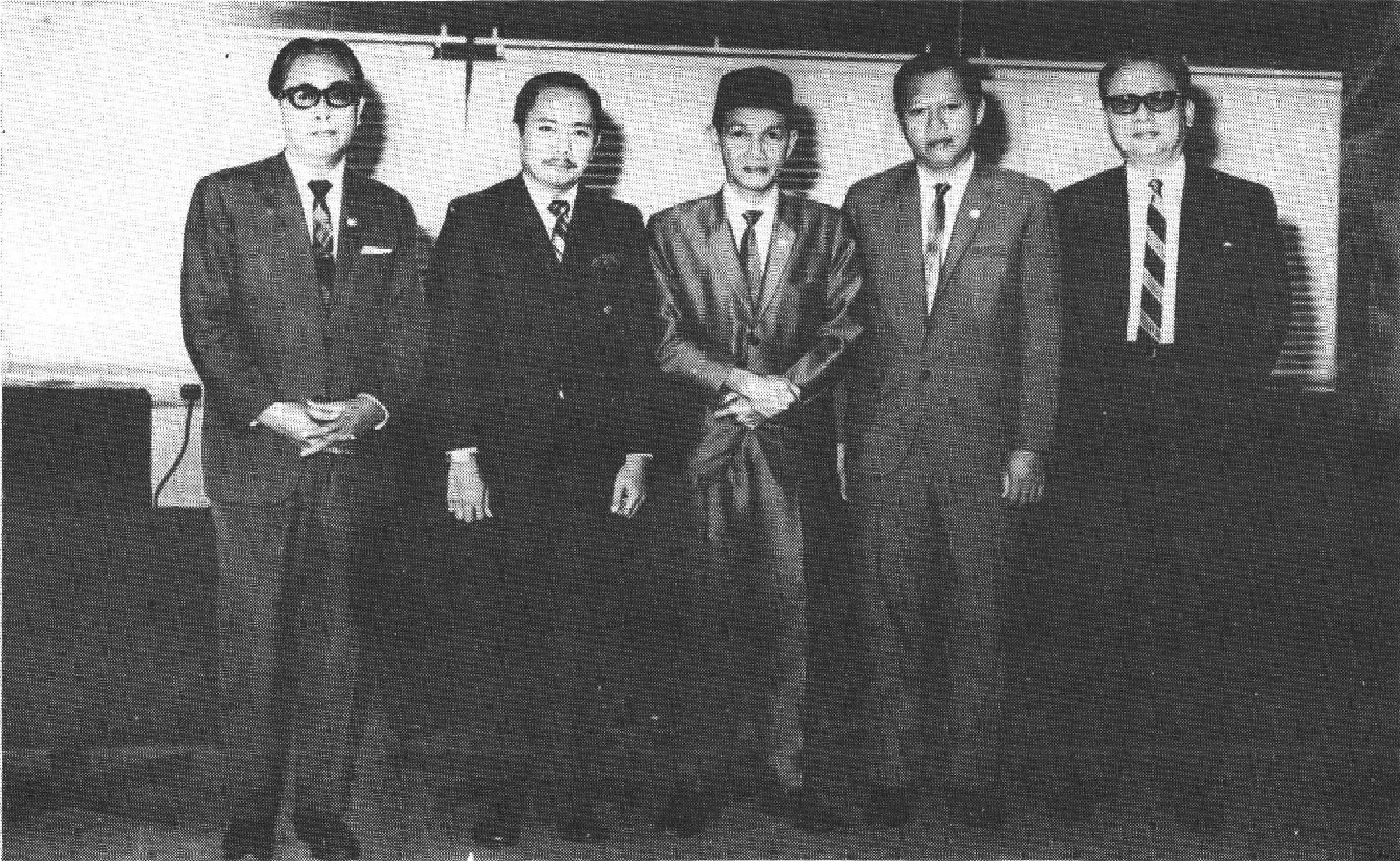
Naro posing as the vice chairman of the People's Representative Council. Naro was second from the left.

==== Internal conflict with Nahdlatul Ulama ====
The first years of the party was marred by internal conflict between the former political parties that had been fused into the party. Naro and others who originally came from the Parmusi, called themselves as the Muslimin Indonesia (MI) faction in the United Development Party. Later on, MI became one of the largest faction in the party, frequently conflicting with NU (Nahdlatul Ulama).

Naro's chance to become the chairman of the party widened after the walk out by the NU faction of the PPP during the 1978 General Session of the People's Consultative Assembly. After the walk out, Mintaredja was displaced as the chairman of PPP by the government through a political manipulation designed by Ali Murtopo, and the government replaced him with Naro. Without any meetings or muktamar, Naro declared himself as the chairman of PPP, supported by the government.

After Naro became the chairman of the party, he neutralized the vocalism of NU faction inside the party. Naro ensured that none of the party members had an independent source of power, and effectively centralized all of the patronage channels to himself. The blow to the NU faction by Naro became larger due to the hostilities of the government and military to NU members, especially small enterprises and merchants that support NU. The government changed its support to Muhammadiyah, a more modern Islamic organization.

The peak of Naro's hostility to the NU culminated during the 1982 Indonesian legislative election. During the formation of the temporary candidates for the legislative election in 1981, Naro reduced the proportion of the PPP candidates from the NU faction, and put the names of the NU faction way below the list, so low that it is impossible for them to be elected. This incident aggravated the conflict between the MI faction and the NU faction, and in 1984, after the first muktamar of the party, NU formally withdrew from the PPP party.

==== First Muktamar of the United Development Party ====
The first muktamar (conference) of the party that legitimizes Naro as the chairman, was marred with conflicts, even before the muktamar was held. During the preparation, Naro formed the committee for the muktamar without consultation of the party's president, Idham Chalid, causing the committee to become invalid and unrecognized by the ranks of the party.

==== Acceptance of Pancasila ====
During the 1980s, Soeharto prompted political parties to accept Pancasila as its only ideology, creating the concept of single principle. This concept was first delivered during Soeharto's speech in the Armed Forces meeting on 27 March 1980 and in the Kopassus anniversary on 16 April 1980. The concept was formally delivered in 1983, and was approved as a law in 1985. All political parties and mass organization should held Pancasila as its ideology and the only principle, ruling out other ideology previously held.

Even though Naro was supported by the government and his party accepted the single principle, Naro rejected this concept. He rejected the change of the party's symbol, from the Ka'aba to a star. This rejection was used by the Soedardji faction, an internal opposition of Naro's rule, to delegitimize him. Soedardji failed to overthrow Naro from the chairman, and Soedardji created a new Central Executive Council of the party, causing dualism in the party. Soedardji demanded Naro to organize an extraordinary muktamar to end the conflict in the party.

==== Candidate for Vice President ====
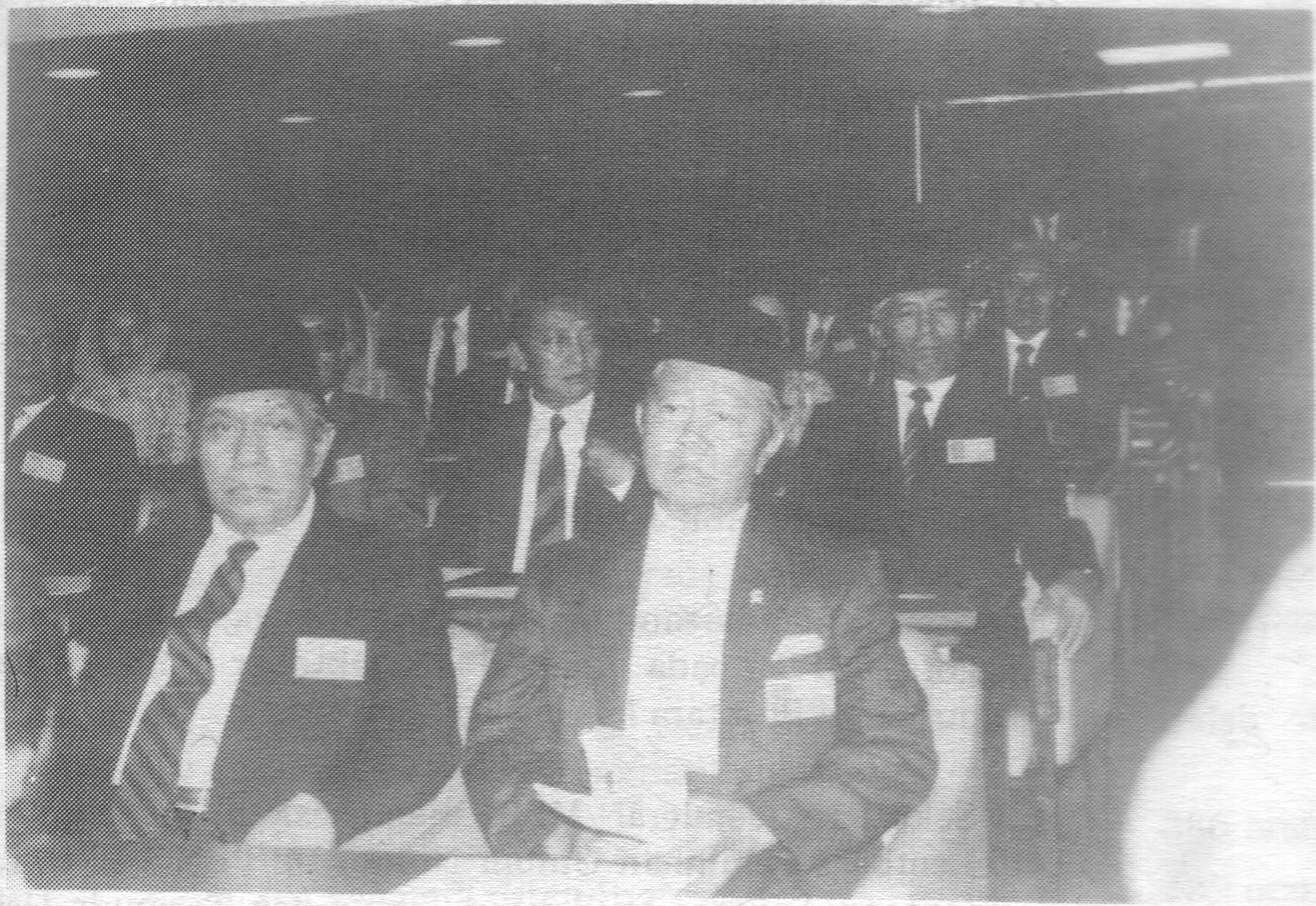
General session of the People's Representative Council in 1987.

As the leader of the PPP, Naro was nominated as a candidate for the vice president for Soeharto's fifth term. Naro was presumably supported by the private backing of the armed forces. Opposing him was Sudharmono, which was nominated by Golkar, and supported officially by the armed forces, regional delegation, and the Indonesian Democratic Party. The supporters of Sudharmono persuaded him to step down from his candidacy, so that Sudharmono would be appointed as vice president by Soeharto, and the session of the MPR can be finished in time.

Soeharto intervened the discussion about the vice presidency by saying that "the candidate that predicts himself would not obtain majority for the election should withdraw". B.M. Diah explained that Soeharto's statement expects the withdrawal of the said candidate "to give more room to those who certainly elected with the most votes". Still, Naro insisted on his candidacy, claiming that Soeharto didn't gave him the signal to step down.

On 10 March, just before the election in the MPR for the vice president, three ranks from the PPP met Soeharto. The next morning, the PPP fraction sends a letter to the speaker of the MPR that states the withdrawal of Naro's candidacy for the position of Vice President. The letter was read out during the MPR session for the election of vice president. This makes Sudharmono the only candidate for the vice president position, and he was inaugurated on the same night.

After the session, Naro was asked by reporters about the withdrawal of his vice president candidacy. Naro claimed that he wasn't withdrawing, and compared himself to a boxer that was "stopped by the promoter".

As a protest to the pressure by Soeharto to Naro, Sarwo Edhie Wibowo, a former general allied to Soeharto, withdrew from the legislative. It was the only time in the history of the New Order a dissent occurred on the election of vice president post, and broke the Soehartoist concept of "deliberation to reach consensus".

=== In the United Party ===
After the reformation in Indonesia, Naro established a new party on 3 January 1999, United Party. He established it after being disappointed by the results of the third muktamar of the PPP. The United Party was filled with PPP cadres that left the party after the reformation.

== Family ==
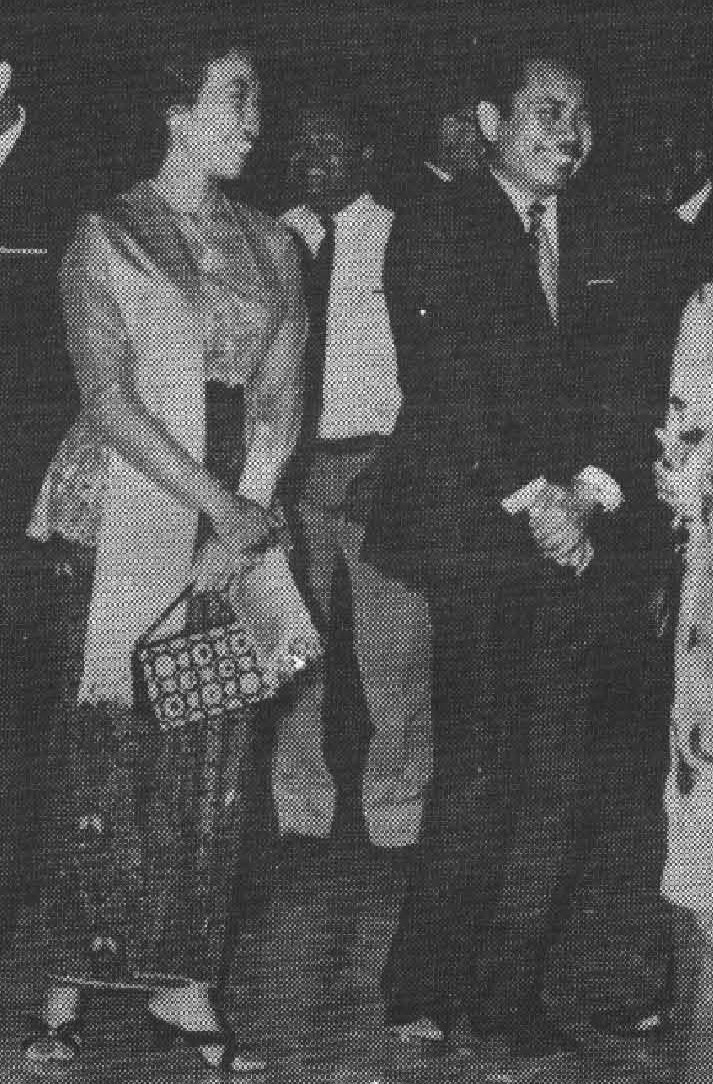
Jailani Naro with his wife.

Jailani Naro was married to Ida Andalia Tirtaatmadja. The marriage resulted in three children, Muhammad Husein, Nandalia Herlanggawati, and Wulan Sari.

== Death ==
Naro died on 28 October 2000 at the age of 71. He was buried in the Kalibata Heroes' Cemetery, Kalibata, Jakarta. Several prominent officials from the New Order era came to mourn at the funeral home. Among those are Sudharmono, Emil Salim, and Harmoko.

Prior to his death, Naro was treated intensively on the Pelni Hospital in Petamburan.
