= Operation Black Crow =

1965 Military Operations in Banyuwangi

- Part of Indonesian mass killings of 1965–66
Date	18 October 1965
Location	Banyuwangi, East Java, Indonesia
Result	Nahdlatul Ulama victory

Belligerents
Indonesia; NU; PNI	PKI

Strength
Unknown	Unknown

Casualties and losses
62 people executed	thousands were killed

The Operation Black Crow (Indonesian: Operasi Gagak Hitam), conducted by paramilitary groups called Gagak Hitam, aimed to retaliate against PKI action at villages on Banyuwangi Regency that killed or executed 62 peoples from Banser. The paramilitary forces plundered many suspected PKI buildings and killed them in their building or houses, many of their bodies were thrown into rivers or valleys.

== Events ==
In 1965, PKI loyalists launched mass killing and murder in the village of Cemethuk, Banyuwangi Regency. At least 62 people were killed. The Nahdlatul Ulama (NU) formed the paramilitary group called Gagak Hitam to crack down on the PKI. The group was not affiliated with Indonesian National Armed Forces.

The next day the paramilitary forces launched an order to kill many of the PKI members at Banyuwangi Regency. This was supported by many civilians. Gagak Hitam forces entered many suspected PKI buildings and houses and assaulted their members, whose bodies were thrown into rivers or valleys.
