= Abdul Wahab Hasbullah =

Indonesian Ulama

Kyai Hajj Abdul Wahab Hasbullah
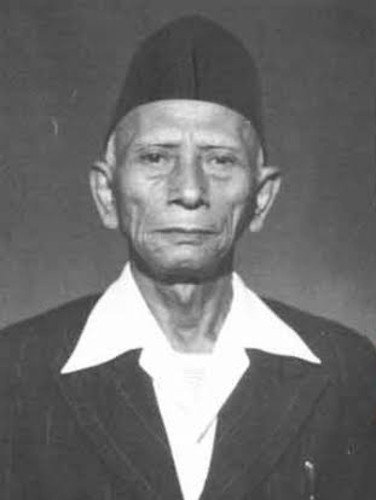

Personal life
- Born: 31 March 1889 (Netherlands) Jombang, East Java, Dutch East Indies
- Died: 29 December 1971 (aged 82) Jombang, East Java, Indonesia
- Home town: Jombang
- Parents: KH. Hasbulloh Said (father); Nyai Latifah (mother)

Religious life
- Religion: Islam
- Denomination: Sunni
- Founder of: Nahdlatul Ulama
- School: Traditionalism

Muslim leader
- Teacher: Mahfudz at-Tarmisy; Mukhtarom; Ahmad Khatib; Bakir; Asy’ari; Abdul Karim ad-Daghestany; Abdul Hamid; Umar Bejened

Kyai Hajj Abdul Wahab Hasbullah (31 March 1889 – 29 December 1971) was a founders of the Nahdlatul Ulama movement. He also initiated the usage of newspaper for dakwah, with the establishment of the Nahdlatul Ulama newspaper, Soeara Nahdlatul Oelama. He also created the lyrics for the anthem of Nahdlatul Ulama, Ya Lal Wathon, in 1934.

He was the father of Mundijah Wahab, the current mayor of Jombang.

== Early life ==
Abdul Wahab Hasbullah was born in the village of Gedang, in Jombang, East Java. According to correspondence with Hasbullah, he didn't know the exact date of his birth. In the parliamentary almanac, his birth date was 31 March 1888, he approved his birth year as 1887. He was the first son of the eight brothers from his father Chasbullah and mother Nyai Latifah. Chasbullah was the head of the Tambakberas Jombang pesantren. Hasbullah's genealogy can be traced back to Joko Tingkir and Brawijaya VI.

== Education ==
His childhood was mostly spent in Pesantrens (Islamic boarding school). Before he was seven year old, his father taught him about religion. After his father decided that he was mature enough to study in a pesantren, he was sent to the Langitan Pesantren under Kyai Ahmad Sholeh. Then, at the age of thirteen, his father decided that Wahab should study at several different pesantrens, in order to experience the uniqueness of each pesantrens, especially in the Islamic studies, such as Al-Quran study tafsir, hadith, Arabic, and tasawuf.

== Career ==
Abdul Wahab Hasbulloh was a founding father of NU, listed as a council member with Ki Hajar Dewantoro.

In 1916 he founded the Islamic Youth Organization, Nahdlatul Wathan. in 1926 he became Head of the Hijaz Committee, meeting the King of Saudi Arabia, Ibn Saud. Abdul Wahab Hasbulloh also designed the leadership structure of the Nadhlatul Ulama with the two bodies, Syuriyah and Tanfidziyah as an effort to unite the old and the youth.

Abdul Wahab Hasbullah formed the Tashwirul Afkar (thought agitator) discussion group in Surabaya in 1914. The group initially organized activities with a limited number of participants. However, due to the group's openness of thought and opinion and the broad social relevance of the topics discussed, the group quickly gained popularity and attracted the attention of young people. The forum became a gathering place for many Islamic figures from diverse backgrounds to engage in debate and tackle complex issues considered of great significance.

The establishment of Ansor Youth Movement from the Nadhlatul Ulama started from the differences between traditionalist and modernist figures that emerged within Nahdlatul Wathan. Abdul Wahab Hasbullah, a traditionalist, and Mas Mansyur, a modernist, eventually took different paths during the establishment Islamic youth organizations. In 1924, the young people who supported Abdul Wahab Hasbulloh formed a group called Syubbanul Wathan (Youth of the Homeland). The organization became the forerunner of the Ansor Youth Movement. The name "Ansor" was suggested by Abdul Wahab Hasbullah, taken from the honorary name given by Muhammad to the people of Medina who had contributed to the spread of Islam.

Although Ansor was declared as part of the NU, it was not formally included in NU's organizational structure until the 9th NU Conference in Banyuwangi, on 24 April 1934.

== Death ==
Abdul Wahab Chasbullah died in Jombang at the age of 83 on 29 December 1971. Forty-three years later, on 7 November 2014, Wahab was declared a National Hero of Indonesia by President Joko Widodo.

== Bibliography ==
- Anam, Choirul (2015), KH Abdul Wahab Chasbullah: Hidup dan Perjuangannya [KH Abdul Wahab Chasbullah: His Life and Struggle] (in Indonesian), Surabaya: PT. Duta Aksara Mulia
- Noer, Deliar (1980), Gerakan Modern Islam di Indonesia: 1900-1942 [Modern Islamic Movement in Indonesia: 1900-1942] (in Indonesian), Jakarta: Pustaka LP3ES Indonesia
