= 1971 Indonesian legislative election =

- 3 July 1971

360 of the 460 seats of the House of Representatives 181 seats needed for a majority

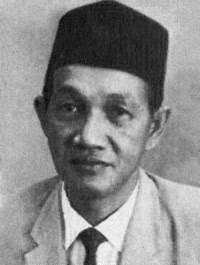

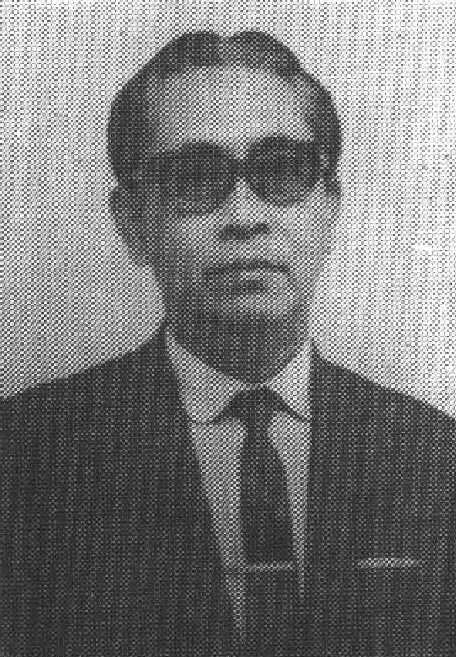

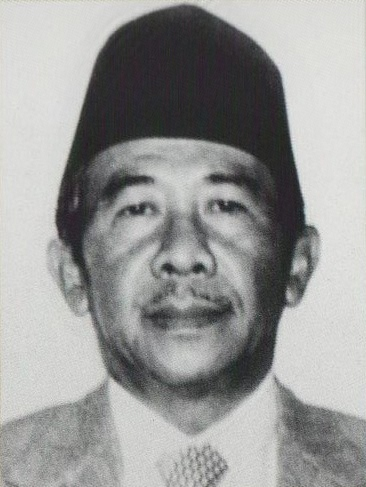
	First party	Second party
Leader	Suprapto Sukowati	Idham Chalid
Party	Golkar	NU
Last election	Did not exist	18.41%, 45 seats
Seats won	236	58
Seat change	New party	▲13
Popular vote	34,348,673	10,213,650
Percentage	62.80%	18.67%
Swing	New party	▲0.26pp
	Third party	Fourth party
Leader	Mohammad Isnaeni	Mohammad Syafaat Mintaredja
Party	PNI	Parmusi
Last election	22.32%, 57 seats	20.92%, 57 seats
Seats won	20	24
Seat change	▼37	▼33
Popular vote	3,793,266	2,930,746
Percentage	6.93%	5.36%
Swing	▼15.39pp	▼15.56pp
Speaker before election
Achmad Sjaichu
NU
Elected Speaker
Idham Chalid
NU

Legislative elections were held in Indonesia on 3 July 1971, the first under the New Order regime. There were ten participants; nine political parties and the "functional group" Golkar, which came first with more than 60 percent of the vote, resulting in an absolute majority in the People's Representative Council.

== Background ==
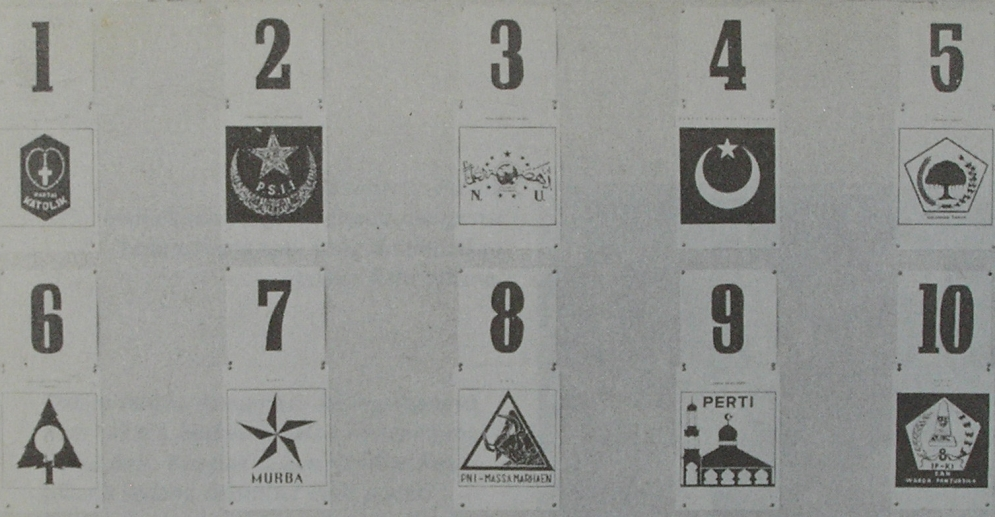
The symbols and ballot paper numbers of the organizations participating in the 1971 general election

In March 1966, President Sukarno signed a document giving Army commander Suharto authority to restore order. Suharto used this document to ban the Communist Party of Indonesia (PKI), which was officially blamed for the coup attempt the previous September. In June, the Provisional People's Consultative Assembly (MPRS) passed a resolution calling for elections to be held by 5 June 1968. Two years later, the People's Consultative Assembly elected Suharto president. The army-backed New Order regime subsequently announced that the Golkar organisation would be its political vehicle. The regime stressed that Golkar ("Functional Groups") was not a political party. In order to give General Ali Murtopo, a member of Suharto's personal staff, time to turn Golkar into an organisation fit to command a majority in the legislature, the general election originally planned for no later than 5 July 1968 was postponed to no later than 5 July 1971.

After a time with no word from the government concerning the forthcoming election, on 22 October 1968, the Sinar Harapan daily reported a statement by President Suharto to the effect that the government had begun to take the necessary steps to organise the poll. A General Election Board was established in mid-1969 headed by Minister of Home Affairs Amir Machmud. On 23 September 1970, the ballot paper numbers and electoral symbols for the 10 election participants were announced.

A total of 6,000 tons of paper, 6 ships, 45,000 motor vehicles and 793,036 ballot boxes (lockable to ensure secrecy of the ballot) were needed for the election.

== Campaign ==
=== Regulations and restrictions ===
On 22 April, Home Affairs Minister General Amir Machmud announced the election campaign rules, and two days later spoke on television and asked all election participants to campaign for national, not party issues. The official campaign ran from 27 April to 25 June. Under the rules, which the newspaper Harian Kami called "The Twelve Commandments", election participants were forbidden to question the state Pancasila ideology, the 1945 Constitution and the government's policies or their implementation. Also banned were disrespectful comments about state officials or leaders of foreign countries. Permission for election rallies had to be obtained in advance, and all election materials had to be submitted to the authorities for approval. There was also a specific ban on "partisan use" of the name of former president Sukarno, which affected the PNI campaign in particular as two of Sukarno's children, Guntur and Rachmawati campaigned for the party in the early stages. The seven-day period after the end of the campaign was a "calming down" period, with no campaigning and all election posters within 300 meters of polling stations being removed.

=== Themes and goals ===
Most of the main theme for campaign by the political parties were democracy and development. The Catholic Party promoted their "Three Programs", which included democracy, reform, and development. Their campaign head was I. J. Kasimo, who stated that the main goal for the Catholic Party was to protect human rights in Indonesia. Similar to their Catholic counterpart, the Indonesian Christian Party also promoted human rights, also campaigning for regional autonomy, and the equal partnership of the army, Golkar, and political parties.

Nationalist and socialist political parties, such as the Indonesian National Party (PNI) and Murba Party also emphasized the need to implement the state Pancasila ideology and the Constitution of Indonesia. In a speech on national television, PNI leader Usep Ranawidjaja stated that Pancasila and constitution were the basic things that the government need to run the country and carry out the people's will. He also stated that democracy in the political system of Indonesia had to be implemented with all of its consequences.

Islamic political parties, such as Parmusi, Nahdlatul Ulama, and the Indonesian Islamic Union Party (PSII), also adopted a main campaign theme similar to other political parties. Parmusi, the newest party in the elections, stated on 17 March 1971, that the party would not establish an Islamic state or another new country, but would continue to defend Pancasila and the constitution. The party also stated that it supported the five-year plan of the government. Nahdlatul Ulama stated on national television on 29 April 1971 that one of its main goals for the election was to enforce and uphold Sharia and the belief in God according to Pancasila. The party also supported the idea of villages as the basis for development, and industrialization as a way to end unemployment. The PSII campaigned for the election to be a way to exemplify the democratic system in Indonesia. Even though it was an Islamic party, the PSII focused its campaign on constitutional rather than religious matters.

Unlike the other Islamic parties, Perti did not have any grandiose promises or ideals. Instead, it focused its campaign on rural matters, such as irrigation, roads, and agricultural matters. It insisted that problems in those sectors should be fixed immediately by the government. Perti itself viewed the elections as a way to educate the citizens to understand their rights and duties.

Meanwhile, Golkar, which was an organization rather than a political party in the election, used its five-point political statement as the main basis for its campaign. The political statement stated that Golkar would implement a system of democracy based on Pancasila, form a new and clean government, hold further elections, and secure the national revolution. Golkar further stated that "the new history of Indonesia was made possible by the cooperation of the army, people, and Golkar", and promised that Golkar would not be divided based on ideology, but rather would be a big tent. The big tent principle of Golkar would later help it to be supported by large groups, mainly by the army and government employees.

=== Campaign methods ===
Most of the campaign used traditional methods, such as mass gatherings and the display of banners. Mass gatherings mostly took place in stadiums, school fields, and in sports halls. Places of worship were also used by Islamic and Christian political parties to gather crowds. For example, the Catholic Party gathered at the Jakarta Cathedral, and the Islamic parties frequently used mosques as a way to rally their masses.

A more modern tactic for campaign was also used by political parties, involving motor vehicles donated by the government. For example, the Nahdlatul Ulama held a rally at Ujungpandang, involving around a thousand cars and motorcycles, and carrying around the symbol of Nahdlatul Ulama. The PSII was given several Toyota cars, along with several thousand rupiahs in cash for their maintenance. Cars were used by the PSII for campaign purposes, and the party also built mosques. Golkar and the parties also made use of television and radio for campaign speeches, but they were only allowed to read pre-approved prepared texts.

== Manipulations ==
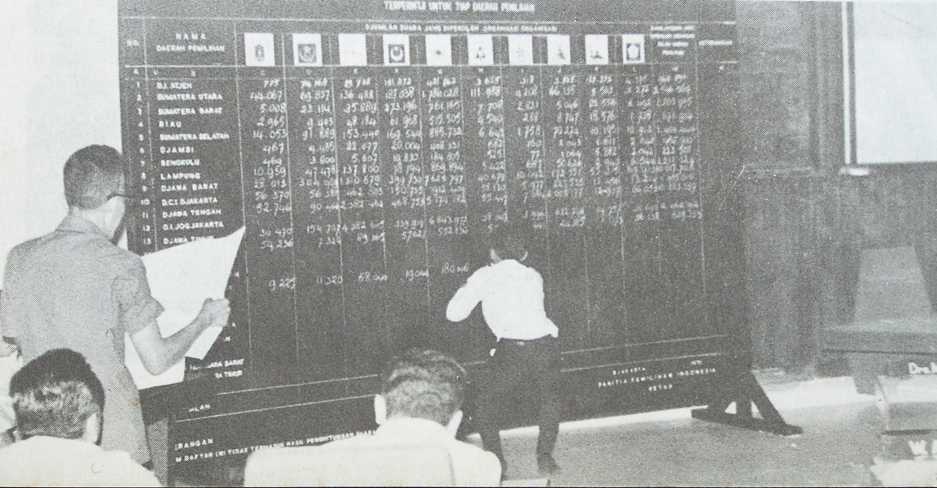
Officials recording the votes cast for each party in the Operations Room at the Home Affairs Ministry on 2 August 1971

Suharto's personal assistant and head of the Opsus Army intelligence organization, along with Home Affairs Minister Amir Machmud and internal security organization Kopkamtib were tasked with making sure Golkar won the election. In order to weaken possible rivals to Golkar, the government manipulated the top two parties from the 1955 election, the Indonesian National Party (PNI) and Parmusi (the successor to Masjumi following that party's banning in 1960) such that they lost credibility in the eyes of voters. Given that the party that had come fourth, the Indonesian Communist Party, had been banned in the aftermath of the 30 September Movement coup attempt in 1965, that left only the Nahdatul Ulama (NU) as a major rival. Kopkamtib head General Sumitro later said that without the intervention from ABRI, Golkar would have lost the election to the Muslim parties.

Away from the political parties, civil servants were effectively obliged to vote Golkar and regional administrators were required to fulfill "quotas" of Golkar votes. The system of allocating seats was changed from that of the 1955 election to reduce the number of parties winning seats in the legislature. All seats were to be allocated in the regional electoral districts, rather than being divided up based on national results. The government also disqualified large numbers of candidates from the political parties. Hardest hit was the PNI, with 171 disqualifications leaving it with 506 candidates. Parsumi lost 141, and the NU lost 24 candidates.

== Results ==
The results were officially announced on 7 August. Although the Golkar victory was expected, given its financial advantages and superior access to transport and communication, as well as the strong support from the army, the collapse of the PNI vote surprised many. An opinion poll in Java and Madura from December 1970 to March 1971 had predicted it would garner 24.7 percent of the vote, but it won just 7 percent. Golkar won 227 of the 251 directly elected seats in the DPR as well as all nine indirectly elected seats in Western New Guinea. Golkar was also awarded the remaining 100 seats according to the provisions of the 1969 Election Law, giving it 336, almost three quarters of the total.

Party	Votes	%	Seats		
Party	Votes	%	Elected	Appointed	Total
Golkar	34,348,673	62.80	236	100	336
Nahdlatul Ulama	10,213,650	18.67	58	0	58
Indonesian National Party	3,793,266	6.93	20	0	20
Parmusi	2,930,746	5.36	24	0	24
Indonesian Islamic Union Party	1,308,237	2.39	10	0	10
Indonesian Christian Party	733,359	1.34	7	0	7
Catholic Party	603,740	1.10	3	0	3
Islamic Education Movement	381,309	0.70	2	0	2
League of Supporters of Indonesian Independence	338,403	0.62	0	0	0
Murba Party	48,126	0.09	0	0	0
Total	54,699,509	100.00	360	100	460
Registered voters/turnout	58,179,245	–			
Source: Cribb & Kahin (2004), Nohlen et al. (2001)

== Aftermath ==
Immediately before the election, a Golkar spokesman stated that he expected Golkar to win no more than 35 percent of the vote. Predictions from the other parties were for up to 100 seats from the PNI, up to 79 seats from Parmusi, 35 from Parkindo and 20 from Murba. Only the NU was anywhere close with its prediction of 65 seats, and it was the only party to do better than it had in the 1955 election. The Golkar landslide meant that a proportional representation system had produced a government party with a majority in the legislature. More important was that the Indonesian military, through Golkar, had become a participant in parliamentary politics. In 1973, the MPR comprising the membership of the new DPR together with the appointed regional, functional and social representatives, re-elected Suharto to the presidency.

A year before the election, President Suharto had said that he wanted the political parties to join in two groups, one religious and one nationalist. This led to the establishment in March 1970 of the United Development Group, comprising Nahdlatul Ulama, Parmusi, the PSII and Perti, and the Democratic Development Group, comprising the PNI, IPKI, Murba and the two Christian parties, which had refused to be grouped with the Muslim parties. After the election, Suharto announced that the DPR would comprise four factions, the Armed Forces (ABRI), Golkar, the Spiritual-Material Group (the Muslim parties) and the Material-Spiritual group (the PNI, Parkindo and the Catholic Party). In March 1973, year, the four Muslim parties, were forced to merge into the United Development Party, while parties of the Material-Spiritual group as well as IPKI and Murba (who had no DPR seats), were merged into the Indonesian Democratic Party. These parties were afflicted by internal divisions and were never a credible political threat. Forbidden to organize down to the village level and later obliged to accept Pancasila as their sole ideology, they were the only parties allowed to contest elections until the end of the Suharto regime.

== Presidential election ==
Following the legislative election, the People's Consultative Assembly (MPR), the legislative branch of Indonesia, met from 22 to 23 March 1973 to elect both the president and vice president of the country for the 1973–1978 term. Golkar, the faction with the most seats in the People's Consultative Assembly since 1971, nominated Suharto as its presidential candidate. He was thus re-elected president unanimously to a second term on 22 March. Hamengkubuwono IX was elected vice president on the next day.

Since the G30S/PKI incident, Indonesia had not held an election. After more than 20 years, Indonesia finally held an election that was won by Golkar, and a presidential and vice-presidential election was held in 1973. Before the 1973 presidential election, the rules on presidential elections were only based on the constitution. In addition, there were no official rules on presidential elections that could be used for subsequent presidential elections. Since the 1973 presidential election, however, rules were made so that there were now official and complete rules. These rules were also written in the MPR Resolution of 1973.
