= Banser =

Indonesian Islamic paramilitary group

- Multipurpose Ansor Front
- Barisan Ansor Serbaguna
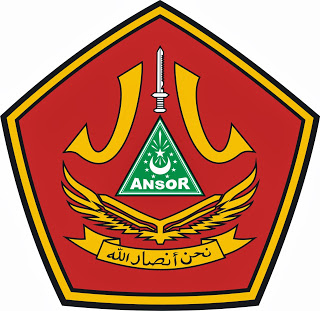
- Insignia of Banser
- Abbreviation: Banser
- Formation: 1937
- Type: Paramilitary Organization
- Purpose: "Providing security and services to ulamas and the general public"
- Headquarters: Jakarta
- Region served: Indonesia
- Official language: Bahasa Indonesia
- Head of the National Coordination Unit: Muhammad Syafiq Syauqi
- Parent organization: Ansor Youth Movement
- Affiliations: Nahdlatul Ulama
- Volunteers: 8,000,000 (2024)

Multipurpose Ansor Front, better known as Banser (abbreviation of Barisan Ansor Serbaguna), is an Islamic militia organization based in Indonesia. It is a paramilitary wing of the youth organization Ansor Youth Movement (GP Ansor) affiliated with Nahdlatul Ulama (NU), the largest Islamic mass organization in the world. Banser operates as a semi-autonomous body of GP Ansor and mainly serves for the security and humanitarian operations. Combined personnel of Banser doubles the number for the Indonesian National Armed Forces (TNI), making Banser (and its parent organization GP Ansor) a political heavyweight which holds the key to the national stability. Throughout the history, Banser had played major roles especially in issues related to religion, from the active participation in Indonesian mass killings of 1965–1966 against the perceived members of Indonesian Communist Party, to the more recent development of standoff against Hizbut Tahrir Indonesia. In terms of political orientation, Banser, along with GP Ansor, is characterized by traditionalist Islam, populism and nationalism.

== History ==
On April 24, 1934, the precursor of GP Ansor, Ansor Nahdlatul Oelama (ANO) was formally established as the youth wing of NU, and subsequently, the scouting organization Ansor Nahdlatul Ulama Front (Banoe) was formed by ANO Malang chapter. In 1937, during the 2nd ANO Congress, Banoe was formalized under the leadership of the commander Syamsoel Islam who was also the chairman of ANO Malang chapter. Banoe Malang was then under the advisory of the Indonesian Army commander Major Hamid Roesdi, and these two are considered the founding figures of Banser.

== Organization ==
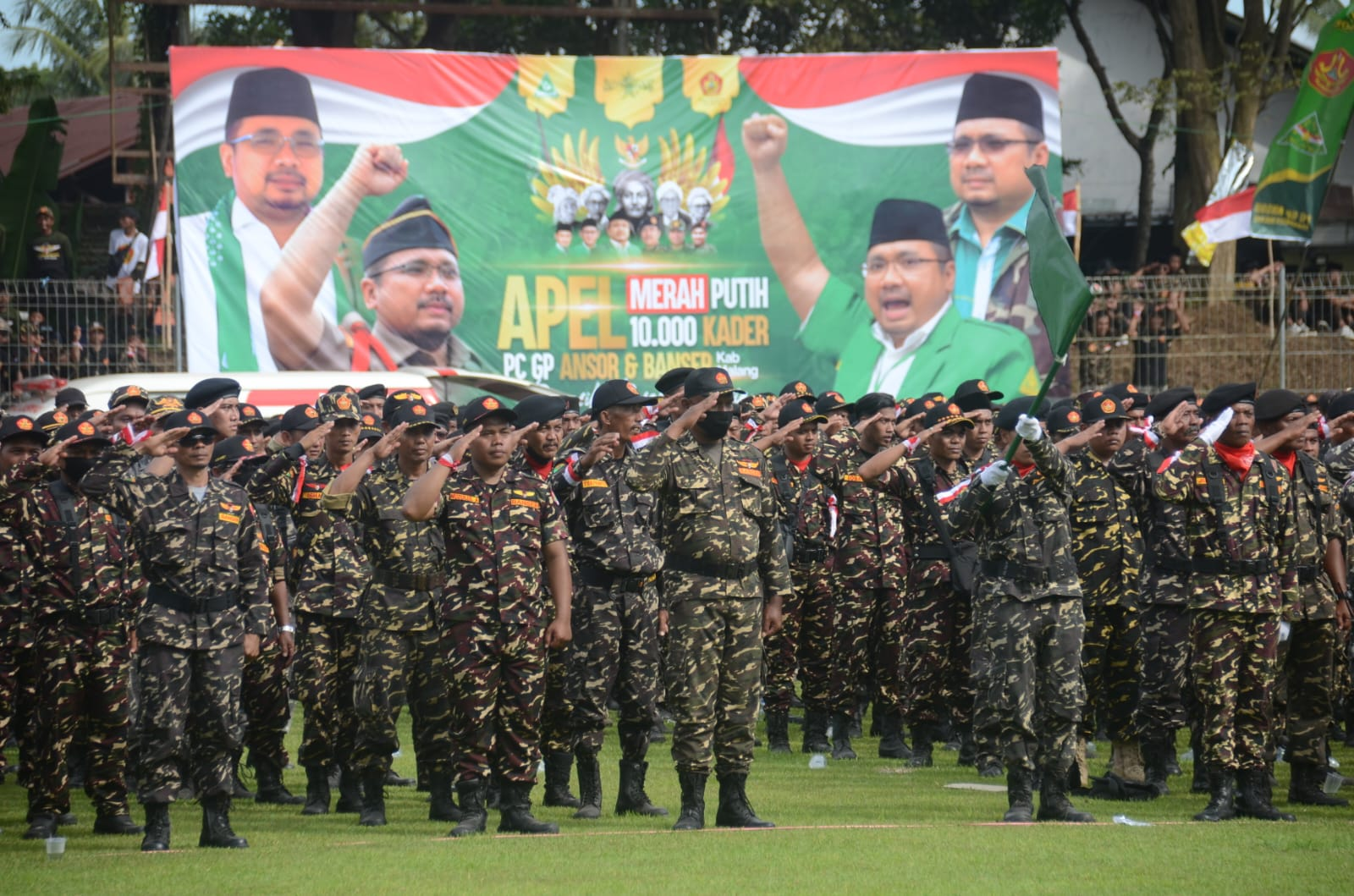
Banser saluting at troop call event.

Banser is supervised by GP Ansor through the coordination channel of the chairman of GP Ansor who has the authority towards the implementation of the military operations on all levels. Banser commanders have the communication channel toward the chairman of GP Ansor albeit limited to consultation. This organizational pattern is creating a semi-autonomous status of Banser, which is given by the chairman of GP Ansor and characterized by the higher autonomy on inter-organizational issues and higher dependency on GP Ansor on external interests of Banser.
