= Nahdlatul Wathan =

Islamic organisation based in Indonesia

- Flag of Nahdlatul Wathan
- Abbreviation: NW
- Formation: 1953
- Type: Sunni Islamic mass organization
- Headquarters: Lombok, West Nusa Tenggara
- Official language: Bahasa Indonesia
- Leader: Sitti Raihanun Zainuddin Abdul Madjid
- Website: https://nw.or.id/

Nahdlatul Wathan (Arabic: نهضة الوطن, lit. 'Revival of the Nation', abbreviated as NW) is an Islamic socio-religious organization based in Lombok, West Nusa Tenggara province, Indonesia. The organization was established by Muhammad Zainuddin Abdul Majid at Pancor, East Lombok Regency in 1953. The organization serves as a vehicle for societal movement, education, and Islamic proselytization (da'wah). It is currently the largest and the most influential Islamic mass organization in Lombok.

== History ==
During the National Awakening era of the early 20th century, Indonesia experienced a rapid expansion of Islamic socio-religious activity, witnessing the creation of two of the most influential Islamic organizations, Muhammadiyah (1912) and Nahdlatul Ulama (1926). While Muhammadiyah was inspired by the modernism imported from the Middle East, Nahdlatul Ulama, oriented toward traditional and vernacular Islam, was founded to counter the modernist trend. Nahdlatul Ulama had set up multiple branches across the archipelago, including Lombok, in which the branch was headed by the charismatic local saint Muhammad Zainuddin Abdul Majid, also known as Maulana Syeikh.

Maulana Syeikh was educated in Mecca, and after finishing his study in 1934, he returned to Lombok where he established a pesantren (Islamic boarding school) Al-Mujahidin. Later he renovated the pesantren to an Islamic seminary for male students, Madrasah Nahdlatul Wathan Diniyah Islamiyah (NWDI) in 1937. He also built a seminary for female students, Madrasah Nahdlatul Banat Diniyah Islamiyah (NBDI) in 1943. These two seminaries had witnessed rapid growth and popularity, prompting Maulana to expand their operations to other villages in Lombok. He then founded the organization Nahdlatul Wathan in Pancor, Selong, East Lombok Regency on March 1, 1953. (Note: Maulana Syeikh was awarded the title of National Hero of Indonesia in 2017 for his role in establishing Nahdlatul Wathan.) Since the establishment, the organization played a major role in the Islamization of Lombok.

During the New Order era, Nahdlatul Wathan had cooperated with the ruling party Golkar, albeit the political affiliation was not fixed. During 1965-1975, Nahdlatul Wathan had around 360 madrasahs in operation. In 1997, Nahdlatul Wathan was managing approximately 600 madrasahs, several private universities, and orphanages. With the death of Maulana, the fall of Suharto, and the democratic transition, Nadhlatul Wathan had experienced a turbulent era in the late 20th to early 21st century, in which internal strifes had involved almost all the active members. Today, Nahdlatul Wathan operates madrasahs all around the Indonesian archipelago, including Jakarta, Riau, Kalimantan, Sulawesi.
