= 1998–99 East Java killings =

Outbreak of violence in Indonesia

There was an outbreak of violence in East Java, Indonesia in 1998–99, around the time of the fall of Suharto, where local people killed at least 300 residents. People said they were being targeted by sorcerers following the deaths of cattle, and in response, unidentified vigilantes, which people described as ninjas due to their all-black clothing and masks, attacked and killed residents they suspected to be sorcerers. Some religious clerics were killed. In response to the killings, some people in the area attacked and killed people they suspected to be ninjas.

The outbreak began in February 1998, with most of the deaths occurring between August and September. The killings largely ended by the end of 1998; however, another group of about 10 similar killings occurred in December 1999. According to the National Commission on Human Rights, 307 people were killed during the scare in total: 194 people in Banyuwangi, 108 in Jember, and seven in Malang.

There were many rumours and theories about who killed people and what their motives were, including conspiracy theories. Scholars and journalists have described aspects of the outbreak of violence as a modern witch hunt or mass hysteria.

== Background ==
Historically, Banyuwangi Regency has been a centre of belief in black magic, specifically dukun santet, in Indonesia. Black magic practiced in Banyuwangi may be a mix of animist beliefs and Islamic mysticism which developed from inter-religious conflict during the 16th century Mataram court period. Belief in black magic was widespread in the area. Suspected sorcerers were also killed in Indonesia in 1965. In villages around Banyuwangi, local people killed suspected sorcerers intermittently for decades before the larger-scale violence in 1998.

The violence in 1998 was part of a period of major political and economic tensions in the country, including the May riots and the resignation of President Suharto. Indonesia was also impacted by the 1997 financial crisis. The East Java region had a history of outbreaks of violence, including against ethnic Chinese Indonesians in the previous January.

== Events ==
In early 1998, residents in Kaligondo, a village in Banyuwangi Regency, became concerned with sorcery after multiple cattle became sick and died. Local resident Soemarno Adi was suspected and was lynched on 4 February. His death sparked a number of other killings by vigilante groups. Some vigilantes dressed in all black, leading to them being called ninjas. Most victims were ordinary civilians, local leaders, or clerics affiliated with Nahdlatul Ulama.

In response, communities targeted by the sorcerer killings began to form mobs and attack and kill suspected ninjas, many of whom were people out after dark or without identity documents. The killing of suspected ninjas spread to Central and West Java, although no killings by suspected ninja had been reported in those regions. By November, police in Central Java had detained around 200 mentally ill people, as they were at risk of being attacked if they were out at night and unable to explain themselves.

On 18 October 1998, five men were killed in the Turen area. One was beaten to death, one was burned and three were beheaded. On 20 October 1998, three killings occurred. Two had been seized from a police car by vigilantes who reportedly slit their throats; the third man was beheaded and his head paraded around on a stake.

On 24 October at Gondanglegi, Malang Regency, another five suspected ninjas were killed by villagers, including one victim burnt to death. On 31 October and 1 November, three policemen were killed in Madura after being suspected to be ninjas. On 31 October, one man in north Jakarta was attacked on suspicions of being a ninja, marking the first time that the scare had impacted Jakarta.

=== Local press reports ===
On 1 October 1998, the Surabaya Post reported "a rumour about the existence of attacks by ninja-like squads" that were targeting "community leaders as well as ulama". In response, the neighbors of ulamas began organizing guard shifts "around the houses of ulamas who have become targets". On 4 October 1998, the Jawa Post reported that "prayer teachers are in the sights of groups of dozens of killers who wear all-black clothes and masks like ninjas".

== Theories ==
There have been a number of theories regarding who was behind the killings. Some have argued that the killings were encouraged covertly by the military in an effort to destabilize the new Indonesian government, or to weaken Nahdlatul Ulama or the emerging Islamic National Awakening Party. Nahdlatul Ulama has claimed that security forces were involved. The National Commission on Human Rights concluded in 2018 that the murders were "conducted by 'trained' and 'organized' assailants", and that national security forces enabled the killings by not intervening until September 1998. Anthropologist Nicholas Herriman interviewed many area residents and described the events as "local people killed other local residents whom they believed to be sorcerers", related to local perceptions that the government was not able to sufficiently protect them from sorcerers at the time.

== Impacts ==
The killings prompted discussion on the legal regulation of sorcery, to discourage individuals from "taking the law into their own hands".

== See also ==
- Islam and magic § Black magic (Siḥr)
