= Ansor Youth Movement =

Charitable organization in Indonesia

- Gerakan Pemuda Ansor
- Abbreviation: GP Ansor
- Formation: 24 April 1934; 92 years ago
- Type: Islamic youth organization
- Headquarters: Jl. Kramat Raya No.65 A, Kramat, Senen, Central Jakarta 10450
- Location: Jakarta
- Region served: Indonesia
- Official language: Bahasa Indonesia
- Leader: Addin Jauharudin
- Affiliations: Nahdatul Ulama
- Website: ansor.id

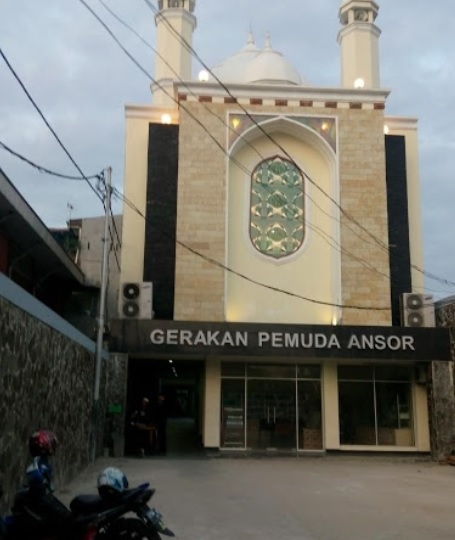
GP Ansor Jakarta office building.

Ansor Youth Movement (Indonesian: Gerakan Pemuda Ansor, often abbreviated as GP Ansor) is a non-profit Islamic youth organization based in Indonesia, affiliated with Nahdlatul Ulama (NU), the largest Islamic mass organization in the world. Founded on April 24, 1934, GP Ansor has maintained a significant role throughout the history of Indonesia, and it has developed its characteristics as traditionalist Islamic, populist, and nationalist. It has grown so far into 433 branches on the municipal and regent level, under the coordination by 32 district managers from provincial down to the village level. This is also coupled with the management of the multipurpose paramilitary wing Banser, which requires the special membership to join.

== Etymology ==
The name ansor was suggested by the renowned scholar Abdul Wahab, which was derived from the term ansar (Arabic: الأنصار al-Anṣār, "The Helpers"), the honorifics dedicated by the Islamic prophet Muhammad to the Medinan inhabitants who sheltered Muhammad and his companions during the hijra. GP Ansor had intended to derive a wisdom from them and consider their attitude, behavior, and spirit as their role model. They have always been referring to this wisdom as their basic values, namely helping, struggling, upholding and fortifying the teaching of Islam, and its members are required to adhere to these principles.

== History ==
=== Predecessors ===
The history of GP Ansor is linked with the history of Nahdlatul Ulama (NU). In 1921, there had been an idea among the Muslim community to establish an extensive Islam oriented youth organization, responding to the wave of new regional youth organizations such as Jong Java, Jong Ambon, Jong Sumatera, Jong Minahasa, and Jong Celebes. Behind the idea, there was a difference of theological position between the modernists, who adhere to the Islamic orthodoxy and modern education, and the traditionalists, who follow the traditional and syncretic form of Islam specific to Indonesia. The division between the two parties was surrounding the issues regarding taqlid (imitation, conformity to legal precedent), ijtihad (independent reasoning), maddhab (schools of Islamic jurisprudence) and other problems. In 1924, the traditionalist scholar Abdul Wahab formed his own organization called Syubbanul Wathan (lit: homeland of youth). The new organization was then led by Abdullah Ubaid as the chairman, Thohir Bakri as the vice chairman and Abdurrahim as the chief secretary.

Once Syubbanul Wathan was considered mainstream, it began attracting teenage Muslims. Administrators of the organization then decided to create a division dedicated to scouting, called Ahlul Wathan, as many other youth organizations during the time owned the scouting division. After NU, the traditionalist organization, was established on January 31, 1926, the popularity of Syubbanul Wathan had fallen, due to certain members becoming more active within NU. The youth organization, however, didn't directly become part of the NU structure. With the initiative of Abdullah Ubaid, finally, in 1931, Nahdlatul Ulama Youth Union (PPNU) was formed at the extension of Syubbanul Wathan. On December 14, 1932, it was transformed into Pemuda Nahdlatul Ulama (PNU). In 1934 it was reorganized again to Ansor Nahdlatul Oelama (ANO). Although ANO had been acknowledged as a part of NU, it wasn't formally listed in the NU structure, and the connection between the two remained unofficial.

=== Ansor Nahdlatul Oelama (ANO) era ===
Up until the time, the association between ANO and NU was considered informal. During the 9th NU Congress in Banyuwangi on April 24, 1934, ANO was formally accepted and ratified as NU youth wing by the board members. Thus the date is considered the official formation date of the movement as a whole. During the whole process, ANO Malang chapter had clandestinely formed a scouting organization called Ansor Nahdlatul Ulama Front (Banoe), which later developed into Multipurpose Front (Banser). During the 2nd ANO Congress in Malang in 1937, Banoe made its first official appearance in a marching line with uniform, led by the commander Syamsul Islam, who was also the chairman of ANO Malang chapter. Banser was officially established at the Congress as a military wing of ANO.

During the Japanese occupation, youth organizations including ANO were muzzled by the Japanese occupational administration. After the Indonesian National Revolution, the figure of ANO Surabaya chapter, Chusaini Tiway had proposed an idea to revitalize ANO. It was met with positive response from Wachid Hasyim, the Minister of Religious Affairs during the time, and ANO was reestablished with the new name Ansor Youth Movement on December 14, 1949.

== See also ==
- Banser, the GP Ansor paramilitary wing
