= Committee of Hejaz =

Former Islamic organization based in Dutch East Indies

Committee (or Commission) of Hejaz, (Indonesian: Komite or Komisi Hijaz) was a committee formed by several Indonesian Ulama in 1926 to send a delegation to Saudi Arabia because of concerns to the plans to ban visits by Muslims of other mazhabs to Mecca and Madina and to relocate the tomb of Muhammad by the newly created Bani Sa'ud kingdom. This small committee was the forerunner to the birth of NU organization.

== Origins ==
Since Ibn Saud conquered Hejaz area (which includes Mecca and Medina) in around 1924 and became the first king of the monarch of Saudi Arabia, Wahhabism sect became the dominant sect in the area. Other Islamic groups were banned to teach their mazhabs, even some of their scholars were jailed or killed. The ban created a mass exodus of scholars from around the world who came to these places to study and teach. They moved or returned to their respective countries, including scholars from Indonesia.

As initiative of Abdul Wahab Hasbullah, a small committee was formed to persuade and to submit some requests to Ibn Saud. The committee was under the approval of Hasyim Asy'ari. The members of the Committee were Wahab Habullah (advisor), Mashuri (advisor), Khalil (advisor), Hasan Gipo (chairman), Hasan Syamil (Vice Chairman), Muhammad Shadiq (Secretary), and Abdul Halim (Assistant).

== Activities ==
The main tasks of the Committee were to deliver concerns, formulate opinions and sum up the sights of Ahlul Sunnah scholars regarding the issues to be delivered to the new Ruler of Saudi Arabia, to form a delegation to go to the Hejaz and to contact other Islamic scholars in Java and Madura.

The first meeting was held on January 31, 1926 on Kertopaten street in Surabaya and attended by several Indonesian Ulama such as Hasyim Asy'ari, Bisri Syansuri of Jombang, Asnawi of Kudus, Nawawi of Pasuruan, Ridwan of Semarang, Maksum of Lasem, Nahrawi of Malang, Ndoro Munthaha of Bangkalan, Hamid Faqih of Gresik, Abdul Halim of Cirebon, Ridwan Abdullah, Mas Alwi and Abdullah Ubeid of Surabaya, Sheikh Ahmad Ghana'im of Egypt and others.

The formed delegation successfully sent their voice to Ibn Saud in 1928 with result that Ibn Saud deliberated the future pilgrimage and the holy cities. After its main task was done, they initially planned to dissolve the Committee, but Hasyim Asy'ari prevented so and suggested to make it become a permanent organization. Since then, the Committee transformed to a new organization called Nahdlatul Ulama.
