= Mohammad Syafaat Mintaredja =

Founder of the United Development Party (c. 1921 – 1984)

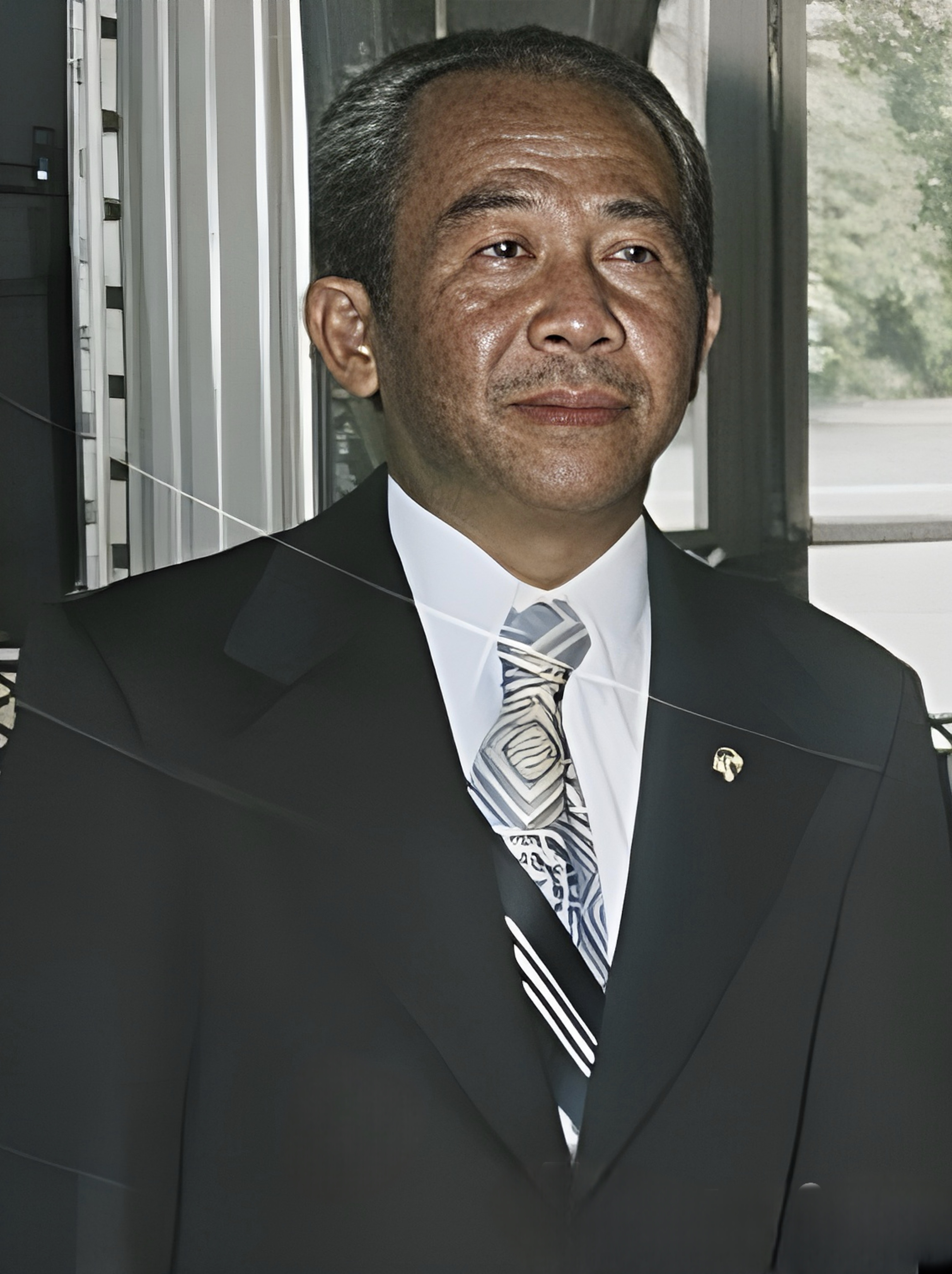
- Mohammad Syafaat Mintaredja, c. 1974

7th Ambassador of Indonesia to Turkey
- In office 8 November 1980 – 24 December 1983
- President: Suharto
- Preceded by: Nurmanli Aman
- Succeeded by: Abdulrachim Alamsjah

19th Minister of Social Affairs
- In office 9 September 1971 – 29 March 1978
- President: Suharto
- Preceded by: Albert Mangaratua Tambunan
- Succeeded by: Sapardjo

1st Chairman of the United Development Party
- In office 5 January 1973 – 13 February 1978
- President: Suharto
- Preceded by: Office established
- Succeeded by: Djaelani Naro

Personal details
- Born: 17 February 1921 Bogor, West Java, Dutch East Indies
- Died: 20 October 1984 (aged 63) Jakarta, Indonesia
- Party: United Development Party
- Other political affiliations: Parmusi
- Children: 4
- Education: Gadjah Mada University; Leiden University; University of Indonesia
- Occupation: Politician; activist
- Known for: Founder of P3
- Nickname: Pak Mintaredja

Mohammad Syafaat Mintaredja (17 February 1921 – 20 October 1984) was an Indonesian politician and activist who was the Founding Father of the United Development Party, serving as its first chairman from 1973 until 1978. He was a leader of Parmusi and several organizations, including the Muslim Students' Association and Muhammadiyah.

== Early life and education ==
Born into a Muhammadiyah family, he studied at the Faculty of Law at Gadjah Mada University in Yogyakarta and the Faculty of Law at Leiden University in the Netherlands. He earned a Bachelor of Laws degree from University of Indonesia. As a young man, he was active in Islamic Student Movement.

Along with several other people, he founded the Muslim Students' Association (Indonesia) based in Yogyakarta. He became the second chairman of HMI after Lafran Pane. He was also active in the Student Regiment, a civilian force trained and military prepared to defend the NKRI. During his time in the Student Regiment, he assisted the Indonesian National Armed Forces in fighting the Dutch Politionele acties and crushing the Communist Party of Indonesia rebellion in Madiun.

== Career ==
After being appointed as the chairman of the Indonesian Muslims' Party by President Suharto as part of the government's efforts to regulate the turbulent in Parmusi. During his leadership, Parmusi participated in the 1971 elections. At that time, the party received 2,930,746 votes (5.36%) and 24 seats in the House of Representatives (Indonesia), the third largest after Golkar and Nahdlatul Ulama. He remained as its leader until the party merged on 5 January 1973, Mohammad Syafaat Mintaredja founded the United Development Party together with Idham Chalid, Anwar Tjokroaminoto, Rusli Halil, and Masjkur which was the result of a merger of four Islamic-based parties, namely Nahdlatul Ulama, Indonesian Muslims' Party, Indonesian Islamic Union Party, and Islamic Education Movement With the combined results of the major Islamic-based parties, Ka'bah Party proclaimed itself as the Great House of the Islamic People.

Mintaredja became the chairman of the Muslim Students' Association (Indonesia) starting on August 22, 1947, or 6 months after HMI was founded February 5, 1947.

Mintaredja's first cabinet position was when he was appointed Minister of State for Government Relations with the People's Consultative Assembly (MPR/DPR-GR) and the Supreme Council (DPA) in the First Development Cabinet. The cabinet was formed on June 6, 1968, and inaugurated on June 10, 1968. On September 9, 1971, or 66 days after the 1971 Indonesian legislative election, a cabinet reshuffle was held. Several ministers were dismissed or reassigned. Mintaredja was also among those reassigned, as his previous field of work was eliminated after the reshuffle. He assumed a new position as Minister of Social Affairs, replacing the previous official, Albert Mangaratua Tambunan.

Mintaredja became Chairman of Parmusi when the party was experiencing a sharp conflict within its ranks. At that time, there was a conflict between the Djarnawi Hadikusumo group and the Djaelani Naro group. In such a situation, both conflicting parties handed over the leadership of the party entirely to President Suharto. The President then intervened and resolved the problem by giving a party position to Mintaredja, a Muhammadiyah figure who was serving as a state minister at the time.

The government saw that both parties agreed with the policies taken by the president at that time. However, some consider that the events experienced by Parmusi were actually a form of intervention and engineering carried out by the New Order government against political parties, especially parties that carry religious aspirations (Islam), to control the life of the party. Mintaredja's appointment as chairman was also seen as making Parmusi merely an accommodator of government policies, a stark contrast to the ideals of its founders, who hoped Parmusi would become a critical reincarnation of the Masyumi Party. However, Mintaredja remained the party's leader until the party merged in 1973.

During Mintaredja's leadership, Parmusi participated in the 1971 Indonesian legislative election. At that time, the party received 2,930,746 votes (5.36%) and won 24 seats in the DPR, or the third largest after Golkar and Nahdlatul Ulama Party.

=== Minister of Social Affairs ===
Mintaredja's first term as Minister of Social Affairs was from September 9, 1971, to March 28, 1973, in the post-reshuffle First Development Cabinet. At that time, he was still serving as the leader of Parmusi

He held the position again in the Second Development Cabinet, from March 28, 1973, to March 29, 1978. One of the Ministry of Social Affairs' controversial initiatives during that period, specifically in 1974, was the introduction of a gambling system called "forecasting." The government even felt the need to send a team to England, where the system was first introduced, to study the gambling system. After two years of review, the Department of Social Affairs concluded that the forecast system is very simple and does not give the impression of mere gambling. However, the implementation of this idea, in the form of Porkas Football Prize Coupons, was only officially launched, distributed, and sold eleven years later, on December 28, 1985, when Mrs. Nani Soedarsono was the Minister of Social Affairs.

=== United Development Party (PPP) ===
Mintaredja, as chairman of the Indonesian Muslims' Party (PARMUSI), was one of five PPP declarants on January 5, 1973. The other four declarants were:

- Idham Chalid, Chairman of the Nahdlatul Ulama Party (NU)
- Anwar Tjokroaminoto, Chairman of the Indonesian Islamic Union Party (PSII)
- Rusli Halil, Chairman of the Islamic Education Movement (PERTI)
- Masjkur, Chairman of the United Development Party in the House of Representatives (DPR) faction.

Subsequently, Idham Chalid, from Nahdlatul Ulama (NU), the most dominant group within the United Development Party (PPP), was appointed party president. This position was quite prestigious but less influential than Mintaredja's position as Chairman of the Central Executive Board (DPP). President Suharto also approved the newly formed PPP leadership and expressed his gratitude because the fusion of former Islamic parties had fulfilled the MPR's decree and was implemented effectively democratic.

The next confrontation occurred during the 1977 Indonesian legislative election. At that time, there was coercion on the people by the military and civilian authorities to vote for Golkar, accompanied by violence against PPP campaigners. However, the election results were quite satisfactory because the PPP won 29 seats, meaning there were 5 additional seats compared to the previous election from parties that later merged into the United Development Party (PPP). The party even achieved a psychologically significant victory by defeating Golkar in the Special Capital Region of Jakarta and even securing an absolute majority in Aceh (formerly a stronghold of the Islamic Education Association).

Mintaredja's last position in government after he was not re-elected as a minister in the Third Development Cabinet. The country where he served as ambassador until 1983 was Turkey.

== Publications ==
Throughout his life, Mintaredja wrote several books. The books, listed by year of publication, include:

- 1968: Government and the Formation of the Indonesian Muslims' Party. Djakarta.
- 1968: The Struggle of the Muslim Community Experiences a 25-Year Setback. Djakarta.
- 1971: Reflections on the Renewal of Thought: Islamic Society and Politics in Indonesia. Jakarta: Permata.
- 1974: A Reflection and Revision of Ideas: Islam and Politics. Islam and State in Indonesia. Siliwangi.
- 1975: Rationalism versus Faith: Faith, Knowledge, and Deeds. Jakarta: Septenarius.
- 1976: Islam and Politics, Islam and the State in Indonesia: A Reflection and Renewal of Thought. Jakarta: Septenarius.
- 1977: The Young Generation from Age to Age. Jakarta: Septenarius.
- 1977: Married Life and the Hajj. Tunas Jaya.

In his books, Mintaredja's moderate views on Islam are evident. He was an early critic of the desire to establish an Islamic state. This was not only because the Indonesian nation is diverse, but also because, according to him, there is no strong basis in the Qur'an and Hadith for establishing such a state. Mintaredja also criticized the Masyumi which placed too much emphasis on ideological issues and ignored economic and welfare issues which were actually equally important. Apparently, this view was what enabled Mintaredja to enter the inner circle of the New Order (Indonesia) government, at least in its early periods.

== Personal life ==
Mohammad Syafaat Mintaredja is married to Siti Romlah and had several children. His first child, Evac Syafruddin Mintaredja, decided not to follow in his father's footsteps and chose to start his career from the bottom. He became Head of the Media Bureau at the Ministry of State Secretariat under Vice President Jusuf Kalla. Evac's son, Arie Syafriandi Mintaredja, also chose to become an entrepreneur, down to the fourth generation, Alvaro Rafi Syafaat Mintaredja. The Mintaredja family is also related to the family of the 4th President of Indonesia, Abdurrahman Wahid. Gus Dur who was also the founder of the National Awakening Party.

== Honours ==
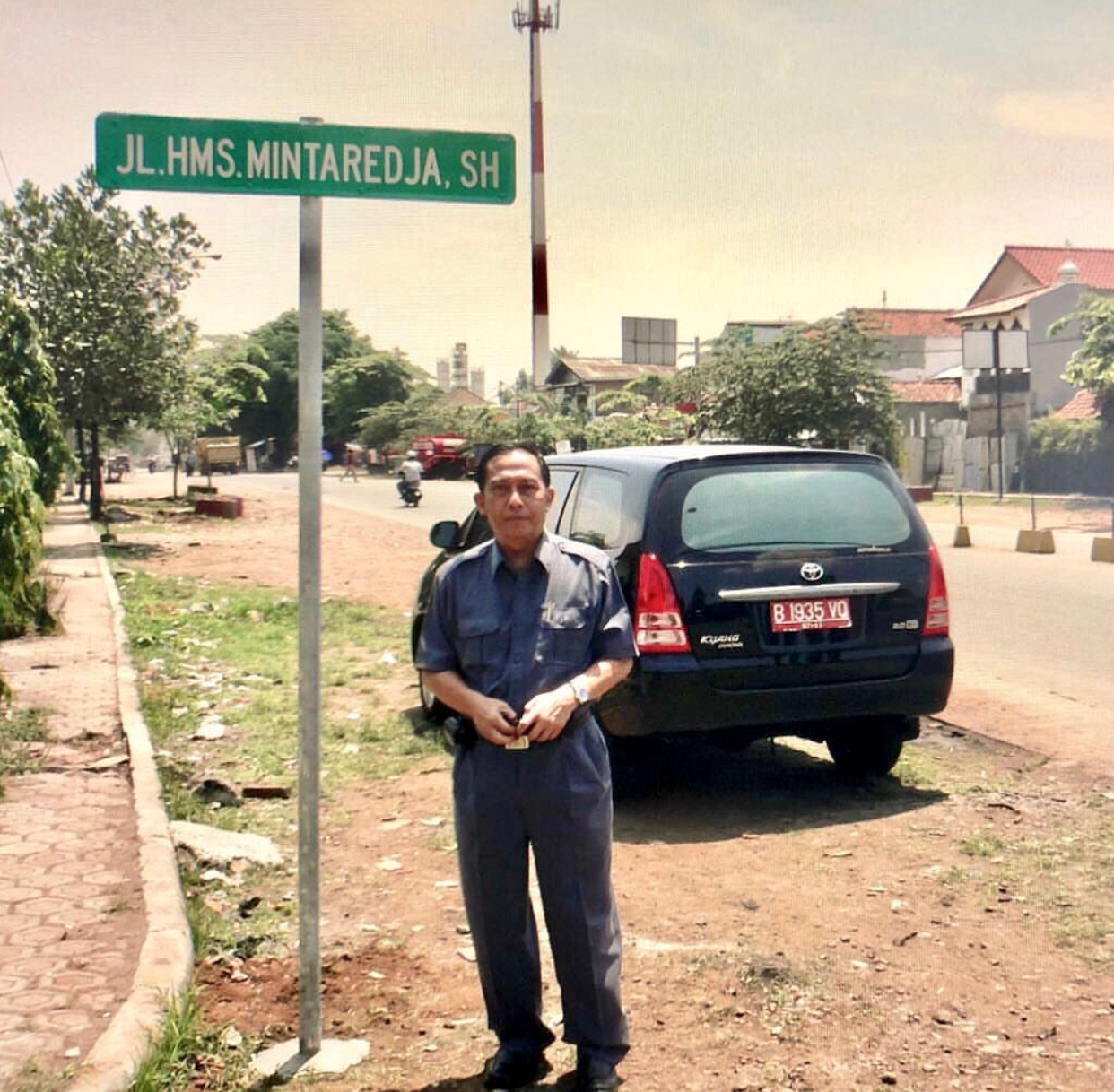
Evac Mintaredja on Jl.H.M.S. Mintaredja, S.H.

On 10 November 2006, the Government of Cimahi renamed ten streets in Cimahi City after local heroes. One of them, Jalan Akses Tol Baros (Baros Toll Access Street), was changed to Jalan HMS Mintaredja (HMS Mintaredja Street) to honor Mintaredja.

Political offices
Preceded by Office established	Minister of State for Relations between the Government and the MPR, DPR-GR, and DPA; 6 June 1968 – 9 September 1971	Office abolished
Preceded by Albert Mangaratua Tambunan	Ministry of Social Affairs; 9 September 1971 – 29 March 1978	Succeeded by Sapardjo
Party political offices
Preceded by Djarnawi Hadikusumo	Chairman of the Indonesian Muslims' Party; 20 November 1970 – 5 January 1973	Office abolished
Preceded by Office established	Chairman of the United Development Party; 5 January 1973 – 13 February 1978	Succeeded by Djaelani Naro
Diplomatic posts
Preceded by Nurmanli Aman	Ambassador of Indonesia to Turkey; 8 November 1980 – 24 December 1983	Succeeded by Abdulrachim Alamsjah
