= Islamic Education Movement =

Islamic organization based in Indonesia

Union of Islamic Education
- Persatuan Tarbiyah Islamiyah
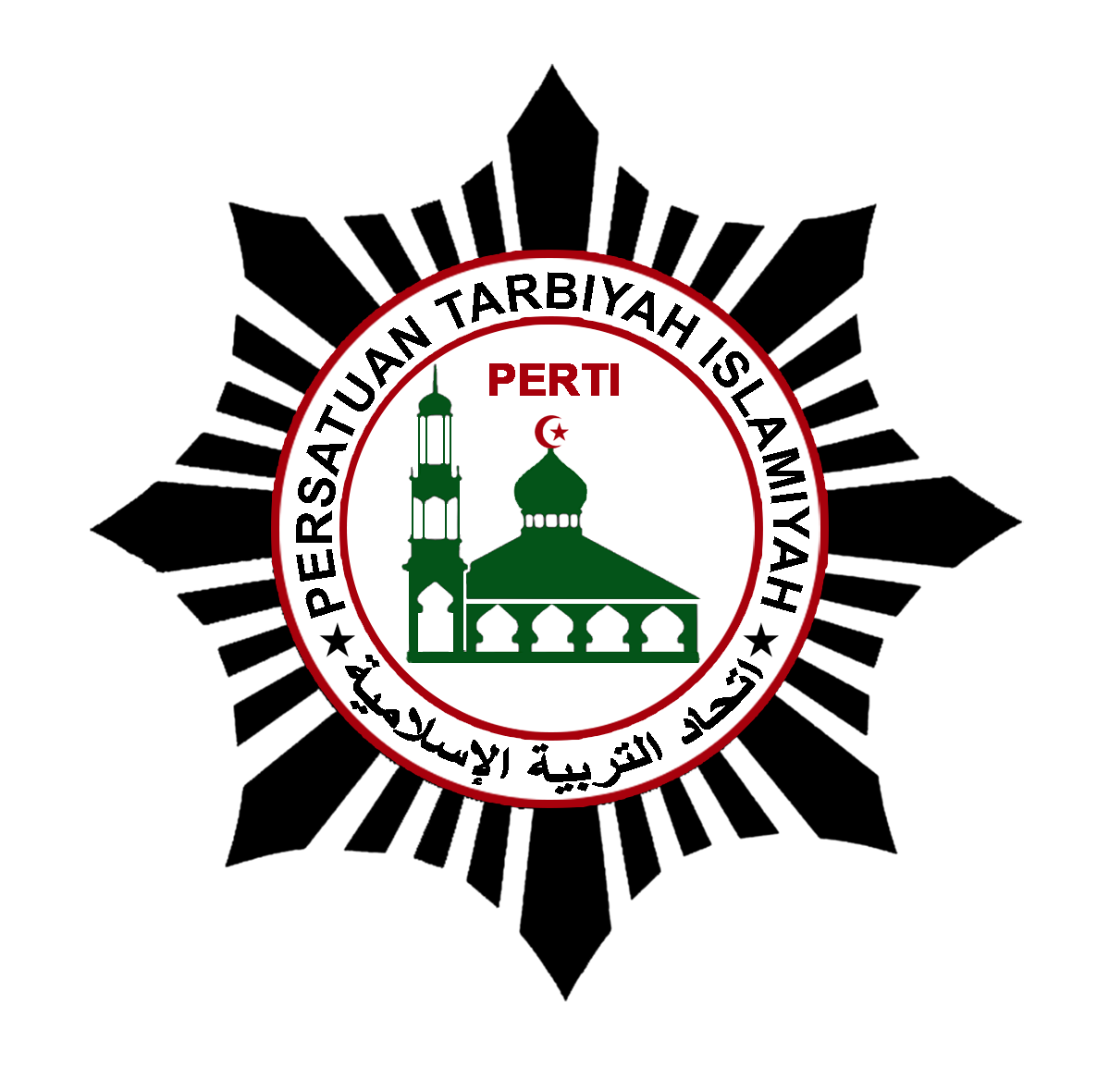
- Formation: 5 May 1928 CE; 15 Dhu al-Qadah 1346 AH
- Type: Socio-religious organization
- Headquarters: Jl. Paseban Raya no. 11A, DKI Jakarta, Indonesia
- Region served: Indonesia
- Chairman: Syarfi Hutauruk
- Secretary-general: Drs. Zulhendri Chaniago, MM
- Affiliations: Islamic Traditionalism (Sunni Islam)

Union of Islamic Education (Indonesian: Persatuan Tarbiyah Islamiyah, Jawi: ڤرستوان تربيه اسلاميه; Arabic: اتحاد التربية الإسلامية Ittiḥād at-Tarbiyah al-Islāmīyah), also known as PERTI, is an Islamic organization in Indonesia. The organization was founded by Sulaiman ar-Rasuli on May 5, 1928, in Candung, West Sumatra. In its development, PERTI had become a political party and gained four People's Representative Council (DPR-RI) seats and seven Constituent seats in 1955 general election.

== History ==
=== Early period ===
The organization was founded as Persatuan Madrasah Tarbiyah Islamiyah (Union of Islamic Education Schools) on May 5, 1928, by Sulaiman ar-Rasuli at Canduang, Agam, West Sumatra. The organization was initially created as a union of madrasas founded by kaum tua (traditionalist) clerics in Minangkabau to compete with modernist schools like Sumatera Thawalib. Sulaiman ar-Rasuli reformed his surau as Madrasah Tarbiyah Islamiyah (MTI) Canduang, an act that was followed by other kaum tua ulama such as Muhammad Jamil Jaho and Abdul Wahid Saleh. The organization saw itself as a successor of Ittihad Ulama Sumatra (Union of Sumatran Clerics) founded by Muhammad Saad Mungka in 1921 and a continuation of educational modernization led by Abbas Qadhi, another traditionalist cleric who modernized his surau in Bukittinggi earlier in 1918.

Around 1928–1937, the organization changed its name several times. One of these names is Persatuan Islam Indonesia (Indonesian Islamic Union) which caused the organization became under the surveillance of Dutch East Indies government. In 1937, Persatuan Tarbiyah Islamiyah (Union of Islamic Education, PERTI), a name suggested by Rusli Abdul Wahid, was chosen as the new name of the organization. In 1938, Sirajuddin Abbas, son of Abbas Qadhi, was elected as the chairman of PERTI.

=== As a political party ===
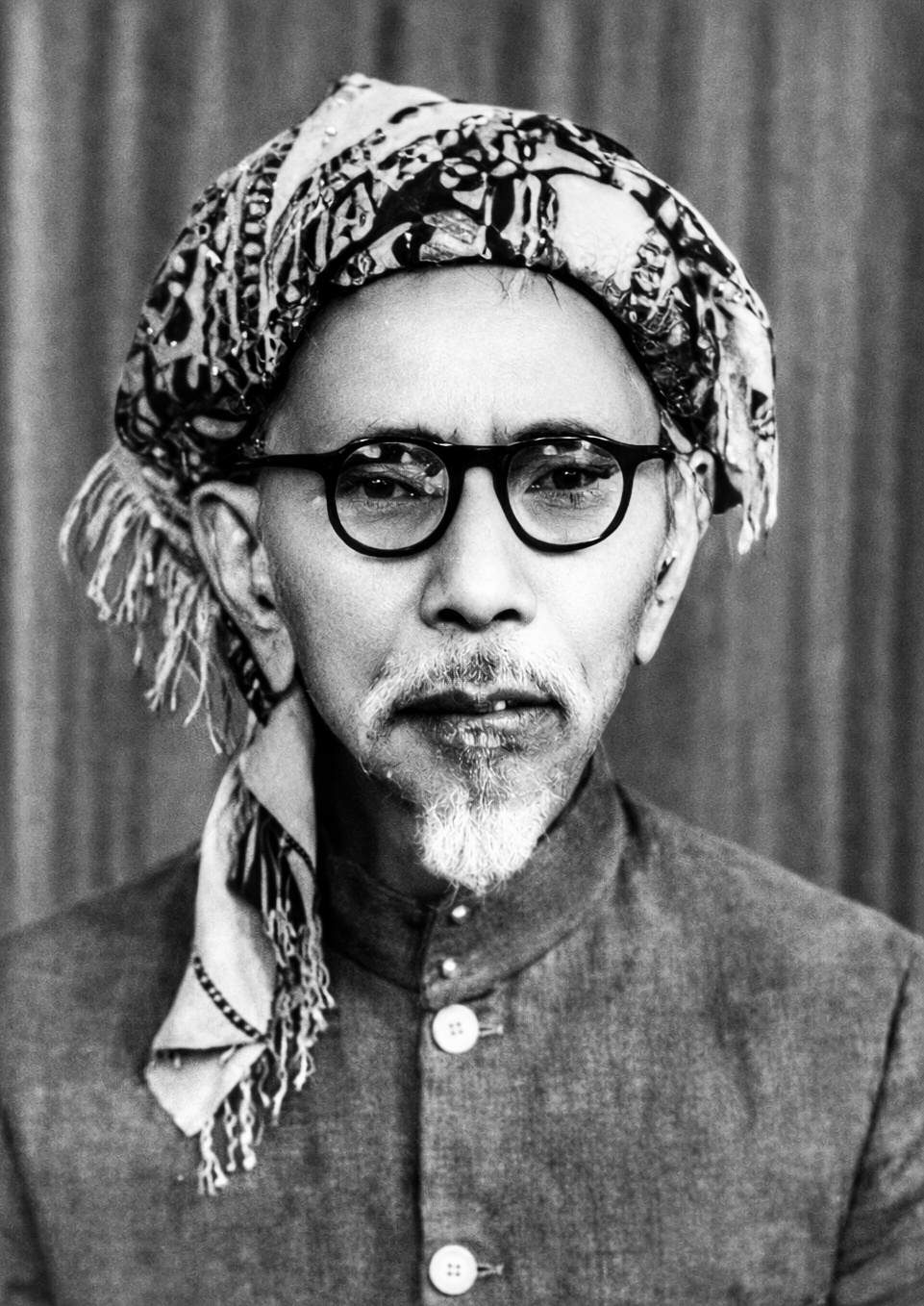
Sulaiman ar-Rasuli, founder of PERTI

PERTI initially participated in politics by joining Gabungan Politik Indonesia (GAPI) and giving its opinion on statehood to the Visman Commission in 1939. In 1943 during the Japanese occupation of the Dutch East Indies, leaders of PERTI joined High Islamic Council (MIT) in Bukittinggi, an Islamic organization consisted of both traditionalist and modernist ulama in Sumatra.

At the PERTI conference on November 22, 1945, it was decided that PERTI transformed into a political party. In 1950, Sirajuddin Abbas was chosen as Chairman of the Supreme Party Council, Rusli Abdul Wahid was chosen as Chairman of the Central Governing Council, and Sulaiman Ar-Rasuli was appointed as the Chairman of the Central Advisory Council. In 1952, PERTI together with Nahdlatul Ulama (NU), Indonesian Islamic Union Party, and Darud Da'wah wal Irsyad founded Liga Muslimin Indonesia.

In the 1955 legislative election, PERTI came tenth nationally, with 1.3 percent of the vote, winning four seats in the 257-seat People's Representative Council, three from Central Sumatra and one from North Sumatra and Aceh. Party leader Siradjuddin Abbas was elected to the legislature. Three months later, it won a slightly smaller share of the vote in the Constituent Assembly election, resulting in the party obtaining seven of the 514 seats in the Constitutional Assembly, which was tasked with drawing up a permanent constitution. In the electoral district of Central Sumatra, where its central office was based, it came second to the Masyumi Party. In the 1971 legislative election, it won only 0.70 percent of the vote and two seats in the legislature.

Election	Total seats won	Total votes	Share of votes
1955 (legislature)	4 / 257	483,014	1.28%
1955 (Constitutional Assembly)	7 / 514	465,359	1.23%
1971	2 / 360	381,309	0.69% (Note: Excluding Sirajuddin faction in Golkar.)

Two PERTI leaders were appointed as ministers of state during Sukarno's reign: Sirajuddin Abbas as Minister of Public Welfare and Rusli Abdul Wahid as Minister of General Affairs and West Papua.

=== Split ===
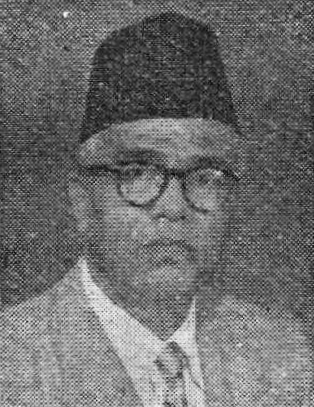
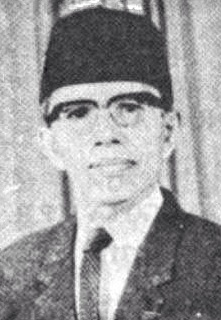
Sirajuddin Abbas (left) and Rusli Abdul Wahid (right), two prominent politicians of PERTI

On May 1, 1965, Rusli Abdul Wahid took full control of PERTI as Rais Am, with Rusli Halil as the chairman of the party. The transition of leadership was challenged by Sirajuddin Abbas and Baharuddin Arrasuli. As a result, PERTI was divided between Rusli faction and Sirajuddin faction. In order to quell the dispute, Sulaiman ar-Rasuli on March 1, 1969, issued a call to return to nonpolitical roots of PERTI in Khitah 1928. The call, however, could not calm the conflict.

During the earlier days of Suharto's New Order regime, Sirajuddin faction adopted the name Tarbiyah in 1969 and became a staunch supporter of Golkar. On the other hand, Rusli faction retained the PERTI acronym and became an independent political party until its merger into the United Development Party (PPP) in 1973.

=== Unification ===
The unification between two factions finally achieved through a muktamar islah (reconciliation conference) in Jakarta on October 21–23, 2016. Based on the muktamar result, Basri Bermanda from Tarbiyah (ex-Golkar) was elected as chairman, while Mohammad Faisal Amin from PERTI (ex-PPP) was appointed as deputy chairman.

On October 23–25, 2022, Muhammad Syarfi Hutauruk was chosen as the new chairman. During the organization's anniversary on May 5, 2023, in Padang, Hutauruk stated that PERTI as an organization is no longer affiliated to any political parties.

== Ideology and community ==
PERTI is widely known as a kaum tua (traditionalist) organization which adheres Shafi'i in jurisprudence and Ash'ari in creed. PERTI acknowledged Sufi orders with some of its members and supporters are followers of Naqshbandi and Shattari order.

The Islamic Education Union was established in West Sumatra, then spread to several regions in Indonesia such as Aceh, Riau, Jambi, and Bengkulu.

== Schools ==
The main support of PERTI as an institution of education lies in its madrasa network, known as Madrasah Tarbiyah Islamiyah (MTI). In 1939, more than 400 MTIs were established throughout the Dutch East Indies with the farthest reach to Lamakera, East Nusa Tenggara. Like pesantren in Java, MTI in the early days only taught Islamic subjects before it is supplemented with secular lessons since 1950s.
