= Parmusi =

Political party in Indonesia (1968–1973)

Indonesian Muslims' Party Partai Muslimin Indonesia
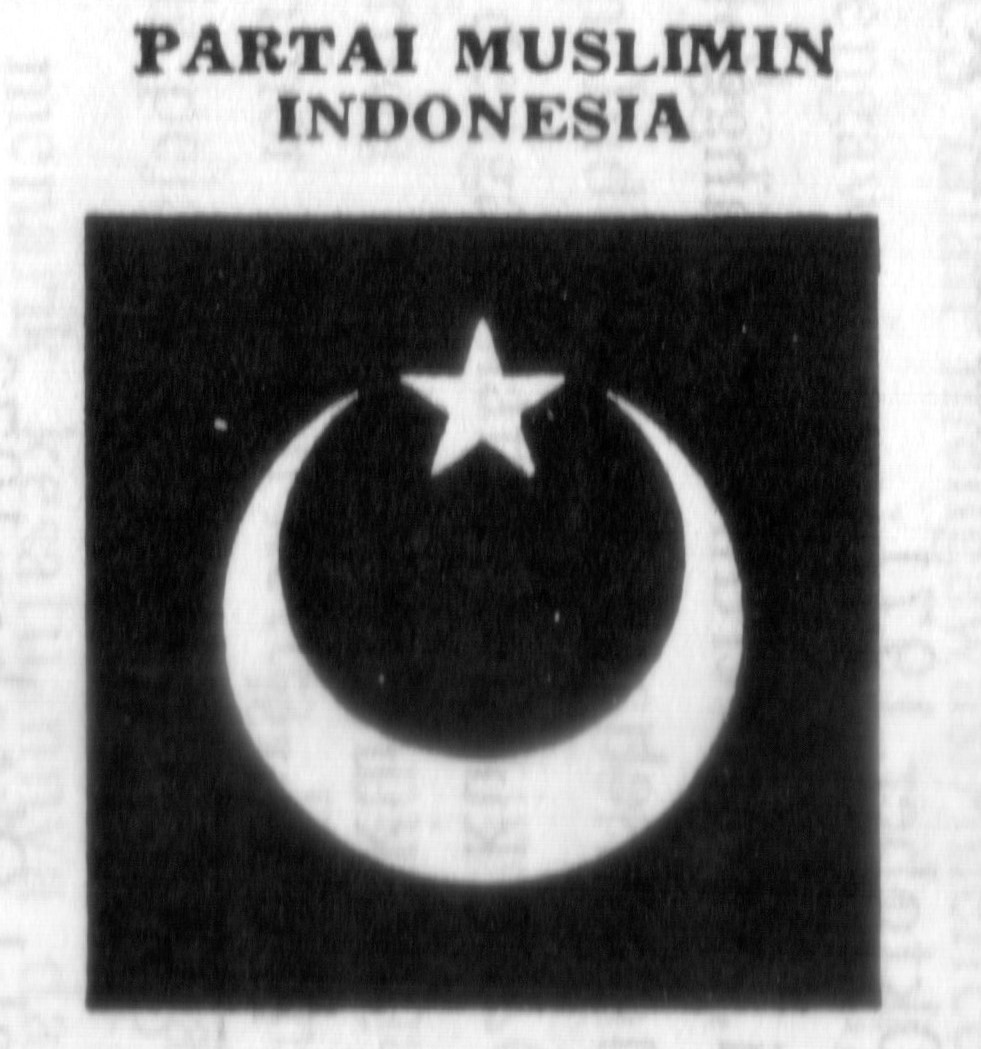
- Abbreviation: Parmusi
- Chairman: Djarnawi Hadikusuma (1968–1971); Mohammad Syafaat Mintaredja (1971–1973)
- Founded: 20 February 1968
- Dissolved: 5 January 1973
- Preceded by: Masyumi Party
- Merged into: United Development Party

The Indonesian Muslims' Party (Indonesian: Partai Muslimin Indonesia), better known by the syllabic abbreviation Parmusi, was an Islamic political party in Indonesia which existed from 1968 until 1973. Founded as the legal successor to the Masyumi Party, it came fourth in the 1971 Indonesian legislative election, winning 5.36% of the vote and 24 seats in the People's Representative Council. In 1973, Parmusi was merged into the United Development Party.

== History ==
=== Background ===
Following the 1945 Indonesian Declaration of Independence, the Masyumi Party was established to accommodate the interests of Muslims. It took the same name as the wartime organisation established by the occupying Japanese. In the 1955 Indonesian legislative election, Masyumi did not perform as well as had been expected, despite coming second, and the party began a period of decline. It subsequently became increasingly identified with dissent from non-Java Indonesia, the basis of most of its support. Fears of a Javanese-dominated Indonesia eventually led to open rebellion and the formation of the Revolutionary Government of the Republic of Indonesia in Sumatra. In November 1957, senior Masyumi figures Mohammad Natsir, Sjafruddin Prawiranegara and Burhanuddin Harahap, joined the rebels in the Sumatran city of Padang. The Masyumi Party refused to condemn their actions, which damaged the party's image In 1960, President Sukarno passed a law allowing him to ban parties whose ideologies conflicted with those of the state, or whose members rebelled against the state, and he subsequently used this law to ban Masyumi on 17 August 1960.

In the early hours of 1 October 1965, there was an attempted coup against the government of Sukarno subsequently blamed on the Communist Party of Indonesia (PKI). In December 1965, an organization called Badan Koordinasi Amal Muslimin (Muslim Charity Coordination Board) was set up. It included former Masyumi members, although most of the former leaders were still in jail. By the beginning of the following year, the organization was calling for the revival of the party. A second group, which included former Indonesian vice-president Mohammad Hatta, wanted to establish an entirely new Islamic party. In March 1966, Sukarno handed over authority to restore law and order to army head, and future president, General Suharto.

=== Establishment ===
In late 1966, the Army, now more powerful following the failure of the 1965 coup attempt, said that it would not support the reestablishment of Masyumi because of its rebellious past. The following month, army head, and future president General Suharto also spoke out against Masyumi. Those wanting to see a return of moderate Islam to Indonesian politics then decided to establish a new party to be known as the Muslim Party of Indonesia (Parmusi). In March 1967, Suharto was named acting president by the Provisional People's Consultative Assembly (MPRS). The following month he reaffirmed that he would not support the reestablishment of Masyumi. There then followed discussions with representatives of Suharto, as a result of which Masyumi figures were removed from the proposed leadership of the new party and Djarnawi Hadikusuma appointed overall party chairman. With the approval of Suharto, the party was officially established by government Decree No. 70/1968 on 20 February 1968.

=== Party activities ===
At the end of February 1968, Parmusi called for the MPRS to be convened to name Suharto president, rather than acting president, and for early elections to correct what it saw as its under-representation in the legislature. During the MPR session, held in March, at which Suharto was confirmed as president, Parmsui joined other Islamic parties to win concessions relating to Suharto's emergency powers, and secured a commitment to hold elections by July 1971. However it failed in its efforts to give legal force to the Jakarta Charter obliging Muslims to abide by Shariah law.

In November 1968, Parmusi held its first conference in Malang, East Java. Before the election, Suharto let it be known that he would prefer the election of a new leadership to only take place after the legislative elections. However, the warning was ignored and former Masyumi figure Mohammad Roem was elected chairman, while a number of other former Masyumi members were appointed to key positions. On the final day of the conference, the government announced that this represented a violation of the decree establishing the party, and that the new leadership could not therefore be recognised, leaving the party in a state of uncertainty, with the provisional 1968 leadership in place. The government then set about reducing the political influence and popularity of the party. Suharto's aide Ali Murtopo wanted to remove Parmusi chairman Djarnawi Hadikusuma, who was seen as too pro-Masyumi. Djarnawi refused to accept this, and Suharto stepped in to "mediate", subsequently issuing a decree replacing the party board and installing Mintaredja, who was a Parmusi member and minister of state in the cabinet, as chairman. Djawarni continued to oppose this move, but following pressure on him and the previous party leadership from Ali Murtopo and the National Intelligence Coordinating Agency (Bakin), on 12 April 1971, the old party board agreed that Mintaredja would be party chairman. This damaged the party's credibility and in the 1971 Indonesian legislative election, it won only 5.36% of the popular vote.

=== Dissolution ===
Two years after the victory of the New Order political vehicle Golkar in the elections, the government finally eradicated the previous political system and consolidated its power base by pressuring the existing parties to merge into just two. In January 1973, along with the other Islamic parties, Parmusi merged into the United Development Party (PPP). Parmusi's compliant leadership ensured that it was the most supportive participant in this merger, and Mintaredja became the first leader of the PPP. Parmusi thereby ceased to exist as a political party.
