= Traditionalism (Islam in Indonesia) =

Religious strand in Indonesia

In the context of Muslim society in Indonesia, traditionalism or traditionalist Islam refers to a religious strand which puts emphasis on preserving traditionally established local rituals and scholarship. Traditionalist Muslims refer to themselves as ahlussunnah wal-jamā'ah or aswaja. Traditionalism is often contrasted with the modernist strand, which is inspired by modernity and rationalism. Traditionalism has been the most adhered Muslim religious orientation in the history of contemporary Muslim Indonesia. The extent of traditionalism widely overlaps with the influence of a socio-religious organization Nahdlatul Ulama, the biggest Muslim organization in Indonesia. (Note: Approximately 40 to 60 million Muslims in Indonesia are affiliated with or influenced by Nahdlatul Ulama.) Traditionalism is also a critical element within the Muslim intellectual movement known as Islam Nusantara.

== Usage of the term ==
The division between "traditionalism" and "modernism" is widely used by both Indonesians and foreign academics to describe the chasm which has been existed among the contemporary Muslim society in Indonesia. Previously, Muslim society in Java in particular was analyzed through the division of abangan, santri and priyayi popularized by an anthropologist Clifford Geertz based on communal identity. However, this division has already been considered obsolete. Greg Barton of Monash University states that since the 1950s and 1960s, Indonesian society could be reasonably described based on the traditionalist-modernist dualism.

== Definition ==
Traditionalism is broadly defined by adherence toward four maddhabs (Islamic schools of jurisprudence) within the fiqh scholarship, especially the Shafi'i maddhab, and education based on pesantren, an Islamic boarding school system indigenous to the Indonesian archipelago. Traditionalism highly regards the position and guidance of ulamas (Muslim intellectual on religious issues) from the classical era, and local or communal kyais (an indigenous title for religious leaders). Traditionalists are also commonly understood as Muslims who are more accepting toward pluralism and interfaith tolerance. This understanding and the term itself, however, can be problematic as it doesn't always reflect the complex and diverse reality on the ground. Some other terms are often used in a similar context, notably "substantialist", "orthodox", "moderate", or "kaum tua". (Note: The term kaum tua means "older generation". This term is used in contrast with the term kaum muda which means "younger generation" for modernists. The kaum muda-kaum tua dichotomy was often used in the early 20th century West Sumatra.)

== History ==
Islam in Indonesia was initially spread through merchant activity by Arab traders as well as proselytization by Sufi saints. These Sufi missionaries, along with Shafi'i maddhab they brought in, could flexibly accommodate local practices and traditions. Local beliefs or practices of Hindu or animist origins were incorporated and became part of the traditions such as saint veneration known as Ziyarat, honorific title of kyai, or pesantren as an educational institution. Ulama and kyais, mostly wealthy landowners of rural area, were authoritative figures in this system, and santri (students) learned Islam through taqlid (rote learning) and kitab kuning. Distinct characteristics of traditionalism are based on such syncretism and rural communal dynamics.

From the late 19th to early 20th century, increasing numbers of Muslims have studied in the Middle East, where reformist thoughts such as Islamic modernism and Wahhabism were taking hold. These Muslims with reformist mindset, mostly highly educated urban dwellers, established the modernist organization Muhammadiyah in 1912, and advocated for purification of such traditions based on puritanical teachings derived from the Qur'an and Hadith alone. Local ulamas and kyais, threatened by such movements, have established Nahdlatul Ulama in East Java as a response (1929). Other notable traditionalist organizations included the Islamic Education Association (Perti) in West Sumatra (1930), and Nahdlatul Wathan in Lombok (1952). Among main Islamic political parties in Indonesia, only the United Development Party, the oldest of them, follows traditionalist Islam as an ideology.
