= Nahdlatul Ulama =

Sunni Islam movement in Indonesia

Nahdlatul 'Ulama
- نهضة العلماء
- The official emblem of the Nahdlatul Ulama as of the 33rd National Congress in 2015
- Formation: 31 January 1926; 100 years ago (16 Rajab 1344 A.H.)
- Founder: Hasyim Asyari
- Type: Socio-religious organization
- Headquarters: Jl. Kramat Raya no. 164, Jakarta, Indonesia
- Region served: Indonesia
- Members: 159 million (2024)
- Supreme leader: Miftachul Achyar
- Chairman: Abdul Hakim Mahfudz
- Secretary-general: Saifullah Yusuf
- Affiliations: Sunni Islam (Islamic Traditionalism)
- Website: www.nu.or.id

Nahdlatul Ulama (NU; Arabic: نهضة العلماء, lit. 'Revival of the Ulama', Indonesian pronunciation: [nahˈdatʊl ʊˈlama]) is an Islamic organization in Indonesia. Its membership numbered over 40 million in 2023, making it the largest Islamic organization in the world. NU is also a charitable body funding schools and hospitals while organizing communities to help alleviate poverty.

The NU was founded in 1926 by the ulema and merchants to defend both traditionalist Islamic practices (in accordance with Shafi'i school) and its members' economic interests. NU's religious views are considered "traditionalist" in that it accepts local cultural traditions that do not conflict with Islamic law (in contrast to Islamic fundamentalist groups). By contrast, the second largest Islamic organization in Indonesia, the Muhammadiyah, is considered "reformist" as it takes a more literal interpretation of the Qur'an and Sunnah.

Many leaders of Nahdlatul Ulama are ardent advocates of Islam Nusantara, a distinctive variety of Islam that has undergone interaction, contextualization, indigenization, interpretation, and vernacularization according to socio-cultural conditions in Indonesia. Islam Nusantara promotes moderation, anti-fundamentalism, pluralism, and a degree of syncretism. Some NU elders, leaders, and religious scholars, however, have rejected Islam Nusantara in favor of a more conservative approach.

== Ideology ==
Nahdlatul Ulama follows the Ashʿari and Maturidi schools, taking the middle path between aqli (rationalist) and naqli (scripturalist) tendencies. The organization identifies the Quran, the Sunnah, and the abilities of the mind coupled with empirical reality as the sources of its thought. It attributes this approach to earlier thinkers such as Abu al-Hasan al-Ash'ari and Abu Mansur al-Maturidi in the field of theology.

In the field of jurisprudence, it recognizes the Hanafi, Maliki, Shafi'i, and Hanbali schools of law, but relies in practice on Shafi'i teachings. Regarding Sufism, NU follows the path of al-Ghazali and al-Junayd al-Baghdadi. It has been described by Western media as a progressive, liberal, and pluralistic Islamic movement, but is a diverse organization with large conservative factions, as well.

The Nahdlatul Ulama has stated that it is not tied to any political organization.

The Nahdlatul Ulama believe that Islam should remain a religion and not be a vehicle for political radicalization. In a Wall Street Journal article, NU's president, Kyai Haji Abdurrahman Wahid, wrote, "The essence of Islam is encapsulated in the words of the Quran, “For you, your religion; for me, my religion.” That is the essence of tolerance. Religious fanatics—either purposely or out of ignorance—pervert Islam into a dogma of intolerance, hatred and bloodshed."

== History ==
=== Origin ===
NU was established in 1926 as an organization for orthodox Ash'ari Muslims scholars, as opposed to the modernist policies of the Muhammadiyah and PERSIS (organization), and the rise of Salafi movement of the Al-Irshad Al-Islamiya organization in Indonesia, which rejected local customs influenced by pre-Islamic Javanese Hindus and Buddhist traditions at all. The organization was established after The Committee of Hijaz had fulfilled its duty and about to be dissolved. The organization was established by Hasyim Asy'ari, the head of an Islamic religious school in East Java. The organization expanded, but the base of its support remained in East Java. By 1928, the NU was using the Javanese language in its sermons, alongside Arabic.

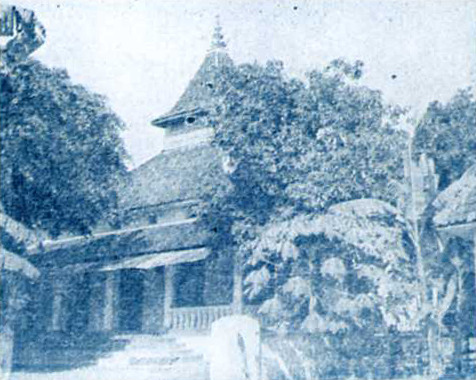
The Jombang Mosque, birthplace of the Nahdlatul Ulama

In 1937, despite poor relations between the NU and other Sunni Islam organizations in Indonesia, the organizations established the Supreme Islamic Council of Indonesia (Indonesian: Majlis Islam A'laa Indonesia, MIAI) as a discussion forum. They were joined by most of the other Islamic organizations in existence at the time. In 1942, the Japanese occupied Indonesia and in September a conference of Islamic leaders was held in Jakarta.

The Japanese wanted to replace the MIAI, but the conference not only decided to maintain the organization, but also elected political figures belonging to the PSII to the leadership, rather than members of the non-political NU or Muhammadiyah as the occupiers had wanted. Just over a year later, the MIAI was dissolved and replaced by the Japanese-sponsored Masyumi (Consultative Council of Indonesian Muslims). Hasjim Asjari was the notional chairman, but in practice the new organization was led by his son, Wahid Hasyim. Other NU and Muhammadiyah figures held leadership positions.

In 1945, Sukarno and Hatta declared Indonesian independence, which NU supported.

During the early months of the Indonesian National Revolution the NU declared on October 22, 1945, that the fight against the Dutch colonial forces was a holy war, obligatory for all Muslims of the nation (this day is since 2015 honored as National Santri Day). Among the guerrilla groups fighting for independence were Hizbullah and Sabillilah, which were led by the NU.

NAHDLATUL ULAMA RESOLUTION
to all members in Java and Madura Islands

In the Name of God, the Most Gracious and Merciful:

The Regional Leaders and Representatives of Nahdlatul Ulama, assembled in Surabaya, East Java, in general session of the Java-Madura Conference of the aformentioned on 21–22 October 1945, hereby declare that:

Given that the testimonies and speeches given from representatives from Java and Madura revealed the huge desire of the Muslim Ummah and Ulama of these regions and in the areas of the aforementioned to defend and uphold both religion and the sovereignty of the newly independent Republic of Indonesia, declared on the 17th of August of this year, against foreign aggression, during the duration of this Conference,

considering that the defense of Republic of Indonesia according to the laws of the Islamic Religion as thus a obligation for every Muslim in accordance with Islamic doctrine, and that Muslims constitute the majority of the citizenry of the young Republic,

and considering the following realities faced by the Muslim community:

Whereas, That the Dutch (NICA) and the Japanese who came and were here in the lands of the Republic carried out many crimes and atrocities which disturbed the peace,

Whereas, That everything they did was done with the intention of violating the sovereignty of the independent Republic of Indonesia and the freedom of religion, and wanting to restore their former colonial possessions, there have been battles that have sacrificed many lives in many places of the republic,

Whereas, these battles were mostly carried out by members of the Muslim community who felt obliged according to their religious laws to defend the independence of their country and religious freedom,

And whereas, in dealing with all these incidents, in accordance with our response, we have not received concrete orders and demands from the Government of the Republic of Indonesia on that matter.

NOW THEREFORE, WE HEREBY ORDER AND RECOMMEND THE FOLLOWING:

First, For the NU to urgently request the Government of the Republic of Indonesia to determine a real and commensurate attitude and action towards efforts, especially towards the Dutch and their allies and supporters at home and overseas, that will endanger religious freedom and the independence of the Indonesian nation, and second, for the NU to continue the "sabilillah" struggle for the establishment of the independent Republic of Indonesia and Islam.

Resolved in Surabaya on the 22th day of October, 1945

(SGD.) THE NAHDLATUL ULAMA

=== Transformation into Islamic political party ===
Nahdlatul Ulama
- Abbreviation: NU
- Leader: Wahid Hasyim (first); Idham Chalid (last)
- Founded: 1952 (as political party)
- Dissolved: 5 January 1973
- Split from: Masyumi
- Merged into: United Development Party
- Headquarters: Jakarta, Indonesia
- Newspaper: Duta Masjarakat
- Youth wing: Ansor Youth Movement
- Ideology: Islamic traditionalism Conservatism; Social conservatism
- Political position: Centre-right to right-wing
- National affiliation: Indonesian League of Muslims

Party flag

Following the recognition of Indonesian independence, a new party called Masyumi was established with the NU as a component of it. The NU leadership at the time had no political skills, and was awarded few influential cabinet positions, with the exception of chairman Wahid Hasyim, who was appointed religious affairs minister. The NU was unhappy with its lack of influence within Masyumi, especially after a decision at the 1949 party conference changed the party's religious council, on which the NU held several positions, into a powerless advisory body.

Two years later, a dispute over the organization of the Haj pilgrimage led to Prime Minister Natsir's opposition to the reappointment of Hasyim as religious affairs minister in the next cabinet. In the ensuing cabinet crisis, the NU made a series of demands, including the retention of Hasyim, and threatened to leave Masyumi. On 5 April 1952, a few days after the announcement of a new cabinet without Hasyim, the NU decided in principle to leave Masyumi. Three months later it withdrew all its members from Masyumi councils, and on 30 August it established the Indonesian League of Muslims, comprising the NU, PSSI and a number of smaller organizations. It was chaired by Hasyim.

During the liberal democracy era (1950–1957), NU members served in a number of cabinet posts. In the first Ali Sastroamidjojo Cabinet, the NU held three seats, with Zainul Arifin appointed second deputy prime minister. However, following the fall of this cabinet, some NU members were opposed to the NU joining the new cabinet, to be formed by Burhanuddin Harahap Cabinet, believing that if he was unable to form a cabinet, the NU would be invited to try. It was finally pressured into participating, and was awarded the interior and religious affairs portfolios in the cabinet, which was sworn in on 12 August 1955.

On 29 September 1955, Indonesia held its first parliamentary elections. The NU came in third, with almost 7 million votes, 18.4% of the total, behind the Indonesian National Party and Masyumi. It was awarded 45 seats in the People's Representative Council, up from only eight before the election. The NU was the largest party in its East Java base, and 85.6% of its vote came from Java. There was a clear division between Masyumi, representing outer-island, urban voters and the NU, representing the rural Javanese constituency. Three months later, elections were held for the Constitutional Assembly, which was tasked with drawing up a permanent constitution. The results were very similar, with the NU winning 91 of the 514 seats.

In the 1950s, the NU still wanted to see Indonesia become an Islamic state, and expressed its disapproval of a 1953 presidential speech in which Sukarno rejected this. Three years later, it also argued against Sukarno's "conception" that would eventually lead to the establishment of guided democracy, as this would mean PKI members sitting in the cabinet. On 2 March 1957, the Permesta rebellion broke out. Among its demands was the restoration of Mohammad Hatta to the vice-presidency. The NU supported these calls.

Meanwhile, in the Constitutional Assembly, the NU joined Masyumi, the Indonesian Islamic Union Party (PSII), the Islamic Education Movement (Perti) and other parties to form the Islamic Block, which wanted Indonesian to become an Islamic state. The block made up 44.8% of total seats. However, with none of the blocks able to command a majority and push through the constitution it wanted, the assembly failed to agree and was dissolved by Sukarno in a decree on 5 July 1959 that also restored the original 1945 Constitution, which declared the state to be based on the Pancasila philosophy, not Islam.

In 1960, President Sukarno banned Masyumi for alleged involvement in the Permesta rebellion. However, the leadership of NU saw the pro-poor Communist Party of Indonesia, which was close to Sukarno, as an obstacle to its ambitions, and competed with it to win support from the poor. Five years later, the coup attempt by the 30 September Movement took place. In 1965, the group took sides with the General Suharto-led army and was heavily involved in the mass killings of Indonesian communists. However, the NU later began to oppose Suharto's regime.

In 1984, Abdurrahman Wahid, the grandson of NU founder Hasyim Asy'ari, inherited the leadership from his father, and was later elected President of Indonesia in 1999. He formally apologized for NU's involvement in the events of 1965. He also stated that "Nadhatul Ulama (NU) is like Shiite minus Imamah; similarly Shiite is NU plus Imamah." There have been many similarities between the two, such as the position and role of kyai. The main contrast between them is that in NU, the concept is visible in the form of accepted culture, while in Shia, it takes the form of theology.

Following the deposing of Sukarno, the New Order regime under President Suharto held elections in 1971. Despite manipulation of the NU by the government, which caused it to lose much credibility, the NU managed to maintain its 18% share of the vote from the 1955 poll. However, in 1973, it was obliged to "fuse" into the new United Development Party (Indonesian: Partai Persatuan Pembangunan, PPP). The PPP came second, after the government sponsored Golkar organization in the elections of 1977 and 1982, but in 1984, the new NU chairman Abdurrahman Wahid (also known as Gus Dur), the son of Wahid Hasyim, withdrew the NU from the PPP because of dissatisfaction with the NU's lack of influence. As a result, in the 1987 election, the PPP vote collapsed from 28% in 1982 to only 16%. From then on, it was expected that the NU would concentrate on religious and social activities.

==== People's Representative Council ====
Election date	Party leader	Seats	Seat change	Votes	% of votes	Outcome of election
1955	Abdul Wahab Hasbullah	45 / 257		6,955,141	18.41%	Governing coalition
1971	Idham Chalid	58 / 360	▲13	10,213,560	18.67%	Governing coalition

==== Constitutional Assembly ====
Election date	Party leader	Seats	Votes	% of votes	Bloc
1955	Abdul Wahab Hasbullah	91 / 514	6,989,333	18.47%	Islamic Bloc

=== Outside politics ===
In 1984, the New Order government announced that all organizations would have to accept state ideology Pancasila as their basis. Once again the NU was accommodating, with Gus Dur calling Pancasila a "noble compromise" for Muslims. Five years later. Gus Dur was reelected for a second five-year term as chairman, a position he held until being elected president in 1999.

In 1990, the NU worked with Bank Summa to establish a system of rural banks. Suharto did not approve of the NU straying beyond purely religious activities, and the fact the bank was owned by a Christian ethnic-Chinese family led to controversy. The bank was eventually shut down two years later because of financial mismanagement. Gus Dur also incurred the disapproval of the regime by holding a mass rally at a Jakarta stadium three months before the 1992 legislative elections, ostensibly to express support for Pancasila.

This resulted in Gus Dur being invited to meet Lt. Col. Prabowo Subianto, Suharto's son-in-law at Jakarta Military Headquarters. At the meeting, Gus Dur was warned to avoid unacceptable political conduct, and told that if he insisted in involving himself in politics, rather than confining himself to religious matters, he should express support for a further presidential term for Suharto. In response, Gus Dur threatened to leave the NU. This resulted in the regime backing down, as it could not risk bringing Gus Dur down.

=== Post-New Order era ===
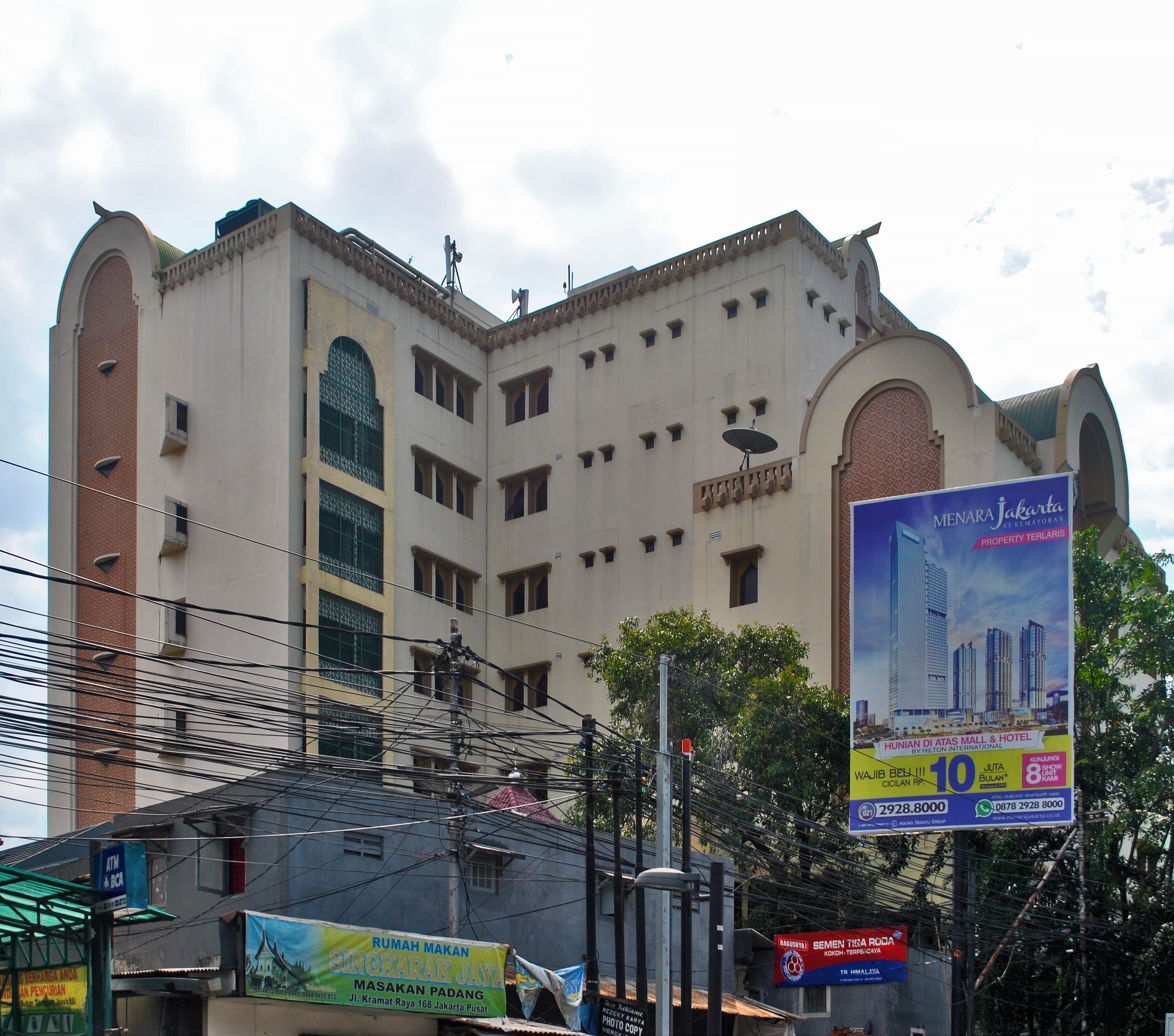
Nahdlatul Ulama headquarters in Jakarta

During the fall of Suharto, Nahdlatul Ulama members and Islamic clerics were killed by rioters in Banyuwangi in East Java when a witchhunt against alleged sorcerers spiralled out of control. Following the fall of Suharto and his replacement by Vice-president B. J. Habibie, in July 1998 Gus Dur announced the establishment of the National Awakening Party (Indonesian: Partai Kebangkitan Bangsa, PKB). On 10 November, Gus Dur met with other pro-reform figures Amien Rais, Megawati Sukarnoputri and Sultan Hamengkubuwono. The so-called Ciganjur Four, named after the location of Gus Dur's house, issued a declaration calling the Habibie administration "transitional" and calling for elections to be brought forward and for the Indonesian Military to end its political role.

In Indonesia's first free elections since 1955, held on 7 June 1999, the PKB won 13 percent of the vote. In the ensuing session of the People's Consultative Assembly, Gus Dur was elected President of Indonesia, defeating Megawati by 373 votes to 313. However, he was deposed just two years later. The PKB subsequently split into two warring factions, one led by Gus Dur's daughter, Yenny Wahid. An attempt in 2008 by Gus Dur to involve President Susilo Bambang Yudhoyono in resolving the dispute failed, and the PKB vote in the 2009 elections was half that of the previous vote in 2004. At its 2010 conference, held in Makassar, the NU decided not to discuss the split, and passed a resolution banning officials from holding political posts, seen as a commitment to avoiding future political involvement.

After the conference, concerns about the longer term role of the NU continued to attract comment in the national media. During 2011, for example, there was continuing discussion about the national role that the NU should play and about the close political links between the NU and the National Awakening Party (PKB). Comments by Yenny Wahid, for example, reflected these concerns when she said that the NU was fragmenting and "sliding into irrelevance".

== Aims ==
The NU exists to spread Islamic teaching. As well as preaching, it undertakes educational activities through its network of 6,830 Islamic boarding schools (or pesantren). It also owns 44 universities; is involved in economic and agricultural studies; and provides social services such as family planning. Its goal is "to spread messages about a tolerant Islam in their respective countries to curb radicalism, extremism and terrorism," which, it claims, "often spring from a misinterpretation of Islamic teachings."

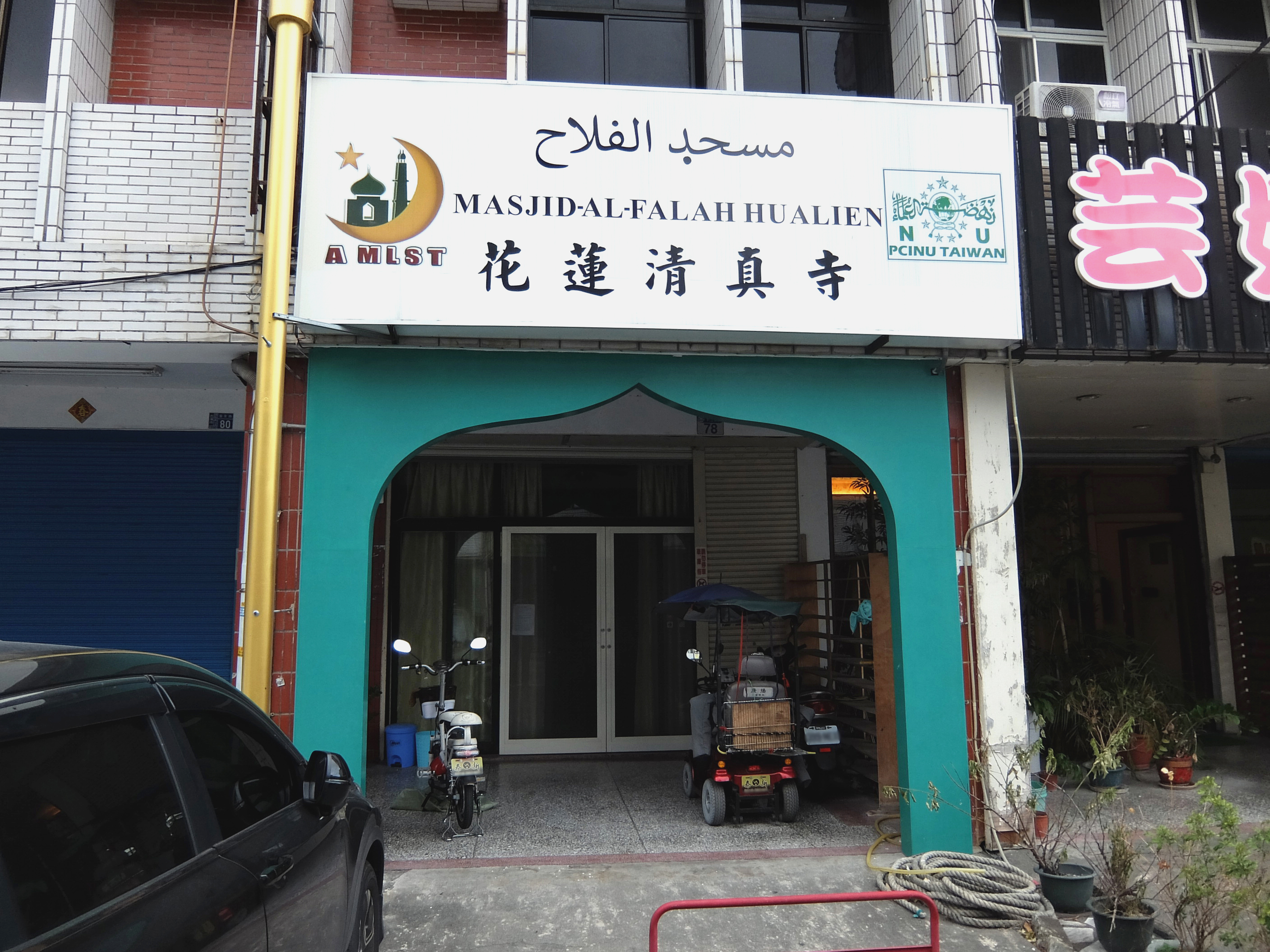
The NU-sponsored Hualien Al-Falah Mosque in Taiwan.

In December 2014, NU launched a global campaign against extremism and jihadism. Alongside NU theologians, the group built a prevention center in Indonesia to train Arabic-speaking students to combat jihadist rhetoric. Additionally, NU created a joint program with the University of Vienna entitled VORTEX (Vienna Observatory for Applied Research on Radicalism and Extremism). The project is funded by the Indonesian Ministry of Internal Security. It also launched an American nonprofit organization called Bayt ar-Rahmah in Winston-Salem, North Carolina. On the other hand, Nahdlatul Ulama leaders gave a fatwa in favor of female genital mutilation (FGM). In 2019, NU called for the abolishment of the term "kafir" to describe non-Muslims.

== Leaders ==
The highest body in the NU is its Syuriah (Supreme Council). Under this is the Tanfidziyah (Executive Council); the Mustasyar (Advisory Council) provides input to both. At the 2010 NU Conference, Sahal Mahfudh was elected chairman of the Executive Council, and thus serves as executive chief. At the same conference, Sahal Mahfudz was elected chair of the Supreme Council for the 2010-2015 period. Under the Executive Council, there are province-level Regional Boards, autonomous bodies, institutes, and committees, with the structure extending down to Sub-Branch Representative Council Boards in villages.

== See also ==
- Al-Baqara 256 "there is no compulsion in religion"
- Liberalism and progressivism within Islam
- Islam Nusantara
- Darul Uloom Deoband
- Barelvi a South Asian traditionalist movement formed in reaction to Deobandism
- 1998 East Java ninja scare— a massive series of lynchings triggered by assassinations of Nahdlatul Ulama leaders
