= Islam in Indonesia =

Islam in Indonesia Agama Islam di Indonesia
- Istiqlal Mosque, the national mosque of Indonesia and the largest mosque in Southeast Asia.

Total population
- ▲251,257,898 (2025); 87.15% of the population

Religions
- Majority Sunni Islam

Languages
- Liturgical: Quranic Arabic; Common; Indonesian (official), Indonesian Arabic, various regional languages

Related ethnic groups
- Javanese, Sundanese, Malay, Madurese, Minangkabau, Acehnese, and other ethnic groups of Indonesia

Mass Eid al-Fitr prayer at the national Istiqlal Mosque in Jakarta, Indonesia; the largest mosque in Southeast Asia

Islam is the largest religion in Indonesia, with 87.15% of the Indonesian population identifying themselves as Muslims, based on civil registry data in 2025. In terms of population, the country has the world’s largest Muslim population, with an overwhelming 251.25 million people of the country. The Pew Research Center estimated that Sunni comprised approximately ~99% of the country's Muslim population in 2011, with the remaining 1% being Shia, who are concentrated around Jakarta, and about 400,000 Ahmadi as well.

In terms of schools of jurisprudence, based on demographic statistics, 99% of Indonesian Muslims mainly follow the Shafi'i madhhab, smaller numbers follow other schools, and the Salafi movement, although when asked, 56% do not adhere to any specific school. The Sunni orders of Sufism are considered essential. Trends of thought within Islam in Indonesia can be broadly categorized into two orientations: "modernism", which closely adheres to orthodox theology while embracing modern learning, and "traditionalism", which tends to follow the interpretations of local religious leaders and religious teachers at Islamic boarding schools (pesantren). There is also a historically important presence of a syncretic form of Islam known as kebatinan, particularly in Java.

Islam in Indonesia is considered to have gradually spread through merchant activities by Arab Muslim traders, adoption by local rulers, and the influence of Sufism since the 12th or the 13th century. During the late colonial era, it was adopted as a rallying banner against colonialism. A 2023 Pew Research Center report gave 93% of the adult Indonesian population identifying themselves as Muslim. Today, although Indonesia has an overwhelming Muslim majority, it is not an Islamic state, but constitutionally a Ketuhanan yang Maha Esa (One Almighty God) state whose government officially recognizes six formal religions. (Note: The government officially recognizes six religions: Islam, Protestantism, Roman Catholicism, Hinduism, Buddhism, and Confucianism; although the government also officially recognizes Indonesian indigenous religions named believe at one almighty god.)

== Distribution ==
Map showing the religious distribution in the districts of Indonesia (2022), Islam represents the spiritual faith of 87.02% of Indonesians

Muslims in each regency of Indonesia

Islam in Indonesia by ethnic groups (2010)
1. Javanese (44.7%)
2. Sundanese (17.6%)
3. Malay (4.17%)
4. Madurese (3.46%)
5. Betawi (3.19%)
6. Minangkabau (3.11%)
7. Buginese (3.06%)
8. Bantenese (2.24%)
9. Banjarese (1.98%)
10. Batak (1.81%)
11. Acehnese (1.64%)
12. Sasak (1.52%)
13. Others (11.8%)

=== Islam in Indonesia by province and region ===
This is a data table of the percentage of Muslims in Indonesia, provided by the Ministry of Religious Affairs for 2022:

| Province | Muslim population | Total population | Muslim percentage |
|---|---|---|---|
| Aceh (Highest Percentage of Muslims) | 5,356,635 | 5,432,312 | 98.61% |
| Bali | 434,941 | 4,304,574 | 10.1% |
| Bangka Belitung Islands | 1,344,903 | 1,490,418 | 90.24% |
| Banten | 11,686,756 | 12,321,660 | 94.85% |
| Bengkulu | 2,017,860 | 2,065,573 | 97.69% |
| Central Java | 36,773,442 | 37,783,666 | 97.33% |
| Central Kalimantan | 2,011,763 | 2,706,950 | 74.32% |
| Central Papua | 162,740 | 1,348,463 | 12.07% |
| Central Sulawesi | 2,450,867 | 3,099,717 | 79.07% |
| East Java | 40,179,566 | 41,311,181 | 97.26% |
| East Kalimantan | 3,446,652 | 3,941,766 | 87.44% |
| East Nusa Tenggara | 523,523 | 5,543,239 | 9.44% |
| Gorontalo | 1,191,484 | 1,215,387 | 98.03% |
| Highland Papua (Lowest Population and Percentage of Muslims) | 27,357 | 1,459,544 | 1.87% |
| Jakarta | 9,491,619 | 11,317,271 | 83.87% |
| Jambi | 3,514,415 | 3,696,044 | 95.09% |
| Lampung | 8,598,009 | 8,947,458 | 96.09% |
| Maluku | 997,724 | 1,893,324 | 52.70% |
| North Kalimantan | 533,675 | 726,989 | 73.41% |
| North Maluku | 1,005,727 | 1,346,267 | 74.70% |
| North Sulawesi | 849,253 | 2,666,821 | 31.85% |
| North Sumatra | 10,244,655 | 15,372,437 | 66.64% |
| Papua | 320,442 | 1,073,354 | 29.85% |
| Riau | 5,870,015 | 6,743,099 | 87.05% |
| Riau Islands | 1,671,242 | 2,133,491 | 78.33% |
| South Kalimantan | 4,054,044 | 4,178,229 | 97.03% |
| South Papua | 143,610 | 522,844 | 27.47% |
| South Sulawesi | 8,359,166 | 9,300,745 | 89.88% |
| South Sumatra | 8,508,999 | 8,755,074 | 97.19% |
| Southeast Sulawesi | 2,593,226 | 2,707,061 | 95.79% |
| Southwest Papua | 230,904 | 604,698 | 38.19% |
| West Java (Highest Population of Muslims) | 48,029,215 | 49,339,490 | 97.34% |
| West Kalimantan | 3,320,719 | 5,497,151 | 60.41% |
| West Nusa Tenggara | 5,361,920 | 5,534,583 | 96.88% |
| West Papua | 213,230 | 559,361 | 38.12% |
| West Sulawesi | 1,217,339 | 1,450,610 | 83.92% |
| West Sumatra | 5,528,423 | 5,664,988 | 97.59% |
| Special Region of Yogyakarta | 3,433,129 | 3,693,834 | 92.94% |

| Region | Muslim population | Total population | Muslim % |
|---|---|---|---|
| Java | 149,593,727 | 155,767,102 | 96.04% |
| Kalimantan | 13,366,853 | 17,051,085 | 78.39% |
| Lesser Sunda Islands | 6,320,384 | 15,382,396 | 41.09% |
| Maluku Islands | 2,003,451 | 3,239,591 | 61.84% |
| Sumatra | 52,655,156 | 60,300,894 | 87.32% |
| Sulawesi | 16,661,335 | 20,440,341 | 81.51% |
| Western New Guinea | 1,098,283 | 5,568,264 | 19.72% |

== Denominations ==
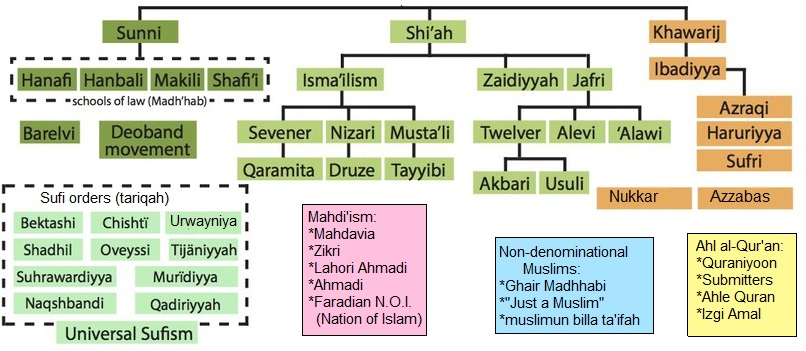
Many diverse Islamic denominations are practised within Indonesia.

The Islamic schools and branches in Indonesia reflect the activity of Islamic doctrines and organizations operating in Indonesia. In terms of denomination, Indonesia is a majority Sunni country (about 98–99%) with minority of other sects such as Shia Islam and Ahmadiyya. In terms of Islamic schools of jurisprudence, the Shafi'i school is dominant in Indonesia at large; smaller numbers follow other schools (madhhabs), and the Salafi movement. Proliferation of the Shafi’i school is considered to be due to Arab merchants from the southern Arabian Peninsula who followed this school of jurisprudence. The Sunni orders of Sufism are considered essential.

=== Division of Islam in Indonesia ===
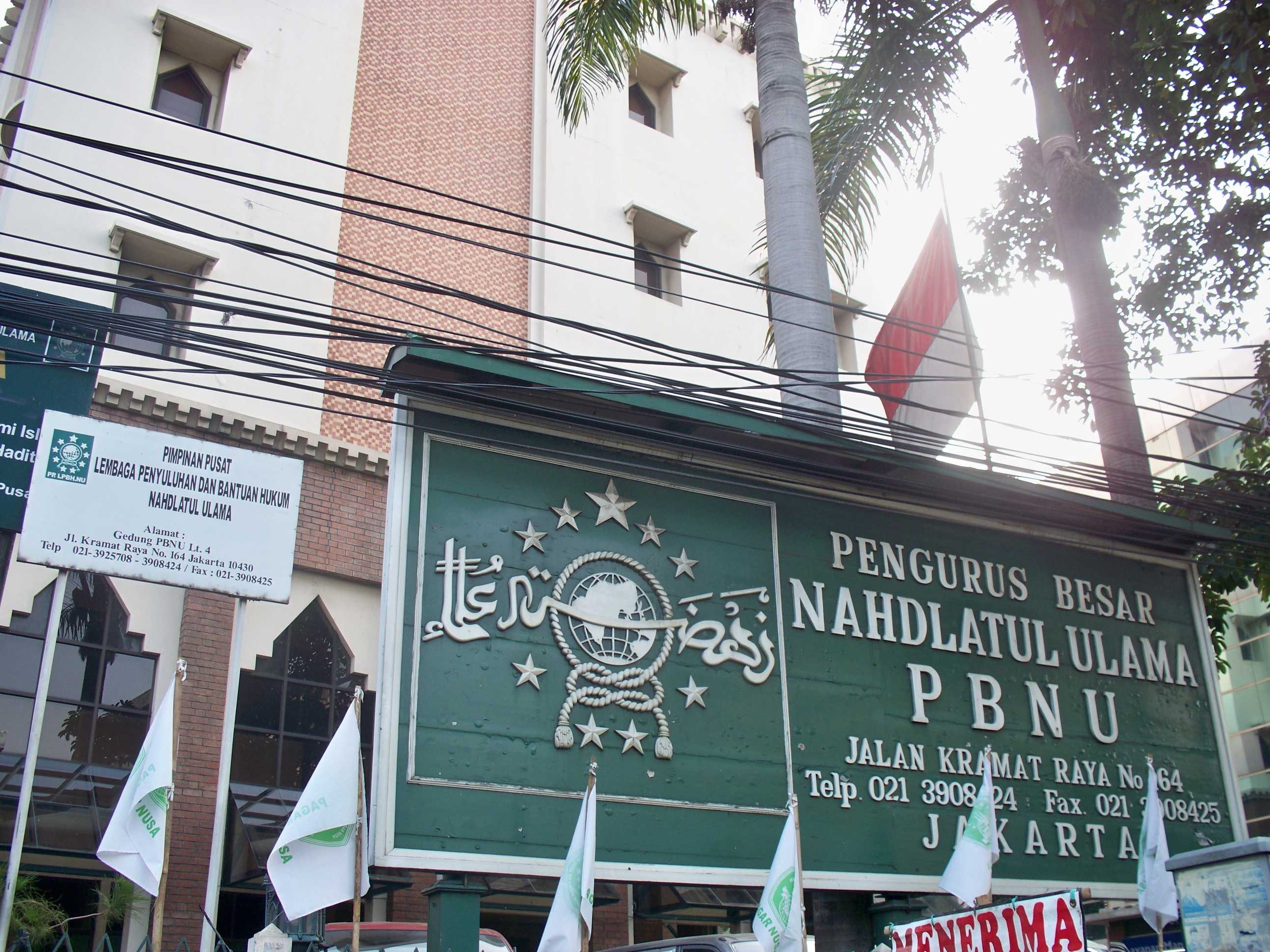
The headquarters of Nahdlatul Ulama, an influential traditionalist Sunni Islam movement in the country.

Classical documentations divide Indonesian Muslims between "nominal" Muslims, or abangan, whose lifestyles are more oriented toward non-Islamic cultures, and "orthodox" Muslims or santri, who adhere to the Orthodox Islamic norms. Abangan was considered an indigenous blend of native and Hindu-Buddhist beliefs with Islamic practices sometimes also called Javanism, kejawen, agama Jawa, or kebatinan. On Java, santri was not only referred to a person who was consciously and exclusively Muslim, but it also described persons who had removed themselves from the secular world to concentrate on devotional activities in Islamic schools called pesantren—literally "the place of the santri". The terms and precise nature of this differentiation were in dispute throughout the history, and today it is considered obsolete.

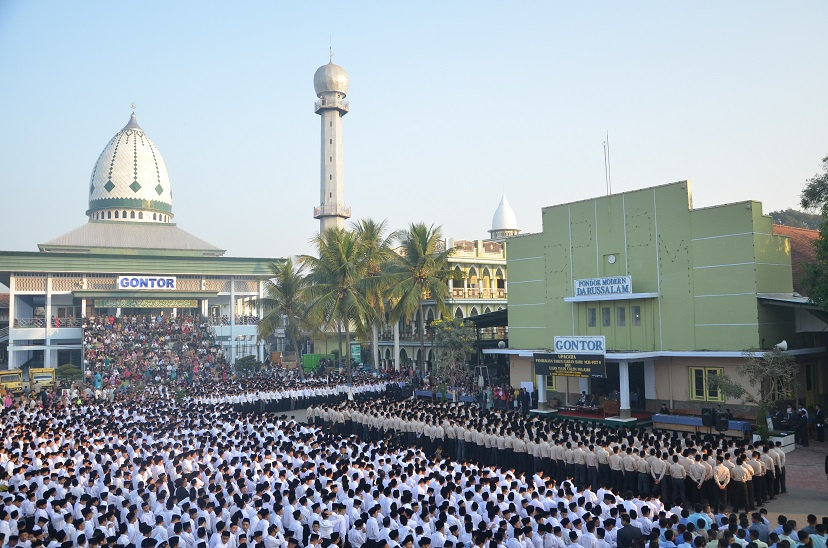
Pondok Modern Darussalam Gontor. is the Pesantren (Indonesian islamic boarding school) where santri (muslim students) stay and study Islamic teachings and other knowledges.

In the contemporary era, distinction is often made between "traditionalism" and "modernism". Traditionalism, exemplified by the civil society organization Nahdlatul Ulama, is known as an ardent advocate of Islam Nusantara, a distinctive brand of Islam that has undergone interaction, contextualization, indigenization, interpretation, and vernacularization in line with socio-cultural conditions in Indonesia. Islam Nusantara promotes moderation, compassion, anti-radicalism, inclusiveness, and tolerance. On the other spectrum is modernism, which is heavily inspired by Islamic Modernism, and the civil society organizations Muhammadiyah and Persis are known ardent proponents. Modernist Muslims advocate for Islamic reform in Indonesia, which is perceived as having deviated from the historical Islamic orthodoxy. They emphasize the authority of the Qur'an and the Hadiths, and oppose syncretism and taqlid to the ulema. This division, however, also has been considered an oversimplification in recent analysis.

More recent currents of Islamic thoughts that have taken roots include Islamism. Today, the leading Islamic political party in Indonesia is Prosperous Justice Party (PKS), which is known for serving as a regional wing of Muslim Brotherhood movement in Indonesia. The Islamist Al-Zaytun Islamic Boarding School in West Java is considered the largest pesantren/madrasa in Southeast Asia.

=== Kebatinan ===
Various other forms and adaptations of Islam are influenced by local cultures that hold different norms and perceptions throughout the archipelago. The principal example is a syncretic form of Islam known as kebatinan, which is an amalgam of animism, Hindu-Buddhist, and Islamic—especially Sufi—beliefs. This loosely organized current of thought and practice was legitimized in the 1945 constitution, and in 1973, when it was recognized as one of the agama, President Suharto counted himself as one of its adherents. The Kebatinan or Kepercayaan has no certain prophet, sacred book, nor distinct religious festivals and rituals; it has more to do with each adherent's internalized transcendental vision and beliefs in their relations with the supreme being. As a result, there is inclusivity in that the kebatinan believer could identify themselves with one of six officially recognized religions, at least in their identity card, and still maintain their kebatinan belief and way of life. Kebatinan is generally characterized as mystical, and some varieties were concerned with spiritual self-control. Although many varieties were circulating in 1992, kebatinan often implies pantheistic worship because it encourages sacrifices and devotions to local and ancestral spirits. These spirits are believed to inhabit natural objects, human beings, artifacts, and grave sites of important wali (Muslim saints). Illness and other misfortunes are traced to such spirits. If sacrifices or pilgrimages fail to placate angry deities, the advice of a dukun or healer is sought. Kebatinan, while it connotes a denial of the militant universalism of orthodox Islam, moves toward a more internalized universalism. In this way, kebatinan moves toward eliminating the distinction between the universal and the local, the communal and the individual.

=== Other branches ===
A small minority subscribe to the Shia Islam and Ahmadiyya. Both Shia and Ahmadi Muslims have been facing increasing intolerance and persecutions by reactionary and radical Islamic groups.

Currently, there are approximately 1–3 million Shia Twelvers most of whom are concentrated around Jakarta, also in Java, Sumatra, Madura and Sulawesi islands, and also Ismailis in Bali, which approximates 0.5% or more than 1% of the total Muslim population. The historical Shia community is considered a descendant of the minority segment of Hadhrami immigrants, and it was spread from Aceh, originally a center of Shia Islam in Indonesia. In the contemporary era, interests toward Shia Islam grew after the Iranian Islamic Revolution, since which a number of Shia publications were translated into Indonesian.

Another minority Islamic sect is Ahmadiyya. The Association of Religion Data Archives estimates that, within Jamaah Muslim Ahmadiyah Indonesia (JMAI), there are around 400,000 Ahmadi Muslims in Indonesia, which equates to 0.2% of the total Muslim population, spread over 542 branches across the country. Ahmadiyya history in Indonesia began since the missionary activity during the 1920s established the movement in Tapaktuan, Aceh. A separatist group, Lahore Ahmadiyya Movement for the Propagation of Islam, known as Gerakan Ahmadiyah-Lahore Indonesia (GAI) in Indonesia, has existed in Java since 1924 and had only 708 members in the 1980s.

=== Organizations ===
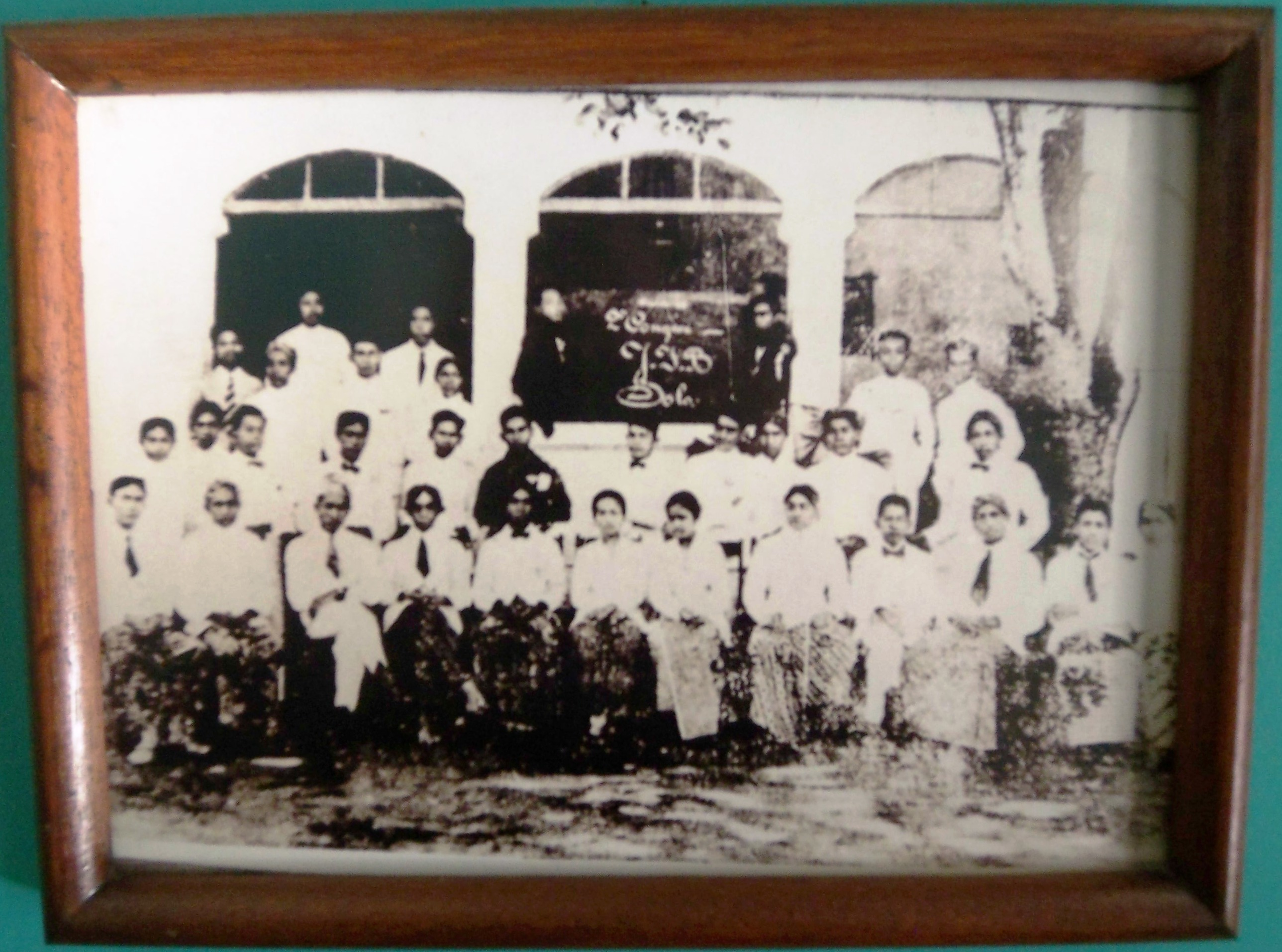
Jong Islamieten Bond (Young Muslim Union) delegates in Youth Pledge. Batavia, 1928

In Indonesia, civil society organizations have historically held distinct and significant weight within the Muslim society. These various institutions have contributed greatly to both the intellectual discourse and public sphere for the culmination of new thoughts and sources for communal movements. 60% of 200 million Indonesian Muslims identify either as Nahdlatul Ulama or Muhammadiyah, making these organizations a 'steel frame' of Indonesian civil society.

Nahdlatul Ulama (NU), the largest traditionalist organization, focuses on many of the activities such as social, religious and education and indirectly operates a majority of the country's Islamic boarding schools. Claiming 40 to 60 million followers, NU is Indonesia's largest organization and perhaps the world's largest Islamic group. Founded in 1926, NU has a nationwide presence but remains strongest in rural Java. It follows the ideology of Ahle Sunnah wal Jamaah with Sufism of Imam Ghazali and Junaid Bagdadi. Many NU followers give great deference to the views, interpretations, and instructions of senior NU religious figures, alternatively called Kyais or Ulama. The organization has long advocated religious moderation and communal harmony. On the political level, NU, the progressive Consultative Council of Indonesian Muslims (Masyumi), and two other parties were forcibly streamlined into a single Islamic political party in 1973—the United Development Party (PPP). Such cleavages may have weakened NU as an organized political entity, as demonstrated by the NU withdrawal from active political competition, but as a popular religious force, NU showed signs of good health and a capacity to frame national debates.

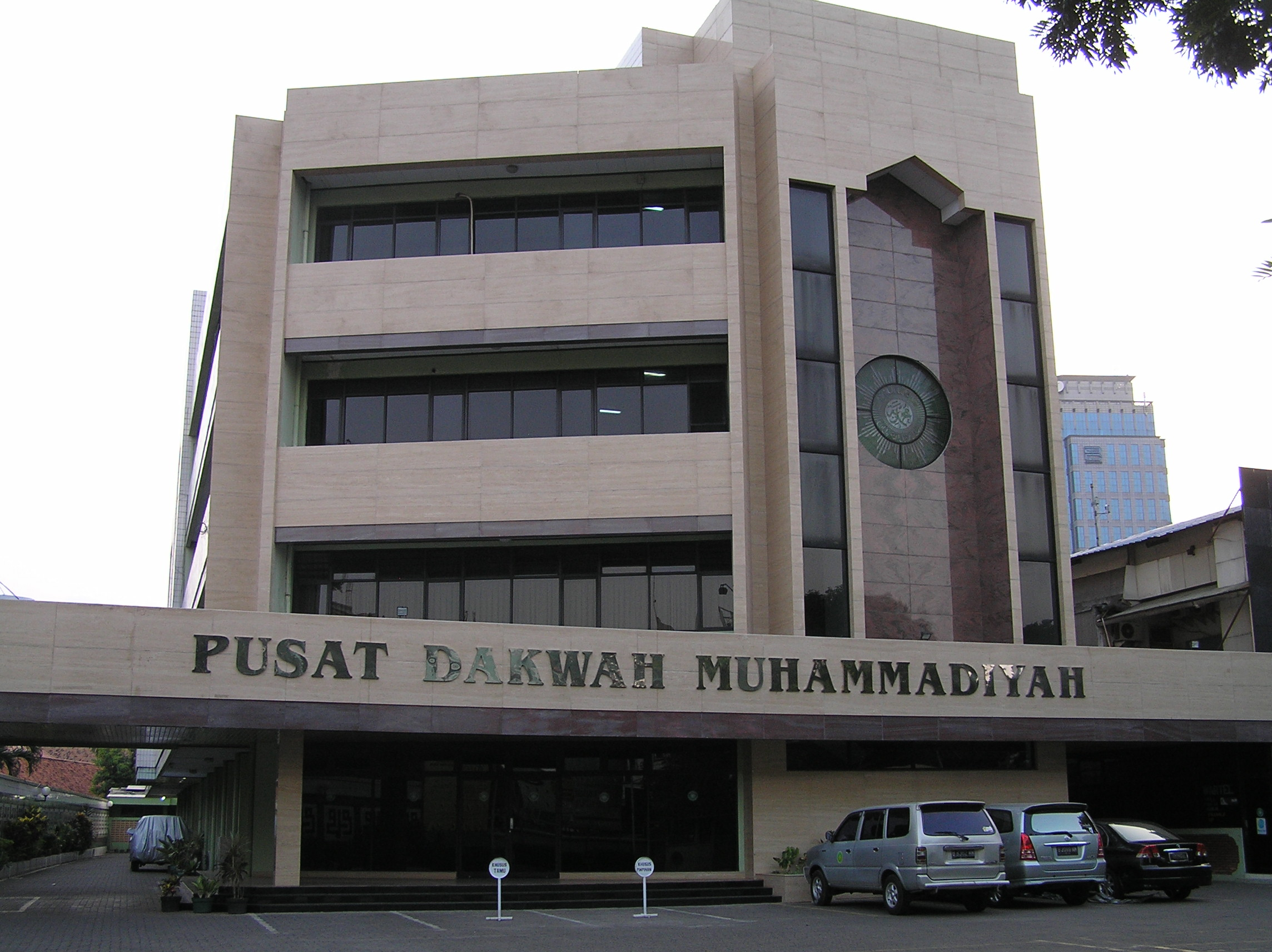
Muhammadiyah head office in Jakarta. It is the second largest Muslim organisation in Indonesia.

The leading national modernist social organization, Muhammadiyah, has branches throughout the country and approximately 29 million followers. Founded in 1912, Muhammadiyah runs mosques, prayer houses, clinics, orphanages, poorhouses, schools, public libraries, and universities. On February 9, Muhammadiyah's central board and provincial chiefs agreed to endorse a former Muhammadiyah chairman's presidential campaign. This marked the organization's first formal foray into partisan politics and generated controversy among members.

Many Indonesian mosques asserted their particular attachment to the Nahdlatul Ulama or the Muhammadiyah.

Some smaller Islamic organizations cover a broad range of Islamic doctrinal orientations. At one end of the ideological spectrum lies the controversial Islam Liberal Network (JIL), which aims to promote a pluralist and more liberal interpretation of Islamic thinking.

Equally controversial are groups at the other end of this spectrum such as Hizbut Tahrir Indonesia (HTI), which advocate a pan-Islamic caliphate and the full implementation of Shari'a, the Indonesian Mujahedeen Council (MMI), which advocates implementation of Shari'a as a precursor to an Islamic state, and the sometimes violent Islamic Defenders Front (FPI). Countless other small organizations fall between these poles. Another small organization, the Indonesian Islamic Propagation Institute (LDII), continues to grow.

== History ==
=== Spread of Islam (12th century – 1602) ===
There is evidence of Arab Muslim traders entering Indonesia as early as the 8th century. However, it was not until the end of the 13th century that the spread of Islam began. At first, Islam was introduced through Arab Muslim traders, and then the missionary activity by scholars. It was further aided by the adoption by the local rulers and the conversion of the elites. The missionaries had originated from several countries and regions, initially from India (i.e. Gujarat) and Southeast Asia (i.e. Champa, Vietnam), and later from the southern Arabian Peninsula (i.e. Hadhramaut, Yemen).

The first evidence of Indonesian Muslims comes from northern Sumatra. In 1111, some local Acehnese were converted by an Arab called 'Abd-Allah 'Arif. One of his disciples, Burhan al-Din spread Islam as far as Pariaman at Minangkabau region in West Sumatra.

In the 13th century, Islamic polities began to emerge on the northern coast of Sumatra. Marco Polo, on his way home from China in 1292, reported at least one Muslim town. The first evidence of a Muslim dynasty is the gravestone, dated AH 696 (1297 AD), of Sultan Malik al Saleh, the first Muslim ruler of Samudera Pasai Sultanate. By the end of the 13th century, Islam had been established in Northern Sumatra.

In general, local traders and the royalty of major kingdoms were the first to adopt the new religion. The spread of Islam among the ruling class was precipitated as Muslim traders married the local women, with some of the wealthier traders marrying into the elite ruling families. After local rulers and the royals had adopted Islam, their subjects mirrored their conversion. Although the spread was slow and gradual, the limited evidence suggests that it accelerated in the 15th century, as the military power of Malacca Sultanate in the Malay Peninsula and other Islamic Sultanates that dominated the region were aided by episodes of Muslim coup such as in 1446, wars and superior control of maritime trading and ultimate markets.

By the 14th century, Islam had been established in northeast Malaya, Brunei, the southwestern Philippines, and among some courts of coastal East and Central Java, and by the 15th century, in Malacca and other areas of the Malay Peninsula. The 15th century saw the decline of the Hindu Javanese Majapahit Empire, as Muslim traders from Arabia, India, Sumatra and the Malay Peninsula, and also China began to dominate the regional trade that was once controlled by Javanese Majapahit traders. Chinese Ming dynasty provided systematic support to Malacca. Ming Chinese Zheng He's voyages (1405 to 1433) is credited for creating Chinese Muslim settlement in Palembang and north coast of Java. Malacca actively encouraged the conversion to Islam in the region, while Ming fleet actively established Chinese-Malay Muslim community in northern coastal Java, thus creating a permanent opposition to the Hindus of Java. By 1430, the expeditions had established Muslim Chinese, Arab and Malay communities in northern ports of Java such as Semarang, Demak, Tuban, and Ampel; thus, Islam began to gain a foothold in the northern coast of Java. Malacca prospered under Chinese Ming protection, while the Majapahit were steadily pushed back. Dominant Muslim kingdoms during this time included Samudera Pasai in northern Sumatra, Malacca Sultanate in eastern Sumatra, Demak Sultanate in central Java, Gowa Sultanate in southern Sulawesi, and the sultanates of Ternate and Tidore in the Maluku Islands to the east.

Indonesia's historical inhabitants were animists, Hindus, and Buddhists. Through assimilation related to trade, royal conversion, and conquest, however, Islam had supplanted Hinduism and Buddhism as the dominant religion of Java and Sumatra by the end of the 16th century. During this process, "cultural influences from the Hindu-Buddhist era were mostly tolerated or incorporated into Islamic rituals." Islam did not obliterate the preexisting culture; rather, it incorporated and embedded the local customs and non-Islamic elements among rules and arts, and reframed them as the Islamic traditions.

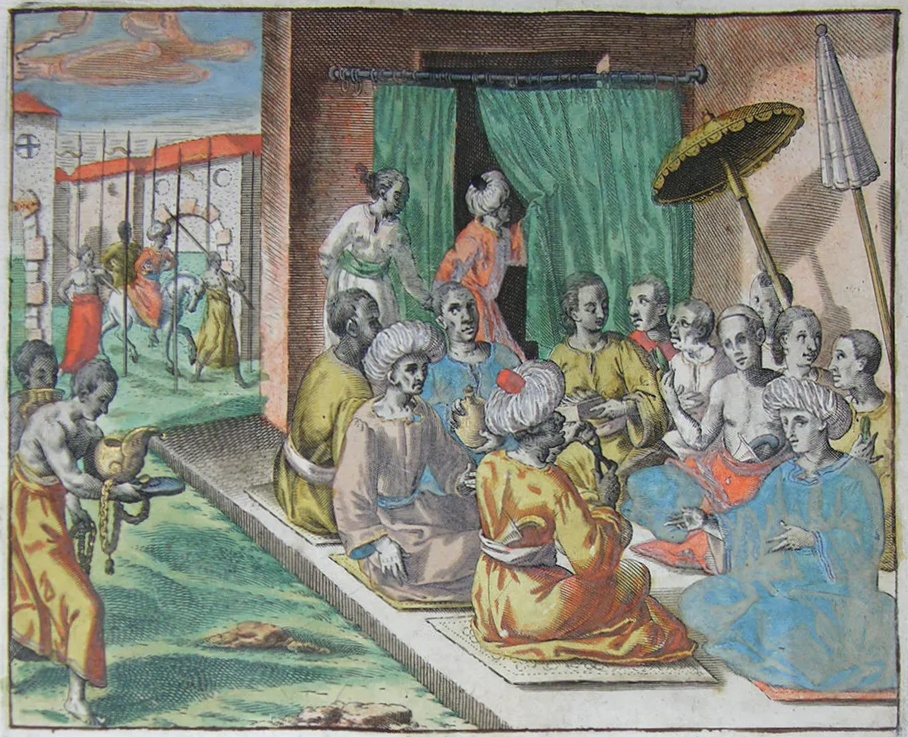
Wedding in the city of Bantam, 1599 by de Bry

In part, the strong presence of Sufism has been considered a major enabler of this syncretism between Islam and other religions. Sufism retained strong influence especially among the Islamic scholars arrived during the early days of the spread of Islam in Indonesia, and many Sufi orders such as Naqshbandiyah and Qadiriyya have attracted new Indonesian converts. They have proceeded to branch into different local divisions. Sufi mysticism which had proliferated during this course had shaped the syncretic, eclectic and pluralist nature of Islam in Indonesian during the time. Prolific Sufis from the Indonesian archipelago were already known in Arabic sources as far back as the 13th Century. One of the most important Indonesian Sufis from this time is Hamzah Fansuri, a poet and writer from the 16th century. The preeminence of Sufism among Islam in Indonesian continued until the shift of external influence from South Asia to the Arabian Peninsula, whose scholars brought more orthodox teachings and perceptions of Islam.

The gradual adoption of Islam by Indonesians was perceived as a threat by some ruling powers. As port towns adopted Islam, it undermined the waning power of the east Javanese Hindu/Buddhist Majapahit kingdom in the 16th century. Javanese rulers eventually fled to Bali, where over 2.5 million Indonesians practiced their version of Hinduism. Unlike coastal Sumatra, where Islam was adopted by elites and masses alike, partly as a way to counter the economic and political power of the Hindu-Buddhist kingdoms, the elites only gradually accepted Islam in the interior of Java, and then only as a formal legal and religious context for Javanese spiritual culture. The eastern islands remained largely animist until they adopted Islam and Christianity in the 17th and 18th centuries, whereas Bali still retains a Hindu majority. By the late 15th century, the Majapahit Empire in Java had begun to decline. This last Hindu kingdom in Java fell under the rising power of the Islamized Sultanate of Demak in the 1520s; in 1527, the Muslim ruler renamed newly conquered Sunda Kelapa as Jayakarta meaning "precious victory", which was eventually contracted to Jakarta. Islam in Java then began to spread formally, building on the spiritual influences of the revered Sufi saints Wali Songo (or Nine Saints).

Despite Islam being one of the most significant developments in Indonesian history, historical evidence remains fragmentary and uninformative. The understanding of how Islam arrived in Indonesia is limited; there is considerable debate among scholars about what conclusions can be drawn about the conversion of Indonesian peoples. The primary evidence, at least of the earlier stages of the process, are gravestones and a few travelers' accounts, but these can only show that indigenous Muslims were in a certain place at a certain time. This evidence is insufficient to comprehensively explain more complicated matters, such as how lifestyles were affected by the new religion or how deeply it affected societies.

=== Early modern period (1700–1945) ===
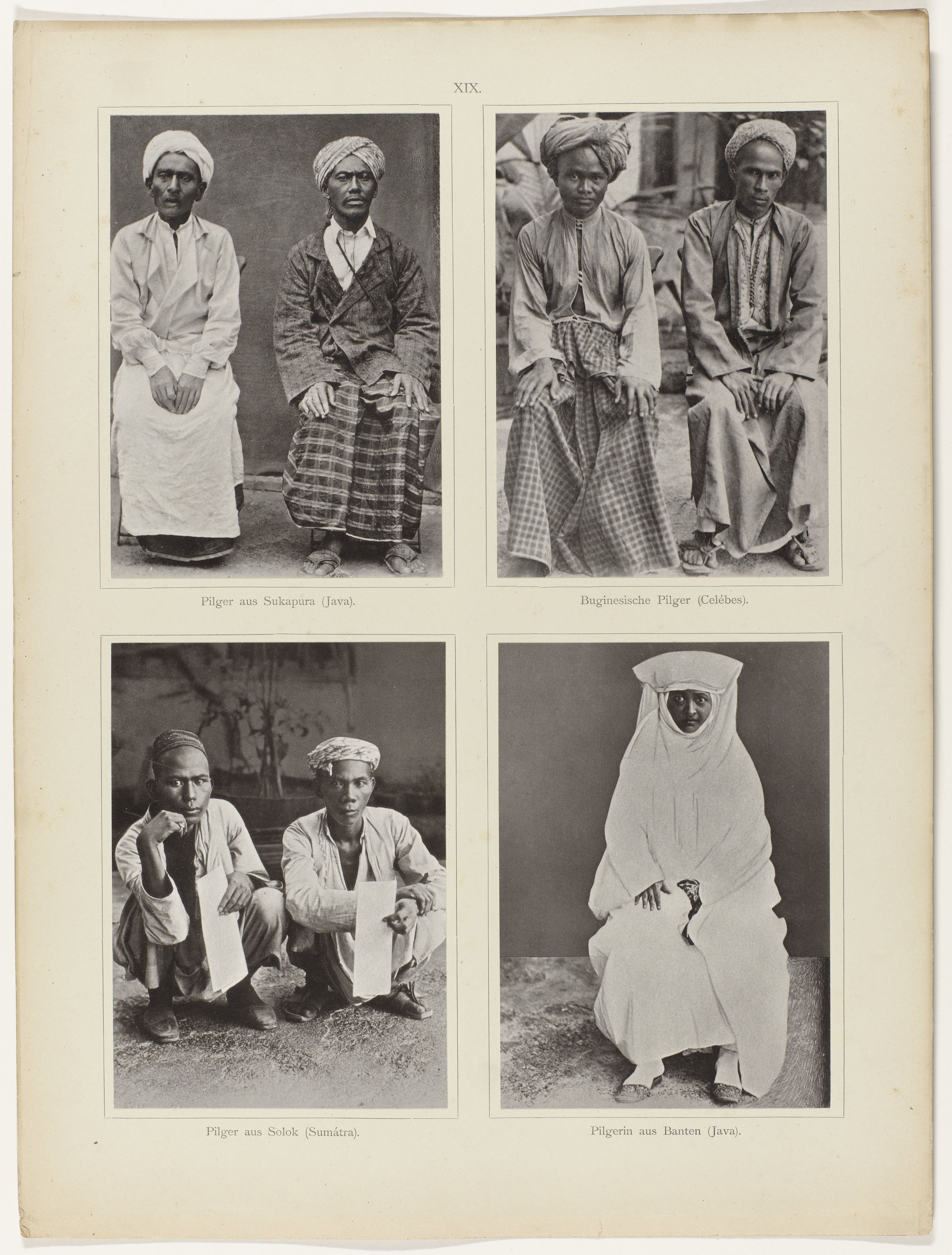
Hajj pilgrims from the Dutch East Indies.

The Dutch entered the region in the 17th century, attracted by its wealth established through the region's natural resources and trade. (Note: The Maluku Islands in the Indonesian archipelago were known as the "spice islands". The country's natural spices, including nutmeg, pepper, clove, were highly prized. Other popular trade items of the area include sandalwood, rubber and teak.) The entering of the Dutch resulted in a monopoly of the central trading ports. However, this helped the spread of Islam, as local Muslim traders relocated to the smaller and remoter ports, establishing Islam into the rural provinces. Towards the beginning of the 20th century, "Islam became a rallying banner to resist colonialism".

During this time the introduction of steam-powered transportation and printing technology was facilitated by European expansion. As a result, the interaction between Indonesia and the rest of the Islamic world, particularly the Middle East, had significantly increased. In Mecca, the number of pilgrims grew exponentially to the point that Indonesians were markedly referred as "rice of the Hejaz". The exchange of scholars and students was also increased. Around two hundred Southeast Asian students, mostly Indonesian, were studying in Cairo during the mid-1920s, and around two thousand citizens of Saudi Arabia were of Indonesian descent. Those who returned from the Middle East had become the backbone of religious training in pesantrens.

Concurrently, a number of newly founded religious thoughts and movements in the Islamic world had inspired the Islamic current in Indonesia. In particular, Islamic Modernism, which was inspired by Islamic scholar Muhammad 'Abduh, aimed to return to the original scripture of the religion. The Modernist movement in Indonesia had criticized the syncretic nature of Islam in Indonesia. It advocated for the reform of Islam and the elimination of perceived un-Islamic elements within the traditions. The movement also aspired to incorporate elements of modernity into Islam and, for instance, built schools that combined an Islamic and secular curricula, and was unique in that it trained women as preachers for women. Through the activities of the reformers and the reactions of their opponents, Indonesian society became more firmly structured along communal (aliran) rather than class lines.

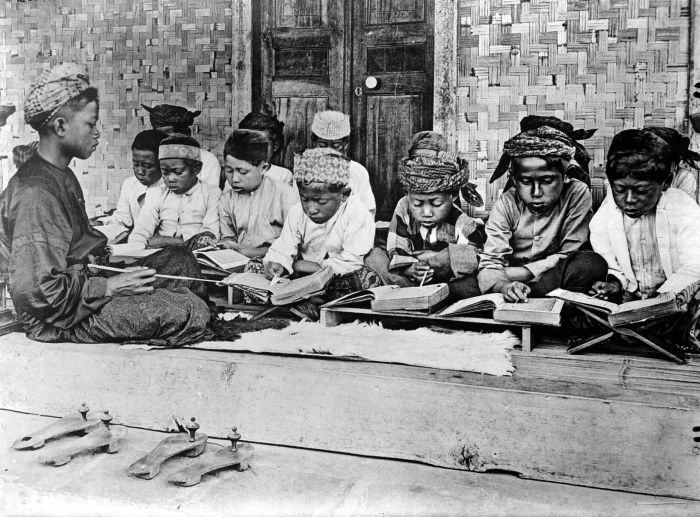
Children studying the Quran in Java during Dutch colonial periods.

Reformist movements had especially taken roots in the Minangkabau area of West Sumatra, where its ulema played an important role in the early reform movement. Renowned Minangkabau imam in Mecca Ahmad Khatib al-Minangkabawi had contributed greatly to the reformist training. He was single-handedly responsible for educating many of the essential Muslim figures during this time. In 1906, Tahir bin Jalaluddin, a disciple of al-Minangkabawi, published in al-Iman, the Malay newspaper in Singapore. Five years later followed publication of Al-Munir magazine by Abdullah Ahmad in Padang. In the first 20th century, Muslim modernist school arose in West Sumatra, such as Adabiah (1909), Diniyah Putri (1911), and Sumatera Thawalib (1915). The movement had also attained its supporter base in Java. In Surakarta, leftist Muslim Haji Misbach published in the monthly paper Medan Moeslimin and the periodical Islam Bergerak. In Jogjakarta, Ahmad Dahlan, also a disciple of al-Minangkabawi, established Muhammadiyah in 1911, spearheading the creation of Islamic mass organization. Muhammadiyah rapidly expanded its influence across the archipelago, with Abdul Karim Amrullah establishing the West Sumatra chapter in 1925 for instance. Other modernist organizations include Al-Irshad Al-Islamiya (1914) and PERSIS (1923). Soon after, traditionalist Nahdlatul Ulama (NU) was founded in 1926 by Hasyim Asy'ari, another disciple of al-Minangkabawi, in response to the perceived growing threat of reformist waves. Other traditionalist organizations included the Islamic Education Association (Perti) (1930) and Lombok-based Nahdlatul Wathan (1953).

A combination of reformist thoughts and the growing sense of sovereignty had led to the brief development of Islam as a vehicle for the political struggle against the Dutch colonialism. The earliest example is Padri movement from Minangkabau. Padri movement was inspired by Wahhabism during its inception, and aimed at the purification of Islam in Indonesia reciprocally. The movement eventually turned into a struggle against Dutch colonialism during the Padri War (1803–1837), although at the same time the Padri movement also fought the Adat tribes who were a semi secular Minangkabau nobility and traditional chiefs. One of the leaders, Tuanku Imam Bonjol, was declared a National Hero of Indonesia. Sarekat Islam championed Islam as a common identity among vast and diverse ethnic and cultural compositions throughout the archipelago, especially against the perceived enemy of the Christian masters. Educational institutions such as Jamiat Kheir also supported the development. In the process, Islam gave the sense of identity which contributed to the cultivation of Indonesian nationalism. Under this circumstance, early Indonesian nationalists were eager to reflect themselves as a part of the ummah (worldwide Islamic community). They also had interests in Islamic issues, such as re-establishment of Caliphate and the movements such as pan-Islamism. For these reasons, Dutch colonial administration saw Islam as a potential threat and treated the returning pilgrims and students from the Middle East with particular suspicion. A similar Islamic-nationalist organization Union of Indonesian Muslims (PERMI) faced severe crackdown by the Dutch colonial government, leading to the arrest of its members including Rasuna Said.

However, Islam as a vehicle of Indonesian nationalism had gradually waned in the face of the emergence of secular nationalism and more radical political thoughts such as communism. The inner struggle among Sarekat Islam between the reformists and the traditionalists had also contributed to its decline. This created a vacuum within the Muslim community for the leadership role, filled by civil society organizations such as Muhammadiyah, NU, more puritanical PERSIS, and Al-Irshad Al-Islamiya. These organizations upheld non-political position and concentrated on the social reforms and proselytization. This trend persisted during the Japanese occupation as well, whose occupational administration took the ambivalent stance toward Islam. Islam was considered both as a potential friend against the Western imperialism and a potential foe against their vision of Greater East Asia Co-Prosperity Sphere.

=== Post-independence (since 1945) ===
Eid al-Fitr mass prayer in Istiqlal Mosque, Jakarta, the largest mosque in Southeast Asia, completed in 1978.

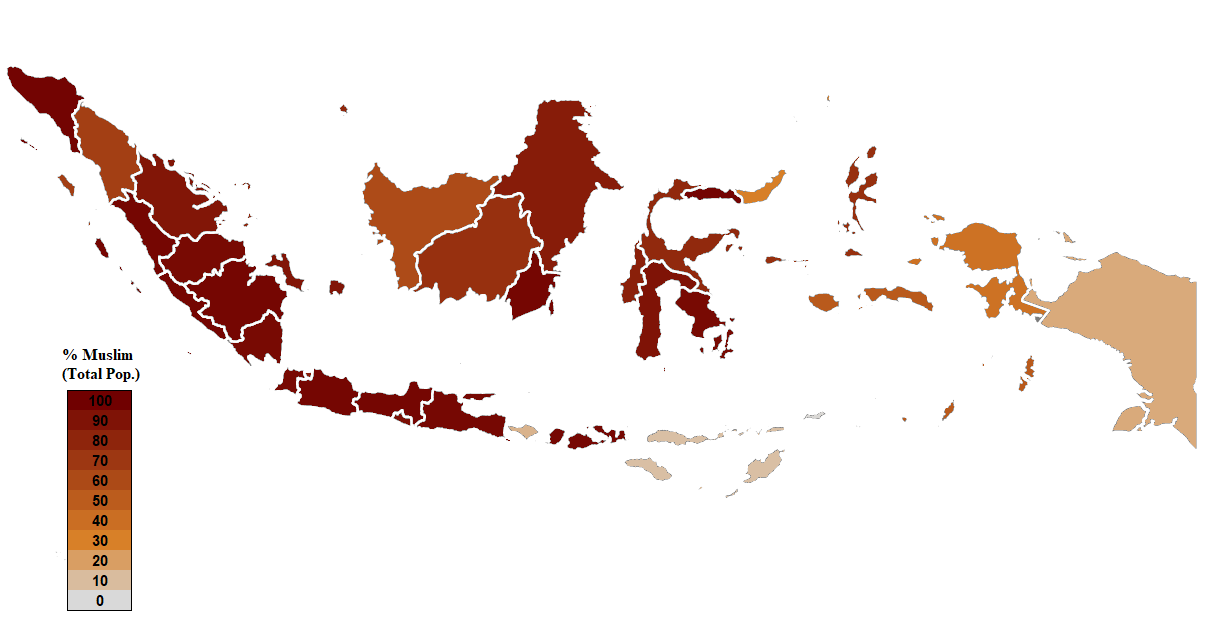
Distribution of Muslims in Indonesia (2010)

Indonesia became the world's second-largest Muslim-majority country after its independence in 1945. The separation of Bangladesh from Pakistan in 1971 made it the world's most populous Muslim-majority country. Post-independence had seen the most significant upheaval of the Muslim society on various aspects of society. This owes to the independence, increased literacy and educational attainment among Muslims, funding from the Middle East, and all the more accelerated exchange between other Muslim countries.

The subsequent development of the Muslim society had brought Indonesia even closer to the center of Islamic intellectual activity. A number of scholars and writers have contributed to the development of Islamic interpretations within the Indonesian context, often through the intellectual exchange between the foreign contemporaries. Abdul Malik Karim Amrullah (Hamka) was a modernist writer and religious leader who is credited for Tafsir al-Azhar. It was the first comprehensive Qur'anic exegesis (tafsir) written in the Indonesian, which attempted to construe Islamic principles within the Malay-Minangkabau culture. Harun Nasution was a pioneering scholar adhered to the humanist and rationalist perspectives in Indonesian intellectual landscape, advocating for a position described as neo-Mutazilite. Nurcholish Madjid (Cak Nur) was a highly influential scholar who is credited for cultivating the modernist and reformist discourse, primarily influenced by Pakistani Islamic philosopher Fazlur Rahman. Abdurrahman Wahid (Gus Dur), later president of Indonesia, went through the Islamic education at the University of Baghdad, and later became the central figure of Indonesia's liberal Islamic trend. Quraish Shihab compiled Tafsir Al-Mishbah, which is considered a standard of Indonesian Islamic interpretation among mainstream Indonesian Islamic intellectuals.

Post-independence had also seen an expansion in the activity of Islamic organizations, especially regarding missionary activities (dawah) and Islamization of lifestyles. The Ministry of Religion reported that as late as the 1960s, only a minority of Muslims were practicing daily prayers and almsgiving. This status had drastically changed through the course of endeavor by the organizations such as the Indonesian Islamic Dawah Council (DDII) led by Mohammad Natsir, not to mention aforementioned Muhammadiyah, NU, and PERSIS. Among Islamic clergy, Indonesian Ulema Council (MUI) has been operating as an authority regarding the legislative and juridical issues of Islam, and responsible for guiding the general direction of Islamic life in Indonesia, primarily through the issuance of fatwa. More recently, organizations such as DDII and LIPIA have been acting as instruments of the propagation of Salafism or Wahhabism with funding from Saudi Arabia and other Gulf monarchies, that "has contributed to a more conservative, more intolerant atmosphere" and eager to strip heritages of traditional Indonesian Islam of local customs influenced by Animism ritual and Sufi teaching. On the political arena, the coalition of Muhammadiyah and NU have established the Masyumi Party, which served as a mainstream Islamic political party until its dissolution in 1960. Meanwhile, militant Islamic organizations such as Darul Islam, Laskar Jihad, and Jemaah Islamiyah had also seen its growth, aided mostly by foreign funding as well.

Upon independence, there was significant controversy surrounding Islam's role in politics, which had caused enormous tensions. The contentions were mainly surrounding the position of Islam in the constitution of Indonesia. Islamic groups have aspired for the supreme status of Islam within the constitutional framework by the inclusion of the Jakarta Charter, which obliges Muslim to abide by shari'a. The Sukarno regime denied this with the implementation of the more pluralist constitution heeding to the ideology of Pancasila, which was deemed non-Islamic. Eventually, Indonesia adopted a civil code instead of an Islamic one. However, the struggle for the constitutional amendment continued. The hostility against the Sukarno regime was manifested on various other occasions. Most notably the anti-communist genocide perpetuated actively by Ansor Youth Movement, the youth wing of NU (which was initially supportive of the Sukarno regime) and other Islamic groups. Muslims adhering to the syncretic form of Islam known as Abangan had also become the target of this mass killing. Communism was considered hostile by Muslims due to perceived atheistic nature and the tendency of landowners being local Islamic chiefs.

During the New Order, there was an intensification of religious belief among Muslims. Initially hoped as the ally of Islamic groups, the New Order quickly became the antagonist following its attempt to reform educational and marital legislation to more secular-oriented code. This met strong opposition, with marriage law left as Islamic code as a result. Suharto had also attempted at consolidating Pancasila as the only state ideology, which was also turned down by the fierce resistance of Islamic groups. Under the Suharto regime, containment of Islam as a political ideology had led to all the Islamic parties forcibly unite under one government-supervised Islamic party, the United Development Party (PPP). Certain Islamic organizations were incorporated by the Suharto regime, most notably MUI, DDII, and Indonesian Association of Muslim Intellectuals (ICMI) to absorb the political Islam for the regime's gain. With Suharto's resignation in 1998, "the structure that repressed religion and society collapsed."

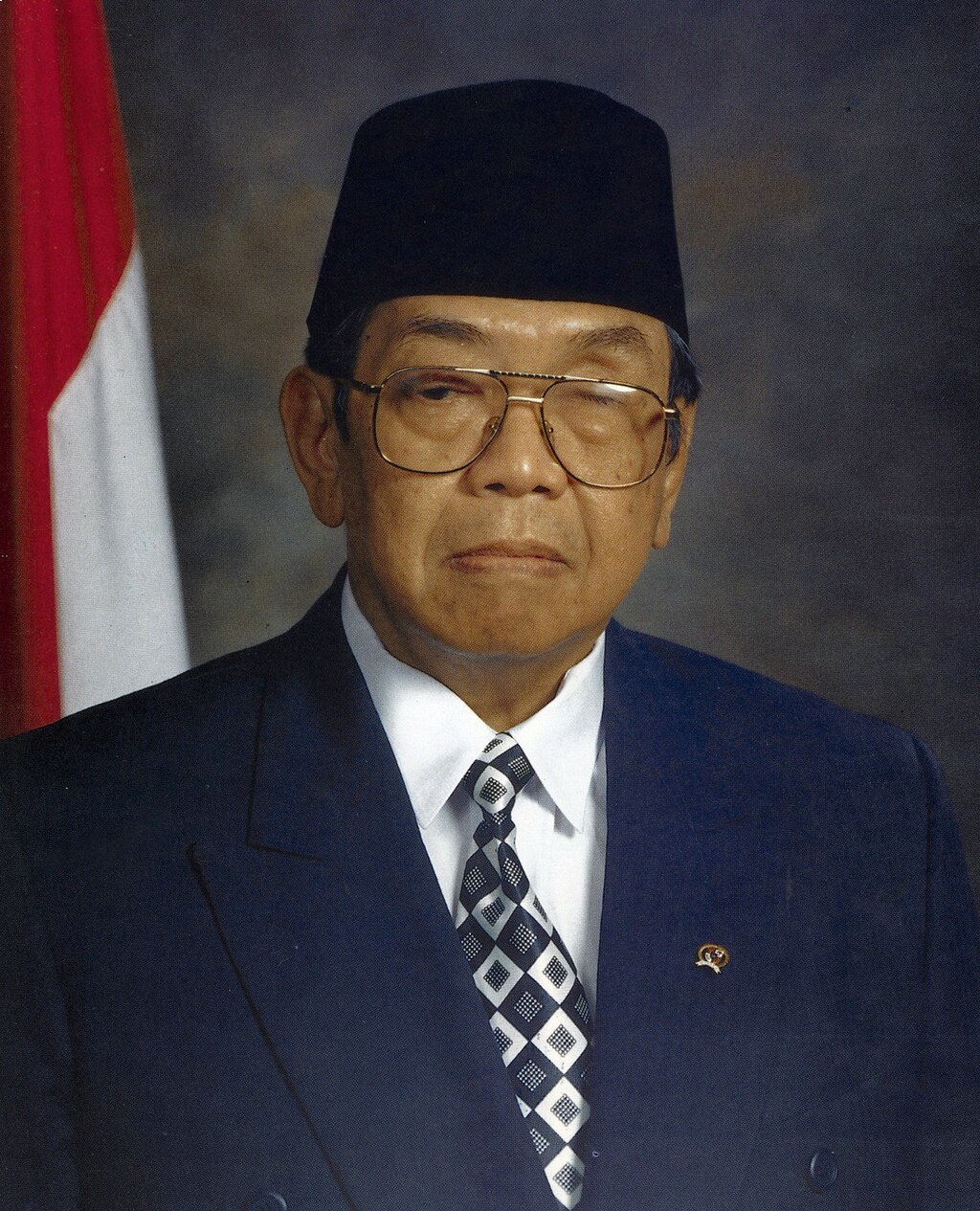
Abdurrahman Wahid, colloquially known as Gus Dur, was a leader of Nahdlatul Ulama and the fourth president of Indonesia.

During the beginning of the Reformasi era, the ascendance of Islamic political parties had led to the election of Abdurrahman Wahid, the leader of NU, as the fourth president of Indonesia, and the appointment of Amien Rais, the leader of Muhammadiyah, as the chairman of the People's Consultative Assembly. This era was briefly marked by the collapse of social order, erosion of central administrative control, and law enforcement breakdown. They resulted in violent conflicts in which Islamic groups were involved, including separatism of Aceh where the more conservative form of Islam is favored, and sectarian clashes between Muslims and Christians in Maluku and Poso. With the collapse of the establishment, MUI began distancing themselves from the government and attempted to exercise wider influence toward Indonesia's Islamic civil society. This led to the issuance of controversial 2005 fatwa condemning the notion of liberalism, secularism and pluralism, and subsequent criticism by progressive intellectuals. However, the political transition from authoritarianism to democracy went relatively smoothly due considerably to the commitment of tolerance by mass organizations such as NU and Muhammadiyah. This made Muslim civil society a key part of Indonesia's democratic transition.

Currently, Muslims are considered fully represented in the democratically elected parliament. There are numbers of active Islamic political parties, namely Muhammadiyah-oriented National Mandate Party (PAN), NU-oriented National Awakening Party (PKB), and Islamist Prosperous Justice Party (PKS). The democratization had resulted in diversification of religious influence as well, with the relative decline in the influence of established institutions such as NU and Muhammadiyah, and the rise of smaller-scale organizations and individual preachers such as Abdullah Gymnastiar (Aa Gym) and Yusuf Mansur. During the early 2000s, the return of Abu Bakar Bashir, who was in exile during the Suharto era as a spiritual leader of Jihadism in Indonesia, resulted in the series of bombing attacks, (Note: See 2002 Bali bombings, 2003 Marriott Hotel bombing) which have been largely contained recently. Contemporary Islam in Indonesia is analyzed in various ways, with certain analysis consider it as becoming more conservative. (Note: "Conservatism" in this sense connotes the adherence toward the perceived orthodoxy of Islamic principles, rather than the commitment to the Indonesian cultural and societal traditions. Therefore under this framing, it may entail conservatism's proponents advocating for the societal changes, while the proponents of liberalism opposing against them.) At the same time, others deem it as "too big to fail" for the radicalization. Conservative development has seen the emergence of vigilante group Islamic Defenders Front (FPI), persecution against Ahmadiyya exemplified by MUI's fatwa, and the nationwide protest in 2016 against the incumbent governor of Jakarta Basuki Tjahaja Purnama (Ahok) accused of blasphemy. Liberal development has seen the emergence of groups such as Liberal Islamic Network (JIL), formation of Islam Nusantara as a collective identity of pluralist Islam, and claimed as the declining support for the Islamist political parties.

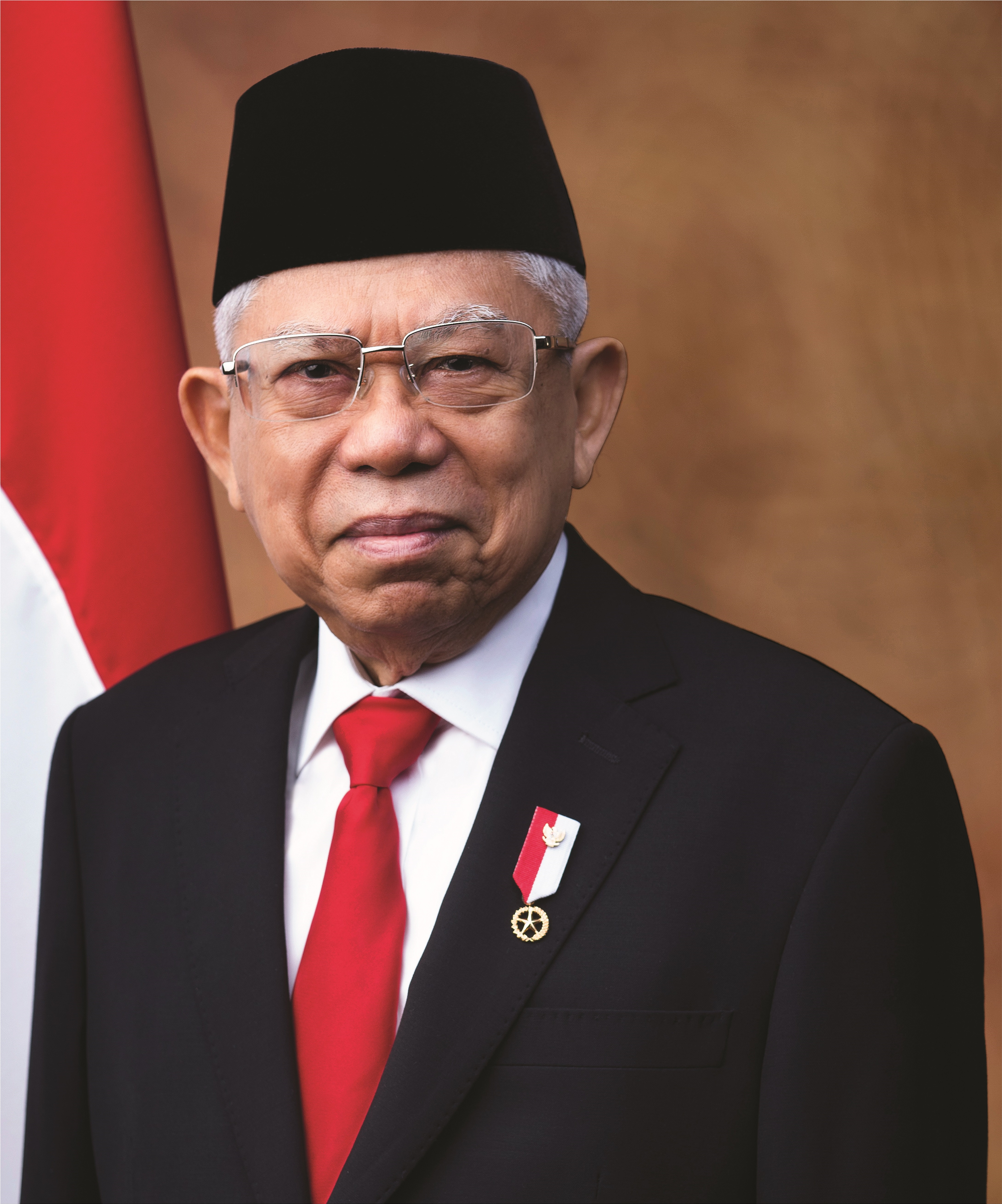
Ma'ruf Amin Islamic cleric was a MUI chairman and 13th Vice President of Indonesia.

The seventh President Joko Widodo (Jokowi), who served from 2014 to 2024, advocates a strict separation of religion and politics. His position is supported by major Muslim organizations such as the NU. However, it is interpreted and condemned by some members of the MUI as a form of secularism. At the same time, former PKS chairman Sohibul Iman criticized Jokowi's position as having the potential of increasing tension in Indonesian society. In 2017, a "Government Regulation in Lieu of Law" (Peraturan Pemerintah Pengganti Undang-Undang or Perppu) regulating mass organizations was passed by the People's Representative Council and ratified by the president, which led to the ban of the Indonesian branch of Hizbut Tahrir for rejecting and undermining the state ideology Pancasila. FPI was dissolved in 2020, with its members being involved in criminal cases and allegedly linked to terrorist groups. Since 2019, MUI chairman and former NU leader Ma'ruf Amin has been the Vice President of Indonesia.

== Culture ==
=== Arts ===
Several artistic traditions in Indonesia, many of which existed since the pre-Islamic era, have absorbed Islamic influence and evolved in artistic expression and attachment of religious implications. Some of which are particularly evident in Islamic calligraphy, which became a central element in Indonesian art.

==== Batik ====
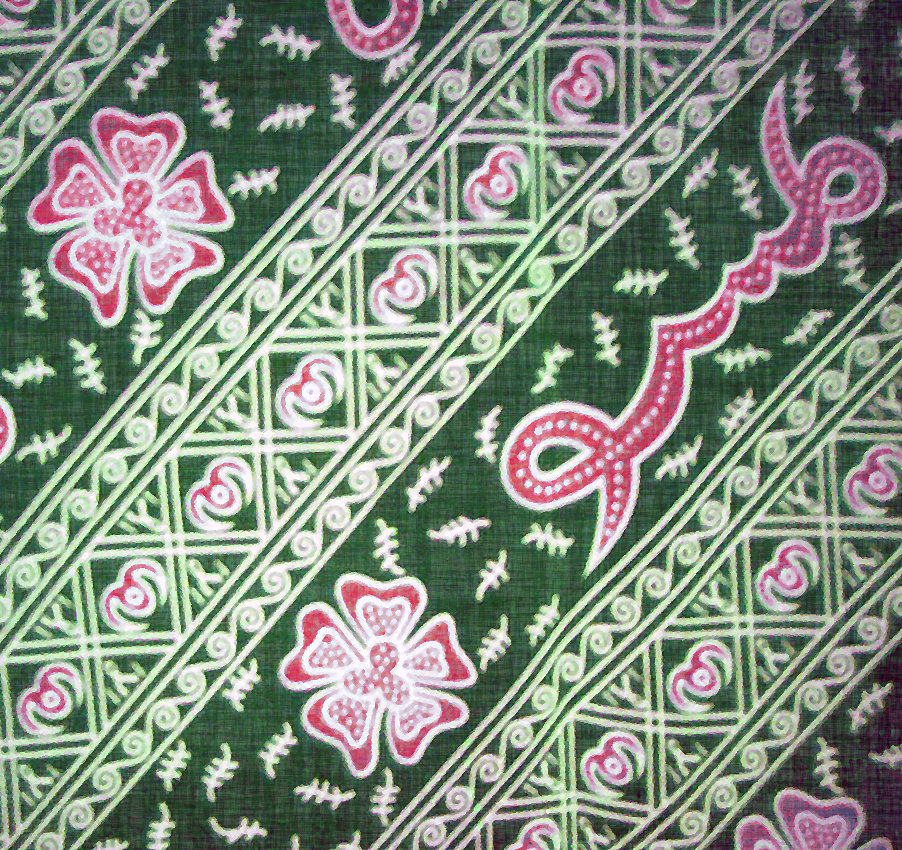
Batik besurek from Bengkulu, Sumatra which draws inspiration from Arabic calligraphy

The Indonesian dyeing art known as Batik has incorporated Islamic influence through the inclusion of motifs and designs revering the Islamic artistic traditions, such as Islamic calligraphy and Islamic interlace patterns, and the religious codes prescribing the avoidance of the depictions of human images. Islamic influence of batik is especially pronounced in the batik tradition situated around the Javanese region of Cirebon, which forms the part of coastal Javanese batik heritage, the Central Sumatran region of Jambi which had thriving trade relations with Javanese coastal cities, and the South Sumatran region of Bengkulu where the strong sense of Islamic identity was cultivated. Jambi batik influenced the formation of Malaysian batik tradition which also encompasses the Islamic characters such as adopting the plants, floral motifs and geometrical designs, and the avoidance of interpretation of human and animal images as idolatry. Minangkabau batik tradition is known for batiak tanah liek (clay batik), which uses clay as a dye for the fabric, and embraces the animal and floral motifs. Bengkulu batik tradition is known for batik besurek, which literary means "batik with letters" as they draw inspiration from Arabic calligraphy. Islamic batik tradition occasionally depicts Buraq as well, an Islamic mythical creature from the heavens which transported the Islamic prophet Muhammad from Mecca to Jerusalem and back during the Isra and Mi'raj.

==== Wayang ====
The Indonesian performing art of Wayang has a variety known as Wayang sadat which has deployed Wayang for Islam's religious teachings. There is also Wayang Menak which is derived from Javanese-Islamic literature Serat Menak which is a Javanese rendering of Malay Hikayat Amir Hamzah, which ultimately derived from Persian Hamzanama, tells the adventure of Amir Hamzah, the uncle of the Islamic prophet Muhammad. In Lombok, vernacular Wayang Kulit is known as Wayang Sasak, which incorporates puppets similar to the Javanese Wayang Menak and based on the adventures of Amir Hamzah as well.

When Islam began spreading in Indonesia, the display of God or gods in human form was prohibited. Thus this style of painting and shadow play was suppressed. King Raden Patah of Demak, Java, wanted to see the wayang in its traditional form but failed to obtain permission from Muslim religious leaders. Religious leaders attempted to skirt the Muslim prohibition by converting the wayang golek into wayang purwa made from leather and displayed only the shadow instead of the puppets themselves.

==== Dance ====
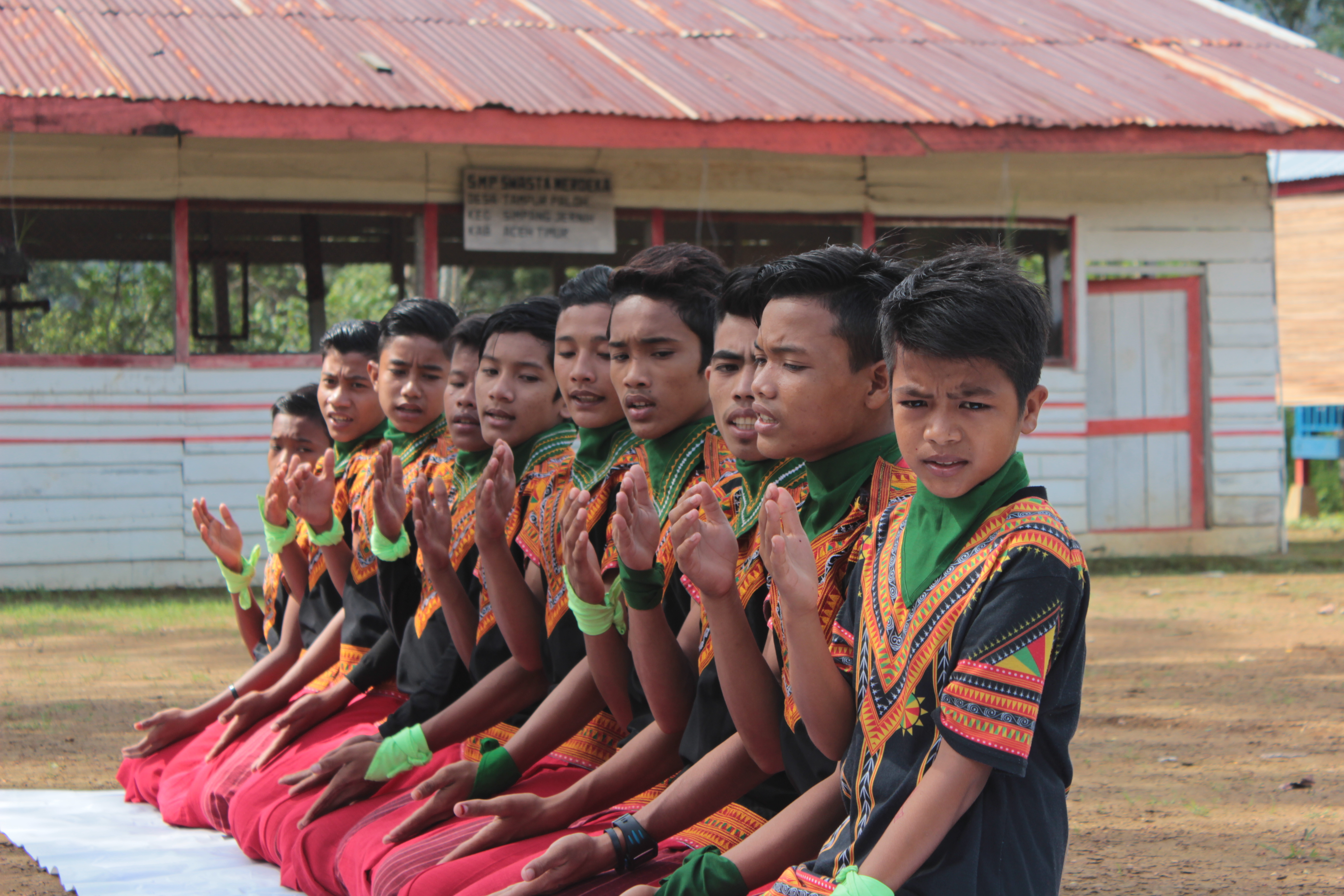
Saman dance, originated in Gayo Highlands, adopted Arab and Persian dance and musical styles. It was historically performed during the Islamic prophet Muhammad's birthday.

The history of dance in Indonesia can be roughly divided into the Hindu-Buddhist period and Islamic period. During the Islamic period, the vernacular and dharmic dances continued to be popular and tolerated. Artists and performers were using the Hindu-Buddhist era styles but incorporated stories with Islamic implications and more modest clothing that conformed to the Islamic teaching. This change is markedly seen in Tari Persembahan from Jambi, in which the dancers are still adorned with the intricate gold of the Hindu/Buddhist era but the clothing is more modest. Newer styles of dance were introduced in the Islamic period, including Zapin dances of the Malay people and Gayonese Saman dance in Aceh, which adopted dance styles and music typical of Arab and Persia, and combined them with indigenous styles to form a newer generation of dance in the era of Islam. Saman dance was initially performed during the Islamic missionary activity (dawah) or during the certain customary events such as the commemoration of the Islamic prophet Muhammad's birthday. Today more commonly performed during any official events. The adoption of Persian and Arab musical instruments, such as rebana, tambur, and gendang drums that has become the main instrument in Islamic dances, as well as the chant that often quotes Islamic chants.

=== Architecture ===
Indonesian Islamic Architecture

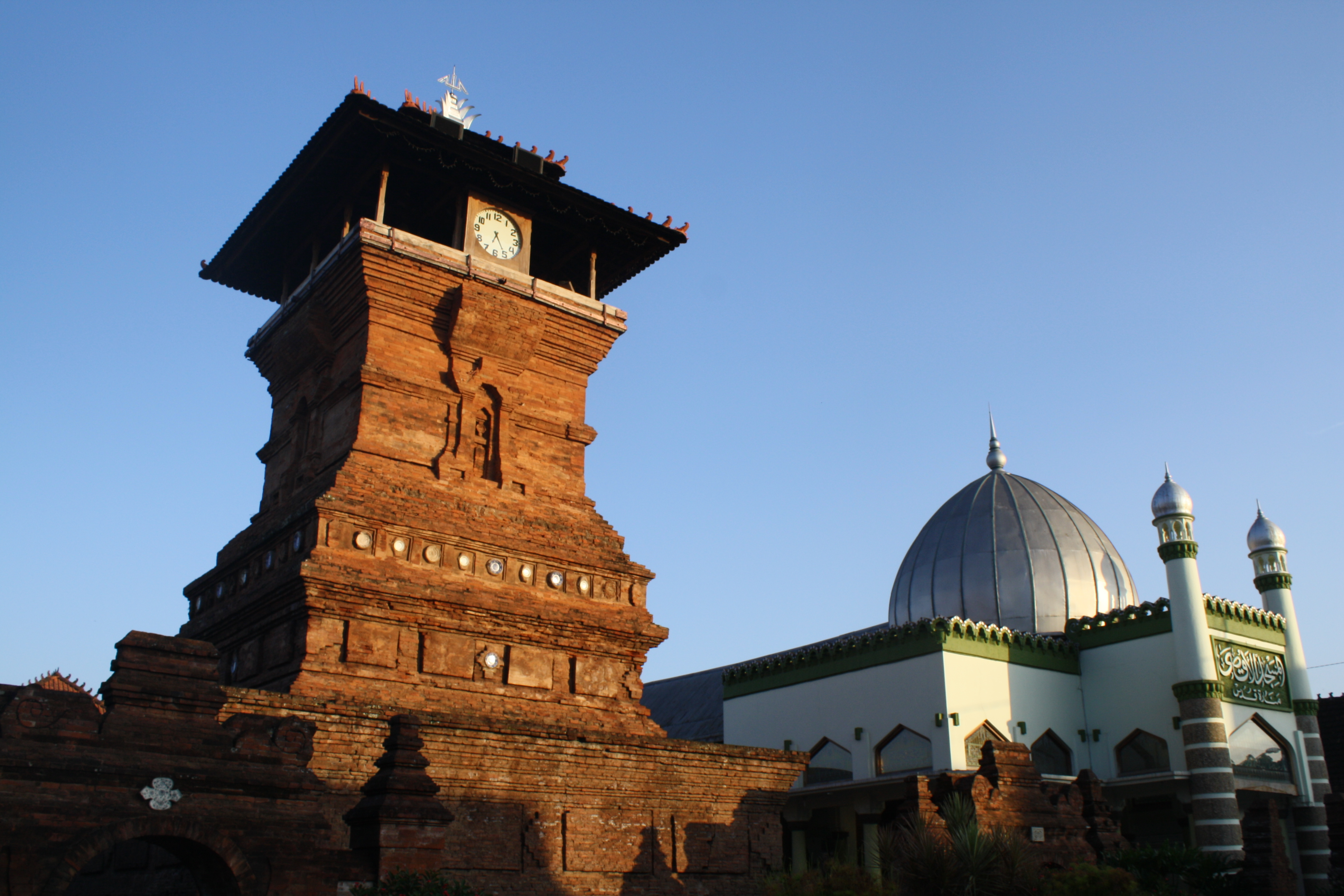
Menara Kudus Mosque, vernacular Javanese and Balinese style

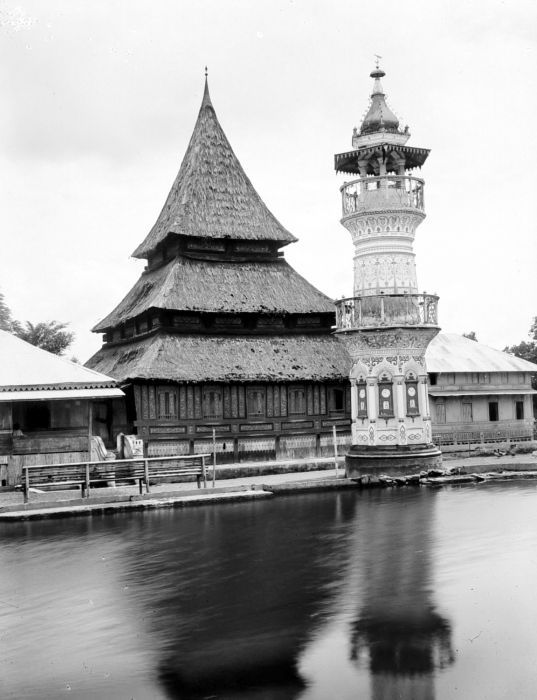
Jami Mosque of Taluak, vernacular Minangkabau style main building with later addition Indo-Persian style minaret

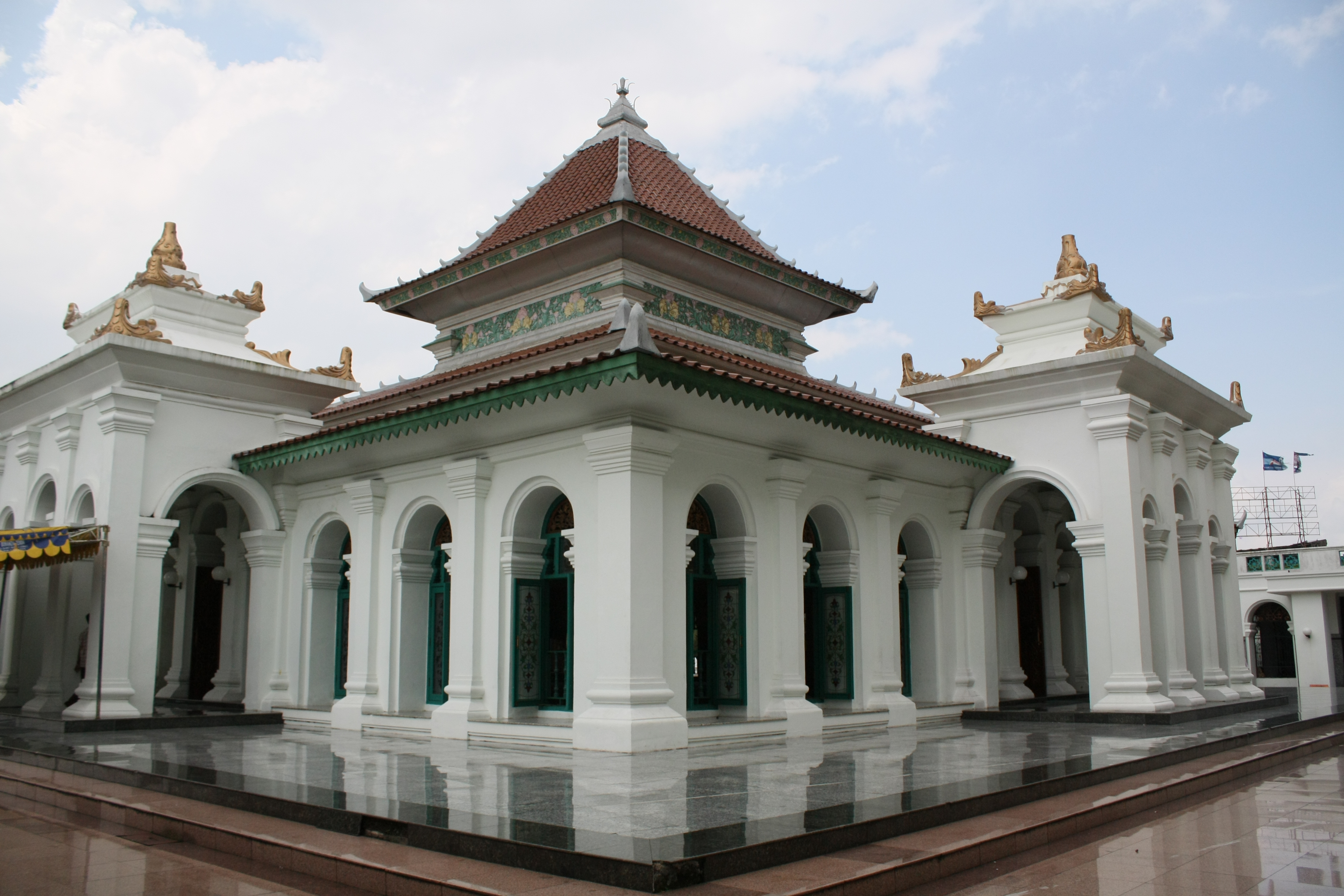
Great Mosque of Palembang, fusion of Chinese, Malay and European styles

The architecture of Indonesia after the spread of Islam was prominently characterized by the religious structure with the combination of Islamic implications and Indonesian architectural traditions. Initial forms of the mosque, for example, were predominantly built in the vernacular Indonesian architectural style which employs Hindu, Buddhist or Chinese architectural elements, and notably didn't equip orthodox form of Islamic architectural elements such as dome and minaret. Vernacular style mosques in Java is distinguished by its tall timber multi-level roofs known as tajug, similar to the pagodas of Balinese Hindu temples and derived from Indian and Chinese architectural styles. Another characteristic of Javanese style mosque is the usage of gamelan drum instrument bedug as a substitute of prayer call (adhan). Bedug is often installed in the roofed front porch attached to the building known as serambi. Bedug is commonly used for prayer call or the signal during Ramadan throughout the Javanese mosques up until today. Prominent examples of mosques with vernacular Javanese designs are Demak Mosque in Demak, built in 1474, and the Menara Kudus Mosque in Kudus, built in 1549, whose minaret is thought to be the watchtower of an earlier Hindu temple. Vernacular style mosques in Minangkabau area is distinguished by its multi-layer roof made of fiber resembling Rumah Gadang, the Minangkabau residential building. Prominent examples of mosques with vernacular Minangkabau designs are Bingkudu Mosque, founded in 1823 by the Padris, and Jami Mosque of Taluak, built in 1860. In West Sumatra, there is also a tradition of multi-purpose religious architecture known as surau which is often built in vernacular Minangkabau style as well, with three- or five-tiered roofs and woodcarvings engraved in the facade. Vernacular style mosques in Kalimantan is influenced by the Javanese counterparts, exemplified by the Banjar architecture which employs three- or five-tiered roof with the steep top roof, compared to the relatively low-angled roof of Javanese mosque. The employment of stilts in some mosques, a separate roof on the mihrab. Prominent examples including Heritage Mosque of Banua Lawas and Jami Mosque of Datu Abulung, both in South Kalimantan.

Only after the 19th century, the mosques began incorporating more orthodox styles imported during the Dutch colonial era. Architectural style during this era is characterized by Indo-Islamic or Moorish Revival architectural elements, with onion-shaped dome and arched vault. Minaret was not introduced to full extent until the 19th century, and its introduction was accompanied by the importation of architectural styles of Persian and Ottoman origin with the prominent usage of calligraphy and geometric patterns. During this time, many of the older mosques built in traditional style were renovated, and small domes were added to their square hipped roofs. Simultaneously, eclectic architecture integrating European and Chinese styles was introduced as well. Prominent examples of Indonesian Islamic architecture with foreign styles including Baiturrahman Grand Mosque in Banda Aceh, completed in 1881, designed in Indo-Saracenic Revival architecture, and Great Mosque of Palembang in Palembang, initially completed in 1798, and later expanded with integrating Chinese, Malay and European architectural styles harmonized together.

=== Clothing ===
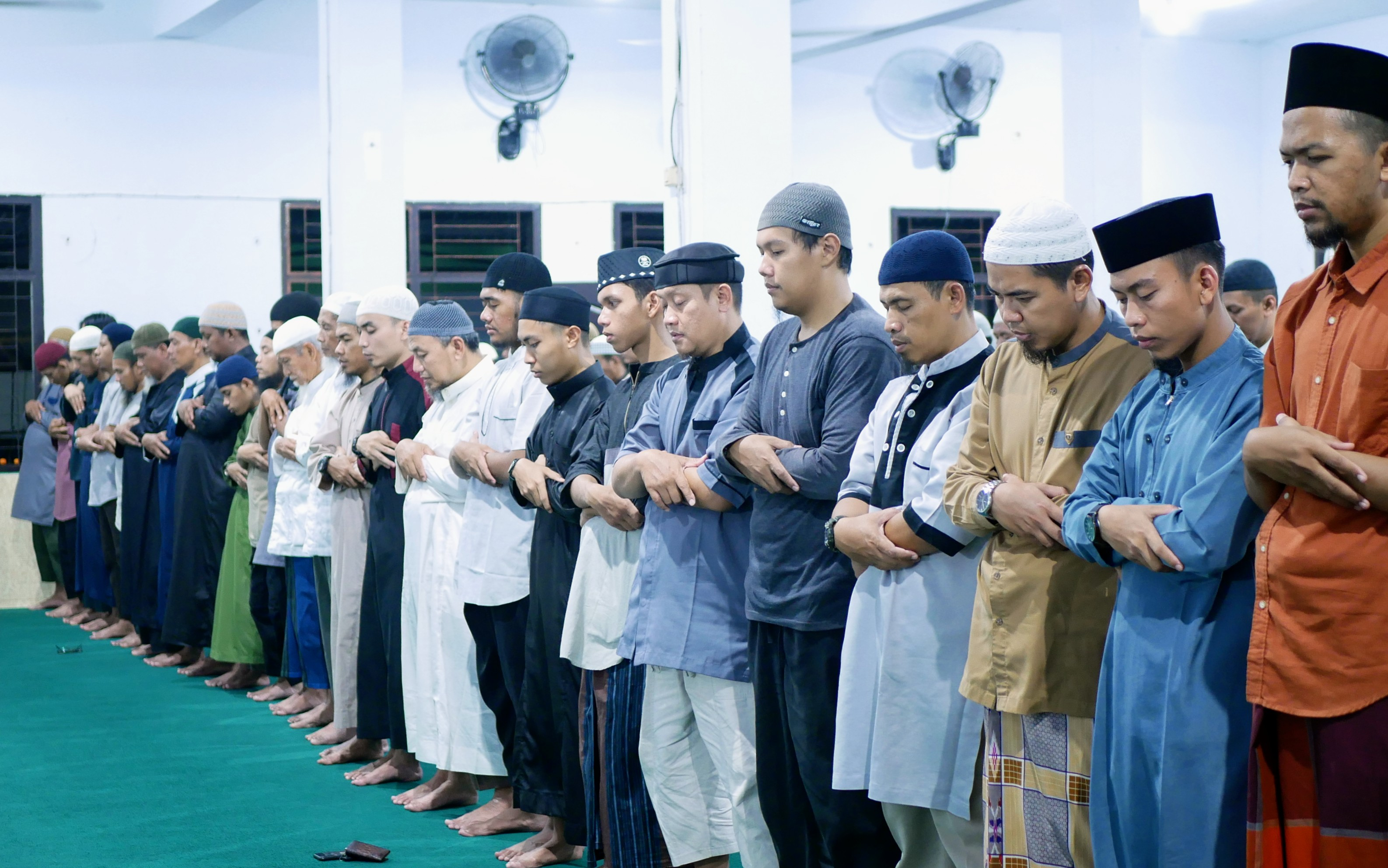
Indonesian Muslim men wearing peci and sarung standing in prayer.

The peci, songkok, or kopiah in Java, is a velvet cap with generally black color worn by Muslim men. It is originated within the Malay culture and can be traced back to the Ottoman fez. It is worn during the formal occasions, including Islamic religious occasions such as Idul Fitr and Idul Adha, as well as congregational prayers when visiting mosques.

The sarong is the popular garment worn mostly by Muslim men, notably in Java, Bali, Sumatra and Kalimantan. It is a large tube or length of fabric, often wrapped around the waist. The fabric often has woven plaid or checkered patterns, or brightly colored by means of batik or ikat dyeing. Many modern sarongs have printed designs, often depicting animals or plants. It is mostly worn as a casual wear but often worn during the congregational prayers as well. The baju koko, also known as baju takwa, is a traditional Malay-Indonesian Muslim shirt for men, worn usually during the formal religious occasions, such as Idul Fitr festival or Friday prayers. It is often worn with the sarong and peci.

The kerudung is an Indonesian Muslim women's hijab, which is a loosely worn cloth over the head. Unlike completely covered counterpart of jilbab, parts of hairs and neck are still visible. The jilbab is a more conservative Muslim women's hijab, adopted from Middle Eastern style, and usually worn by more conservative Muslim women. Unlike kerudung, hair and neck are completely covered. Jilbab in Indonesian context means headscarf. It does not designate the long overgarment as implied in the Muslim society in other countries.

=== Festival ===
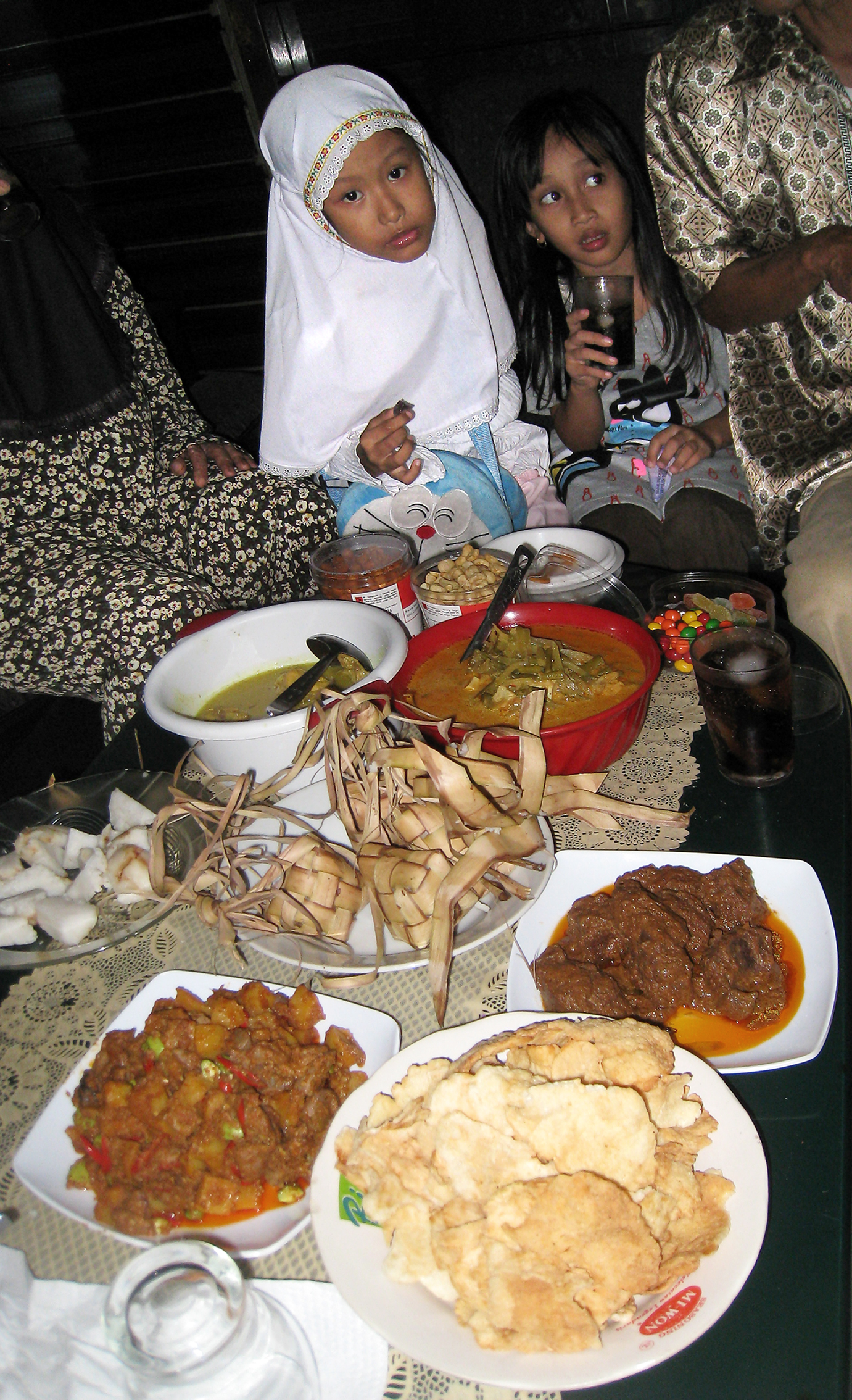
During Idul Fitri, families get together to enjoy a lebaran feast where ketupat and various special dishes are served.

Muslim holy days celebrated in Indonesia include the Isra and Mi'raj, Idul Fitr, Idul Adha, the Islamic New Year, and the Prophet's Birthday.

==== Hajj ====
The government has a monopoly on organising the hajj pilgrimage to Mecca. In February 2010, following the latest Hajj, the Department of Religious Affairs drew sharp criticism for mismanaging the registration of approximately 30,000 prospective pilgrims after they had paid the required fees. The government unilaterally expanded the country's quota of 205,000 pilgrims, claiming it had informal approval from the Saudi Government, an assertion that proved incorrect. Members of the House of Representatives have sponsored a bill to set up an independent institution, thus ending the department's monopoly.

==== Tabuik ====
Tabuik is a Shia Islamic occasion in the Minangkabau region, particularly in the city of Pariaman and it is a part of the Shia days of remembrance among the local community. Tabuik refers to the towering funeral biers carried during the commemoration. The event has been performed every year since the Day of Ashura in 1831, when the practice was introduced to the region by the Shia sepoy troops from India who were stationed—and later settled—there during the British Raj. The festival enacts the Battle of Karbala and plays the tassa and dhol drums.

== Society ==
=== Gender ===
To a significant degree, the way in which Islam manifests in Indonesia's lifestyle is unique and reflective of Southeast Asian culture. However, there have been several instances of discrimination for women in the work field, such as Hijabophobia, resulting in demonstrations.

==== Gender segregation ====
Many Muslims in Indonesia have a relaxed view on social relations between sexes. Strict sex segregation is usually limited to religious settings, such as in mosques during prayer. It is common for boys and girls to study together in their classroom in both public and Islamic schools. Nevertheless, there is a growing influence of a more traditional, orthodox view of sex segregation in public places. This is done to avoid contact between opposite sexes; for example, some women wearing hijab might refuse to shake hands or converse with men. However, the number of sexual harassment cases in Indonesia have increased, with the majority of victims being women who wear hijab.

== Politics ==
From a Pew Research Center (PEW) opinion poll in 2010, Indonesia is the only country, among the five countries surveyed with a Muslim majority population, whose citizens tend to identify more with their nationality than their religion. According Article 29 of Indonesia's Constitution however affirms that "the state is based on the belief in the one supreme God." (Note: The Indonesian Constitution provides "all persons the right to worship according to their own religion or belief" and states that "the nation is based upon belief in one supreme God." The Government generally respects these provisions; however, some restrictions exist on certain religious activity types and on unrecognised religions. The Ministry of Religious Affairs recognizes official status of six faiths: Islam, Catholicism, Protestantism, Buddhism, Hinduism, Confucianism. Religious organisations other than the six recognised faiths can register with the Government, but only with the Ministry for Culture and Tourism and only as social organisations. Atheism and agnosticism are not explicitly outlawed but socially stigmatised.) Over the past 50 years, many Islamic groups have opposed this secular and pluralist direction, and sporadically have sought to establish an Islamic state. However, the country's mainstream Muslim community, including influential social organisations such as Muhammadiyah and NU, reject the idea. Proponents of an Islamic state argued unsuccessfully in 1945 and throughout the parliamentary democracy period of the 1950s for the inclusion of language (the "Jakarta Charter") in the Constitution's preamble making it obligatory for Muslims to follow shari'a.

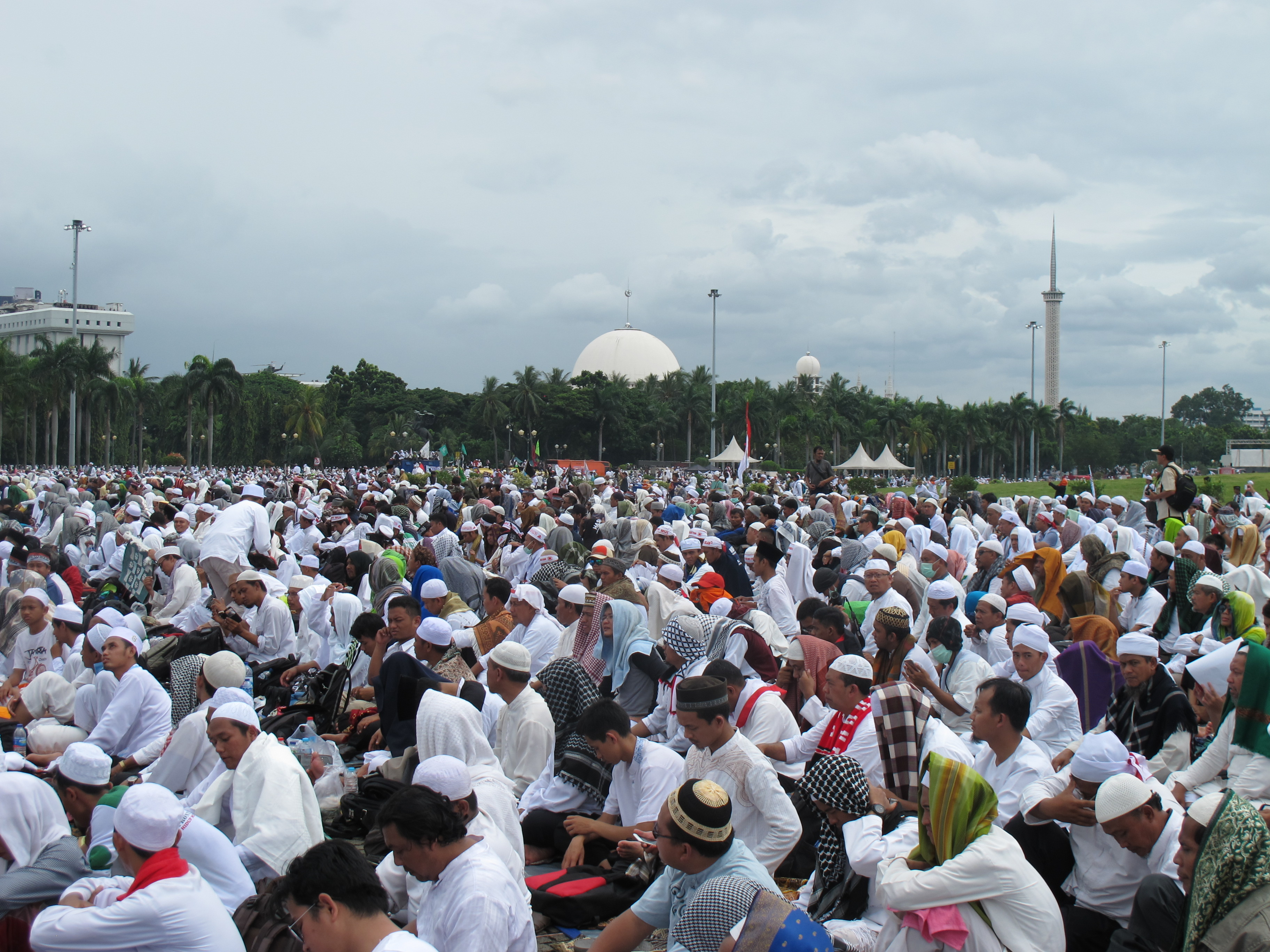
Protests against Basuki Tjahaja Purnama, Christian governor of Jakarta, 2 December 2016

An Islamist political movement aspired to form an Islamic state, established Darul Islam/Tentara Islam Indonesia (DI/TII) in 1949, which launched an armed rebellion against the Republic throughout the 1950s. The outbreak of the Islamic state in multiple provinces, started in West Java led by Kartosoewirjo, the rebellion also spread to Central Java, South Sulawesi and Aceh. The Islamist armed rebellion was successfully cracked down in 1962. The movement has alarmed the Sukarno administration to the potential threat of political Islam against the Indonesian Republic.

During the Suharto regime (1966–1998), the government prohibited all advocacy of an Islamic state. This timeframe also coincided with an increase in the number of Liberal Muslims in Indonesia from 1970 until 2005. However, with the loosening of restrictions on freedom of speech and religion that followed Suharto's fall in 1998, proponents of the "Jakarta Charter" resumed advocacy efforts. This proved the case before the 2002 Annual Session of the People's Consultative Assembly (MPR), a body that has the power to change the Constitution. The nationalist political parties, regional representatives elected by provincial legislatures, and appointed police, military, and functional representatives, who together held a majority of seats in the MPR, rejected proposals to amend the Constitution to include shari'a, and the measure never came to a formal vote. The MPR approved changes to the Constitution that mandated that the Government increase "faith and piety" in education. This decision, seen as a compromise to satisfy Islamist parties, set the scene for a controversial education bill signed into law in July 2003.

On 9 May 2017, Indonesian politician Basuki Tjahaja Purnama was sentenced to two years in prison by the North Jakarta District Court after being found guilty of committing blasphemy. The case later led to a growth in the movement against electing non-Islamic leaders, with 59 percent of Indonesian people not wanting to elect non-Muslim leaders as of 2018. It also contributed in increasing number of identity politics in Indonesia as carried out by Anies Baswedan in 2017, which he referred as inevitable because identity is always related as a nature of the candidate.

=== Shari'a in Aceh ===
Shari'a generated debate and concern during 2004, and many of the issues raised touched on religious freedom. Aceh remained the only part of the country where the central Government specifically authorised shari'a. Law 18/2001 granted Aceh special autonomy and included authority for Aceh to establish a system of shari'a as an adjunct to, not a replacement for, national civil and criminal law. Before it could take effect, the law required the provincial legislature to approve local regulations ("qanun") incorporating shari'a precepts into the legal code. Law 18/2001 states that the shari'a courts would be "free from outside influence by any side." Article 25(3) states that the authority of the court will only apply to Muslims. Article 26(2) names the national Supreme Court as the court of appeal for Aceh's shari'a courts.

Aceh is the only province that has shari'a courts. Religious leaders responsible for drafting and implementing the shari'a regulations stated that they had no plans to apply criminal sanctions for violations of shari'a. Islamic law in Aceh, they said, would not provide for strict enforcement of fiqh or hudud, but rather would codify traditional Acehnese Islamic practice and values such as discipline, honesty, and proper behaviour. They claimed enforcement would not depend on the police but rather on public education and societal consensus.

Because Muslims make up the overwhelming majority of Aceh's population, the public largely accepted shari'a, which in most cases merely regularised common social practices. For example, a majority of women in Aceh already covered their heads in public. Provincial and district governments established shari'a bureaus to handle public education about the new system, and local Islamic leaders, especially in North Aceh and Pidie, called for greater government promotion of shari'a as a way to address mounting social ills. The imposition of martial law in Aceh in May 2003 had little impact on the implementation of shari'a. The Martial Law Administration actively promoted shari'a as a positive step toward social reconstruction and reconciliation. Some human rights and women's rights activists complained that implementation of shari'a focused on superficial issues, such as proper Islamic dress, while ignoring deep-seated moral and social problems, such as corruption.

=== Ahmadiyya ===
In 1980 the Indonesian Council of Ulamas (MUI) issued a "fatwa" (a legal opinion or decree issued by an Islamic religious leader) declaring that the Ahmadis are not a legitimate form of Islam. In the past, mosques and other facilities belonging to Ahmadis had been damaged by offended Muslims in Indonesia; more recently, rallies have been held demanding that the sect be banned and some religious clerics have demanded Ahmadis be killed.

=== Youth radicalization ===
Since the mid-2010s there has been a trend of radicalization among the youth, and a nationally representative survey done in 2019 by Alvara found out that around 60% of the generation Z (aged 14–21) and millennials (aged 22–29) identified as "puritan & ultraconservative". Observers link it to the influence of the Wahhabist Hijrah movement, something that the Indonesian government wants to curb as it feels it threatens the country's secular values and unity.

== See also ==
- Abangan
- Glossary of Islam
- Index of Islam-related articles
- Islam in East Java
- Islam in West Sumatra
- Islam in Central Sulawesi
- Islam Nusantara
- Outline of Islam
- Religion in Indonesia
