= Ma'had Al-Zaytun =

Modern pesantren school in Indramayu, West Java, Indonesia

Location
- Mekarjaya Village, Gantar; Indramayu, West Jawa; Indonesia; 6°31′36″S 108°0′13″E

Information
- Type: modern Pesantren
- Motto: Bashthotan fil 'ilmi wal jismi (Has extensive knowledge and a mighty body)
- Established: August 27, 1999; 27 years ago
- Founder: Yayasan Pesantren Indonesia (YPI)
- Head teacher: Panji Gumilang
- Affiliation: Madhhab of Sukarno (Note: Panji Gumilang, leader of the Al-Zaytun, describes himself as a follower of the "madhhab of Sukarno", a statement that is opposed by many Indonesian Muslims and causes Panji Gumilang to be judged as a heretic.)
- Website: www.al-zaytun.ac.id

Ma'had Al-Zaytun or Al-Zaytun Islamic Boarding School (Indonesian: Pondok Pesantren Al-Zaytun) is an Islamic boarding school located in Indramayu Regency, West Java. This Islamic boarding school is a business of the Yayasan Pesantren Indonesia (Indonesian Islamic Boarding School Foundation, YPI), which began construction on August 13, 1996. The initial opening of the lesson was held on July 1, 1999, and the general inauguration was held on August 27, 1999, by the 3rd President of Indonesia, BJ Habibie.

This Islamic boarding school is called by The Washington Times (August 29, 2005) as "The largest Islamic madrasah in Southeast Asia." This Islamic boarding school stands on an area of 1,200 hectares. It was recorded that in 2011 there were around 7,000 students attending this Islamic boarding school. These students come from various regions in Indonesia and abroad, such as Malaysia, Singapore, Timor Leste, and South Africa. This Islamic boarding school is also known mainly because of the various controversies carried out by the board's leader, Panji Gumilang, and the connection between this Islamic boarding school and Darul Islam movement.

== History ==
Yayasan Pendidikan Indonesia (mean Indonesian Education Foundation, and abbreviated YPI) was founded on June 1, 1993, with a deed of establishment dated January 2, 1994 at the notary Mrs. li Rokayah Sulaiman, SH. There is confusion regarding how YPI was able to control thousands of hectares of land without any formal relationship with the Suharto family or the Indonesian Association of Muslim Intellectuals (ICMI). Panji Gumilang, the founder of YPI stated,

We have absolutely nothing to do with the Cendana Family [referring to the Soeharto Family] or conglomerates ... everything can run [smoothly], because many servants of Allah who waqf their land, buildings and livestock here.

In 1995, YPI initiated physical construction, and formed a team of engineers who were later called Tanmiyah Ma'had al-Zaytun to start what they called the "Al-Zaytun Islamic Boarding School Project." The "development employees" were then recruited from members of a number of religious study groups. It was recorded that there were 1,550 employees involved in the initial development of Al-Zaytun at that time. In 1999, Al-Zaytun began recruiting teachers and murabbi, and announced the acceptance of 1,584 new students, which after re-selection became 1,459 students. In August 1999, the 3rd President of Indonesia, BJ Habibie inaugurated the Al-Zaytun Islamic Boarding School.

Abduh Umar noted that there was a connection between Al-Zaytun and Abu Totok, the founder of Darul Islam (Indonesian Islamic State, often known as NII) KW 9. In the end, the name "Abu Totok" was associated with Panji Gumilang itself. Al-Zaytun is also thought to have a mysterious "project", and is described as an anti-social Islamic boarding school by residents of three nearby villages. Umar also noted that Al-Zaytun's explanations to local residents were also considered foreign, such as "The project for Allah, at the same time belongs to ABRI, and for Madinah II [sic]."

== Curriculum ==
This Islamic boarding school has a foundation called "Pesantren spirit but modern system", using curriculum which refers to the same system used by Ministry of Religious Affairs of Indonesia and Ministry of Education, Culture, Research, and Technology. Local content is also provided to students, such as Medina Charter and Human Rights as well as Journalism. Apart from that, students are equipped with didactic skills so they can teach the knowledge they have gained while studying at this Islamic boarding school. Al-Zaytun students said that they were taught an open and tolerant Islam, avoiding divisions such as Sunni and Shia sects, and accepting adherents of other religions, as written by the Post-Gazette, "Students at the school say they are taught an open, tolerant version of Islam, eschewing divisions such as Sunni and Shiite and accepting adherents of other religions."

== Educational level ==
=== Formal education ===
Ma'had Al-Zaytun's education system adheres to the One Pipe Education Systemnamely a sustainable education system from early childhood to tertiary level, as follows:

1. Early childhood education (PAUD)
2. Elementary school known as Madrasah Ibtidaiyah (MI) Al-Zaytun
3. Junior High School known as Madrasah Tsanawiyah (MTs) Al-Zaytun combined with Senior High School, Madrasah Aliyah (MA) Al-Zaytun.
4. Adult class education (pursue package A, B, C)
5. The university is called the Al-Zaytun Indonesian Islamic Institute

There are a number of faculties or study programs at the Al-Zaytun Islamic Institute, as follows:

- Faculty of Tarbiyah
1. Madrasah Ibtidaiyah Teacher Education (PGMI)
2. Arabic Language Education (PBA)
- Faculty of Sharia
1. Constitutional law (Siyasah)
2. Sharia Economic Law (Muamalah)
- Faculty of Da'wa
1. Islamic Communication and Broadcasting (KPI)
2. Da'wa Management (MD)

=== Non-formal education ===
==== ICDL-AGICT ====
Al-Zaytun computer education collaborates with the International Computer Driving License (ICDL) institution for basic level computer use certification. In 2002, ICDL Al-Zaytun Global Information and Communication Technology (ICDL-AGICT) was founded. On January 3, 2003, ICDL-AGICT received accreditation from ICDL head office, in London, United Kingdom as the first test center for the entire Indonesian region.

In December 2006 ICDL Licensee in Indonesia, or ICDL AGICT, as an extension of ICDL's head office in Indonesia, succeeded in establishing a cooperation agreement with the Director General of Out-of-School Education (PLS), Ministry of National Education, to provide computer mastery training to non-formal education regional technical implementation units.

With the accreditation it has, ICDL-AGICT has the right to recruit participants, conduct training using the ICDL syllabus and curriculum, and carry out a series of tests for training participants to obtain ICDL certification. On 12–18 March 2007 Al-Zaytun carried out ICDL certification training for 39 civil servants (PNS) who served in the Regional Technical Implementation Unit (UPT), Out-of-school education. Participants came from 17 regions throughout Indonesia. Computer education collaborates with the NCC Education institution for computer education up to Master's level.

==== PKBM ====
For the surrounding community, via "Pusat Kegiatan Belajar Masyarakat" ("Learning centers"), Al-Zaytun opens adult classes for skills such as animal husbandry, agriculture, carpentry and also KF (Functional Literacy) classes for those who cannot yet read and write.

== Facility ==
=== Mosque ===
In the area of this Islamic boarding school there is a Rahmatan Lil-Alamin Mosque which is still under construction. This mosque measures six hectares and has six floors with a capacity of up to 100,000 people. There is also the Al-Hayat Mosque which can accommodate 7,000 people.

=== Learning building and student dormitory ===
Al-Zaytun has a building for teaching and learning. The building is the Abu Bakr building (written as Gedung Abu Bakar Al Siddiq), Umar building (written as Gedung Umar Ibnu Khaththab), Uthman building (written as Gedung Utsman Ibnu Affan), and Ali building (written as Gedung Ali bin Abi Thalib) all of which are the names of friends of the Islamic prophet Muhammad and members of the Rashidun Caliph in Sunni Islam. Meanwhile, two more buildings are named after the first and second Presidents of Indonesia, Sukarno and Suharto.

Apart from having buildings for teaching and learning, buildings called dormitories include Al-Mushthofa Dormitory, Al-Fajr Dormitory, Al-Nur Dormitory, Al-Madani Dormitory, Friendship Dormitory, and the Syarifah Hidayatullah Dormitory will be built.

== Integrated Agriculture Program ==
To build independence, this Islamic boarding school implements the Integrated Agriculture Program. This program includes agriculture, animal husbandry and fisheries as one interrelated unit. Various technologies are studied and applied in the field, including tissue culture, plant breeding and nursery technology, embryo transfer and artificial insemination, milking technology, pasteurization technology for milk processing, technology for making silage, technology for making fertilizer from livestock manure, human waste and human urine, making fertilizer from leaves and technology for making bocas fertilizer and vermicompost.

Alumni of the Integrated Agricultural Education Program (P3T) are immediately employed to manage the land at this Islamic boarding school and handle savings and credit cooperatives in collaboration with village communities around the Islamic boarding school, as well as providing counseling to increase agricultural output in surrounding village communities. Mekarjaya-Ma'had Al Zaytun Village Cooperative Society (MKDM-MAZ) helps the community with capital for rice farming.

== Performance ==
=== Sports field ===
Al-Zaytun was the host of the first Pekan Olahraga dan Seni antar Pondok Pesantren Tingkat Nasional (abbreviated POSPENAS, mean "National Level Sports and Arts Week between Islamic Boarding Schools") which was held in 2001, and was attended by 2,668 sportsmen, artists and officials from all provinces and was opened by Minister of National Education, A. Malik Fajar. Al-Zaytun is also said to have won a number of hockey championships.

== Controversies ==
=== Initial controversy ===
In 2002, Indonesian Ulema Council (MUI) conducted research on this Islamic boarding school and the results stated that there was a leadership and financial connection between Ma'had Al-Zaytun and Darul Islam (NII) KW 9.

Responding to issues that then developed in society regarding the connection between the Al-Zaytun Islamic Boarding School and the NII in 2011, TNI Commander General Moeldoko, who at that time served as commander of Kodam III/Siliwangi, took the initiative to communicate between the two parties; both from Panji Gumilang as the caretaker of the Al-Zaytun Islamic Boarding School and certain community groups. As a result, the issue that Al-Zaytun Islamic Boarding School educates students to reject Pancasila is not proven. Moeldoko said, "Now let's see the results, the communication style that I use. There are no more suspicions. This is a communication problem".

The former Head of the State Intelligence Agency, Hendropriyono denied that the Al-Zaytun Islamic Boarding School was said to be a nest for the NII group. He admitted that he often visited the Islamic boarding school. In the book Al-Zaytun Sumber Inspirasi Bermasyarakat, Berbangsa, dan Bernegara, a book written by Drs. Ch. Robin Simanullang, Hendopriyono emphasized:

"Al-Zaytun teaches tolerance and peace, teaches Pancasila and educates his students to become good citizens of the Republic of Indonesia, according to the curriculum of the Ministry of National Education and the Ministry of Religion of the Republic of Indonesia. That's the truth. But other people are still accused by the Indonesian Islamic State or NII [refers to Darul Islam]. How could NII teach Pancasila? Doesn't NII oppose and disbelieve Pancasila and the Republic of Indonesia?"

According to Hendopriyono, proof that the Islamic boarding school is not an Darul Islam headquarters can be seen from several things, one of them is the result of research by the Ministry of Religion team, which states that none of the teachings in the Islamic boarding school violate Islamic teachings.

One of the alumni of the Al-Zaytun Islamic Boarding School who comes from Palangka Raya City, Central Kalimantan Province, objected to the institution where he studied being accused of being a nest for the Darul Islam. He admitted that he had never found any suspicious indications such as the application of Radicalism and NII. "..."Don't think that one of the Islamic boarding school administrators was a former subordinate of Kartosoewiryo, who once built this Islamic boarding school, so that Al-Zaytun got involved in the NII movement," he said.

Meanwhile, the leader of the Islamic boarding school, Panji Gumilang responded to these issues by saying that according to Indonesian history, the NII problem had been resolved in 1962. Regarding financial issues, Panji Gumilang explained that everything was obtained from student money and the Islamic boarding school's economic efforts. For example, rice farming and teak plantations. Apart from that, he said that several of his friends provided financial assistance.

=== 2023 ===
At the beginning of the year 2023, a video upload circulated showing Panji Gumilang and the authority of Ma'had Al-Zaytun performing ʿĪd prayer for Eid al-Fitr 1444 AH. The video shows that women's prayer rows are mixed with men's, this is different from most Muslim prayer procedures. In fact, it was reported that there was one non-Muslim who joined the prayers in the row. Meanwhile, the head of the Islamic boarding school, Panji Gumilang argued that the prayer rows which were not meeting were related to the order to make room for seating in the assembly which according to him was stated in the Al-Qur'an, while non-Muslims were allowed to join in the prayers. under the pretext of tolerance. The woman seen on the front row is Panji's wife. Panji said that the reason his wife was in the front row was to show that Islam honors women.

Chairman of the Indonesian Ulema Council (MUI) for the Indramayu region, KH Satori, said that the Indramayu ulama themselves did not know what school of thought Al-Zaytun adhered to. Furthermore, he stated that the MUI had received no transparency regarding the teachings of this Islamic boarding school. Meanwhile, Panji Gumilang is said to have described himself (as well as his Islamic boarding school) as a follower of the "madhhab of Sukarno", different from most Sunni Muslims who adhere to four schools of thought (Hanafi, Maliki, Hanbali, and Shafi'i). Indonesian Muslim preacher, Adi Hidayat claims that this constitutes bidʿah in Islam, while jurisprudence expert Muhammad Shiddiq al-Jawi stated that Sukarno, the first President of Indonesia, was not an expert in jurisprudence; so it is impossible to declare oneself as a follower of the Sukarno school of thought. In connection with the controversy over the ʿĪd prayer, the MUI and Ministry of Religion of the Republic of Indonesia claimed that the ʿĪd prayer was still valid, but the law was makruh.

On June 15, 2023, a group of people in the name of "Forum Indramayu Menggugat" (Indramayu Forum Sues) held a demonstration at the entrance to the Al-Zaytun Islamic boarding school. This demonstration was motivated by the Ma'had party which reportedly allows free sexual relations (which in Islam is referred to as zina and has been forbidden by Islamic teachings) with the condition of redeeming it with 2 million Rupiah. This has also sparked new controversy in early mid-2023, in which a number of prominent Indonesian clerics, including Buya Yahya, Abdul Somad, and Rizieq Shihab, claimed that Al-Zaytun taught heretical teachings to his students and even asked for the closure of this Islamic boarding school.

== Bibliography ==
- Simanullang, Ch. Robin (Christian Robin) (2015). Al-Zaytun sumber inspirasi : bermasyarakat, berbangsa, dan bernegara (Cetakan pertama ed.). Jakarta: Pustaka Tokoh Indonesia. pp. ix–x. ISBN 9786029712254. OCLC 933291139.
- Halim, Abdul; Nawawi; Abdurrazaq, Kholish (2007). Al-Zaytun International Education Center, Profile 2007. Indramayu: Yayasan Pesantren Indonesia.
- Crouch, Melissa (12 November 2013). Law and Religion in Indonesia: Conflict and the courts in West Java. Taylor & Francis. pp. 99–. ISBN 978-1-134-50836-5.
- Umar, Abduh (2001). Membongkar gerakan sesat NII di balik pesantren mewah al-Zaytun (in Indonesian). Gema Insani.
- Baedowi, Ahmad, ed. (2011). Al-Zaytun the Untold Stories: Investigasi terhadap Pesantren Paling Kontroversial di Indonesia (in Indonesian). Pustaka Alvabet. ISBN 978-602-9193-09-1.
