= Jami Syekh Abdul Hamid Abulung Mosque =

Mosque in Banjar, South Kalimantan, Indonesia

- Masjid Jami Syekh Abdul Hamid Abulung
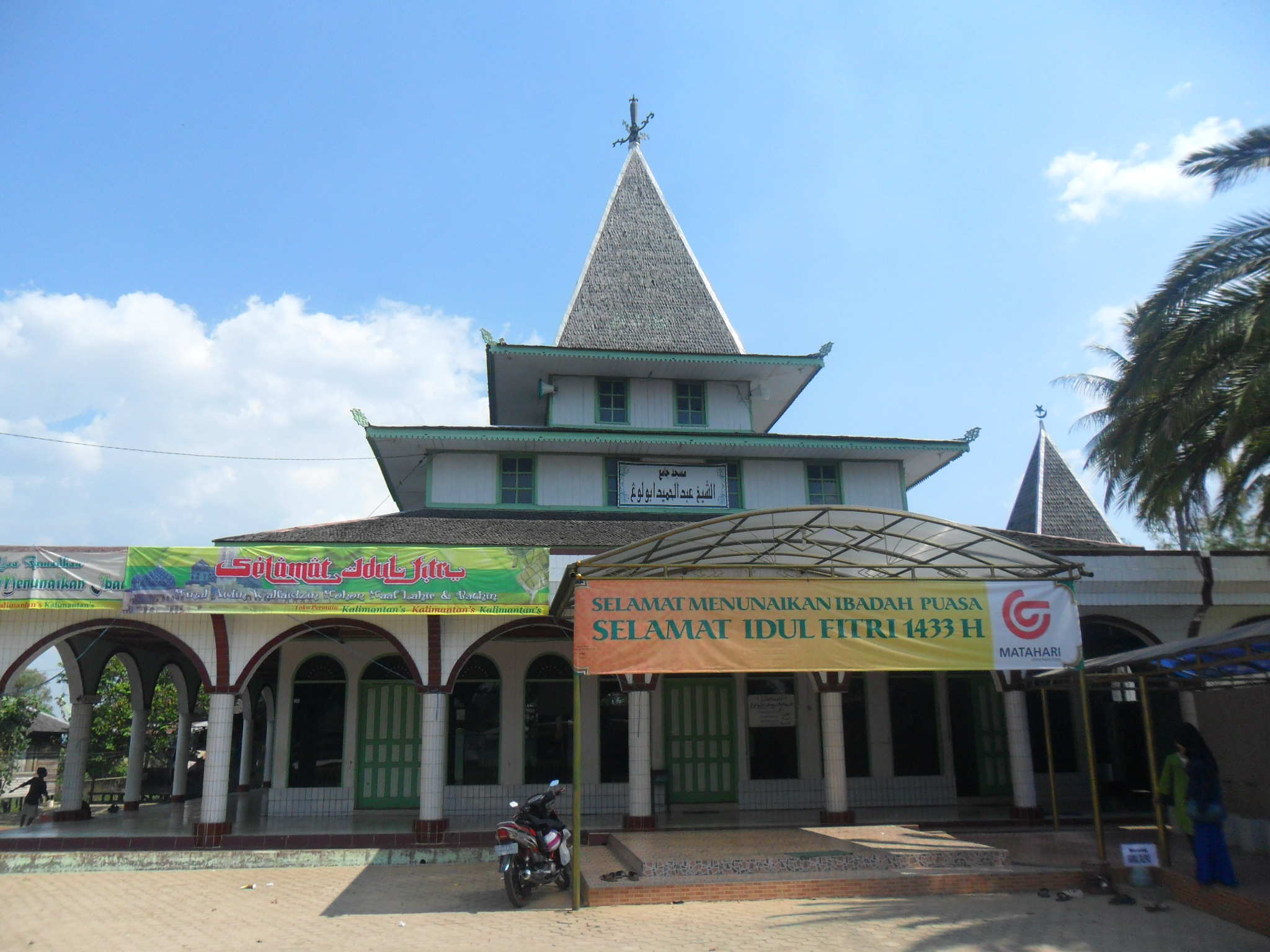

Religion
- Affiliation: Islam
- Branch/tradition: Sunni

Location
- Location: Martapura, Banjar, South Kalimantan, Indonesia
- Interactive map of Jami Syekh Abdul Hamid Abulung Mosque

Architecture
- Type: Mosque
- Founder: Sultan Tahmidullah II

The Jami Syekh Abdul Hamid Abulung Mosque (Indonesian: Masjid Jami Syekh Abdul Hamid Abulung), also known as Datu Abulung Mosque, is an old mosque in South Kalimantan province, Indonesia, which is located in Sungai Batang village, West Martapura district, Martapura. The mosque was built by the king of Banjar, Sultan Tahmidullah II who ruled the area during 1761 to 1801, as a form of retribution for ordering the executions of Datu Abulung, a scholar who had been accused of heresy. The mosque is one of the cultural heritages in Martapura.
