= List of Bewitched episodes =

Bewitched is an American fantasy situation comedy originally broadcast for eight seasons on ABC from 1964 to 1972. 254 half-hour episodes were produced. The first 74 half-hour episodes were filmed in black-and-white for Seasons 1 and 2 (but are now also available in colorized versions on DVD); the remaining 180 half-hour episodes were filmed in color. Film dates are the dates the Screen Gems distribution company reported the episode was "finished". In many cases, that means that the major portion of the episode was filmed days—maybe weeks—earlier, and pick-ups and insert shots were done on the completion date. (For instance, episodes 2–7 were all "completed" on September 11, 1964.)

== Series overview ==
Season	Episodes	Originally released		Rank	Rating
Season	Episodes	First released	Last released	Rank	Rating
1	36	September 17, 1964	June 3, 1965	2	31.0
2	38	September 16, 1965	June 9, 1966	7	25.9 (Note: Tied with The Beverly Hillbillies)
3	33	September 15, 1966	May 4, 1967	7	23.4 (Note: Tied with Daktari and The Beverly Hillbillies)
4	33	September 7, 1967	May 16, 1968	11	23.5
5	30	September 26, 1968	April 24, 1969	11	23.3 (Note: Tied with Mission: Impossible and The Red Skelton Show)
6	30	September 18, 1969	April 16, 1970	24	20.6 (Note: Tied with NBC Saturday Night at the Movies and The F.B.I.)
7	28	September 24, 1970	April 22, 1971	—N/a	—N/a
8	26	September 15, 1971	March 25, 1972	72	11.3

Dick York missed a total of 14 episodes during his five years on the show (1964–1969). The first absence was due to a bereavement in his family; the other 13 were absences due to a degenerative back ailment that limited his mobility. These latter episodes are denoted with †.

== Episodes ==
=== Season 1 (1964–65) ===
Episodes were originally filmed in black-and-white, though they were later colorized.

No. overall	No. in season	Title	Directed by	Written by	Original release date
1	1	"I, Darrin, Take This Witch, Samantha"	William Asher	Sol Saks	September 17, 1964
In the pilot episode, strangers Samantha (Elizabeth Montgomery) and Darrin (Dick York) meet one another by bumping into each other several times. They fall in love and get married. On their wedding night, Samantha's witch mother, Endora (Agnes Moorehead), visits Samantha. She is shocked to learn her new husband is a mortal and predicts the marriage will not last. Before he can enter the bedroom, Endora puts him in the hotel lobby. Samantha tells Darrin she is a witch and proves it. Darrin is shocked, but realizes he loves Samantha and cannot give her up. He tells her he wants her to become a suburban housewife and refrain from using magic. At McMann and Tate, where Darrin works in advertising, Sheila Sommers (Nancy Kovack) comes by to see him. Sheila is an ex-girlfriend and she invites Darrin and Samantha over for a casual dinner party. That night the dinner party turns out to be quite formal. Sheila is very condescending to Samantha. Samantha uses her powers to get back at Sheila. At home, Darrin admits Sheila had it coming, but he still wants Samantha to try harder to not use witchcraft. Notes: Rehearsal for the pilot was to begin on November 22, 1963, but was ultimately postponed due to the assassination of John F. Kennedy. Filming was completed December 6 of that year.; Elizabeth Montgomery would give birth to her first child seven months later, on July 24, 1964.; Nancy Kovack's character of Sheila was originally intended to be an occasionally recurring nemesis of Darrin and Samantha, but did not appear again until the fourth season episode "Snob in the Grass".; Gene Blakely's character of Dave, a drinking companion of Darrin's, would recur very occasionally in seasons 1 through 4, as would Paul Barselow's bartender character (who at various times was credited as Al, Joe, Pete or Max). C. Lindsay Workman would also appear in a few later episodes as Dr. Koblin (the character he plays here), as well as playing other roles throughout the series run.; Narrated by an uncredited José Ferrer, who would also narrate episodes 2 and 4 before being dropped from the show.; In a few early episodes, characters would break the fourth wall and address the audience directly. In this episode, Darrin does so.
2	2	"Be It Ever So Mortgaged"	William Asher	Barbara Avedon	September 24, 1964
Endora is still surprised that Sam is willing to do housework without using magic. Darrin comes home and Endora hides because she wants to get an idea what he is like. Despite it being a little beyond their means, Darrin has found a house he would like to buy. Endora thinks it is silly that Samantha would tie herself down to an earthly home. Sam and Endora go to see the house. It is newly built so there's no landscaping or furnishings. Sam and Endora use some magic to landscape around the house. Nosy neighbor Gladys Kravitz (Alice Pearce) sees the landscaping and goes to tell her husband Abner (George Tobias). When Abner goes to look, the yard is barren. Sam and Endora then use magic to see what the interior would look like furnished. Gladys goes to the house, looks in the window and sees the furniture. When she looks again it has gone. Gladys becomes shocked and hysterical. Darrin comes by and Endora leaves before Darrin can meet her. Gladys comes to the door and Darrin thinks she is Endora. Notes: This episode was completed along with the next five episodes on September 11, 1964. Filming needed to work around Elizabeth Montgomery's first pregnancy. William Asher Jr. was born July 24, 1964.; First episode to feature the Kravitzes, and first episode to feature Samantha and Darrin's house at 1164 Morning Glory Circle.; Endora breaks the fourth wall to address the audience in this episode.
3	3	"It Shouldn't Happen to a Dog"	William Asher	Jerry Davis	October 1, 1964
Samantha is preparing dinner for Darrin's potential client, baby food maker Rex Barker (Jack Warden). That night at the dinner party, alcoholic and lecherous Rex makes several passes at Samantha. She decides to teach him a lesson by turning him into a dog. After the party, Sam tells Darrin what she did to Rex. Sam gets upset when Darrin seems to care more about his possible account with Rex than the fact that Rex assaulted her. She kicks Darrin and the dog out of the bedroom. Because of a cat that Endora put outside, the dog runs away. Samantha chases the dog and changes it back into Rex. A Policeman (Karl Lukas) comes by and Sam changes Rex back into a dog and it runs away again. The next morning, Sam gets the dog back and brings it to Darrin's office, where she changes it back to Rex. Rex does not remember anything about being a dog. When Rex makes another pass at Sam, Darrin knocks him cold. Rex winds up giving Darrin his account. Grace Lee Whitney appears as Babs Livingston. Note: First episode to feature David White as Larry Tate, and Irene Vernon as Louise Tate.
4	4	"Mother Meets What's-His-Name"	William Asher	Story by : Sol Saks; Teleplay by : Danny Arnold	October 8, 1964
Samantha is visited by Gladys Kravitz, June Foster (Alice Backes) and Shirley Clyde, the Morning Glory Circle Welcome Committee. The ladies showed up with three little boys, who immediately start running around the house. June is slightly condescending and she and Shirley are clearly snooping in an attempt to see what things look like inside the house. They have cake and coffee and Sam has to use a little magic. The boys run into Endora upstairs. Something strange happens to them and Gladys is puzzled as a result. After they leave, Endora tells Sam that all mortals are the same. Sam says that Darrin is not like them and she wants Endora to finally meet him. Endora refers to Darrin as "What's his name" and she agrees to come to dinner. That night, Darrin is quite nervous about meeting Endora. Despite the fact that Endora uses her magic, Darrin tries to be very cordial. Darrin tells Endora that they can get along without witchcraft. They have a heated exchange before Endora leaves. Note: This episode was intended to be the third, not the fourth episode. The plot with Gladys Kravitz follows directly on from episode 2, and the Stephens (who have just moved in) do not have their phone connected, nor do they yet have any cutlery or plates for guests—despite having held an elaborate dinner function for numerous guests in the episode just aired one week previously.
5	5	"Help, Help, Don't Save Me"	William Asher	Danny Arnold	October 15, 1964
Darrin has been spending all hours working on his Caldwell Soup advertising campaign. Caldwell Soup has been losing market share and are thinking of going to another agency. Samantha suggests some clever slogans and Darrin loves them. But then he suspects Samantha of using magic to help. Darrin has lunch with Mr. Caldwell (Charlie Ruggles) and shows him one of his original campaigns. Caldwell is not impressed. Darrin for a second thinks of using one of Sam's suggestions, but does not. That night Darrin and Sam get into an argument, he calls her a liar and she leaves home. The next day, Darrin shows Larry Sam's ideas passing them off as his. Larry loves them. Darrin and Larry pitch Sam's slogans to Caldwell. He does not like them at all. Darrin now realizes Sam did not use any magic. Darrin goes back to his empty house and apologizes to Sam. Sam comes back and forgives him. Something Sam says gives Darrin a great idea and he wins back the Caldwell account.
6	6	"Little Pitchers Have Big Fears"	William Asher	Barbara Avedon	October 22, 1964
Darrin learns that Samantha has made friends with Marshall Burns (Jimmy Mathers), a little boy who lives down the street. Sam tells Darrin that Marshall has no friends or father and an overprotective mother (June Lockhart). To help Marshall gain self-confidence, Sam takes him to Little League Baseball tryouts. Marshall is not doing too well pitching. Samantha uses her magic to help him. Sam tells Darrin that Marshall made the team. Darrin is against her using witchcraft to help the boy. That night they find Marshall in their backyard. He says he is running away from home because his mother will not let him play on the team. Mrs. Burns comes by and Sam and Darrin try to show her that she is being too protective. Mrs. Burns tells them to stay away from Marshall. The next day Mrs. Burns thinks Marshall has run away again. Sam says he probably went to play in the baseball game. They go to the game. Marshall does gain self-confidence and hits the game winning home run. His mother realizes that she needs to let him do the things that little boys do. Byron Keith as Coach Gribben. Joe Brooks as Umpire.
7	7	"The Witches Are Out"	William Asher	Bernard Slade	October 29, 1964
Elderly witches Bertha (Reta Shaw) and Mary (Madge Blake) are visiting Samantha. Sam's Aunt Clara, whose witchcraft is not as good as it used to be, then shows up. They're sad that the world still sees witches as ugly old hags. Sam thinks Darrin might be able to help them. Meanwhile, Darrin's latest client, Mr. Brinkman (Shelley Berman), wants to use a stereotypical ugly witch to promote his Halloween candy. When Sam sees some of Darrin's sketches of an ugly witch, she is understandably upset. Darrin suggests to Brinkman that he updates his campaign and use a beautiful witch. Brinkman is not impressed. Darrin tells Larry to put someone else on the account and he quits. Sam recruits Bertha, Mary and Clara to help get Darrin's job back. The foursome team up to give Brinkman a taste of his own medicine. Darrin gets back to work and Brinkman goes along with the updated campaign. Notes: Marion Lorne makes her first of 28 appearances as Aunt Clara.; Reta Shaw debuts as Bertha, a role she would return to later in the season. She would later be one of the many actresses to play the similar recurring role of Aunt Hagatha.; Madge Blake as Mary makes her only appearance. She is one of the only witches in the entire series whose name does not end with an 'a' (or an 'ah' sound).
8	8	"The Girl Reporter"	William Asher	Paul David & John L. Greene	November 5, 1964
Liza Randall (Cheryl Holdridge), a local junior college student, comes by the house to interview Darrin for her college newspaper. She seems quite taken with Darrin and he is enjoying the attention. Samantha is a little surprised that Darrin invited her to his office the next morning. The next day, Liza arrives at the house all dressed up. After she and Darrin leave, her large football player of a fiancé, Marvin "Monster" Grogan (Roger Ewing), drops by. He is not happy about Liza being with Darrin. Sam invites Marvin in. Meanwhile, at the office, Liza starts to flirt with Darrin. Sam feeds Marvin to keep him distracted. Liza makes some cocktails for her and Darrin. Larry and Mr. Austen come by the office and find Liza, who just tripped, laying on top of Darrin. Sam talks to Marvin and he begins to have feelings for Samantha. Darrin and Liza come home. Darrin kicks Liza and Marvin out. Sam can tell Darrin is jealous and they have a little fight. Liza and Marvin come back and Sam uses magic when Marvin tries to hit Darrin. In the end, the two couples work things out.
9	9	"Witch or Wife"	William Asher	Bernard Slade	November 12, 1964
Larry will be going on a business trip to Paris and his wife Louise (Irene Vernon) will be going with. He asks Darrin to take over his work will he is gone. This means very long hours at the office and Samantha does not see Darrin much. Sam is bored and lonely. She agrees to have lunch in Paris with Endora. After lunch, Sam and Endora go to a fashion show. While there, they run into Larry and Louise. Larry insists they have dinner together. When Sam steps away from the table, Larry calls Darrin and then has Sam talk to him. Later, Sam returns home. Things do not go well with Darrin and Sam goes back to Paris. Larry returns early and leaves Louise with Sam and Endora. Larry tells Darrin that Sam is miserable. Darrin flies to Paris, but Sam has come home. Sam joins Darrin on the plane. They make up and fly to Paris together. Raquel Welch (in a bit role, and not seen clearly) plays the stewardess on Darrin's flight. Note: As happens in a few early episodes, Endora breaks the fourth wall at the episode's conclusion, and addresses the audience directly.
10	10	"Just One Happy Family"	William Asher	Fred Freeman & Lawrence J. Cohen	November 19, 1964
Endora tells Samantha that her father, Maurice (Maurice Evans), is coming to visit her home that evening. Sam is looking forward to seeing him, but she knows he does not approve of marriages between mortals and witches. Sam tells Darrin about Maurice and the terrible temper which he has. She asks Darrin not to be around until she is explains things to Maurice. Maurice arrives with gifts for Sam and Endora. Meanwhile, Darrin is having a drink with Larry. Larry says that if he loves Sam, he should stand up to Maurice. Darrin calls Sam and tells her he is coming home. She locks him in a phone booth. Maurice learns Darrin is mortal and is not happy. Darrin comes home and confronts Maurice. Maurice makes him disappear. Endora is furious, and Samantha tells Maurice she loves Darrin and not to take him away from her. Maurice brings Darrin back. They all have dinner together and Darrin even has Maurice's favorite champagne. Joseph V. Perry as TV Repairman. Note: Maurice Evans debuts in the occasional role of Maurice.
11	11	"It Takes One to Know One"	William Asher	Jack Sher	November 26, 1964
Endora shows Samantha several pictures of women that she found in Darrin's briefcase. Sam is not concerned. It turns out that Darrin is searching for a beautiful model to be "Miss Jasmine" for Jasmine Perfume. Janine Fleur (Lisa Seagram) shows up at Darrin's office and Darrin and Larry have found who they are looking for. After a photo shoot, Janine asks Darrin to lunch. When he says he is to meet Sam, Janine says he should find another model. Darrin cancels his lunch date with Sam to talk to Janine. Sam takes Endora to where Darrin is lunching with Janine to prove there's nothing going on. Samantha recognizes Janine as Sarah Baker the witch. Sam learns that Endora brought Sarah in to seduce Darrin. She tells Sarah to stay away from Darrin. Sarah is determined to fulfill what she set out to do, despite Endora calling off the contract. Samantha, who still has faith in her husband, tells Sarah to not use any tricks and let Darrin act of his own feel will. Sam does have to help Darrin as Sarah is still playing dirty. In the end, Sarah's scheme does not work.
12	12	"...And Something Makes Three"	William Asher	Danny Arnold	December 3, 1964
Louise Tate calls Samantha and says that she needs to see her right away. Louise comes by and tells Sam that after 16 years of marriage, she is going to be a mother. She is afraid to tell Larry because she thinks he hates children. Coming out of his dentist's office, Larry sees Louise and Sam going into an obstetrician's office. Something he overhears leads Larry to think Darrin is about to become a father. Larry tells Darrin the news. Sam calls Darrin and tells him she would like to have Larry and Louise over for dinner that night. Darrin has a daydream about Samantha having "witch" children. That night, Darrin and Larry both bring Sam flowers and fawn all over her. Louise tries to tell Larry about the baby, but does not. Sam finally tells everyone. Larry is thrilled. In a subplot, Gladys sees Samantha swimming in the Stephens' backyard—where normally, there is no pool. Notes: Filmed October 22, 1964.; In Darrin's fantasy, he and Samantha have at least seven children, five of whom are named: Maurice, Endora, Samuel, Rebecca, and Juilus. None of the child actors are credited (though several have lines); a very young Maureen McCormick plays Little Endora.
13	13	"Love Is Blind"	William Asher	Roland Wolpert	December 10, 1964
Samantha would like to find a boyfriend for her plain friend Gertrude (Kit Smythe). She thinks Darrin may know of an eligible bachelor at the office. Sam suggests that Darrin ask handsome artist, Kermit (Adam West). Darrin believes that Kermit is happy playing the field and he is not interested in a steady girlfriend, but he will ask him. It is Friday night and Kermit comes by for dinner and meets Gertrude. When Kermit is instantly attracted to Gertrude, Darrin asks Sam if she is a witch. Samantha does not really say no. Kermit has been seeing Gertrude every night for a week. Darrin still thinks she is a witch. Darrin hopes to break up the budding romance by calling on model Susan (Chris Noel), Kermit's ex-girlfriend. Darrin, Sam and Kermit are at a restaurant. Kermit mentions how much he likes Gertrude and he is thinking about marriage. Kermit is surprised when Susan comes by. Sam uses a little magic to get rid of her. Gertrude comes by and Kermit asks her to marry him. Kermit and Gertrude are before a Minister and get married. Note: Filmed October 29, 1964.
14	14	"Samantha Meets the Folks"	William Asher	Bernard Slade	December 17, 1964
Aunt Clara comes by and says she is staying for the weekend. Turns out Darrin's parents, whom Samantha has not yet met, are coming for the weekend as well. Clara says she will leave, but Sam wants her to stay for moral support. Phyllis (Mabel Albertson) and Frank (Robert F. Simon) arrive. Phyllis spends some time with Sam. Clara comes in the room and meets Darrin, Phyllis and Frank. Darrin is surprised when he learns Clara will be staying the weekend. Clara tells Darrin's parents that she and Sam are witches. Frank finds Clara amusing, but Phyllis is not so sure. Something Clara overhears Phyllis say, makes her want to help Sam be a better housewife. Clara uses magic to make a special dinner. Frank really likes Sam, but Sam does not think Phyllis likes her. Darrin tries to tactfully tell Clara to stop using magic. Sam gets upset when she finds that Clara has left. Samantha confesses that it was actually Aunt Clara who helped her with the food, and that she is still learning how to be a good housekeeper. Phyllis feels better about Sam now. Darrin finds Clara and they all have a nice evening. Note: Filmed November 5, 1964.
15	15	"A Vision of Sugar Plums"	Alan Rafkin	Herman Groves	December 24, 1964
The Orphanage is running a program that allows orphaned children to stay with adults for the Christmas holidays. Abner and Gladys Kravitz tell Mrs. Grange (Sara Seegar) they've come to pick up Tommy Becker. Michael (Billy Mumy) tells Tommy that Christmas is not real and they get into a fight. Later, Samantha and Darrin come to pick up Michael. Mrs. Grange tells Darrin that Michael is a problem child. Sam wants to take him home anyway. Darrin dresses up as Santa, but Michael knows it is him. Michael tells Sam that he does not believe in Santa Claus. Sam tells Michael that she is a witch. She takes him and Darrin to the North Pole. They meet Santa (Cecil Kellaway) and Michael now believes. The next day, Michael brings Tommy a present. Mrs. Grange comes by the Stephens' house with Mr. and Mrs. Johnson (Bill Daily and Gerry Johnson). They are interested in adopting Michael. Note: Filmed November 12, 1964.
16	16	"It's Magic"	Sidney Miller	Tom Waldman & Frank Waldman	January 7, 1965
Samantha learns she is the new entertainment chairwoman for the hospital's fund-raising benefit show. Norman the Waiter (Cliff Norton) recommends a magician to Sam. What Sam has yet to find out is that Zeno the Great (Walter Burke) is down on his luck, he has started drinking and his assistant, Roxie Ames (Virginia Martin), has left him. It is the night of the show and Zeno admits to Samantha that he is not a very good magician. Sam agrees to be his assistant. Zeno's act does not start out well. Sam uses her magic to help the magician gain self-confidence. The next day, Zeno calls Sam and tells her he will be on a TV show. Sam turns down his request to be his assistant again. She agrees with Darrin that Zeno will have to make it on his own. Sam says that she will come to watch him. That night, Roxie returns to capitalize on his newly found fame. Samantha stops the scene-stealing Roxie from taking over the act. Darrin tells Sam that the sponsor wants Zeno on the show for the next 13 weeks. Eddie Ryder as M.C. Note: Filmed November 27, 1964.
17	17	"A Is for Aardvark"	Ida Lupino	Earl Barret	January 14, 1965
Darrin falls down the stairs and twists his ankle. Now confined to his bed, Darrin is running Samantha ragged with requests for things. Samantha suggests enchanting the house so it can fulfill Darrin's needs. Endora tells Sam that the power will go to Darrin's head. Darrin starts encouraging Samantha to use her powers to get the things she wants, but she feels uncomfortable about it. One day Larry comes by and Darrin tells him he wants to retire and travel the world. Larry gets upset and leaves. Darrin tells Sam his plans. Sam tells Endora that she was right about Darrin. Sam hears Darrin on the phone talking about renting out the house. Darrin gives Sam a very sentimental gift he bought before his accident. He tells her he is done some thinking about it and he came to realize he likes his old life better. Notes: Filmed November 18, 1964.; Endora addresses her son-in-law as "Darrin" for the first of only eight times in the series.
18	18	"The Cat's Meow"	David McDearmon	Richard Sale & Mary Sale	January 21, 1965
It is Samantha and Darrin's seven month anniversary. Endora tells Sam it will not be long before Darrin strays. Meanwhile, Darrin and Larry are going over a layout for Countess Margaret's Youth cream with Charlie Godfrey (Harry Holcombe). Charlie likes what he sees, but it has to be approved by Margaret Marshall (Martha Hyer), the chairman of the board. Margaret wants to discuss things with Darrin in Chicago that evening. Larry tells Darrin to not let Margaret know he is married. Darrin tells Sam they will have to postpone their anniversary dinner. In Chicago, Darrin is taken to Margaret's yacht. Capt. Kelly (George Ives) found a cat on the pier. He wants to bring it on the yacht. Darrin suspects the cat is Samantha in disguise. Margaret starts to flirt with Darrin. When Margaret leaves the room to change, Darrin talks to the cat. Margaret comes back and continues to flirt with Darrin. Out on the deck, Darrin sees a pelican and thinks it is Sam. Capt. Kelly sees Darrin talking to the bird and then the cat. Darrin tells Margaret he is married and she says he will still get her account. Darrin brings the cat home and finds out it is not Sam. Clarence Lung as Kujo. Note: Filmed December 3, 1964.
19	19	"A Nice Little Dinner Party"	Sherman Marks	Bernard Slade	January 28, 1965
Samantha and Darrin are talking about how Darrin's father Frank just retired. Sam says she invited his parents over for dinner. She also says Endora will be there. Darrin is worried, but Sam says Endora promised to behave. That evening when Endora arrives, she immediately starts to compliment Frank. Phyllis is getting jealous and annoyed. Frank asks Endora to a play when Phyllis refuses to go. The next morning, Darrin goes to his parents house and Phyllis still will not to go to the play. She tells Darrin that Frank is smitten with Endora. Later, Phyllis tells Darrin she wants a divorce when Frank did not come home that night. Frank tells Sam that he actually locked himself out and stayed at the club. He tried calling Phyllis, but she would not answer the phone. Frank tells Sam a story about when he and Phyllis were younger and a special place they were at. Endora apologizes to Phyllis, but Phyllis says she hopes she and Frank will be happy together. Endora and Samantha use a little witchcraft to get them together at the place that Frank told Sam about. C. Lindsay Workman as train conductor. Note: Filmed December 10, 1964.
20	20	"Your Witch Is Showing"	Joseph Pevney	Joanna Lee	February 4, 1965
Samantha learns that her cousin Mario is getting married in Egypt and she is asked to be matron of honor. Darrin cannot get away from work and he does not want Sam to get there by using witchcraft. Endora, who is livid, states that Darrin is in "trouble". Darrin gets a new assistant named Gideon Whitsett (Jonathan Daly). Gideon wants to learn all he can from Darrin. They go to a meeting with Larry and new client Mr. Woolfe. Several things that make Mr. Woolfe like Gideon more than Darrin happen. When Darrin gets trapped in a stalled elevator, Gideon fills in at a cocktail meeting with Woolfe The next morning. Darrin is late to work because he ran out of gas. Gideon shows Woolfe some layouts that are like the ones which Darrin made. Darrin starts to believe that Gideon is a warlock who was sent by Endora. Sam tells Darrin that witchcraft is not behind every bad thing that happens to him. Endora tells Darrin that because he is family, she will help him. But things still do not go well when Darrin gives a presentation to Woolfe and others. Samantha uses a little magic to find out that Gideon is actually a conniving young man. Darrin wins the Woolfe account. Peggy Lipton makes a brief appearance as a secretary. Note: Filmed December 16, 1964.
21	21	"Ling Ling"	David McDearmon	Story by : Anthony Wilson; Teleplay by : Jerry Davis	February 11, 1965
Samantha finds a stray Siamese cat in the backyard. Darrin needs a new model for the "Jewel of the East" campaign, but time is running out. Sam turns the cat into an attractive Asian woman named Ling Ling (Greta Chi). Larry, Darrin and the agency's up and coming photographer, Wally Ames (Jeremy Slate), thinks she is perfect. Wally starts taking pictures. Ling Ling knows she is really a cat and sometimes acts like one. Wally is starting to fall for Ling Ling. Darrin invites Larry, Louise and Wally to the house that evening to celebrate. Wally brings Ling Ling. Ling-Ling likes the attention she is receiving from Wally as opposed to the life of a cat. Sam has a talk with Ling Ling and tells her she has to stop leading Wally on. Sam tells Darrin that Ling Ling is really a cat. Sam and Darrin now have to try to persuade Wally that Ling-Ling is not the right woman for him. Sam finds a way. Note: Filmed December 16, 1964.
22	22	"Eye of the Beholder"	William Asher	Herman Groves	February 25, 1965
Darrin, Samantha and Endora are browsing through an antiques store. Endora has Darrin see a 300-year-old painting, "Maid of Salem", which bears a striking resemblance to Samantha. She did this in the hope that Darrin will question how old Samantha really is. Back at home, Darrin puts the picture in a closet. He then asks Sam how old she is, but she does not say. Darrin thinks she will look exactly the same when he is 75. Darrin starts to feel old. At work, Larry can tell something is bothering Darrin when he talks about older men and younger women. Sam finds the picture in the closet and now knows why Darrin is acting the way he is. Sam tells Endora she will tell Darrin the truth. That night, Larry calls Sam and says that Darrin never came back to the office after lunch. He tells Sam that Darrin was acting strangely. A policeman calls Sam and says Darrin's car has been by the park for hours. Sam finds Darrin in the park. He says he loves her and it does not matter how old she is. Peter Brocco as Mr. Bodkin. Carter DeHaven as Henry. Georgia Schmidt as Agatha. Stephen Whittaker as Eddy. Note: Filmed January 11, 1965.
23	23	"Red Light, Green Light"	David McDearmon	Roland Wolpert	March 4, 1965
Samantha and Abner Kravitz cannot get across an intersection at Morning Glory Circle because of the constant traffic. They would like a traffic light put there. Several citizens hold a meeting about what to do. Sam suggests that they stage a protest rally at the school auditorium. Back at home, Sam finds Endora has put several traffic lights in her living room. Gladys sees them from outside and goes to get Abner. By the time they get back, the lights are gone. Darrin spends the night coming up with an advertisement poster for the rally. At the rally, the Mayor (Dan Tobin) does not think the intersection warrants a traffic light. Samantha uses some witchcraft to convince him otherwise. Vic Tayback as Mayor's Chauffeur. Robert Dornan as Policeman. Note: Filmed December 31, 1964.
24	24	"Which Witch Is Which?"	William D. Russell	Earl Barret	March 11, 1965
Samantha's going bargain shopping and invites Endora along. They're at the store and Sam realizes she will not have time to do the marketing. But Sam really wanted to try on some dresses. To assist her daughter in a dress fitting, Endora transforms herself into a double of Samantha. On the way to the fitting, Endora runs into Robert Frazer (Ron Randell), a young writer, who's there for a book signing. Bob becomes smitten with her. Bob happens to be an old friend of Darrin's and he gives Darrin a call. Darrin invites him to dinner. Meanwhile, Endora decides to cavort with Bob as Samantha. Gladys Kravitz sees the couple at a restaurant and thinks Samantha is having a secret affair. Endora and Bob spend a lot of time together. Things get awkward when Bob runs into the real Sam and tries to give her a kiss. Sam figures out what Endora did and confronts her about it. Bob comes to Darrin's house for dinner and tells him he thinks he is falling in love with Sam. Sam explains to Darrin what Endora did. Endora shows up (as Samantha) and Bob now believes Endora is Sam's twin. Donald Foster as Elderly Gentleman. Notes: Filmed January 18, 1965.; Remade in Season 6 as "A Chance on Love", broadcast March 19, 1970.
25	25	"Pleasure O'Riley"	William D. Russell	Ken Englund	March 18, 1965
Flirtatious Pleasure O'Riley (Kipp Hamilton) moves in next door to Darrin and Samantha. Darrin learns that Pleasure's real name is Priscilla and she is an ex-beauty queen. Darrin introduces Pleasure to Sam. That night, Sam is trying to have a romantic dinner with Darrin. There's a noise from next door and Darrin is worried something happened to Pleasure. He goes running over to her house. Pleasure is lying on the floor and Darrin leans over her to see if she is alright. Sam comes by and finds Darrin in that position and is not happy. During the night, Pleasure wakes Darrin up to tell him she is afraid. She found out that her incredibly jealous ex-boyfriend, pro football player 'Thunderbolt' Swenson (Ken Scott), found out where she lives. Thunderbolt arrives and things get a little confusing when he tries to find Pleasure. Thunderbolt winds up punching Abner Kravitz and a policeman arrests him. Despite a restraining order, Thunderbolt and Pleasure spend time together. Norman Burton as Moving Man. William Woodson as Police Sergeant. Note: Filmed January 25, 1965.
26	26	"Driving Is the Only Way to Fly"	William Asher	Richard Baer	March 25, 1965
Darrin agrees to teach Samantha how to drive. Sam is quite nervous and things do not go well. They get into an argument before they even start the car. The next day, Darrin gets Sam an appointment with a driving school. Darrin calls the owner, Basil Koenig (Paul Bryar), to confirm the time. Because all his other men are booked, Basil assigns his nervous brother-in-law Harold (Paul Lynde) to teach Sam. When he comes to pick up Sam, Harold tells her he has had 4 jobs in the last 4 months. They start the lesson and Harold is having a hard time instructing Sam. Sam has to use a little magic to help things along. Harold gets confused when Endora keeps popping in and out of the back seat. He thinks he is going crazy when the car disappears. Later, Sam and Darrin go to the driving school to see Harold. Harold tells them he has been fired. They talk Basil into keeping Harold on. Samantha gives Harold a little self confidence. Notes: Filmed February 5, 1965.; Lynde was cast as Uncle Arthur starting in Season 2.
27	27	"There's No Witch Like an Old Witch"	William Asher	Ted Sherdeman & Jane Klove	April 1, 1965
Fellow witch Bertha (Reta Shaw) tells Samantha that Aunt Clara sometimes gets depressed because her witchcraft is not what it used to be. Bertha asks Sam if she could help Clara get along without witchcraft. Later, Clara comes by and things do not go well when she tries some magic. Darrin and Sam take Clara to visit Tom and Beatrice Caldwell. Clara volunteers to babysit the Caldwell's son, Jimmy. Clara's magical tricks with toys and games make her a success, and she quickly becomes the most popular caretaker in the neighborhood. But after she tells the children that she is a witch, a suspicious mother brings her before a judge for a competency hearing. Sam and Darrin go with Clara to see Judge Virgil Winner. They find out it was Agnes Bain who filed the complaint. Clara admits to the Judge that she told the children she was a witch. The Judge is amused when Clara does some simple tricks. He asks if Clara could babysit for his son. Notes: Filmed February 12, 1965.; Reworked in Season 8 as "Samantha's Magic Sitter", broadcast January 5, 1972.
28	28	"Open the Door, Witchcraft"	William Asher	Ruth Brooks Flippen	April 8, 1965
Samantha uses her powers to open her garage door as Gladys is watching from across the street. Abner tells Gladys that Samantha probably has an electric garage door. Abner asks Darrin about the door and Darrin knows Sam was using magic. Darrin and Sam buy an electric garage door to avoid further suspicions from Gladys. Because of an installation problem, the door opens and closes due to radio waves from aircraft passing over their house. Sam notices the door open after she closed it. Endora comes by and Sam thinks she did it. Endora says it was not her. Sam tells Darrin about the problems with the door and she says they should return it. Darrin does not believe her and thinks witchcraft is involved. Things get tense between the two when they get stuck in the garage, but they make up. They have the door repaired. Baynes Barron as Max. Note: Filmed February 18, 1965.
29	29	"Abner Kadabra"	William Asher	Lawrence J. Cohen & Fred Freeman	April 15, 1965
Gladys catches Samantha using her magic to move some pictures around on the wall. Gladys thinks Sam is from another planet. The quick-thinking witch convinces the snoop that she possesses the gift of ESP. She was the one that caused the pictures to move. Some coincidental things happen and Gladys believes she has the power. Things take a turn for the worse when Gladys will not stop trying to use her new "talent" in every situation, which frustrates Abner. Sam tries to tell her that the powers do not always last. Abner tells Sam and Darrin that he and Gladys were at the market and she was talking to spirits. Sam tells Abner to bring Gladys by that evening. Samantha holds a seance to scare Gladys into giving up her thoughts of having powers. Gladys thinks she turned Abner into a pile of dust. Gladys swears she will never try to use her powers again. Notes: Filmed February 25, 1965.; Remade in Season 7 as "Samantha and the Antique Doll", broadcast April 22, 1971.
30	30	"George, the Warlock"	William Asher	Ken Englund	April 22, 1965
Neighbor Pleasure O'Riley is on her honeymoon. Her younger sister, Dora "D.D." Danger O'Riley (Beverly Adams), is watching the house. One morning, Darrin locks himself out of his house and then he meets Danger. They wind up having breakfast together. Samantha finds out and is not happy. Endora asks handsome warlock George (Christopher George) to woo Samantha in an attempt to break up her marriage to Darrin. A raven flies into Sam's window and then it changes into George. He tells Sam that he is there to rescue her from her dull mortal life. Sam says that she 's perfectly happy and George leaves as the raven. Outside, George sees Danger. Later, the raven George winds up at Darrin's office. Darrin and Larry want to use the raven in an ad campaign. Darrin brings the bird home and Sam shows him it is George, whom she used to date. Danger comes by and asks Darrin's to help her use her oven. George volunteers to help her. Darrin thinks that Danger should be told what George is. George tells Danger that he is a warlock and he does some magic for her. George and Danger tell Darrin and Sam that they have found each other. Note: Filmed March 4, 1965.
31	31	"That Was My Wife"	William Asher	Bernard Slade	April 29, 1965
After hearing a radio commercial for hair dye, Samantha first changes her hair to red and then brunette. Gladys comes by and Sam tells her she is wearing a wig. Samantha and Darrin spend the night at a hotel and Sam still has her hair brunette. Larry spots them and thinks Darrin is having an affair. Darrin left a book he was reading back at home and Sam goes to get it. Larry comes by the house claiming to be looking for Louise and Sam is there with her blonde hair. Meanwhile, Gladys puts on a blonde wig and Abner does not even notice. Larry comes by the hotel room and tells Darrin he saw the brunette and Sam at home. Larry reluctantly tells Louise about Darrin. Louise meets with Darrin at a hotel hoping to convince him to drop the other woman. Larry spots them and thinks Darrin's other woman is Louise. Gladys confronts Abner and he says that he did not notice the blonde wig because he is color blind. At the office, Larry punches Darrin in the eye and tells him to stay away from Louise. Sam finds a way to straighten everything out and get Larry and Louise together. Note: Filmed March 15, 1965.
32	32	"Illegal Separation"	William Asher	Richard Baer	May 6, 1965
Samantha and Darrin were hoping to have a quiet romantic evening when the doorbell rings. It is Abner and he says that he and Gladys had a big fight. When Abner says he has been locked out of the house, Sam offers to let him stay the night. The next morning, Gladys comes by. But instead of wanting Abner back, she brings a suitcase of his clothes. Gladys says that she and Abner are through. Abner does not seem concerned when he hears what Gladys said. Sam goes to see Gladys and she does wants Abner back but will not ask him. Sam's first plan to get them together does not work. Abner is starting to wear out his welcome. Sam decides to reunite the couple by having them simultaneously dream of the day Abner proposed. The couple dream they are college students and are in a malt shop. Abner says he loves her and asks her to marry him. Sam wakes them up and they run into each others arms outside. Sam and Darrin again try to have a romantic night. Gladys and Abner come by to thank them and wind up staying. Notes: Filmed March 19, 1965.; In the episode's dream sequence, Gladys's maiden name is revealed to be Gruber.
33	33	"A Change of Face"	William Asher	Bernard Slade	May 13, 1965
Endora decides to experiment with a different look to Darrin's face while he is taking a nap. Sam needs to do something in the kitchen and Endora leaves without changing him back. The doorbell rings and wakes Darrin up. He answers the door and it is Gladys. She screams when she sees his changed face. After Sam changes him back, Darrin is upset with her. He becomes self-conscious about the way he looks. Darrin talks to a Doctor (Henry Hunter) about his face being changed. The Doctor recommends a psychiatrist. Samantha disguises herself as sexy French sculptor Michelle (Marilyn Hanold) to help repair Darrin's tattered ego. Endora worries that Darrin may fall for Michelle. Michelle runs into Darrin in a bar and starts to compliment his face. Darrin turns down her advances. During dinner, Sam asks Darrin about his day. He does not mention Michelle, because he suspects she was Sam. Barbara Lucas is filling in for Darrin's secretary. He thinks it is Sam again and gives her a kiss. Just then Sam comes in. Everything does get straightened out. Dick Wilson as Man in Bar. Note: Filmed March 25, 1965.
34	34	"Remember the Main"	William D. Russell	Mort R. Lewis	May 20, 1965
Samantha volunteered to work on the election campaign of Ed Wright (Edward Mallory). He is running for Morning Glory Circle councilor against long time incumbent John C. Cavanaugh (Byron Morrow). Sam holds a last minute rally at her house. Wright wants to expose Cavanaugh's immoral and illegal dealings in past capital works projects. Darrin comes up with some slogans for Wright and becomes his campaign manager. Wright thinks there's some corruption in the current water works project and wants the Governor to investigate. Cavanaugh declines Wrights requests for a televised debate. Wright is on TV when Cavanaugh suddenly shows up. Cavanaugh brings with him Merrill Sedgwick from the Governor's investigation staff. Sedgwick clears Cavanaugh of any wrongdoing in the water works project. Sam and Endora believe there was still past corruption and find proof. Endora causes a water main to burst and it is flooding much of the neighborhood. Darrin thinks Sam is behind it until Endora admits to it. Darrin gets a call and learns that Sedgwick was wrong and they will look into all of Cavanaugh's past dealings. Wright wins the election and it seems Cavanaugh has left the country. Stuart Nisbet as Charles Turner. Note: Filmed February 1, 1965.
35	35	"Eat at Mario's"	William Asher	Richard Baer	May 27, 1965
Samantha and Endora are eating at Mario's (Vito Scotti), a small, independent Italian restaurant. Endora believes it is the best Italian food they've ever eaten this century. The problem is that Mario's little one man operation is not getting many customers. Sam wants to ask Darrin's advice about advertising for Mario. Darrin tells Sam his new client is Linton H. Baldwin (Alan Hewitt). His is the owner of Perfect Pizza, a chain looking to expand its market. Baldwin has dropped several different agencies lately. Darrin shows Sam a newspaper ad he wants to use for Baldwin. Samantha, using witchcraft, decides to provide some advertising for Mario's. Darrin sees Mario's ad in the paper. Baldwin wants to know why Mario's got a full page ad and he only got a quarter page ad. Sam and Endora are watching a TV commercial for Perfect Pizza. Endora uses witchcraft to make the announcer also mention Mario's. Baldwin pulls his account from Darrin's firm to go with Samantha's supposed agency. Sam and Endora figure out a way to help Mario and save Darrin's career by Baldwin keeping his account at McMann & Tate. Phil Arnold as Ice Cream Vendor. Pamelyn Ferdin as Young Girl at Vending Cart. Billy Beck as Balloon vendor. Note: Filmed April 1, 1965.
36	36	"Cousin Edgar"	E. W. Swackhamer	Story by : John L. Greene & Paul David; Teleplay by : Paul Wayne	June 3, 1965
During the night, Samantha gets a brief visit from her distant cousin Edgar (Arte Johnson). He is an elf who has the power to become invisible. Darrin has a big meeting for the lucrative Shelley Shoes account and he has no ideas. His morning is not going well as everything seems to be going wrong. At the office, Darrin is talking to Larry and a couple of things happen to Darrin. He thinks Endora is behind it and calls Sam. Sam talks to Endora and Sam mentions seeing Edgar. Endora tells her that Edgar feels their marriage is not the right thing for Samantha. Larry and Darrin are waiting for Mr. Shelly to arrive. Shelly also invited Fred Froug (Roy Stuart) from a competing ad agency. Shelly arrives and Darrin again looks like a clumsy fool. At home, Darrin tries to tell Sam what happened, but she keeps falling asleep. Later, Sam tells Darrin the things that are happening to him are caused by Edgar. Sam convinces Edgar that she loves Darrin and he is the best thing that has ever happened to her. At the next meeting with Mr. Shelly, bad things happen to Fred Froug. Darrin winds up winning the account. Note: Filmed April 8, 1965.

=== Season 2 (1965–66) ===
Episodes were originally filmed in black-and-white, but were later colorized.

No. overall	No. in season	Title	Directed by	Written by	Original release date
37	1	"Alias Darrin Stephens"	William Asher	Richard Baer	September 16, 1965
It is Samantha and Darrin's first wedding anniversary and they are about to go out. Aunt Clara drops by unexpectedly with anniversary gifts. When trying to change the size of a golf cap she gave him, Aunt Clara accidentally turns Darrin into a chimpanzee. She cannot remember how to reverse the spell. The next day, Sam has to call Larry and tell him Darrin will not be at work. Darrin cannot speak, but he can write things down. Sam asks Endora to watch Darrin because she has to go out. Larry comes by and Darrin jumps out the window. Gladys Kravitz finds him and brings him home. Sam comes home and finds Aunt Clara there but no Endora or Darrin. Sam says they have to find Darrin because she wants to tell him she is pregnant. Darrin winds up in a cage at the zoo. Sam learns Darrin's at the zoo and goes there. Aunt Clara shows up with the spell to change him back, which they do. The Zoo Keeper lets Darrin out of the cage. Darrin is very upset. His mood quickly changes when Sam tells him the good news. Notes: Filmed May 20, 1965.; This is the first episode featuring the 1965-era Screen Gems title sequence at the end of broadcast. In later syndication, the logo may be replaced by current-era Sony Pictures Television animated sequences.
38	2	"A Very Special Delivery"	William Asher	Howard Leeds	September 23, 1965
Darrin is determined to make sure that Samantha does not strain herself during her pregnancy, and so he waits on her hand and foot. When Larry convinces him that strenuous work is actually good for a pregnant woman, Darrin changes his tune and starts ignoring Samantha's needs. A furious Endora decides to teach Darrin an unforgettable lesson by making him undergo the symptoms of a pregnancy himself. At the office, Darrin gets emotional in front of Larry and starts crying. During a meeting with potential client Mr. Martin, Darrin gets into an argument with him over a pickle. Darrin goes to see a Doctor (Henry Hunter). After Darrin describes his symptoms, the Doctor says that if he were a woman he would probably be pregnant. Darrin now believes Endora put a spell on him. Endora tells Sam she will not take the spell off Darrin just yet. Darrin daydreams about being the first man to have a baby and he is being interviewed by reporters. Endora takes the spell off Darrin and he starts to pamper Sam again. Note: Filmed May 26, 1965.
39	3	"We're in for a Bad Spell"	Howard Morris	Bernard Slade	September 30, 1965
Adam Newlarkin (William Redfield), an old Army friend of Darrin, is staying with Darrin and Samantha for a couple days. He just came to town and is looking for a job. Sam learns that his family is from Salem. Some strange things start happening to him while at the house. Sam and Aunt Clara find out that Adam is a descendant of a Salem witch trial judge and he has a spell on him. Sam tells Darrin that by 5pm the next day, Adam will steal a large sum of money and be branded a criminal. Adam says that he got a job as an accountant at a bank. Aunt Clara finds that Adam has to do three unusual tasks within 12 hours to remove the spell. The next morning, they get Adam to kiss a spotted dog. At lunch, Darrin and Clara manage to have Adam fall into a pool three times. Sam and Darrin explain to Adam about the spell on him and he does believe them. Adam does do the elaborate third task in time and the spell is removed. Richard X. Slattery as Detective Pearson. Bartlett Robinson as Mr. Abercrombie, the bank manager. Arthur Peterson as Albert Harding. Note: Filmed June 4, 1965.
40	4	"My Grandson, the Warlock"	E. W. Swackhamer	Ted Sherdeman & Jane Klove	October 7, 1965
Larry calls from London and asks Darrin and Samantha to take care of their baby Jonathan until they get back. Their Governess has taken ill. Gladys sees Darrin and Sam race off in their car and then come back later with a baby. Gladys mentions the baby to Sam's father Maurice (Maurice Evans), who just stopped by. When Maurice asks Sam about how she will train the baby in witchcraft, she says she was not going to. Without Sam knowing it, Maurice takes the baby to the London Warlocks' Club to begin his training. Louise sees Maurice walking down the street with the baby and recognizes it as Jonathan. Larry says that's impossible. Samantha and Endora try to track down Maurice and the baby. Darrin has to stall Larry and Louise, who have just returned from London and are anxious to see their son. Meanwhile, Maurice becomes frustrated as "his" grandson shows no signs of having powers, especially as he shows off the baby to his friends. Nanny Witch (Winnie Coffin) tells Maurice that the baby is a mortal. Darrin is still stalling for time and is able to mention to Sam that Louise thinks she saw the baby in London. Darrin, Larry and Louise finally get to the house and Sam finds Maurice upstairs with the baby. Sam tells Maurice that the baby is not hers. Notes: Filmed July 1, 1965.; Elizabeth Montgomery gave birth to her son, Robert, on October 5, 1965. Filming had continued through the summer of 1965 in anticipation of this event.
41	5	"The Joker Is a Card"	E. W. Swackhamer	Ron Friedman	October 14, 1965
Samantha's attempt to eat a peaceful dinner with Darrin and Endora is ruined by practical jokes. The witches realize that Sam's prank-loving Uncle Arthur (Paul Lynde) has come for a visit. Sam tells Darrin that Arthur is the black sheep of the family, but he is her favorite uncle. Arthur takes a liking to Darrin and offers to teach him a spell that will give Endora a taste of her own medicine. At first Darrin turns Arthur down. Darrin is persuaded when it seems like Endora is causing trouble in the workplace. But Arthur's hex turns out to be a hoax on him and Darrin just looks foolish. Darrin, Samantha, and Endora decide to work together to give Uncle Arthur a taste of his own medicine. Arthur's pledge of no more pranks does not last long. Douglas Evans as Mr. Foster. Notes: Filmed July 16, 1965.; First of 10 appearances of Paul Lynde as Uncle Arthur.
42	6	"Take Two Aspirin and Half a Pint of Porpoise Milk"	William Asher	Bernard Slade	October 21, 1965
Mr. Norton, Darrin's new client, is showing Darrin and Samantha his greenhouse. Norton shows him his prized possession, black Peruvian roses. Sam starts to get dizzy and light headed. Darrin gets Sam home and she starts to lose her powers. Gladys comes by with some soup. Sam starts getting green squares all over her face and Gladys runs off. Aunt Clara comes by and figures out it was exposure to the Peruvian black rose. Darrin is concerned because Sam is pregnant. Aunt Clara sends Darrin off to gather items for the antidote that she will brew. These include ingredients such as bat wings, porpoise milk, eye of newt and an ostrich feather. Darrin goes to see Mr. Trigby (Philip Coolidge), who runs a witches drug store. Trigby has everything but the feather. Darrin gets arrested when he tries to take an ostrich feather from the hat of a woman on the street (Maudie Prickett). Darrin tells the Police Sergeant (Larry D. Mann) that he offered to buy the feather. The Sergeant lets Darrin go. Aunt Clara conjures up an ostrich and is able to make the antidote. But she forgot she also needs some petals from the rose. Darrin gets caught by Norton and winds up in jail. Aunt Clara switches places with Darrin and he puts the petals in the potion. Sam gets better and sends Darrin back. Things get straightened out with Mr. Norton. Notes: Filmed August 12, 1965; First supernatural illness episode.; Remade in Season 8 as "Samantha's Witchcraft Blows a Fuse".
43	7	"Trick or Treat"	E. W. Swackhamer	Lawrence J. Cohen & Fred Freeman	October 28, 1965
Endora wants Samantha to go away with her to hide from traditional Halloween. Sam tells Endora she cannot go as they are hosting the Tate's and a potential new client that evening. Sam is surprised when a package arrives that contains several Halloween decorations. Sam calls Darrin and Darrin finds out that Larry sent the package. Turns out that client Jack Rogers' (Jack Collins) company makes Halloween props. Endora goes to Darrin's office and insists that Sam be allowed to go away with her. Darrin refuses. That evening, Endora frightens some trick or treaters outside Sam's house. Seeking revenge, Endora turns herself into a little girl trick or treater (Maureen McCormick). She puts a spell on Darrin that slowly turns him into a werewolf. Sam finds little Endora and puts her into a room until she takes the spell off. The Tate's and Jack and Phyllis Rogers arrive. Darrin has to keep running off to shave the hair off his face and hands. He now is growing claws and fangs. Larry and Jack see Darrin completely transformed. Jack thinks Darrin did this to impress him and he loves it. Endora apologizes to Sam and takes the spell off Darrin. Note: Filmed July 29, 1965.
44	8	"The Very Informal Dress"	William Asher	Paul David & John L. Greene	November 4, 1965
Darrin tells Samantha that they have to go to a last minute cocktail party for prospective client Charles Barlow (Max Showalter). Barlow's company makes the "Mother Jenny" line of not very good tasting health food products. Sam says that she has nothing to wear. Aunt Clara overhears this and conjures up a pretty outfit for Sam. She then gives Darrin a new suit. Sam invites Aunt Clara to go with them. A policeman gets confused when Aunt Clara moves a fire hydrant so Darrin can park his car. Sam's clothing begins to vanish soon after their arrival. She conjures up a different outfit which confuses Barlow. Darrin is about to drive Barlow to his hotel, when his clothes start to vanish, leaving him in his underwear. This ultimately gets Darrin into a bit of trouble with the police. Darrin is put in a jail cell with a drunk named Montague (Dick Wilson). Aunt Clara tries to clothe Darrin and he winds up in various medieval outfits. Thanks to Aunt Clara, Sam and Montague, Darrin manages to beat the rap. Larry tells Darrin and Sam that he is no longer interested in the Barlow account. Hardie Albright as Judge Crosetti. Note: Filmed June 14, 1965.
45	9	"And Then I Wrote"	E. W. Swackhamer	Paul Wayne	November 11, 1965
Doctor Passmore (Olan Soule) comes by hoping to have Darrin do some advertising for the American Civil War's centennial pageant. Without consulting Darrin, Samantha says he would be happy to do it. Darrin tells Sam he is too busy, but reluctantly agrees to help. When Darrin speaks to Passmore, he suggests that Sam write the script to the pageant. Despite having some knowledge about it, Sam is having writer's block. Endora suggests that she materialize the characters in front of her so that she can get a better idea of what to write. Sam materializes Confederate Captain Corcoran, his love interest Violet (Eileen O'Neill), and an Indian (Tom Nardini). The problem is that Gladys sees some of this. Another problem is the characters now materialize whenever Samantha thinks about them. Abner sends Gladys to see Doctor Passmore, as he is a psychiatrist. Darrin and Sam show Passmore some of the posters Darrin came up with. Sam's characters show up and Passmore thinks he is seeing things. Samantha has to figure out a way to make her vivid imagination not so vivid. She gets some help from her characters. Note: Filmed July 21, 1965.
46	10	"Junior Executive"	Howard Morris	Bernard Slade	November 18, 1965
Samantha wonders what Darrin looked liked as a child. Endora changes him into his ten year old self (Billy Mumy). After he is changed back, Darrin is furious. Because of some nasty things Darrin says about Endora, she changes him back into a boy right before meeting Mr. Harding, a toy maker. Darrin calls Sam and she manages to change him back. Larry tells Darrin that Harding is convinced that the young Darrin is actually an advertising prodigy and want to set up a meeting between the "new kid" and Darrin himself. The next day, Sam turns Darrin into the little boy and he heads to the office. On the way, he runs into two other boys and they tell him why the toys are no good. Young Darrin meets up with Larry and Harding, but they want Darrin there. Sam and Darrin figure out a way for Larry and Harding to not want the kid around. Sam and Darrin show their appreciation for the boys suggestions and give them presents. Note: Filmed June 18, 1965.
47	11	"Aunt Clara's Old Flame"	E. W. Swackhamer	Bernard Slade	November 25, 1965
Aunt Clara comes by and wants to hide there because Hedley Partridge (Charlie Ruggles) is back in town. Samantha learns that Hedley is an old boyfriend. Aunt Clara fears that he will discover her powers have dimmed with age. She would like Hedley to remember her as she was. Endora tells Sam that she invited Hedley over for dinner. Hedley arrives early and thinks Gladys is Sam. He does some magic in front of her and she runs off screaming. Darrin, Sam and Aunt Clara arrive. Hedley seems as virile and adept in his powers as he was when he was younger. He mentions another witch he saw recently and says she had lost most of her powers. In order to help Aunt Clara, Samantha performs whatever witchcraft Hedley asks of her. Aunt Clara thinks she is doing the magic. She tries some more and it does not go well. Abner and Gladys come by and Darrin has to explain why there is a baby elephant in the room. Sam turns Hedley back. Hedley confesses that his powers are fading as much as Clara's are. Notes: Filmed August 4, 1965.; Remade in Season 7 as "Samantha's Magic Mirror".
48	12	"A Strange Little Visitor"	E. W. Swackhamer	John L. Greene & Paul David	December 2, 1965
Walter (James Doohan) and Margaret Brocken (Anne Sargent) come by Samantha's house with their son Merle (Craig Hundley). The Brocken's are witches and were hoping Sam could take care of Merle overnight. Sam agrees as long as Merle promises to not do any magic in front of Darrin. Meanwhile, Darrin and Larry are in a bar. Larry shows Darrin an expensive necklace that he got for Louise's birthday. Larry asks Darrin to keep it till tomorrow. A man (Tim Herbert) sitting next to them sees and hears the whole thing. The man follows Darrin home. Darrin meets Merle and thinks he is a kid from the neighborhood. Darrin finds out Merle is a warlock when he tries to take a toy fire engine from him and is electrocuted. Sam again makes Merle promise no more witchcraft. That night the man comes to Darrin's house and gets in. Darrin confronts the man who has a gun. Darrin gets tied up. Merle comes by and Darrin wants him to use some magic, but he does not because he promised. Merle is then tied up. The man finds the necklace and is about to take Merle's fire truck. With the help of Merle and the truck, the man is caught by the police. Note: Filmed July 8, 1965.
49	13	"My Boss, the Teddy Bear"	William Asher	Bernard Slade	December 9, 1965
Darrin is having trouble coming up with ideas for a presentation he is to give that day. Endora wants Samantha to attend a family wedding. She would like Darrin to take some time off so he can travel with her. Darrin does not think Larry would let him go. Endora says she could turn Larry into an inanimate object and he would never know Darrin was gone. Endora runs into Larry at a toy store. He is there looking for a replacement teddy bear for his son. Endora asks him if he could spare Darrin for a couple days and Larry wholeheartedly agrees. To thank Larry, Endora conjures up the exact bear Larry was looking for and leaves it with Betty the secretary. Darrin mistakenly believes that Endora has transformed Larry into the bear. Potential client Mr. Harper (Jack Collins) comes by with his assistant Ted Bertram (Henry Hunter). They are surprised when they see Darrin talking to the bear. Louise comes by and Betty gives her the bear. Because Louise had also bought the exact bear, she will return this one to the store. Sam meets Darrin at the toy store. There are a large amount of the bears and they bring all of them home. They think they've figured out which one is Larry and Endora shows up. Darrin yells at Endora and she destroys the bear. Louise comes by and Darrin is about to tell her about the bear being Larry, when Larry walks in. Darrin will use all the other bears for the Harper's honey campaign. Note: Filmed September 10, 1965.
50	14	"Speak the Truth"	William Asher	Paul David & John L. Greene	December 16, 1965
Samantha oversleeps and looks a bit disheveled. Darrin tells her she looks beautiful. He reminds her they are having a dinner party for the Tates and Ed (Charles Lane) and Frances (Elisabeth Fraser) Hotchkiss, potential new clients. After Darrin leaves, Endora comes by. She says that Darrin was not telling the truth and was just being polite. Endora leaves on Darrin's desk a statue that causes any mortal within three feet to tell the truth. This causes some awkward moments for Darrin with his work colleagues and clients. Darrin brings the statue home and winds up saying some offending things to Sam. Sam invites Endora to the dinner. That night, everyone starts telling the truth and things get a little tense. The next morning Sam figures out that the statue was the cause. Larry comes by and says that they all learned that the truth may not always be a bad thing. Larry and Darrin do get the Hotchkiss account. Mort Mills as Policeman. Notes: Filmed August 27, 1965.; Remade in Season 8 as the series finale, "The Truth, Nothing But the Truth, So Help Me, Sam".
51	15	"A Vision of Sugar Plums"	Alan Rafkin	Herman Groves	December 23, 1965
Samantha and Darrin get a card from the boy (Billy Mumy) they took in last year for Christmas and have an episode-long flashback of the previous year's holiday episode. Note: A near-repeat of the 15th episode of season 1, "A Vision of Sugar Plums". The cold open is identical. There is one new scene, after the opening credits, in which Sam and Darrin open and read Michael's card, which leads into the flashback. Two short early sequences with the Kravitzes (which did not feature either Samantha or Darrin) have been removed—the rest of the episode is identical to the original.
52	16	"The Magic Cabin"	William Asher	Paul Wayne	December 30, 1965
Darrin has hit a creative dry spell. Larry suggests that he take some time off with Samantha and go to his secluded cabin in the woods. Larry says it is actually up for sale, but he has not been up to see it in three years. When Sam and Darrin get to the cabin, they see how completely run down it is. It starts to storm outside and rain is leaking in from the roof. At first Darrin is against witchcraft, but then he lets Sam twitch it up to look wonderful. Newlyweds Alice and Charles MacBain (Peter Duryea) go to see Larry about his ad for the cabin. Larry says some friends of his are staying there, but that should not be a problem. Sam and Darrin go out for a while. The young couple come by the cabin and fall in love with the fixed up version. They telephone Larry to tell him they want to buy it at his asking price. Sam and Darrin come back and Alice tells them they just bought the place. Sam talks Darrin into leaving the cabin as it is. Just as Sam and Darrin are about to leave, Larry shows up and Sam changes it back. Things get complicated when the MacBain's show up. Sam finds a way for the couple to get their beautiful cabin, Larry does not know about the change and Larry charges them less money. A situation comes up where Darrin wants Sam to use her magic. Note: Filmed August 19, 1965.
53	17	"Maid to Order"	William Asher	Richard Baer	January 6, 1966
Darrin decides that Samantha needs help around the house and insists that she hire a maid. Sam chooses Naomi Hogan (Alice Ghostley), a well-meaning but incredibly clumsy woman who desperately needs to pay for her son's medical schooling. Larry and Louise come over and things are not going well with Naomi's cooking. Naomi gets some magical help from Samantha to boost her confidence. Louise calls Darrin and asks to borrow Naomi to cook for a dinner party she is throwing for an important client that evening. Their regular maid, Esmeralda, was called out of town. Sam tells Darrin that she has been helping Naomi. They need to find a way to be invited to Louise's party so Sam can continue to help Naomi. Sam and Darrin go to the Tate's house that evening, but Larry will not let them in. Sam pops back and forth between her house and Larry's to help Naomi. The next morning Sam and Darrin try to decide how to let Naomi go. Naomi saves them the trouble be quitting. They find out she has a great mind for figures. Darrin believes he can get her a job in accounting at his office. Elvia Allman as Mrs. Luftwaffe. Notes: Filmed September 2, 1965.; The Tates refer to their absent maid "Esmeralda", which would become the name of the witch-maid Alice Ghostley was cast to play in Season 6.; Remade in Season 5 as "Samantha's Super Maid".
54	18	"...And Then There Were Three"	William Asher	Bernard Slade	January 13, 1966
Samantha and Darrin are leaving for the hospital. Sam gets a call from her cousin Serena, who says she may come by the hospital. At the hospital, Endora pops into the waiting room from the delivery room to tell Darrin she has a granddaughter. Darrin goes to Sam's room and Nurse Kelton (Eve Arden) tells them she will get their daughter. Sam tells Darrin that Endora suggested the name Tabatha. Nurse Kelton kicks Darrin out. Endora pops into the room and fills it with flowers. Nurse Kelton comes back and wonders how the flowers got there. Later, Serena comes by and the two realize they've grown up to be look-alikes. Serena fills the room with flowers and tells Sam she turned Kelton into a frog. Serena brings Kelton back and she sees all the flowers again. Serena makes the flowers disappear in front of Kelton. Kelton thinks she is seeing things. However, the fun really begins when Darrin meets Serena. Unfortunately, Darrin thinks Endora cast a spell on his daughter to cause her to age overnight. He tries to catch Serena, who he thinks is a now adult Tabatha. Things continue to get confusing for Kelton. Eventually, all problems are solved, and Darrin and Samantha accept Tabatha as their daughter's name. Judy Pace as Nurse. Joseph Mell as Manager. Celeste Yarnall as Student Nurse. Notes: Filmed December 10, 1965.; The baby's name was spelled "Tabatha" until Season 5 when Elizabeth Montgomery's desire to have it spelled "Tabitha" was fulfilled.; This episode marks the first appearance of the character of Serena.
55	19	"My Baby, the Tycoon"	William Asher	Richard Baer	January 20, 1966
Samantha is very sleepy from being up with Tabatha during the night. When Sam uses magic to give Tabatha a bottle, Darrin sees it and thinks Tabatha did it. Gladys and Abner give Tabatha a share of stock as a gift. The next day the stock, which has not moved in 20 years, increases by 6 points, almost doubling its worth. Darrin asks Sam if she or Endora had something to do with it. Darrin then suspects Tabatha magically influenced the stock's value. As an experiment, Darrin lets Tabatha point to a stock in the paper. He then buys a share of the company the next day. The stock also nearly doubles its worth overnight. Gladys' stockbroker cousin, Julius Cushman, calls her up. He thinks that Darrin must have an inside source of information about stocks. Gladys and Abner go to see Sam and the baby. Gladys believes that Tabatha made the stock go up with voodoo. Tabatha points to another stock when Gladys holds the paper by her. Gladys and Abner lose a lot of money after the stock Gladys bought goes down. Abner tells Darrin that Gladys bought the stock because Tabatha picked it. Darrin hears from Julius that Gladys' stock went back up. In the end, Darrin finds out that there were legitimate reasons for the stocks rising. William Kendis as Stock Broker. Note: Filmed December 15, 1965.
56	20	"Samantha Meets the Folks"	William Asher	Bernard Slade	January 27, 1966
Tabatha receives her first letter from Darrin's parents Phyllis and Frank, and Samantha and Darrin recall their first visit in an episode-long flashback. Notes: A near-repeat of the 14th episode of season 1, "Samantha Meets the Folks". The first 38 seconds of this episode consists of Darrin and Samantha reading and commenting on the letter, which then transitions into the flashback of the earlier episode (less the original episode's first 38 seconds, which showed Samantha cleaning the house as Aunt Clara arrived). Apart from replacing those 38 seconds, the episode is identical to the earlier one.; The letter mentions that Phyllis and Frank will be visiting Samantha, Darrin and Tabatha in two weeks' time. In the episode that aired exactly two weeks after this one, Phyllis and Frank did indeed come by to visit.
57	21	"Fastest Gun on Madison Avenue"	William Asher	Lee Erwin	February 3, 1966
While Samantha waits for Darrin alone in a fancy restaurant, she is hit upon by an obnoxious drunk. Darrin arrives and the drunk makes fun of him. The drunk grabs Darrin and one thing leads to another and the drunk is knocked out with some magical help from Sam. The next morning, Sam sees on the front page of the paper that the drunk was heavyweight contender 'Jolting Joe' Kovacks. Darrin's picture is there as well. Darrin is a little upset that Sam did not let him fight his own battle. Darrin then sees the paper. When Darrin gets to the office, Kovacks and his Manager (Herbie Faye) are there. The Manager wants to set up a meeting at the restaurant where Kovacks will apologize. Darrin is to turn down the apology and when Kovacks lightly hits him, Darrin is to take a dive. That way, Kovacks will save face and still be considered a contender. Because of something Gladys says, Sam goes to the restaurant. She does not know the plan and Darrin winds up knocking Kovacks out again. Darrin goes to a bar and is confronted by a man who wants Darrin to take a swing at him. Darrin stumbles into him and knocks him out. Sam the Bartender (Herb Vigran) tells Darrin the man is Tommy Carter (Rockne Tarkington), the Champ. Darrin thinks Sam the Bartender is Samantha. Larry tells Darrin he set up a rematch with Carter for the Advertising Club's Charity ball. Dick Wilson as Drunk. Note: Filmed December 21, 1965.
58	22	"The Dancing Bear"	William Asher	James S. Henerson	February 10, 1966
Darrin's parents, Frank and Phyllis, are coming by to see Tabatha for the first time. Darrin is a little wary when he finds Endora will be joining them. Endora brought Tabatha a teddy bear. Frank and Phyllis arrive and Frank tells Darrin about a business venture he is interested in. Darrin wonders why Frank, who just retired, would want to start something else. Turns out that Phyllis brought the same teddy bear for Tabatha. Endora gets the upper hand when she places a spell on her bear, which dances every time anyone says the name Tabatha. Frank sees the dancing bear and Darrin claims that he tinkered with it. Frank sees the dancing bear as a business opportunity that could reap him and Darrin millions. The next day, Frank calls and says he is bringing over a toy manufacturer. Sam is able to convince Endora to take the spell off the bear. When Endora sees that Phyllis brought a clown doll over, she puts the spell back on the bear. Frank comes by with Mr. Hockstedder (Arthur Julian), the toy manufacturer. Darrin tells them the bear does not work anymore. But when Darrin brings the bear over and says Tabatha, the bear starts dancing. Hockstedder wants to mass produce the bear. With the help of Phyllis and Endora, Sam finds a way to cancel the deal. Note: Filmed December 29, 1965.
59	23	"Double Tate"	William Asher	Paul Wayne	February 17, 1966
Endora gives Darrin three wishes for his birthday, without telling him. Darrin quickly uses two wishes on little things without even knowing it. Larry calls Darrin and tells him he is stuck at a fogged-in Chicago airport. Darrin tells him that Randolph Turgeon is in Larry's office waiting to renew a contract. Larry tells him to think of something to stall Turgeon. Darrin wishes he were Larry for a day and turns into a double of his boss. Darrin is stunned when he realizes what happened. He tries to call Samantha, but Turgeon walks in. Things get confusing during their conversation as Darrin really does not know much about Turgeon. At a restaurant, Randolph introduces his niece Joyce to Darrin. Randolph hopes that Darrin can find a place for her at his agency. Problems arise when Louise shows up and sees Darrin with Joyce. At the Tate house, Darrin calls Sam and tries to tell her he is being turned into Larry. Sam learns from Endora about the wishes. Sam goes to the Tate home and Louise would like to get rid of her. Sam figures out that Darrin will change back at midnight, which is not long. The real Larry comes home and Louise is very confused. Sam finds a way to stall for time and explain things to Larry and Louise when Darrin changes back.. Notes: Filmed January 3, 1966.; Partly remade in Season 3 as "Three Wishes".
60	24	"Samantha, the Dressmaker"	William Asher	Lee Erwin	February 24, 1966
Samantha is trying to design and sew an evening gown for a business dinner she and Darrin are going to with important clients, Doris and J.T. Glendon (Harry Holcombe). It is not going well. Sam agrees to go to lunch with Endora, but is not happy when they wind up in Paris. Endora convinces Sam to go see fashion designer Aubert (Dick Gautier) to maybe get some inspiration. They are told that Aubert is not seeing anyone now. Using magic, Sam and Endora get a sneak peek at some of his yet to be unveiled fashions. After a comment Darrin makes about the dress Sam was working on, she uses her magic to recreate one of Aubert's for herself. Two ladies from the dinner ask Sam to make dresses for them. Wanting to impress Glendon, Darrin says Sam would be happy to do it. At the house, Sam takes measurements of Doris, Ethel and Gladys Kravitz. Darrin calls and tells Sam that the ladies are invited to a cocktail party this Friday, but he will not say for who. Gladys invites herself. Aubert turns out to be one of Darrin's clients. At the cocktail party, Aubert faints when he sees Sam and her friends in his creations. Later, Darrin says that Aubert will sue the agency for stealing his designs. Sam figures out a way to get Aubert to not sue the agency and also helps him to mass market his dresses to average Americans. Notes: Filmed January 10, 1966.; This was actress Alice Pearce's penultimate performance as Gladys Kravitz.
61	25	"The Horse's Mouth"	William Asher	Paul David & John L. Greene	March 3, 1966
Samantha finds a horse in her backyard. She turns the horse into an attractive woman (Patty Regan) to find out where she came from. In her human form, the horse tells Sam that her name is Dally Ran and that she is a race horse. Dally left because she is always used to set a race up for her sister, Adorable Diane, to win. Jack Spindler (Sidney Clute), Dally's trainer, comes by asking if they've seen a horse. Darrin brings home his old friend Gus Walters (Robert Sorrells) for dinner. Sam introduces Dally as old friend Dolly. Gus is having trouble raising money for his new business venture. Dolly suggests Gus raise the money by betting on the horses. Dolly claims to have inside knowledge about the horses. Gus likes the idea. Darrin finds out that Dolly is a horse. At the track, Dolly learns that Dally Ran is still listed for a race. Dolly recommends a long shot horse to Gus and it wins. But the next horse Dolly picks loses. Dolly and Sam learn from Jack that he had to scratch Adorable Diane. He wishes Dally Ran were around. Sam talks Dolly into changing back to Dally Ran so she could have one last chance at glory. It takes some doing, but Darrin talks Gus into betting on Dally. Dally wins and Gus makes a lot of money. Jack tells them that he will never hold Dally back again. Note: Filmed January 17, 1966.
62	26	"Baby's First Paragraph"	William Asher	James S. Henerson	March 10, 1966
Samantha has an appointment she has to go to. When her babysitter cancels on her and she cannot find another, Sam reluctantly allows Endora to do it. Gladys comes by with her baby nephew Edgar, who is the same age as Tabatha. Gladys brags about how much more advanced Edgar is than Tabatha. Endora uses witchcraft to make Tabatha talk fluently (voiced by an uncredited June Foray). Gladys tells Abner, who does not believe her. Gladys tells Darrin about Tabatha talking. Darrin gets upset with Endora when he finds out what she did. Gladys comes by with some reporters. Endora, who is angry at Darrin for berating her, makes Tabatha speak in front of the reporters. The story makes its way into the national news. Larry wants to use Tabatha for some ads. Sam tries to tell Endora that what she did will have an adverse effect on Tabatha. Sam and Endora find a way to stop the story cold by telling everyone that Endora is a ventriloquist. Don Hanmer as 2nd Reporter. Clete Roberts as himself. Note: Filmed January 21, 1966.; This was the final episode filmed with actress Alice Pearce playing nosy neighbor Gladys Kravitz. She died of ovarian cancer 6 weeks later, on March 3, 1966.
63	27	"The Leprechaun"	William Asher	Paul David & John L. Greene	March 17, 1966
Darrin comes home and Samantha introduces him to a leprechaun named Brian O'Brian (Henry Jones). Sam explains to Darrin that Brian claims to belong to Darrin's family. Brian says that he came to the U.S. to reclaim his lost pot of gold. Without the gold, he has no powers. The fireplace in which he was hiding it was transported into a new house in the U.S. by the house's wealthy new owner, James Dennis Robinson (Parley Baer). Darrin says he does not want Sam using any magic to get it back. Sam says she could not anyway as the gold has leprechaun magic on it. Brian claims the Robinson house is near-by. Darrin goes to speak with Robinson under the guise of getting his account. Robinson wonders why Darrin keeps looking at the fireplace. Later that night Brian decides to break into Robinson's house, only to be caught and jailed. Brian tells Officer Michael Fogerty (Jess Kirkpatrick), because he is Irish, that he is a leprechaun. Brian calls Sam from jail and Darrin lets Sam get him out. When Sam and Brian go to Robinson's house they discover that Robinson has already found the gold. But, it turns out that Robinson believes in leprechauns and gives Brian his gold back. They work out a deal where Brian's picture will be used in Robinson's ad campaign and Darrin will get the account. Note: Filmed February 3, 1966.
64	28	"Double Split"	Jerry Davis	Howard Leeds	March 24, 1966
Darrin and Samantha are going to a cocktail party at the Tates' home where they hope to impress client Mr. Kabaker. Sam winds up talking to Kabaker's snobish daughter Miss Kabaker (Julie Gregg). The daughter provokes Sam into using witchcraft to hit her in the eye with an hors d'oeuvre. Insulted, the Kabaker's leave. The next day, Larry and Darrin have an argument over the incident and Larry calls Sam a child. Darrin then insults Louise and quits. Darrin tells Sam what happened and that he is going to try and get a job at the Ames agency. Sam and Louise come up with a plan to get their husbands to be friends again. Sam uses witchcraft to ruin Darrin's chances with Mr. Ames (Dan Tobin). Darrin and Sam have a fight, which was her plan, and he leaves to stay at the men's club. Sam gets the Desk Clerk (Ivan Bonar) at the club to give Larry, who has had his own fight with Louise, the same room as Darrin's. The two men become friends again and decide to go back to their wives. Note: Filmed February 10, 1966.
65	29	"Disappearing Samantha"	William Asher	Paul David & John L. Greene	April 7, 1966
Darrin has to go to see a lecture by Osgood Ritemire (Bernard Fox). He has written a book that the agency is promoting. Sam knows Osgood as a professional witch debunker who spreads a lot of lies. Sam wants to go with Darrin and promises to be good. At the lecture, Sam can only take so much and she uses her powers to embarrass Osgood. Osgood then unknowingly employs an amateur spell to make her disappear. It was only very temporary and then Sam reappears. When they get home, Sam finds her disappearance happens again and again against her will. Not paying attention, neither Darrin nor Sam can remember the incantation, so Endora does not know how to solve the problem. Darrin goes to see Osgood, but he will not repeat the incantation. That night, Robert Andrews (Foster Brooks), an editor of a magazine interested in doing an article about Osgood, is at Darrin's home. The Tate's and Endora are there as well. Osgood calls and says he cannot make it, but Endora finds a way to get him there. Osgood arrives and Endora disappears. It turns out he has a ring given to him by an ancient mystic that unknowingly allows him to perform the magic. Sam destroys the ring which cancels the spell. She makes an identical looking replacement to give to Osgood. Nina Wayne as Beverly Wilson. Note: Filmed January 27, 1966.; The last episode featuring Irene Vernon as Louise Tate.; Fox was cast as Dr. Bombay starting in Season 3.
66	30	"Follow That Witch (Part 1)"	William Asher	Bernard Slade	April 14, 1966
Samantha meets Harriet Kravitz, Abner's sister. Things get awkward when Sam changes the size of a chair she is painting and Harriet comes back and notices the difference. Meanwhile, Darrin pitches a campaign to Mr. Robbins (Jack Collins), the president of a baby food company. Mr. Robbins likes what he sees and wants to sign with Darrin. The company's advertising manager, George Barkley (Steve Franken) wants to take some time before committing. Barkley hires private detective Charlie Leach (Robert Strauss) to learn more about Darrin's home life. After a week, Leach tells Barkley that Darrin does nothing wrong. Barkley now wants Leach to investigate Sam. Leach talks to Harriet and she tells him the strange things that Gladys told her about Sam. Leach does not believe it. Leach catches Samantha using her powers. He asks her some questions and Sam can tell he is up to something. She uses some magic to chase Leach out of the house. Sam tells Darrin what happened. She catches Leach snooping around the garage. Sam puts him on a window ledge of a tall building. Leach tells Barkley all the strange things he witnessed and Barkley does not believe him. Something Charmaine (Virginia Martin), Charlie's wife, says, gives him the idea to blackmail Sam. Notes: Filmed February 17, 1966.; Due to Alice Pearce's illness at time of filming (she died a few weeks later), Mary Grace Canfield makes her first appearance as Harriet Kravitz, who is said to be keeping house for her brother Abner while Gladys is visiting her mother.
67	31	"Follow That Witch (Part 2)"	William Asher	Bernard Slade	April 21, 1966
Private investigator Charlie Leach tells Samantha that he has proof that she is a witch. He says he will tell Darrin's potential client, Robbins Baby Food, unless Samantha gives him several expensive gifts. Sam tells Leach that she does not like him and turns him into a parrot. Sam reluctantly agrees to give Leach what he wants. At his apartment, Leach asks for a new car. Sam puts the car in the apartment and leaves. Mrs. Granite (Renie Riano), the landlord, comes by for the rent and sees the car. Sam comes back, puts the car on the street and gives Leach new clothes. She then fixes up the apartment and tells Leach she never wants to see him again. Meanwhile, Darrin finds out from secretary Betty that Barkley from Robbins Baby Food hired a private detective to check him and Sam out. Sam and Darrin go to give Robbins and Barkley a piece of their mind. Robbins says he knows nothing about a detective. Barkley admits he hired Leach. Sam uses witchcraft to get Barkley in even more trouble and Robbins fires him. Robbins apologizes and Darrin winds up getting the account. Darrin gives Samantha permission to teach Leach a lesson. Leach comes by and confronts Sam. She puts him in a Mexican bullfighting ring. Note: Filmed February 22, 1966.
68	32	"A Bum Raps"	Jerry Davis	Herman Groves	April 28, 1966
Samantha is expecting the arrival of Darrin's Uncle Albert (Henry Hunter), whom she has never met. Horace Dilliway (Cliff Hall) and William Dunn (Herbie Faye) watch as Darrin drives away. They were a vaudeville team, but are now hobos that sponge free meals. Horace goes to the Kravitz home and tries to get a meal from Harriet, who turns him down. Horace then goes to Sam's house and she mistakes him for Albert. Sam treats Horace very kindly and enjoys when he sings to Tabatha. Uncle Albert arrives and Horace tells him that Darrin and Sam moved. William believes they have the perfect opportunity to rob the Stephenses, but Horace does not want to as he has become fond of Samantha. Harriet comes by and thinks she recognizes Horace. As she is saying goodbye, Horace takes Harriet's wrist watch. Harriet comes back with Abner and accuses Horace of theft. Sam wants to help him and uses magic to put the watch back on Harriet's wrist. She soon finds out that Horace is not Uncle Albert, but lets him stay anyway. Darrin comes home and Sam explains that it is not Albert and asks him to play along. Late that night the pair go through with the robbery, but Horace feels bad about it. Sam and Darrin find all their furniture gone. Horace finds out that Sam and Darrin knew he was not Albert and they still treated him kindly. Horace has a change of heart and gets out of the truck. Sam finds a way to get William to bring back the furniture and she makes Horace feel better about himself. Note: Filmed March 12, 1966.
69	33	"Divided He Falls"	R. Robert Rosenbaum	Paul Wayne	May 5, 1966
Samantha tells Endora that after six attempts to take a trip to Florida, this time Darrin says nothing will stop them. Larry introduces Darrin to Sanford Stern (Frank Maxwell) of Stern Chemicals. Due to unforeseen circumstances, Darrin will have to cancel his trip to work on the account. Sam is not happy but she understands. Endora then splits Darrin in two (one serious, one playful) so that Sam can take her vacation. Darrin tells Sam to start packing for the trip and he goes upstairs. Sam goes in the den and sees Darrin working. Sam figures out what Endora did. Endora tells Sam that at least half of Darrin can have fun on the vacation. To explain her absence, Sam tells the working Darrin that she will go to Florida with her mother and he says that's OK. Larry and Stern are growing tired of Darrin's non-stop work on the account. In Florida, Sam is having a hard time keeping up with fun side Darrin. At dinner, Larry and Stern want to relax a little, but work Darrin keeps pressing the account. Fun Darrin has a large group of people partying in their room and Sam wonders if they can afford it. Darrin tells her to just use magic. Sam calls for Endora and tries to explain to fun Darrin what she did. Sam brings work Darrin back to the hotel. The two Darrin's see each other. Sam and Endora make the two Darrins one again. Joy Harmon as Francie. Notes: Filmed March 8, 1966.; Remade in Season 6 as "Samantha's Better Halves", the first episode filmed featuring Dick Sargent.; In 1997, TV Guide ranked this episode No. 48 on its "100 Greatest Episodes of All Time" list.; This episode was parodied on The Rerun Show in 2002.
70	34	"Man's Best Friend"	Jerry Davis	Bernard Slade	May 12, 1966
Samantha is two days away from going a month without using witchcraft. Suddenly a teenage warlock shows up in Sam's kitchen and she does not know who it is. Turns out he is Rodney (Richard Dreyfuss) and Sam babysat with him when he was much younger. He claims he is in love with her. Samantha tells him to leave since she is happily married and has a baby. Darrin finds a dog outside and would like to keep it. Sam learns the dog is Rodney. He says he wants to check up on Darrin. If he deems Darrin worthy, he will leave the next day. Rodney decides to try and split Sam and Darrin up. He leads Harriet Kravitz to believe he and Sam are having cocktails together. Rodney goes to Darrin's office pretending to answer the ad for a missing dog. Harriet runs into Darrin and tells him about the man she saw in his house. Rodney tells Sam that if she and Darrin are still together by that evening, he will leave forever. Darrin tells Sam what Harriet told him. Sam tries to explain that the dog is Rodney. Darrin thinks Sam is lying because he met the dog's owner in his office. They have an argument and Darrin goes to spend the night in the den. In the end, Darrin did trust Sam and he turns the tables on Rodney. Rodney's Mother comes by to get him. Note: Filmed March 18, 1966.
71	35	"The Catnapper"	R. Robert Rosenbaum	Howard Leeds	May 19, 1966
Darrin has been spending a lot of time at the office preparing for a big sales meeting. Darrin tells Sam that he is having lunch with a Tony Devlin, an executive from the cosmetics company. After Darrin leaves, Endora shows up. She suggests that Darrin has something on the side and that's why he has not been home much. What they do not know is that Charlie Leach is outside watching them. He sees Endora use magic and finds out she is also a witch. Larry introduces Darrin to Toni Devlin, who turns out to be a beautiful woman. Darrin and Toni make it clear their relationship will be purely business. Endora and Sam see Darrin and Toni at a restaurant and Endora suspects the worst. That evening Toni comes by unexpectedly needing to talk to Darrin. Endora turns Toni into a cat and leaves. Leach was outside again and saw the whole thing. Charlie steals the cat. The next morning Darrin panics because he and Toni are to be at the meeting later. Charlie comes by and offers to return Toni for one million dollars. Sam gives Leach what she says is a money tree. Sam decides to teach him once and for all not to mess with her by changing him into a mouse when he is by Toni the cat. Leach returns the cat and Darrin takes it to the office. Sam get Endora to turn Toni back into a human being, all before Darrin and Toni's important business meeting. Leach learns that his money tree only grows leaves. Note: Filmed March 24, 1966.
72	36	"What Every Young Man Should Know"	Jerry Davis	Paul David & John L. Greene	May 26, 1966
Although Darrin tells Samantha that he would have married her if he knew ahead of time that she was a witch, Samantha is not totally convinced. Endora does not believe Darrin would've proposed had he known. She sends Sam back in time to find out. Sam goes back to the night she was going to cook dinner for him. Sam arrives at Darrin's apartment and tells him she is a witch. He does not believe her and she uses magic to put a dinner on the table. Darrin says it does not matter, but when she tries to hug him, he runs out of the room. The next day, Darrin tells Larry that Sam is a witch. Sam pops in and out of the office to prove it to Larry. Larry sees a business advantage to having Sam as a witch. Later, Darrin tells Sam he loves her and he is about to propose to her. Larry comes by and Sam now thinks Darrin was going to propose only to help the agency out. Sam leaves. Back to the future, Sam and Darrin get into a fight when she thought he only married her to use her. They ask Endora to send them back again. Darrin proves to Sam he would not have used her by quitting his job and kicking Larry out. Darrin meets Endora and he proves to her he wants to marry Sam. Back to the future and all is now well. Note: Filmed March 30, 1966.
73	37	"The Girl with the Golden Nose"	R. Robert Rosenbaum	Syd Zelinka & Paul Wayne	June 2, 1966
There's a mink coat that Samantha would really like to have. Darrin is disappointed that he has not progressed more in his career. Darrin tells Sam that Larry is not letting him handle the Waterhouse account. Sam gets a call from Louise who tells her that Larry changed his mind and will give Darrin the account. Sam is not to tell Darrin as Larry wants to surprise him. Darrin is sure Samantha's magic is behind Larry's change of heart. Darrin acts silly in front of conservative Mr. Waterhouse. Darrin's belief is strengthened when Waterhouse likes his ideas. He now believes Samantha is giving him a charmed life and decides to go with it. Darrin buys Sam the fur coat. Larry calls Sam because he is worried about Darrin's new found belief he can do no wrong. Samantha has to find a way to show Darrin that it was not her magic, but really his confidence and talent that are getting him these things. When Darrin comes home he finds everything very fancy and he meets Charles the Butler (Owen McGiveney). After a discussion, Darrin realizes Sam did not use witchcraft to help him at work. Sam changes to house back to normal. Alice Backes as Betty. Note: Filmed April 6, 1966.
74	38	"Prodigy"	Howard Morris	Fred Freeman & Lawrence J. Cohen	June 9, 1966
Samantha tells Darrin that they are invited over to the Kravitz's to watch Gladys' brother Louis Gruber (Jack Weston) play violin on TV. Flashback to when they first met Louis. Louis is a very gifted violinist, but he has not played in public since he was nine years old. Abner says that during Louis' performance, his knickers fell down and he was very embarrassed. Louis does play for Sam and Darrin, but he is very shaky when he is finished. Sam would like to get Louis to play at the hospital benefit. When Sam tells Louis that she arranged for him to play at the benefit in front of 500 people, he faints. Sam tells Darrin that Louis will be practicing at their house. Louis tells Sam that he is afraid. He tries smashing his violin, but Sam uses her magic to protect it. Abner comes by and accidentally sits on the violin, breaking it. Louis is glad because now he will not be able to play. Sam zaps up a Stradivarius for him. It is almost time for the benefit and Gladys says that Louis is gone. He took a cab to the airport but Sam gets him back. Louis then goes down a manhole, but Sam gets him into the auditorium. The curtain opens and Sam gets Louis to start playing and he gets his confidence back. Back to the present and Sam, Darrin, Gladys and Abner are watching Louis perform on TV. His pants fall down. Notes: This was the sixth episode of Season 2 to be filmed (June 24, 1965) but the final one broadcast. Samantha was still being portrayed as pregnant, and Alice Pearce was stil alive. An introduction was filmed to present the episode as a flashback.; This is the last episode broadcast in black and white.; It is also the last appearance of Julie Young and Tamar Young in the role of Tabatha as a baby.

=== Season 3 (1966–67) ===
Episodes in Season 3 and onwards were filmed in color.

No. overall	No. in season	Title	Directed by	Written by	Original release date
75	1	"Nobody's Perfect"	William Asher	Doug Tibbles	September 15, 1966
Darrin is worried about Tabatha's one year pediatrician check-up. At Doctor Koblin's (C. Lindsay Workman) office, Samantha has him tell Darrin over the phone that Tabatha is just fine. While Koblin is on the phone, Sam witnesses Tabatha use magic for the first time. Back at home, Sam sees Tabatha use her magic again and gets worried about what Darrin will think. Endora comes by and sees Tabatha use magic and she is thrilled. Sam does not want Endora to say anything to Darrin. Meanwhile, Larry tells Darrin that he is bringing client Mark Robbins (David Lewis) to Darrin's house that evening for cocktails. Darrin comes home and when Tabatha does some magic, he thinks Endora did it. That night Robbins sees Tabatha and wants to use her in his ad campaign. Robbins suggests getting Diego Fenman (Robert Q. Lewis), the famous baby photographer. Sam tries to talk the men out of it. At the photo studio, Diego is taking pictures Tabatha, but her use of magic on her toys makes him think he is going crazy. Diego says he cannot work with Tabatha. Darrin is pleased with the pictures Diego did take because he thinks Diego used trick photography. Sam still does not know how she will tell Darrin about Tabatha's new-found powers. Notes: Filmed July 11, 1966.; First episode that aired in color. First appearance of Erin Murphy and Diane Murphy as Tabatha.
76	2	"The Moment of Truth"	William Asher	David V. Robison & John L. Greene	September 22, 1966
It is the morning of Samantha and Darrin's anniversary. Sam is hoping that Darrin will be in a good mood so she can tell him about Tabatha's witchcraft. Sam gets Aunt Clara to babysit, who comes over in the afternoon. Aunt Clara does not know about Tabatha's magic. She begins to believe that she is not well because Tabatha's magic makes her think her own witchcraft has gone haywire. Sam wants Clara to go home to rest, leaving her without a babysitter. Sam and Darrin decide to hold a small anniversary cocktail party for themselves and the Tates. That night, Sam is preoccupied because she notices that Tabatha is using her magic. When Darrin sees some magic happening, Sam leads him to believe it is Aunt Clara's leftover magic. Darrin finally learns that Tabatha is a witch. Sam tries to tell Darrin that she be able to train Tabatha when to use her magic. Darrin tries to find a way to get the Tates to leave, but Larry does not want to go. Sam finds a way to make Larry think he is had too much to drink. Darrin tells Sam that he does not mind living with two witches. Notes: Filmed July 6, 1966.; First episode featuring Kasey Rogers as Louise Tate.
77	3	"Witches and Warlocks Are My Favorite Things"	William Asher	David V. Robison & John L. Greene	September 29, 1966
Samantha is awakened during the night by Endora. She tells Sam that tomorrow will be a witch's coven to discuss Tabatha. Even though it is Saturday, Darrin will fortunately be working. The next morning, Endora and Aunt Clara arrive at the house. Sam is excited to see her father Maurice (Maurice Evans). He just came by to see Tabatha and leaves. Aunt Hagatha (Reta Shaw) and Aunt Enchantra (Estelle Winwood) then arrive and they begin the coven. They start to test Tabatha's power. Darrin then comes home unexpectedly. When Tabatha proves to be the first exceptional witch of her generation, Enchantra feels that she should be taken away to attend Hagatha's school. Darrin and Samantha say that Tabatha is staying with them. Endora, Hagatha and Enchantra place a spell on Darrin, Sam and Clara to gain control over the baby. Samantha calls upon her father to rescue them. He puts Tabatha back in her room. He then puts Endora, Hagatha and Enchantra on top of Mount Everest. They agree to take the spells off of Darrin, Sam and Clara. Later, Maurice comes by to babysit with Tabatha. Note: Filmed August 1, 1966.
78	4	"Accidental Twins"	William Asher	Howard Leeds	October 6, 1966
Samantha and Darrin are to go out with the Tates. They get Aunt Clara to babysit Tabatha. Larry calls saying their babysitter had to cancel. He wonders if Clara could watch their son Jonathan as well. Sam reluctantly says yes. While trying to conjure up a toy pony, Clara accidentally turns little Jonathan into twins. Samantha and Darrin return home with the Tates. Sam goes upstairs to get Jonathan and discovers the second one. Clara cannot remember the spell so she can reverse it and she does not know which is the real Jonathan. The Tates want to get going, but Sam does what she can to stall them. After Darrin finds out what happened, Sam suggests to the Tates that Jonathan sleep over. Louise could pick him up in the morning. Sam rushes the Tates out of the house. It is the next morning and Clara still has not figured out how to reverse the spell. Louise comes by. To stall her, Sam suggests that they have a party as it is Jonathan's birthday. Then Larry arrives. Complications arise when each Tate parent, separated in the house, gets a hold of one of the baby Jonathans. Sam finds a way for Clara to remember the spell. Note: Filmed June 23, 1966.
79	5	"A Most Unusual Wood Nymph"	William Asher	Ed Jurist	October 13, 1966
Sam tells Darrin that a car just pulled up. She thinks it is the friend of Darrin's great aunt Latisha, Gerry O'Toole (Kathleen Nolan). Gerry turns out to be Geraldine and she is apparently staying longer than Sam anticipated. Endora comes by and tells Sam that judging by her unique talents, Gerry is a wood nymph. Wood nymphs are centuries-long archenemies of witches. Sam wonders what Gerry wants and confronts her. Gerry admits to being a wood nymph and not a family friend. Gerry says that there's a 500-year-old curse that was placed upon Darrin the Bold and his descendants, of which Darrin is one. Darrin the Bold murdered her beloved Rufus the Red (Michael Ansara). Sam wants to go back to the 15th century to stop Darrin the Bold. Endora reminds her she will not have her powers so she will have to rely solely on her ingenuity to stop the slaying. Back in the past, Sam meets Darrin the Bold. Rufus the Red challenges Darrin when Darrin demands that Rufus pay for food and grain. Sam convinces Rufus that he could never beat Darrin. Sam does the same thing with Darrin. Rufus agrees to pay for food and grain. Back in the present, Sam is able to prove to Gerry that Rufus is alive and the curse is lifted. Henry Corden as Muldoon. Notes: Filmed August 18, 1966.; Darrin's ancestor, Darrin the Bold, appears again in "The Return of Darrin the Bold", broadcast February 4, 1971.
80	6	"Endora Moves in for a Spell (Part 1)"	William Asher	Story by : Robert Riley Crutcher; Teleplay by : Ruth Brooks Flippen	October 20, 1966
Uncle Arthur (Paul Lynde) comes by to see Tabatha. He makes a comment about his sister Endora and she shows up. They insult each other and she leaves. Darrin arrives and Arthur pulls a practical joke on him. Arthur has been around for three days now and Darrin does not like how he is influencing Tabatha. Endora zaps a house onto a nearby vacant lot across from the Stephenses' house to better keep an eye on Arthur. Arthur gets rid of the house. Endora puts it back just as Gladys Kravitz walks by. Arthur and Endora continue to zap and unzap the house from the lot. Gladys calls the police and Policeman Floyd (Paul Smith) and Policeman Noel (Sidney Clute) show up. Arthur and Endora continue arguing. Sam tells them to either stop fighting or go fight somewhere else. The two come to a peaceful understanding and both leave. Darrin notices the house is still there. Sam makes the house disappear while Gladys and the policemen are outside. Arthur and Endora do check up on each other. Notes: Filmed September 2, 1966.; First episode featuring Sandra Gould as Gladys Kravitz.
81	7	"Twitch or Treat (Part 2)"	William Asher	Robert Riley Crutcher & James S. Henerson	October 27, 1966
In the show's third Halloween episode, Endora zaps her house from the previous episode back to the vacant lot in order to hold a Halloween party there. Darrin is upset. Samatha tells him that they are invited. Uncle Arthur pops in and mentions all the witches and warlocks that will be at the party. Darrin wants the house gone. Sam tells Endora that the house has to go. Arthur mentions that he was not invited to the party. Endora gets rid of the house. Sam suggests she have the party somewhere else. Endora says she will have the party at Sam's house and she redecorates it. Just then Gladys shows up and Arthur zaps her back to her house. Sam tells Endora that if the party's at her house, Arthur is invited. It is the night of the party. Boris (Barry Atwater) arrives with his feline companion, which he zaps into a woman named Eva. Gladys sees what Boris did. Eva dances with Darrin and gives him whiskers. Gladys has Councilman Green investigate Sam's house. Darrin is surprised to see Willie Mays at the party. Arthur finds a way to get rid of Green. Sam stops Eva's flirting with Darrin. Endora gets even with Arthur when he interrupts her reciting a poem. She then zaps all her guests to Venice. Note: Filmed September 12, 1966.
82	8	"Dangerous Diaper Dan"	William Asher	David Braverman & Bob Marcus	November 3, 1966
Darrin walks in while Samantha is gossiping on the phone with Louise. Later, Diaper Dan (Marty Ingels), the Stephenses' diaper service man, comes by. He gives Sam a rattle for Tabatha. Dan then starts gossiping with Sam until Darrin walks in. It turns out that Dan had planted a microphone bug in the rattle and is listening to Sam and Darrin's conversation. Meanwhile, Darrin has been working hard on the Wright Pen campaign. So he and Larry are stunned when their competitor pitches the exact same campaign to Wright just an hour before them. What they do not know is that Dan is secretly under the employ of the A.J. Kimberly (Don Keefer) Advertising Agency. Wright gives Darrin 24 hours to come up with something else. Darrin comes up with another slogan and tells Sam. The next day, Wright tells Darrin and Larry that he is already seen that slogan from Kimberly. Larry now believes there's a spy at McMann & Tate. While at a bar, Larry thinks there may be a mike in an olive. Darrin becomes paranoid and thinks Sam's gossiping may have leaked the slogans. Sam and Darrin get into a fight but they make up. Darrin has one last presentation to give to Kimberly. Samantha does some research and finds out about the rattle. She then teaches Dan a lesson. Billy Beck as Bartender. June Foray as Diaper Dan Baby (voice). Note: Filmed July 18, 1966.
83	9	"The Short, Happy Circuit of Aunt Clara"	William Asher	Story by : Lee Erwin; Teleplay by : Ed Jurist	November 10, 1966
Samantha and Darrin are going to a business dinner at the Tates to make a pitch to potential client, MacElroy (Arthur Julian) Shoes. Sam tells Darrin that she got Aunt Clara to babysit Tabatha. She says that they have to be nice to Clara because she just broke up with warlock Octavius (Reginald Owen). He ran off with a younger witch. After Sam and Darrin leave, Clara's witchcraft goes bad and she winds up putting a piano on the stairs. Just then Gladys walks in and sees it. While trying to move the piano, one of Clara's spells inadvertently blackens out the entire Eastern seaboard. Sam calls Clara to make sure she is alright. Clara summons Octavius to help her turn the lights back on. Octavius tells her he does not want the young witch anymore, he wants Clara back. Octavius only manages to turn on the lights at Sam's house. Gladys sees this. The blackout causes problems for Darrin because he has to pitch his ideas by candlelight. Sam calls Clara again. Larry overhears the lights are on at Sam's house. He wants to bring MacElroy there to make it easier for Darrin. At the house, Clara hides Octavius in the closet. Things get hectic when men from the power company show up, along with Gladys. MacElroy wants to leave. An invisible Octavius helps Darrin win the account. Leo De Lyon as Jenkins. Notes: Filmed July 25, 1966.; This episode was inspired by the Northeast Blackout which occurred in November 1965. The title is a takeoff on The Short Happy Life of Francis Macomber by Ernest Hemingway.
84	10	"I'd Rather Twitch Than Fight"	R. Robert Rosenbaum	James S. Henerson	November 17, 1966
Darrin and Samantha have a fight over the fact that she gave away his favorite houndstooth sports jacket. Sam says that it was old and worn out and she gave it to a thrift shop. At the office, Darrin is ranting to Larry about what Sam did. Larry says that he and Louise have been seeing Dr. Matthew Kramer (Parley Baer), a psychiatrist. Larry tells Darrin what Kramer would probably say. Meanwhile, Sam is talking to Louise and Dr. Kramer is brought up. Darrin says he is going to buy Sam a present. Sam goes to see the Old Man (Burt Mustin) at the thrift shop to buy back Darrin's jacket. It had been dyed, but she buys it anyway and zaps it back to its original color. They give each other the gifts, which were based on Larry and Louise's advice, in an effort to make up for the fight. But the advice backfires and they bicker even more. Darrin leaves and spends the night at the office. Larry tells Darrin that he will call Dr. Kramer. Sam mentions maybe talking to Dr. Kramer to Endora. Endora insists that Samantha see none other than Sigmund Freud (Norman Fell) himself. Freud gives Sam some advice. Darrin and Kramer show up. Kramer does not recognize Freud and they get into an argument. They are about to come to blows, when Sam and Endora zap them away. Sam and Darrin make up. James Millhollin as Salesman. Bridget Hanley as Salesgirl. Notes: Filmed August 25, 1966.; Title is a play on Tareyton cigarettes' famous slogan, "Us Tareyton smokers would rather fight than switch."
85	11	"Oedipus Hex"	William Asher	David V. Robison & John L. Greene	November 24, 1966
Mrs. Lucille Dumont (Norma Varden) is at the house and she thanks Samantha for joining the women's fundraising committee. Endora comes by and comments to Sam about men always burying themselves in work. Without telling Sam, Endora hexes a bowl of popcorn. Anyone that eats some will lose all desire to work. Darrin is rushing off to work and grabs a handful of popcorn. Darrin decides to stay home. The Milkman ((Ned Glass)) has some popcorn. Then the television repairman (Paul Dooley) and Larry. Sam comes home and sees the four men playing cards. Sam reminds Darrin that she has a committee meeting today. Mrs. Mary Wheeler (Queenie Leonard) and Mrs. Sarah Albright (Helen Kleeb) come by. Meanwhile, client Randolph Parkinson comes by the office looking for Larry. When Parkinson finds out where Larry and Darrin are, he comes by the house and has some popcorn. Sam has to apologize to the women for the constant interruptions. A Policeman (Paul Smith) arrives. Samantha finally figures out what Endora has done to the popcorn. The men call a bunch of friends and raise the money that the women needed. Sam gets Endora to take the spell off and everyone gets back to work. Note: Filmed August 11, 1966.
86	12	"Sam's Spooky Chair"	R. Robert Rosenbaum	Coslough Johnson	December 1, 1966
Samantha is in an antique store and she speaks with the salesman (Howard Morton). She buys an old chair, that the salesman says is a badly made copy, for $25. Darrin's clients, Max (J. Pat O'Malley) and Adelaide Cosgrove (Anne Seymour), are coming by for a dinner party that night. Larry is worried about whether the Cosgroves will renew their contract. Max does not make a move without his wife's approval. Darrin comes home and sees the chair. That night, the Cosgroves and the Tates arrive. Adelaide really likes the chair and would like to have it. To hopefully help with the contract renewal, Darrin gets Sam to give her the chair as a gift. Later, Darrin tells Sam that he thinks there's something odd about the chair. Late that night, Sam finds the chair back in the house. The next morning, Darrin calls from the office to say the Cosgroves cannot find their chair. Darrin comes home and is struggling with the chair. Max comes buy and Sam reluctantly lets him take it. At the Cosgrove house, strange things are happening with the chair. Max still has not signed the contract and Adelaide is threatening to leave Max. Sam discovers that the chair is warlock Clyde Farnsworth (Roger Garrett). He had himself transformed long ago in Boston when Samantha rejected his affections. Now he is jealous of Darrin. Clyde agrees to let Sam change him back to human form. They agree to just be friends. Before he leaves, Clyde zaps up another chair for Adelaide. Note: Filmed September 29, 1966.
87	13	"My Friend Ben (Part 1)"	William Asher	James S. Henerson	December 8, 1966
Samantha is having a hard time fixing a lamp. Aunt Clara tries to conjure up an electrician, but zaps up Benjamin Franklin (Fredd Wayne) instead. Gladys is outside the window and sees what happened. Benjamin does not know where he is and is amazed by his surroundings. Darrin comes home. During dinner, they tell Benjamin about how his inventions are used worldwide. Sam would like to take him on a tour of the town, but Darrin does not think it is a good idea. Larry comes by and believes Ben is Darrin's campaign idea for Franklin Electronics. The next day, Franklin is astounded by the 20th century and wanders away. Sam and Clara find him by the Public Library. They then take him to a Fire Station. Unfortunately, he gets arrested for stealing a fire engine. He is then brought before a Judge (Harry Holcombe), who thinks it is a publicity stunt. Samantha and Darrin have to decide whether to keep Franklin around for his scheduled court date in four weeks time, or send him back regardless. Aunt Clara may have some say in the matter. Billy Beck as First Man. Tim Rooney as Teenager. Don Mitchell as Policeman. Mike Road as Chuck Hawkins. Al Rosen as Man Outside Fire House Notes: Filmed June 15, 1966.; First episode filmed in color. The DVD release does not include a laugh track.; Fredd Wayne, who was starring in a live one-man show about Benjamin Franklin at the time, guest-stars and was listed as Historical Consultant.
88	14	"Samantha for the Defense (Part 2)"	William Asher	James S. Henerson	December 15, 1966
In part 2, Darrin meets district attorney Chuck Hawkins (Mike Road), who will be prosecuting Benjamin Franklin. Chuck claims that he does not want the case to get out of hand. He is willing to reduce the charges and the fine if Franklin pleads guilty. Chuck wants Franklin at the court the next day. Larry says something about all the publicity helping the Franklin Electronics campaign. Chuck now believes this was all a publicity stunt developed by Darrin. He will keep the original charges and fully prosecute Franklin or whoever he is in real life. The trial will be in a couple days. Meanwhile back at the house, Aunt Clara is still trying to bring Franklin back. In front of a reporter, Bill Whalen (Paul Sand), Clara conjures up President Franklin Pierce. Clara is able to bring Benjamin back. Samantha uses some witchcraft to sway public opinion in Franklin's favor. The trial is starting. Hawkins and Franklin each give their opening statements. Between Franklin's eloquent reasoning and a little witchcraft from Sam, he is acquitted. Franklin also has a very wise answer to a question from the Judge. Jonathan Hole as Principal. Don Steele as Himself.
89	15	"A Gazebo Never Forgets"	R. Robert Rosenbaum	Jerry Devine & Izzy Elinson	December 22, 1966
Aunt Clara drops by. Samantha tells her that Darrin is on a business trip. Sam, Clara and Tabatha go to a park, where they meet a mother (Nora Denney) with her infant. They get into a bit of a confrontation because Tabatha keeps using witchcraft to take the other infant's stuffed pink polka dot elephant. Later while Clara watches Tabatha, Sam applies for a bank loan for home improvements. Sam speaks with Leon Scranton (Paul Reed), the bank president. Leon learns that Darrin works at McMann and Tate. Leon's brother has an account there and Scranton approves the loan. Just as a formality, bank loan investigator Hawkins (Steve Franken) will come by the house. Clara tries to conjure up the toy elephant for Tabatha but gets a real pink polka-dotted elephant instead. Clara tells Sam she can only reverse the spell if she has the actual stuffed elephant from the park. Hawkins comes by the house and sees the elephant. Larry calls Sam saying that Scranton called him because Hawkins told Scranton about the elephant. Larry will bring Scranton over later to prove there is no elephant. Hawkins comes back and sees Sam and Clara push the elephant into the backyard. Hawkins, Larry and Scranton show up. Clara goes to the park and manages to get the toy. Hawkins finds the elephant but it keeps moving to other places before the others can see it. They think Hawkins is crazy and leave. Notes: Filmed October 19, 1966.; First of 14 episodes that Dick York does not appear in. This first and only time due to a bereavement in his family.
90	16	"Soap Box Derby"	Alan Jay Factor	James S. Henerson	December 29, 1966
Samantha helps 12-year-old Johnny Mills (Michael Shea) practice for the soap box derby race. She runs into Gladys at the track. Gladys brags about her nephew, Leroy 'Flash' Kravitz, and what a great racer he is. Johnny does not want his father (William Bramley) to know about the racer. Johnny comes by the house. He tells Sam and Darrin that his father wants him to be a doctor. Johnny does not have a mother. Johnny asks Sam to get his father to sign the application for the race. Sam goes to see Mr. Mills, who is an auto mechanic. Mills does not want his son to wind up doing manual labor the way he has to. Mills does sign the application but says he will be too busy to watch his son race. It is the day of the race and Johnny wins his round and will be in the finals. Johnny races against Leroy in the finals and wins. Sam and Darrin learn from Mr. Martin (Arthur Peterson), of the Derby Rules Committee, that Gladys filed a complaint. Mr. Martin would like to have Mr. Mills at the hearing. Gladys accuses Sam of helping Johnny. Sam does get Mr. Mills to come by. Mills comes to Johnny's defense and he is still declared the winner. Johnny goes to the national finals in Akron, Ohio and wins there. Note: Filmed September 23, 1966.
91	17	"Sam in the Moon"	R. Robert Rosenbaum	James S. Henerson	January 5, 1967
Darrin is watching pictures from the Moon probe on TV. Samantha says she has seen the moon. Later, Endora gives Sam a hard time for doing menial housework. Endora talks Sam into shopping for "warlock tea" in Tokyo. After they get back, Sam says she has to get back to cleaning. Darrin comes home and catches Sam using witchcraft to clean. Darrin is getting irritated and asks her what she did all day. Sam has had enough and flippantly states she had been to the Moon. Darrin starts to believe her. He goes to see Mr. Grand (Joseph Mell) at the drugstore. Darrin would like to have the tea analyzed, thinking it might be Moon dust. Darrin dreams that he is being interrogated by men at NASA. He feels bad when Sam is jailed. Darrin wakes up and still believes Sam went to the Moon. She tells him her and Endora went to Tokyo. Darrin feels silly that he took the tea to be analyzed. Sam tells him it was not ordinary tea, it was Warlock tea. Grand calls and says there is something strange about the tea and he showed it to his brother-in-law. Grand and Harry (Baynes Barron) come by and Sam finds a way to get rid of the tea. Tim Herbert as Frank. Note: Filmed November 17, 1966.
92	18	"Ho Ho the Clown"	William Asher	Richard Baer	January 12, 1967
Samantha tells Endora that she is taking Tabatha to a tapping of the "Ho Ho the Clown Show". Solow Toys, a client of Darrin's, sponsors the show and they got free tickets. Endora decides to go with. At the studio, Ho Ho the Clown (Joey Forman) is handing out balloons to the children, but Tabatha does not get one. Sam explains to Endora that because Tabatha is related to Darrin, she is ineligible to win any prizes. That displeases Endora and makes her enchant Ho Ho to give prizes to her grandchild anyway. Larry and Darrin are watching the show and Larry wonders why Tabatha got the prizes. Back at home, Darrin confronts Sam and he knows what Endora did. What they do not know is that Endora also put a spell on Ho Ho to make Tabatha the one and only person for whom he will do the show. Larry finds out from the Producer (Charles Stewart) about Ho Ho's demand. At the studio, Darrin and Larry run into Mr. Solow (Dick Wilson). Solow wants to know who the girl is that Ho Ho is paying special attention to. Back at home, Darrin is worried about the inevitable problem of implied fraud when Solow finds out that Tabatha is his daughter. Ho Ho comes by the house with a pony for Tabatha. Sam finally gets a hold of Endora and gets her to take the spell off Ho Ho. Larry and Solow then arrive. Solow wants to cancel the show and his account with the agency. Sam and Darrin come up with the idea that it was all a publicity stunt for a new doll that looks like Tabatha. Solow loves the idea. Note: Filmed November 11, 1966.
93	19	"Super Car"	William Asher	Ed Jurist	January 19, 1967
Samantha asks Endora to try to be nice to Darrin. Endora conjures up the Reactor Mach II car, a futuristic prototype, as a gift for Darrin. What Darrin does not know is that it is the actual car and not a copy. Meanwhile, Joe (Dave Madden) and Charlie (Herb Ellis), the car's two confused designers, try to figure out what happened to the car. Despite loving the car, Darrin feels he cannot except it because it was a product of witchcraft. Sam talks him into keeping it. Larry and one of McMann and Tate's clients, Mr. Sheldrake, are discussing the problem with the ad campaign. Darrin discovers the car is not a copy and is worried that someone will find out. Endora thinks Darrin has insulted her and leaves. After an earlier call from Darrin, Larry and Sheldrake come by to see the car. Darrin reluctantly lets Sheldrake take the car for a drive. Sam gets Endora to return. Endora agrees to send the car back, but does so with Sheldrake inside of it. Joe and Charlie are stunned when the car reappears with Sheldrake in it. Larry thinks that Sheldrake drove off with the car. Sheldrake calls Sam and says that he got permission to use the car in an Ad campaign. Notes: Filmed November 23, 1966.; The car was later featured as Catwoman's "Kitty Car" in an episode of Batman, and as the Jupiter 8 in an episode of Star Trek.
94	20	"The Corn Is as High as a Guernsey's Eye"	William Asher	Ruth Brooks Flippen	January 26, 1967
A depressed Aunt Clara comes by. She tells Samantha that she is going to give it up and change herself into something useful like a footstool. Meanwhile, Larry tells Darrin that the Whittle Agency, a rival, has a publicity stunt for the Morton Dairy account. Darrin has been working on that account. They are going to put Ginger, Morton's world famous cow, on display in the lobby of this building. Sam calls Darrin and asks if they could take Clara out to lunch to try and cheer her up. Sam and Clara arrive at Darrin's building. Sam has to run off for a couple minutes to get Darrin's watch from a jeweler. Clara wanders off in the building. Sam returns and thinks that Clara turned herself into the cow. Sam zaps the cow back to her house. She has to hide the cow because Louise is there babysitting. Louise does see the cow. Darrin calls Sam because they did not arrive for lunch. Sam says they came home. Larry tells Darrin they may still have a chance at the Morton account as Whittle lost the cow. Whittle, C. L. Morton (Howard Smith) and the authorities try to locate Ginger the cow. Darrin finds Clara in the building and calls Sam. While on the phone, Darrin overhears Larry's call with Louise who says Sam has a cow in the house. Darrin has an excuse for the cow. Sam manages to bring Ginger back before things get even more out of hand. Joseph V. Perry as Policeman Henerson. Don Penny as Barney. Notes: Filmed December 5, 1966.; Episode title is a paraphrase of a line from the song "Oh What a Beautiful Mornin'" from Oklahoma!—"The corn is as high as an elephant's eye."
95	21	"The Trial and Error of Aunt Clara"	William Asher	Ed Jurist	February 2, 1967
Endora wakes up Samantha during the night. She says that Aunt Clara's witchcraft is getting so bad that she will have to be put on trial. Clara could be banished to earthbound mortality or she can choose to turn herself into an inanimate object forever. Clara has chosen Sam to be her defense attorney. The Witches Council will hold the trial in Sam's house in the morning with Judge Bean (Arthur Malet) presiding. The next morning, Darrin leaves for work and Aunt Clara shows up. Sam has Clara practice her magic, but she makes a desk disappear. Darrin calls Larry from the office and asks him to stop by the house and pick up some papers. Clara gets the desk back and Larry gets the papers. But now Judge Bean, Aunt Enchantra (Ottola Nesmith) and Aunt Hagatha (Nancy Andrews) show up in a car in the living room. Sam gets Larry out of the house before he can see the car and the others. The trial starts. Larry winds up getting the wrong papers, so Darrin heads home. Sam uses some of her own magic to help Clara. While Sam is keeping Darrin out of the living room, Clara makes several blunders. Judge Bean sentences Clara to be Earth bound. Darrin, however, may unwittingly help to come up with the best defense. Note: Filmed December 9, 1966.
96	22	"Three Wishes"	William Asher	Robert Riley Crutcher	February 9, 1967
Darrin learns last minute from Larry that he has to make a business trip to Honolulu that afternoon. Darrin wishes he could take Samantha, but he cannot. To prove what Endora believes are Darrin's lecherous intentions, she tells Sam she will grant him three wishes without his knowledge. When Darrin gets to the office, Larry tells him there's been a change of plans. It seems the clients want Larry to make the trip. When Sam finds out about the change, she believes that was Darrin's wish number one. This helps prove Endora wrong. However, Darrin has to take blonde swimsuit model Buffy Baker (Linda Gaye Scott) to Boston. Endora tells Sam that going to Boston with Buffy was Darrin's wish number two. When a freak snowstorm keeps Darrin in Boston, it could prove that Endora is right. Sam now gets a little suspicious as it is quite warm in New York. When Buffy cannot get a hotel room, Darrin lets her have his. He will just stay at the airport. Things get worse when Sam calls Darrin's room and Buffy answers the phone. When Darrin finally gets home, Sam is not speaking to him. Sam claims she is going to stay with Endora. Darrin is able to prove he did nothing wrong when he shows Samantha he still can make the three wishes. Notes: Filmed December 16, 1966.; Partial remake of "Double Tate" from Season 2.
97	23	"I Remember You...Sometimes"	William Asher	David V. Robison & John L. Greene	February 16, 1967
Darrin tells Samantha that he and Larry ran into an important client and he could not remember the guy's name. Darrin bought a book on improving his memory. Without Darrin knowing about it, Endora casts a spell on his watch giving its wearer perfect memory. The next morning, Darrin annoys Sam when he brings up things about her that he remembers. Darrin's know-it-all memory irks important client Ed Pennybaker (Dan Tobin) even more. Louise and Sam come by the office. Pennybaker and his wife Cynthia are invited to Sam's house for dinner. Back at home, Sam and Darrin get into a fight when he annoyingly remembers things again. That night, every time Ed brings up a subject, Darrin right away starts to bring up facts about it. Sam starts to suspect that Endora has something to do with Darrin's memory. Endora tells Sam she did not put a spell on Darrin, but on something he has with him. Sam zaps the watch off of Darrin and Cynthia picks it up. Cynthia starts to remember things. Because of something Cynthia says, Ed realizes he often monopolizes the conversation. Note: Filmed December 22, 1966.
98	24	"Art for Sam's Sake"	William Asher	Jack Sher	February 23, 1967
Samantha has taken up painting as a hobby. She wants to enter the one she is working on in a charity art exhibit and competition. Endora tells her that anything less than a masterpiece, will be a disgrace to the family name. Unimpressed by Sam's painting, Endora exchanges it with a famous Henri Monchet original and signs Sam's name to it. Meanwhile, Larry tells Darrin that client perfumer Mr. Cunningham (Arthur Julian) is arriving. Darrin says that the art exhibit is that evening. Larry says that Cunningham considers himself an art connoisseur, so Darrin should take him along. That night, Louise hears on the radio that Sam's painting won first prize in the competition. At dinner, Sam reminds Cunningham that the exhibit is for amateurs. At the exhibit, Larry and Louise tell Sam she won. Samantha learns what her mother has done when her painting is revealed. Cunningham likes what he sees and starts bidding on it. Darrin tries to out bid him and Larry is not happy. Cunningham eventually wins. They all go back to Sam's house. Sam learns from Endora that the painting will return to its original gallery at midnight. Sam is able to trade the painting for a perfume of Endora's. Cunningham sees Sam's original painting and wants it. Paul Sorensen as O'Leary. John A. Alonzo as Guard. Note: Filmed January 9, 1967.
99	25	"Charlie Harper, Winner"	R. Robert Rosenbaum	Earl Barret	March 2, 1967
Samantha and Darrin are hosting a dinner party for Darrin's old college friend, the overachieving and wealthy Charlie Harper (Angus Duncan). Charlie and his wife Daphne (Joanna Moore) arrive. During dinner, Charlie and Daphne talk about all the things they own, including a castle. Sam tries to talk up Darrin's accomplishments. Daphne is obviously condescending toward both Darrin and Sam. The Stephenses accept Charlie's last minute invitation to spend the weekend at one of their resort homes with a group of their wealthy and important friends. During the weekend, Charlie offers Darrin the presidency of an advertising agency he owns. Darrin turns him down. When Daphne offers to loan Sam some jewelry, Sam zaps up a case of them. Daphne mentions that with Darrin's salary, they have to be fake jewels. Sam then conjures up a special mink coat that Daphne falls in love with. Daphne tells Charlie that she has to have that coat. Darrin does not know what Charlie is talking about when he offers to buy the mink. Sam pulls Darrin aside and explains what she did. Darrin says the coat's not for sale. Sam tells Darrin she only did it because Daphne implied he was a loser. Darrin feels bad because he cannot give Sam those kind of things. Sam gives the mink to Daphne. Both Darrin and Daphne develop a new perspective on things. Henry Hunter as Senator Ross. Note: Filmed January 19, 1967.
100	26	"Aunt Clara's Victoria Victory"	William Asher	Robert Riley Crutcher	March 9, 1967 †
Darrin is away on a business trip. Larry calls Sam hoping to catch Darrin before he left. He wanted to talk to him about their client Mr. Morgan (Robert H. Harris), who is being a problem. Sam mentions the Victorian era to Aunt Clara and Clara would like to go and visit that time again. Clara accidentally makes Queen Victoria (Jane Connell) appear. Meanwhile, Larry is going over some things with Mr. Morgan and Morgan is being a bit of a tyrant. As Darrin is away, Morgan would like to meet Sam. The Queen is watching TV and gets offended when she sees a woman in a bikini. She takes a fireplace poker and destroys the picture tube. Larry comes by to ask Sam to have cocktails with Morgan. He sees the Queen's throne and then the TV. Larry then sees the Queen. Sam claims she is an eccentric Aunt of hers. Later, Larry and Morgan are at the house. Morgan meets the Queen and would like to talk to her alone. Things get out of hand and Larry tells Morgan off. Larry realizes he just lost a million dollar account. Samantha causes Mr. Morgan to dream that he is Queen Victoria and he comes to understand how dictatorial he can be. He apologizes to Larry and gives Larry his account. Clara manages to send the Queen back, but she winds up with Prince Albert. Notes: Filmed January 25, 1967.; Dick York does not appear in this episode.
101	27	"The Crone of Cawdor"	R. Robert Rosenbaum	Ed Jurist	March 16, 1967
Darrin and Samantha have a lunch date to celebrate their first meeting. As Darrin is leaving for work, he runs into Miss Terry Warbell (Julie Gregg). She is the beautiful young daughter of one of Darrin's clients. Sam and Endora are watching. Darrin calls Sam and says he will not be able to make the lunch date. He still has work to do with Terry. Endora thinks Sam should check up on Darrin. In spying on Darrin and Terry, Endora finds something rather odd about her. Terry seems more interested in Darrin and does not seem to know much about her father's business. Meanwhile, an elderly, confused woman arrives at the Kravitz's house. Gladys calls Samantha and she and Endora learn that the elderly woman is the real Miss Warbell. Sam brings the old woman to her house. Samantha and Endora learn that the young woman with Darrin is really the 500-year-old Crone of Cawdor (Dorothy Neumann). The Crone switched bodies with Terry. The Crone's mission is to be kissed by a mortal before the end of 12 hours, in order to switch ages with the kisser permanently, That means if Darrin kisses her, he will turn 500 years old. Sam learns from Larry that Darrin went to Terry's apartment. Terry starts to flirt with Darrin, but he tries to keep things professional. Samantha rescues Darrin before the clock strikes 6 PM and Terry's and The Crone's bodies switch back. Note: Filmed January 31, 1967.
102	28	"No More Mr. Nice Guy"	William Asher	Jack Sher	March 23, 1967
Endora and Darrin get into an argument when he catches her teaching witchcraft to Tabatha. Samantha tells Endora that Darrin can be very likeable. At the office, Larry and Darrin greet Frank Eastwood (Judson Pratt). He is from the Mayor's office and he wants them to create a new image for the Mayor. Endora casts a spell that whenever she rings a bell, people take an instant dislike to Darrin. Suddenly, Frank wants nothing to do with Darrin. Next, model Gloria Adams gets irritated with Darrin. Larry suggests that Darrin go see psychiatrist Dr. Bob Farnsworth (George Ives). Instead, Darrin goes to have a drink and tells bartender Max that no one likes him. Max thinks it might be a good idea to see Farnsworth. When Samantha finds out from Larry what's going on with Darrin, she immediately knows it is her mother's doing. Sam watches in on Darrin and Farnsworth. She does not like that Farnsworth is suggesting that the problems Darrin's having can be linked to his marriage. Sam makes Farnworth change his mind. Sam tells Darrin what Endora did and says he needs to get back to the office. Endora does remove the spell, but without Darrin's knowledge. Back at the office, Darrin is being overly accommodating to Horace Baldwin (Larry D. Mann). Darrin's bootlicking may do more damage than Endora's spell. Dick Wilson as Harry. Note: Filmed February 13, 1967.
103	29	"It's Wishcraft"	Paul Davis	James S. Henerson	March 30, 1967
Tabatha has been levitating her toys lately. Darrin is concerned because his parents will be visiting soon. Samantha asks Endora to help during the visit. Frank (Robert F. Simon) and Phyllis (Mabel Albertson) arrive. Phyllis and Endora clearly do not get along. Darrin calls Sam from the office and he wants Endora gone by the time he gets home. Phyllis overhears part of what Sam is saying and she thinks Sam and Darrin are fighting. Endora makes it rain on Darrin in his office. Darrin gets home and it is still raining on him. Sam gets Endora to stop the rain. When Darrin suddenly disappears, Sam realizes that Tabatha is at a stage called "wishcraft". Anyone she wishes to be near her will automatically appear. Phyllis tells Endora she thinks Sam and Darrin are fighting because Endora is always meddling in their lives. Despite Darrin acting very loving towards Sam, Phyllis still thinks something is wrong. Sam finds a way to convince Phyllis that everything is alright. Note: Filmed February 20, 1967.
104	30	"How to Fail in Business with All Kinds of Help"	Richard Kinon	Ron Friedman	April 6, 1967
Darrin taking Samantha on a vacation to Bermuda depends on the success of his latest campaign for Madame Maruska lipstick. Endora decides to give Darrin a little help by placing a spell on Madame Maruska's account representative, Arch Wilkerson (Henry Beckman). As Wilkerson is an old friend of Larry's, he wants to give the presentation. Wilkerson proceeds to give Darrin all the compliments and wants him to run the campaign. Darrin excitedly tells Sam what happened, but then he figures out it was all Endora's doing. The next day, Darrin and Larry find out that the reclusive Madame Maruska (Lisa Kirk) is coming to see Darrin. Madame Maruska is thrilled to meet Darrin and she insists Larry make him a partner in the agency. Believing that Endora is masquerading as Madame Maruska, Darrin tells her off and kicks her out. Darrin finds a way to explain his actions to Larry. Back at home, Darrin finds out from Sam that Endora was with her all day. Larry calls Darrin and fires him. Darrin goes to make things right with Madame Marsuka and finds Larry already there. Madame Marsuka wants nothing to do with them. At a bar, Larry and Darrin see their campaign ad for Marsuka lipstick in a newspaper. Back at the office, they find out that Darrin supposedly OK'd the ads without having the account. Darrin finds out that Sam placed the ads with witchcraft and gets upset. Larry comes by and tells Darrin that Marsuka lipstick orders were going through the roof. Madame Maruska wants to sign a contract for her entire line of products. Myra De Groot as Receptionist. Note: Filmed February 27, 1967.
105	31	"Bewitched, Bothered, and Infuriated"	R. Robert Rosenbaum	Howard Leeds	April 13, 1967
As Larry is away, Darrin is in no hurry to get to the office and is reading the paper. Aunt Clara comes by and zaps up her own newspaper. It turns out to be the next days' paper. Clara notices an article stating Larry Tate broke his leg. Larry and Louise are on their second honeymoon and they made sure no one knew where they went. Darrin wants Samantha to use witchcraft to find out where the Tates are, so they can prevent the accident. Sam is against the idea, but she gets them to the right resort. When they run into Larry and Louise, Darrin makes up an excuse as to why they are there. Larry starts to get very annoyed when Darrin is constantly around. Sam does not want to spy on the Tates while they are in their room, so she zaps back home. Sam finds out that a meeting Darrin was supposed to have the next day has been changed to today. Darrin gets zapped back leaving Sam to watch Larry. Later, Darrin is back and Larry gets even more annoyed. Larry tries to explain that this is actually their first honeymoon. When they went ten years ago, Larry broke his leg and the honeymoon was canceled. Sam finds out that Clara zapped up a ten year old paper. Sam zaps Larry and Louise back to when they first arrived at the resort. Notes: Filmed February 7, 1967.; This would be reworked as the I Dream of Jeannie episode "Tomorrow Is Not Another Day", expanding on a horse-racing aspect of the story.
106	32	"Nobody but a Frog Knows How to Live"	Richard Kinon	Ruth Brooks Flippen	April 27, 1967
Samantha and Tabatha are in the park when a man, Fergus F. Finglehoff (John Fiedler), approaches them and asks Sam for her help. He claims he is a frog and because of something Sam did, he knows she is a witch. He would like her to change him back into a frog. He follows Sam to her house and comes in the back. Fergus answers the phone and it's Darrin calling. After some confusion, Darrin tells Sam that he is bringing Larry, Louise and client Mr. Saunders (Dan Tobin) over for drinks later. Gladys comes by and Sam says Fergus is a friend of Darrin's. He tells Gladys he is a frog. The problem is Samantha does not have the power to undo another witch's spell. Sam zaps Fergus back to the park. Later, Fergus returns. He tries to blackmail Sam, as he threatens to tell all her neighbors that she is a witch if she does not help. Darrin and the others arrive. Sam introduces Fergus as a Professor friend of Darrin's. All Mr. Saunders seems interested in is having a drink and all Fergus can do is talk about frogs. Sam zaps Fergus back to the park and claims he went upstairs. After the others leave, Sam and Darrin find Fergus in the backyard talking to another frog. The frog is his frog girlfriend Phoebe (Corinne Camacho). Darrin suggests that Sam change Phoebe into a woman, which Sam does. After Sam learns something about the spell from Fergus, she is able to turn them both into frogs. Note: Filmed March 14, 1967.
107	33	"There's Gold in Them Thar Pills"	R. Robert Rosenbaum	Paul Wayne and Ed Jurist	May 4, 1967
Samantha tells Endora she cannot go shopping with her as Darrin is in bed with a cold. Sam goes to run an errand and leaves Endora to watch Tabatha. Wanting Darrin cured so Sam can go shopping, Endora summons witch doctor Dr. Bombay (Bernard Fox). Dr. Bombay does not treat mortals, but will make an exception this time. Darrin thinks Dr. Bombay is mortal. He gives Darrin a pill that instantly cures the common cold. Larry, who also has a terrible cold, comes by. Darrin gives him a pill and he is cured. Darrin and Larry try to get Dr. Bombay to market his magical miracle cold cure with their pharmaceutical client, Mr. Hornbeck (Milton Frome). It takes some doing, but they convince Dr. Bombay to give them the rights to the pill. Sam gets upset with Endora when she finds out about Dr. Bombay. At the office, Mr. Hornbeck comes by and he also has a cold. Larry and Darrin give him a pill and he is cured. Sam tells Darrin that Dr. Bombay is a warlock. Darrin's voice changes and Sam says that's a side effect of the pill. Sam gives him a different pill from Dr. Bombay, and Darrin's voice disappears. Larry and Hornbeck's voices change. Sam does get something from Dr. Bombay that returns the men's voices, but it also returns their colds. There is another side effect that Hornbeck is happy about. Notes: Filmed March 21, 1967.; First of 19 appearances of Bernard Fox as Dr. Bombay.

=== Season 4 (1967–68) ===
No. overall	No. in season	Title	Directed by	Written by	Original release date
108	1	"Long Live the Queen"	William Asher	Ed Jurist	September 7, 1967
Samantha learns that Ticheba (Ruth McDevitt), the Queen of the Witches, is coming for a visit. Ticheba arrives and tells Sam and Endora that she is abdicating and appoints Samantha to succeed her. After initially being honored, Sam decides she cannot accept because of Darrin. But then Sam realizes she really cannot turn the position down. She tells Darrin that she will perform whatever duties are required after midnight so as to not interfere with her mortal life. At the Witches Coven, Sam is officially made Queen. Late that night, Darrin is woken up by a raven wanting to see Sam. Darrin tells Sam he needs his sleep as he has a very important meeting with a potential client, Mr. Rohrbach (J. Edward McKinley). The next day, Rohrbach comes by the house. He is impressed with Darrin's work and will give him his account. Then the raven flies through the house. Rohrbach witnesses other strange things and changes his mind about the account. Darrin insists that Sam quits, but she says she has to serve for a least a year. After talking to a Stranger (Herb Ellis) at the bar and the bartender, Darrin has a change of heart. Darrin goes home. Sam says she does not know what will happen, but she will resign. Darrin tells Samantha that she can remain Queen. Carl Princi as Warlock Bird. Lal Chand Mehra as Warlock. Note: Filmed July 27, 1967.
109	2	"Toys in Babeland"	William Asher	Ed Jurist	September 14, 1967
Endora is baby-sitting Tabatha while Samantha goes to have lunch with Darrin. A Warlock Mailman (Burt Mustin) comes by. He tells Endora that an event she was to attend next week has been moved up to today. He suggests she bring a toy soldier (Jim Brooks) to life to fill in for her. The soldier cannot talk but he understands. Tabatha imitates the spell and soon every toy is life-sized and is playing in her room. Sam and Darrin arrive home and see all of the life sized toys. Sam cannot get a hold of Endora to undo the spell. Because of this they have to cancel a business dinner they were going to host for the Tates and an important client, Bob Chase (William Kendis). Darrin was able to get a hold of Louise, but not Chase. However, suspicious Larry believes the dinner cancellation was a way for Darrin to steal Chase and open his own agency. Larry comes by the house and sees the live dolls. He thinks it's a costume party. The soldier comes outside and Larry believes he is a company employee that Darrin wants to steal for his own company. Larry takes him to go have a drink and talk. Sam sees them drive off together. Darrin tracks them down to a local bar. Sam pops in and tells Darrin that Endora came back. Sam knows the spell and changes the soldier into a toy. Larry thinks he is had too much to drink because he was talking to a toy all night. Dick Wilson as Drunk Customer. Jeri Lynn Frazer as Girl Doll. Note: Filmed during Season 3 on March 6, 1967.
110	3	"Business, Italian Style"	William Asher	Michael Morris	September 21, 1967
Larry and Darrin are talking to Mr. Arcarius (Renzo Cesana), the Romani Foods account executive. The Italian based company is thinking of getting into the American market. Arcarius thinks that Mr. Romani (Freddie Roberto) would appreciate it if someone from the firm spoke Italian. Despite not knowing a word of Italian, Larry tells Arcarius that Darrin is fluent in the language. Larry tells Darrin to learn Italian or get another job. Endora would like for Samantha to be able to travel to Italy because of the account. Endora places a spell on Darrin that makes him able to speak perfect Italian. Sam discovers that Darrin is unable to speak or understand English. She knows that Endora is to blame. Larry comes by and Sam tries to come up with an excuse as to why Darrin does not understand English. At the office, Larry and Darrin meet Mr. Romani. At first Romani is very impressed with Darrin's Italian. But then he wants Darrin to speak to him in English. Sam finally gets a hold of Endora and tells her to remove the spell. Darrin starts to speak in English but with an Italian accent. Romani thinks that Darrin is mocking him. Darrin loses the accent and comes up with an excuse. Romani understands and gives them his account. Note: Filmed on June 8, 1967.
111	4	"Double, Double, Toil and Trouble"	William Asher	Ed Jurist	September 28, 1967
Darrin makes Samantha, who is in the midst of performing her duties as Queen, end a royal session early. Sam is not happy and neither is Endora. The next morning, Sam tells Darrin they had an agreement about her Queenly duties and Darrin apologizes. Sam will be out all day doing volunteer work for the church bazaar. Endora enlists Serena's help to seek revenge. Endora makes Serena look like Sam. Serena tells Darrin there were too many volunteers so they sent her home. Serena uses magic to start trouble with Darrin. Gladys sees Serena at the house and later she sees Sam at the bazaar. Darrin asks Larry to talk to Sam. Serena then kisses Larry. She continues to make a pass at Larry. Larry leaves after telling Darrin he has a problem. Serena continues to do things to hopefully end the marriage. After something that Abner tells Darrin, he starts to figure out that it's Serena in the house. Darrin is going to get even with Serena. Just then Sam comes home with a pie. Thinking it's Serena, Darrin throws the pie in Sam's face. Sam and Darrin then see Serena and Endora, who wind up with pies in their faces. Stanley Beck as Ferdy. Notes: Filmed August 11, 1967.; The first color episode in which Serena appears.; The title is from Act IV, Scene 1 of Macbeth.
112	5	"Cheap, Cheap"	William Asher	Ed Jurist	October 5, 1967
Samantha buys an expensive coat. Darrin thinks she should've consulted with him first. Despite Darrin saying she can keep it, Sam decides to take it back. At the office, Larry wants Darrin to handle the Bigelow Tire account. While Darrin is talking to Sam on the phone, Endora turns him into the most miserly person in the world. Mr. Bigelow (Parley Baer) is pleased to learn how frugal Darrin is. Back at home, Darrin complains about all the electricity that is being used in the house. Sam figures out that Darrin's cheapness is Endora's doing. Darrin tells Sam he wants to invite Mr. and Mrs. Bigelow to dinner. The next night, the Bigelows and Tates arrive. Sam tries to get a hold of Endora with no luck. Sam tries to put an extravagance spell on Darrin, but Mr. Bigelow gets it instead. Mrs. Bigelow is surprised at her husband's new attitude about spending money. Endora finally shows up and takes the spell off Darrin. The next day, Darrin gives Sam the coat. Note: Filmed June 26, 1967.
113	6	"No Zip in My Zap"	Richard Kinon	Barbara Avedon	October 12, 1967
While trying to fix some dishes that Tabatha broke, Samantha finds she has lost her powers. Endora summons Dr. Bombay. Bombay figures out that Sam has not lost her powers, they are just bottled up from non-use. To recover, Bombay makes Sam levitate or "fly". Meanwhile, Larry tells Darrin that he earned his bonus. Once lawyer M. J. Nilesmunster signs the contract, Darrin could have the biggest account of his career. Darrin remembers a Mary Jane Nilesmunster (Mala Powers), an old girlfriend, who vowed revenge on him. Darrin and Larry go to Nilesmunster's hotel room and it is Mary Jane. Darrin calls home and tells Sam not to get the tickets to Bermuda just yet as this deal might fall through. Endora tells Darrin that Sam cannot talk anymore as she is "flying". Darrin sees a housefly and thinks it's Sam. Larry and Mary Jane see Darrin talking to the fly. When Mary Jane signs the deal and does not seem to remember him, Darrin believes that Sam had something to do with it. Darrin comes home drunk and is mad at Sam because he believes she interfered. She tries to tell him about her lack of powers. But when some of her powers come back, he does not believe her. Sam accidentally zaps Darrin back to the bar. Darrin talks to Mary Jane and she tells him she did remember him. Darrin apologizes to Sam. Dick Wilson as Drunk. Note: Filmed August 18, 1967.
114	7	"Birdies, Bogeys and Baxter"	William Asher	David V. Robison & John L. Greene	October 19, 1967
Darrin has been getting up early in the morning to practice his golfing. He wants to impress potential client, Joe Baxter (MacDonald Carey). Endora puts a spell on Darrin to make him play as well as he did when he was in college. Darrin calls Samantha and says that his practicing has paid off, as he had a great game. Larry introduces Darrin to Joe, who is clearly very athletic. Joe says one can learn a lot about a man by how he plays golf. Joe invites the men and their wives to the club the next afternoon. Larry says that Louise will not be able to make it. Larry hopes that Darrin will not try to beat Joe. The next day over lunch, Joe is bragging about his college football days. The men go off to play golf. Joe's wife Margaret (Joan Banks) would like to see her bragging husband lose just once. Joe is getting irritated that Darrin is playing so well. Not knowing that Endora had already put a spell on Darrin, Sam also uses witchcraft to help Darrin's game. Larry wants Darrin to lose so they get Baxter's account and does what he can to sabotage Darrin's game. But Sam keeps helping Darrin. After Darrin wins, Larry fires him and Joe says he will take his account somewhere else. Something Margaret says makes everything work out. Frank Alesia as Golfer. Notes: Filmed July 20, 1967.; The plot device of Darrin becoming an ace golfer was borrowed from the I Dream of Jeannie episode "Watch the Birdie" (February 26, 1966).
115	8	"A Safe and Sane Halloween"	William Asher	James S. Henerson	October 26, 1967
It's the night before Halloween and Samantha is reading Tabatha a Halloween story. The story contains a magical goblin (Felix Silla), gremlin (Jerry Maren) and Jack O'Lantern (Billy Curtis). Sam leaves when she thinks Tabatha is sleeping. But Tabatha gets up and zaps the three out of the book into real life. The next day Gladys has her nephew Tommy (Bobby Riha) over and is fitting him in a Jack O'Lantern costume. That evening Sam takes Tabatha trick or treating. Darrin has to stay home as Larry and Louise are coming over. The goblin, gremlin and Jack O'Lantern see Tabatha leave and sneak out of the house. The three follow Sam and Tabatha. Sam believes they are just three mortal children. Some magic tricks happen and Sam thinks it's Tabatha's doing. Sam sends the three friends away and her and Tabatha zap back home. Sam learns that Tabatha zapped the friends out of her book and goes to find them. As a prank, Tommy switches places with the Jack O'Lantern. Sam finds the three and brings them home. She finds out that the Jack O'Lantern is Tommy just as Darrin, Larry and Louise come into Tabatha's room. While Sam tries to figure out how to switch Tommy and the Jack O'Lantern, the gremlin turns Tommy into a billy-goat. Things get confusing when Gladys shows up. Tabatha finally puts the three back in the book. Note: Filmed July 14, 1967.
116	9	"Out of Sync, Out of Mind"	Richard Kinon	Ed Jurist	November 2, 1967
Darrin's mother stops by and says she has left Frank as he constantly says she imagines things. She also found lipstick on his collar that he says came from a pie. Aunt Clara also stops by. Later, Darrin is showing a home movie of Samantha and Tabatha, but the picture and sound are out of sync. Aunt Clara fixes the problem, but it also causes Samantha's own voice to be occasionally out of sync with the movement of her mouth. Phyllis sees this, but Darrin suggests she may have imagined it. Aunt Clara goes to get Dr. Bombay. To avoid Phyllis, Sam pretends she is sick and goes to lay down. Phyllis still goes to see Sam. Bombay suddenly appears and Phyllis faints. He cures the sync problem, but then Sam develops green stripes on her face. Phyllis sees the stripes and wants to go for walk. Just then Frank drives up and Phyllis tells him about the stripes. The stripes disappear but Sam's voice is out of sync again. Aunt Clara remembers the reverse spell and Sam's voice is fine. Frank and Phyllis come in and she wonders where the stripes went. Phyllis agrees to go see a doctor and Frank and her make up. Now Darrin's voice is out of sync. Roy Roberts, instead of Robert F. Simon, appears as Frank Stephens. Note: Filmed August 24, 1967.
117	10	"That Was No Chick, That Was My Wife"	William Asher	Rick Mittleman	November 9, 1967
Darrin is looking forward to a relaxing weekend. Aunt Clara pops in. Larry then comes by. He wants Samantha and Darrin to go to Chicago to meet with the Springers (Herb Voland and Sara Seegar). Larry wants them to soften the Springers up so they will renew their Springer Pet Foods account. Aunt Clara says she will babysit Tabatha. In Chicago, Sam and Darrin are having lunch with the Springers. Back at home, Tabatha brings her toy monkey to life. Sam calls to check in and learns about the monkey. She pops home from Chicago and is unexpectedly seen by Louise. After Sam returns to Chicago, Mr. Springer says he going to renew his contract and will call Larry. Larry tells Springer that he is sorry Sam could not make the trip. Springer now thinks the woman with Darrin is his mistress. Springer decides to drop McMann & Tate. He tells his wife about Darrin's mistress and they leave. Back at home, Larry calls Darrin and tells him he got the Springer account back. He got it because he agreed to fire Darrin. Springer comes to New York and learns that Sam really is Darrin's wife. Sam explains to Louise that the person she saw was her cousin Serena. William Kendis as Man. Ethelreda Leopold as Restaurant Patron. Note: Filmed August 31, 1967.
118	11	"Allergic to Macedonian Dodo Birds"	Richard Kinon	Richard Baer	November 16, 1967
Endora is visiting Tabatha and suddenly her powers are gone. Samantha talks Darrin into letting Endora spend the night. The next morning Endora still has no powers. Sam summons Dr. Bombay. Bombay says that Endora is suffering from an allergic reaction to a Macedonian dodo bird (Janos Prohaska). He says he can cure Endora, but he needs a feather from the bird. Bombay thinks a relative may have acquired Endora's powers. Turns out it was Aunt Clara who received the powers. Aunt Clara is enjoying her new found witchcraft. When Endora says she is not leaving until she is cured, Darrin goes to the bar for a drink. They learn that Tabatha conjured up the bird out of a book in her room. Bombay is called back and he gets a feather from the bird. He makes a potion with the feather and has Endora drink it. Her powers are back. With Endora's power gone from her, Aunt Clara winds up on the roof of the house. Sam goes up to get her and Gladys sees this. Sam asks Darrin if he would be happy if she lost her powers. He says he loves her the way she is. Dick Wilson as Drunk. Note: Filmed September 14, 1967.
119	12	"Samantha's Thanksgiving to Remember"	Richard Kinon	Alfred Lewis Levitt & Helen Levitt (Credited as Tom and Helen August)	November 23, 1967
Aunt Clara unexpectedly drops in on Thanksgiving. Clara reminisces about being at the first Thanksgiving and would like to go back. Gladys comes by and lets herself in through the back door. Aunt Clara accidentally sends herself, Darrin, Sam, Tabatha and Gladys to 17th century Plymouth, Massachusetts. Luckily Gladys believes it's all a dream. Sam changes their clothes and hair so they fit in. As Aunt Clara tries to remember the incantation to get them back, the others get caught up in celebrating the first Thanksgiving with the likes of Miles Standish and John Alden (Richard Bull). Darrin is concerned about the anti-witch talk among some of the men. One of the men witness Darrin start a fire with a match and calls him a witch. Darrin is put on trial. He tries to explain about the match, but it does not help. Sam comes to Darrin's defense with simple logic. Phineas (Jacques Aubuchon) still has his doubts. Sam has Phineas strike the match and it lights. John Alden says that Phineas must declare himself a witch or drop the charges against Darrin. Just then, Clara remembers the spell and brings them back. While having dinner, Clara talks about taking Tabatha to the North Pole for Christmas. Laurie Main as Francis. Note: Filmed September 21, 1967.
120	13	"Solid Gold Mother-in-Law"	R. Robert Rosenbaum	Robert Riley Crutcher	November 30, 1967
Endora is babysitting Tabatha. Samantha comes home and finds Tabatha riding a pony. Endora tells Sam that the pony is Darrin. Endora changes Darrin back. A furious Darrin tells Sam that either Endora goes and never comes back or he does. Endora then puts an indestructible picture of herself on his desk at work. No matter how Darrin tries to get rid of it, the picture comes back. Larry brings in potential new client Mr. Gregson (Jack Collins) of Gregson Home Appliances. Gregson sees the picture. When Darrin says it's his mother-in-law, Gregson figures Darrin must have the perfect American home. After Gregson tells Darrin he would like to meet Endora, Larry forces Darrin to have a dinner party. That night, Endora promises to be good. Larry, Louise and Gregson arrive. Larry and Louise get into a fight when he lies about being close to Louise's mother. Gregson does not like what he saw and he offers Darrin an agency of his own. This now causes a major rift between Larry and Darrin. With Samantha's help, Larry and Darrin are friends again and they win the Gregson account. Sam sees Tabatha on another pony and thinks it's Darrin again, but then Darrin comes home. Notes: Filmed September 8, 1967.; Mr. Gregson is listed as Mr. Hudson in the credits.
121	14	"My, What Big Ears You Have"	Richard Kinon	Ed Jurist	December 7, 1967
On the phone, Samantha tells Louise about a rocking chair she saw at an antiques show. Endora pops in and her and Darrin start bickering. Darrin gets a call from Alice Swanton (Joan Hotchkis), an antiques dealer. She tells him that the rocking chair Sam looked at is available. Something Darrin says at the end of the call leads Endora to believe he is cheating on Sam. Sam heard it as well, but says she trusts Darrin. Endora places a spell on Darrin, making his ears grow every time he tells a lie. Not wanting to ruin the surprise, Darrin lies about who was on the phone and his ears grow. Outside the house, Gladys sees Darrin's ears. He asks her if he could have Sam's surprise delivered to her house. Darrin goes to pay Alice. Hazel Carter (Myra De Groot), an acquaintance, sees the two together. He lies about who Alice is and Hazel sees his ears get bigger. Darrin sees himself in a mirror. Hazel tells Sam about the woman and Darrin's ears. Darrin lies to Sam about where he was and the ears get bigger. Larry brings potential client Mr. Grayson (Thomas Browne Henry) by the house. Darrin finds a way to cover his ears. Sam feels bad when Darrin has to explain the lies and ruin his surprise. Endora does not believe him. What Darrin does not know is that the wrong box was delivered to Gladys' house. Things do get straightened out and Endora finds out about the chair and takes the spell off Darrin. Note: Filmed September 28, 1967.
122	15	"I Get Your Nannie, You Get My Goat"	William Asher	Ron Friedman	December 14, 1967
Darrin and Samantha are going to a ball to meet the head of Chappell Baby Foods, a potential client. Sam says that Endora was not available to babysit so she got her childhood English nanny, Elspeth (Hermione Baddeley). Elspeth arrives and mentions something about living there. Endora shows up and thinks she is being replaced. Darrin and Endora exchange words and Elspeth comes to Darrin's defense. Darrin says that Elspeth stays until he says so. At the ball, Endora and Elspeth's former employer, Lord Clive Montdrako (Reginald Gardiner), confront Sam and Darrin. Montdrako wants Elspeth back. Montdrako puts a rose between Darrin's teeth that will not come out. Larry wants to introduce Roy Chappell (Bern Hoffman) to Darrin. Mr. Chappell is surprised to see the rose. The next day at the office, Montdrako confronts Darrin again. Darrin says that Elspeth quit working for Montdrako, but he says Darrin stole her away from him. Montdrako says Darrin is not acting like a man and puts Darrin in a little Lord Fauntleroy outfit. Larry and Chappell walk in. Back at the house, Elspeth still refuses to return to Montdrako. Montdrako transfers Darrin into a mirror. Samantha figures out a way to please Montdrako, free Darrin and allow Elspeth to stay. Elspeth finds a way for Darrin to win Chappell's account. Note: Filmed July 15, 1967.
123	16	"Humbug Not to Be Spoken Here"	William Asher	Lila Garrett & Bernie Kahn	December 21, 1967
Samantha is using magic to help her decide where to put the Christmas tree. Prospective client Jessie Mortimer (Charles Lane), of Mortimer Instant Soup, wants to see Larry and Darrin's campaign that night. Despite it being Christmas Eve, Mortimer insists they come to his house. Darrin leaves Mortimer's house before they were finished. At home, Sam and Darrin are decorating the tree. Larry and Mortimer come by the house wanting to continue the meeting. When Darrin refuses to be intimidated, Mortimer will take his business elsewhere. Sam wonders why Mortimer does not care about Christmas. Sam decides to reform the modern-day Scrooge with a visit to Santa's workshop. Sam introduces Mortimer to Santa Claus (Don Beddoe). When Mortimer thinks it's just a trick, Santa realizes Sam brought him a non-believer. Santa takes Sam and Mortimer on some deliveries. They then take Mortimer home. The next morning, Darrin is pretending to be Santa for Tabatha. Tabatha knows it's Darrin. Larry comes by dressed as Santa. Mortimer then comes by with a present and an apology. Sam invites him to stay for Christmas. Something else happens that causes Mortimer to have a change of heart about the holidays. Note: Filmed October 5, 1967.
124	17	"Samantha's Da Vinci Dilemma"	Richard Kinon	Jerry Mayer & Paul L. Friedman	December 28, 1967
Samantha is doing some painting on the outside of the house. Aunt Clara drops by. When Aunt Clara tries to conjures up a house painter to help Sam, she actually gets Leonardo da Vinci (John Abbott). Clara tries to send da Vinci back, but winds up switching his clothes with Darrin's. Darrin was supposed to meet with Larry and client J.P. Pritchfield, but he races home instead. Sam tells Darrin what Clara did and Sam switches Darrin's clothes back. They then find Leonardo is missing. Leonardo winds up in an art museum. He starts chiseling on a stone artwork. A Museum Guard (Vince Howard) tries to stop him. Sam shows up, restores the stone and zaps Leonardo back home. Larry and J.P. Pritchfield arrive at the house. Pritchfield wants to use the Mona Lisa as the centerpiece of a new campaign for his toothpaste. Darrin does not like the idea and tries to talk Pritchfield out of it. Pritchfield decides to go to a different ad agency. With Leonardo's help, Darrin presents a better idea and Pritchfield loves it. Aunt Clara remembers the spell to send Leonardo back, but he will do a painting of her first. Note: Filmed October 20, 1967.
125	18	"Once in a Vial"	Bruce Bilson	Story by : James S. Henerson; Teleplay by : James S. Henerson & Ed Jurist	January 4, 1968
Endora pops in and tells Samantha that she ran into Sam's former boyfriend Rollo (Ron Randell) while in Paris. Endora summons Rollo hoping he could drive a wedge between Sam and Darrin. Endora takes Sam out to lunch and then Rollo pops in. Sam zaps herself back home. Sam and Endora wind up back at the restaurant and Darrin and client perfumer Bo Callahan (Arch Johnson) show up. Endora finds Callahan quite obnoxious. Callahan invites himself to Darrin's for dinner. That night, Endora brings Rollo. Friends Bill (Henry Beckman) and Harriet Walters (Joan Tompkins) are there. Callahan would like to use Endora in a perfume ad. Rollo keeps making plays for Sam, but she puts him off. Rollo puts a love potion in Sam's drink, but Endora accidentally drinks it and falls for Callahan. Sam figures out what Rollo did. Bill then takes a sip from the glass and he chases his wife around the house. Sam learns that Endora and Callahan have left. Rollo tells Sam the potion only lasts an hour. Endora and Callahan wind up at a Justice of the Peace wanting to get married. Rollo finds out what Endora is doing and tells Sam. Sam manages to stall for time and the spell wears off. Note: Filmed November 9, 1967.
126	19	"Snob in the Grass"	R. Robert Rosenbaum	Ed Jurist	January 11, 1968
Darrin has been working late nights the past week. Endora suggests to Samantha that it might not be work that's keeping him busy. Darrin calls and says that he and Larry will be having dinner with a potential client that evening. Sam tells Endora she trusts Darrin. Larry and Darrin are in the restaurant when Darrin's former girlfriend Sheila Sommers (Nancy Kovack) shows up. Larry wants to gain a new account with her father, J. P. Sommers (Frank Wilcox). Sheila is clearly still interested in Darrin, which makes him uncomfortable. Larry leaves the two of them alone. Sheila invites Darrin to a dinner party the next evening to meet her father. Endora comes by and catches Sheila flirting with Darrin. When Samantha finds out about Darrin seeing Sheila again, even if it is for business, she is initially angry. Sam finds out they were invited to the dinner party and thinks it could be interesting to go. Sam flashes back to when she first met Sheila and how Sheila talked down to her. Sam and Darrin arrive at the party. Sam and Sheila trade snide comments with each other. Having had enough, Sam uses witchcraft to play some pranks on Sheila. They do not get the Sommers account, but thanks to Sam they get another important account. Note: Filmed July 10, 1967.
127	20	"If They Never Met"	R. Robert Rosenbaum	Bill Idelson & Sam Bobrick	January 25, 1968
Samantha is upset with Endora because she buried Darrin under a ton of shaving cream. They had an argument because Endora brought Tabatha a unicorn as a gift. Darrin comes home early. He tells Sam that because of another one of Endora's pranks, he lost a large account and Larry fired him. Sam and Darrin get into a fight. Sam says that maybe he would be happier if they had never met. He agrees and then suddenly disappears. Endora sent Darrin to an alternate time where he does not know Sam. Endora and Sam go visit the other time and Darrin seems quite happy. Darrin is about to be made a partner of McMann & Tate. Sheila Sommers comes in the office and Sam learns they are going to get married. Sam still does not believe Darrin is really happier. At a cocktail party that night, J.P. Sommers wishes his daughter and Darrin a long and happy marriage. At a bar, Darrin is talking to his friend Dave. Darrin says he is not sure he loves Sheila. Sam arranges to bump into Darrin. Darrin apologizes and buys Sam a drink. He talks about getting married soon and that maybe he has been looking for something else. Darrin tells Sam to stay put because he has something to undo. Sam realizes that he is not happier without her. Back in real time, Sam makes Endora bring Darrin back and everything is alright. Notes: Filmed June 20, 1967.; Three rarely recurring characters from the pilot all appear for the final time in this episode: Nancy Kovack makes her third and last appearance as Sheila Sommers; Gene Blakeley makes his eighth and last appearance as Darrin's drinking buddy Dave; and Paul Barselow makes his ninth and last appearance as the bartender, here named Al.
128	21	"Hippie, Hippie, Hooray"	William Asher	Michael Morris	February 1, 1968
Samantha sees Cousin Serena's picture on the front page of the newspaper. Serena is dressed as a blonde hippie and was arrested at a love-in. Sam hides the picture from Darrin. Larry and Louise see the paper and think that it is Sam in the photograph. At the office, Larry invites himself and Louise over to Darrin's house. Back at home, Serena is there and Darrin finds out about the arrest and the picture in the paper. Now he knows why Larry was so interested in how Sam was doing. Darrin is very rude to Serena and tells her to leave. Larry and Louise arrive. Larry sees the same guitar in the living room that Serena had in the picture. Darrin turns on the TV and there is a news story that shows Serena. Darrin tells Larry that she was Sam's cousin, Serena. The next day at the office, Larry introduces Darrin to conservative client Mr. Giddings (Walter Sande). Serena shows up and pretends to be "hippie" Samantha. The only way that Darrin can prove to Larry that the woman he saw was Serena is to provide both Sam and Serena together. Larry and Louise come to the house. Because Sam could not get a hold of Serena, Sam tries to double as both of them. Things get complicated when Sam has to keep switching back and forth, and Larry gets suspicious. After an apology from Darrin, Serena shows up. Notes: Filmed October 12, 1967.; Ralph Story appears as News Reporter Bud Le Beau.; Samantha (pretending to be Serena) sings "The Iffen Song", which is also played during the end credits.; The kitchen set from I Dream Of Jeannie is used as the Tates' kitchen.
129	22	"A Prince of a Guy"	R. Robert Rosenbaum	Ed Jurist	February 8, 1968 †
Darrin is on a business trip. Samantha is reading Sleeping Beauty to Tabatha as a bed time story. After Sam leaves the room, Tabatha zaps Prince Charming (William Bassett) out of the book. Sam is having a dinner party with the Tates and Darrin's cousin Helen, who has not arrived yet. Endora suddenly shows up and wants Sam to see something. Helen and her current boyfriend Ralph (Stuart Margolin) show up. Upstairs, Endora shows Sam what Tabatha did. Tabatha is having problems zapping the Prince back into the book. Helen comes up to Tabatha's room and is immediately smitten with the Prince. Sam passes him off as her cousin Charlie. "Charlie" is quite the flatterer and Louise is taken with him as well. Helen spends time with Charlie and Ralph leaves. The next morning, Darrin calls and says he will be home that night. Larry comes by and tells Sam that Charlie would be perfect for an advertising campaign. Larry has set up an audition for this morning. Helen comes by wanting to see Charlie. Endora tells Sam that Charlie cannot be photographed as he has no substance. At the studio, Sam tries to stop Larry from putting Charlie in front of a camera. Endora tells Sam that the Prince cannot be sent back unless he wants to be and he does not. Helen and Ralph get back together after he mentions marriage. With the help of Sleeping Beauty, Sam gets the Prince to want to go back. Notes: Filmed December 11, 1967.; Dick York does not appear in this episode.
130	23	"McTavish"	Paul Davis	James S. Henerson	February 15, 1968
Aunt Clara comes by and asks Samantha's help in getting rid of a ghost. Clara's old boyfriend Ockie (Reginald Owen) has purchased an old castle in England. He just opened it as a tourist hotel. The resident ghost, McTavish (Ronald Long), is frightening the guests. Sam tells Clara that witches have no power over ghosts. Sam reluctantly agrees to go talk to McTavish and pops over to the castle. Darrin comes home early and Clara has to explain where Sam is. What Sam does not know is that Darrin's parents are visiting the castle. Phyllis sees Sam down the hall. Frank does not believe her. Phyllis calls Darrin, who says Sam is home and asleep. Sam is able to convince McTavish to move to more comfortable place. Just then, Phyllis walks into the room and sees Sam. Sam and McTavish both zap away leaving a screaming Phyllis. McTavish decides to stay at Sam and Darrin's house. The next day Darrin gets a call from Phyllis who says they flew back and she wants to come and see Sam. Ockie comes to see Sam and says McTavish is the main attraction of the castle and the guests want him back. Ockie and McTavish do a little negotiating and come to an agreement. Sam sends them away just as Frank and Phyllis show up. Frank now proves to Phyllis that she was seeing things in the castle. Note: Filmed October 27, 1967.
131	24	"How Green Was My Grass"	R. Robert Rosenbaum	Ed Jurist	February 29, 1968
Samantha is taking Tabatha to doctor. While she is gone, an artificial lawn is mistakenly installed in the front yard. Sam comes home but is too busy with Tabatha to notice the lawn. Meanwhile, neighbor Bill MacLane (Richard X. Slattery) has been waiting hours for the artificial lawn company to show up. Darrin comes home early and gets very upset because he thinks Samantha zapped the lawn there. When Sam denies having anything to do with the lawn, they get into an argument that lasts the rest of the day. Sam zaps the lawn away. The next morning the Driver (Joseph V. Perry) from the lawn company and his Helper (Andy Romano) come by. They want to know what happened to the grass. Darrin tells them to come back later. Sam tries to put it back but the spell does not work. They learn that Endora removed Sam's ability to bring it back because of the way Darrin treated her. MacLane comes by and asks Darrin what happened to his grass. Sam uses witchcraft to protect Darrin when MacLane takes a swing at him. Darrin has Sam put a new artificial lawn on MacLane's property, but it turns out to be real grass. Before Sam can do anything, MacLane comes out and sees the lawn. Barbara Perry as Elvira MacLane. Craig Huxley as Boy At Door. Notes: Filmed November 2, 1967.; The Stephenses' house number is changed from 1164 to 192.
132	25	"To Twitch or Not to Twitch"	William Asher	Lila Garrett & Bernie Kahn	March 14, 1968
Darrin and Samantha are going to a formal dinner party. Sam is nowhere near ready so she uses witchcraft to speed things up. Darrin catches her and is not happy. On the drive there, it starts to rain. Darrin tells Sam that he does not want her to use witchcraft under any circumstance. Just then the car gets a flat tire. Darrin decides Sam could make an exception this time, but she refuses. Darrin must now change the tire in the pouring rain. They arrive at the home of potential new client, Dwight Sharpe (Arthur Julian). Things get awkward when Darrin has to change into some of Dwight's clothes. Darrin makes an inappropriate comment to Dwight and the evening is a disaster. Back at home, Samantha storms off to mother with Tabatha. At the office, Dwight comes by and he and Darrin apologize to each other. Dwight invites them over for another dinner party that evening. Darrin tries to make an excuse why he and Sam cannot make it. Larry insists they show up. At home, Darrin apologizes and Sam comes back. Despite Darrin not wanting to, Sam makes sure they go to the Sharpes' to patch things up. On the way there, the car starts to run out of gas. Sam makes it so Darrin can get some gas. Note: Filmed February 5, 1968.
133	26	"Playmates"	William Asher	Richard Baer	March 21, 1968 †
Samantha and Tabatha are preparing for a visit from Darrin's mother, Phyllis. Phyllis thinks Sam is an overprotective mother by not exposing Tabatha to other children. Phyllis tells Sam that a friend of hers, Gretchen Millhauser (Peggy Pope), has just moved into town. Gretchen has a 5-year-old son, Michael (Teddy Quinn). Phyllis arranged for Sam and Tabatha to meet them. When they get to Gretchen's house, it's clear that she lets Michael do whatever he wants. Because Michael is a spoiled brat and a bully, Tabatha turns him into a bulldog. Gretchen sees the dog and notices that Michael is missing. Gretchen and Phyllis search the house for Michael and the dog follows Gretchen. Sam tries to get the dog alone with Tabatha so that she can turn him back into Michael. But the dog runs off and Sam goes after it. Sam uses some magic to catch the dog. Tabatha changes Michael back. When Gretchen asks him where he was, he says he was a dog. Gretchen believes that she is being too permissive with Michael and she decides to discipline him more. Back at home, Tabatha makes her toy bunny hop around the house. Sam has to make sure Phyllis does not see it. Notes: Filmed January 18, 1968.; Dick York does not appear in this episode.
134	27	"Tabatha's Cranky Spell"	William Asher	Robert Riley Crutcher	March 28, 1968 †
Darrin is out of town on business. Despite Samantha telling her not to, Tabatha has been doing a lot of witchcraft. Larry and Louise invite Samantha over for dinner. They refuse to take no for an answer, saying they will send their own babysitter, Louise's Aunt Harriet, to sit with Tabatha. Larry comes by with Aunt Harriet. Sam learns that Harriet uses a crystal ball and thinks she can contact the after world. Larry tells Sam she cannot back out as they are also entertaining existing client Edgar Baker (J. Edward McKinley) and his wife Agnes (Sara Seegar). At the dinner party, the wives try to convince Baker to update his product's packaging. Meanwhile, Tabatha's witchcraft causes Aunt Harriet to believe she is contacted the spirit world. The dinner party moves to Sam's house so that they can all see the ghost Aunt Harriet supposedly conjured up. Agnes is all excited because she believes in the afterlife. Tabatha's magic confirms Agnes' belief and she would like Harriet to conjure up Edgar's Uncle Willie (Harry Harvey Sr.). Baker believes this is all nonsense and pulls his account. Sam thinks she has a way to get the account back. She brings Harriet's crystal ball over to Agnes. Agnes tries to reach Uncle Willie. With the help of the real ghost of Uncle Willie, Sam gets Baker to agree to give the account back to Larry and update his product. Notes: Filmed December 4, 1967.; Actress Nellie Burt's character is called "Aunt Harriet" but credited as "Aunt Emma".; Dick York does not appear.
135	28	"I Confess"	Seymour Robbie	Richard Baer	April 4, 1968
Samantha and Darrin are just leaving a restaurant. Sam forgot her gloves and Darrin goes to get them. A Drunk (Dick Wilson) tries to make a pass at Sam and she uses witchcraft to stop him. Darrin finds out that Sam used magic and is not happy about it. Back at home, Darrin, in a fit of frustration and anger, says that they should tell everyone about Sam being a witch. She makes him dream about that very situation and the reactions of their friends. In the dream, Sam and Darrin go to see Larry and tell him Sam's a witch. At first he does not believe them until Sam performs some magic in front of him. Larry then says with his brains and her magic, they could rule the world. Sam and Darrin then tell the Kravitz's. When Sam proves it, Abner and Gladys are frightened. The whole world knows Sam's a witch and Abner is selling tickets to the crowds gathered outside the house. The phone rings constantly with people requesting magic from Sam. Darrin cannot get a job because everyone wants magic from Sam as part of the deal. Gen. Stanton (Woodrow Parfrey) and Agent W (Herb Ellis), from the Government, come by. They want Sam to use her powers to defend the country. Sam, Darrin and Tabatha are put in a secluded military installation. Darrin wakes up from the dream. The next morning, Darrin decides they should leave things the way they are. Notes: Filmed February 12, 1968.; This episode was pre-empted during the initial broadcast run to announce the assassination of Martin Luther King Jr.
136	29	"A Majority of Two"	R. Robert Rosenbaum	Ed Jurist	April 11, 1968 †
Darrin is out of town for a week. Aunt Clara comes by and tells Samantha that her and boyfriend Ockie have broken up again. Larry tells Sam that Japanese businessman Kenzu Mishimoto (Richard Haydn), who's account he has been trying to get for months, is coming to town. Larry hints at Sam entertaining him and she agrees. That night, Aunt Clara zaps kimonos on her and Sam just as Larry and Kenzu arrive. Kenzu becomes enamored with Clara, who reminds him of his deceased wife. Because Kenzu will be leaving in a couple days, Larry would like to talk business, but Kenzu is only interested in Clara. The next few days Clara and Kenzu spend a lot of time together. Sam manages to get Ockie to call Clara and they get back together. Sam tells Kenzu about Clara and he now wants to leave without striking a deal with Larry. Sam tells Larry they must find a way for Mishimoto to "save face". Sam meets Kenzu at the airport. Something Sam says, and with the help of a beautiful Stewardess, Kenzu decides to stay in town. Notes: Filmed February 6, 1968.; Dick York does not appear in this episode.
137	30	"Samantha's Secret Saucer"	Richard Michaels	Jerry Mayer & Paul L. Friedman	April 18, 1968
Aunt Clara accidentally turns Tabatha's toy flying saucer into a large real one. What Clara does not know is that inside are alien canines Orvis (Steve Franken) and Alpha (Hamilton Camp). Samantha and Darrin return and tell Aunt Clara to shrink the saucer back to size. Clara says she tried but it did not work. The next morning Gladys sees the saucer and calls the Air Force. Gladys brings officers Colonel Burkett (Larry D. Mann) and Captain Tugwell (Eldon Quick) to the house. Sam and Darrin are able to explain that the saucer is a prop that Darrin has built for an advertising campaign. Orvis and Alpha have been watching. Darrin and Sam see Orvis and Alpha coming out of the saucer, but the aliens are frightened back in. Sam zaps into the saucer and invites the aliens to come in the house. Orvis and Alpha are friendly aliens who end up trusting the Stephenses, and who just want to go home. Captain Tugwell comes back and tells Gladys that their radar did pick something up last night. Tugwell and Gladys look through a window and see the aliens. Tugwell goes to get Col. Burkett. Gladys confronts Darrin and the aliens and Alpha shoots her with a niceness ray gun. Darrin tells Gladys that Orvis and Alpha are actors. With the help of Tabatha, Aunt Clara is able to send the aliens and their saucer back home before Col. Burkett arrives. Notes: Filmed February 19, 1968.; This is the last episode to feature Marion Lorne as Aunt Clara; Lorne died May 9, 1968.
138	31	"The No-Harm Charm"	Russell B. Mayberry	Ed Jurist	April 25, 1968
Darrin is waiting to hear the news that he will be made a partner in the agency. Instead, Darrin is almost fired over a major mistake in a campaign for Omega National Bank. Larry suggests that Darrin take some time off. Darrin thinks that Endora had something to do with it. Uncle Arthur (Paul Lynde) convinces Darrin that a lucky charm will protect him from witchcraft and all types of harm. Darrin is skeptical until Arthur proves its powers. Darrin thanks Arthur and heads back to the office. Samantha knows there is no such thing as a lucky charm. Uncle Arthur gave Darrin the "charm" solely to boost his confidence, which it did. Sam is worried that Darrin could get in trouble and decides to keep an eye on him all day. Darrin has an idea how to save the Omega account. Darrin goes to see Mr. Markham (Vaughn Taylor), the bank president. Markham is not impressed with Darrin's idea. A Bank Messenger (Paul Smith) comes by with some papers. The Messenger turns out to be a bank robber and pulls a gun on Markham. Because he believes nothing can happen to him, Darrin manages to get the gun away from the robber. Markham decides to give the account back. When Sam tells Darrin the charm was not real, he faints. Susan Tolsky as Secretary. Note: Filmed February 26, 1968.
139	32	"Man of the Year"	R. Robert Rosenbaum	John L. Greene	May 2, 1968
Darrin has been named one of the Advertising Men of the Year by the Huxter's Club. Darrin tells Samantha that it is not that big of a deal. While Darrin goes to change for a night out with Sam, Endora pops in. She thinks Darrin is full of false modesty. Endora casts a circle of persuasive charm around Darrin. No matter what Darrin says, anyone that is near him will like what he said. At the office, potential client O.J. Slocum (George Ives) is about to leave. When he gets near Darrin, he likes what Darrin has to say. Larry's partner, Mr. McMann (Roland Winters), believes Darrin is a rising star. Sam and Darrin are at a cocktail party given for him to celebrate the award. Everyone is so enamored with Darrin's ideas that he begins to have delusions of grandeur. Sam is not impressed with Darrin's suggestions. But she sees the reaction of those around him and she starts to figure out what's going on. When they get home, Darrin is upset because Sam does not appreciate his new found glory. Sam explains that Endora cast a spell on him and gets her to remove it. Darrin is disappointed that he is not as brilliant as he started to believe he was. With Sam's help, he gets things straightened out with his clients. C. Lindsay Workman as Mr. Angel. Bill Quinn as Charles Gilbert. Byron Morrow as Mr. Ramser. Note: Filmed March 1, 1968.
140	33	"Splitsville"	William Asher	Richard Baer	May 16, 1968
One night, Samantha sees Gladys standing outside in her night clothes trying to hitchhike. Gladys tells Sam that she is leaving Abner. She will stay at a hotel and then go to Mexico for a quickie divorce. Sam suggests Gladys stay in her guest room. The next morning Sam and Darrin learn that the reason for the fight was Gladys' health food regimen. Darrin comes home from work and finds out Gladys is still there and they will be having health food for dinner. After dinner, Darrin wants Sam to go and talk to Abner. Abner is having a great time playing poker with his buddies. As time passes, Gladys does not seem eager to leave, and Abner seems happy without his wife. Darrin allows Samantha to use a little witchcraft to bring the Kravitzes back together. Sam gets local butcher Leon Hogersdorf (Arthur Julian) to romance Gladys and hopefully make Abner jealous. Leon comes by the house and brings Gladys flowers. Sam then uses magic to get Abner to come over. It takes a little work, but Sam gets Gladys and Abner to know they still love each other. Note: Filmed March 8, 1968.

=== Season 5 (1968–69) ===
No. overall	No. in season	Title	Directed by	Written by	Original release date
141	1	"Samantha's Wedding Present"	William Asher	Bernard Slade	September 26, 1968
Endora comes by and tells Samantha that she is willing to get along with Darrin. It's Sam's fifth wedding anniversary and Endora brought a belated wedding gift. Darrin comes by and is not happy about Endora's witchcraft gift. Endora gets upset and calls Darrin a small man and leaves. At the office, Larry mentions that Darrin looks shorter than he used to be. What Darrin does not yet know is that Endora put a spell on him causing him to shrink. Darrin arrives at home and Gladys sees him the size of a little boy. Sam suggests that he apologize to Endora, but Darrin believes he was in the right. The next day Darrin is as tall as a coffee cup. Gladys and Abner come by under the pretense of looking for their dog. The dog gets into the kitchen and chases Darrin outside. Darrin winds up in an empty can that is taken away by trash collectors. Endora agrees to change Darrin back, but they do not know where he is. Darrin winds up at a trash dump. A drunk, Frank O'Hara (Dick Wilson), finds Darrin and mistakes him for a leprechaun. Darrin gets Frank to bring him home. Frank will not turn Darrin over to Sam until he gets his three wishes. Sam grants his wishes. Something Frank says about gifts makes Darrin reflect on how he acted towards Endora. He apologizes to Endora and she removes the spell. Art Metrano as Ass't. Trash Collector. Notes: Filmed August 2, 1968.; Reworking of the I Dream of Jeannie episode "My Incredible Shrinking Master" (March 6, 1967).
142	2	"Samantha Goes South for a Spell"	William Asher	Ed Jurist	October 3, 1968
Serena comes to Samantha's house and learns that Sam and Tabatha have gone to the store. Darrin is home so Serena makes herself look like Sam. Serena kisses Darrin just as Sam comes home. Serena brought with her a black crow. The crow turns out to be Malcom, who Serena had been seeing. Serena broke off their relationship when she found out he was married. Brunhilde, the jealous witch-wife of Malcom's, arrives. Thinking Sam is Serena, she sends Sam back to New Orleans in the year 1868, where she cannot remember who she is. Aunt Jenny (Isabel Sanford) finds Sam lost and takes her to Rance Butler's (Jack Cassidy) mansion. Serena then sends Darrin back to rescue his wife, who must give him a willing kiss to break the spell. This task will not be easy for Darrin, because Sam will not know who he is. Meanwhile, Rance has fallen for Sam and wants to marry her. Darrin shows up at the mansion. He tries to tell Rance that Sam is his wife, but Rance kicks him out. That night, Darrin sneaks into Sam's room, but is caught by Rance. Rance challenges Darrin to a sword fight. For some reason, Sam feels sorry for Darrin and kisses him. They both disappear in front of Rance and Aunt Jenny's eyes. Back at the present, Sam puts a spell on Darrin so he thinks the whole thing was a dream. But he does figure some of it out. Note: Filmed June 27, 1968.
143	3	"Samantha on the Keyboard"	Richard Michaels	Richard Baer	October 10, 1968
Endora gives Tabitha a miniature piano and makes her a piano virtuoso. Darrin is furious. Endora takes the spell off of Tabitha and leaves with the piano. Darrin would like Samantha to set a good example for Tabitha. Darrin challenges Sam to learn the piano the mortal way and she accepts. Snobbish piano instructor Johann Sebastian Monroe (Jonathan Harris) arrives for Sam's lesson. It's another day and Endora gives Tabitha her talent again. Monroe comes by and hears Tabitha playing. Monroe is so impressed that he wants to put Tabitha on a concert tour, but Darrin and Sam say no. Worried that Monroe will continue to bother them, Darrin tells Sam they need to find a way to dissuade him. Sam suggests they find another child prodigy. Darrin allows Sam to use magic to find a talented child. Sam finds a little boy named Mathew who is very talented. He is the son of Robert Williams, a school janitor. Monroe comes by again and brings with him Maestro Alfredo Ferranini (Fritz Feld). Ferranini came to hear Tabitha, who winds up just banging on the piano. Ferranini leaves quite upset. Sam tells Monroe about Mathew. Notes: Filmed July 18, 1968.; Later retold with a figure-skating theme built around ABC's coverage of the Sapporo Winter Olympics in the season 8 episode "Samantha on Thin Ice", broadcast January 29, 1972.; This is the first episode to feature the spelling "Tabitha" in the closing credits.
144	4	"Darrin, Gone and Forgotten"	William Asher	Lila Garrett & Bernie Kahn	October 17, 1968
Samantha and Darrin are about to have an after dinner drink, when Darrin suddenly disappears. Sam summons Endora figuring she had something to do with it. After Endora denies knowing where Darrin is, witch Carlotta (Mercedes McCambridge) shows up. Carlotta reminds Endora that she promised long ago that Samantha would be married to her son Juke (Steve Franken). Carlotta is holding Darrin captive. Sam goes to meet Juke, who is dressed as a little boy. Juke turns out to be a spineless warlock who has never stood up to his mother. He does not even really want to marry Sam. Sam tries to get Juke to be firm with his mother, but it does not work. Sam tells Endora that Carlotta must have a vulnerability. Carlotta and Juke show up at Sam's house. Carlotta threatens to harm Darrin. Sam pretends to agree to marry Juke. Sam then says as Juke's wife, she has a say in how he will dress and act. Carlotta does not like to see Juke changed, so she calls off the wedding. Juke is a little more assertive with his mother and they leave. Darrin is returned not remembering anything. Notes: Filmed July 3, 1968.; Dick York appears only briefly.
145	5	"It's So Nice to Have a Spouse Around the House"	William Asher	Barbara Avedon	October 24, 1968
Endora tells Samantha that the Witches Council demands that she make an appearance. Sam refuses and the Council turns Darrin into a bronze statue. When Sam says she will go, Darrin is changed back. Sam tells Darrin about the Council meeting and he objects. Sam convinces Serena to masquerade as her in front of Darrin for the afternoon. Serena turns herself into Sam and Samantha leaves. Tabitha knows that it's really Serena and Endora takes Tabitha to the zoo. Later, Darrin and Larry are having a drink and Darrin feels bad about how he acted towards Sam. Larry suggests that Darrin take Sam on a second honeymoon. Darrin takes Serena for a weekend at the Moonthatch Inn, the location of his and Sam's honeymoon. Madame Wageir (Fifi D'Orsay), the owner of the Inn, greets the two. Meanwhile, Sam returns home and finds no one there. Serena has a problem because Darrin is getting in a honeymoon romantic mood. Serena tries to stifle Darrin's advances and he thinks she is still mad at him. Darrin and Serena return home. When Darrin goes to check on Tabitha, Serena tells Sam what happened. Tabitha tells Darrin that Serena was here and Darrin figures things out. To teach Sam a lesson, he implies that they had a romantic time together. Sam learns that Darrin knows about the Council meeting. Note: Filmed July 25, 1968.
146	6	"Mirror, Mirror on the Wall"	Richard Michaels	Lila Garrett & Bernie Kahn	November 7, 1968
Darrin thinks he is showing some signs of aging. He is worried about coming up with ideas that will appeal to a younger market. Endora thinks he is just being vain. Without Samantha nor Darrin knowing, she casts a spell to make him obsessed with his appearance. Meanwhile, Larry is talking with staunchly conservative client, Whitney Hascomb (Herb Voland) of Hascomb Pharmaceuticals. Hascomb is only creating a new suntan lotion on the insistence of his wife Emily (Sara Seegar). Darrin comes in wearing a turtleneck shirt and love beads. Darrin keeps looking at his reflection in things. Darrin is to have cocktails with Hascomb later, so he buys some very mod-style clothes. Sam figures out that Endora has placed a spell on Darrin. Darrin goes to see Larry and Hascomb. Sam cannot get Endora to remove the spell, so she uses her magic to changes Darrin's clothes. Darrin comes home and tells Sam that the meeting was postponed until this evening and they will be going to Larry's. Darrin puts on some more mod clothes and fake sideburns. Sam decides to zap up some flashy mod clothes for herself. They show up to Larry's and Hascomb is about to leave. Sam comes up with a modern pitch for the suntan lotion. Emily loves the idea and as she is a majority shareholder in the company, she tells Whitney to give them the account. Sam tells Larry that's the reason Darrin dressed this way. Later, Sam gets Endora to remove the spell. Notes: Filmed August 8, 1968.; Elizabeth Montgomery's then-husband, Director-producer William Asher, makes a brief cameo appearance as an irate motorist.
147	7	"Samantha's French Pastry"	William Asher	Richard Baer	November 14, 1968
Samantha and Darrin are having Larry and Louise over for dinner. Uncle Arthur (Paul Lynde) comes by and ruins Sam's dessert. To make it up to her, Arthur wants to zap up some napoleon's. But he conjures up Napoleon Bonaparte (Henry Gibson) instead of the pastry. The Tates will be arriving soon, but Arthur is unable to send Napoleon back. Darrin irritates Arthur and he leaves. Sam is able to convince Napoleon to promise not to tell Larry and Louise who he really is. He will pretend to be Henri, her visiting cousin from Paris. Larry, believing Henri looks like Napoleon, wants to use him for an advertising campaign for Zoom Detergent. When told he will be seen all over the world, Napoleon agrees. The next morning Sam still cannot get a hold of Arthur. Larry arrives to take Napoleon to the commercial studio. Arthur comes by the studio to tell Sam he is still working on reversing the spell. H. L. Bradley (J. Edward McKinley), from the detergent company, does not like the way the rehearsal is going. Bradley wants to scrap the whole commercial. Back at the house, Arthur thinks he has the reverse spell, but it does not work. With Sam's help, Napoleon is sent back. Notes: Filmed September 6, 1968.; The plot device of meeting Napoleon Bonaparte was borrowed from the I Dream of Jeannie episode "My Master, Napoleon's Buddy" (April 3, 1967).
148	8	"Is It Magic or Imagination?"	Luther James	Arthur Julian	November 21, 1968
Samantha gets a call from Darrin's mother, Phyllis, who says she is in the neighborhood and is stopping by. Because Sam and Darrin never go anywhere, Phyllis thinks Sam should enter a slogan contest for Tinkerbell Disposable Diapers. First prize is a two week trip to Tahiti, all expenses paid. Sam does enter and winds up winning. Sam did not know that the company is a client of Darrin's. Darrin was working on a new campaign for them. Larry tells Darrin that the company will not use his ideas because of Sam's slogan. An angry Larry fires Darrin over the incident. Darrin comes home upset, but Sam says it was his mother's idea to enter. Darrin then accuses Samantha of using witchcraft to win the contest and they get into a fight. Larry comes by to apologize. Darrin wants to know why he now has his job back. Larry wants to give Sam a job in his slogan department. Darrin says he resigns and leaves the house. Darrin is talking to a man in the bar (Dick Wilson) about wives being witches. Sam goes to the bar and zaps Darrin back home. The next day, Darrin finds out that the company ran Sam's slogan through a computer analyzer and it was rejected. Darrin realizes Sam did not use magic and apologizes. Notes: Filmed August 22, 1968.; Remake of the Season 1 episode "Help, Help, Don't Save Me". Remade again in Season 8 as "A Good Turn Never Goes Unpunished".
149	9	"Samantha Fights City Hall"	Richard Michaels	Rick Mittleman	November 28, 1968
Samantha and Tabitha are at Willow Street Park, the only park in the neighborhood. A Surveyor (Vic Tayback) tells Sam that the park will close the next day. He says that a shopping center will be built on the land. Sam says that the park was dedicated to the city by a Colonel Nathan R. Mossler. When the city forgot to pay the lease, developer Harlan Mossler (Arch Johnson) took the land over. Sam decides to fight and organizes a protest to stop the bulldozers from getting in the park. Sam also uses a little magic to stop them. Mossler comes by and tells the ladies that he will get a court injunction to force them to move. Mossler goes to see Larry and Darrin and mentions the protest. Darrin knows Sam was there. That night, Darrin tries to talk Sam out of continuing the protest. Darrin then tells Sam that Mossler is a client of McMann & Tate, but Sam does not care. The next morning, Larry comes by and shows Darrin the newspaper with Sam's picture in it. Mossler calls and says he saw the paper and he wants an explanation. At the park, Sam says she will back down, but Darrin tells her to keep fighting. Sam gets the spirit of Grandfather Colonel Mossler to talk to Harlan through his statue. Harlan changes his mind about the shopping center. Nora Denney as Mrs. Gurney. Barbara Perry as Mrs. Bentley. Art Metrano as Bulldozer Driver #1. Notes: Filmed August 29, 1968.; Because Erin Murphy had the mumps, her fraternal twin sister Diane Murphy, who had stopped being used for the role the previous season, filled in as Tabitha.
150	10	"Samantha Loses Her Voice"	William Asher	Lila Garrett & Bernie Kahn	December 5, 1968
Uncle Arthur brings Tabitha a poodle. Just then a tearful Louise stops by. She had a fight with Larry and she never wants to see him again. Meanwhile, Larry and Darrin are having a drink at a bar and talking about the fight. While deciding whether to keep the poodle, Samantha says she cannot speak for Darrin. As a practical joke, Uncle Arthur exchanges Sam's voice with Darrin's. Darrin suddenly comes home with Sam's voice. Arthur is getting a big laugh out of all of this. Arthur has trouble returning the voices to normal. Larry then shows up. After he learns Louise is there, Larry fires Darrin and leaves. Arthur is able to give Darrin his voice back. But now Arthur has Sam's voice and she has his. Arthur is able to switch them back and he leaves with the poodle. Louise is about to leave. Sam and Darrin's voices switch again. Larry comes back and he and Louise make up. Arthur returns and is able to make the voices stick. But now Sam and Darrin are stuck holding hands. Darrin is able to straighten things out with Larry. Arthur separates Sam and Darrin after Darrin has some kind words for Arthur. Notes: Filmed October 4, 1968.; The plot device of voices being switched is borrowed from the I Dream of Jeannie episode "Haven't I Seen Me Someplace Before?" (March 26, 1968).
151	11	"I Don't Want to Be a Toad, I Want to Be a Butterfly"	Richard Michaels	Doug Tibbles	December 12, 1968
Darrin's mother Phyllis has come by with an early birthday present for Tabitha. Phyllis has enrolled Tabitha in a nursery school which will start the next day. Darrin and Sam do not think it's a good idea because they are afraid her witchcraft might cause trouble. Phyllis will not take no for an answer. The next day, Sam tells Darrin that she had a talk with Tabitha, but he is still worried. At Delightful Day Nursery School, Sam, Phyllis and Tabitha meet Mrs. Burch (Maudie Prickett), the woman in charge. Sam was hoping to stay with Tabitha, but Mrs. Burch says it's against the rules. Sam is dress shopping with Phyllis. She manages to zap over to the school to check on Tabitha. Sam sees Tabitha use magic to win at musical chairs. Mrs. Burch sees Sam and Sam leaves. The children are being various plants and animals for a nature play. Tabitha wants to stop classmate Amy Taylor from crying because she cannot be a butterfly. She turns Amy into an actual butterfly, who then flies out the window. Mrs. Burch begins searching for Amy. Sam zaps back and finds out what Tabitha did. Amy's mother, Ruth, shows up and Mrs. Burch tells her Amy is missing. Sam finds the butterfly and Tabitha changes Amy back. That night, Sam tells Darrin that the school is closing down. Art Metrano as Man in Yard. Paul Sorensen as Harve. Karl Lukas as Benny. Notes: Filmed September 27, 1968.; Prickett returns in a similar role as Tabitha's teacher, Mrs. Peabody, in two season 8 episodes.
152	12	"Weep No More My Willow"	William Asher	Michael Morris	December 19, 1968
Gladys had many neighbors sign a petition to have Samantha and Darrin chop down the sickly willow tree in their front yard. Sam refuses to do it as the tree was a gift from Darrin. Darrin drives beautiful new neighbor Elaine Hanson into the city. Gladys sees this. As Sam tried everything else, she calls on Dr. Bombay (Bernard Fox) to save her dying willow tree. Sam gets caught in the fallout of his spell and she then weeps uncontrollably with each passing breeze. While talking to Gladys, Sam gets caught in a breeze and starts crying. Sam tries to tell Gladys that she is just upset about her tree. Gladys thinks there's a problem between Sam and Darrin. Meanwhile, Darrin drops off Elaine and she gives him a kiss. Darrin does not know that Larry saw the kiss. Gladys calls Darrin at the office and accuses him of cheating on Sam. Darrin calls Sam and she happens to be crying. Larry overhears this and asks Darrin who the other woman is. Sam finally gets a hold of Dr. Bombay. When Dr. Bombay tries to reverse the spell, Sam laughs instead. Larry comes by and Sam is constantly laughing. Dr. Bombay eventually cures Samantha and says the tree will be cured shortly. A Lumberjack (Paul Sorensen) comes by with a court order to chop down the tree. Suddenly the tree is cured. Note: Filmed July 11, 1968.
153	13	"Instant Courtesy"	R. Robert Rosenbaum	Story by : Arthur Alsberg; Teleplay by : John L. Greene	December 26, 1968
Endora claims that Darrin is a slave driver when it comes to Samantha. Sam tells her that Darrin is actually courteous and considerate. Endora casts a spell on Darrin that makes him courteous to a fault. At the office, Larry notices Darrin being very kind and helpful to his secretary, Betty Wilson. Larry mentions that Adrienne Sebastian (Mala Powers) and her advertising manager, Charlie Traynor (Herb Voland), will be coming by to discuss the campaign for her Cosmetics Company. Darrin's courteousness does not fit in with the hard sell approach that Traynor wants. Adrienne, on the other hand, likes Darrin's suggestions. Larry is worried about the way Darrin is acting. Traynor has had enough and he and Adrienne leave. Larry tells Darrin to take a long vacation and maybe see a doctor. Larry basically just fired Darrin. Darrin comes home and Sam can tell that Endora put a spell on him. Sam has no luck getting Endora to show up. Adrienne comes by the house. She tells Darrin she liked his ideas and would like to set him up with his own agency. Sam makes Larry change his mind about Darrin. Sam gets Endora to reverse the spell. Larry comes by the house and apologizes. Adrienne comes by and when she sees Larry there, she thinks Larry firing Darrin was just a trick to get her account. Sam uses a little magic to get Adrienne to change her mind and give the men her account. Note: Filmed October 22, 1968.
154	14	"Samantha's Super Maid"	R. Robert Rosenbaum	Peggy Chantler Dick & Douglas Dick	January 2, 1969
Darrin's mother Phyllis invites herself over. Phyllis suggests Samantha get a maid hoping the extra time will allow Samantha to make social connections which will help Darrin's career. Phyllis says she already called the agency and several applicants will be coming by. First Mrs. Harper (Nora Marlowe) arrives. When she hears there's a baby in the house, she leaves. The next applicant is named Amelia (Nellie Burt). She is a sweet, hard working woman whom Sam has no choice but to hire. Sam and Darrin know they cannot have a maid because of the frequent witchcraft possibly being performed in the house. Neither has the heart to do the firing. Endora is surprised that Sam has a maid. To maybe help in getting rid of Amelia, Endora turns the house into a complete mess. Phyllis brings over Leslie Otis (Virginia Gregg). They see the messed up house. Sam makes an excuse for the mess and asks Phyllis and Leslie to stay for lunch. Sam uses a little magic to help Amelia clean the house. Amelia tells Sam how happy she is and that she plans to stay for a long time. When Leslie sees the quickly cleaned up house, she wants to hire Amelia. Amelia refuses until Sam works her magic. Notes: Filmed September 12, 1968.; Remake of Season 2 episode "Maid to Order".
155	15	"Cousin Serena Strikes Again (Part 1)"	Richard Michaels	Ed Jurist	January 9, 1969
During the night, Serena shows up at the house riding a motorcycle. She wants to stay all day, but Darrin tells her they will be entertaining a client that evening. It's almost time for the business dinner party and Darrin's happy that Serena did not come back. Larry and Louise show up with prospective Italian client, Ms. Clio Vanita (Nancy Kovack). The Italian wine heiress instantly makes advances on Darrin. Serena shows up and Sam asks her to please stay out of sight. Darrin tells Clio his idea for a campaign slogan and she is not impressed. Clio continues to makes advances on Darrin. Sam tells Serena that she does not feel threatened by Clio. Clio asks Darrin to come to Rome with her or she may take her account somewhere else. To defend her cousin, Serena changes Clio into a chimpanzee. Despite not being fond of Clio, Sam is not happy with what Serena did. Sam tells everyone that Clio had a headache and went to lie down in the den. Larry and Louise leave. When Darrin finds out who the chimp is, he banishes Serena from their house forever. Sam reminds Darrin that Serena is the only one who can change Clio back. Note: Filmed October 10, 1968.
156	16	"Cousin Serena Strikes Again (Part 2)"	Richard Michaels	Ed Jurist	January 16, 1969
It's the next morning and Darrin has to get Clio to an eleven o'clock meeting to sign a contract. Larry comes by and asks what happened to Clio after Darrin dropped her off last night. Serena finalley comes back and Darrin apologizes to her. They discover that the chimpanzee has escaped. Samantha and Darrin frantically search for Clio. They find a little boy who says his friend found the chimp and took it home. Darrin leaves for the office to get things ready. Sam talks to the Woman (Bobo Lewis) at the house and learns her son took the chimp to a pet Shop. When Sam gets to the pet shop, the Owner (Bryan O'Byrne) says he already sold it. The Owner says he sold it to a Joe Scibetta (Cliff Norton) and tells Sam where she can find him. It turns out that Joe is an organ grinder. The chimp gets away from Joe and he, a police officer (Richard X. Slattery) and Sam are chasing it down the street. Sam finally catches the chimp and takes it into the bathroom of an office building. She comes out of the bathroom with Clio and Serena. The policeman wants to know where the chimp went. Sam brings Clio to Darrin's office and Clio's a little confused. She also brought with Joe and a new monkey. Sam comes up with a slogan using the organ grinder and Clio loves it. Back at the house, Darrin is rude to Serena and she gives him a large nose. Note: Filmed October 15, 1968.
157	17	"One Touch of Midas"	Richard Michaels	Paul L. Friedman & Jerry Mayer	January 23, 1969
Samantha is making a dress for Tabitha by hand. Darrin comes home and gives Sam a gift for the sixth anniversary of their first date. It's just a small music box, but Sam loves it. Endora comes by to babysit Tabitha. She feels bad that Sam has to give up so many luxuries. The next day a man comes to Darrin's office wanting to see him. He shows secretary Betty a little doll that he would like Darrin to help him market. Betty instantly likes the doll, which the man calls "The Fuzz". The man calls himself Professor McAllister (Cliff Norton). Darrin sees the doll and it makes him feel good. Darrin will set things in motion with a client of his, Hanley's Department Store. Darrin brings the doll home and Sam and Tabitha are not that impressed. The dolls sell out quickly and the store wants 200,000 more for their stores all over the country. Because he partnered with McAllister, Darrin is now quite a bit wealthier. Darrin comes home with several expensive gifts. Sam is certain that Endora put a spell on the dolls. Endora denies having anything to do with it, but that does not mean someone else did not have a hand in it. Darrin is now spending money on many extravagant things. Sam tells Darrin the truth about the doll and he feels bad that he let it go to his head. Meg Wyllie as Miss Dobrin. Note: Filmed November 14, 1968.
158	18	"Samantha the Bard"	Richard Michaels	Richard Baer	January 30, 1969
Samantha comes down with something which causes her to speak in rhyme. When Sam cannot get a hold of Dr. Bombay, she summons Endora. Endora tells Sam that Bombay is on vacation, but she will try to track him down. Meanwhile, Larry tells Darrin that he has set up a business dinner for the next night with Oscar (Larry D. Mann) and Edna (Sara Seegar) Durfee of Durfee Dog Food. Larry insists that Sam be there because Edna wants to meet the wife of the man who's handling the account. Endora comes back with a potion that Bombay gave her for Sam. Larry calls Darrin and says the dinner date has been moved up to this evening. Sam drinks the potion but it does not work. Endora goes to find Bombay again. Endora is able to track Dr. Bombay down just before Larry is to pick up Sam and Darrin. Bombay learns that Endora misdiagnosed Sam. She actually has vocabularyitus and he is able to administer a cure. At the restaurant, Sam has a relapse during dinner. Sam tries to talk as little as possible, but she still winds up irritating the others. Sam pretends to check with the babysitter but actually zaps to the top of Mount Everest to find Dr. Bombay. Bombay increases the dosage and Sam zaps back to the dinner. Turns out Sam's annoying rhyming actually helps with Darrin selling his campaign. The next day Endora comes down with the disease. Dick Wilson as Drunk in Bar. Note: Filmed November 21, 1968.
159	19	"Samantha the Sculptress"	William Asher	Doug Tibbles	February 6, 1969
Tabitha is using witchcraft to transform her modeling clay into works too good for what she would be able to sculpt. Samantha tells Darrin she will learn how to sculpt herself. She can then show Tabitha how mortal children play with the clay. When Darrin starts eating daisy petals, Sam knows Endora had something to do with it. Endora does not like that Darrin keeps insisting that Tabitha do things the mortal way. At the office, Darrin and Larry meet potential client Walden R. Campbell (Cliff Norton). The first thing Campbell does is pour himself a drink. At lunch, Campbell continues to drink and makes Larry and Darrin drink with him. Larry suggests that Darrin host a dinner party with Campbell that evening. Darrin comes home a bit drunk. Sam sculpted an impressionistic clay bust of Darrin and shows it to him. Endora zaps Sam's bust into a perfect likeness of Darrin and it even talks. Larry comes by and is very impressed with the bust. Campbell then arrives and starts drinking. Endora then zaps up a bust of Larry. Larry and Campbell think they've had too much to drink when the busts move and talk. But thanks to the talking busts, Darrin gets the account. Notes: Filmed November 27, 1968.; The last complete episode filmed with Dick York.
160	20	"Mrs. Stephens, Where Are You?"	Richard Michaels	Peggy Chantler Dick & Douglas Dick	February 13, 1969 †
An obnoxious Salesman (Hal England) comes to Samantha's door. When he learns that Darrin is out of town, he makes a pass at Sam. She turns herself into an ugly woman and frightens the Salesman away. Sam has to run an errand and sees her elderly neighbor Miss Parsons (Ruth McDevitt) trying to get one of her cats out of a tree. Sam uses a little magic to help Miss Parsons. Serena comes by to babysit Tabitha. Darrin's mother Phyllis (Mabel Albertson) stops by and thinks Serena is Sam with her hair dyed. After learning who Serena is, Phyllis starts making comments about Endora and Uncle Arthur. Serena does not mind that so much. But when Phyllis calls Sam selfish with the way she treats Tabitha, Serena turns her into a cat. Phyllis the cat runs out of the house and Miss Parsons gets her out of a tree. Sam returns and finds out what Serena did. Sam goes looking for Phyllis and winds up at Miss Parsons' house. Meanwhile, Frank Stephens (Roy Roberts) comes by the house and meets Serena. Sam uses some magic to find out which of Miss Parsons many cats is Phyllis. Serena turns Phyllis back and she is quite confused. Notes: Filmed December 11, 1968.; Dick York does not appear in this episode.
161	21	"Marriage, Witches' Style"	William Asher	Michael Morris	February 20, 1969 †
Serena comes by and tells Samantha about her upcoming travels. Sam mentions that Darrin is away on business. Knowing how happy Sam is in her marriage, Serena thinks she should marry a mortal as well. Sam suggests going to a computer dating service to find a man. Mr. Beams (John Fiedler), at the service, has Serena fill out a form. Mr. Beams tells Serena that the computer matched her up with a Franklyn Blodgett (Lloyd Bochner). When Serena meets Franklyn at a restaurant, they are immediately taken with each other. The next day, Serena tells Sam how great the evening was. Serena wants to have Franklyn over for dinner at Sam's house. Serena wants to zap up a meal, but Sam says she will have to act like a mortal and cook it herself. What Serena does not know is that Franklyn is actually a warlock. Franklyn's father, Walter Blodgett, tells him he will have to act more like a mortal. Franklyn thinks Serena is a mortal and they have an awkward, but fun, evening. He tells Serena he would like to see her the next evening as he has something he wants to talk about. The next evening, the two reveal to each other their true selves and get a big laugh out of it. But then they start to point out each others faults. Serena and Sam go to another dating service and Mr. Lovelace (Peter Brocco) matches Serena up with another warlock. Note: Filmed January 20, 1969. Dick York does not appear.
162	22	"Going Ape"	Richard Michaels	Lila Garrett & Bernie Kahn	February 27, 1969 †
A chimpanzee follows Samantha and Tabitha home from the park. The Chimp witnessed Sam perform some magic. Because the chimp is well behaved and has clothes on, Sam believes he belongs to someone. Sam turns the chimp into a human so she can find out where he lives. The chimp (Lou Antonio) refuses to divulge who his owner is or where the little boy (Danny Bonaduce) lives. He wants to stay a human. Meanwhile, Evelyn Tucker (Gail Kobe) of Brawn Cologne, and her assistant, Bobby Flynn (Paul Smith) come to see Larry. Larry would've preferred they waited until Darrin came back from his business trip. Flynn has come up with a campaign that uses bodybuilders. Larry brings Evelyn and Bobby to Darrin's house to see if he is back yet. Endora is there. They see the man and believe that he will be the perfect spokes model. Endora says his name is "Harry Simmons". Harry is thrilled to stay human. Larry says that if Harry does not show up the next day, Darrin is fired. Darrin calls and says he will be gone another couple days. The next day, Harry is at the photo shoot. After a day of work, he wants to be a chimp again. Sam finds a way to save the account and get Harry fired. Sam is able to return the chimp to the little boy. Elmer Modlin as Charles Gilbert. Irvin Koszewski as Bodybuilder. Notes: Filmed January 27, 1969.; The scene where Lou Antonio is fired was filmed on the set of the apartment from The Monkees television series which was re-arranged for the movie Head.; This episode was the immediate answer to the I Dream of Jeannie episode "Fly Me To The Moon" (S3E1) that aired on September 12, 1967. Dick York does not appear.
163	23	"Tabitha's Weekend"	R. Robert Rosenbaum	Peggy Chantler Dick & Douglas Dick	March 6, 1969 †
Samantha has Darrin's mother Phyllis over. Endora suddenly pops in. Endora mentions how she took Tabitha to the zoo recently. Phyllis would like to have Tabitha over for a day. Later, Frank comes by and says that to make Phyllis feel better, they would like to have Tabitha spend the weekend with them. Sam is reluctant, but consents and goes along as well. Phyllis is not thrilled that Sam tagged along. Phyllis takes Tabitha out back where she shows her a talking Myna bird. Tabitha uses some magic to make the bird hold a conversation with her. Phyllis hears part of the conversation and tells Frank about it. By the time Phyllis brings Frank over to listen to the bird, Sam has Tabitha change it back. Endora pops into the in-laws' house. Endora and Phyllis begin bickering and Tabitha goes missing. Sam says she probably is playing hide and seek. Phyllis and Frank go looking for her. Sam thinks Endora had something to do with it, but Endora denies it. Sam figures out that Tabitha to turn herself into a raisin cookie. Sam gets Tabitha to change back and Frank and Phyllis think they saw it. Sam cancels the weekend visit and punishes Tabitha for misbehaving by not giving her desert. Notes: Filmed February 3, 1969.; Dick York does not appear in this episode.
164	24	"The Battle of Burning Oak"	R. Robert Rosenbaum	Leo Townsend & Pauline Townsend	March 13, 1969
Samantha tells Endora that her and Darrin will be entertaining J. Earl Rockeford (Edward Andrews) and his wife, Hortense (Glenda Farrell). Rockeford is a McMann & Tate client. Sam says that Rockeford's ancestors came over on the Mayflower. That evening, Rockeford mentions that he is the Chairman of the Board of the exclusive Burning Oak Country Club. He invites Darrin and Sam to join. Darrin hesitates to consider membership. Rockeford takes it as an insult and leaves without discussing business. Larry is furious. Darrin decides to apologize to Larry and Rockeford the next day. Larry tells Darrin that Rockeford wants the two of them to play golf with him at the club. Hortense calls Sam and invites her to lunch at the club. Hortense wants Sam to meet two other women of the screening committee, Cynthia Monteagle (June Vincent) and Jessica Morton (Harriet MacGibbon). Endora does not like the idea of Sam mingling with the snobs of the club. Endora puts a spell on Darrin turning him into a snob. At lunch, Sam finds the women to be quite snobbish. When Darrin comes home, Sam can tell Endora put a spell on him by the snobbish way he is acting. Sam has Aunt Hagatha do some digging into the members' family histories. At the club, Endora brings Sam the information that Aunt Hagatha found and she takes the spell off of Darrin. Sam exposes the not too favorable ancestors of some of the club members and her and Darrin leave. The next day Darrin tells Sam they got the Rockeford account and the club is changing their rules. Mauritz Hugo as Mr. Monteagle. Note: Filmed June 15, 1968.
165	25	"Samantha's Power Failure"	William Asher	Lila Garrett & Bernie Kahn	March 20, 1969 †
Samantha is woken up during the night by Endora. Endora says that the Witches' Council has finally had enough of her mortal marriage. The Council takes away Sam's powers when she refuses to disavow her marriage. The next day, Uncle Arthur and Serena come by. They tell Sam and Endora that they support Sam's decision. The Council takes their powers away as well. Arthur and Serena figure that if Sam can live like a mortal, so can they. They will get jobs and adjust. They take jobs at a malt shop and the manager, Buck (Ron Masak), immediately makes a pass at Serena. Things do not go well when they try to make chocolate dipped bananas. That night, Endora asks Sam to go to the Council and ask their forgiveness. Sam will not do that, but she will plead her case. Sam goes to the council to make her case, even comparing them to the judges in Salem. They do not give Sam an answer. Back at home, they all realize they have regained their powers. Notes: Filmed February 10, 1969.; The opening scene in the Stephenses' bedroom is recycled footage from the Season 3 episode "The Trial and Error of Aunt Clara". Dick York only appears in this reused footage.
166	26	"Samantha Twitches for UNICEF"	William Asher	Ed Jurist	March 27, 1969 †
Samantha tells Endora that Darrin is away on business. Mrs. Wehmeyer (Sara Seegar) comes by and ropes Sam into joining a women's committee that's raising money for UNICEF. Sam learns from the committee that wealthy builder E.J. Haskell (Herb Voland) has reneged on his $10,000 pledge. Mrs. Wehmeyer tells Sam the women have decided that she should go to convince Haskell to honor his pledge. Sam arrives at Haskell's house and he thinks she the decorator. When Haskell learns why Sam is there, he tells her to never show her face around him again. Sam comes up with a plan. She will haunt Haskell by having him see her face everywhere he goes. Haskell goes to see psychiatrist Dr. H. Chomsky (Bernie Kopell) about his hallucinations. Sam has Chomsky leave the room and then she impersonates the doctor. Endora pops in and Haskell goes running out of the room. Endora suggests Sam also talk to Haskell's fiancee, Lila Layton. Lila refuses to help Sam. After Sam leaves, a young man comes out from behind a wall and gives Lila a hug. Lila and Haskell are at a restaurant. Sam and Endora are also there and learn Lila is a bit of a gold-digger and talked Haskell out of making the donation. With a little magic, Sam gets Lila to say a few things Haskell does not like including that she has a boyfriend. Haskell gives Lila cab fare and has her leave. Sam comes to his table and Haskell believes Sam represents his conscience. He decides in order to get rid of her, he needs to make good on his pledge. Notes: Filmed February 19, 1969.; Dick York does not appear in this episode.
167	27	"Daddy Does His Thing"	William Asher	Michael Morris	April 3, 1969
It's Darrin's birthday and Maurice makes a surprise appearance. Maurice actually does not mind Darrin too much because he makes Samantha happy. Maurice gives Darrin a birthday gift. It is a lighter with a perpetual calendar. Maurice says that he enchanted the lighter and it will allow Darrin to have powers of witchcraft whenever he wants. Darrin says that while he appreciates the gift, he cannot accept it as he is against witchcraft. Maurice is insulted and he turns Darrin into a jackass. Maurice then leaves. Gladys Kravitz is looking out her window and see the jackass in Sam's house. The next morning, Gladys comes by and says that people are not allowed to keep mules in their home. Sam summons Endora and they will go hunt down Maurice. They find him in France with two beautiful women, Yvette and Angelique. They bring Maurice back home. Tabitha tells Sam that Gladys and some men took the jackass away to an animal shelter. Sam goes to the shelter and brings Darrin back. Maurice makes a couple attempts to reverse the spell with no luck. Gladys comes by and sees Maurice playing chess with the jackass. Something Sam says, gives Maurice an idea. He is able to change Darrin back. Karl Lukas as Keeper #1. Notes: Filming completed February 25, 1969.; Dick York appears briefly in this episode. He collapsed on the set during filming and was rushed to a hospital, where it was decided he would leave the show.; When Maurice first appears, he comments on how radiant and glowing Samantha is. The "special surprise" Samantha was going to reveal to Darrin at the beginning of the episode was not revealed, but presumably was the announcement that she was going to have another baby, which became the subject of the next episode.
168	28	"Samantha's Good News"	Richard Michaels	Richard Baer	April 10, 1969 †
Maurice pops in and again mentions how glowing Samantha appears. He introduces Sam to his young and attractive secretary, Abigail Beecham (Janine Gray). Sam summons Endora. Endora is immediately annoyed and jealous because of Abigail. Maurice claims he hired Abigail because of her skills, not her looks. Endora then turns Abigail into an old woman. Maurice changes her back. While Maurice and Endora are talking, Sam has a talk with Abigial. Abigail tells Sam she is not interested in marriage. Endora is still upset and threatens an ectoplasmic interlocutory (divorce). After she leaves, Maurice does not seem too concerned. Endora returns to talk to Sam. She decided against the divorce, but does not know what to do next. Sam suggests that Endora make Maurice jealous by courting John Van Millwood (Murray Matheson), another thespian warlock. Endora returns with John and Maurice is annoyed with his acting rival. Abigail is bored with John and Maurice's bickering and wants to leave. John believes Abigail could be a good actress and they leave together. Maurice and Endora guess that Sam is expecting another baby and Sam confirms it. Sam calls Darrin to give him the news. Sam tells Tabitha the news and she says she would rather have a pony. The question of boy or girl, witch, warlock, or mortal returns. Notes: Filmed March 4, 1969.; Dick York does not appear in this episode.
169	29	"Samantha's Shopping Spree"	Richard Michaels	Richard Baer	April 17, 1969 †
Samantha's jokester cousin Henry (Steve Franken) suddenly shows up. Sam tells him that she and Tabitha were just leaving to go to Hinkley's (Jack Collins) department store. Endora then shows up and her and Henry decide to go along. At the store they run into Joseph Hinkley, Jr. (Jonathan Daly). He is the owner's son and it's his first day working there as a salesman. Joseph just got out of college. Sam picks out a couple dresses for Tabitha and she goes with the store clerk (Herbert Anderson) to pay for them. Joseph tries to show Henry some jackets and Henry plays some practical jokes on him. Henry then turns Joseph into a mannequin. Henry disappears without changing Joseph back. Sam has Endora take Tabitha home. Hinkley Sr. is looking for his son. Endora gets Aunt Hagatha to babysit Tabitha and she tells Sam she cannot locate Henry. Further problems arise when the store displays are being changed, which includes removing all the store mannequins. Sam learns from the clerk where the mannequins probably were taken. Sam runs into Fred (Dave Madden) and Harry (Herb Ellis), the men who moved the mannequins. Sam zaps herself and Henry away. Back at home, Tabitha says she saw the kind of spell Henry used and Endora is now able to change Joseph back. At the store, Sam tells Hinkley Sr. what a great salesman Joseph is. L.A. Rams wide-receiver Jack Snow appears as himself. Robert Towers as Jack-in-the-Box. Notes: Filmed March 11, 1969.; Dick York does not appear in this episode.
170	30	"Samantha and Darrin in Mexico City"	R. Robert Rosenbaum	John L. Greene	April 24, 1969
Samantha tells Endora that there's a chance she and Darrin might be going to Mexico City. Darrin makes a successful presentation to marketing executive Carlos Aragon (Victor Millan) for the launch of his company's Mexican bottled drink, Bueno. Darrin thinks he will now be going to Mexico to present his ideas to company president, Raul Garcia (Thomas Gomez). However, Larry says that he will be going to meet with Garcia instead. Darrin is upset because he did all the work and Larry will get all the glory. Larry is meeting with Aragon and Garcia in Mexico City. Sam pops in to do some eavesdropping. Larry is taking all the credit until Sam uses some magic on him. Garcia gets upset and leaves. Aragon suggests that Darrin be brought in to straighten things out. Larry agrees to get Darrin right away and he lies and says Darrin speaks fluent Spanish. Endora comes by to babysit Tabitha and Sam and Darrin leave. Without them knowing, Endora attempts a spell to make Darrin's fears of speaking Spanish "vanish". But it causes him to disappear when he utters a word of it, and reappear when he speaks English. Sam and Darrin are on the plane and when he speaks Spanish, he disappears. Sam knows Endora had something to do with it and pops back home to talk to her. Because she will not reverse the spell just yet, Darrin has to avoid speaking Spanish. At a meeting with Garcia, things are awkward when Darrin will not say the name of the product. Sam uses magic to help a little. Sam goes to see Endora again. Endora's attempt to take off the spell simply reverses it, so speaking English causes him to vanish. Sam finds a way for Darrin to be able to make a speech in front of an important audience of Bueno backers. Notes: Filmed September 19, 1968.; The final episode featuring Dick York as Darrin Stephens.; The Spanish-dubbed version of this episode is called "Samantha y Darrin en Montreal".

=== Season 6 (1969–70) ===
No. overall	No. in season	Title	Directed by	Written by	Original release date
171	1	"Samantha and the Beanstalk"	Richard Michaels	Michael Morris	September 18, 1969
Samantha and Darrin are talking about a name for the new baby. Sam mentions that she is sure Darrin is hoping for a boy. Tabitha overhears this and she is afraid that her parents like boys more than girls. Tabitha makes Jack (Johnny Whitaker), from the fairy tale world of Jack and the Beanstalk, come to life. She says that he can stay with her parents and she will go to his fairy land. Darrin's mother Phyllis (Mabel Albertson) comes by. Sam finds Jack in Tabitha's room. After realizing what happened, Sam goes into the book to get Tabitha and to put Jack back into the story. Darrin is left to entertain Phyllis and Jack, who they claim is a friend of Tabitha's. Sam gets to the top of the beanstalk and meets the Giant's wife (Bobo Lewis). The wife complains about the amount of food the Giant (Ronald Long) eats. Tabitha meets the Giant. He realizes she is a witch and wants her to leave. Meanwhile, Phyllis gets confused when Jack tries to tell her who he really is. Sam gets to the castle and meets the Giant's guard (Deacon Jones). He says that Tabitha did something bad. The Giant's wife tells Sam that Tabitha turned the hen that lays the golden egg into one that lays real eggs. The Giant's magic harp now plays Rock music. Tabitha turned the Giant into a tiny little man. Sam gets Tabitha to change everything back. Jack is returned to the book. Sam tells Tabitha she will always be loved even with the new baby around. Notes: Filmed April 18, 1969.; The first episode broadcast featuring Dick Sargent as Darrin Stephens.; In 1996, TV Guide ranked this episode No. 60 in its "100 Most Memorable Moments in TV History".
172	2	"Samantha's Yoo-Hoo Maid"	William Asher	Ed Jurist	September 25, 1969
Endora comes by and tells Samantha and Darrin that she found a maid to help during Sam's pregnancy. The new maid is Esmeralda (Alice Ghostley), a shy and insecure witch who fades in and out when she is nervous. Knowing Sam could use the help, Darrin reluctantly agrees. Darrin was going to work from home, but Endora finds a way to have Larry insist Darrin come to the office. Endora did this so she could privately tell Sam about one problem that Esmeralda has. She conjures up accidental witchcraft every time she sneezes. At the office, Darrin is forced by Larry to bring one of the firm's out-of-town clients, Mr. Hampton (J. Edward McKinley), to the house to see Darrin's layouts. Meanwhile, Esmeralda is reading Tabitha a fairy tale in the backyard. She sneezes and a unicorn appears. Just then, Darrin, Larry and Hampton arrive at the house. Endora leaves. Esmeralda sneezes and the chair that Hampton is sitting in levitates. Before anyone else sees it, the chair comes down. Larry and Hampton then see the unicorn. Darrin tells Hampton that the unicorn is a symbol for Hampton's new economy car. Hamptom likes the idea. Larry sees Esmeralda fade in and out and believes he is had too much to drink. Sam later tells Darrin that she is arranged to have Esmeralda around only when she needs her. Darrin then learns what happens when Esmeralda sneezes. Notes: Filmed April 9, 1969.; Alice Ghostley makes her first appearance as klutzy Esmeralda. Her character was meant as a replacement for Aunt Clara (originally portrayed by Marion Lorne, who died in May 1968 during production). Ghostley previously appeared in the Season 2 episode "Maid To Order", as a mortal housekeeper named Naomi who fills in for the Tates' regular maid (who was named Esmeralda).
173	3	"Samantha's Caesar Salad"	William Asher	Ed Jurist	October 2, 1969
Darrin will be home for lunch soon and Samantha has nothing ready yet. She calls in Esmeralda for some help. Sam wants to change Tabitha's dress, so she asks Esmeralda to make a Caesar salad. Julius Caesar (Jay Robinson) makes an unexpected visit to the 20th century when Esmeralda accidentally conjures up the Emperor instead of the salad. Darrin arrives home and gets a call from Larry, who says he will be stopping by soon. Darrin then meets Caesar. Esmeralda wants to give Caesar a suit like Darrin's, but winds up switching Caesar's clothes with Darrin's. Larry stops in and wonders why Darrin is dressed that way. Esmeralda manages to switch the clothes back. Larry will be hosting a business dinner for a potential new client, Evelyn Charday, who is trying to market a new men's cologne. Larry wants Darrin to come up with a campaign by that evening. After being called a dictator in a history book, Caesar leaves the house to go to city hall. Something came up and Larry now wants Darrin to host the business dinner. Sam goes looking for Caesar. Caesar arrives at City Hall and pays the Taxi Driver (John Harmon) in gold coins. Sam finds Caesar and is able to take him home after talking to a Police Officer (Herb Ellis). Esmeralda has the correct spell to send him back, but it will not work because Caesar does not want to go back. Larry and Evelyn arrive. Sam conjures up Cleopatra in order to entice Caesar to want to go back. Before his return, Caesar and Cleopatra prove to be useful in Darrin and Larry's campaign idea problem. Note: Filmed August 22, 1969.
174	4	"Samantha's Curious Cravings"	Richard Michaels	Lawrence J. Cohen & Fred Freeman	October 9, 1969
Expectant mother Samantha is having food cravings. When a piece of chocolate cake that she was craving suddenly appears, she figures Endora may have sent it. Sam goes to see Dr. Anton (William Schallert), her obstetrician. When food she craves suddenly shows up while in the doctor's office, Sam knows something's wrong. Sam tells Darrin what happened and he says they need to do something about it as Larry is coming by. Endora pops in and then Larry shows up. Larry expects Darrin and Sam to show up later to a cocktail party for potential client, Mr. Paxton. Darrin tells him he is not sure Sam can make it. Sam is able to get a hold of Dr. Bombay. Dr. Bombay believes he is cured Sam, but he actually reversed it and now Sam goes to the food. Sam thinks the baby's coming and Darrin races her to the hospital. On the way they get stopped by a policeman. Sam gets a craving for a hot dog and vanishes. Darrin tries to tell the policeman about Sam, but she is not there and he gets a ticket. Sam calls Darrin at the hospital from the baseball park, where she is having a hot dog. Sam winds up at the hospital and Dr. Bombay comes back. Bombay cures Sam and then Dr. Anton says she is not having the baby yet. Note: Filmed April 25, 1969.; The phone used when Samantha is at Shea Stadium features the initials "BA + EM" inside a drawing of a heart, representing executive producer Bill Asher and Elizabeth Montgomery, who had just gotten married.
175	5	"...And Something Makes Four"	Richard Michaels	Richard Baer	October 16, 1969
It's time for Samantha to have the baby and Darrin is a nervous wreck. After they arrive at the hospital, Maurice suddenly pops in. Darrin and Maurice are in the waiting room. Nurse Horgan (Bobo Lewis) comes in and tells them that Sam had a boy. Nurse Horgan wheels out the baby for them to see and then Darrin goes to check in on Sam. Maurice does not like the idea that his grandson is not getting special treatment. Maurice casts a spell that makes all who gaze on him fall in love with the child. Mrs. Goodall (Pat Priest), the day supervisor, tells Sam and Darrin how much she loves their boy. She also says that Larry Tate is here. All the other new mothers and fathers are falling in love with the baby. Larry wants to use the baby in an advertising campaign. Sam and Darrin do not want their baby in commercials. Sam tells Darrin that the hospital wants to paint a mural of the baby as inspiration to other expectant parents. They figure Maurice has something to do with it. Maurice refuses to reverse the spell and leaves. Larry brings in a camera crew to film the baby. Sam comes up with a clever way to get Maurice to reverse the spell. Art Metrano as Ralph Davis. Marguerite Ray as Nurse Helen. Hilary Thompson as Mrs. Paikowski. Note: Filmed September 5, 1969.
176	6	"Naming Samantha's New Baby"	William Asher	Ed Jurist	October 23, 1969
Samantha and Darrin decided to name their new baby Frank Maurice Stephens after the two grandfathers. Darrin's parents will be coming by soon to see the new baby. Endora pops in to tell them that Maurice will be coming by because he is not happy that the child is not named after him first. Frank and Phyllis arrive and Phyllis is not happy about Endora being there. Maurice then shows up. When they call the baby Frank, Maurice gets upset. He would like to speak to Sam and Darrin alone. Maurice makes Phyllis not feel well and she and Frank leave. Maurice tells Endora to leave. He then takes the spell off of Phyllis and they head back to Sam's house. Maurice zaps Darrin into the mirror until the situation is corrected to his satisfaction. Frank and Phyllis see Darrin in the mirror and Sam says it is an invention of Maurice's. After talking with Maurice, Frank decides he does not want the child called "Little Frank". Sam comes up with a compromise name, Adam, who was Maurice's great-grandfather. Later, Frank comes back because he wants to invest in Maurice's invention. Sam comes up with a reason why Darrin's picture is not in the mirror anymore. Note: Filmed August 29, 1969.
177	7	"To Trick or Treat or Not to Trick or Treat"	William Asher	Shirley Gordon	October 30, 1969
In the show's fifth Halloween-themed episode, Samantha is making Tabitha's costume. Endora comes by and sees a lot of ugly witch masks. Sam says she is making costumes for the local kids who are participating in the trick-or-treat for UNICEF fundraising campaign. Endora thinks it's Darrin's fault that Sam and Tabitha are taking part in this holiday that insults witches. While at the office, Darrin slowly transforms into an ugly old witch. Their client Harold Bartenbach (Larry D. Mann) arrives. Darrin tries to hide what is happening to him and goes home. When he gets home, he apologizes to Endora and he says he now can appreciate how she feels when witches are depicted that way. She reverses the spell. But when Darrin says she should not meddle in his family's affairs, she turns him back into the witch. Sam promises to not go trick-or-treating with Tabitha if Endora takes off the spell. The next day at work, Larry tells Darrin that Bartenbach's wife is the chairwoman of the UNICEF campaign. Larry says that Sam quit the committee and Harold is not pleased. Darrin tells Sam that the UNICEF campaign is too important and that he, Sam and Tabitha will go trick-or-treating. Endora turns Darrin into a witch again. They go trick-or-treating with Darrin as a witch. They collect the most money for the campaign. After Bartenbach sees Darrin, he gets an idea that he would like to use one of those haggard looking witches in his upcoming advertising campaign. Sam comes up with a way that they can still use a witch and not be offensive. Endora changes Darrin back. Paul Sorensen as Motorcycle Cop. Note: Filmed September 11, 1969.
178	8	"A Bunny for Tabitha"	William Asher	Ed Jurist	November 6, 1969
Samantha and Darrin are decorating for Tabitha's birthday party. Uncle Arthur pops in. At the birthday party, Arthur is entertaining the children with magic tricks. Larry and new client A. J. Sylvester (Bernie Kopell) show up. Arthur then accidentally changes Tabitha's new bunny rabbit into a voluptuous Playboy bunny (Carol Wayne). Larry and Sylvester are very impressed. Sam suggests that Arthur make the Bunny disappear, but he has trouble reversing the spell. Sylvester is quite smitten with Bunny. After a little while, Sylvester and Bunny are gone. Sam and Arthur find them in a bar. Anita, an old girlfriend of Sylvester's, tells him he should call her some time. Arthur leaves and Sam goes to talk to the couple. Sam invites them to a vegetarian dinner. At dinner, Sylvester announces that he and Bunny are engaged. Darrin annoys Sylvester when he says Bunny is not right for him. Bunny gets very mad and slaps Sylvester in the face when he says he has hunted rabbits. Later, Darrin tells Sam that Sylvester liked his campaign ideas and that he got back together with Anita. When Arthur tries a different spell, he winds up with six Bunnys. Danny Bonaduce as Robert, one of the boys at Tabitha's party. Dick Wilson as Drunk. Notes: Filmed September 18, 1969.; Erin Murphy's twin sister Diane is among the children at the birthday party. She is credited as playing "Diane", but Samantha calls her "Annabelle".; This episode was parodied on The Rerun Show in 2002.
179	9	"Samantha's Secret Spell"	Richard Michaels	Ed Jurist	November 13, 1969
Endora pops in and wants Samantha to go with her to a costume ball. After an argument with her, Darrin bans Endora from his house. Endora tells Sam that Darrin has until midnight to withdraw his ultimatum or she will turn him into a mouse permanently. To avert the transformation, Sam consults the Apothecary (Bernie Kopell) to see if there is anything that can be done to counter such a spell. There is, but it requires Darrin to do three seemingly difficult if not impossible tasks, without him knowing and without the help of magic. Sam manages to get Darrin to do the first task. It takes a little maneuvering, but Darrin does the second task. Meanwhile at the office, Larry learns that some files he had locked up are missing. Only he and Darrin had a key to the cabinet. The third task involves an elaborate scheme with a helicopter over water, but Darrin does it. Larry brings a security guard to check Darrin's briefcase for the files. Thanks to a mix up, the files are found and Darrin is no longer a suspect. It's midnight and Darrin does not change into a mouse. Endora winds up changing the wrong person into a mouse. Sidney Clute as Ralph Jackman. Notes: Filmed September 30, 1969.; Partial remake of the Season 2 episode "We're In For a Bad Spell".
180	10	"Daddy Comes for a Visit (Part 1)"	Richard Michaels	Rick Mittleman	November 20, 1969
Maurice pops in and Samantha invites him to breakfast. He would like something special and Sam reminds him that Darrin does not want her to use magic unless it's an emergency. Maurice thinks that if Darrin had the powers of witchcraft, he would feel differently. Maurice gives Darrin a watch. When Darrin learns that the watch will enable him to perform minimal witchcraft, he refuses to take it. Maurice turns him into a dog. After Darrin is turned back, he agrees to take to watch for one day. At the office, Darrin shows Larry and Bliss, Jr. (John Fiedler) a modern campaign for Bliss cough syrup. Bliss Pharmaceuticals usually prefers a more traditional approach. Bliss, Jr. tells them that there is another agency vying for their account. Maurice tells Darrin that with magic he could attend the Bliss board meeting. Maurice finds a way to get Darrin to go. At the meeting, Bliss, Sr. (J. Edward McKinley) decides to go with the other agency because of their traditional campaign. Darrin tells Larry he has inside information that they need to change their campaign to something more traditional. Darrin now likes the idea of witchcraft. Sam tells Maurice that Darrin will come to his senses soon. Notes: This episode and the next completed filming on October 10, 1969.; Rewrite of the Season 5 episode "Daddy Does His Thing", which was ultimately modified to exclude an ill Dick York, who collapsed on set during filming, culminating in his leaving the show.
181	11	"Darrin the Warlock (Part 2)"	Richard Michaels	Story by : Rick Mittleman; Teleplay by : Ed Jurist & Rick Mittleman	November 27, 1969
Darrin agreed to use Maurice's magic watch for one day. It's the next day and Samantha is sure Darrin will go back to his mortal ways. Darrin, however, is still using his powers. At the office, Larry tells Darrin there's a $5000 bonus if he lands the Bliss Pharmaceuticals account. Larry wants Darrin to have Mr. Bliss Sr. over for dinner and present the new campaign to him there. Darrin pops back to the house to tell Sam. Darrin tells her that he is converted and likes using witchcraft. Sam wants things the way they were before. Something Larry says makes Darrin rethink using magic anymore. Back at home, Darrin gives Maurice the watch. Maurice leaves the watch on the TV. That night Bliss Sr. and Bliss Jr. are at the house. Maurice comes by and makes sure Darrin sees the watch. Darrin does not use the watch. He tells Bliss Sr. that he believes they should go with his original modern campaign. While Bliss Sr. appreciates Darrin opinion, a modern approach is not for him. Larry fires Darrin. After they have left, Darrin hands Maurice the watch. An angry Maurice then leaves. The next day, Larry comes by to say that Bliss Sr. changed his mind and will use Darrin's campaign.
182	12	"Samantha's Double Mother Trouble"	David White	Peggy Chantler Dick & Douglas Dick	December 4, 1969
Samantha gets a call from Darrin's mother Phyllis, who says she will be stopping by shortly. Meanwhile, Esmeralda accidentally sneezes Mother Goose (Jane Connell) out of Tabitha's storybook. Sam sees Mother Goose. Esmeralda thinks Sam is mad and she fades away. Phyllis arrives with a new wig and Mod clothes. She tells Sam she left Frank (Roy Roberts). Phyllis is angry with Frank because she has become a new modern woman with a new modern wardrobe to match and she believes Frank mocked her. She would like to stay here for a while. Esmeralda tells Sam that Mother Goose will eventually fade away. Phyllis sees Mother Goose and Sam tries to pass her off as an Aunt. Frank arrives looking for his wife and instead strikes up a conversation with the more traditional Mother Goose. Darrin comes home and Sam tries to tell him what's going on. Sam hopes to make Phyllis jealous of Mother Goose as a way to get her and Frank back together. Sam throws in a bit of witchcraft to help things along. Esmeralda sneezes and Mother Goose turns into a real goose. Both Phyllis and Frank think they are seeing things. Then the goose disappears. Phyllis and Frank wind up getting back together. Note: Filmed October 16, 1969.
183	13	"You're So Agreeable"	Luther James	Ed Jurist	December 11, 1969
Samantha asks Darrin to just be a little agreeable the next time Endora pops in. Endora does come by and Darrin is sarcastically polite. Without Sam or Darrin knowing, Endora puts a spell on Darrin to make him agree with anything anyone says. At the office, Larry tells Darrin that Mr. Shotwell (Charles Lane) will be coming by. Larry says that Shotwell claims to not like "yes" men, but in reality he hates people who disagree with him even more. Shotwell gets annoyed with Darrin continually agreeing with him and decides to take his account elsewhere. Larry indirectly fires Darrin. Darrin tells Sam what happened and he thinks it might be time for another job. Sam uses a little magic to help Darrin get a job with Mr. Washburn's (J. Edward McKinley) ad agency. Darrin tells Sam that Gladys asked him to be chairman of the Save The Starlings committee and he agreed. Sam figures out that Endora put a spell on Darrin. Sam tells Endora to take the spell off. But Endora reverses the spell to make him disagree with everyone. Larry comes by to apologize because Shotwell changed his mind about the campaign. Darrin is about to tell Larry off, when Sam gets Endora to remove the spell. Darrin and Larry make up. Morgan Jones as Johnson. Note: Filmed October 23, 1969.
184	14	"Santa Comes to Visit and Stays and Stays"	Richard Michaels	Ed Jurist	December 18, 1969
It's days before Christmas and Tabitha is upset because a friend of hers says there is no Santa Claus. Samantha is behind with her shopping so she asks Esmeralda to stay with Tabitha. Esmeralda sneezes and mistakenly zaps Santa Claus (Ronald Long) to the house. Sam tells him that Esmeralda's mistakes usually fade away quickly, but sometimes it could take days. Gladys comes by to remind Sam about a neighborhood decorating contest. She sees Santa and thinks it's Darrin dressed up. Santa reminds Sam that he still has a lot of work to do before Christmas Eve. Larry comes by and complains to Darrin that Louise wants a mink stole. After something Santa says, Sam brings all his helpers to the house. They get to work making presents. Gladys is snooping around and sees Santa and the elves through Sam's window. The next morning, Sam zaps Santa's sleigh and reindeer into her front yard. Abner sees it and thinks it's decorations. The elves then load up the sleigh. Santa is about to leave when Larry shows up. Larry goes inside for a drink and Santa flies off. Larry sees the sleigh in the sky and Sam and Darrin come up with an explanation. Frank Delfino as Elf. Note: Filmed October 30, 1969.
185	15	"Samantha's Better Halves"	William Asher	Lila Garrett & Bernie Kahn	January 1, 1970
Samantha and Darrin are soon off to the Caribbean on what will be their first real vacation in five years. Darrin mentions that Larry always managed to find a reason for Darrin to work instead. Larry stops by. Larry hints that he would like Darrin to go to Chicago on a business trip in his place, but Darrin is not falling for it this time. Darrin jokingly says to Sam that he would go to Chicago if he could be in two places at the same time. Sam reminds Darrin what happened last time he said that. Sam flashes back to when she was close to giving birth to Adam. Darrin wants to be with Sam, but Larry is sending him on a business trip to Tokyo. Endora, without his knowledge, splits him in two. Later, when Darrin is still home, Sam figures out what Endora did. The other Darrin is on the plane with client Mr. Tanaka (Richard Loo). At home, doting Darrin is starting to annoy Sam. In Tokyo, all work Darrin is annoying Mr. Tanaka. Endora is trying to put the two Darrin's back together, but winds up having them switch places. Endora's next attempt works and Darrin is back to normal and home. Mr. Tanaka wonders where Darrin went. Sam tries to explain to Darrin what happened. Back to the present, Larry tries again to get Darrin to go to Chicago, but it does not work. Frances Fong as Mrs. Tanaka. Notes: Filmed March 31, 1969.; The first episode filmed with Dick Sargent, the story is framed as a flashback to when Samantha was expecting Adam. This is a remake of Season 2's "Divided He Falls".; This episode has the longest opening scene of the series, lasting approximately seven minutes.
186	16	"Samantha's Lost Weekend"	Richard Michaels	Richard Baer	January 8, 1970
Tabitha is at a stage where she does not always feel like eating. Esmeralda thinks it might be a psychological reaction to baby Adam. Esmeralda wants to help. Without telling anyone, she places a spell on a glass of milk to help Tabitha's appetite. Samantha drinks it instead and starts eating. Esmeralda goes to see the Apothecary (Bernie Kopell) to get something to cure a hunger spell. Meanwhile, Abner comes by with a petition and sees Sam eating non stop. Sam tells Darrin that she believes she has contracted Voracious Ravenicitis. Esmeralda has to go babysit before the Apothecary can finish his potion. Sam and Darrin go to the market to stock up on food. She even takes food out of other people's carts. At home, Sam calls for Dr. Bombay. His Nurse (Pat Priest) comes by saying that Bombay is not available right now. Dr. Bombay finally arrives, but due to Sam's erroneous diagnosis, the treatment causes her to fall asleep in mid-sentence. Abner comes by again and Sam keeps falling asleep on him. Esmeralda gets the Apothecary's potion. Dr. Bombay and Esmeralda finally figure out how to cure Sam. Merie Earle as Old Lady in grocery store. Jonathan Hole as Manager. Notes: Filmed November 30, 1969.; The episode title is a takeoff on the 1945 film The Lost Weekend, starring Ray Milland.
187	17	"The Phrase Is Familiar"	Richard Michaels	Jerry Mayer	January 15, 1970
Samantha tells Darrin that she thinks Tabitha is ready for kindergarten. Endora comes by with Warlock tutor Professor Poindexter Phipps (Jay Robinson). Darrin agrees that Phipps can work with Tabitha if he does so in a mortal way. Phipps looks at one of Darrin's campaign drawings that uses a cliché. To mock Darrin's profession, Endora casts a spell that causes him to constantly speak in clichés. Meanwhile, Phipps conjures up the Artful Dodger from the Dicken's book. When Sam questions what Phipps did, he says he promised to not teach witchcraft, but he will still use it. At the office, Darrin notices that he is speaking in clichés to Larry and decides to go home. Back at home, Endora promises to cancel the spell, but she alters it to make the clichés come true. Darrin meets up with Larry and H.B. Summers (Cliff Norton) at a restaurant. Summers likes using clichés as slogans for his campaigns, but Darrin does not want to say any as he knows what will happen. Darrin goes home and Larry and Summers show up. Something Darrin says causes him and Summers to have baseball uniforms on. Sam gets Endora to take the spell off Darrin. Sam finds a way to have Larry and Summers think they imagined the uniforms and they go for Darrin's campaign. A problem of a different kind emerges when the Artful Dodger comes into contact with Summers. Elmer Modlin as Head Waiter. George Holmes as Elevator Passenger. Note: Filmed November 6, 1969.
188	18	"Samantha's Secret Is Discovered"	William Asher	Lila Garrett & Bernie Kahn	January 22, 1970
Endora is babysitting while Samantha went shopping. When Sam gets home, all the furniture has been replaced by Endora. Sam and Endora keep using witchcraft to change the furniture back and forth. Phyllis comes in, sees the magic being done and faints. When Phyllis comes to, she thinks she is losing her mind. Darrin comes home and Sam tells him what happened. So Phyllis does not think she is crazy, Darrin and Sam decide to tell her the truth. They also tell Phyllis to not mention it to Frank just yet. Frank comes by and the first thing Phyllis says to him is that Sam is a witch. Darrin reluctantly wants Sam to show Frank, but suddenly her powers are gone. Frank thinks Phyllis is confused. Later, Endora tells Sam that the Witches Council removed her powers at that moment. Phyllis tells Dr. Rhinehouse (Bernie Kopell) that she thinks she is insane. When Sam, Darrin and Frank read a note Phyllis left them, they believe she checked herself into a rest home. Sam finds the rest home Phyllis is at. Sam finds a way to convince Phyllis that she hallucinated everything because of the tranquilizers she had been taking. C. Lindsay Workman as Doctor at the Rest Home. Nydia Westman as Mrs. Quigley, another patient at the Rest Home. Note: Filmed November 20, 1969.
189	19	"Tabitha's Very Own Samantha"	William Asher	Shirley Gordon	January 29, 1970
Tabitha really wants to go to the play park, but Samantha is just to busy with Adam. Tabitha's jealous enough to misbehave. Darrin punishes her by sending her to her own room. Tabitha then wishes for herself her very own special mommy she does not have to share with anyone. Tabitha tells fake Sam to make sure the real Sam does not see her. They go to the play park. Gladys and her nephew Seymour are there as well. Fake Sam does not know who anyone else is, so she does not interact with Gladys. At the office, Larry tells Darrin that client Mr. Nickerson (Parley Baer) and his wife (Sara Seegar) would like to come over to Darrin's house for dinner again. Darrin calls Sam and tells her that Gladys called him and mentioned the park. Darrin and Samantha believe the double is Serena playing games with their daughter again. Sam gets Aunt Hagatha to watch Adam and she goes to the park. Tabitha sees Sam, so her and fake Sam zap back home. Gladys has another run in with fake Sam. Darrin comes home and thinks fake Sam is the real one. There is a little more confusion, but Sam and Darrin think Serena has left. That night, Larry and the Nickersons arrive. And fake Sam comes back as well. After Tabitha tells her mother she is not Serena and Sam sees it for herself, Tabitha explains why she did what she did. Sam convinces her daughter that she loves her, but sometimes has to be firm when necessary. She convinces Tabitha to wish her very own special mommy who spoils her rotten to go away and she does. Tabitha realizes that her mother really does love her. Notes: Filmed November 26, 1969.; Aunt Hagatha is listed as "Aunt Agatha" in the credits.
190	20	"Super Arthur"	Richard Michaels	Ed Jurist	February 5, 1970
Uncle Arthur drops by for an unexpected visit and he suddenly loses his power of witchcraft. Samantha summons Dr. Bombay and just then Larry comes by. Bombay gives Arthur a pill and leaves. Darrin tells Larry he is not finished with the Top Pop campaign. Arthur believes he is cured. But then side effects start happening which causes him to literally become everything he says. Arthur turns himself into a colt and then a Native American. Darrin leaves to play golf and Sam tries to get a hold of Dr. Bombay, with no luck. Sam tries to get Arthur's mind off of anything unusual. She decides to teach Arthur how to drive. Sam has to use magic to stop Arthur from getting into an accident. Arthur then turns into Superman and flies away. Several neighbors see Arthur. Meanwhile, Larry finds Darrin at the golf course and wants him to get back home to work on the campaign. Arthur winds up on Sam's roof and a Policeman (Paul Smith) comes by. Arthur starts flying around again. Larry and Darrin arrive. Arthur's flying helps Darrin with the Top Pop campaign. Sam comes up with an explanation for Arthur's ability to fly. Dr. Bombay finds a cure for the side effects. Note: Filmed December 4, 1969.
191	21	"What Makes Darrin Run?"	William Asher	Lila Garrett & Bernie Kahn	February 12, 1970
Endora still believes that Darrin has no ambition, which in turn deprives Samantha of the finer things in life. When Darrin says he is going to play golf instead of going to work, Endora thinks that proves her point. At the office, Larry would like Darrin to take over the Bob Braddock (Arch Johnson) account. Darrin says he is just too busy. Just then, Endora casts a spell on Darrin to give him a drive for ambition and power. Darrin tells Larry he will take the account, but he wants a raise. Darrin and Larry meet Braddock for lunch. Darrin makes a very good impression on Braddock. Back at home, Darrin's non-stop talk about getting further in business convinces Sam that Endora put a spell on him. Endora will not take to spell off Darrin. Darrin invites Howard McMann (Leon Ames), the president of McMann & Tate, and his wife Margaret for dinner in an effort to work his way up the corporate ladder. Darrin in a subtle way gets McMann to consider having Darrin take Larry place. Sam uses magic to have Larry and Louise come over. Sam finally gets Endora to remove the spell before it ruins Darrin and Larry's long friendship. Darrin finds a way to convince McMann that Larry is important to the agency. Notes: Filmed December 11, 1969.; One of only two episodes featuring Mr. McMann.; The first episode to feature Kasey Rogers' natural red hair (her black hair was a wig)
192	22	"Serena Stops the Show"	Richard Michaels	Richard Baer	February 19, 1970
Serena pops in and tells Samantha that she has been made the entertainment chairman for this year's Cosmos Cotillion. Larry and Darrin arrive. Darrin says that he arranged for pop duo Boyce & Hart to appear on a TV special sponsored by his client Breeze Shampoo. Wanting them to perform at her Cotillion, Serena goes to talk to Tommy Boyce, Bobby Hart and their manager, Chick Cashman (Art Metrano). She mentions that she would like them to sing a song she wrote, "I'll Blow You a Kiss in the Wind". Cashman kicks her out. Serena goes to see Sam and Darrin and asks Darrin's help. She performs her song and Darrin says it stinks. Something Sam says gives Serena the idea to cast a spell of unpopularity on the singers to alter their decision. Larry comes by the house and shows Darrin a newspaper article about Boyce & Hart's decline. Breeze Shampoo cancels the special and their account. Meanwhile, desperate for a job, Boyce & Hart agree to sing at Serena's Cotillion. Sam goes to the Cotillion and watches Boyce & Hart perform. She then convinces Serena to reverse her spell to save Darrin's job and the deal with Breeze. Judy Strangis as Sandra. Notes: First episode crediting "Pandora Spocks" as Serena. Filmed December 18, 1969. The liner notes on Boyce & Hart's Greatest Hits state that their song "I'll Blow You a Kiss in the Wind" is best known for its appearance in this episode of Bewitched.
193	23	"Just a Kid Again"	Richard Michaels	Jerry Mayer	February 26, 1970
Samantha and Tabitha are in a toy store buying a birthday present for a child friend. A salesman named Irving Bates (Ron Masak) tells Tabitha he wishes he were a kid again, and she grants him the wish. Nine year old Irving (Ricky Powell) tries to explain to his boss, Mr. Waterman (Jonathan Hole), who he is. Irving wants to point out Tabitha, but her and Sam have already left. Irving finds Sam's address and manages to get to the house. He explains who he is and tells Sam he thinks this is all a dream. Tabitha tries to change Irving back, but it does not work. Sam tries to tell Irving the truth about her and Tabitha being witches. Irving wants Sam to call his girlfriend Ruthie Campbell (Pat Priest) and make up a reason why he did not meet her for lunch. Ruthie is upset that Irving stood her up again. Irving tells Tabitha that he wants to stay a kid. Darrin finds out about Irving. Sam calls for Dr. Bombay. Bombay figures out that both Irving and Tabitha want him to remain a child. Sam takes Irving to see Ruthie. Sam uses some magic to have Ruthie's boss, Herman Drucker (C. Lindsay Workman), make some advances toward her. After Irving rescues Ruthie, he decides he wants to be a man again. Paul Smith as Policeman. Gordon Connell as Cab Driver. Note: Filmed January 8, 1970.
194	24	"The Generation Zap"	William Asher	Ed Jurist	March 5, 1970
Darrin tells Samantha that Larry has arranged for him to mentor a college student who is interested in advertising. The student is Dusty Harrison (Melodie Johnson), daughter of important client John Harrison (Arch Johnson). At the office, Darrin meets Dusty, who clearly only wants to learn the business. Because she promised to not interfere, Endora enlists Serena's help in casting a spell that makes Dusty fall madly in love with Darrin. Darrin senses the change in Dusty and sends her on an errand. That night, Dusty comes by the house. Sam can tell that Dusty has a crush on Darrin. Darrin tells Sam that he will see if Larry can assign Dusty to someone else. The next day, Dusty starts crying when Darrin suggests she work with another person. At home, Darrin tells Sam that Larry and Harrison are now mad at him. Sam figures out that some witchcraft is behind Dusty's behavior and that it was probably Serena. Sam goes to look for Serena. Serena changes herself into Sam and tells Darrin he should invite Harrison over. Harrison can see how happily married they are. Harrison comes by and Serena starts flirting with him. Dusty comes by and then Sam returns. Sam gets Serena to undo the spell, but not before things get out of control. Harrison pulls his account. Darrin and Sam later learn that Harrison was arrested for embezzlement and fraud. Note: Filmed January 15, 1970.
195	25	"Okay, Who's the Wise Witch?"	Richard Michaels	Richard Baer	March 12, 1970
Samantha and Darrin discover they cannot leave the house. Darrin has a meeting to be at soon. Sam calls Endora and asks her to remove the spell. Endora says she did not do it. They all figure Uncle Arthur did it. Endora cannot leave to look for him. Larry calls and wonders where Darrin is. Sam says Darrin is not feeling well. They then call for Esmeralda, who also claims to not have done the spell. Because she is now stuck in the house, Esmeralda will miss a date she was looking forward to. Endora conjures up some playground equipment for Tabitha. Larry comes by the house. Sam tells him through the door that the house is under quarantine. Dr. Bombay is summoned to correct the problem. It is discovered that a vapor lock has occurred due to Sam not using her powers on a regular basis. He can cure it, but he has to do it from the outside. Sam turns Bombay into a picture and slips him under the door. He is turned back into himself and cures the vapor lock. Sam finds a way to have the playground equipment help Darrin's latest ad campaign. Note: Filmed January 22, 1970.
196	26	"A Chance on Love"	Richard Michaels	John L. Greene	March 19, 1970
Samantha is having a busy day and Serena pops in. Sam gets a call from Mrs. Corby (Molly Dodd), the woman in charge of the raffle ticket sale. Sam was supposed to be there a little while ago. Sam thought it was for the next day. Sam gets Serena to fill in for her. Meanwhile, Larry is with client George Dinsdale (Jack Cassidy), of Dinsdale Soups. Larry tells Dinsdale that he will meet Darrin that evening. The raffle is at the same hotel that Dinsdale is at. Serena puts on the charm to try to get Dinsdale to buy a ticket. Dinsdale falls for Serena and they have drinks together. That night at Larry's dinner party, Sam and Darrin show up. Dinsdale thinks Sam is the woman he met earlier. Sam is surprised when he starts flirting with her. Sam realizes what happened and she tries to explain about Serena. The next day, Serena meets Dinsdale for lunch, looking like herself. Neither Sam nor Serena can convince him that they are not the same person, and he fires Darrin from the account. When Dinsdale refuses to stop making advances, Sam turns him into a parrot. He eventually comes to realize that Sam and Serena are two different people when he sees them together. Notes: Filmed January 30, 1970.; Partial remake of the 24th episode of season 1, "Which Witch Is Which?". Partially remade in Season 8 as "Serena's Richcraft".
197	27	"If the Shoe Pinches"	William Asher	Ed Jurist	March 26, 1970
Tabitha has been entertaining imaginary playmates in her new playhouse all afternoon. Suddenly a leprechaun named Tim O'Shanter (Henry Gibson) shows up and asks for some food. Tabitha goes to get the food. Endora shows up and tells Tim to get to work. Meanwhile, Larry comes by to see how Darrin is doing with the slogan for Barber canned peaches. Darrin says he is working on it and Larry leaves. Tim gives Darrin a pointy nose and he and Samantha think Tabitha did it. Tim then gives Darrin large pointy ears. Sam finds Tim and gets him to change Darrin back. Sam gets Tim to leave. Endora comes up with a plan and gets Tim to follow through. Tim leaves pair of enchanted boots for Darrin. Darrin puts them on and instantly becomes lazy. Sam figures out the shoes are hexed. Larry comes back and Darrin says he will not work on the slogan. Sam's witchcraft cannot get the boots off and Darrin cannot get them off himself. Sam finally gets Tim to remove the boots and she learns Endora was behind everything. To make up for what she did, Sam gets Endora to help Darrin with the slogan. Note: Filmed February 10, 1970.
198	28	"Mona Sammy"	Luther James	Michael Morris	April 2, 1970
Samantha and Darrin are recalling their first date. Because Sam got an anniversary cake from the bakery for free, they decided to have the Tate's over for a celebration. Endora pops in and decides to stay for dinner. Endora gives Sam an original Leonardo da Vinci painting of Sam's look-alike Great Aunt Cornelia, in the style of the Mona Lisa. Darrin hides the painting. Just as Larry and Louise arrive, Endora zaps the painting over the fire place. Larry and Louise notice it and Endora says Darrin painted it. Endora puts Darrin's signature on it. During dinner, Louise asks Darrin to paint her portrait and Larry insists he do it. After the Tate's leave, Darrin and Sam tell Endora off. To get out of this mess, Darrin allows Sam to use her witchcraft for this one time only to allow him to paint a nice portrait of Louise. Darrin is almost done with a beautiful portrait, when his hand starts shaking. Louise's face now looks clownish. Larry does not let Louise see the painting and has Sam and Darrin leave with it. At home, Sam and Darrin know that Endora had something to do with it. Larry and Louise show up and Larry tells Darrin he is fired. Sam is able to fix the painting and shows it to Louise. Sam and Darrin come up with a reason why Larry thought he saw an ugly painting. Sam also comes up with a reason why Darrin cannot paint anymore. Note: Filmed February 16, 1970.
199	29	"Turn on the Old Charm"	Richard Michaels	Richard Baer	April 9, 1970
Darrin shows Samantha a card from client Augustus Sunshine (John Fiedler) of Sunshine Greeting Cards. Sam does not think the poem is very good. Darrin tells her that Augustus writes them all himself and their sales have been slipping. Sam and Darrin want to go out and ask Esmeralda to babysit, but she is busy. As a last resort, Sam call Endora. But because of something Darrin says, Endora refuses. Sam gives her father's magic amulet to Darrin to induce Endora into being nice to him. He has to keep it on him at all times and not abuse it. Sam has Endora come by and she is nothing but sweet to Darrin. At the office, Augustus comes by. Darrin suggests that Augustus add more humor to his cards. Augustus does not agree and he suggests a new agency. At home, Darrin does not have the amulet on him and Endora turns him into a dog. Larry calls Darrin and tells him he is bringing Augustus over in an hour to try and keep the account. Esmeralda thinks the amulet is a love charm and swipes it. Endora soon discovers she has been under the amulet's spell. She punishes Sam and Darrin by causing them to bicker in front of Larry and Augustus and they leave. Endora removes the spell. Sam uses magic to make Augustus and Larry return. Sam and Darrin tell them that they bickered as a way to show Augustus that he should start making funny insult cards. Note: Filmed February 20, 1970.
200	30	"Make Love, Not Hate"	William Asher	Ed Jurist	April 16, 1970
Darrin and Samantha are going to a business dinner at Larry's house. Darrin reminds Sam that client George Meiklejohn (Charles Lane) and his wife (Sara Seegar) are very conservative. Esmeralda was supposed to babysit, but she is very depressed. It seems her love interest, Ramon Varona, the salad chef at the Warlock Club, has been secretly dating the club's hat check girl. Sam calls Dr. Bombay to see if he knows anyone Esmeralda could meet to take her mind off of Ramon. Dr. Bombay's acquaintance Norton (Cliff Norton) initially thinks Sam is the woman he is to meet. When Norton actually meets Esmeralda, he is not impressed. Bombay concocts a love potion to help. Whomever drinks it will fall madly in love with the first person of the opposite sex they see. Most of the potion accidentally ends up in a bowl of clam dip. Norton drinks the potion, but Sam is the first person he sees and he chases her around the house. Darrin tells Sam that Larry moved the dinner to their house. Larry and the Meiklejohn's arrive. Esmeralda has some of the dip and falls in love with Darrin. George has some dip and falls for his wife, but she falls for Larry. Sam figures out what happened and calls for Bombay, who comes up with a antidote. Note: Filmed February 27. 1970.

=== Season 7 (1970–71) ===
No. overall	No. in season	Title	Directed by	Written by	Original release date
201	1	"To Go or Not to Go, That Is the Question: Part 1"	William Asher	Michael Morris	September 24, 1970
Darrin asks Samantha whether he should wait for Larry to give him the prestigious Gotham Industries account or should he demand it. After Darrin leaves, Endora comes by and she is unusually nice. Endora delivers a message from Queen Hepzibah (Jane Connell) that summons Sam to a witch's meeting in Salem, Massachusetts. Sam initially refuses. When Darrin tells Larry that he will not demand a raise or a bonus, Larry gives him the Gotham account. Later, Sam tells Darrin about the witches meeting. Endora turns Darrin into a toad until Sam agrees to go. After he is turned back, Darrin says Sam can go if he can go along. Larry is surprised when Darrin asks for a couple weeks vacation. When she hears Sam will bring Darrin along, Hepzibah visits the Stephenses to observe their marriage. Hepzibah has long disapproved of it, so she has come to see whether she will dissolve the marriage. She tells Sam and Darrin that she will stay for a week. Hepzibah redecorates the home more to her royal style. Note: Filmed July 23, 1970.
202	2	"Salem, Here We Come: Part 2"	William Asher	Michael Morris	October 1, 1970
Darrin is not happy about Queen Hepzibah staying at the house and changing things around. He suggests that Samantha just go to the Witch's Council in Salem alone. Darrin makes a comment that Hepzibah does not like and she gives him one demerit. When he gets to 10 demerits, he will be dissolved. During dinner, Darrin gets two more demerits. Larry comes by and sees the formal furniture and Darrin and Sam come up with a reason. They introduce Larry to Hepzibah and she asks him to join them for dinner. When Larry finds out about the exotic foods, he leaves. Hepzibah insists on observing Darrin at work so she and Sam go to Darrin's office. There she encounters a client of Darrin's named Ernest Hitchcock (Cesar Romero). Hitchcock does not appreciate Hepzibah's meddling in Darrin's business dealings. To protect Hitchcock, Sam places a spell on him before he is able to insult Hepzibah and he is now in love with her. Instead of going on a business lunch with Darrin, Hitchcock takes Hepzibah. Hepzibah comes home and says how charming Hitchcock was. Darrin tells her off. Hepzibah says Darrin has used all of his demerits and the marriage will be dissolved at midnight. Hitchcock comes by and tells Hepzibah he will meet her in Salem. Now that she sees mortals can be charming, Hepzibah will allow Darrin to come to Salem with Sam. Note: Filmed July 30, 1970.
203	3	"The Salem Saga: Part 1"	William Asher	Ed Jurist	October 8, 1970
Samantha and Darrin are heading to the airport and are saying goodbye to Tabitha and Adam. While on the airplane, Sam sees Endora sitting out on the wing. Endora then pops into the airplane cabin. After they arrive in Salem, they rent a car to do some sightseeing. Endora leaves Sam and Darrin. During a tour of the House of Seven Gables an antique bedwarmer begins harassing Sam. Miss Ferndale (Joan Hotchkis), the museum guide, notices Sam holding the bedwarmer. Miss Ferndale reminds everyone that they are not to touch anything. Sam believes that it is a witch or more likely a warlock is trapped in the bedwarmer. The bedwarmer makes its way to the Stephenses car and back to their hotel. Miss Ferndale memorized their car's license plate number. Sam thinks that whoever is trapped in the bedwarmer has been there since the Salem Witch Trials. Sam calls for Endora. Endora says that someone at the Council Meeting might know who it is. Miss Ferndale and two Police Officers (Richard X. Slattery and Ron Masak) arrive at the hotel. Darrin does not want to get into trouble and asks Sam to zap the bedwarmer back to the museum. She wants to help whoever is trapped in it. The Police knock on their door and Sam tries to zap it away, but it will not go. Nancy Priddy as Stewardess #1. Dick Wilson as Mr. Potter. Notes: Filmed August 7, 1970.; The Stephenses stay at the Hawthorne Motor Hotel in Salem for five episodes.
204	4	"Samantha's Hot Bedwarmer: Part 2"	William Asher	Ed Jurist	October 15, 1970
Samantha and Darrin let the police officers in their hotel room. The bedwarmer shows itself and Darrin is arrested. The officers are surprised when the bedwarmer moves by itself. Sam goes to the Witches Council Meeting hoping to find someone that knows who put the spell on the bedwarmer. With Endora's help, they should soon know who it was. Sam pops into the jail to tell Darrin the news. In the same cell is Mr. Potter, the drunk. He tries to tell the officer what he saw, but Sam is gone by then. Sam discovers it was Serena who cast the spell. Because it was so long ago, Serena does not remember the spell. Endora sends her back to old Salem to refresh her memory. It turns out it was a warlock named Newton (Noam Pitlik) that she turned into the bedwarmer. She did it to stop his unwanted advances. Serena will only allow Sam to free Newton from his bedwarmer prison on the condition that Newton not contact her. Considering the bedwarmer is missing and with a little magic from Sam, the case is dropped against Darrin. Sam get Newton to focus his interest toward Miss Ferndale. Parley Baer as Desk Sergeant. Bill Zuckert as Judge Ferguson. George DeNormand as Warlock. Virginia Hawkins as Witch. Note: Filmed July 16, 1970, partially on location in Salem, Massachusetts.
205	5	"Darrin on a Pedestal"	William Asher	Bernie Kahn	October 22, 1970
Darrin feels bad that he left the Barrows Umbrella account in Larry's hands. Samantha says that their sightseeing tour of Gloucester, Massachusetts will make him feel better. But then, Sam is called to an emergency meeting of the Witches Council. Serena pops in and says she will go sightseeing with Darrin. Darrin is railroaded into going. Darrin and Serena stop at the Gloucester Fisherman's Memorial statue. Darrin gets upset when Serena transforms the Fisherman (Robert Brown) to life. The Fisherman is immediately attracted to Serena. Darrin gives Serena an ultimatum and she zaps Darrin in the statue's place. Serena and the Fisherman leave together and Sam shows up and sees Darrin as the statue. Problems arise when Larry shows up looking for Darrin to make a new pitch to potential client, Mr. Barrows (John Gallaudet). Larry sees the statue and says it looks like Darrin. Larry, Barrows and Sam go to lunch hoping to meet Darrin there. Sam has to be in several places at the same time. She needs to make sure nothing happens to the statue of Darrin. Then she sees that Serena and the Fisherman have joined Larry and Barrows. Barrows says that if Darrin does not arrive soon, he is leaving with his account. Sam gets Serena to switch Darrin and the Fisherman. With Sam's help, Darrin gets the Barrows account. Jud Strunk as Maitre d'. Note: Filmed July 16, 1970, partially on location in Gloucester, Massachusetts.
206	6	"Paul Revere Rides Again"	Richard Michaels	Henry Sharp & Phil Sharp	October 29, 1970
Larry sends Samantha and Darrin a replica Paul Revere teapot and they wonder what Larry is up to. Esmeralda pops by just to check on things. She offers to take the packages of things Sam bought back with her. Esmeralda inadvertently also takes the teapot. Larry drops by and, despite Darrin being on vacation, wants Darrin to do some work. He would like Darrin to meet up with British client Sir Leslie Bancroft (Jonathan Harris), owner of British Imperial Textiles. Apparently Bancroft is a Revolutionary War buff and Larry wants Darrin to give him the teapot. Darrin refuses to do any work, so Larry says he will take the teapot. Just then Darrin notices the teapot is missing. Sam gets ahold of Esmeralda. While trying to return the teapot to Salem, Esmeralda conjures up the real Paul Revere (Bert Convy) instead. Larry, Darrin and Bancroft return to the hotel room. Revere mistakes Bancroft for a British invader. Esmeralda makes another mistake and now there's a horse in the room that Revere is in. Sam makes an excuse for who Revere is and he goes riding off out of the hotel. Darrin tries to say it was all part of an advertising campaign. Bancroft is not impressed and leaves. Revere gets arrested and Sam zaps him out of jail. Sam shows Revere a statue of him and Revere is honored. The teapot really was his and he puts his mark on it and gives it to Sam. Esmeralda manages to send him back. With Sam's help, Bancroft gives Darrin and Larry his account. Ron Masak as Clancey. Jud Strunk as Bellboy. Note: Filmed August 13, 1970.
207	7	"Samantha's Bad Day in Salem"	William Asher	Michael Morris	November 5, 1970
At the Witches' Convention, Samantha runs into a childhood friend named Waldo (Hal England). What Sam does not realize is that Waldo has been in love with her all these years. Waldo conjures up his fantasy replica of Sam. Mirabelle (Anne Seymour), Waldo's mother, chastises him for still pining for Sam. Meanwhile, Larry comes by Darrin's hotel room asking about the Blakely account. Larry tries to talk Darrin into going to see Blakely, but Darrin says he is on vacation. Larry then thinks Sam is having an affair when he sees Waldo and Fake Sam together. Larry hears Fake Sam profess her love for Waldo. Sam joins Darrin and Larry for lunch. Waldo suddenly arrives and Sam says they are old friends. Larry says he is not feeling well and leaves. Sam has Darrin go after him. Waldo tells Sam he just wanted to meet Darrin and see what she sees in him. Larry tells Darrin that he saw Sam and Waldo together, but it may have been someone that looked like Sam. One misunderstanding after another arises, leading Waldo to turn Darrin into a crow. Sam confronts Endora thinking she did it to Darrin. Waldo changes Darrin back. Waldo eventually explains everything to Darrin. They figure out a way to explain it to Larry by saying the other Sam was Serena. Note: Filmed July 16, 1970, partially on location in Salem, Massachusetts.
208	8	"Samantha's Old Salem Trip"	Richard Michaels	Ed Jurist	November 12, 1970
Samantha and Darrin return home early when the Witches Council forbids Sam from being seen with her husband in public. Sam is mad at the council. Esmeralda intercepts a message from the council that states Sam must return to Salem immediately. Fearing Sam will refuse because she is mad, Esmeralda decides to send her back herself. Esmeralda accidentally sends Sam to 17th century Salem, during the time of the witch hunts. Mrs. Farley (Maudie Prickett) takes Sam into her home because of the way she is dressed. Sam does not remember who she is and has no powers. Meanwhile, Endora comes looking for Sam at home. She figures out what Esmeralda mistakenly had done. Endora sends Darrin to rescue Sam with a special coin that will restore her powers. Mrs. Farley has Sam work as a barmaid in her husband's (James Westerfield) tavern. Darrin tries talking to Sam, but she wants nothing to do with him. The Magistrate (Ronald Long) puts Darrin in the stockade. Both Darrin and Sam are accused of being witches, because Sam gave Mr. Farley Darrin's ballpoint pen. They are put on trial. Darrin is able to get Sam to use the coin and she regains her memory. Sam lectures the court about how they convicted innocent people of being witches. Joseph V. Perry as Luther. John Mitchum as Guard #2. Notes: Filmed August 6, 1970.; During the courtroom scene, Samantha's wrists are in chains before she performs a spell with a coin, but are free during the performance.
209	9	"Samantha's Pet Warlock"	Richard Michaels	Jerry Mayer	November 19, 1970
Endora tells Samantha that she ran into Ashley Flynn (Noam Pitlik). Suddenly Ashley pops in. Ashley has always had a thing for Sam, but she was never interested. Sam asks Ashley to leave. Meanwhile, Darrin and Larry are talking to potential client, Charlie Gibbons (Edward Andrews) of Gibbons Dog Food. Charlie judges a man by the kind of dog he has. Darrin pretends he owns a dog and he and Larry try to describe it. Ashley is listening in on the conversation. Darrin and Larry go to the dog pound and speak with the Dog Pound Attendant (David Huddleston). Ashley turns himself into the dog Darrin described and Darrin brings it home. Sam figures out the dog is Ashley. After Ashley changes back, Sam introduces him to Darrin. Larry calls Darrin and tells him that Gibbons wants to come by to see the dog. Sam turns Ashley back into the dog. She lets him go outside because he promised not to ran away. Ashley causes some problems for Gladys Kravitz. Larry and Gibbons come by. At first Ashley causes some problems for Darrin, but he does wind up helping Darrin win the account. Notes: Filmed August 20, 1970.; Partial remake of the Season 2 episode "Man's Best Friend".
210	10	"Samantha's Old Man"	Richard Michaels	Michael Morris	December 3, 1970
Endora pops by wanting Samantha to go with her to a costume ball. Sam says she has things to do around the house. Darrin comes in saying he finally broke 80 playing golf. Endora changes Darrin into an 80 year old man to prove to Sam that their marriage is doomed to fail. To take Darrin's mind off of what happened, Sam suggests going to a drive-in movie. Running into Larry and Louise at the drive-in, they pass off Darrin as his grandfather, Grover Stephens. This prompts Louise to fix up Grover with her visiting Aunt Millicent (Ruth McDevitt). Sam and Darrin wind up back at Larry's house and they continue to try and get "Grover" and Millicent together. The next day, Darrin needs to pull off a youth-based campaign with new client Jennings Booker (Edward Platt). Sam says what's the difference what Darrin looks like and he should still go to the meeting. Darrin is with Booker at a restaurant and Darrin goes to call Sam. Booker is a little surprised as he thought Darrin was much younger. Things get complicated when Larry shows up. Darrin pretends to be Grover and tells Larry he was just filling in for Darrin who is sick. Grover pitches what he says was Darrin's campaign idea and Booker loves it. Back at the house, Larry, Louise and Millicent come by and Millicent is still interested in Grover. Sam changes herself into elderly Carolyn (Hope Summers) posing as Grover's wife. Finding out Grover was married all along makes Millicent want to leave. Later, Sam finds a way to show Darrin they will be able to grow old together. Endora changes Darrin back. Notes: Filmed August 27, 1970.; Nominated for an Emmy Award for Best Makeup.
211	11	"The Corsican Cousins"	Richard Michaels	Ed Jurist	December 10, 1970
Darrin comes home and tells Samantha that he and Larry let Mr. Langley win at golf. Langley invited Darrin and Sam to join his country club. Because Langley is a potential client, Sam agrees to join. Darrin's mentions that Sam will have to entertain Mrs. Langley and Mrs. Hunter (Ann Doran), the country club women's admissions chair and co-chair. Endora suddenly pops in. Endora tries to persuade Sam to be as fun-loving as Serena, but Sam is not interested. Endora casts a spell that makes Sam experience everything Serena does. Larry comes by. When Serena's date Clark (Robert Wolders) gives Serena a foot massage that tickles her, Sam finds herself in a very ticklish situation. Other things that Serena does affect Sam and she does not know what's going on. A complication sets in when Mrs. Langley and Mrs. Hunter show up early to the house. Meanwhile, Serena finds out that Clark is married and gets upset with men. Sam now feels the same way. Larry comes by again and Sam is very rude to him and Darrin. Because of Serena, Sam cries in front of the ladies and then acts drunk. Sam insults Mrs. Hunter and the women want to leave. Sam's giggling behavior could not only ruin their chances of getting into the country club, but also ruin Darrin's chances of getting Langley's lucrative account. Something in Langley's past has him in a scandal and Larry is now happy that they did not get involved with him. Note: Filmed September 3, 1970.
212	12	"Samantha's Magic Potion"	William Asher	Shirley Gordon	December 17, 1970
Darrin is in a professional slump. His latest client, Mr. Harmon (Charles Lane) of Harmon Savings and Loan, has disapproved of his last three campaign ideas. Darrin asks Samantha if Endora has put a spell on him. At the office, Harmon rejects Darrin's fourth campaign idea. Back at home, Endora denies doing anything to Darrin. Sam summons Dr. Bombay. Bombay thinks there is a spell on Darrin, but he cannot figure out who did it. A discouraged Darrin tells Sam that he wants to retire and live by witchcraft. Sam tells him that she spoke to all her relatives and no one put a spell on him. Plus Bombay admits he may have made a mistake. Darrin still wants to retire. Sam tells him with her witchcraft, Stephens and Tate could be the biggest advertising agency in the world. Sam gives Darrin a placebo potion to boost his creativity and give him confidence. Darrin tells Larry that he wants to pitch his last campaign to Harmon one more time. At first Harmon still is not interested, but when Darrin confidently goes over the campaign again, Harmon is sold. Back at home, Darrin is not as happy as he thought he would be knowing that witchcraft will have him doing no wrong. Sam tells him the potion was fake, so witchcraft had nothing to do with it, it was all him. Note: Filmed September 24, 1970.; Partial remake of the season 1 episode "A is for Aardvark" and the season 4 episode "The No-Harm Charm".
213	13	"Sisters at Heart"	William Asher	Story by : Jefferson High School (Los Angeles) 5th Period English class Teleplay by : William Asher & Barbara Avedon	December 24, 1970
It's a few days before Christmas. Black couple Keith and Dorothy Wilson (Don Marshall and Janee Michelle) come by the house with their daughter Lisa (Venetta Rogers). Keith and Dorothy are going out of town on business and Lisa will stay with the Stephenses. Tabitha is excited about having a new "sister" to play with. Meanwhile, client Mr. Brockway (Parley Baer) wants to check out Darrin's home-life. Brockway makes a surprise stop at Darrin's house. Lisa answers the door and Brockway is stunned to see she is a black girl. Brockway misunderstands and thinks Lisa is Darrin's daughter and that Darrin is in an interracial marriage. While trying to remove some spilled paint on Lisa's dress, Tabitha turns her into a white girl. Tabitha explains that she is a witch and changes Lisa back. To prove it, Tabitha turns herself into a black girl and back again. Darrin learns that Brockway came by and now wants Darrin off the account because he does not think Darrin is stable. Darrin thinks one of Sam's relatives had something to do with it. When Tabitha wants to be real sisters with Lisa, she casts a spell so they have matching polka-dots on their bodies. Tabitha cannot change them back. Larry wants to have the Christmas office party at Darrin's house. Brockway agreed to come. That evening, Keith and Dorothy arrive to pick up Lisa and instead will join the party. Brockway arrives and thinks Dorothy is Darrin's wife. Sam finds a way to get Lisa and Tabitha back to normal. And Mr. Brockway gets taught an important lesson. Notes: Filmed November 12, 1970.; In the special opening of the show as originally broadcast (available on the DVD release), Montgomery welcomes us to the Christmas episode which was written by the students of the 5th period, room 309, 10th grade English class at Thomas Jefferson High School in Los Angeles. Montgomery also wishes us a happy holiday before the closing credits.; The episode received the Governor's Award at the 23rd Primetime Emmy Awards in May 1971.
214	14	"Mother-in-Law of the Year"	William Asher	Henry Sharp & Phil Sharp	January 14, 1971
Darrin shows Samantha he latest idea for his client, Bernard Bobbins (John McGiver) of Bobbins Bonbons. Endora pops in and suggests giving Bobbins Bonbons on Mothers-in-Law Day. Meanwhile, Bobbins is with Larry and he is not happy. He sponsors one of the most popular shows on television, The Sweetheart Parade, yet his candy sales are not increasing. Bobbins is questioning whether Larry's agency is doing a good job. Darrin comes by. Endora places a spell on Darrin to pitch the idea of creating a Mothers-in-Law Day with Bobbins Bonbons the gift of choice. Bobbins loves the idea. At home, Darrin tells Sam what Endora did. Bobbins and Larry come by the house. Bobbins suggests making it Mother-in-Law of the Year and announcing the winner on the show. Endora casts another spell to make Bobbins pick her. Endora tells Sam and Darrin she has something else to do and will not show up for the commercial. Sam suggests to Darrin that she could turn herself into her mother. Bobbins and Larry are panicking because it's almost show time and Endora is not there. Just then Darrin shows up with Sam. Maxwell (Robert Q. Lewis), the Director, shows Sam what she will be doing during the commercial. Things get complicated when Endora returns. The commercial starts and Endora pops in as Sam and causes some problems. But Bobbins actually likes the way things turned out. Jim Lange as Jim the M.C. Note: Filmed October 1, 1970.
215	15	"Mary the Good Fairy: Part 1"	William Asher	Ed Jurist	January 21, 1971
Mary the Good Fairy (Imogene Coca), a friend of Samantha's, visits the Stephens household when Tabitha loses a tooth. Darrin and Sam give her a snifter of brandy to warm her up. Mary has several more drinks and becomes quite intoxicated. Sam tells Mary she still has a long list of children to visit. Sam now has to fulfill Mary's duties for the night. Mary turns Sam into a Good Fairy. Gladys sees Sam outside flying with her fairy wings. In the morning, Mary reveals to Sam that she is tired of collecting lost teeth for centuries on end and refuses to trade places with her. Tabitha sees Sam dressed as the Good Fairy and Sam tells her to keep it a secret. Sam tells Darrin that she is stuck being the fairy for the time being. Gladys, Abner and nephew Sydney come by. Darrin introduces Mary as Sam's Aunt. Soon, Darrin and Sam realize Mary is gone. Note: Filmed September 11, 1970.
216	16	"The Good Fairy Strikes Again: Part 2"	William Asher	Ed Jurist	January 28, 1971
Darrin is having a hard time working on an ad campaign for client Mr. Ferber's (Herb Voland) product, the Reducilator. And Samantha still having the fairy wings and Mary the Good Fairy (Imogene Coca) having a hangover, isn't helping. Mary refuses to take her duties back from Sam. Sam talks to Mary, but Mary will only cooperate if Darrin unlocks the Brandy. Sam then learns that Mary left the house. Gladys invites Mary in and gives her some Brandy. A drunken Mary wanders the neighborhood and is picked up by the police (Vic Tayback and Paul Smith). Sam learns from Gladys what happened to Mary. Darrin gets Mary from the Police station. Larry and Ferber arrive early to Darrin's house and Darrin says he's not ready yet. Sam dressed as the Good Fairy does wind up helping Darrin with his add campaign. And a little spilled Bloody Mary cocktail on Sam gets Mary to become the Good Fairy again. Note: Filmed September 17, 1970.
217	17	"The Return of Darrin the Bold"	Richard Michaels	Ed Jurist	February 4, 1971
Endora is tired of Samantha being denied her witchly heritage. Endora and Serena decide to turn Darrin into a warlock. The two consult a witch guru (Burt Mustin). They will have Serena go back to 14th century Ireland and slip a potion to his ancestor, Darrin the Bold, making him a warlock. Back to the present, Darrin wishes for things and he gets them. Darrin figures one of Sam's relatives put a spell on him. Endora tells Sam she didn't put a spell on Darrin. Endora says Darrin is in the first stages of "wishcraft". As a result of Darrin's frequent exposure to magic, witchcraft has rubbed off on him. Sam discovers what Serena has really done and goes back to the time of Darrin the Bold to undo the spell. It takes a little bit of doing as Darrin the Bold is making advances at Sam, but she gets the job done. Sam comes back to the present. Now that Darrin's powers are gone, Sam has to use her witchcraft to help Darrin when he gets into an altercation with Mr. Ferguson (Richard X. Slattery), a neighbor. Gordon Jump as Bartender. Nada Rowand as Servant Girl. David Huddleston as Dave. Notes: Filmed November 25, 1970.; Darrin's ancestor, Darrin the Bold, first appeared in the Season 3 episode "A Most Unusual Wood Nymph".
218	18	"The House That Uncle Arthur Built"	Richard Michaels	Bernie Kahn	February 11, 1971
Uncle Arthur pops in and pulls some practical jokes on Darrin. Before he leaves for the office, Darrin reminds Samantha that Larry, client Lionel Rockfield (J. Edward McKinley) and his wife (Ysabel MacCloskey) will be coming to dinner. Darrin would like Arthur gone by then. Arthur tells Sam that those will be the last of his practical jokes. He is in love with a witch named Aretha (Barbara Rhoades). Arthur introduces Aretha to Sam. Sam finds Aretha to be a bit pretentious. Arthur tells Sam that Aretha hates practical jokes. Arthur can't help himself and pulls a joke on Aretha and she leaves. To win Aretha back, Arthur places his practical jokes within the walls of the Stephenses' house. The house starts pulling jokes on Sam and Darrin. Their guests arrive and more jokes happen. Sam finally gets a hold of Arthur and Aretha. Aretha sees the jokes happening in the house and breaks up with Arthur. But, those practical jokes do help Darrin win the account. Notes: Filmed October 15, 1970.; Paul Lynde's final appearance as Uncle Arthur.
219	19	"Samantha and the Troll"	William Asher	Lila Garrett & Joel Rapp	February 18, 1971
Samantha tries to use her magic to clean a mess Tabitha made, but it doesn't work. Serena comes by and tells Sam she may need a "10,000 spell overhaul". Sam asks Serena to babysit. Sam tells Darrin she'll probably be gone until late that evening. Larry comes by and tells Darrin he's arranged a meeting with Roland Berkley (Bob Cummings) of Berkley's Hair Tonic. Darrin doesn't think they should go after that account. Larry tells Darrin that the Berkley's will be coming by for dinner. Serena impersonates Sam and tells Larry she'd love to have the Berkley's over. At the office, Berkley tells Darrin and Larry he expects a slogan that will sell his tonic to the youth market by that evening. Meanwhile, Serena brings Tabitha's toys to life for a game of hide and seek. Darrin comes home and Serena turns the toys back, except one that was hiding. Larry, Berkley and his wife Martha (Nan Martin) arrive. Serena, as Sam, is overly affectionate to both Darrin and Berkley. And this, of course, is very annoying to Martha. Darrin and the real Samantha, upon her return, have to somehow explain things to Martha. It turns out that Martha's jealousy actually brings her and Roland closer. They then see the furry troll doll that Serena didn't change back. Darrin uses the troll as part of the Berkley campaign and Berkley loves it. Notes: Filmed October 8, 1970.; Diane Murphy appears as the rag doll. Felix Silla appears as the troll.
220	20	"This Little Piggie"	Richard Michaels	Ed Jurist	February 25, 1971
Darrin can't make up his mind between the two jingles he wrote for Colonel Bringham's (Herb Edelman) Succulent Spareribs. Endora pops in and says that is why Darrin is unsuccessful, because he can't make up his mind. Endora casts a hex upon Darrin which makes him indecisive. Samantha quickly learns about the spell and works at getting a hold of her mother to remove it. At the office, Larry notices Darrin's indecisiveness. Darrin is late for his meeting with Bringham and Bringham is not happy. Sam comes by the office, but because he has to go to the meeting, she isn't able to tell Darrin about the spell. Darrin's second guessing things doesn't help his meeting with Bringham, who values a good sales pitch from his advertising men. Darrin comes home and Sam finally gets a hold of Endora. Endora takes the spell off. But Endora decides Darrin is "pigheaded" and proves it by zapping a pig head onto him. And he winds up on the roof of the house. Just then, Larry and Bringham show up and see Darrin on the roof. The pig head actually helps Darrin win the account. After Darrin apologizes to Endora, she removes the pig head. Ysabel MacCloskey as Aunt Hagatha. Ann Doran as Secretary Betty. Allen Jenkins as Janitor. Note: Filmed November 5, 1970.
221	21	"Mixed Doubles"	William Asher	Richard Baer	March 4, 1971
Samantha spends a restless night thinking about Louise Tate's troubles. In the morning, Sam wakes up in Larry's bedroom. Despite Sam looking like herself, Larry thinks she is Louise. Sam checks back at her house. Louise, despite looking like herself, thinks she is Sam and Darrin thinks so also. Endora brings Dr. Bombay to see Sam. Endora says that it's a clear case of metaphysical molecular disturbance. Bombay confirms the diagnosis and it effects mortals who come in contact with a witch who is a cosmic carrier. When Bombay treats Sam, that should cure the others. Bombay's first attempt at a cure doesn't work. It will take some time to develop the next cure. Sam manages to convince Darrin of the problem. While Dr. Bombay works on a cure, Sam has to orchestrate two new marital relationships with no hanky-panky. She also has to keep Larry and Louise from wondering if their marriage is on the rocks in the process. Bombay's next cure also doesn't work. When Sam tells Bombay about her initial restless night, he figures out what to do and this time the cure works. Note: Filmed January 7, 1971.
222	22	"Darrin Goes Ape"	Richard Michaels	Leo Townsend & Pauline Townsend	March 11, 1971
Serena comes by with a present for Darrin as a peace offering. At first Darrin thanks Serena, but then he rejects the gift when he learns it was created with witchcraft. Serena leaves angry. Samantha goes out shopping with the kids. Serena turns herself into Sam and tries to tell Darrin that Serena meant well. Darrin still insults Serena and she turns back into herself. Serena changes Darrin into a gorilla (Janos Prohaska). Gladys Kravitz sees the gorilla in the house and gets Abner. Serena changes Darrin back and Abner looks in the window and now thinks Gladys is crazy. When Darrin won't apologize to Serena, she turns him into the gorilla again. Gladys calls the police and Officers Jerry (Paul Smith) and John (Sidney Clute) arrive. The Police Sergeant (Herb Vigran) calls Alex (Allen Jenkins) and Pete Johnson (Milton Selzer) of Johnson's Jungle Isle. They capture the gorilla to mate with their female gorilla. Sam comes home and Gladys tell her about the gorilla. Sam zaps the gorilla back home. The police and the Johnson's arrive again looking for the gorilla. Sam zaps the gorilla onto the roof. Sam gets Serena to turn the gorilla back into Darrin. Notes: Filmed December 3, 1970.; The last episode featuring Abner Kravitz.
223	23	"Money Happy Returns"	Richard Michaels	Milt Rosen	March 18, 1971
Tabitha and Adam are playing in a small rubber pool. They ask Samantha when they are going to get large swimming pool. Endora accuses Darrin of being cheap. Larry and Darrin take a cab to the office. The Cabbie (Allen Jenkins) tells Darrin he left an envelope in the back seat. Darrin finds $100,000 in the envelope and thinks Endora zapped it there so his children can have the pool he cannot afford. Meanwhile, Rudolph Kosko (Arch Johnson) finds the cab and tells the Cabbie he left an envelope. The Cabbie points out Darrin leaving the building and they follow him. Darrin comes home and shows Sam the money. He even accuses Sam of covering up for her mother. An angry Sam zaps the money away and then leaves. Kosko comes to the door and demands the envelope. Darrin doesn't know that Kosko is a crook. He tries to explain that the money isn't here anymore. Sam comes back and asks Kosko where he got the money. Kosko's partner, Mr. Braun (Karl Lukas), shows up. Larry comes by and thinks the men are with another advertising agency. Larry offers Darrin a raise and a bonus to stay with him. Sam uses a little magic to get Kosko and Braun arrested. Darrin tells Larry the truth and loses his raise and bonus. Gordon Jump as Police Officer #1. Note: Filmed February 1, 1971.
224	24	"Out of the Mouths of Babes"	Richard Michaels	Michael Morris	March 25, 1971
Darrin had planned on playing golf. Larry comes by because potential client Sean Flanagan (David Huddleston), of Mother Flanagan's Irish stew, has moved up their meeting to the next day. Darrin now has to get a weeks worth of work done that day. Endora wants to take Tabitha to some Unicorn races, but Darrin says no. Endora turns Darrin into a little boy, but he still has his adult voice. When he refuses to apologize, Endora leaves. Larry comes back and Samantha says the boy is Darrin's nephew, Marvin Peter (Gene Andrusco). Darrin befriends a neighborhood boy named Herbie (Eric Scott). Herbie tries some of the Irish stew and reveals the truth, it tastes terrible. Darrin apologizes to Endora and she changes him back. Darrin has to convince Larry to not pursue the Flanagan account. Even after tasting the stew, Larry still wants the account. The next day, Flanagan comes to the house. Sam comes up with an idea. She turns Darrin back into Marvin and the boy tells Flanagan that the stew tastes bad. Flanagan, knowing the recipe was his Mother's, now remembers hating it as a child. Sam suggests to Flanagan that he sell the remaining stock of stew as dog food. Flanagan actually likes the idea. Note: Filmed February 5, 1971.
225	25	"Samantha's Psychic Pslip"	Richard Michaels	John L. Greene	April 1, 1971
Darrin's mother Phyllis calls Samantha saying she's close and wants to stop by. She thought her and Sam could do a little shopping. The kitchen is a mess, so Sam uses magic to clean things up. Darrin catches her and she apologizes. Darrin was going to give Sam a bracelet because she hasn't used witchcraft in a while. Sam feels guilty when he insists she take it. Sam hiccups and it causes bikes of all kinds to appear. Sam can't make the bikes disappear. Phyllis arrives and they make up an excuse for the bikes. Sam calls Dr. Bombay. Bombay's spell, designed to remove "guilt", stops the bikes from appearing. But now Sam's hiccups cause any "gilded" object nearby to disappear. After Sam and Phyllis leave to go shopping, Serena appears and calls for Bombay. Bombay realizes the spell went bad and tries to locate Sam. Things get complicated when Larry stops by. Further problems arise when Sam's hiccup causes a gilded necklace in a store display to disappear. Sam and Phyllis are then questioned by the department store detective for shoplifting. Bombay cures Sam and the necklace reappears. Darrin upsets Serena and she turns him into a little goat. Notes: Filmed November 19, 1970.; In the closing credits, Irene Byatt is identified as "Woman with Mirror" when actually she played a woman with a lamp. Irwin Charone appears as the department store detective.
226	26	"Samantha's Magic Mirror"	Richard Michaels	Ed Jurist	April 8, 1971
Esmeralda comes by to see Samantha. Esmeralda needs confidence for an upcoming meeting with old boyfriend Ferdy (Tom Bosley). Larry comes by and sees a baby elephant that Esmeralda conjured up when she sneezed. Larry had a fight with Louise and he wants to stay at Darrin's house until his flight to Chicago that evening. Darrin asks Sam to get rid of Esmeralda before she zaps something else into the house. Sam dresses Esmeralda up and has Darrin compliment her. Sam creates magic mirrors to make Esmeralda appear more attractive to herself. Esmeralda tells Sam and Darrin that her date with Ferdy will be here in the house. A confident Esmeralda now flirts with Larry. Larry panics and he and Darrin leave. Esmeralda tells Sam she needs even more assistance to boost her failed powers. Ferdy arrives. Sam sticks around behind the scenes to assist with Esmeralda's faulty witchcraft. What Esmeralda doesn't know is that Ferdy's powers are failing as well. He has his Nephew hiding outside and he's helping with the magic. A policeman asks the Nephew what he's doing outside the house and the Nephew disappears. Sam is on the phone with Darrin and she can't help Esmeralda. Esmeralda zaps up some mistakes. With the Nephew gone, Ferdy admits to Esmeralda about his failing magic. The couple tell Sam they're engaged. Nancy Priddy as Esmeralda's Mirror Image. Notes: Filmed January 21, 1971.; Remake of the Season 2 episode "Aunt Clara's Old Flame".
227	27	"Laugh Clown, Laugh"	William Asher	Ed Jurist	April 15, 1971
Endora arrives in the house riding a camel. Something Darrin says causes Endora to say he has no sense of humor. At the office, Endora puts a spell on Darrin, turning him into an obnoxious comedian. When he tells some corny jokes to Betty (Marcia Wallace), his secretary, Darrin knows something isn't right. He tries to avoid going to a meeting with client Harold Jameson (Charles Lane), but Larry insists. Before Darrin arrives, Jameson tells Larry that he doesn't think Darrin is serious about his account. Darrin starts telling Jameson jokes and Larry kicks him out off the office. Darrin comes home and Endora takes the spell off. Darrin insults Endora and says he's going back to the office. She creates another spell, causing him to laugh about anything grave and serious. As he's pulling out of the driveway, Gladys tells him something serious and he starts laughing. Realizing what Endora did, Darrin goes back to the house. Larry calls and Sam tells him Darrin is sick. Larry brings Jameson and his wife Martha (Ysabel MacCloskey) by the house while driving them to the airport. Thanks to Darrin's laughter and Sam's help, they get the Jameson account. Notes: Filmed February 11, 1971.; The last episode to feature Gladys Kravitz.
228	28	"Samantha and the Antique Doll"	Richard Michaels	Ed Jurist	April 22, 1971
Darrin's mother, Phyllis, comes by for a visit and brings gifts for the kids. Tabitha gets an antique doll. Samantha tells Tabitha to let Adam play with it for a while. Tabitha causes the doll to fly across the room, right in front of Phyllis. Sam convinces Phyllis that she subconsciously willed the doll away from Adam, using mind over matter. Phyllis tries to make the doll come to her and Sam uses magic to make it happen. Back at her house, Phyllis becomes obsessed with her apparent new abilities. Frank thinks she's crazy. Frank and Phyllis go back to Sam's house. Sam tries to tell Phyllis that these powers come and go and hers are now gone. Phyllis says she's been doing some research and there's some object that gives her the power. She believes it's the doll. Sam tries to frighten Phyllis into stopping to use her powers by changing Frank into a mule. That plan doesn't quite work. A fake séance to conjure up Phyllis' Grandmother gets Phyllis to promise to never use her powers again. Sam has Phyllis tell Frank she loves him and he changes back to himself. Later, Darrin says something about Endora and he's turned into a goose. Notes: Filmed December 10, 1970.; Remake of the season 1 episode "Abner Kadabra".; The last episode featuring Darrin's parents. Robert F. Simon, who portrayed Frank Stephens in seasons 1–3, reprises his role.

=== Season 8 (1971–72) ===
No. overall	No. in season	Title	Directed by	Written by	Original release date
229	1	"How Not to Lose Your Head to King Henry VIII (Part 1)"	William Asher	Ed Jurist	September 15, 1971
Samantha and Darrin are vacationing in England. While on a tour of the Tower of London, Sam sees a nobleman trapped in a painting. Sam learns from him that a witch placed him in the painting for 1000 years. The nobleman begs Sam to release him from the painting, which she does. Malvina (Arlene Martel), the hateful witch who trapped him, gets Sam to put him back in the painting. She then sends Sam back in time to the court of King Henry VIII (Ronald Long). The Lord Chamberlain (Ivor Barry) finds Sam and brings her in the castle with a bunch of minstrels. Sam doesn't remember who she is and has no powers. Meanwhile, Endora has found out what happened to Sam and tells Darrin. Sam and the minstrels entertain the King. The King is quite taken with Sam. Endora tells Darrin that he must travel to the sixteenth century and rescue Sam by kissing her. The King would like to make Sam his wife, but she tries to put him off. Laurie Main as the Tour Guide. Notes: Filmed on June 29, 1971, along with Part 2.; Beginning with this episode, Bewitched was moved from Thursday night to Wednesday, opposite CBS's The Carol Burnett Show.
230	2	"How Not to Lose Your Head to King Henry VIII (Part 2)"	William Asher	Ed Jurist	September 22, 1971
Endora has sent Darrin back to 16th-century England to rescue Samantha. Darrin must do this before King Henry VIII adds her to his gallery of beheaded wives. Darrin manages to find Sam and the King and pretends to be a pastry boy. The King presents Sam with the jewels of his last wife. The Lord Chamberlain wants to speak with the King privately. Darrin tries to get Sam to remember him and give him a kiss. The King has Darrin thrown into the dungeon. Darrin is afraid to admit that he now requires Endora's assistance in the matter. Endora arrives, but tells Darrin she only has the power to get here and back, no other. As such, Darrin and Endora will only have their cunning as their tools. Endora hypnotizes the Jailor (John Mitchum) and frees Darrin. Endora has plan with which Darrin may not totally agree with as his life will be in jeopardy. Darrin competes in a wrestling match with Henry the VIII. Sam gets upset when the King causes Darrin to lose consciousness. Sam kisses Darrin and remembers who she is. The three return to present day. Gilchrist Stuart as Courtier. Paul Ryan as Page. Ethelreda Leopold as Woman on Tour. Notes: Filmed on June 29, 1971, along with Part 1.; Elizabeth Montgomery sings "Of All The Gay Birds That E'er I Did See".
231	3	"Samantha and the Loch Ness Monster"	William Asher	Michael Morris	September 29, 1971
Darrin and Samantha are visiting the town of Inverness, Scotland. They are staying at a small hotel owned by Darrin's cousin Robbie (Don Knight). While on a picnic, Robbie complains that business has been slow because there haven't been any sightings of the Loch Ness Monster. Just then the Monster appears in Loch Ness. Sam knows the Monster is actually a warlock named Bruce (Steve Franken) who was transformed into the Monster by Serena 40 years earlier. Serena did it because Bruce kept making unwanted advances toward her. The next day Robbie calls in a specialist, the Baron von Fuchs (Bernie Kopell), to take photographs of the Monster. The Baron reveals to Sam and Darrin that he is actually here because there is a $3 million reward for the Monster's capture. Sam tells Darrin about Bruce. Worried that Bruce may be killed, Sam asks Serena to change Bruce back into a warlock. Darrin, Sam and Serena go to Loch Ness to find Bruce. After Serena turns Bruce back, he turns her into a mermaid. Sam zaps them back to the hotel room. Sam gets Bruce to admit that he is a flop as a warlock, but a hit as the Monster. Bruce turns Serena back and she turns him back into the Monster. The Monster gets the Baron to give up trying to capture him. Note: Filmed July 22, 1971.
232	4	"Samantha's Not So Leaning Tower of Pisa"	William Asher	Ed Jurist	October 6, 1971
Samantha and Darrin are in Pisa, Italy. Sam hears from Esmeralda who says she can't babysit the kids anymore and she got Aunt Hagatha to watch them. Esmeralda suddenly appears in front of Sam and Darrin all depressed. Several things went wrong while she was babysitting. Larry drops by with Count Bracini to discuss how to market his olive oil in the States. Things get a little confusing when Esmeralda fades in and out. They all go sightseeing. Esmeralda gains some confidence when the Count pays a lot of attention to her. Esmeralda reveals to Sam that she had caused the Tower of Pisa to lean in the 12th century, and has always been upset about her mistake. She used to date the architect, Bonano Pisano. She makes it stand upright, setting off mass hysteria. Sam and Esmeralda go back in time to see Bonano. Esmeralda figures out how she originally made the Tower lean and does it again. Sam and Esmeralda go back to the present. Instead of talking business, the Count wants to celebrate with Esmeralda and she feels much better. Steve Conte as Priest. Note: Filmed July 2, 1971.
233	5	"Bewitched, Bothered and Baldoni"	William Asher	Michael Morris	October 13, 1971
Samantha and Darrin are now in Rome and are visiting the National Museum. Endora suddenly pops by. Darrin leaves to get ready for a business lunch. Endora tells Sam that she's concerned that Darrin may have a wandering eye with all the beautiful women in Rome. Sam is not worried. Endora hopes to make trouble for Darrin by bringing to life a statue of Venus (most likely a reproduction of Venus Callipyge). She takes the name Vanessa. Darrin is alone at a restaurant when Vanessa shows up. She offers to take him sightseeing. Despite having the business lunch soon, Darrin, who smitten with Vanessa, agrees to go with her. Darrin brings her back to the villa wanting to have her work as their maid. Sam instantly knows that Vanessa is other worldly and that Endora probably had something to do with it. Larry comes by with client Ernesto Baldoni and his wife Isabella (Penny Santon). The men become enchanted by Vanessa's appearance. Ernesto gets a call saying the statue of Venus de Milo has been stolen. Sam now knows who Vanessa is. She goes to the museum and brings the statue of Adonis to life. Sam brings Adonis to the villa and says his name is Alberto. Alberto and Vanessa immediately fall for each other. Sam and Endora turn the couple back into statues and send them to the museum. Al Molinaro as Guide. Note: Filmed July 12, 1971.
234	6	"Paris, Witches Style"	William Asher	Michael Morris	October 20, 1971
Darrin and Samantha are now in Paris. Sam sends a witch message back to Endora and the children showing them where they are. Darrin has to get some artwork for the meeting later that afternoon with the Europa Tour Company. Sam suggests that they should stop by and see Maurice in London. Darrin says he has take care of his business first and leaves. Endora pops in and tells Sam that Maurice knows they are in Europe. Maurice suddenly shows up very upset and he blames Darrin for Sam not visiting him. Endora zaps up a fake Darrin to appease an irate Maurice. This Darrin is kinder and more accommodating to Maurice. Darrin has brought him a painting as a gift. The real Darrin shows up and Endora manages to get rid of the fake one. When Maurice realizes what happened, he zaps Darrin onto the top of the Eiffel Tower. Sam gets Darrin back and asks him to apologize to Maurice. Darrin tells off Maurice and Maurice gets furious. Before he can do anything to Darrin, Endora, without Maurice knowing, turns Darrin into a bust sculpture. Maurice destroys the sculpture, but Sam makes him bring Darrin back. Sam gets Maurice to apologize to Darrin. Mr. Sagan (Maurice Marsac), from Europa Tours, comes by. Maurice helps Darrin win the account with Mr. Sagan. Notes: Filmed July 29, 1971.; Partial remake of the season 1 episode "Just One Happy Family".
235	7	"The Ghost Who Made a Spectre of Himself"	William Asher	Ed Jurist	October 27, 1971
Darrin complains to Samantha that this vacation was more business than relaxing. He's looking forward to going home that day. Larry comes by with Louise, who just flew in. Larry says he's accepted an invitation by the Duke of Winsett (Maurice Dallimore) to have the four of them stay at his old English castle for the weekend. One night at the castle, Sam finds a lovesick ghost named Harry (Patrick Horgan). He makes an advance at Sam and she turns him down. Longing to be near Sam, Harry takes up residence in Darrin's body and refuses to leave. Sam will not have anything to do with Darrin while Harry has taken over his body. Larry and Louise notice the fighting between Darrin and Sam. Larry says they should stay out of it, but Louise gets involved. Louise has Sam stay with her and tells Larry to stay with Darrin. The next morning, Darrin gets upset with the Duke when he makes some comments about the ghost in the castle. Darrin lets Harry's British accent slip through and leaves. When Louise goes to speak with Darrin, he makes a pass at her. Sam conjures up the ghost of Lady Windermere (Elizabeth Rogers) to lure Harry out of Darrin's body. Sam quickly tells Darrin what happened. Sam finds a way to make things right with Louise. Note: Filmed July 16, 1971.
236	8	"TV or Not TV"	William Asher	Bernie Kahn	November 3, 1971
Tabitha and Adam are watching the Steamboat Bill TV show. The show is sponsored by Darrin's client, toy manufacturer Lester Silverton (John Gallaudet). The next part of the show is a Punch and Judy segment. Adam starts hitting Tabitha the way Punch is hitting Judy. Tabitha wants Punch to stop what he's doing, so she zaps herself onto the show's stage. Darrin happens to be watching the show from his office and sees Tabitha. Larry tells Darrin that Silverton loved the little girl telling Punch to stop hitting Judy. Silverton wants her to be a permanent fixture on Punch and Judy. Darrin pretends that he doesn't know who the girl was. He lies and says an usher just picked her out of the audience. Later, Larry and Silverton come by the house. Because the little girl was an overnight sensation, they want to hold a contest to find her. Just then Tabitha comes in the room and Silverton recognizes her. While filming the Punch and Judy segment, Tabitha finds it's not as fun as she thought it would be. Sam uses a little magic to get Silverton to want to use his daughter Robin (Kathy Hilton) instead. Robert Q. Lewis as Director. Wanda Hendrix as Mrs. Helen Silverton. Note: Filmed June 17, 1971 (the first episode filmed for Season 8).
237	9	"A Plague on Maurice and Samantha"	Richard Michaels	Ed Jurist	November 10, 1971
Samantha tells Endora that she has lost her powers. Dr. Bombay assumes that her loss of powers is due to her constant contact with mortals. Endora warns Sam about how Maurice will take the news. Maurice will blame Darrin. Maurice makes a surprise visit and gives Sam a kiss. Darrin comes home and lets it slip to Maurice that Sam lost her powers. An angry Maurice tries to turn Darrin into a lizard, but it doesn't work. Dr. Bombay returns to inform them that he misdiagnosed the situation, and that Sam truly has a contagious bug that can be passed from witch to warlock. Maurice now has to sample mortal life after he lost his powers because he kissed Sam. Darrin brings Maurice to the office. Meanwhile, Dr. Bombay believes he has found the cure. Endora needs to zap Sam to see the Apothecary (Bernie Kopell). Darrin is pitching some campaigns to Mr. Benson (J. Edward McKinley) for the Benson Chili account. Benson is not impressed. Sam arrives with the medicine for Maurice. Before he takes the medicine, Maurice actually helps Darrin win the account. Note: Filmed August 12, 1971.
238	10	"Hansel and Gretel in Samanthaland"	Richard Michaels	Michael Morris	November 17, 1971
Samantha is reading Hansel & Gretel to Tabitha and Adam and mentions how the story book kids are hungry. Sam has to stop because she needs to prepare food for Larry and Louise's arrival. Tabitha pops Hansel & Gretel out of the book to give them something to eat. Sam sets out a plate of cheese puffs and Tabitha zaps them up to her room. Tabitha wants Hansel & Gretel to spend the night and have breakfast. She zaps herself into the story so she can ask their father, the Woodcutter, if they can stay. Sam discovers the two and learns Tabitha is in the storybook. Sam goes into the book to rescue Tabitha from the Wicked Witch (Billie Hayes). The Wicked Witch tells Sam she doesn't belong in this story and sends her away. The Witch actually has Tabitha in a cage. Meanwhile, Larry and Louise arrive. Hansel & Gretel have left the house in search of food. Sam finds Brunhilda (Bobo Lewis), Hansel & Gretel's Stepmother. Sam returns to the Witch and turns her into a Fairy Godmother. She agrees to give up Tabitha if Sam turns her back into a witch. The Police return Hansel & Gretel after they were taught stealing ice cream from a street vender. It takes a bit of doing, but Sam works things out with the Police and sends Hansel & Gretel back into the book. She then has to straighten things out with Larry and Louise. Richard X. Slattery as Policeman. Note: Filmed September 2, 1971.
239	11	"The Warlock in the Gray Flannel Suit"	Richard Michaels	John L. Greene	December 1, 1971
Samantha's cousin Panda is getting married in Hong Kong. Endora thinks it would be a disgrace if Sam didn't go. Darrin wouldn't mind if they went, but he has so much work piled up, they couldn't possibly go. Endora enlists the help of a hippie warlock named Alonzo (Bernie Kopell) to do away with Darrin's job so that he is free to attend a wedding with Sam. At the office, Larry and Darrin are discussing getting Mr. Cushman's (Charles Lane) Monticello Carpets account. Alonzo shows up claiming to be a great copywriter. Alonzo puts a spell on Larry to love all of his "far out" campaign ideas. It doesn't take long for Darrin to figure out that Alonzo was sent by Endora and he calls Sam. Sam meets up with Darrin and tells him she couldn't get a hold of Endora. Darrin feels like quitting his job and Sam says that's exactly what Endora wants. Darrin agrees to let Sam use some witchcraft to open up his own ad agency across the hall from McMann and Tate. Larry sees Darrin's new business just as Mr. Cushman arrives. Larry introduces Mr. Cushman to Alonzo. Mr. Cushman is not impressed with Alonzo's idea's. Sam covertly gets Alonzo to remove the spell on Larry and Alonzo then leaves. Mr. Cushman goes to see Darrin and he signs on with Darrin's ad campaign. Larry, in his usual style, works things out with Darrin. Notes: Filmed August 19, 1971.; Partial remake of the season 1 episode "Your Witch Is Showing".
240	12	"The Eight-Year Itch Witch"	Richard Michaels	Ruth Brooks Flippen	December 8, 1971
Endora is upset because Darrin has a bunch of pictures of bikini clad women in his briefcase. Samantha isn't concerned because models are used in advertising all the time. Sam asks Endora to babysit that evening as it is the eight year anniversary of their first date. Endora transforms a Siamese cat into a statuesque model named Ophelia (Julie Newmar). Endora does this in an effort to test Darrin's loyalty to Sam. Meanwhile, Larry tells Mr. Burkeholder (Parley Baer) they need to find this year's Catlady as the mascot for Tom Cat Tractor. Ophelia shows up to the office and Burkeholder is immediately taken with her. Darrin takes Ophelia to a photo shoot. Burkeholder and Larry insist Darrin goes with Ophelia on a business trip to Albany for Tom Cat. This is despite he was supposed to celebrate his and Sam's anniversary of their first date. Ophelia does whatever she can to seduce Darrin on the trip. Endora still insists that Darrin can't be trusted. Sam and Endora zap to Darrin's hotel to check on things. Sam figures out what Endora did and makes a bet with Ophelia. As long as Ophelia doesn't use any magic on Darrin, she can seduce him all she wants. Sam is doing this to show how much faith she has in Darrin and the strength of their marriage. Darrin justifies Sam's faith in him. Notes: Filmed August 26, 1971.; Remake of the season 1 episode "It Takes One To Know One", combined with elements of the same season's "Ling Ling".
241	13	"Three Men and a Witch on a Horse"	Richard Michaels	Ed Jurist	December 15, 1971
Samantha learns that a tip on the daily double horse race that Abner Kravitz gave Darrin paid off. Darrin didn't place the bet. Endora pops in and is upset that Darrin didn't take a chance and win a lot of money for Sam. Endora puts a spell on Darrin that gives him the gambling bug. She also casts a spell on Tabitha's hobby horse that makes it predict the results of horse races. Darrin shows up late to a lunch meeting with Larry and Mr. Spengler (John Fiedler), one of their spendthrift clients. Darrin tells them that he stopped to place a bet on the daily double horse race. Darrin says the horses both came in first and he won $890. Spengler says he's not usually a betting man, but this time he's interested. Sam finds out what her mother has done and tries to get her to remove the spell. Instead, Endora makes sure Darrin's horse will lose the race. Darrin convinces Larry and Spengler to go in on the next bet. Sam then learns what Endora did. She's worried about Larry and Spengler losing their money. Sam convinces Count of Valor, the horse, to try and win. The race has started and Count of Valor is in last place. Larry and Spengler are panicking. Darrin tells them he'll cover their bets. The horse winds up winning. Endora takes the spell off Darrin. Larry convinces Darrin to give Spengler and him their money. Scatman Crothers as Horse Handler. Note: Filmed September 16, 1971.
242	14	"Adam, Warlock or Washout?"	William Asher	Ed Jurist	December 29, 1971
Endora informs Samantha that she can't keep putting off the Witches Test Committee's visit. When Tabitha was Adam's age, she was already performing magic. Sam needs to get Darrin out of the house. Endora warns that the Committee threatens to dissolve Sam's marriage if Adam has no powers. Endora also says that Maurice will be coming by as well. Darrin decides to go play golf. Maurice arrives and goes to see Adam. Sam's aunts, Grimalda (Maryesther Denver) and Enchantra (Diana Chesney) then come to test Adam. Maurice transfers some of his extra special powers to Adam in preparation for the test. At first Adam says he can't make a ball come to him. But then he levitates around the room. Maurice thinks that proves Adam has powers and he leaves. Adam says he wishes daddy were here and suddenly Darrin is in the room. Sam explains to Darrin what is going on. Because the Committee believes that Adam is a great prodigy, they want to remove him from the house for special training. Sam gets Maurice to return. He explains that he helped Adam with the magic. The Committee says that the marriage must now be dissolved. Sam gives Adam a little motherly guidance and he is able to perform magic when it really counts. Notes: Filmed August 5, 1971.; The last episode broadcast by ABC in primetime when rerun on July 1, 1972.; Remake of the season 3 episode "Witches and Warlocks Are My Favorite Things".; The last episode to feature Maurice.
243	15	"Samantha's Magic Sitter"	Richard Michaels	Henry Sharp & Phil Sharp	January 5, 1972
Samantha and Darrin a going to a business dinner. Due to her faulty magic, Esmeralda unexpectedly shows up. When she learns Sam and Darrin are going out, Esmeralda offers to babysit. When Sam says she already got Aunt Hagatha to babysit, Esmeralda feels useless. Larry comes by and says that the dinner is off as client Elliott Norton (Richard X. Slattery), and his wife Martha, couldn't get a babysitter. Esmeralda offers to babysit. While watching little Ralph, Esmeralda performs magic and tells the boy she is a witch. She unknowingly changes a stuffed lion toy into a real lion cub. The Norton's come home with Sam and Darrin. Sam sees the lion and zaps it outside where she then changes it back to a toy. Later, Martha and Ralph come by to see Sam. Ralph has a black eye. He got into a fight at school when he told his classmates he had a witch for a babysitter. Martha is furious with Sam and Esmeralda. Sam uses a little magic to get Martha to agree to bring Ralph to a party for Tabitha. At the party, Sam counts on Esmeralda's faulty magic act to show Martha where Ralph got the idea she is a witch. Christian Juttner as Robert. Notes: Filmed September 23, 1971.; Partial remake of the season 1 episode "There's No Witch Like an Old Witch".
244	16	"Samantha Is Earthbound"	Richard Michaels	Michael Morris	January 15, 1972
Darrin is impressed that Samantha volunteered to help at Mrs. Selma Prescott's (Sara Seegar) charity event and fashion show. Darrin thinks it's very important to get close to potential client Mr. Wilbur Prescott's (Jack Collins) wife. Sam is feeling very lethargic. She calls for Dr. Bombay. Sam has developed a condition, gravititis inflamitis, that makes her weigh over 500 pounds. Bombay gives her an antidote which makes her lighter than air. Selma comes by to pick up Sam. Darrin goes with Sam to be her anchor. At the event, Darrin tries to contact Dr. Bombay. Sam is manning a booth, but then floats up into a tree. Darrin climbs up to get her. Selma sees them and reminds Sam that she is to be in the fashion show very soon. Wilbur sees Darrin in the tree and now has second thoughts about giving Darrin his account. It's time for the fashion show. Sam's lighter than air behavior helps save the Prescott Shoe account. Things get a little confusing when Wilbur shows up just when Bombay is giving Sam another antidote. Molly Dodd as Mrs. Brock. Notes: Filmed October 14, 1971.; Beginning with this episode, Bewitched was moved from Wednesdays to Saturdays, opposite CBS's All in the Family.
245	17	"Serena's Richcraft"	William Asher	Michael Morris	January 22, 1972
Samantha gets a call from Larry who says that he and potential client Harrison Woolcott (Peter Lawford) will be coming by to pick up Darrin. Woolcott is the wealthy owner of a chain of hotels. Serena comes by the front door. Serena's powers were taken away by the jealous Contessa Pirhana (Ellen Weston). Woolcott picks up Darrin in his helicopter and Serena learns Woolcott is quite wealthy. Later, Darrin, Larry and Woolcott come back to the house. Serena starts to flirt with him. The grounded Serena amuses herself by dating Harrison and they spend some time on his yacht. They become quite smitten with each other. Darrin is not happy about Serena taking up all of Woolcott's time. Sam comes up with a plan. She will impersonate Serena. Sam meets Harrison for lunch and tries to put him off. Later, Sam hopes to get Pirhana to restore Serena's powers. Just then, Darrin, Larry and Harrison come to the house. Sam puts a spell on Harrison to have him fall for Pirhana. Pirhana gives Serena her powers back and then leaves with Harrison. Darrin does get Harrison's account. Notes: Filmed during season 7 on January 15, 1971, but shelved until season 8.; Partial remake of the season 6 episode "A Chance on Love".; Peter Lawford sings one line of "Fly Me to the Moon".
246	18	"Samantha on Thin Ice"	William Asher	Richard Baer	January 29, 1972
Darrin comes home to find Endora there. Tabitha arrives and tells them that she's been invited to an ice skating party. Samantha reminds her that she doesn't know how to skate. Darrin tells Endora that Tabitha will learn the mortal way. Darrin wants Sam to take lessons with Tabitha and not use any witchcraft. At their first lesson, Sam and Tabitha are not doing so well. Their instructor (Robert Paul) is also flirting with Sam. While the instructor and Sam are skating, Endora pops in to talk to Tabitha. Tabitha tells Endora that she'll be the worst skater at the party. To get the instructor to stop his flirting, Sam uses a little magic to skate well. Endora then casts a spell on Tabitha, making her an ice skating sensation. Later, Billy "Blades" Bucholtzer (Alan Oppenheimer) arrives at the house. He is a former competitive skater and is now a coach. The instructor told him about Tabitha. Blades believes that Tabitha could be the next Olympic champion and wants her to audition for him. Sam tries to turn him down, but Billy won't take no for an answer. Darrin now knows that Endora was involved. The next morning Sam tells Darrin that Endora took the spell off Tabitha. They take Tabitha to the audition to show Blades that she can't really skate. Endora shows up and puts the spell back on Tabitha. Sam convinces Endora to take the spell off just before Billy arrives. Notes: Filmed September 30, 1971.; Remake of the season 5 episode "Samantha on the Keyboard".
247	19	"Serena's Youth Pill"	E. W. Swackhamer	Michael Morris	February 5, 1972
Samantha gets Serena to babysit Tabitha and Adam. Larry unexpectedly comes by. To have some fun, Serena starts to flirt with him. Serena gives Larry a Vitamin V pill and tells him it will make him feel younger. She continues to flirt with Larry and he figures he better leave. When he gets home his gray hair is now red. Serena tells Sam and Darrin that Larry came by and she leaves. Larry comes by and tells Sam and Darrin about the pill. Larry wants to market the pill to make millions. They try to talk him out of it and Larry leaves. Darrin thinks Larry actually looks younger. Sam says that Serena's Vitamin V pill may have been a youth pill and Larry will continue to get younger. At the office, Darrin notices that as Larry gets younger he only remembers things from the age he is. Darrin gets Sam to come by the office and now Larry is a young man. By the time they bring Larry to their house, he's a little boy. Louise is there and they tell her that the boy is from the neighborhood. Serena has a potion that returns Larry to his correct age. Larry says that he imagined some very strange things and he changes his mind about marketing the pill. Notes: Filmed October 7, 1971.; Last episode to feature Serena and Louise Tate.
248	20	"Tabitha's First Day in School"	Richard Michaels	Ed Jurist	February 12, 1972
Maude Hickman, from the Board of Education, tells Darrin and Samantha that Tabitha is of age and should be enrolled in school. Sam says she's been home schooling Tabitha. Maude says that Sam is not qualified and it's against the law for her to teach Tabitha. Sam makes Tabitha promise to not use any witchcraft at all and brings her to Mrs. Peabody's (Maudie Prickett) class. Sam asks Mrs. Peabody if she could stay and watch Tabitha for a while. Mrs. Peabody says that it isn't a good idea. Tabitha is immediately bullied by a boy named Charlton Rollnick, Jr. (Michael Hughes). Charlton finds a way to get Tabitha in trouble. At the end of the school day, Charlton grabs Tabitha and she turns him into a bullfrog. Not knowing what happened, Mrs. Peabody tells Tabitha put the frog in the class terrarium. Tabitha actually brings the frog home. Tabitha tells Sam what happened. Tabitha can't seem to change Charlton back. So Charlton's mother doesn't worry, Sam calls Mrs. Rollnick (Nita Talbot) and says he's playing with Tabitha. Mrs. Rollnick says she'll pick him up. Sam figures out that Tabitha brought the wrong frog home. Sam zaps back to the school and exchanges frogs. Sam gets back to the house just as Mrs. Rollnick shows up. Things get a little complicated when Tabitha tries to change Charlton back, but things work out in the end. Allen Jenkins as Janitor. Notes: Filmed November 11, 1971.; Remake of the season 5 episode "I Don't Want to be a Toad, I Want to be a Butterfly" (which also featured Maudie Prickett), with elements of the season 4 episode "Playmates".
249	21	"George Washington Zapped Here (Part 1)"	Richard Michaels	Michael Morris	February 19, 1972
While trying to help Tabitha with a school project, Esmeralda accidentally brings George Washington (Will Geer) into the 20th century. George thinks he's dreaming. Samantha discovers what Esmeralda has done and tells Darrin. Because of her faulty witchcraft, Esmeralda cannot remember the spell to get him back. Sam tries to explain to George how he got to where he is. While Sam is getting George some tea, he wanders out of the house. Sam goes looking for George. A Neighbor (Dick Wilson) tells Sam that he saw George and told him to visit the park. George is speaking to a large crowd in the park. A policeman comes by and tells George he can't do any public speaking without a permit. George pulls out his sword and points it at the officer. Sam comes by and tries to say that George is with her. But the officer arrests George anyway. A Police Sergeant (Herb Vigran) tells Sam that George's bail will be $2000 and the trial will be in 4 weeks. Back at home, Darrin says he was able to move the trial up to the next day. Darrin also says he was able to change the trial to a hearing in the Judge's chamber. Esmeralda remembers the spell and sends George back. But she later makes another mistake and George returns with his wife Martha (Jane Connell). Notes: Filmed December 3, 1971.; This episode and "George Washington Zapped Here (Part 2)" are remakes of the two-part season 3 episodes "My Friend Ben" and "Samantha for the Defense".
250	22	"George Washington Zapped Here (Part 2)"	Richard Michaels	Michael Morris	February 26, 1972
Samantha and Darrin learn that Esmeralda mistakenly brought back George and Martha Washington. After Darrin raises his voice to Esmeralda, she gets flustered and zaps away. George tells Darrin that he's glad he was brought back. He wants his chance to defend himself at the hearing in front of Judge Armstrong (Herb Voland). The next morning Larry makes a surprise visit. He sees George and Martha, who Sam introduces as relatives from out of town. Larry wants to use the President in ads for Mr. Jamieson's (Jack Collins) Whirlwind Washing Machines. Despite Darrin's objection, George is interested in Larry's offer. Larry and Darrin bring George to the office to meet Mr. Jamieson. George mentions that there was a Jamieson in his regiment. Jamieson says that was his grandfather's grandfather. Things get awkward when George says the man was a coward and was court martial-ed. After some more statements by George, they lose the account. Later, Sam and Darrin take George to see Judge Armstrong. Thanks to Sam, everyone there gets a civics lesson on what Washington envisioned for America. The Judge drops the charges. Esmeralda manages to send George and Martha back. Notes: Filmed December 8, 1971.; The last episode to feature Esmeralda.
251	23	"School Days, School Daze"	Richard Michaels	Michael Morris	March 4, 1972
Samantha tells Darrin that today is the day that Tabitha is to take a test to see if she's smart enough to skip to the second grade. Endora pops in and is upset that Tabitha is not being sent to a witches finishing school. Because Tabitha is worried about the test, Endora gives her all the knowledge she will need. Mrs. Peabody, her teacher, tells Tabitha the test should take 20 minutes. Tabitha is done in 30 seconds and answers all the questions correctly. Mrs. Peabody now believes Tabitha is not only smart enough to skip to the second, but that she is a genius. Mrs. Peabody even proves to Mr. Roland (Charles Lane), the principal, how smart Tabitha is. Sam, suspecting Endora had something to do with this, tries to down play Tabitha's intelligence. Back at home, Sam gets Endora to take the spell off Tabitha. Mrs. Peabody comes by and tells Sam she wants to write an article about Tabitha. Sam says no and gets her to leave. Mrs. Peabody, however, goes to the backyard where Tabitha and Adam are playing. She witnesses Tabitha perform some magic. Sam confronts Mrs. Peabody, who tells Sam they must be from outer space. When Mrs. Peabody threatens to go to the authorities, Sam tells her she is a witch and performs some magic. Mrs. Peabody tells Mr. Roland what happened and he naturally doesn't believe her. To prove it, she brings Mr. Roland to Sam's house. Sam manages to convince them that she is just a magician. Mr. Roland makes Mrs. Peabody apologize. Notes: Filmed November 4, 1971; The last episode to feature Adam.
252	24	"A Good Turn Never Goes Unpunished"	Ernest Losso	Bernie Kahn	March 11, 1972
Darrin is spending a lot of time on Mr. Benson's (J. Edward McKinley) mattress account. Larry promised Darrin a large bonus if they get it. Darrin would like to take Samantha to Bermuda for a week. Sam makes a few suggestions for Darrin's various slogans and he likes them. But then Darrin gets upset because he thinks Sam used witchcraft to come up with the ideas, which Sam denies. At the office, Darrin shows Benson his original ideas and Benson is not impressed. Back at home, Darrin tells Sam he didn't present her ideas to Benson because he still believes she used witchcraft. Until Darrin apologizes, Sam turns herself invisible. Larry sees Darrin's slogans that Sam touched up and he loves them. Darrin doesn't want Benson to see those ideas and tells Larry so. Benson arrives and Larry shows him the slogans and he doesn't like them at all. Darrin is thrilled when he realizes that there was no witchcraft involved. At home, Endora tries to cheer Sam up. She takes Sam to Cloud 9 for cocktails. Darrin comes home and Sam can hear him apologize and ask her to forgive him. Sam zaps back to the house and Darrin promises to never doubt her again. Something Sam says inspires Darrin and he goes to see Benson. Darrin and Sam celebrate when Darrin wins the account. Notes: Filmed November 19, 1971.; Remake of the season 5 episode "Is It Magic or Imagination?", which itself was a remake of the season 1 epsiode "Help, Help, Don't Save Me".; The last episode to feature Tabitha.
253	25	"Samantha's Witchcraft Blows a Fuse"	Richard Michaels	Leo Townsend	March 18, 1972
Darrin and Samantha are at Mr. Fong's (Benson Fong) Chinese restaurant, a potential client. Fong offers them an exotic drink. The cocktail has several secret ingredients, but Fong will only tell them one, a rare Himalayan cinnamon stick. After consuming the drink, Sam has a severe dizzy spell and wants to go home. When they get home, Sam doesn't even recognize Aunt Hagatha (Reta Shaw), who was babysitting. After her dizziness subsides, red stripes appear on her face and her magic is off. Hagatha calls Dr. Bombay to cure Samantha. Bombay says the stripes will last a year if not treated within 8 hours. He figures out it was the Himalayan cinnamon stick that caused it. He prescribes a potion from the witches' Apothecary (Bernie Kopell) and Hagatha zaps Sam there. Meanwhile, Bombay comes back and tells Darrin that he forgot one key ingredient, the tail feather from a Dodo Bird. Sam comes back with the potion and Darrin tells her about the feather. Sam gets more stripes on her face. Hagatha is able to zap a Dodo bird (Janos Prohaska) out of one of Tabitha's books. The bird gets out of the house and Fred (Richard X. Slattery) and Charlie (Paul Smith), two policemen, see it on the roof. They start to call their Police Sergeant (Herb Vigran), but then change their minds. Darrin finally gets the tail feather. The potion still doesn't work and they get Bombay. He forgot another ingredient, a Himalayan cinnamon stick. Darrin breaks into Fong's restaurant and gets the stick. Sam drinks the potion just as Fred and Charlie come by the house. They see Sam's stripes and ask about the bird. The stripes disappear and policemen think they are seeing things and leave. Notes: Filmed on November 26, 1971.; The last episode to feature Dr. Bombay, the Apothecary, and Aunt Hagatha; Remake of the season 2 episode "Take Two Aspirin and Half a Pint of Porpoise Milk".
254	26	"The Truth, Nothing but the Truth, So Help Me Sam"	William Asher	Ed Jurist	March 25, 1972
Darrin tells Samantha that he has an early appointment. He also says that he's bringing home a present for her just because he loves her. Darrin reminds Sam that Larry and clients Cora Mae (Sara Seegar) and Walter Franklin (Parley Baer) are coming for dinner. At the office, Darrin shows secretary Betty (Emily Banks) the unicorn pin he bought for Sam. Unicorns are Sam's favorite animal. They don't know that Endora is there. She casts a spell on the pin that causes every mortal that comes near it to tell the absolute truth. When that person steps away from the pin, they can lie again. Darrin and Betty have a awkward conversation because of the pin. Darrin comes home and gives Sam the pin. Endora pops in and says that Darrin must have a guilty conscience about something. That night, Larry and the Franklin's arrive. Cora Mae is the overbearing owner of Cora Mae Dresses. Walter is her henpecked husband. Whenever someone gets near Sam's pin, the truth comes out and it's not always pleasant. Sam can tell Endora did something. The evening turns into one huge argument. But somehow everything works out. Notes: Filmed December 16, 1971.; The last episode to be filmed and broadcast.; Remake of the season 2 episode "Speak the Truth".
