= Maramis =

Maramis is a Minahasan surname. Notable people with the surname include:

- Alexander Andries Maramis (1897–1977), Indonesian politician
- Maria Walanda Maramis (1872–1924), Indonesian women's rights activist
