= Embassy of the Philippines, Jakarta =

Diplomatic mission of the Philippines in Indonesia

Embassy of the Philippines, Jakarta Pasuguan ng Pilipinas sa Jakarta Kedutaan Besar Filipina di Jakarta
- Location: Jakarta
- Address: Jalan Imam Bonjol 8, Menteng, Central Jakarta
- Coordinates: 6°11′58.3″S 106°49′49.6″E
- Ambassador: Christopher B. Montero
- Website: https://jakartape.dfa.gov.ph/

The Embassy of the Philippines in Jakarta is the diplomatic mission of the Republic of the Philippines to the Republic of Indonesia. It is currently located at 8 Imam Bonjol Street (Indonesian: Jalan Imam Bonjol 8) in the Menteng district of Central Jakarta, near significant city landmarks like the Formulation of Proclamation Text Museum and Taman Suropati.

== History ==
The Philippine Embassy in Jakarta was initially opened as a consulate on November 24, 1949, a month before the establishment of diplomatic relations between the Philippines and the then-United States of Indonesia on December 27, 1949. Two months earlier, the Philippine government had dispatched Vicente Pastrana, who was previously posted as the first secretary to the Philippine Embassy in Washington D.C., to serve as the mission's consul, with Marciano Joven serving as vice-consul.

The consulate was upgraded to a legation on February 17, 1950, when President Elpidio Quirino appointed Manuel V. Gallego, who had served as his Secretary of Education, as the first minister to Indonesia. Despite the Indonesian government having already accredited an ambassador to the Philippines, the Philippine government initially continued to only accredit ministers to Indonesia, ostensibly due to financial difficulties. It was not until April 20, 1951 when Quirino appointed former Senator Domingo Imperial as the first ambassador to Indonesia, and the legation upgraded to a full embassy — the first Philippine embassy to be established in a Southeast Asian nation.

The embassy and its related facilities have been a target for terrorist attacks, the most serious of which was the bombing on the ambassadorial residence on August 1, 2000 which injured Ambassador Leonides Caday — the first time a Philippine diplomatic mission had been bombed. Security was tightened as a result of the bombing, believed to have been masterminded by leading Jemaah Islamiyah (JI) operative Fathur Rahman al-Ghozi. Two years later, the Embassy had been threatened with another possible bombing by followers of another JI member, Agus Dwikarna, who is believed to have masterminded the 2000 Rizal Day bombings along with al-Ghozi, and was convicted that year on explosives charges. Thousands of protesters then, on his orders, stormed the Embassy to demand his release. Security was also tightened again in 2003 owing to continuing possible threats.

== Building ==
Although the Philippine Embassy in Jakarta has been located in the same address since it first opened in 1949, the original chancery was demolished in 2010 to make way for the construction of a new, upgraded chancery building on the same site. Construction of the new chancery began with a groundbreaking on March 20, 2014, and the new building was inaugurated on September 12, 2015.

The current chancery, a two-story structure designed by architect Azhari Rasuman, combines the design of the traditional Filipino bahay na bato and nipa hut, while also maintaining the façade in New Indies Style, as mandated for buildings being built in the area. Construction of the new chancery was contracted to Indonesian firm PT Dekotama Ciptakreasi.

== Staff and activities ==
The Philippine Embassy in Jakarta is headed by Ambassador Christopher B. Montero, who was appointed to the position by President Bongbong Marcos on November 16, 2024. Prior to his appointment as ambassador, Montero, a career diplomat, was previously deployed to the Philippine Embassy in Bandar Seri Begawan as ambassador to Brunei. Although his appointment was confirmed by the Commission on Appointments on February 4, 2025, he was subsequently reappointed as ambassador by Marcos four days later. Montero ultimately presented his credentials to Indonesian President Prabowo Subianto on June 8, 2026, over a year after his appointment as ambassador, with the delay being attributed to Prabowo's busy schedule.

Many of the embassy's activities center around building ties between the two countries, with a particular emphasis in recent years between the southern Philippines and eastern Indonesia. In 2016, it hosted an event alongside the Department of Trade and Industry showcasing Philippine companies in a bid to increase their profile in Indonesia, while also hosting a familiarization tour for Indonesian companies looking to invest in the Philippines three years later, and lobbying for increased transport links. The embassy has also played a key role in promoting cultural and educational ties between the two countries, particularly with Muslim students in the Philippines studying in Indonesia.

In 2015, the embassy was criticized for its role in mishandling the case of Mary Jane Veloso, the only Filipino on death row in Indonesia, with members of the House of Representatives' committee on overseas workers affairs demanding the recall of its consul general.

== See also ==
- Indonesia–Philippines relations
- List of diplomatic missions of the Philippines
- Filipinos in Indonesia
- Embassy of Indonesia, Manila
