= List of ambassadors of Indonesia to the Philippines =

Ambassador of the Republic of Indonesia to Republic of the Philippines
- Duta Besar Republik Indonesia untuk Republik Filipina; Sugo ng Republika ng Indonesia sa Republika ng Pilipinas
- Seal of the Ministry of Foreign Affairs of Indonesia
- Incumbent vacant since February 8, 2026
- Ministry of Foreign Affairs; Embassy of Indonesia, Manila
- Style: His/Her Excellency
- Reports to: Ministry of Foreign Affairs
- Seat: Makati City, Metro Manila Philippines
- Nominator: President of Indonesia
- Inaugural holder: Alexander Andries Maramis
- Formation: February 1, 1950
- Website: Indonesian Embassy, Manila

The Ambassador of Indonesia to the Philippines (Filipino: Sugo ng Indonesia sa Pilipinas; Indonesian: Duta Besar Indonesia untuk Filipina) is the Republic of Indonesia's foremost diplomatic representative in the Philippines. As head of Indonesia's diplomatic mission there, the ambassador is the official representative of the president and the government of Indonesia to the president and the government of the Philippines. The position has the rank and status of an ambassador extraordinary and plenipotentiary and is based at the embassy located in Makati, the financial center within the country's capital region.

The Indonesian ambassador to the Philippines serves as the non-resident ambassador to the countries of Marshall Islands and Palau.

== Heads of mission ==
Head of mission	Tenure	Note(s)
Alexander Andries Maramis	February 1, 1950 – April 10, 1953	He would later serve as ambassador to the countries of West Germany and the Soviet Union.
Mohamed Nazir Datoek Pamontjak	1956–1965	
Abdul Karim Rasjid	1965–1966	
Moersjid	1967–1969	Appointed in accordance with Presidential Decree No. 26 by Sukarno.
Kusno Utomo	1970–1973	
Sri Bimo Ariotedjo	1973–1977	
Soedarmono	1977–1981	
Leo Lopulisa	1981–1983	
Mudjono Purbonegoro	1984–1988	
Soewarso Hardjosoedarmo	1988–1992	
Pieter Damanik	1992–1995	
Abu Hartono	1995–1999	
Soeratmin	1999–2005	
Irzan Tanjung	November 11, 2005 – January 21, 2010	
Kristiarto Legowo	January 21, 2010 – February 14, 2014	
Johnny Lumintang	February 14, 2014 – February 20, 2018	Credentials were presented to Benigno Aquino III on April 8, 2014.
Sinyo Harry Sarundajang	February 20, 2018 – February 13, 2021	Credentials were presented to Rodrigo Duterte on May 28, 2018.
Agus Widjojo	January 12, 2022 – February 8, 2026	Credentials were presented to Rodrigo Duterte on May 25, 2022. Died in office.
