= The Steel Claw =

The Steel Claw can refer to:

- The Steel Claw (film), a 1961 war film
- The Steel Claw (comics), a British comics character created in 1962
- "Steel Claw", a song written by Paul Brady and performed by Tina Turner from Turner's 1984 album Private Dancer
