= Sinyo Harry Sarundajang =

Indonesian diplomat (1945–2021)

Dr. Drs. Sinyo Harry Sarundajang
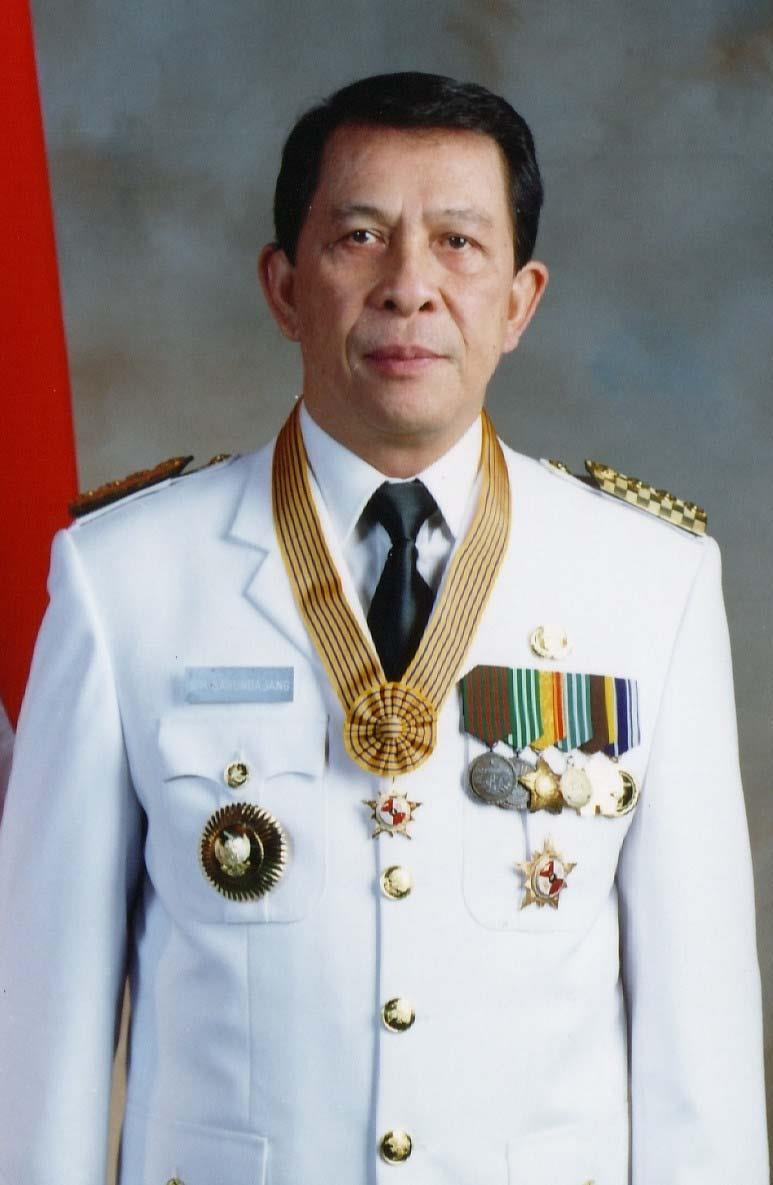

Ambassador of Indonesia to the Philippines, Marshall Islands, and Palau
- In office 20 February 2018 – 13 February 2021
- President: Joko Widodo
- Preceded by: Johny J. Lumintang
- Succeeded by: Agus Widjojo

11th Governor of North Sulawesi
- In office 14 September 2010 – 20 September 2015
- President: Susilo Bambang Yudhoyono; Joko Widodo
- Deputy: Djouhari Kansil
- Preceded by: Robby Mamuaja (Acting)
- Succeeded by: Soni Sumarsono (Acting)
- In office 13 August 2005 – 13 August 2010
- Deputy: Freddy Harry Sualang
- Preceded by: Lucky Harry Korah
- Succeeded by: Robby Mamuaja (Acting)

Governor of Maluku Acting
- In office 11 December 2002 – 15 September 2003
- President: Megawati Sukarnoputri
- Preceded by: M. Saleh Latuconsina
- Succeeded by: Karel Albert Ralahalu

Governor of North Maluku Acting
- In office 18 April 2002 – 29 October 2002
- President: Megawati Soekarnoputri
- Preceded by: Saleh Latuconsina
- Succeeded by: Thaib Armaiyn

Mayor of Manado Acting
- In office 1 August 2009 – 26 April 2010
- Preceded by: Abdi Buchari
- Succeeded by: Robby Mamuaja (Acting)

1st Mayor of Bitung
- In office 10 October 1990 – 10 April 2000
- Preceded by: Himself (as Administrative Mayor of Bitung)
- Succeeded by: Iskandar Lexie Gobel (Acting)

Personal details
- Born: 16 January 1945 Kawangkoan, Minahasa, North Sulawesi, Japanese East Indies
- Died: 13 February 2021 (aged 76) Jakarta, Indonesia
- Party: Partai Demokrat
- Spouse: Deetje Adelin Laoh Tambuwun
- Children: Steven J. Sarundajang; Vanda D. Sarundajang; Fabian R. Sarundajang; Eva C. Sarundajang; Shinta Sarundajang
- Education: Sam Ratulangi University; Gadjah Mada University
- Occupation: Politician

Sinyo Harry Sarundajang (16 January 1945 – 13 February 2021) was an Indonesian politician and diplomat. He served as governor of North Sulawesi for all but one month from 2005 to 2015. He was also a former Governor of North Maluku in 2002 and Maluku in 2002–2003. In February 2018, he was appointed by then-President Joko Widodo as the ambassador to the Philippines, with concurrent accreditation to the Marshall Islands and Palau.

== Personal life ==
=== Early life ===
Sarundajang was born in Kawangkoan, Minahasa Regency, North Sulawesi on 16 January 1945. He is the firstling of three brothers of Youtje Sarundajang and Yulian Liow. He married Deetje Adeline Laoh Tambuwun on 17 June 1969, and they have 2 sons and three daughters named Ivan, Fabian, Vanda, Eva, and Shinta. Ivan Sarundajang served as the vice regent of Minahasa Regency from 2013 to 2018, Vanda Sarundajang is a member of the People's Representative Council from the Indonesian Democratic Party of Struggle, Fabian Sarundajang is a member of the Regional Representative Council, and Eva Sarundajang is member of People's Representative Council of North Sulawesi.

=== Education ===
Sarundajang was educated in Sam Ratulangi University and earned the Baccalaureate of state administration in 1968, and he received the bachelor's degree at the 17 Agustus 1945 University, Jakarta in 1970. In 1972, he continued his studies at the Institut international d'administration publique, France, and earned the postgraduate degree in territorial administration. In 2011, he earned a doctorate from the Gadjah Mada University.

== Career ==
=== Mayor of Bitung ===
Sarundajang became the mayor of the administrative city of Bitung in 1986. Unlike cities in Indonesia, administrative city do not have any city council and is not an autonomous territory. Sarundajang attempted to propose Bitung into an autonomous city, and his proposal was accepted in 1990. Bitung officially became a city on 10 October 1990, and Sarundajang was inaugurated as mayor on the same day. Sarundajang became the definitive mayor after he was elected in 1991 (assumed office on 7 December 1991) and again in 1996 (assumed office on 7 December 1996). Sarundajang ended his term after he handed over his office to city secretary Lexie Gobel on 10 April 2000. Sarundajang, who served as mayor for over fourteen years, became the third longest-serving mayor in Indonesia after Suryatati Abdul Manan (17 years) and Soedarisman Poerwokoesoemo (19 years).

=== Acting Governor of North Moluccas ===
After ending his tenure in Bitung, Sarundajang was posted in Jakarta where he became the staff to the Minister of Internal Affairs. A year later, Sarundajang became the Inspector General of the Ministry of Internal Affairs, replacing Andi Jalal Bachtiar. Sarundajang's tenure as inspector general was short lived as Sarundajang was sent to North Moluccas to become acting governor. His main task as acting governor was to pacify the region, which had been ridden with widespread religious violence between Muslims and Christians. Initially, most North Moluccans were cynical of his appointment and some were demanding his resignation from office.

The night after he arrived in North Maluku, a bomb exploded in the entrance of his hotel, just 25 meters away from his bed. In a 2004 interview, Sarundajang remarked that he did not fear the bomb, but the bomb made him realize the difficulties of his task of reconciliation. The next day, Sarundajang began his trip around North Moluccas, where he visited the houses of local community and religious leaders. Sarundajang shocked the leaders by entering their houses through the back door instead of the usual front door. In what he called as a show of good deed, Sarundajang drank a glass of water before conversing with the leaders each time he visited a house.

Sarundajang's approach was lauded by the local Muslims and Christians. As a sign of respect, Muslims in the region gave him the title of khalifa. After successfully negotiating with both sides, Sarundajang brought together both parties into a discussion. Both parties agreed to a reconciliation and a gubernatorial election was held shortly after. Thaib Armaiyn, a Muslim, was elected as the definitive governor and Sarundajang handed over his office to him on 29 September 2002.

=== Acting Governor of Moluccas ===
Sarundajang's success in the reconciliation of North Moluccas had him appointed the acting Governor of Moluccas. Sarundajang assumed office on 11 December 2002 and was sent to the province several days after his inauguration in Jakarta. Similar to its northern counterpart, the Moluccas had experienced religious conflict between Christians and Muslims since 1999. The Moluccan populace was divided on Sarundajang's acting governorship, with Muslims in the region opposing him and Christians supporting him. Once again, Sarundajang was able to reconcile the province and successfully held gubernatorial election. Sarundajang was revered by Christians in the province as a "little angel". He handed over his office to Karel Albert Rahalalu, the elected Christian governor, under dramatically improved social and political conditions.

== Governor of North Sulawesi ==
=== First term ===
Sarundajang ran as a candidate for the 2005 North Sulawesi gubernatorial election. His campaign team consisted of retired bureaucrats and military officers, including former Governor of North Sulawesi C. J. Rantung. Rantung himself recommended Golkar as Sarundajang's party in the elections. However, Golkar did not offer any endorsement to Sarundajang and he chose to run with the endorsement of the Indonesian Democratic Party of Struggle (PDIP) instead. Sarundajang picked Freddy Harry Sualang, who at that time was PDIP's chairman in North Sulawesi, as his running mate.

Although he was endorsed by PDIP, the party were largely uninvolved in campaigns. Sarundajang received most support from Golkar officials who were disappointed with the leadership of A. J. Sondakh, the incumbent governor who was also the chairman of Golkar in the province. Sarundajang's campaign team focused on his career as a "peacemaker" in North Moluccas and the Moluccas, with one of his campaign brochure emphasizing his title as a khalifah and "little angel". The election saw Sarundajang winning with 448,325 votes, or 39% of the total votes. His victory was seen as an end to the Golkar party's dominance in the area, in which Sondakh, the party's official candidate. only won 17% of the votes. Sarundajang assumed office on 13 August 2005.

In 2009, a corruption case involving inflated sales fund for Manado Beach Hotel came to surface. The acting mayor of Manado, Abdi Buchari, and Sarundajang's deputy, Freddy Sualang, was convicted of being involved in the corruption. The Minister of Internal Affairs deactivated both from their office after the two were brought into the court. To prevent vacancy, Sarundajang assumed office as the acting mayor on 11 August. Sarundajang's double office as both governor and acting mayor of the province's capital drew criticism from the Anti-Corruption Community Group, which stated that the office of acting mayor could only be held by active civil servants in the city. Sarundajang then appointed his regional secretary Robby Mamuaya to replace him as mayor.

=== Second term ===
Sarundajang ran again for the governorship in the 2010 North Sulawesi gubernatorial elections, this time as a candidate from the Democratic Party. Sarundajang picked Djouhari Kansil as his running mate and he registered to the General Elections Commission on 27 May 2010 an hour before midnight. Sarundajang was declared eligible to run in the elections on 17 June.

During his campaign, Sarundajang promoted the notion of a "Golden Triangle" in North Sulawesi's governance system. Sarundajang stated that he would ensure the representation of the three main ethnic groups in North Sulawesi (Minahasa, Nusa Utara, Totabuan) in his administration. While Sarundajang himself was of Minahasa origin, Sarundajang's running mate, Djouhari Kansil, was of Nusa Utara origin. Sarundajang also openly promoted Rachmat Mokodongan, a Totabuan, to seat the regional secretary post.

The election was held on 3 August 2010, alongside three other mayoral election and a regent election in the province. Initial quick counts favoured Sarundajang and he was declared as the winner on 12 August. However, Sarundajang's opponent disputed the results of the elections to the Constitutional Court of Indonesia, forcing Sarundajang's inauguration to be pushed back. Sarundajang briefly transferred his office to his regional secretary after his first term expired on 13 August 2010. The constitutional court refused to investigate the disputes filed by Sarundajang's opponent and Sarundajang was inaugurated for his second term on 14 September.

== Ambassador of Indonesia to the Philippines, Marshall Islands, and Palau ==
Sarundajang was sworn in as the Ambassador of Indonesia to the Philippines, Marshall Islands, and Palau, along with 16 other ambassadors, on 20 February 2018. He presented his credentials to President Rodrigo Duterte on 28 May.

In September 2017, three Indonesians were taken hostage by Abu Sayyaf, a Jihadist militant and pirate group. According to Sarundajang, the Indonesian government were uninvolved in the negotiations to free the hostage. The three Indonesians were freed by the Philippine government on 15 September 2019, and were handed back to Sarundajang as the representative of government a day later. Sarundajang stated that the citizens were in good health but physically distressed.

== Death ==
Sarundajang died at 00.31 on 13 February 2021, at Siloam Hospital, Jakarta, twenty eight days after his 76th birthday. According to his daughter, Sarundajang had suffered complications several days before his death. He was planned to be buried at his hometown in Kawangkoan, Minahasa.

== Honours ==
- Star of Mahaputera, 3rd Class (Bintang Mahaputera Utama) (2009)
- Star of Merit, 1st Class (Bintang Jasa Utama) (2004)
- Lencana Melati
- Lencana Darma Bakti
- Satyalancana Wira Karya
- Satyalancana Karya Satya (20 years)

Foreign

- Philippines:
  - Grand Cross, gold distinction of the Order of Sikatuna - Posthumous (2021)
