= Indonesia–Philippines relations =

- Indonesia: Philippines

Diplomatic mission
- Embassy of Indonesia, Manila: Embassy of the Philippines, Jakarta

Envoy
- Deputy Chief of Mission Victorina Hesti Dewayani: Ambassador Christopher Baltazar Montero

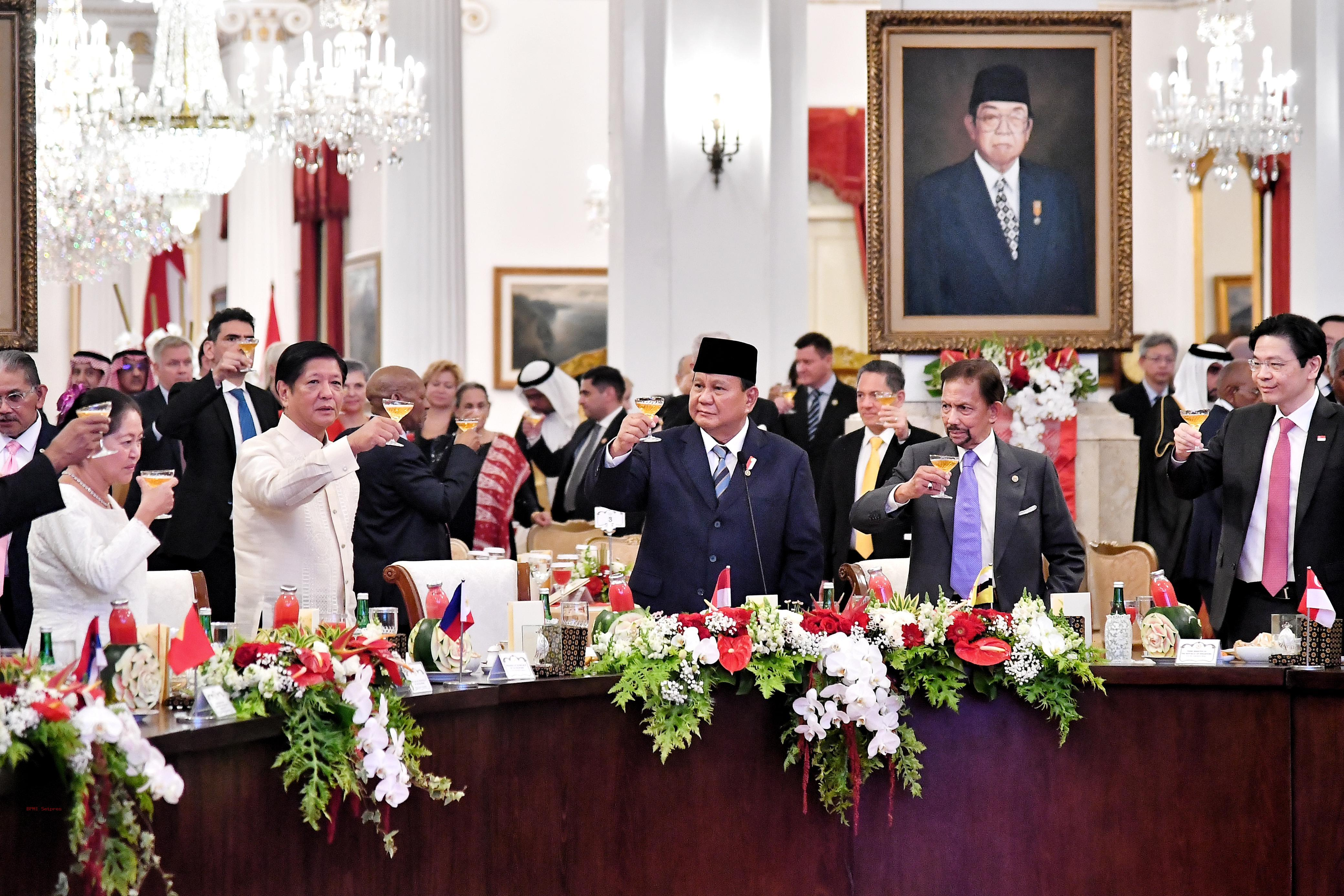
Philippine President Bongbong Marcos and First Lady Liza Araneta Marcos (left) at the inauguration dinner of Indonesian President Prabowo Subianto (center) on 20 October 2024.

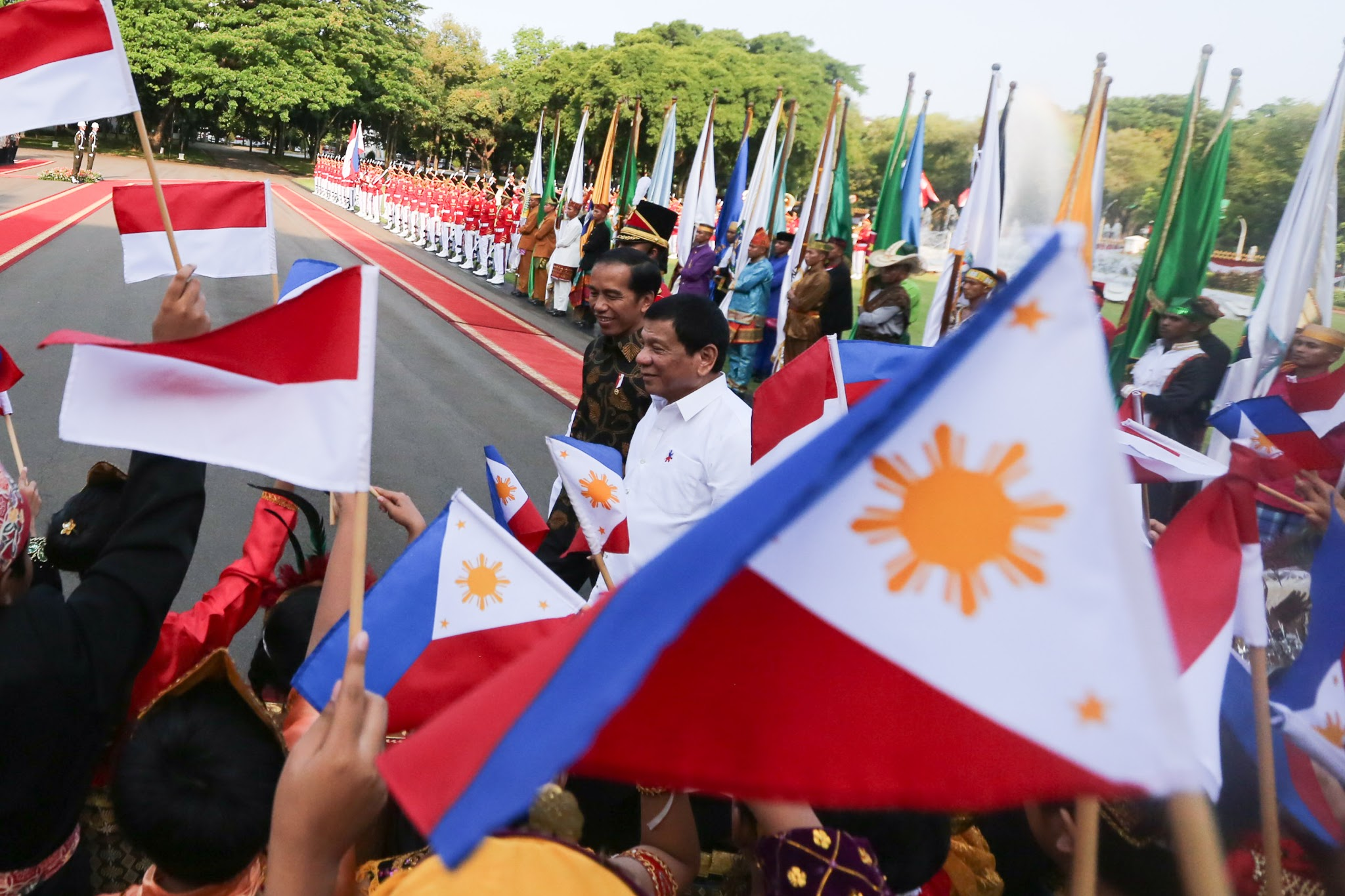
Philippine President Rodrigo Duterte is welcomed by Indonesian President Joko Widodo upon his arrival at Istana Merdeka in Jakarta on 9 September 2016.

Indonesia–Philippines relations (Indonesian: Hubungan Indonesia dan Filipina; Filipino: Ugnayang Indonesia at Pilipinas) are the bilateral relations between Indonesia and the Philippines. The two countries established diplomatic relations on 24 November 1949. Since then, both countries enjoy a cordial bilateral relationship in the spirit of kinship. The two countries are considered allies, and their relationship is often seen as one of the most important bilateral relationships in ASEAN. Both countries have established embassies in each other's capital city. Indonesia has an embassy in Manila and consulate in Davao City, while the Philippines has an embassy in Jakarta and a consulate in Manado. High-level state visits have been conducted between the two countries for years.

Both nations are founding members of ASEAN, and they are also members of the Non-Aligned Movement and APEC. Both countries are members of the East ASEAN Growth Triangle together with Brunei Darussalam and Malaysia in the BIMP-EAGA. Both countries are mostly composed of islands, and they also both reject territorial claims of the People's Republic of China in the region.

The Philippines and Indonesia also share several non-traditional security concerns, including climate change, terrorism, and economic recovery from the COVID-19 pandemic amid the Russo-Ukrainian war and the ongoing tension in the Taiwan Strait.

== History ==
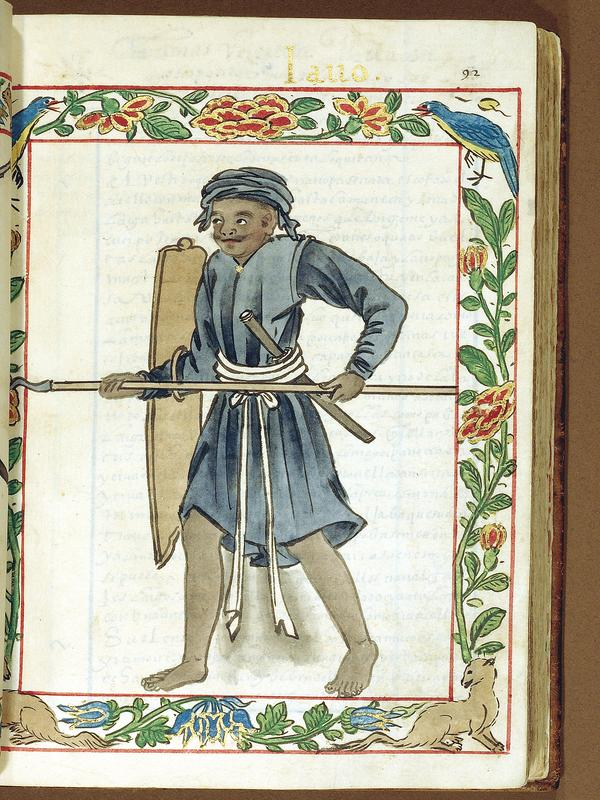
Warrior from Java in the Philippines, c. 1590 in Boxer Codex

=== Ancient era ===
Both the Philippines and Indonesia were part of the Maritime Jade Road. Indonesia and the Philippines are both archipelagic countries with ethnic populations and national languages that have common Austronesian ancestry. The historical links between ancient Indonesia and the Philippines have commenced since around the 9th century. The Laguna Copperplate Inscription dated from 900 CE mentioned the Javanese Medang Kingdom and the Srivijaya Empire. The writing system used is the Kawi Script, while the language is a variety of Old Malay, and contains numerous loanwords from Sanskrit and a few non-Malay vocabulary elements whose origin is between Old Tagalog and Old Javanese. The 14th century Nagarakretagama manuscript written during the height of Majapahit empire, mentioned several states that is now Philippines; Kalka, Selurong (Manila), and Solot (Sulu), suggested that Majapahit empire influences had reached the Philippine archipelago.

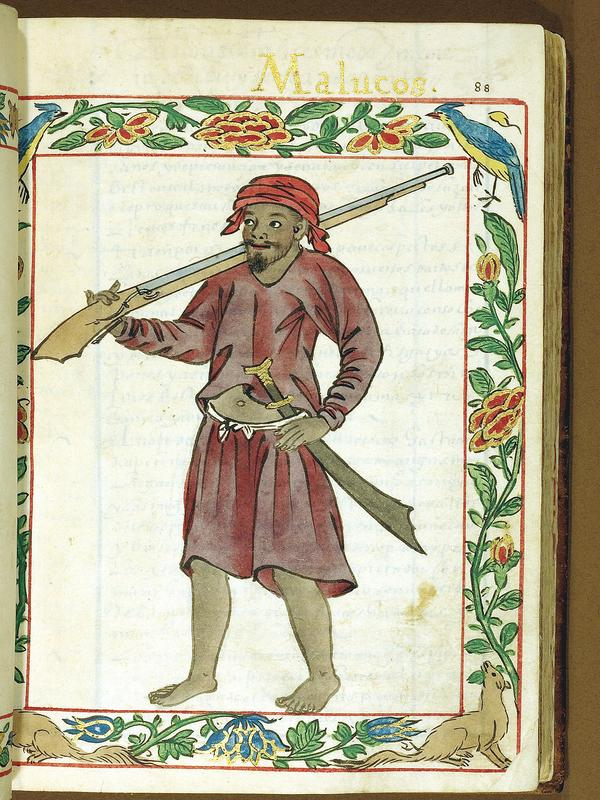
Moluccan Warrior in the Philippines, c. 1590 in Boxer Codex

Later on in the Medieval Period, a Filipino kingdom, the then Hindu Rajahnate of Sulu, which became the Muslim Sulu Sultanate, briefly conquered Kalimantan which are now territories of Indonesia. Later in the 1500s, the Indonesian kingdom of the Sultanate of Aceh, employed Filipinos from Luzon (Luções) as favored soldiers, ultimately, Fernão Mendes Pinto wrote in Peregrinação (C. R. Boxer, ed., The Travels of Mendes Pinto, vol. 1, Hakluyt Society, 1956) pp. 256–261 (Book II, ch. XLIX) Aceh (1539), these words, of the Luções:

Sapetu Diraja, a chieftain from Luçon, brought with him two hundred Luções veterans to serve the Sultan of Acheh. Their valor and skill with the kris so impressed the court that they were retained as the Sultan’s guard.

To be assigned as the Sultan's royal guard, is proof of Luçoes men's physical strength, martial prowess, and masculine attractiveness; as during that time period, among Medieval kingdoms, that office was only reserved to the most strong, intelligent, handsome, attractive, virile, aristocratic, and combat-worthy, of warriors.

=== European occupation ===
In the 16th century the two realms were divided under European colonial powers; Philippines archipelago was held under Spanish Empire while on the south the Moluccas spice islands (now Eastern parts of Indonesia) was under Portuguese possession, later wrestled by Dutch Empire. European colonials identify both archipelagic realms as East Indies, Spanish East Indies and Dutch East Indies.

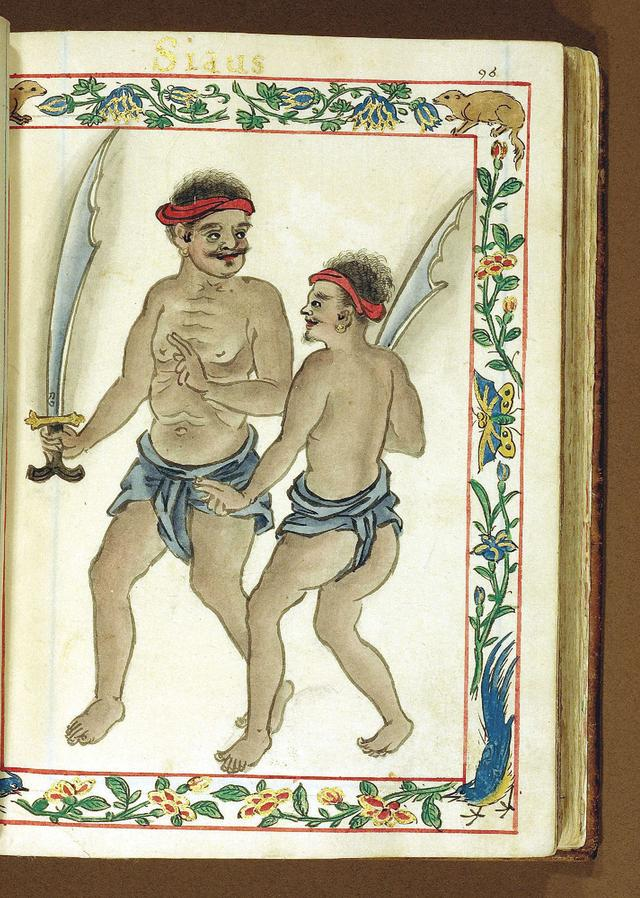
Warriors from Siau Island, North Sulawesi in the Philippines, c. 1590 Boxer Codex

From 1925 to 1926, Indonesian national hero and former PKI member Tan Malaka lived in Manila. There he became a correspondent of the nationalist newspaper El Debate, edited by Francisco Varona. Publication of Malaka's works, such as a second edition of Naar de Republiek Indonesia (December 1925) and Semangat Moeda (Young Spirit; 1926) might have been supported by Varona. He wrote his admiration for José Rizal struggle. There Malaka also met Mariano de los Santos, José Abad Santos, and Crisanto Evangelista.

=== Modern-day ===
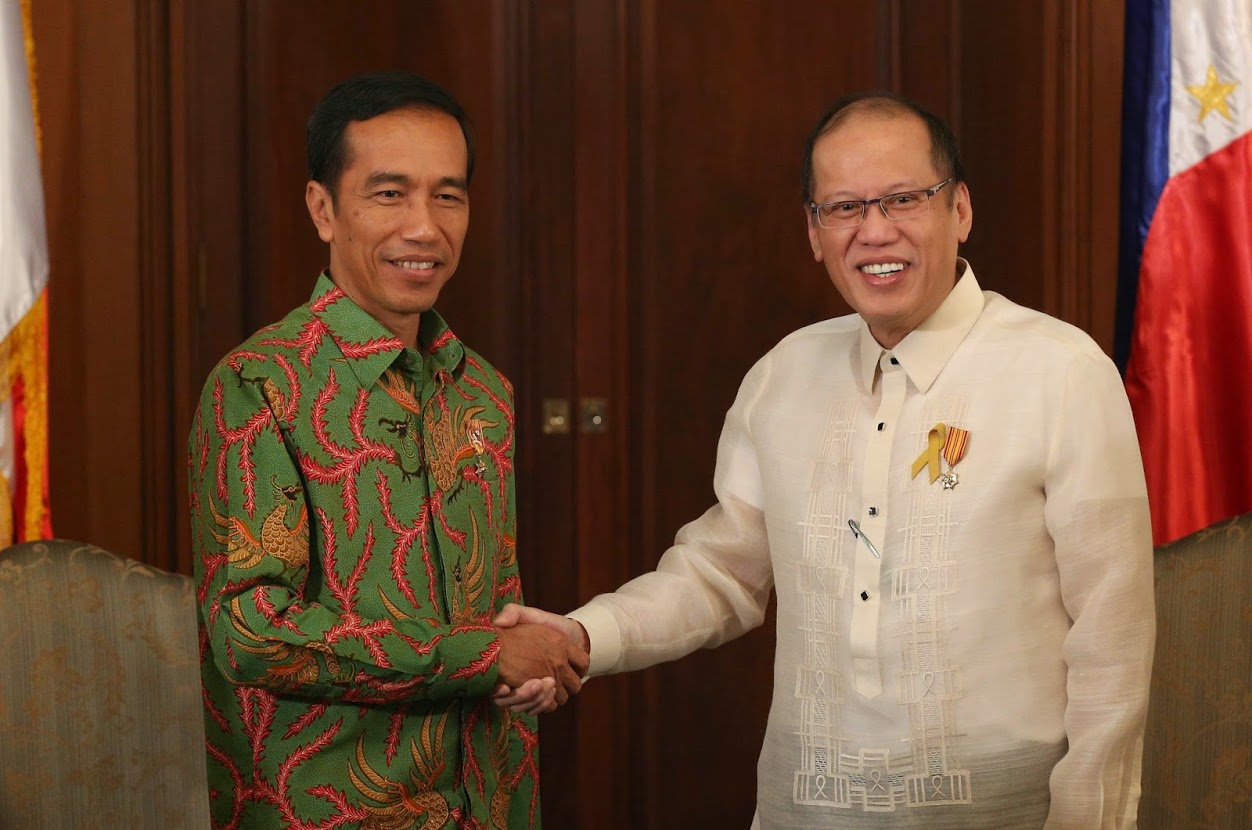
Presidents Joko Widodo and Benigno Aquino III shaking hands during the courtesy call at the Malacañang Palace, 2015

Since Indonesia's proclamation of independence on 17 August 1945, and the Philippines independence on 4 July 1946, the old cordial relationship between Indonesians and the Filipinos was reestablished. On 24 November 1949, the two countries established diplomatic relations. Since 1949, the Indonesian Government has opened its representative office (Consular Office) in Manila but it was not until the early 1950s that a diplomatic office (embassy) was established headed by an Ambassador. In 1967, both countries together with Thailand, Singapore and Malaysia founded ASEAN to ensure the peace and stability in the region.

In 2012, Indonesian television producers spawned their national franchise of the Philippine game-television show Eat Bulaga!, known as Eat Bulaga! Indonesia. The first Indonesian version adopted many activities and game segments from their original Philippine counterpart, before switching TV stations and adding their own twists.

However, with the case of Mary Jane Veloso, a Filipina death-row inmate in Indonesia convicted of drug trafficking, relations between the two nations may take a minor strain. Veloso has, however, requested her family and the Philippine government not to damage the Indonesia–Philippines relations. Veloso's execution was further delayed on the day she was scheduled to be executed in 2015. But following an agreement between the Indonesian and Philippine governments, Veloso returned to the Philippines in 2024.

In 2016, in an effort to improve the country's maritime capabilities, the Philippine Navy purchased its newest warship, the BRP Tarlac, from Indonesia. It is based on the Makassar-class ships used by the Indonesian Navy. The ship was built by PT PAL Indonesia, in Surabaya, East Java where it is to be exported from. This would enable the Philippines to rely less on foreign allies for military maritime transport.

In June 2016, economic relations between Indonesia and the Philippines took a minor strain, when the Indonesian officials suspended coal exports to the Philippines. This decision was made after 7 Indonesian sailors carrying boats of coal en route to the Philippines were kidnapped by Filipino militants in the Sulu Sea. It is unknown of whether the militants were part of the Abu Sayyaf. Indonesian minister for foreign affairs Retno Marsudi stated that the moratorium would last until the Philippine government could provide confident security to Indonesian nationals. Indonesia currently is the Philippines' biggest supplier of coal, approximately 70%.

In January 2017, the Philippines granted residence permits to persons of Indonesian descent (PIDs) and stateless people with Indonesian ancestry living in southern Philippines.

== Culture ==
=== Linguistic diversity ===
Both countries have considerable number of languages spoken, for example Indonesia has about 700 languages, while the Philippines has over 180 languages spoken in the country.

=== Ethnic groups ===
Both countries have a large number of ethnic groups, the Philippines has about 182 ethnic groups, (Note: The most common amongst the Filipino ethnic groups are the Tagalog people, Cebuano people, Bikol people and Mangyan.) while Indonesia has about 1,300, (Note: The most common amongst the Indonesian ethnic groups are the Javanese people, Batak people, Sundanese people and Minangkabau.) most of whom speak Austronesian languages.

== Similarities ==
=== Land ===
Both countries are archipelagos; Indonesia has 17,000 islands, about 6,000 of which are inhabited, with most living in Sumatra, Java, Kalimantan, Sulawesi, and the Indonesian part of New Guinea. The Philippines has 7,641 islands, the largest being Luzon, Mindanao, Samar, and Negros.

=== Season ===
Both countries are tropical archipelagos where there are only two seasons, the rainy season and the dry season.

=== Colonization and invasions ===
Both countries were colonized by European powers.

- Spanish East Indies – Spanish colony from 1565 to 1898
- Dutch East Indies – Dutch colony from 1602 to 1949 (included Netherlands New Guinea until 1962)

Both countries were invaded by Japan in 1941–1942 and occupied until 1945.

- Philippines campaign
- Dutch East Indies campaign

=== Language ===
The languages Filipino and Indonesian are members of Malayo-Polynesian languages and have some similarities in words.

Nouns
Indonesian	Filipino	English
aku	ako	me
kami	kami	we/us

Numbers
Indonesian	Filipino	English
Empat	Apat	Four
Lima	Lima	Five
Enam	Anim	Six

=== Dictatorships and revolutions ===
Both countries were ruled by Dictators following decolonization, which ruled for decades until they were overthrown in popular revolutions which paved the way for democracy.

==== Philippines ====
- Dictatorial Government (1898) – rule by Emilio Aguinaldo that also announced the Philippine Declaration of Independence.
- New Society Regime (1972–1986) – rule by Ferdinand Marcos from the announcement of the Proclamation No. 1081 until his removal from power following the People Power Revolution.

==== Indonesia ====
- Guided Democracy Regime (1959–1966) – rule by Sukarno from the announcement of his 1959 Decree until his fall from power during the Transition to the New Order.
- New Order Regime (1966–1998) – rule by Suharto from his Rise to Power until his Resignation from office following violent protests.

Both the Marcos and Suharto regimes were known for their extreme corruption, with the Marcos family embezzling from US$5 billion to $13 billion, and the Suharto family embezzling from US$15 billion to $35 billion.

=== Women Leaders ===
Both countries have a history of female presidents.

- Corazon Aquino (1986–1992) – replaced Ferdinand Marcos after the People Power Revolution. She is the mother of former president Benigno Aquino III.
- Gloria Macapagal Arroyo (2001–2010) – replaced Joseph Estrada after his Ouster and Resignation. She is the daughter of former president Diosdado Macapagal.
- Megawati Sukarnoputri (2001–2004) – replaced Abdurrahman Wahid after his Impeachment. She is the daughter of former president Sukarno.

=== Other ===
Both countries are known to have high amounts of workers emigrating to territories such as Hong Kong, Singapore, Malaysia, Saudi Arabia, United Arab Emirates.

== Trade ==
According to the Indonesian Ministry of Trade, that figure has gone from $1.12 billion in 2003 to $2.9 billion in 2009 and $3.89 billion in 2010. Indonesia is currently the Philippines' biggest supplier of coal, exporting about 70% of the Philippines' coal imports. In June 2016, Indonesian coal exports to the Philippines was put under a moratorium due to the growing concern of piracy in the Sulu Sea. That being said, the total trade between the two countries is in excess of $5.2 billion in 2016 with the balance of trade significantly favoring Indonesia, whose exports to Philippines compose over 85% of said figure. The first Indonesian warship to be exported was also delivered to the Philippines in May 2016. During 2020, Indonesia had a large net trade with Philippines in the exports of Transportation ($1.94B), Mineral Products ($1.46B), and Foodstuffs ($803M). Philippines also had a large net trade with Indonesia during 2020 in the exports of Machines ($211M), Chemical Products ($77.6M), and Metals ($72.3M).

== Transportation ==
The two countries are also actively supporting the Master Plan of ASEAN Connectivity, which will enhance greater mobility within the region. The Philippines in particular is eager to develop the ASEAN Roll-On/Roll-Off (RORO) Network and Short Sea Shipping. In April 2017, the new shipping route connecting Davao in the Philippines with Bitung in Indonesia was inaugurated. This shipping route is within the BIMP-EAGA agreement and expected to boost Indonesia-Philippines trade relations.

In an effort to improve and modernise their railway service, the Philippine National Railways has bought diesel multiple unit train sets from PT INKA Indonesia, and deployed in December 2019.

== Cooperation against border terrorism and separatism ==
Indonesia and the Philippines are working hand-in-hand to explore ways of cooperation to combat terrorism and other forms of transnational crimes threatening their borders and more broadly within Southeast Asia.

The Indonesian-Philippines naval border areas in Sulawesi Sea near Sulu archipelago and Mindanao waters are known as the piracy hotspots as well as terrorist's corridor. The Islamist militant operating in Poso, Central Sulawesi, has established relations with their Islamist terrorist counterparts in Sulu and Mindanao areas in Southern Philippines. Arms supply for Poso Islamist guerillas are suspected has been supplied by arm dealer operating in the Philippines blackmarket. On 26 March 2016, 10 Indonesian sailors were held hostage by Islamist militant group Abu Sayyaf operating in Sulu archipelago in southern Philippines. The Indonesian vessels were freighting coal from South Borneo heading for Batangas port was hijacked near Sulu waters. The Philippines and Indonesian authority has been working together to crack down this hostage crisis. On 2 May 2016, 10 of Indonesian sailor hostages were released by their captors. In July 2024 The Indonesian and Philippine navies launched a joint patrol in their maritime border of Sulawesi and Mindanao waters to strengthen their capabilities against piracy and terrorism.

In September 2024, Indonesia and The Philippines started joint patrols as part of the third phase of the Philippine-Indonesia Coordinated Patrol mission. The joint patrol was launched officially at Felix Apolinario Naval Station in Davao, the Philippines.

== Boundary agreement ==
Indonesia and Philippines share maritime borders mainly on Sulawesi Sea. In the past both countries were involved in territorial disputes over Miangas island (Island of Palmas Case). It was fought between the Netherlands and the United States and won by Netherlands East Indies in 1932. Today there are no territorial disputes between Indonesia and Philippines.

On 23 May 2014, the Philippines and Indonesia signed a historic agreement that drew a maritime boundary between the two countries' overlapping exclusive economic zones. Philippine Foreign Affairs Secretary Albert del Rosario and his Indonesian counterpart, Foreign Minister Marty Natalegawa, inked the deal in Manila with Philippine President Benigno Aquino III and Indonesian President Susilo Bambang Yudhoyono as witnesses. The EEZ is an area 200 nautical miles from a coastal state's baselines, or edges, within which the state has the sovereign rights to explore and exploit, and conserve and manage natural resources, among others. “The conclusion of the negotiations attests to the friendship, patience, goodwill, and commitment of the governments of the Philippines and Indonesia to peacefully address maritime issues,” said Foreign Affairs Undersecretary Evan Garcia, who led the Philippine team in negotiations.

== Disaster relief ==
Both Indonesia and Philippines archipelago are prone to natural disasters, such as volcanic eruptions, earthquakes, tsunamis and storms (typhoons, tornadoes, etc.). Both countries often help each other in times of need. The Indonesian government on Monday 10 December 2012, came to the aid of thousands of typhoon “Pablo” (Bopha) victims in the Visayas and Mindanao, donating $1 million and four tons of relief items through the Armed Forces of the Philippines. Besides the financial aid, the Indonesian government also gave 1,000 military blankets, 3,000 packs of ready-to-eat meals and 50 boxes of instant noodles.

In November 2013, Indonesian Government sent humanitarian aid of goods and logistics worth $1 million to help the victims of Typhoon Haiyan in Central Philippines as part of ASEAN solidarity. Indonesian Red Cross also sent 688,862 tonnes emergency supplies. Three Indonesian Air Force Hercules aircraft deployed with supplies to affected areas. Logistical aid including aircraft, food, generators and medicine. The Indonesian Red Cross deployed KM Emir cargo ship loaded with emergency supplies and also 30 Indonesian Red Cross volunteers.

== See also ==
- Foreign relations of Indonesia
- Foreign relations of the Philippines
- Indonesia–Philippines border
- Brunei, Indonesia, Malaysia, Philippines East ASEAN Growth Area
- Filipinos in Indonesia
  - Overseas Filipino Worker (OFW)
- Indonesians in the Philippines
  - Indonesian Migrant Worker (PMI)
- Maphilindo
- List of ambassadors of Indonesia to the Philippines
