= Filipinos in Indonesia =

Ethnic population in Indonesia

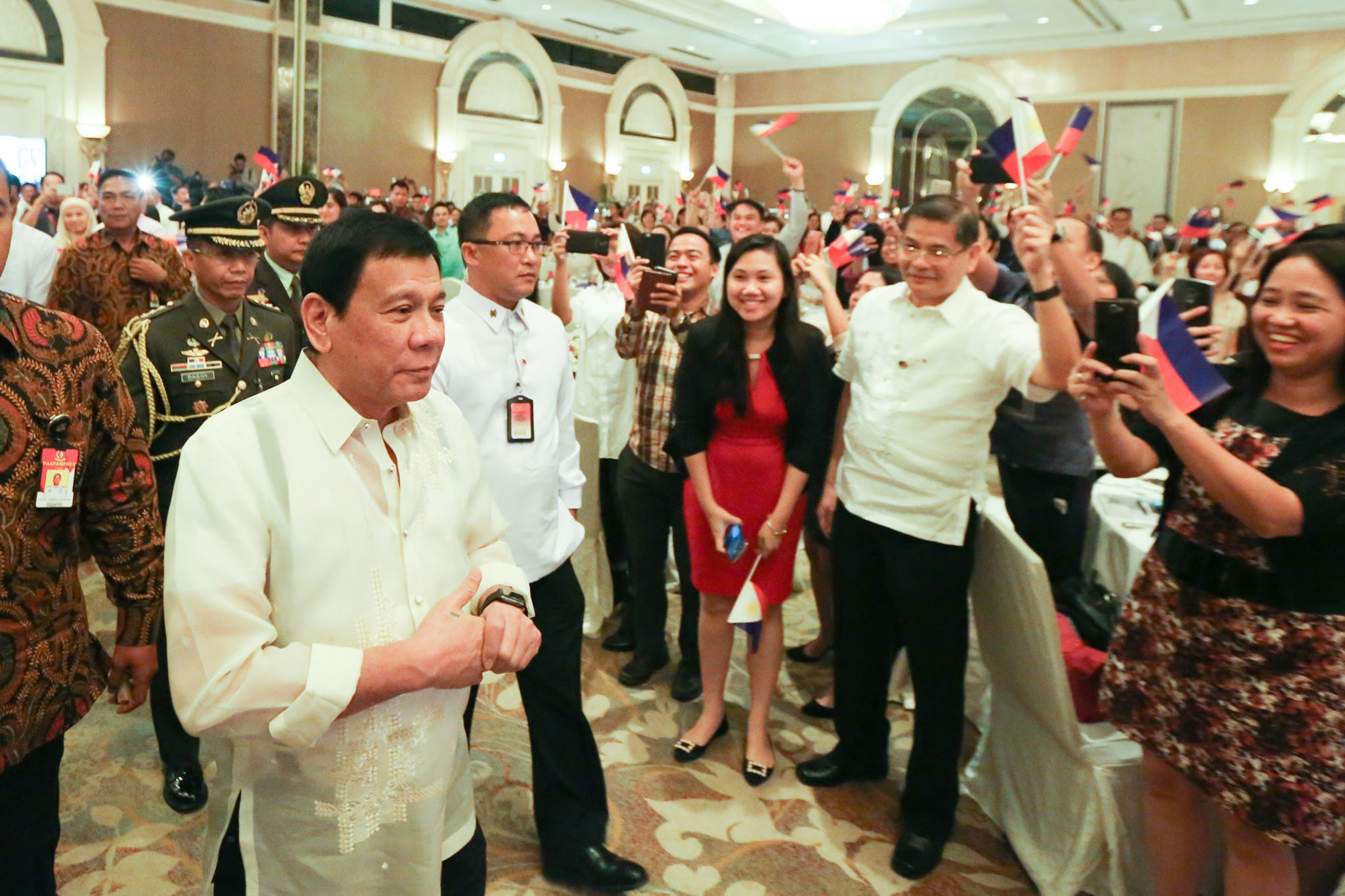
- President Rodrigo Duterte meets with Filipino community in Indonesia during his working visit in 2016

Total population
- 7,400 (2022)

Regions with significant populations
- Jakarta Metropolitan Area, Manado, Bandung, Surabaya, Makassar, Nunukan, Tarakan, Balikpapan

Languages
- Filipino, Indonesian, Hiligaynon, Cebuano, Chavacano, Sama–Bajau, Tausug, English

Religion
- Christianity, Islam

Related ethnic groups
- Overseas Filipinos

Filipinos in Indonesia were estimated to number 7,400 individuals as of 2022, according to the statistics of the Philippine government. Most are based in Jakarta, though there is also a community in Surabaya and other major cities in Indonesia. This represented growth of nearly five times over the government's 1998 estimate of 1,046 individuals.

== Employment ==
Unlike many other overseas Filipino communities, Filipinos in Indonesia consist largely of skilled professionals, especially in the advertising industries and as teachers in international schools where their English skills are most needed. 20% also work in finance, especially as accountants.

Some Filipinos also work as fishermen on Indonesian waters. However, some have fished illegally and have faced a crackdown with the consequence of deportation by Indonesian authorities.

== Inter-ethnic relations ==
Filipinos in Indonesia generally maintain good interethnic relations with their Indonesian neighbours, with whom they feel culturally closer than Europeans or Americans; Indonesians stereotype Filipinos as being gregarious and cheerful. However, there are fears that Filipinos in Indonesia may become the targets of kidnappings by local militant groups such as Jemaah Islamiyah in an attempt to secure the release of JI members imprisoned in Philippine jails.

== Community ==
Filipinos in Indonesia have formed eight different community associations, including three sports teams, one teachers' association, and two Christian groups. The annual Philippine Independence Day celebrations attract numerous participants.

More traditional communities of Filipino descent had migrated to the pre-independence Indonesian territory, which was then still called the Dutch East Indies. Most of them have kinship across the borders of the two countries, like the Sangir people also have their relatives in Sarangani and Davao, the Philippines, but their homeland is in the Sangihe Islands, Indonesia. Another case is the Tausug and Bajau peoples who have long inhabited the east coast of Kalimantan, inhabiting the former Sulu Sultanate, such as Nunukan and Tarakan in North Kalimantan, as well as Malay nobles such as Berau and Tidung also have mixed Sulu blood.

== Notable people ==
- Agus Musin Dasaad, conglomerate, member of the BPUPK
- Amanda Manopo, actress, model and entrepreneur
- Amelia De La Rama, actress and socialite, 10th wife of Sukarno
- Antonio Blanco, painter
- Biboy Enguio, basketball player
- Eddy Mendieta, actor
- Jeremy Thomas, actor, model and businessman
- Leo Consul, actor, singer, former presenter of Eat Bulaga! Indonesia
- Lydia Kandou, actress model and singer
- Maribeth Pascua, actress and musician
- Paula Bataona Renyaan, politician and police general, the Vice Governor of Maluku (1998-2003) and the first female Vice Governor in Indonesia

== See also ==
- Indonesians in the Philippines
- Indonesia–Philippines relations
