= Indonesians in the Philippines =

Expatriates and immigrants from Indonesia residing in the Philippines

Warga Keturunan Indonesia di Filipina (Indonesian) Mga Indones/Indonesiano sa Pilipinas (Filipino)

Total population
- 43,871 (2000)

Regions with significant populations
- Mindanao, Metro Manila

Languages
- Bisaya, Tagalog, Sangirese, Indonesian

Religion
- Sunni Islam, Catholicism, Protestant Christianity

Related ethnic groups
- Austronesian peoples

Indonesians in the Philippines consist of expatriates and immigrants from Indonesia residing in the Philippines, and their descendants. Among them were many formerly stateless people, legally called Persons of Indonesian descent (PID), whom the United Nations and the governments of the two countries helped to acquire citizenship.

According to the 2000 Philippines census, there were 43,871 Indonesians in the Philippines, making them the 5th-largest group of foreigners in the Philippines. Most reside in Mindanao, especially in Davao del Sur, Davao del Norte, Davao Oriental, Sarangani, Sultan Kudarat, Cotabato, South Cotabato, General Santos and Davao City, although there is also a sizable Indonesian population in Metro Manila.

As the two countries are neighbors, there have been many historical migrations between the islands that today make up their national territories, and migrants from what is today Indonesia helped form many historical dynasties in the Philippines.

== Migration and settlement ==
=== Ancient and Islamic eras ===
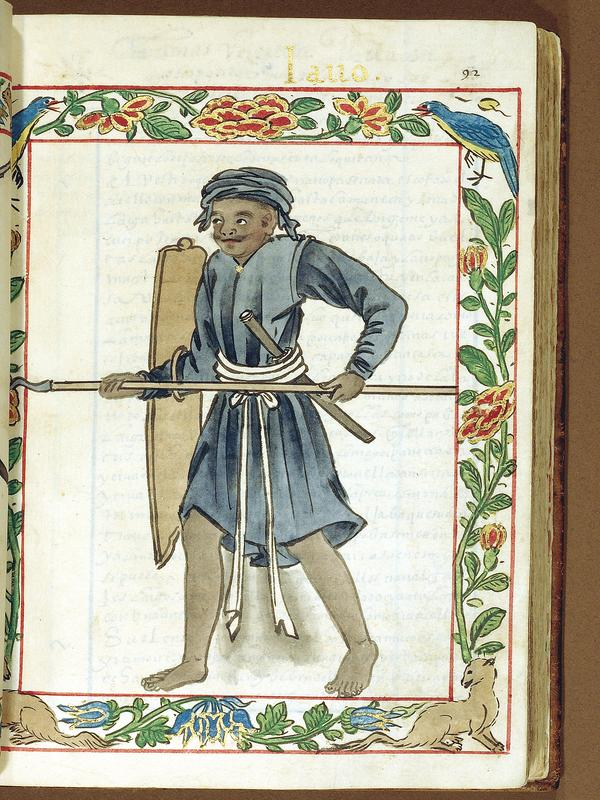
Warrior from Java in the Philippines, c. 1590 in Boxer Codex

Migrations between the territories that today make up Indonesia and the Philippines were extremely common during the ancient-era. The people of Indonesia are descendants of a common migration from the Philippines and Taiwan. Certain tribes, mostly from Sumatra and Borneo back-migrated to the Philippines, particularly to the central and southern parts. According to Visayan legend, Sri Lumay, a Malay-Tamil prince from Sumatra was one of the earliest major settlers to Visayas. He found the Rajahnate of Cebu, and his descendants played a key role in the Spanish conquest of the Philippines.

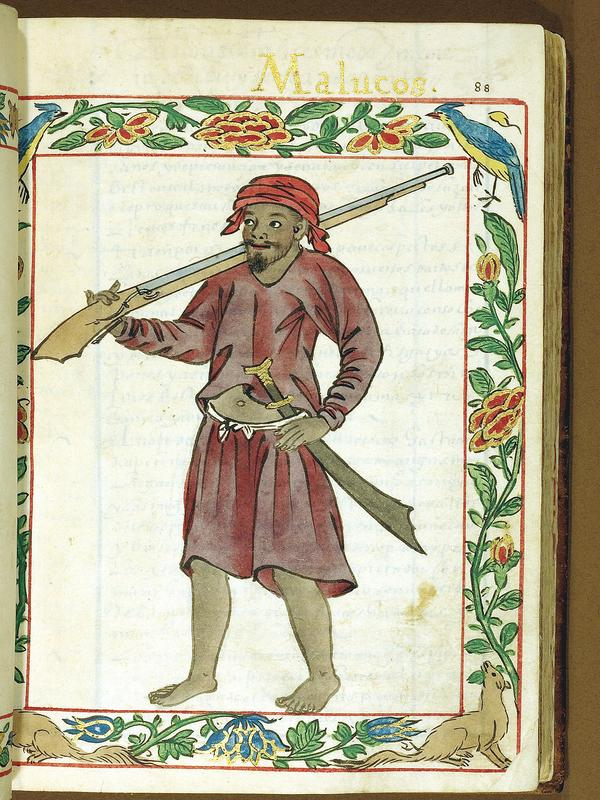
Moluccan Warrior in the Philippines, c. 1590 in Boxer Codex

The Sulu Archipelago was under the jurisprudence and sphere of influence of the Javanese Majapahit Empire. The Laguna Copperplate Inscription, the Philippines' oldest document found, also records interactions between the Classical Tagalog kingdoms in Luzon to that of those in modern-day Indonesia. The people of the two countries also spoke the Malay language as a lingua franca.

During the age of Islamic sultanates and states, preachers from Sumatra helped spread Islam. Rajah Baguinda, a Minangkabau prince from Sumatra, spread Islam to the people of the Sulu Archipelago. He became a founding father for the Sultanate of Sulu. Islam in Mindanao was also introduced by the Ternateans.

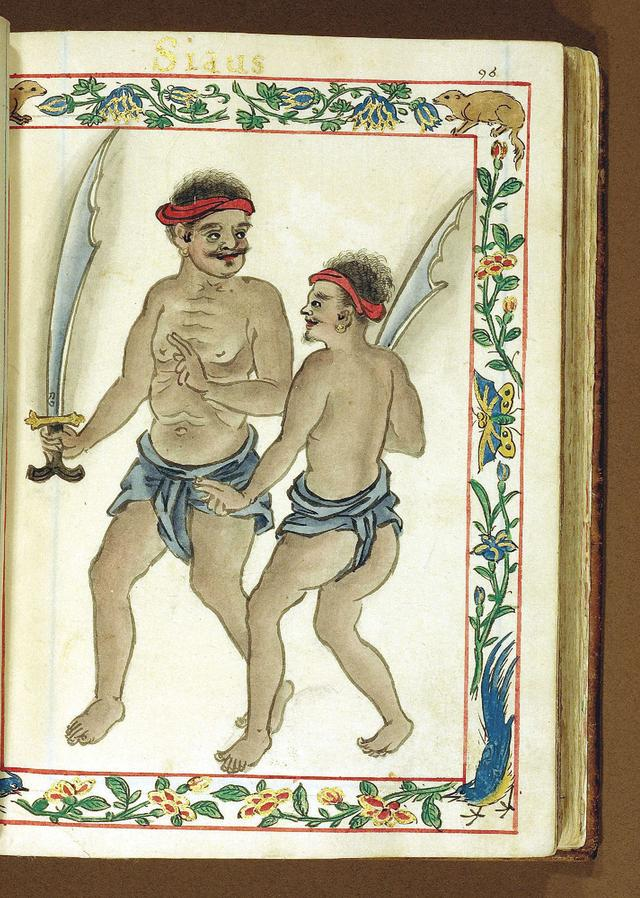
Warriors from Siau Island, Sangir Archipelago in the Philippines, c. 1590 Boxer Codex

During the Spanish colonial era, most if any migrants or descendants of migrants from modern-day Indonesia were assimilated either into the Hispanized Catholic population or the Moro Muslim population. For a while, the Spanish had tried to colonize eastern Indonesia, particularly the Maluku Islands, sharing it with the Portuguese. In 1606, the Spanish conquered the Ternate Sultanate, deporting the Sultan and his family to Manila. Ternate Sultanate included Ternate Island, North Sulawesi, and Sangihe Islands. The Spanish colonists shared it with the Dutch, and abandoned it in 1663.

=== Modern-day ===
From 1925 to 1926, famous Indonesian national hero and ex-PKI member Tan Malaka lived in Manila. There, he became a correspondent of the nationalist newspaper El Debate, edited by Francisco Varona. Publication of Malaka's works, such as a second edition of Naar de Republiek Indonesia (December 1925) and Semangat Moeda (Young Spirit; 1926) might have been supported by Varona. There, Malaka also met Mariano de los Santos, José Abad Santos, and Crisanto Evangelista, one of the founders of the Partido Komunista ng Pilipinas.

Some Indonesians, mostly from Sangirs background, came to Mindanao as early as the 1970s, settling down and marrying local women; most Indonesian Sangir living in the Philippines are Protestant Christians by faith. However, the largest influx, consisting of fishermen and petty traders, began settling illegally in the early 1980s. They continue to maintain consciousness of their separate ethnic identity, as well as material links with Indonesia. Illegal entry and settlement is easy due to the Philippines' long coastline and insufficient personnel in the Border Crossing Office. More recently, many of the fishermen in fact have landing permits which allow them to move freely around the area where their boats are docked.

== Registration, residency, and repatriation ==
As early as 1990, the Philippine government had been attempting to get Indonesians to register with the authorities, holding out the possibility that they might be granted citizenship as an incentive. However, a survey the next year, which counted 7,200 Indonesians living illegally in the area, found that few wanted to be naturalized in the Philippines, though they hoped to obtain permanent residency in order to regularize their living situation, while 30-35% hoped to be repatriated to Indonesia. That survey found the largest community of Indonesians in Sarangani province, with others in South Cotabato, Sultan Kudarat, Davao City, Davao del Norte, Davao Oriental, and Cotabato. At that time, they planned to deport 1,738 of them. In 2002, the Philippine government, alarmed by the number of Indonesian nationals implicated in recent Jemaah Islamiyah bombings in the Philippines, drew up a plan to deport a further 12,000 Indonesians from Mindanao; however, the implementation of the plan stalled due to disagreements between the Philippine and Indonesian governments over who would pay for it. Indonesians in the Philippines are often stereotyped as terrorists as a result.

The militants responsible for the 2005 beheadings of Christians in Sulawesi were also trained in the southern Philippines.

In 2003 and again in 2005, the Philippine government initiated another survey and registration drive; that one registered 2,448 Philippine-born Indonesians, including 247 in General Santos, 371 in Glan, Sarangani, 265 in Davao del Sur, 108 in Davao City, 339 in Kiamba, Sarangani, Tupi, South Cotabato and Malapatan, Sarangani, another 253 in Sarangani Island, 341 in Isulan, Sultan Kudarat and Kidapawan, and an additional 154 in Sarangani and Davao del Sur. The Indonesian government is also attempting to convince them to register with the local Indonesian consulate and with the Philippine government, and offered to pay their registration fees for identity documents.

In 2015, UNHCR recorded at least 8,756 registered Indonesians in Mindanao are at risk of statelessness. A year later, 664 stateless people of Indonesian descent in Mindanao were granted Philippine or Indonesian citizenship as part of a joint program between the Philippine government and Indonesian consulate to end statelessness for people of Indonesian descent living in the country. They were given a choice of either Indonesian or Filipino citizenship. Of the 664, 536 people were confirmed to have become Filipino citizens, and 128 chose to become Indonesian citizens. As of February 2016, there are 8,745 registered PIDs in Southern Philippines, consist of 3,155 in Sarangani, 2,777 in Davao Del Sur, 859 in General Santos, 688 in South Cotabato, 679 in Davao Oriental, 279 in Davao City, 176 in Sultan Kudarat, and 133 in Cotabato.

== Education ==
According to the study conducted by the UNHCR in 2012, more than 6,000 persons of Indonesian descent in southern Philippines are having problematic access to education, due to their unclear citizenship status and poverty they experienced.

Meanwhile, the Philippines is becoming an increasingly popular destination for Indonesian international students, both those in short term courses, and those studying for university degrees. English as a foreign language courses are one well-known draw for students from all over Asia, but other subject areas are gaining in popularity as well. In particular, flight training courses are much cheaper in the Philippines than in Indonesia. The Asian Institute of Management also attracts many Indonesian students. There is also an Indonesian school (with dormitory for boarding students) and Indonesian Cultural Center called "House of Indonesia" in Davao City.

There are also many Indonesians in Metro Manila, mostly Chinese-Indonesian, who are either university students or medical residents (mostly Dermatology and Pediatrics).

== Notable people ==
- Hans Smit - Indonesian-born soccer coach who lives in the Philippines since childhood and is married to a Filipina with 4 Filipino-born children and became a naturalized Filipino citizen in 2015.
- Wilbert Ross - actor, singer and entertainer of Chinese-Indonesian descent

== See also ==
- Filipinos in Indonesia
- Malays in the Philippines
- Indonesia–Philippines relations
