= Samsi Sastrawidagda =

Indonesian politician (1894–1963)

Dr. Samsi Sastrawidagda
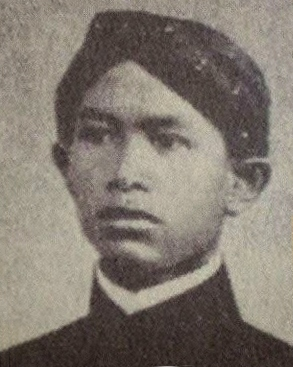
- Official portrait, c. 1945

1st Minister of Finance
- In office 2 September – 26 September 1945
- President: Sukarno
- Preceded by: Office established
- Succeeded by: A. A. Maramis

Member of the BPUPK
- In office 28 May – 7 August 1945
- Preceded by: Organization established
- Succeeded by: Organization abolished

Personal details
- Born: 13 March 1894 Surakarta, Dutch East Indies
- Died: 1963 (aged 68-69)

Samsi Sastrawidagda (13 March 1894 – 1963) was an Indonesian politician who was the first Minister of Finance of Indonesia, serving for just under one month in September 1945. He was also one of the founders of the Indonesian National Party.

== Early life and education ==
He was born in Surakarta on 13 March 1894. He was a graduate of a Hollandsch-Inlandsche School and went to the Netherlands in 1913 with a scholarship from Budi Utomo, graduating from a teachers' training school. He continued his studies at the Rotterdam Trade School, graduating with his dissertation De Ontwikkeling v.d handels politik van Japan (The Development of the Trade Politics of Japan). In the Netherlands, he was recruited to teach Javanese and Malay. He also travelled to Denmark in 1925 with Mohammad Hatta to study cooperative business there.

== Career ==
After returning to Indonesia, Samsi was one of the founders of the Indonesian National Party (PNI) on 4 July 1927, along with Sukarno, Sartono, and Iskaq Tjokrohadisurjo among others. He was appointed as party commissioner. During this period, Samsi worked in Bandung, where he leased the veranda of Sukarno's home for use as his accountant's office. Later, he moved to Surabaya after the arrest of many nationalists and the disbandment of PNI, and there he joined Partindo.

Prior to the Japanese invasion of Indonesia in 1942, Samsi was considered by the Japanese as a potential fifth columnist which would aid the invasion, though such efforts ended up unnecessary. During the occupation, he was a member of the Japanese-established Central Advisory Council and labor organization Pusat Tenaga Rakyat, in addition to being an adviser to the Finance Department of the occupation government. He was also appointed as a member of the Investigating Committee for Preparatory Work for Independence (BPUPK).

Following the proclamation of Indonesian independence, Samsi was appointed as the Finance Minister in the first Indonesian cabinet. During his brief tenure, Samsi attempted to raise funds for the new government by accessing leftover funds from the previous Dutch East Indies government seized by the Japanese following the invasion. One such source was a bank in Surabaya, and obtaining it was made possible due to Samsi's close connections with Japanese military officers. A "robbery" was arranged in order to hide the Japanese officers' involvement. The act raised money for both the central republican government and for the local militia units in Surabaya. He resigned for health reasons on 26 September 1945 and was replaced by Alexander Andries Maramis. Samsi served in the ministerial post from 2 to 26 September 1945.

He died in 1963.
