= Embassy of Indonesia, Manila =

Diplomatic mission of the Republic of Indonesia to the Philippines

Embassy of the Republic of Indonesia in Manila Kedutaan Besar Republik Indonesia di Manila Embahada ng Indonesia sa Maynila

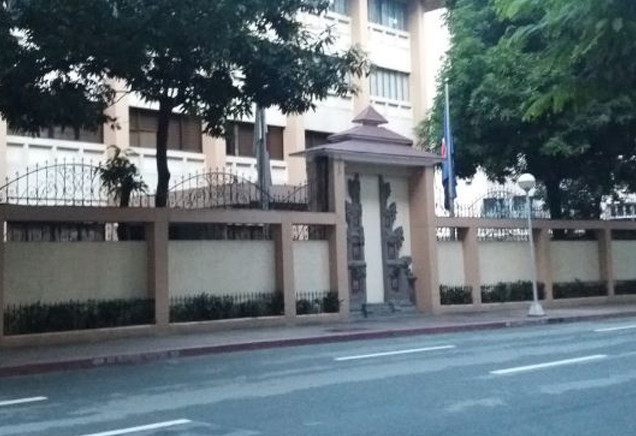
- Location: Manila, Philippines
- Address: 185 Salcedo Street; Makati City 1229, Metro Manila
- Coordinates: 14°33′29″N 121°0′54″E
- Ambassador: Agus Widjojo
- Jurisdiction: Philippines; Marshall Islands; Palau
- Website: kemlu.go.id/manila/en

The Embassy of the Republic of Indonesia in Manila (Indonesian: Kedutaan Besar Republik Indonesia di Manila) is the diplomatic mission of the Republic of Indonesia to the Philippines. The embassy is located at 185 Salcedo Street in Makati City, Metro Manila and is currently headed by Ambassador Agus Widjojo which was appointed by President Joko Widodo on 12 January 2022.

== History ==
Indonesia established diplomatic relations with the Philippines in 1949 and opened its consular office in Manila. Indonesia then opened its embassy headed by an ambassador in the 1950s. Its first ambassador was Alexander Andries Maramis which took office from 1950 to 1953.

== See also ==
- Indonesia–Philippines relations
- List of diplomatic missions in Indonesia
- List of diplomatic missions in Philippines
