= Paul Sorensen =

American actor

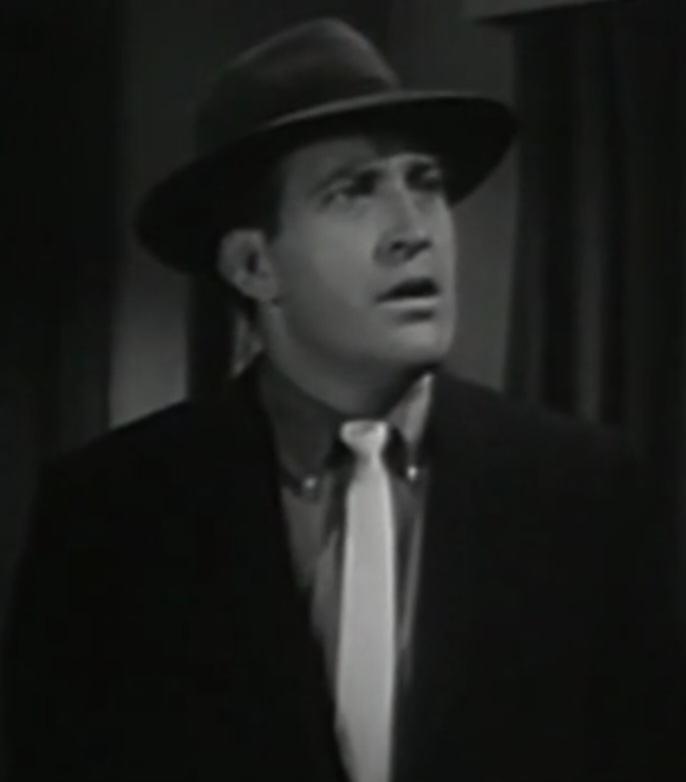
- Sorensen in an episode of Lock-Up (1960)
- Born: February 16, 1926; Kenosha, Wisconsin, U.S.
- Died: July 17, 2008 (aged 82); Cardiff-by-the-Sea; San Diego County; California, U.S.
- Occupations: Actor; minister
- Spouse: Jacqueline May Sorensen (m. 1957; died 2002)
- Children: 2
- Military career
- Conflicts: Korean War

Paul Sorensen (February 16, 1926 – July 17, 2008) was an American film, theater and television actor who appeared in hundreds of roles during his career, including The Brady Bunch and Dallas. He was frequently cast in westerns or as a police officer.

== Early years ==
Sorenson was born in Kenosha, Wisconsin. He moved to Hollywood, California, in 1945 and enrolled in the Pasadena Playhouse, from which he graduated two years later.

Sorenson served 15 months with the U.S. Army's 25th Division during the Korean War.

== Career ==
Sorensen returned to California after the war and resumed acting. His professional stage debut came in Born Yesterday at the Sartu Theater.

A talent agent signed Sorenson after watching him perform in a theater production of Born Yesterday. He was cast in his first television role as the deputy-turned-bandit Billy Stiles in the 1954-1955 syndicated Stories of the Century, a western series starring and narrated by Jim Davis.

One of Sorensen's best known characters was a recurring role as Andy Bradley, a member of an oil cartel, on Dallas. He appeared in recurring television roles in The Brady Bunch, Barnaby Jones and Fred MacMurray's My Three Sons. His television career, which spanned from the 1950s to the 1980s also included work on The Mary Tyler Moore Show, My Favorite Martian, The Rockford Files and The Mod Squad. Sorensen was often cast in such westerns as Jefferson Drum, The Rifleman, Rin Tin Tin, Gunsmoke, Have Gun, Will Travel, The High Chaparral, Cheyenne, Cimarron City, Johnny Ringo, Wagon Train, The Virginian, and The Big Valley.

Sorensen's film credits included Hang 'em High, Westworld, and Escape to Witch Mountain.

Off screen, Sorensen and twenty-four other actors founded the Orchard Gables Repertory Theater group, which Time magazine has praised as "an oasis in the heart of Hollywood." Sorensen and his wife Jacqueline also ran the Original Actors Workshop.

== Later years ==
Sorensen retired from acting during the late 1980s and early 1990s. Sorensen, his wife, and one of their two sons, Christian, all became ordained ministers and the youngest son David followed in his parents footsteps and worked behind the scenes in the entertainment industry.

== Personal life ==
He married Jacqueline May in September 1957; she died on November 14, 2002. Sorensen died on July 17, 2008, in Cardiff-by-the-Sea, California, at the age of eighty-two. He was survived by his sons, a sister, and a grandson.

== Recognition ==
He was honored by the Pasadena Playhouse with a lifetime achievement award.

== Selected filmography ==
- Las Vegas Shakedown (1955) - Airplane Passenger (uncredited)
- Inside Detroit (1956) - Blair's U.A.W. Friend (uncredited)
- Glory (1956) - Police Radio Dispatcher (uncredited)
- The Women of Pitcairn Island (1956) - Sam Allard
- The Brass Legend (1956) - Burly Apache Bend Townsman
- Dance with Me, Henry (1956) - Dutch
- Battle Hymn (1957) - Sentry
- House of Numbers (1957) - Patrolman (uncredited)
- Death Valley Days (1958) - S7 E11 "Quon Lee" - Nick
- The True Story of Lynn Stuart (1958) - Truck Driver (uncredited)
- Wagon Train (1959) - S2 E30 "The Duke LeMay Story" - Deputy Bart Williams
- Seven Ways from Sundown (1960) - Townsman of Beeker's Crossing (uncredited)
- Sea Hunt (1960, Season 3, Episode 14) - Pete
- The Great Impostor (1961) - Guard (uncredited)
- The Steel Claw (1961) - Sgt. Frank Powers
- Flower Drum Song (1961) - TV Sheriff (uncredited)
- Kid Galahad (1962) - Joe (uncredited)
- It's a Mad, Mad, Mad, Mad World (1963) - Hardhat in crowd next to Joe E Brown. (uncredited)
- Captain Newman, M.D. (1963) - Military Policeman at Christmas Party (uncredited)
- The Satan Bug (1965) - SDI Agent Posing as Motorist at Accident (uncredited)
- Torn Curtain (1966) - Swedish Immigration Officer (uncredited)
- Chamber of Horrors (1966) - Baltimore Bartender (uncredited)
- The Monkees (1966) – Red in S1:E11, "Monkees à la Carte"
- A Guide for the Married Man (1967) - Detective (uncredited)
- Madigan (1968) - Benesh Look-Alike in Saloon
- Hang 'Em High (1968) - Prisoner on Scaffold
- Live a Little, Love a Little (1968) - Workman (uncredited)
- Mark of the Gun (1969) - Sheriff
- The Big Bounce (1969) - Senator's associate
- Support Your Local Sheriff! (1969) - Man Installing Jail Cell Bars (uncredited)
- Suppose They Gave a War and Nobody Came (1970) - Deputy Randy
- Evel Knievel (1971) - Head Guard
- The Resurrection of Zachary Wheeler (1971) - Thompson
- Honky (1971)
- Girls on the Road (1972) - Mr. Rae
- Mission Impossible (1972) - Tower Guard /TV Episode: "Committed"
- Lapin 360 (1972)
- One Little Indian (1973) - The Guard
- Westworld (1973) - 2nd Male Interviewee (uncredited)
- Executive Action (1973) - Officer Brown
- Chopper One (1974) - Policeman
- Escape to Witch Mountain (1975) - Police Sgt. Foss
- The Shaggy D.A. (1976) - Policeman in Squad Car (uncredited)
- Smokey and the Bandit (1977) - DOT Inspector (uncredited)
- First Family (1980) - C.I.A. Director Willie O'Malley
- Star Trek III: The Search for Spock (1983) - Captain
- Cage (1989) - Matt
- Dropping Evil (2012) - Secret Service Agent (uncredited) (final film role)
