= Suryatati Abdul Manan =

Indonesian politician

Dra. Hj. Suryatati Abdul Manan
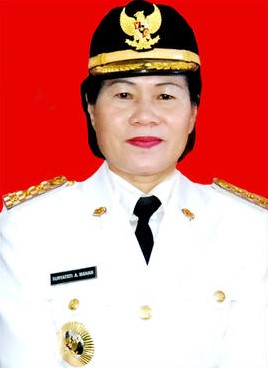

Mayor of Tanjungpinang
- In office 19 April 1996 – 16 January 2013 (Note: As administrative mayor (19 April 1996 – 23 October 2001), acting mayor (23 October 2001 – 16 January 2003), and mayor (16 January 2003 – 16 January 2013))
- Deputy: Wan Izhar Abdullah (2003–2008); Edward Mushalli (2008–2013)
- Preceded by: Andi Rivai Siregar (as the Administrative Mayor of Tanjungpinang)
- Succeeded by: Lis Darmansyah
- Majority: 76% – 2002; 84,25% – 2007

Personal details
- Born: 14 April 1953 (age 72) Tanjungpinang, Riau Regency, Central Sumatra, Indonesia
- Spouse: Achmad Subroto

Dra. Hj. Suryatati Abdul Manan (born 14 April 1953) was an Indonesian politician who became the first mayor of Tanjungpinang.

== Early life ==
Manan was born on 14 April 1953 in the city of Tanjungpinang, as the daughter of Abdul Manan and Bahariah. After her birth, her parents moved to Bengkalis. She enrolled at the elementary school No. 1 (SDN 01) in Bengkalis and graduated in 1965. She then moved back to Tanjungpinang, continued her junior high school and senior high school studies there and graduated respectively in 1968 and 1971.

Before her graduation, she originally wanted to become a teacher, but after she graduated, she wanted to study at the Medical Faculty. Her mother refused her to go to far, and instead enrolled her in the Fishery Faculty in the University of Riau. After several months, Manan became interested entering the Academy of Internal Affairs Education, which offered scholarships and grants. Eventually, she moved to the academy to ease the burden of her parents. (Note: Original text: ...saya pindah untuk meringankan beban orangtua...) She graduated from the academy in 1976.

== Career ==
After graduating from the academy, she was employed as an ordinary civil employee. In 1979, she was appointed as the head of the Law Sub-Bureau in the Riau Islands Regency. In 1983, she was appointed as the Acting Head of Law Bureau for the Regional Secretariat of the Riau Islands Regency, and in 1985, she was appointed as the Acting Head of Economic Bureau. In 1983, she also attended the Institute for Government Education, and graduated from the institute in 1985.

From 1993 until 1995, she became the head of the West Tanjungpinang subdistrict. During her term as the head of the subdistrict, she focused on environmental and social problems of the subdistrict.

== As the Administrative Mayor of Tanjungpinang ==
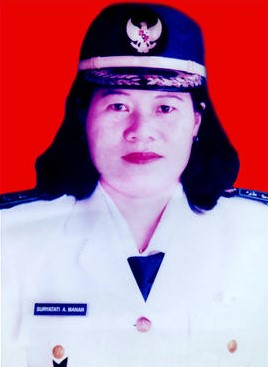
Suryatati Abdul Manan as the Administrative Mayor of Tanjungpinang.

Manan was inaugurated as the Administrative Mayor of Tanjungpinang on 19 April 1996 by the Deputy Governor of Riau, Abdul Rivaie Rahman.

Manan struggled to upgrade the status of Tanjungpinang from an administrative city to an autonomous city. Since November 2000, she frequently lobbied the government of the Riau Province and the central government regarding the possibility of upgrading the status of Tanjungpinang. In February 2001, the Ministry of Internal Affairs responded the struggle by forming a study team from the University of Indonesia to assess the feasibility of Tanjungpinang to obtain the status of an autonomous city. By April 2001, the study team had submitted the bill about the upgrade of Tanjungpinang's status to the People's Representative Council.

During her term, Manan managed to increase the regional income of the city to IDR 29 trillion ($2.8 million). She stated that the income largely came from the tourism and trade sector. She also remarked that such amount of regional income is huge, even by comparing it to the autonomous city.

In 1999, she was nominated as the possible candidate for the Regent of the Riau Islands. She lost the election to Huzrin Hood.

== As the Mayor of Tanjungpinang ==
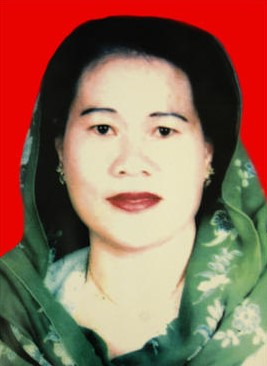
Suryatati Abdul Manan as the acting Mayor of Tanjungpinang.

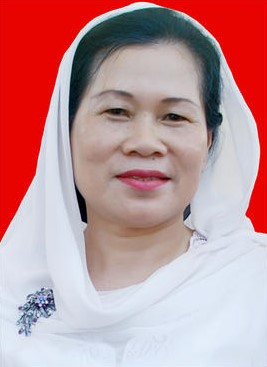
Suryatati Abdul Manan as the Mayor of Tanjungpinang.

=== Election and inauguration ===
On 17 October 2001, the Minister of Internal Affairs at that time, Hari Sabarno, declared the Tanjungpinang city as an autonomous city, and on 23 October 2001, the Governor of Riau at that time, Saleh Djasit, inaugurated Manan as the acting mayor of Tanjungpinang.

At the election for the position of definitive mayor on 22 December 2002, Manan and her candidate for deputy mayor, Wan Izhar, won the election, obtaining 19 out of 25 votes. She defeated other candidates, namely Nazief Susila Dharma and Fawzi Saleh. She was inaugurated on 16 January 2003.

On the first direct election ever held on 5 December 2007 to elect the Mayor of Tanjung Pinang, Manan, along with Edward Murshalli, the former Head of the Education Bureau, was nominated as the Mayor and Deputy Mayor of Tanjungpinang. She won the election by 84.25% of the votes, and was inaugurated as the mayor and deputy mayor on 16 January 2008. Her percentage of the votes was the most votes ever obtained by a female mayor in an election.

=== Works ===
She focused her policies on improving the conditions of tourism sites in Tanjungpinang, and set Tanjungpinang as the main center for Malay culture in Indonesia. Her vision was to make tourism in Tanjungpinang based on cultural values. She stated that when she attempted to promote the city as the "City of Gurindam, Land of Gurindam", the attempt was responded by the opposition skeptically and cynically.

To improve the conditions for Malay culture to flourish, Manan began to open art galleries each month, and initiated a yearly art week in the city. She stated that due to her policies, the amount of artists are growing.

Other achievements that she obtained was that she managed to get the city to a high level of HDI, and the city also obtained the Adipura award for five times due to her success in maintaining cleanliness and management of the urban environment.

=== Poet ===
Manan has been creating and reciting poems since 1993, when her daughter presented her with a poem book for her 40th birthday. Since then, she used traditional poetry, the pantun, to express her opinion on issues such as governance, public complaints, corruption, prostitution, journalists and public servants.

As the mayor of Tanjungpinang, Manan implemented pantun into the daily lives of students in the city. Pantun lessons have been added as an extracurricular activity for schools at all levels, and every Monday for the past couple of years, elementary students have been asked to create their own pantun. Manan also planned to build a pantun castle, which was planned to record one million pantuns. As of 2009, Manan claimed to have collected 100 thousands pantuns.

Manan has also performed recitations during her term as a mayor. For example, she held a poem recitation from Tusiran Suseno and Syarifuddin at the Ismail Marzuki Park on 4 November 2006, and she also held another one in the Aisyah Sulaiman art house located at Tanjungpinang, which was attended by 200 people.

== Personal life ==
Manan was married to Abdul Manan. The marriage resulted in four children, namely Maya Suryanti, Agung Suryanto, Ririn Subroto, and Cory Primaturia.

== Bibliography ==
- Institution for Regional Autonomy Enforcement Advocacy (2005), Biografi / Profil Bupati & Walikota Seluruh Indonesia, Jakarta
