= Hari Sabarno =

Indonesian army officer and politician (1944–2019)

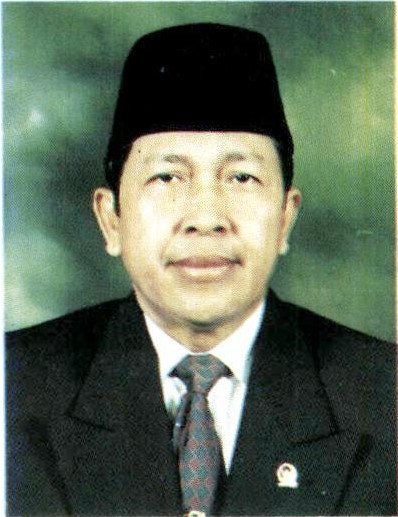
- Official portrait, 1997

Coordinating Minister for Political and Security Affairs Ad-interim
- In office 12 March 2004 – 20 October 2004
- President: Megawati Soekarnoputri
- Preceded by: Susilo Bambang Yudhoyono
- Succeeded by: Widodo Adi Sutjipto

24th Minister of Home Affairs
- In office 10 August 2001 – 20 October 2004
- President: Megawati Soekarnoputri
- Preceded by: Soerjadi Soedirdja
- Succeeded by: Mohammad Ma'ruf

Deputy Speaker of the People's Consultative Assembly ABRI/TNI & Polri Faction
- In office 23 May 1998 – 9 August 2001
- President: B. J. Habibie; Abdurrahman Wahid
- Speaker: Harmoko; Amien Rais
- Preceded by: Syarwan Hamid
- Succeeded by: Agus Widjojo

Personal details
- Born: 12 August 1944 Surakarta, Central Java, Japanese East Indies
- Died: 31 May 2019 (aged 74) Jakarta, Indonesia
- Spouse: R. A. Dewi Margawati
- Children: 2
- Education: Indonesian Military Academy (1967)
- Occupation: Military; Politician

Military service
- Allegiance: Indonesia
- Branch/service: Indonesian Army
- Years of service: 1967—2001
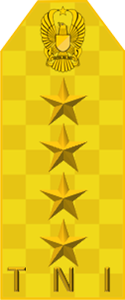
- Rank: General (honorary)
- Unit: Infantry

Hari Sabarno (12 August 1944 – 31 May 2019) was an Indonesian army officer and former Minister of Home Affairs.

== Early life and career ==
On 12 March 2004, he was appointed by Megawati Soekarnoputri to be the interim Coordinating Minister for Political and Security Affairs replacing Susilo Bambang Yudhoyono who resigned from the post. Hari Sabarno also served as Minister of Home Affairs.

== Corruption ==
When he served as Minister of Home Affairs, there was a case of corruption in the procurement of Fire Trucks in 22 regions in Indonesia in 2002. This case dragged former Director General of Regional Autonomy Oentarto Sindung Mawardi and a number of regional heads to prison. Oentarto and a number of regional heads said Hari had to take responsibility for the corruption.

Political offices
Preceded by Susilo Bambang Yudhoyono	Coordinating Minister for Political and Security Affairs (Ad-interim); 2004–2004	Succeeded by Widodo Adi Sutjipto
Preceded by Soerjadi Soedirdja	Minister of Home Affairs; 2001–2004	Succeeded by Mohammad Ma'ruf
Preceded by Syarwan Hamid	Deputy Speaker of the People's Consultative Assembly; ABRI/TNI & Polri Faction; 1998–2001	Succeeded by Agus Widjojo
Government offices
Preceded by Soerjadi Soedirdja	Head of the National Land Agency; 2001	Succeeded by Lutfi I. Nasoetion
