= Amelia De La Rama =

Filipina actress (born 1927)

- Born: Amelia Amante; 1927; Bulacan, Central Luzon, Philippines
- Other names: Amelia De La Rama Braly
- Occupations: Actress; socialite
- Years active: 1947–1968
- Spouses: Sukarno (m. 1964; died 1970) James Willard Braly (m. 1971; div. 1985)
- Children: 1

Amelia Amante (born 1927), later known as Amelia De La Rama Braly, is a Filipino actress and socialite who was the 10th wife of Indonesian President Sukarno.

== Early life ==
Amante was born Amelia Amante in 1927 in Bulacan, Central Luzon, and was raised in a conservative family.

At age 15, she ran away from home to marry and later gave birth to her sole child, Jimmy De La Rama (born 1956), who became a boxer. Her husband died when she was 20, followed by her father, leaving her to raise her son and care for her mother alone. Rama married a lawyer who was a consultant in Hong Kong and a relative of the Osmena family from Cebu. Though the couple divorced, she retained his last name, "De La Rama", as her stage name.

In August 1963, Rama was introduced to Sukarno during a visit in Manila in the framework of Maphilindo when she was a top billed actress. After that meeting, they again met three times when Sukarno visited Manila or other countries. Photographers there described their relationship as unclear. With help from Jose Maria Sison, Sukarno later bought her a house in Forbes Park. Sukarno frequently gave Rama rubies, her birthstone, and called her Sampaguita, the national flower of the Philippines.

Their relationship is mentioned in a 1964 document held by President Ferdinand Marcos, which argued that Sukarno's relationship with Rama was only for expansion of the Far East Bank and Trust and Aguinaldo Development Corporation in Indonesia. They visited several countries together, dating at Tampaksiring Palace in Bali. They married secretly at Baiturrahim Mosque in Jakarta, in 1964, when Rama arrived in Jakarta. They remained together until Sukarno told her to leave Indonesia during the Transition to the New Order.

Their marriage lasted until Sukarno's death in June 1970 and was kept secret by her until February 1979, when she stated during an interview with The Standard after visiting Sukarno's grave in Blitar in which she described Sukarno as a man who could give understanding, love and tenderness and said that she had never met a man who was so easy to befriend and as polite as him. Rama said that she did not want the marriage to be announced because of Sukarno's position and her identity as a Filipino and mentioned the difficulties that arose when he married Dewi Sukarno. She said that she had promised Sukarno that she would not pay her respects when he died, but promised to visit his grave while scattering Sampaguita flowers and that she hoped to visit his grave when the restoration was complete. Rama gave another reason why she was not present at Sukarno's funeral: she wanted to remember him as she saw him, namely wearing a white uniform and carrying a command baton.

In 1971, six months after Sukarno's death, she married James Willard Braly, a retired United States Air Force pilot and aide to President Dwight Eisenhower. They divorced in 1985.

== Career ==
Rama started her career as an actress in a minor role in Pangarap Ko’y Ikaw Rin (1947) and Bulakenyo (1949). In 1961, she appeared in Warner Bros production The Steel Claw along with George Montgomery. Her last film appearance was in Manila, Open City (1968) in a minor role.

== Filmography ==
Year	Film	Role	Notes
1947	Pangarap Ko’y Ikaw Rin		Credited as Amelia Amante
1949	Bulakenyo		Credited as Amelia Amante
1961	The Steel Claw	Christina	
1968	Manila, Open City		Credited as Amelia Amante
