= Maria Walanda Maramis =

National Hero of Indonesia (1872–1924)

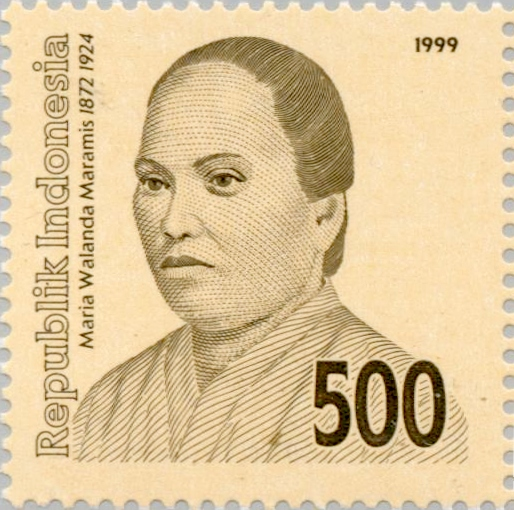
- Born: Maria Josephine Catherine Maramis; 1 December 1872; Kema, North Sulawesi, Dutch East Indies
- Died: 22 April 1924 (aged 51); Maumbi, North Sulawesi, Dutch East Indies
- Other name: Maria Walanda Maramis
- Spouse: Joseph Frederick Caselung Walanda
- Parent(s): Bernardus Maramis; Sarah Rotinsulu
- Relatives: Alexander Andries Maramis (nephew)

Maria Josephine Catherine Maramis (1 December 1872 – 22 April 1924), more commonly known as Maria Walanda Maramis, is recognized as a National Hero of Indonesia for her efforts to advance women's rights and conditions in Indonesia at the beginning of the 20th century.

== Early life ==
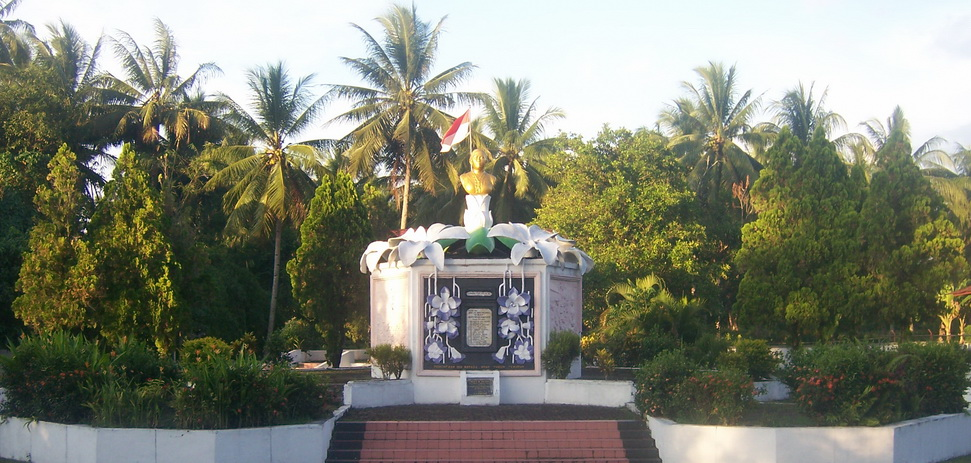
Maramis' tomb near Manado

Maria was born in Kema, a small town in the regency of North Minahasa in the province of North Sulawesi. Her parents were Maramis and Sarah Rotinsulu. She had a Christian family. She was the youngest of three children with a sister by the name of Antje and brother by the name of Andries. Andries Maramis was the father of Alexander Andries Maramis who later became involved in the independence of Indonesia and held ministerial and ambassadorship positions in the Indonesian government.

Maramis became an orphan at the age of six when her parents were both stricken with sickness and died one after the other in a short period of time. Maramis’ uncle, Rotinsulu, took the children to Maumbi where he was the District Chief (Indonesian: Hukum Besar) and raised them after the death of their parents. Maria and her sister attended Malay school (Indonesian: Sekolah Melayu). The name comes from the fact that the language used in the school was Malay language or an early term for the Indonesian language. The school taught basic knowledge, such as how to read and write, and some science and history. This would be the only formal education Maramis and her sister received as girls were expected to get married and become homemakers.

== PIKAT ==
After moving to Manado, Maramis started writing op-eds in a local newspaper called Tjahaja Siang. In these articles, she argued the importance of the role of mothers in the family unit. She stressed that the care and health of the family were the responsibility of the mother. A child's early education also came from the mother.

Realizing the need to equip young women for their roles as caretakers of their families, Maramis with the help of a few others established an organization called “The Love of a Mother toward her Children” (Indonesian: Percintaan Ibu Kepada Anak Turunannya (PIKAT)) on 8 July 1917. The purpose of this organization was to teach women with elementary school level education family matters, such as cooking, sewing, infant care, and hand-crafting.

Through the leadership of Maramis, PIKAT grew with the addition of branches around Minahasa, such as in Maumbi, Tondano, and Motoling. Branches in Java were also organized by local women in Batavia, Bogor, Bandung, Cimahi, Magelang, and Surabaya. On 2 June 1918, PIKAT opened a school in Manado. Maramis continued to be active in PIKAT until her death on 22 April 1924.

To honor her contributions to the advancement of women in Indonesia, Maria Walanda Maramis was named a national hero (Indonesian: Pahlawan Pergerakan Nasional) by the government of Indonesia on 20 May 1969.

== Voting rights of women in Minahasa ==
In 1919, a regional representative body for Minahasa (Dutch: Minahasa Raad) was established. Its members were originally selected, but elections were planned to pick subsequent members through popular vote. Only men were given the opportunity to become representatives, but Maramis championed the rights of women to cast votes to choose these representatives. Her efforts reached Batavia (now known as Jakarta; then called Betawi in Indonesian) and in 1921 the Dutch allowed the participation of women in the elections of representatives for the Minahasa Raad.

== Family life ==
Maramis married Joseph Frederick Caselung Walanda, a language teacher in 1890. After her marriage with Walanda, she became better known as Maria Walanda Maramis. They had three children. Two of the children were sent to teacher's school in Betawi (Jakarta). Anna Matuli Walanda went on to become a teacher and also participated in PIKAT.

== Tribute ==
On 1 December 2018, a Google Doodle was displayed to celebrate her 146th birthday.

== Bibliography ==
- (in Indonesian) Manus, M. (1985). Maria Walanda Maramis. Jakarta: Proyek Inventarisasi dan Dokumentasi Sejarah Nasional, Direktorat Sejarah dan Nilai Tradisional, Departemen Pendidikan dan Kebudayaan.
