= The Steel Claw (film) =

1961 film by George Montgomery

Steel Claw
- DVD cover
- Directed by: George Montgomery
- Screenplay by: Ferde Grofé Jr.; Marvin Wald; George Montgomery
- Produced by: Ferde Grofé Jr.; George Montgomery
- Starring: George Montgomery; Charito Luna; Mario Barri; Paul Sorensen; Amelia De La Rama; Carmen Austin; Ben Perez
- Cinematography: Manuel Rojas
- Edited by: Jack Murray
- Music by: Harry Zimmerman
- Distributed by: Warner Bros. Pictures
- Release date: September 20, 1961 (U.S.)
- Running time: 96 minutes
- Country: United States
- Language: English

The Steel Claw is a 1961 wartime drama set in the Philippines during the early days of World War II. It is an action-adventure film about a disabled Marine Captain on a mission to rescue an officer in the early days of the Japanese invasion. The Steel Claw was directed and co-scripted by its star, George Montgomery.

It has no relation to the comic book series Steel Claw.

== Plot ==
John Larsen, a Marine Captain stationed in the Philippines, had lost his right hand in an accident and is scheduled to be medically retired from the Corps. An American general is held captive by Filipino guerrillas behind Japanese lines and Larsen volunteers to rescue him. He fastens a steel prosthetic hook, the "steel claw" of the title, and embarks on the mission to rescue the general, which leads him and his team (Santana and his band of guerrillas) deep into the Philippines, where love and death await them. The film was shot in the Philippines around Manila.

== Cast ==
- George Montgomery as Capt. John Larsen
- Charito Luna as Lolita
- Mario Barri as Santana
- Paul Sorensen as Gen. Frank Powers
- Amelia De La Rama as Christina
- Carmen Austin as Rosa
- Ben Perez as Dolph Rodriguez
- Ferde Grofe Jr. as the Commander (credited as John MacGloan)
