= Paula Bataona Renyaan =

First woman to hold office in indonesia

Brigadier General (Police) Paula Bataona Renyaan
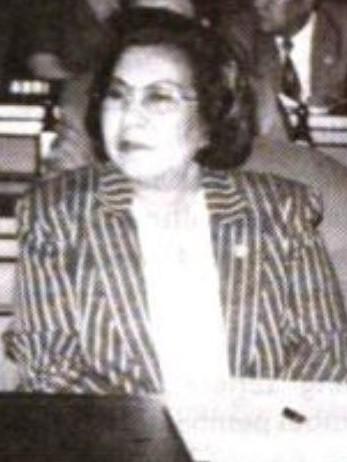

Vice Governor of Maluku
- In office 19 September 1998 – 15 September 2003
- President: B. J. Habibie; Abdurrahman Wahid; Megawati Soekarnoputri
- Governor: Saleh Latuconsina
- Preceded by: RS Soeranto
- Succeeded by: Abdullah Latuconsina

Member of the People's Representative Council
- In office 1 February 1991 – 15 September 1998
- Preceded by: Sadikoen Soegih Waras
- Succeeded by: Noldy Ratta
- Parliamentary group: Armed Forces

Personal details
- Born: Paula Renyaan; 16 September 1942 Saumlaki, Southeast Maluku, Japanese Occupied Dutch East Indies
- Died: 4 November 2007 (aged 65) Surabaya, East Java, Indonesia
- Spouse: Joseph Petrus Bataona (m. 1970)
- Parents: Petrus Paulus Renyaan (father); Kresensia Rebanyo (mother)

Military service
- Allegiance: Indonesia
- Branch/service: Indonesian Police
- Years of service: 1971—1999
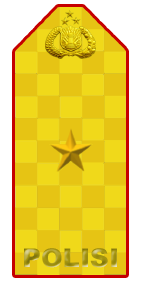
- Rank: Brigadier General
- Unit: Woman's Police (Polwan)

Paula Bataona Renyaan (16 September 1942 – 4 November 2007) was an Indonesian police general and politician. She was the first woman to hold the office of Vice Governor in Indonesia, serving as the Vice Governor of Maluku from 1998 to 2003.

== Early life ==
Renyaan was born on 16 September 1942 in Saumlaki, Southeast Maluku. She was born as the fifth and youngest child of Kresensia Rebanyo, a Filipino, and Petrus Paulus Renyaan, a Moluccan. She graduated from the People's School (equivalent to elementary school) in 1955, from the Junior High School in 1958, and from the Ambon Senior High School in 1962.

Following her graduation from the Ambon Senior High School in 1962, Renyaan was accepted at a biology academy in Bogor, and had rented a boarding house for the purpose. However, she changed her mind when she read a brochure about the University of Police Sciences (PTIK, Perguruan Tinggi Ilmu Kepolisian). She enrolled herself at the university at the local police station, and was accepted after finishing a series of procedures and tests.

Initially, after she was accepted to the university, her father banned her from becoming a female police officer. However, after her mother and her four brothers endorsed her decision, Renyaan's father changed his mind and followed suit.

She began her education at the university's basic training in Sukabumi in 1963. After that, she trained in Porong and Ujungpandang and finished with a second lieutenant rank in 1966. She enrolled on a baccalaureate and doctoral program in 1966. She graduated in 1971 with a doctoral degree.

== Police career ==
After graduating from the university, Renyaan was assigned her first job in the city of Surabaya, East Java. She began her career there as the head of the Women's Guidance Section and was promoted to commander of the Community Guidance Unit. She left the city in 1983 following a transfer to the city of Ambon, Maluku. She was assigned for two years in Ambon as the assistant for the Community Guidance and returned to East Java following a promotion to colonel in 1985.

In East Java, Renyaan served as the head of the Community Guidance Directorate for six years. Beside her police post, she also held other positions in different organizations, such as chairwoman of the Union of Indonesian Drumband in East Java, fourth deputy chairwoman of the Provincial Council of the Scouting Movement in East Java, and the chairwoman of the National Narcotics and Juvenile Delinquency Agency in East Java.

After her appointment as the member of the People's Representative Council in 1991, she did not hold any police offices.

In 1995, Renyaan was promoted from colonel to brigadier general. She became the third female police officer to hold the rank after Jeanne Mandagi and Roekmini. She officially retired from the police four years later on 8 July 1999 in a ceremony led by Police Chief Roesmanhadi at the Semarang Tri Brata Police Academy.

== Member of the People's Representative Council ==
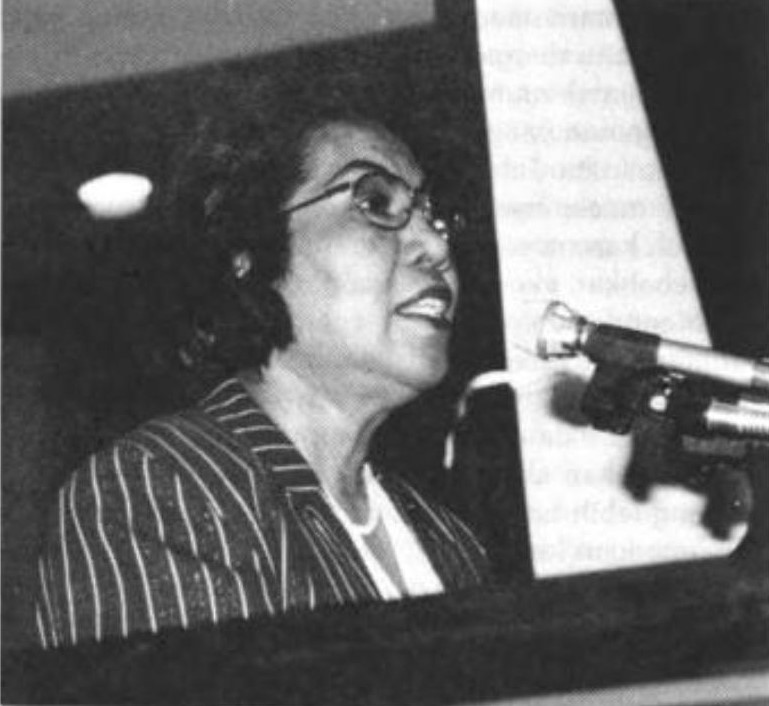
Paula Bataona Renyaan giving a speech about the taxation bill in 1997.

On 1 February 1991, Renyaan was inaugurated by Speaker Kharis Suhud as an interim replacement member of the People's Representative Council from the Armed Forces faction. She replaced the retired Colonel Sadikoen Soegih Waras.

After her term ended in 1992, she was appointed as the member of the People's Representative Council by the Armed Forces in 1992, and again in 1997. She relinquished her membership of the People's Representative Council on 15 August 1998. She was succeeded by female police officer Brigadier General Noldy Ratta, who was inaugurated on 14 October 1998.

=== Offices ===
- Member of the Commission V (1991—1992)
- Member of the Commission II (1992—1995)
- Member of the Commission IV (1995—1997)
- Deputy Chairwoman of the Special Committee for the Amendment of Code of Conduct of the People's Representative Council (1997)
- Secretary of the Armed Forces faction of the People's Representative Council (1992—1998)
- Member of the Working Body of the People's Consultative Assembly (1992—1997)

== Vice Governor of Maluku ==
=== Nomination and inauguration ===
At the special session of the Regional People's Representative Council of Maluku on 5 August 1998, the council unanimously approved the nomination of Renyaan as the vice governor of Maluku for the 1998–2003 term. She was inaugurated as vice governor on 19 September 1998 by Minister of Internal Affairs Syarwan Hamid. Her inauguration made her the first woman to hold the office of vice governor in Indonesia.

Renyaan stated that her approval as the vice governor of Maluku was in line with the ongoing female emancipation struggle in Indonesia. In her inauguration, Syarwan Hamid stated that Renyaan should spark the creativity of women in Indonesia in her capacity as the first female vice governor in Indonesia.

=== Demonstration by students ===
On her first day in office, a group of students led by Dino Umahuk from the Ambon Darussalam University demonstrated in front of the governor's office. Renyaan then walked from her office to join the demonstrators. She then stood in the middle of the demonstrators and start conducting the students who were singing demonstration songs.

After a while, Renyaan demanded the students to read out their attitude statement about the current condition of Maluku. Renyaan agreed with the students, and the students dissolved themselves.

== Later life and death ==
In 2006, Renyaan was diagnosed with breast cancer. During this period, Renyaan stayed in her house at Ngagel Street, Surabaya, for treatment. Renyaan died on 4 November 2007 in Surabaya, East Java.

== Personal life ==
Renyaan was married to Joseph Petrus Bataona, a sailor. She married him in 1970. They had two children, Elizabeth and Victor Bataona.

Renyaan was a Catholic.

== Awards ==
- Satyalancana Nararya
- Tunas Kencana (11 November 2013, posthumously)

== Bibliography ==
- Tim Penyusun (1997). "Buku Kenangan Anggota Dewan Perwakilan Rakyat Republik Indonesia 1992-1997" (PDF). Secretariat General of the People's Representative Council. Jakarta. Archived from the original (PDF) on 9 September 2018.
- Tim Penyusun (1992). "Dewan Perwakilan Rakyat Republik Indonesia Periode 1987-1992" (PDF). Secretariat General of the People's Representative Council. Jakarta. Archived from the original (PDF) on 2 May 2023.
