= Alexander Andries Maramis =

Indonesian politician and national hero

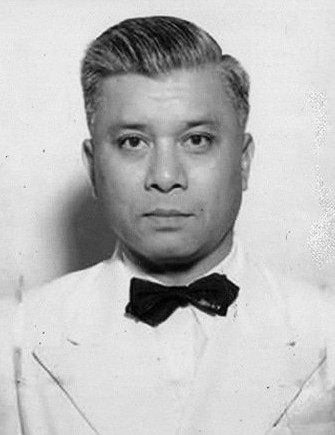
- Maramis, c. 1940s

Minister of Finance
- In office 26 September 1945 – 14 November 1945
- Preceded by: Samsi Sastrawidagda
- Succeeded by: Sunarjo Kolopaking
- In office 3 July 1947 – 19 December 1948
- Prime Minister: Amir Sjarifuddin; Mohammad Hatta
- Preceded by: Sjafruddin Prawiranegara
- Succeeded by: Lukman Hakim
- In office 13 July 1949 – 4 August 1949
- Prime Minister: Mohammad Hatta
- Preceded by: Lukman Hakim
- Succeeded by: Lukman Hakim

Minister of Foreign Affairs
- In office 19 December 1948 – 13 July 1949
- Preceded by: Agus Salim
- Succeeded by: Agus Salim
Ambassadorship posts
1st Ambassador of Indonesia to the Philippines
In office 1 February 1950 – 10 April 1953
1st Ambassador of Indonesia to West Germany
In office 1 May 1953 – 1 March 1956
Ambassador of Indonesia to the Soviet Union
In office 1 October 1956 – November 1959
Preceded by	L. N. Palar
Succeeded by	Adam Malik
Ambassador of Indonesia to Finland
In office 10 June 1958 – 1960

Personal details
- Born: 20 June 1897 Manado, Dutch East Indies
- Died: 31 July 1977 (aged 80) Jakarta, Indonesia
- Party: Indonesian National Party
- Spouse: Elizabeth Marie Diena Veldhoedt
- Parent(s): Andries Alexander Maramis (father); Charlotte Ticoalu (mother)
- Relatives: Maria Walanda Maramis (aunt)
- Education: Leiden University (Mr)

Alexander Andries Maramis (20 June 1897 – 31 July 1977), more commonly known simply as A. A. Maramis, was an Indonesian politician and National Hero of Indonesia, who was involved in the struggle for independence. He was a member of the Investigating Committee for Preparatory Work for Independence (BPUPK), the organization which drafted the Constitution of Indonesia. In the early stages of the Indonesian government, following the Proclamation of Independence, he served as both Minister of Finance and Minister of Foreign Affairs. After the end of the Indonesian National Revolution, he served as the Indonesian ambassador to several nations, including the Philippines, West Germany, and the Soviet Union.

Born in Manado on 20 June 1897, he graduated from the Faculty of Law of Leiden University, Netherlands. He started his career as a lawyer in Semarang. Maramis was appointed to the Investigating Committee for Preparatory Work for Independence (BPUPK) on 1 March 1945. There, he was a part of the Panitia Sembilan (committee of nine), which would formulate the Jakarta Charter, the precursor of the Constitution of Indonesia. Maramis served in the Indonesian government throughout the Indonesian National Revolution. He served as Minister of Finance several different times. He first served from 2 September until 14 November 1945. He was reappointed on 3 July 1947 to the position, until he was shuffled to the Ministry of Foreign Affairs on 19 December 1948. He was again reappointed Minister of Finance on 13 July 1949, serving until 4 August 1949.

Following Indonesia's recognition as an independent nation, Maramis was appointed ambassador to the Philippines, serving from 1950 until 1953. He then represented Indonesia as ambassador to West Germany, from 1953 until 1956, when he was appointed ambassador to the Soviet Union, serving from 1956 until 1959. While ambassador to the Soviets, he also served as ambassador to Finland. After completing his duties as ambassador, he and his family settled in Switzerland. He returned to Indonesia in 1976. He died on 31 July 1977, at Gatot Soebroto Army Hospital, 13 months after his return to Indonesia. He lay in state in the Pancasila room at the Ministry of Foreign Affairs and was then buried in the Kalibata Heroes' Cemetery. He was posthumously given the honorary title of National Hero of Indonesia in 2019, by president Joko Widodo.

== Biography ==
=== Early life and education ===
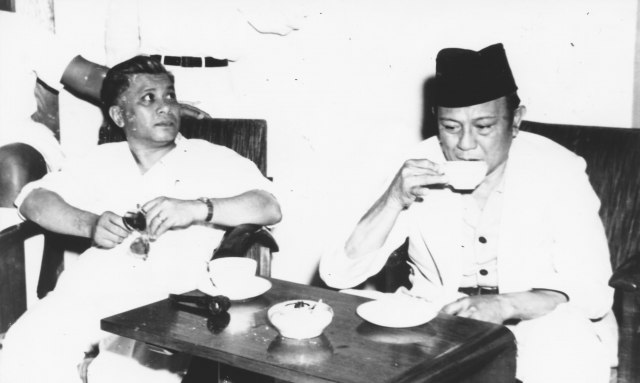
Maramis (left) with Ratulangi (right), at a conference, enjoying coffee

Alexander Andries Maramis was born in Manado on 20 June 1897 to Andries Alexander Maramis and Charlotte Ticoalu. Maramis' aunt was Maria Walanda Maramis, an Indonesian National Hero who sought to advance the circumstances of women in Indonesia at the beginning of the 20th century. Maramis attended the Europeesche Lagere School (ELS), the Dutch language elementary school in Manado. He then attended the Hogere burgerschool (HBS), the Dutch secondary school, in Batavia (now Jakarta), where he met and became friends with Arnold Mononutu (also from Minahasa) and Achmad Subardjo.

In 1919, Maramis left for the Netherlands where he studied law at Leiden University. During his time in Leiden, Maramis became involved with the Perhimpoenan Indonesia, an association for Indonesian students in the Netherlands. In 1924, he was elected as secretary of the organization. Maramis graduated with a law degree in 1924. He then returned to Indonesia and began his career as a lawyer at the district court in Semarang in 1925. A year later he moved to the district court in Palembang. During the Japanese occupation of the Dutch East Indies, he was a member of the Central Advisory Council, established by the occupation government in 1943.

=== Struggle for independence ===
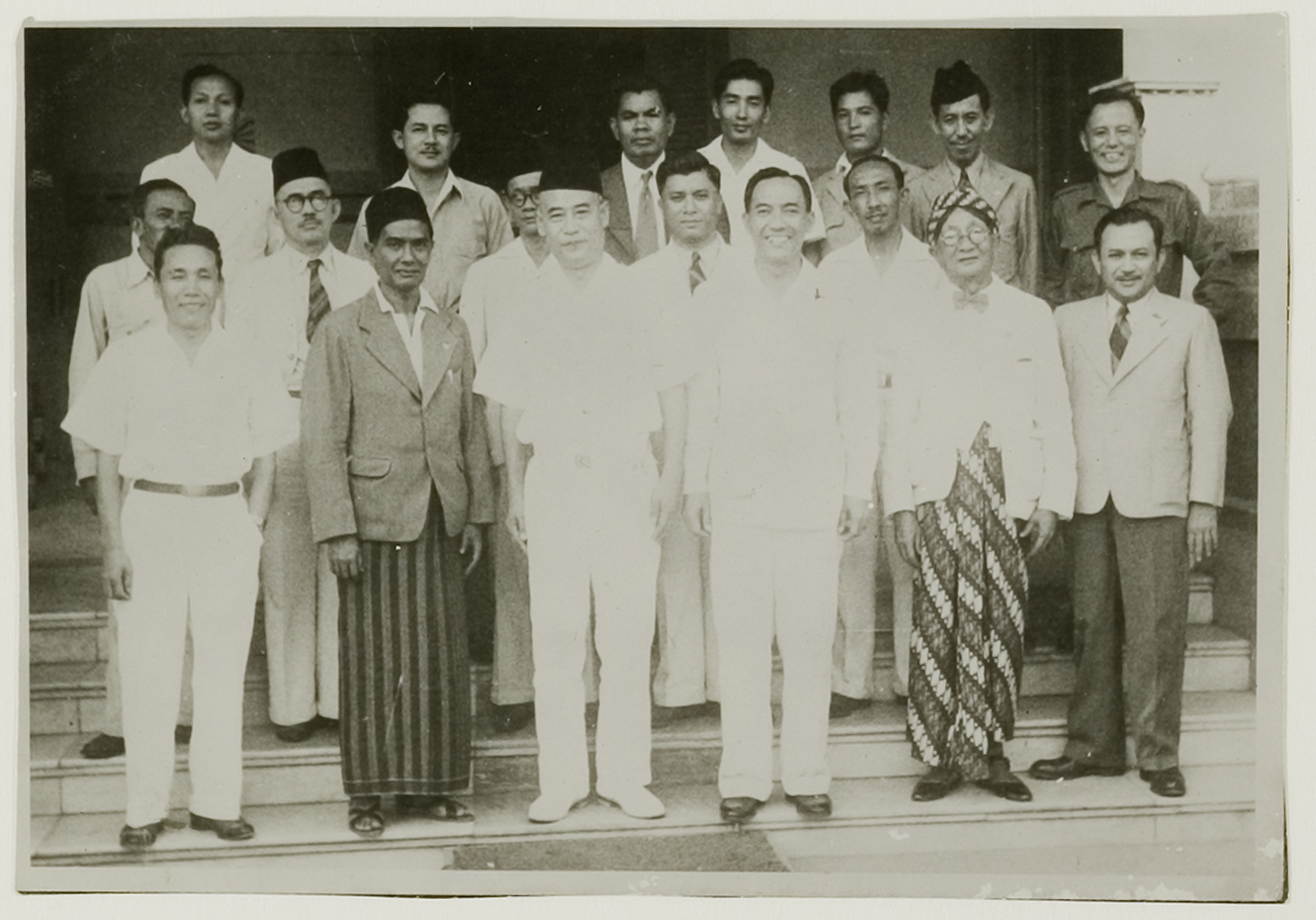
Maramis (middle) behind Sukarno

Maramis was appointed to the Investigating Committee for Preparatory Work for Independence or Badan Penyelidik Usaha Persiapan Kemerdekaan (BPUPK) which was established on 1 March 1945. Maramis was part of a working committee consisting of nine members called the Panitia Sembilan (committee of nine). This committee formulated a constitutional preamble that sought to capture the main values of the ideological principles called Pancasila that was outlined by Sukarno in his speech on 1 June 1945. The preamble was called the Jakarta Charter (Piagam Jakarta). On 11 July 1945 during one of the BPUPK plenary meetings, Maramis was appointed to a commission to edit the Constitution (Panitia Perancang Undang-Undang Dasar) before it was to be voted on by all members of the BPUPK. He would later be asked by President Suharto in 1976 to be part of a committee to provide an interpretation of Pancasila as its meaning was thought to have deviated at the time.

=== Career in government ===
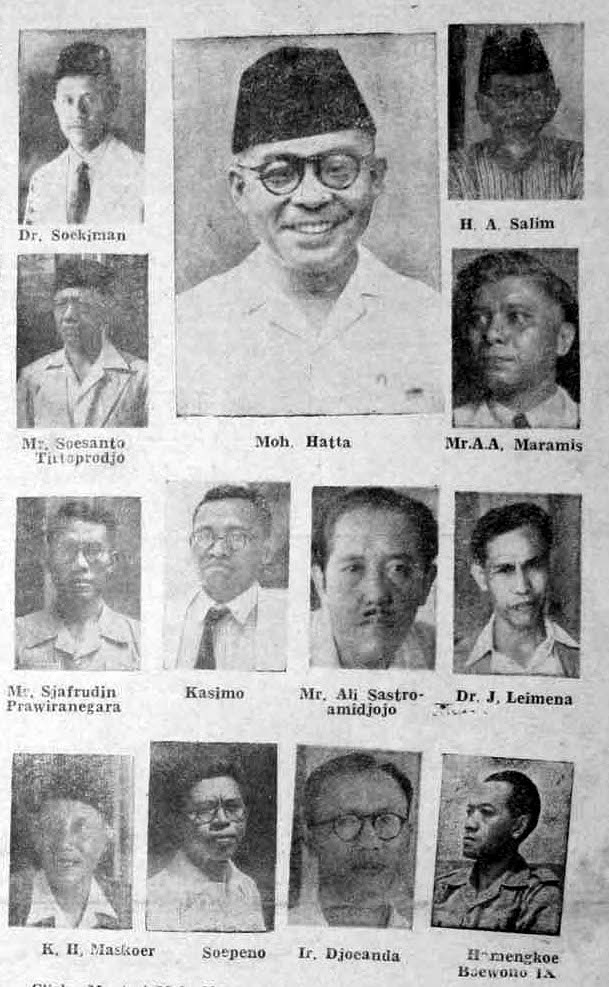
Pamphlet of Hatta I Cabinet members

Maramis was appointed as Minister of Finance in the first Indonesian cabinet called the Presidential Cabinet on 26 September 1945. He replaced Samsi Sastrawidagda who was initially given the position when the cabinet was formed on 2 September 1945. Sastrawidagda resigned from the position after just two weeks due to his chronic illness. Sastrawidagda was the first person to be appointed as the Indonesian Minister of Finance, but because of Sastrawidagda's very short time in office, Maramis could be considered the de facto first Indonesian Minister of Finance.

As Minister of Finance, Maramis was instrumental in the development and printing of the first Indonesian currency notes or Oeang Republik Indonesia (ORI). It took a year before the notes were formally issued on 30 October 1946 to replace Japanese notes and notes circulated by the Netherlands Indies Civil Administration (NICA). These notes (Series 1) were in denominations of 1, 5, and 10 sen notes, plus ½, 1, 5, 10, and 100 rupiah notes. The notes include Maramis' signature as Minister of Finance or Menteri Keuangan.

Maramis would serve again as Minister of Finance consecutively in the First Amir Sjarifuddin Cabinet on 3 July 1947, the Second Amir Sjarifuddin Cabinet on 12 November 1947, and the First Hatta Cabinet on 29 January 1948. During the Hatta administration on 19 December 1948, the Dutch started the military offensive Operation Kraai. Sukarno, Hatta, and other government officials in Yogyakarta were captured and exiled to Bangka Island. Maramis was in New Delhi, India at the time. He received a wire from Hatta before being captured with instructions to form a government-in-exile in India should Sjafruddin Prawiranegara not be able to form an emergency government in Sumatra. Prawiranegara was able to form the Emergency Government of the Republic of Indonesia and the Sjafruddin Emergency Cabinet in which Maramis was appointed as Minister of Foreign Affairs. After Sukarno and Hatta were released, Prawiranegara returned control of the country to Hatta's cabinet on 13 July 1949 and Maramis returned to his position as Minister of Finance.

=== Ambassadorships ===
Between 1950 and 1960, Maramis represented Indonesia as ambassador to four countries: Finland, the Philippines, the Soviet Union, and West Germany. Prior to these appointments on August 1, 1949, he was appointed as a Special Ambassador who was responsible for overseeing Indonesian representatives abroad. At that time, Indonesia had representative offices in Bangkok, Cairo, Canberra, Kabul, Karachi, London, Manila, New Delhi, Penang, Rangoon, Singapore, Washington, D. C., and at the United Nations (UN) office at Lake Success. Because his supervisory duties kept him abroad, he was included in the delegation of the Republic of Indonesia as an advisor to the Dutch–Indonesian Round Table Conference that took place in The Hague.

On January 25, 1950, Maramis was appointed as the Indonesian Ambassador to the Philippines. He officially started the position on February 1, 1950. Maramis served as the Indonesian ambassador in Manila for three years. On 10 April 1953, Maramis was appointed as the Indonesian Ambassador to West Germany. He officially started the position on 1 May 1953. In early 1956, Maramis returned to Jakarta and served as Head of the Asia/Pacific Directorate at the Indonesian Ministry of Foreign Affairs. He held this position for only a few months, because he was then given a new assignment as Indonesian Ambassador to the Soviet Union from 1 October 1956. Two years later, Maramis was given the dual assignment as Indonesian Ambassador to Finland, but still based in Moscow. After completing his service as ambassador to the Soviet Union and Finland, Maramis and his family settled in Switzerland. When he was about to return to Indonesia in 1976, he was living in Lugano.

=== Death and legacy ===
After almost 20 years living outside of Indonesia, Maramis expressed the desire to return to Indonesia. The Indonesian government arranged for his return and on 27 June 1976 he arrived in Jakarta. Among the greeters at the airport were his old friends Achmad Subardjo and Arnold Mononutu, and also Rachmi Hatta (the wife of Mohammad Hatta). In May 1977, he was hospitalized after suffering a cerebral hemorrhage. Maramis died on 31 July 1977 at Gatot Soebroto Army Hospital, just 13 months after returning to Indonesia. He lay in state in the Pancasila room at the Ministry of Foreign Affairs and was then buried in the Kalibata Heroes' Cemetery.

== Awards and honors ==
=== Awards ===
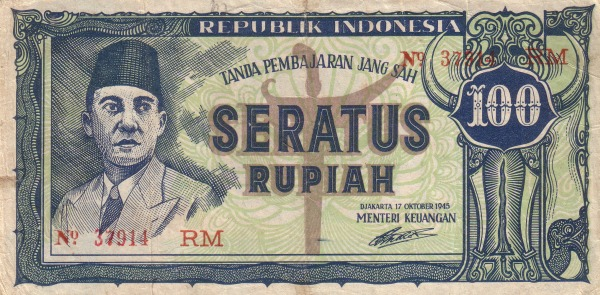
A 100 Rupiah note with Maramis' signature on it

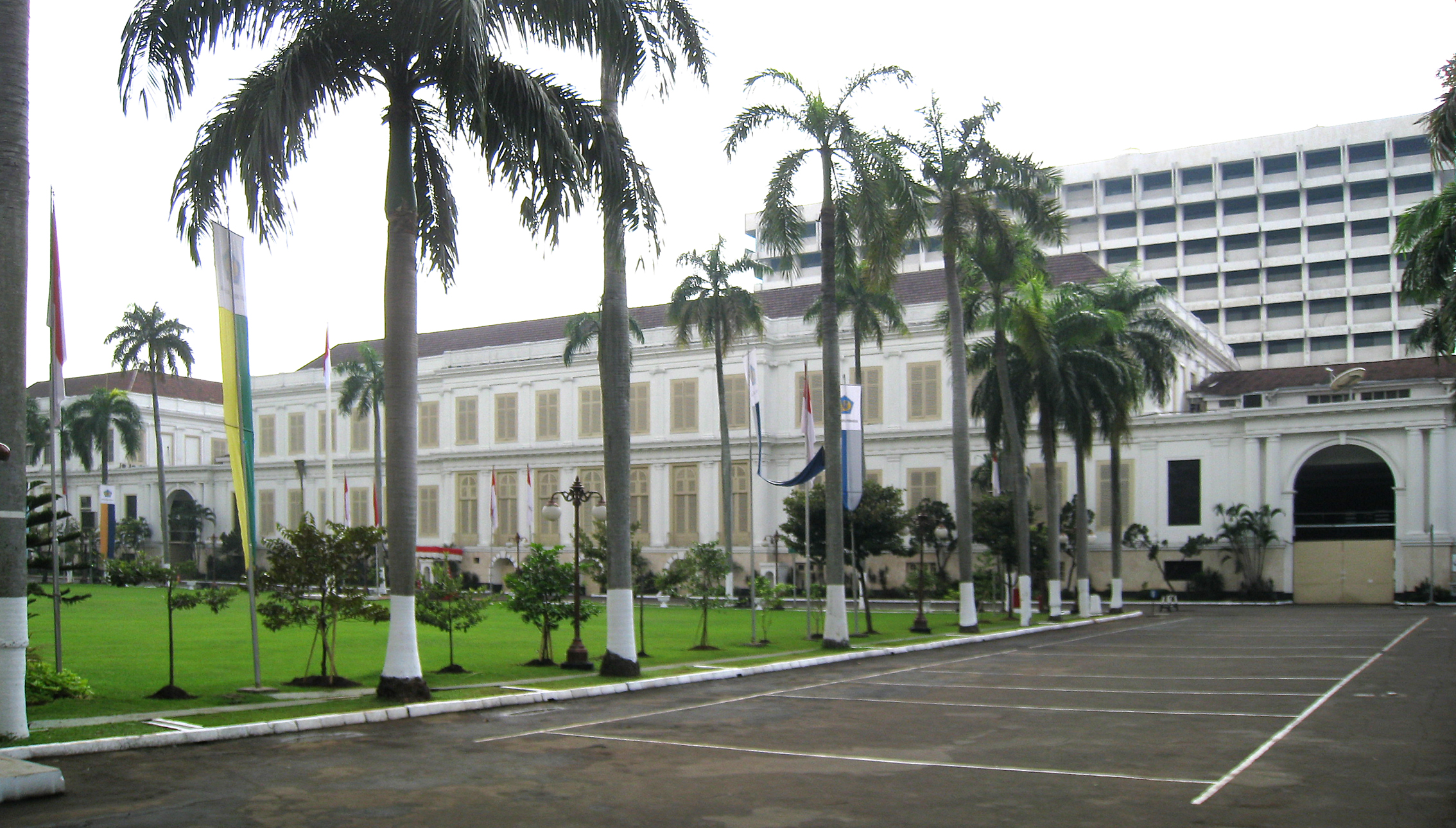
The headquarters of the Indonesian Ministry of Finance is named after Maramis

- On 15 February 1961 Maramis received the Bintang Mahaputra Utama and on 5 October 1963 he received the Bintang Gerilya. Maramis was posthumously awarded the Star of the Republic of Indonesia or Bintang Republik Indonesia Utama on 12 August 1992.

=== Honors ===
- On 30 October 2007, Maramis was recognized by the Indonesian World Records Museum as the Minister of Finance whose signature is on the most number of Indonesian notes or Oeang Republik Indonesia (ORI). Between 1945 and 1947, his signature was on 15 different notes.
- The headquarters of the Indonesian Ministry of Finance is named the A.A. Maramis building.
- On 8 November 2019, Alexander Andries Maramis was posthumously conferred the honorary title of National Hero of Indonesia by President Joko Widodo in a ceremony at the State Palace. Joan Maramis, the granddaughter of A. A. Maramis, represented the Maramis family at the ceremony.

== Personal life ==
Maramis was married to Elizabeth Marie Diena Veldhoedt, the daughter of a Dutch father and Balinese mother. They did not have any children, but Elizabeth had a son from a prior marriage whom Maramis accepted and gave the name Lexy Maramis. Maramis' father, Andries Alexander Maramis (the given names are swapped), was the older brother of Maria Walanda Maramis, another Indonesian National Hero who sought to advance the circumstances of women in Indonesia at the beginning of the 20th century.

== See also ==
- Maria Walanda Maramis, his aunt.
