= Agus Widjojo =

Indonesian military officer and diplomat (1947–2026)

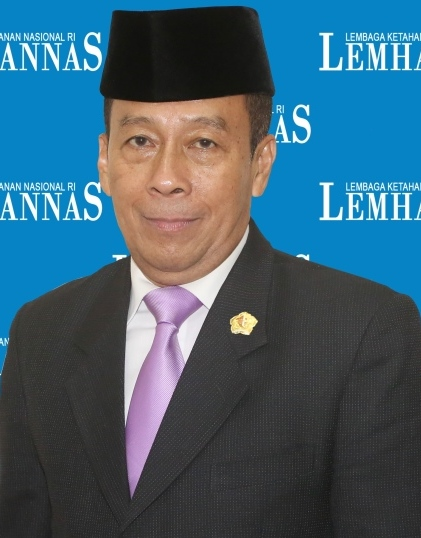

Ambassador of Indonesia to the Philippines
- In office 12 January 2022 – 8 February 2026
- President: Joko Widodo; Prabowo Subianto
- Preceded by: Sinyo Harry Sarundajang

Governor of National Resilience Institute
- In office 15 April 2016 – 12 January 2022
- Preceded by: Budi Susilo Soepandji
- Succeeded by: Andi Widjajanto

Deputy Speaker of People's Consultative Assembly Faction military/police
- In office 29 October 2001 – 7 November 2002 Serving with Period 1999–2004: Ginandjar Kartasasmita; Husnie Thamrin; Jusuf Amir Feisal; Soetjipto Soedjono; Cholil Bisri (2002–2004); Nazri Adlani; Oesman Sapta Odang
- President: Megawati Soekarnoputri
- Speaker: Amien Rais
- Preceded by: Hari Sabarno
- Succeeded by: Slamet Supriyadi

Personal details
- Born: 8 June 1947 Surakarta, Central Java, Indonesia
- Died: 8 February 2026 (aged 78) Jakarta, Indonesia
- Parent: Sutoyo Siswomiharjo (father)
- Education: AKABRI (1970)
- Occupation: Military officer, diplomat

Military service
- Allegiance: Indonesia
- Branch/service: Indonesian Army
- Years of service: 1970–2003
- Rank: Lieutenant General
- Unit: Infantry
- Battles/wars: Operation Lotus; Papua Conflict

Agus Widjojo (8 June 1947 – 8 February 2026) was an Indonesian military officer and diplomat who was the vice chairman of the People’s Consultative Assembly of the Republic of Indonesia and Indonesian National Armed Forces (TNI) Chief of Territorial Affairs, and was regarded as one of the TNI's leading intellectuals.

== Career ==
During his appointment as commandant of the Armed Forces' staff college and Chief of territorial staff the TNI think tank, he was responsible for restructuring the political and security doctrine of the TNI. General Agus Widjojo once served as governor of the Indonesian National Resilience Institute and member of the Indonesia-Timor Leste Commission of Truth and Friendship. He was a senior fellow of the Centre for Strategic and International Studies, Indonesia, and was a visiting senior fellow of the Institute of Defence and Strategic Studies in Singapore. Gen. Widjojo was also an advisor on the board of the Institute for Peace and Democracy (IPD), Udayana university, Bali. IPD is the implementing authority of the Bali Democracy Forum. Gen. Widjojo has written numerous articles on security issues in the Asia-Pacific Region..

== Death ==
Widjojo died in Gatot Soebroto Army Hospital on 8 February 2026, at the age of 76.
