= List of Minahasa people =

This is a list of notable Minahasa people.

== Academicians and Educators ==
- Arie Frederik Lasut, Indonesian national hero, co-founder of Indonesia's first Mining and Geological Service
- Frits Bernhard Mewengkang, academic and bureaucrat, dean of the University of Indonesia's engineering faculty from 1977 until 1982
- Marie Thomas, first Indonesian female physician, first Indonesian specialist in obstetrics and gynaecology
- W. A. F. J. Tumbelaka, physician, academician, and former acting rector of the University of Indonesia from 1985 until 1986
- Anna Adeline Warouw, second Indonesian female physician, specialist in otorhinolaryngology

== Activism ==
- Rocky Gerung, political commentator, philosopher, academic and public intellectual
- Maria Walanda Maramis, Indonesian national hero, pioneer of women's rights in Indonesia
- Zus Ratulangi, psychiatrist, pediatrician, politician, and independence activist. Daughter of Sam Ratulangi
- Dora Marie Sigar, nurse, activist, and homemaker. Mother of Prabowo Subianto
- Johanna Tumbuan, pioneering figure in Indonesian independence, lecturer at the University of Indonesia

== Athletes ==
- Benny Dollo, football coach
- Mees Hilgers, footballer
- Gerald Item, swimmer
- Jones Ralfy Jansen, badminton player
- Lany Kaligis, tennis player
- Winny Oktavina Kandow, badminton player
- Mahadirga Lasut, footballer
- Flandy Limpele, badminton player, bronze medalist at the 2004 Summer Olympics in Athens, Greece
- Deyana Lomban, badminton player
- Fernando Lumain, sprinter
- Septi Mende, tennis player
- Erents Alberth Mangindaan, football manager
- Ferry Moniaga, boxer
- Liliyana Natsir, badminton player, gold medalist at the 2016 Summer Olympics in Rio, Brazil
- Michael Orah, footballer
- Gianluca Pandeynuwu, footballer
- Jendri Pitoy, footballer
- Greysia Polii, badminton player, gold medalist at the 2020 Summer Olympics in Tokyo, Japan
- Natalia Christine Poluakan, badminton player
- Lius Pongoh, badminton player and coach
- Yeremia Rambitan, badminton player
- Fictor Gideon Roring, basketball coach
- Jessy Rompies, tennis player
- Ferry Rotinsulu, footballer
- Ikhsan Rumbay, badminton player
- Christopher Rungkat, tennis player
- Eksel Runtukahu, footballer
- Michael Soeoth, footballer
- Youbel Sondakh basketball player
- Delton Stevano, footballer
- Zachariah Josiahno Sumanti, badminton player
- Adrianus Taroreh, boxer
- Ezra Walian, footballer
- Donald Wailan-Walalangi, tennis player
- Daniel Wenas, basketball player
- Max Arie Wotulo, chess player

== Attorneys ==
- Sunaryati Hartono, attorney, lawyer, professor of law and government official
- O. C. Kaligis, lawyer
- Ani Abbas Manopo, first Indonesian female lawyer
- Jan Samuel Maringka, prosecutor

== Authors ==
- F. D. J. Pangemanan, author of Tjerita Si Tjonat

== Businesspeople ==
- Hashim Djojohadikusumo, entrepreneur and politician
- Peter F. Gontha, Indonesian commercial television pioneer, founder of RCTI
- Reyn Altin Johannes Lumenta, former president and CEO of Garuda Indonesia
- Gita Wirjawan, entrepreneur, ex-investment banker, music and film producer, podcaster, and former minister of trade

== Entertainers ==
- Shandy Aulia, actress
- Kristania Virginia Besouw, Miss Indonesia 2006
- Rich Brian, rapper
- Adinda Cresheilla, Puteri Indonesia Pariwisata 2022, 3rd runner-up Miss Supranational 2022
- Anneth Delliecia (Kalengkongan), singer and songwriter
- Julie Estelle, actress and model
- Audy Item, pop and rock singer
- Christy Jusung,
- Lydia Kandou, actress
- Davina Karamoy, actress and singer
- Angel Karamoy, pop singer and actress
- Monica Khonado, tv host and model
- Annie Landouw, singer and actress
- Ari Lasso, singer
- Marcellino Lefrandt, actor and lecturer
- Pinkan Mambo, pop and R&B singer
- Dougy Mandagi, singer, vocalist of The Temper Trap
- Mimi Mariani, actress, model, and singer
- Once Mekel, singer
- Rima Melati, actress
- Maria Menado, Malaysian actress
- Naysila Mirdad, actress
- Niki, singer
- Alice Norin, model and actress
- Vina Panduwinata, singer and actress
- Randy Pangalila, actor and singer
- Pance Pondaag, singer and songwriter
- Mona Ratuliu, actress and presenter
- Pierre Roland, actor
- Jolene Marie Rotinsulu, Puteri Indonesia Lingkungan 2019
- Safira Rumimper, model and beauty pageant titleholder
- Paula Rumokoy, actress, model, and dancer
- Januarisman Runtuwene, musician and singer-songwriter, Indonesian Idol (season 5) winner
- Ririn Setyarini, actress and politician
- Alyssa Soebandono, actress, model and singer
- James F. Sundah, songwriter
- Suzzanna, actress
- Remy Sylado, author, actor, and musician
- Mikha Tambayong, actress
- Nagita Slavina Tengker, actress
- Frans Tumbuan, actor
- Kezia Warouw, Puteri Indonesia 2016, Miss Universe 2016 top 13 semifinalist
- Stefan William, actor and singer (half-American)
- Brando Windah, YouTuber
- Rudy Wowor, dancer and actor

== Filmmakers ==
- Angga Dwimas Sasongko, film director
- Monty Tiwa, film director
- Sabrina Rochelle Kalangie, film director
- Wim Umboh, film director

== Journalism ==
- Alex Mendur, co-founder of the Indonesian Press Photo Service (IPPHOS), photographer of iconic photo of Bung Tomo
- Frans Mendur, co-founder of the Indonesian Press Photo Service (IPPHOS), photographer of Sukarno proclaiming the independence of Indonesia]

== Military ==
- Alexander Evert Kawilarang, commander of the Siliwangi Division
- Willy Ghayus Alexander Lasut, governor of North Sulawesi
- Adolf Gustaaf Lembong, commander of 16th Division
- Jeanne Mandagi, first Indonesian woman to become a general in the Indonesian National Police
- Gustaf Hendrik Mantik, commander of Kodam IX/Mulawarman and Kodam Jaya, governor of North Sulawesi
- Elias Daniel (Daan) Mogot, first director of the Tangerang Military Academy
- Robert Wolter Mongisidi, Indonesian national hero
- Herman Nicolas Ventje Sumual, leader of Permesta movement
- Pierre Andries Tendean, Indonesian revolutionary hero
- Frits Johanes (Broer) Tumbelaka, first governor of North Sulawesi, brokered peace between the Indonesian government and the Permesta movement
- Jacob Frederick (Joop) Warouw, commander of TT-VII/Indonesia Timur, leader of Permesta movement

== Politics ==
- Freddy Jaques Inkiriwang, Indonesian industrial affairs minister
- Herling Laoh, Indonesian public works and transportation minister
- Bernard Wilhelm Lapian, Indonesian national hero, church leader, second governor of Sulawesi
- Gustaaf Adolf Maengkom, Indonesian justice minister
- Alexander Andries Maramis, Indonesian national hero, Indonesian finance minister
- Arnold Isaac Zacharias Mononutu, Indonesian information minister, first ambassador of Indonesia to China, rector of Hasanuddin University
- Henk Ngantung, former Governor of Jakarta
- Lambertus Nicodemus Palar, Indonesian national hero, first Indonesian representative to the United Nations
- G. R. Pantouw, minister of social affairs and minister of information in 1947
- Gerungan Saul Samuel Jacob (Sam) Ratulangi, Indonesian national hero, member of the Preparatory Committee for Indonesian Independence, first governor of Sulawesi
- Sinyo Harry Sarundajang, politician and diplomat
- Yulius Selvanus, politician and former military officer
- Prabowo Subianto, 8th President of Indonesia
- Antoinette Waroh, politician
- Semuel Jusof Warouw, physician, politician, and minister of health from 1947 to 1949
- Augustine Magdalena Waworuntu, first post-federal Indonesian mayor of Manado and the first female mayor of Manado

== Religious leaders ==
- Yaakov Baruch, rabbi of the Sha'ar Hashamayim Synagogue
- Marianne Katoppo, novelist and theologian
- Gilbert Lumoindong, Indonesian Christian clergy
- Peter Turang, prelate of the Roman Catholic Church
- Rolly Untu, Roman Catholic bishop
- Muhammad Yahya Waloni, Islamic preacher
