= Lasut =

Lasut is a Minahasan surname. Notable people with the surname include:

- Arie Frederik Lasut (1918-1949), Indonesian national hero
- Mahadirga Lasut (born 1988), Indonesian professional footballer
- Willy Lasut (1926-2003), Indonesian military officer and politician
