= Mendur =

Mendur is a Minahasan surname. Notable people with the surname include:

- Alex Mendur (1907-1984), Indonesian journalistic photographer
- Frans Mendur (1913–1971), Indonesian journalistic photographer
