= Mandagi =

Mandagi is an Indonesian surname of the Minahasa people that originally comes from North Sulawesi. Notable people with the surname include:

- Geri Mandagi (born 1988), Indonesian football goalkeeper
- Jeanne Mandagi (1937–2017), Indonesian police brigadier general
- Marchelino Mandagi (born 1990), Indonesian football player
