= Tumbelaka =

Tumbelaka is a surname. Notable people with the surname include:

- F. J. Tumbelaka (1921–1983), Indonesian politician
- W. A. F. J. Tumbelaka (1920–2012), Indonesian physician
