= A. A. Baramuli =

Indonesian prosecutor, politician and businessman

Achmad Arnold Baramuli
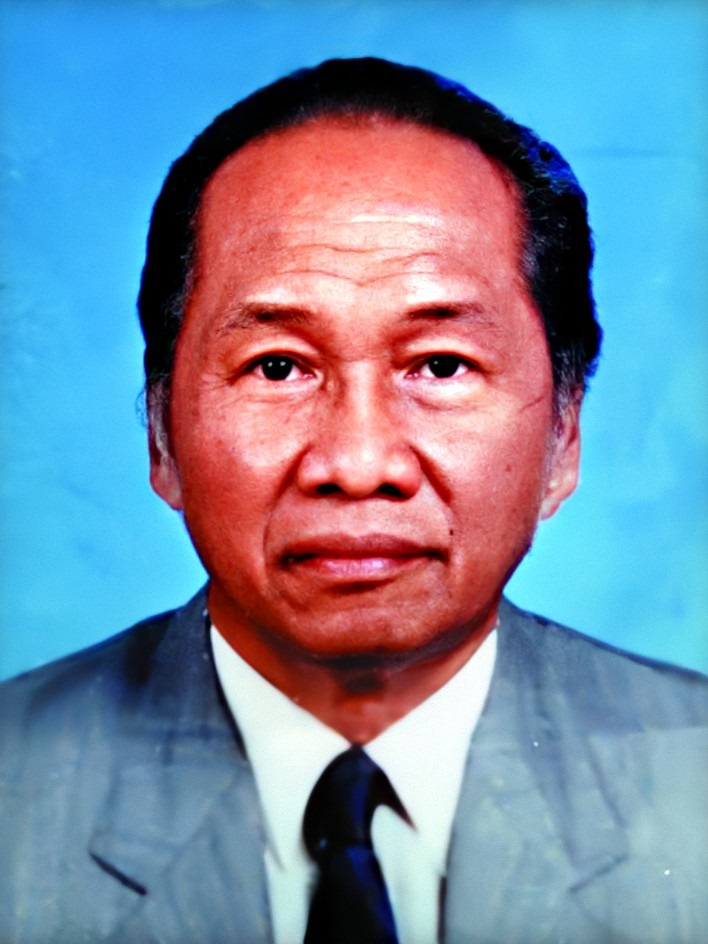

10th Head of the Supreme Advisory Council
- In office 1998–1999
- President: B.J. Habibie
- Preceded by: Sudomo
- Succeeded by: Achmad Tirtosudiro

1st Governor of North and Central Sulawesi
- In office 23 March 1960 – 15 July 1962
- Succeeded by: F. J. Tumbelaka

Personal details
- Born: 20 July 1930 Pinrang, Sulawesi, Dutch East Indies
- Died: 11 October 2006 (aged 76) Jakarta, Indonesia
- Party: Golkar Party

Achmad Arnold Baramuli (20 July 1930 – 11 October 2006) was an Indonesian prosecutor, politician and businessman. His highest position was chairman of the Supreme Advisory Council over 1998 to 1999 under President B.J. Habibie. A key vote-winner for Golkar Party, Baramuli was involved in the 1999 Bank Bali scandal that contributed to Habibie's failure to win re-election.

== Early life, religion and education ==
Arnold Baramuli was born on 20 July 1930 in Pinrang, a traditional trading area in southern Sulawesi in the Dutch East Indies. He was one of six children born to Julius Baramuli, a Protestant from Manado, and Adolfina La Roempoeh (familiarly known as Ibu Pole), a Muslim woman of Bugis ethnicity. Her nickname 'Pole' means 'welcome' in the Bugis language. The Baramuli family's Poleko group of trading and manufacturing companies was named after Ibu Pole. Baramuli had five siblings: Annie, Eddy, Hengki, Mariyani, and Rita Arifien.

Baramuli was raised as a Christian, but later converted to Islam in what his critics viewed as an attempt to improve his political career in Jakarta. In June 1988, at age 57, Baramuli announced he had converted to Islam and augmented his name to Achmad Arnold Baramuli (although he was thereafter more commonly called Arnold Achmad Baramuli or simply A.A. Baramuli). “Now the foundation of my life is Islam. The development of my life is Islamic and the purpose of my life is Islam,” he said. His wife remained a Protestant, as did two of their children, while three of their children followed Islam.

Baramuli completed elementary school in Pinrang in 1945, the year that Indonesia proclaimed its independence. He then attended Meer Uitgebreid Lager Onderwijs (Mulo) in Makassar until 1948, before completing his schooling at Bestuur School, also in Makassar, in 1950.

In 1955, he graduated in law at the University of Indonesia, where he was a student activist. As a member of Djakarta Student Council, his contemporaries included Benjamin Mangkudilaga (a future Supreme Court justice), Ismail Suny (a future constitutional law professor) and Adnan Buyung Nasution (a future human rights lawyer).

Baramuli completed an Intelligence Course in Singapore in 1957. He later studied at Indonesia's National Resilience Institute from 1981 to 1982.

== Civil service career ==
In 1954, Baramuli began his career as a state prosecutor at Jakarta District Attorney's Office, where he served for two years. In 1956, he was appointed chief of the Makassar Attorney's Office in South Sulawesi. He was later promoted to the Supervisory Board of the Sulawesi High Prosecutor's Office and concurrently served as a Military High Prosecutor for Eastern Indonesia with the rank of lieutenant colonel.

In Makassar, he investigated cases of alleged smuggling by “non-indigenous” entrepreneurs, who parked wealth abroad in Singapore and Hong Kong. Baramuli's team of investigators included Baharuddin Lopa, a future attorney general.

On 23 March 1960, when 29 years old, Baramuli was appointed governor of North-Central Sulawesi province (later split into two separate provinces), making him the youngest governor in Indonesia. His appointment required a decree from founding president Sukarno, as the minimum age for a governor at that time was 30 years old. He served in the position until 15 July 1962.

The position gave him many business opportunities, but he later recounted he had to develop the new province with little budgetary assistance from the central government, and he found it challenging to provide monthly salaries for civil servants. He also had to contend with the Permesta rebellion led by Ventje Sumual. In Manado, Baramuli pioneered the provision of housing at Bumi Beringin for employees of the governor's office.

During the final years of the Sukarno regime, Baramuli served as an advisor to the minister of home affairs from 1963 to 1965.

In 1965, when General Sumarno became home affairs minister, Baramuli was made head of the Board of Control of Regional Enterprises (Bappeda). The board had been formed in 1958 to take control of many regionally based Dutch enterprises, which had been nationalized. The Bappeda companies were operated by provincial governors, usually military officers. The appointment of Baramuli to the helm of Bappeda led to him being viewed as a “financial general”.

After Amirmachmud became Minister of Home Affairs in 1969, Baramuli was brought to Jakarta as an expert staff in charge of state assets in the region. In the early years of the Suharto regime, Baramuli served as head of the Home Affairs Ministry's economy and finance team from 1970 to 1973. He was then deputy chairman of the ministry's Economic, Finance and Development Council from 1973 to 1974. He was appointed deputy chairman of the Indonesia-Japan Committee in 1974.

In the mid-1970s, Baramuli resigned from the civil service to focus on his family's Poleko Group consortium.

== Political career ==
Baramuli was a member of Golkar's Development Faction in parliament for four terms from 1972 to 1997. From October 1997 to 2004, he was a member of the People's Consultative Assembly (MPR), representing South Sulawesi.

He was a co-founder and deputy chairperson of Golkar's Board of Trustees.

=== Exposure of Eddy Tansil loan scam ===
In February 1994, as a member of the national parliament's Commission VII, Baramuli exposed a banking fraud scandal involving tycoon Eddy Tansil. At a hearing between Commission VII and Bank Indonesia governor Sudrajad Djiwandono, Baramuli raised questions over Tansil's bad loans with state-owned Indonesian Development Bank (Bapindo). He said the loan procedure was flawed as Tansil had not put up any collateral. Tansil, assisted by his business partner Tommy Suharto, had obtained loans totaling $430 million from Bapindo for his Golden Key company to develop petrochemical plants, but the plants were never built and the loans not repaid. Tansil was in August 1994 sentenced to 17 years in jail but in 1996 bribed his way out of prison and left Indonesia.

=== DPA head and Habibie's ‘chief-of-staff’ ===
Baramuli was close to B.J. Habibie as they shared ethnic and political interests. When Suharto resigned on 21 May 1998, Habibie became president and Baramuli was appointed head of the Supreme Advisory Council (DPA). In this position, he was described as Habibie's de facto chief-of-staff. He was accused of using 'money politics' to support Golkar and Habibie's re-election campaigns.

He led the DPA until 20 October 1999, when Habibie lost the presidency. As leader of DPA, Baramuli reportedly rejected his salary and state facilities, such as a car and housing. When he traveled to Singapore for medical treatment, he declined an offer of state facilities, saying he did not want to burden the country.

=== Ghalibgate phone leak ===
In March 1999, a telephone conversation between Habibie and Attorney General Andi Ghalib was leaked to the press. Habibie instructed Ghalib to go easy on Suharto, who was being investigated for corruption. Baramuli declared the leak was an intelligence game and psychological operation planned by the military – at that time led by General Wiranto. Baramuli implied that Major General Syamsu Djalaluddin, who was the attorney general's aide for intelligence, had leaked the telephone conversation on behalf of the military's Strategic Intelligence Agency (BAIS). Habibie therefore removed Syamsu from his position.

=== Irian Jaya ===
In January 1999, a drunk man in Yapen Waropen regency of Irian Jaya allegedly struck at a member of the Indonesian Armed Forces (ABRI). The soldier and his colleagues responded by assaulting residents of the man's house. Baramuli reacted by saying the government should impose capital punishment on provocateurs of acts of violence. After a delegation of Papuans met with Habibie on 26 February 1999 and requested independence from Indonesia, Baramuli became a strong proponent of a proposal to split Irian Jaya into separate provinces.

=== Vote buying allegations and 1999 elections ===
In the run-up to Indonesia's June 1999 general election – the first free, multi-party general election after the 32-year Suharto regime – Baramuli in late January 1999 began traveling throughout regions, especially in Sulawesi, to distribute money and gifts, as Golkar sought to remain in power.

Tempo described Baramuli as “Santa Claus” for handing out money and vehicles on a "Golkar cadre coordination visit" to Eastern Indonesia that included Biak (Irian Jaya), Ambon and Ternate (Maluku), East Kalimantan and South Kalimantan. He denied it was part of the election campaign, saying Golkar only fought for the state ideology Pancasila and defended religion.

Baramuli donated Rp100,000 ($11.10) each to village heads in Minahasa district, North Sulawesi, and in Gowa district in South Sulawesi. The head of Pasaman Baru village admitted he and his colleagues had each received Rp100,000 from Golkar.

In Gowa, Baramuli distributed Rp206 million to mosque caretakers and provided funds to Golkar representatives at the village and district levels. He also awarded scholarships to local high school and university students. Gatra magazine reported that Baramuli handed out checks and urged people to vote for Golkar. Baramuli said the money was from donations from friends of Golkar and not corruption money.

Leaders of 21 rival political parties on 11 June 1999 demanded that Baramuli be brought to court on charges of vote buying and corruption. They claimed that his presentation of “billions of rupiah” for the construction of places of worship in the name of Golkar was tantamount to bribery and money politics. Baramuli acknowledged the amounts he handed out in Sulawesi could reach Rp2 billion, but he said the funds were for the people and not for Golkar.

In reports published in June and July 1999, Tempo magazine accused Baramuli of practicing “money politics” for Golkar in North Sulawesi. The reports cited evidence that implicated Golkar and Baramuli's company, Poleko, in efforts to use money to win votes. The Central Election Supervising Committee (Panwaspus) wanted Baramuli tried for alleged vote buying, but as head of the DPA he was not brought to trial.

Baramuli was involved in the 1999 Bank Bali scandal, in which Rp564 billion from a state repayment of interbank loans was funneled to Golkar figures and cronies, ahead of efforts to persuade Golkar's provincial chapter leaders to endorse Habibie as the party's presidential candidate. Baramuli dismissed the allegations as "only nonsense" and accused the banker at the center of the scandal of being a liar and a drug addict.

Indonesian Bank Restructuring Agency (IBRA) chairman Glenn Yusuf on 13 September 1999 testified before parliament that Baramuli had pressured him to assist in a cover-up of the Bank Bali scandal, warning him that “if you don't ... I could become involved and the president could be dragged in.”

As the scandal unfolded, Habibie rejected calls to suspend Baramuli from the DPA, even though parliament concluded Baramuli was clearly involved in Baligate. Student protesters demanded Habibie resign and also said Baramuli should step down from his position as Golkar's South Sulawesi representative in the MPR. Baramuli responded by commenting, “To withdraw is not constitutional, if I am Habibie, if I were, I was, I will not resign because I represent the people, I'm not a coward, I'm a fighter, he is also a fighter, all right?”

In 1999, Golkar was riven by factional feuding over Habibie's effort to seek a second presidential term. Baramuli formed and chaired the Irama Suka Nusantara (Outer Islanders) group of Golkar officials who campaigned for Habibie to be re-elected by the MPR in October 1999. Baramuli accused Golkar chairman Akbar Tanjung and parliamentary faction chief Marzuki Darusman of betraying a Golkar mandate because they did not seriously support the president. He sought to hold a special congress to remove Marzuki, who was suspected of being a source of the Bank Bali scandal leaks.

Habibie delivered his accountability speech to the MPR on 14 October 1999. The speech was put to a vote on 19 October with Baramuli's group trying to convince the majority of MPR members to endorse the speech. It was rejected by 355 to 322 votes.

While Baramuli headed Golkar's pro-Habibie faction, Akbar Tanjung's anti-Habibie faction in Golkar ended up supporting the presidential candidacy of opposition figurehead Megawati Sukarnoputri. After Habibie withdrew from the race following the MPR's rejection of his accountability speech, Baramuli threw his weight behind Abdurrahman ‘Gus Dur’ Wahid, providing about 100 votes, in return for which he wanted representation for his faction in the new cabinet. Wahid was elected president and Baramuli was spared from being tried over the Bank Bali scandal. During the Wahid presidency, Baramuli was named a suspect in the case but the Attorney General's Office refused to put him on trial. Attorney General's Office spokesman Antasari Azhar in 2003 claimed a lack of evidence prevented Baramuli and three others (Tanri Abeng, Erman Munzir and Setya Novanto) from being brought to trial. He further said that even if Baramuli were tried, there would be little chance of him being convicted because other major players had already been exonerated. Therefore, the Attorney General's Office terminated its investigation into Baramuli.

== Business career ==
The Poleko Trading Company was established by Baramuli's family in South Sulawesi in 1954. The family remained the most prolific shareholder when PT Poleko was established in 1958. Until the late 1960s, the Poleko group was a small outer-islands trader. It was mainly an agribusiness firm, focused on rice, cooking oil and coconut flour milling.

In 1973, Baramuli decided to expand Poleko, moving its main office from Ujung Pandang to Jakarta. The group expanded rapidly and became associated with the Home Affairs Ministry. A recapitalization program involved the injection of Rp500 million into Poleko and Rp2108 million into Poleko Solindo, a sack and bag factory. Ventures included synthetic cotton, timber (on Buru island, with Filipino experts and a loan from Japan's Marubeni conglomerate), plywood, glue for wood and paper (in Surabaya), garments (in Bekasi), rattan, furniture, shrimps, cold storage, and a cocoa nut mill. Poleko also entered large-scale joint ventures with Japanese companies: 51% of PT Pacific Textiles, 16% of PT Indonesia Toray Synthetics, and 40% of a joint venture in chemicals.

Poleko grew to have over 8,300 workers across 14 companies, including eight joint ventures with Japanese, British and Australian partners. The group had 12 industrial plants, including polyester, chemicals and iron. In the field of agribusiness, the group had coconut flour milling factories, sugar factories and shrimp breeding. Most of the businesses were based in Sulawesi.

Baramuli was president commissioner of Poleko Group and owned 20% of Poleko's total investment value, equivalent to about $200 million. He said he did not use state facilities in running his businesses. He said he sought little personal profit and instead reinvested accumulated capital to create new jobs. He once revealed that his group paid tax of Rp 8 billion a year.

His business interests included a cement factory near Kupang in West Timor. His son co-owned a controversial alcohol sticker company run by Suharto's grandson, Ari Haryo Wibowo.

Baramuli was a deputy chairman of the Chamber of Commerce and Industry (KADIN) from 1982 to 1994. He chaired the KADIN Advisory Council from 1994 to 1999.

=== Indover Bank bad loan ===
In early 2000, Indonesian auditors found that from 1993 to 1998, about $1 billion in funds from Bank Indonesia, the central bank, had gone to an affiliate in the Netherlands, Indover Bank in Amsterdam. The Attorney General's Office suspected the money had been funneled via Indover Bank to Suharto's relatives and cronies. One of the recipients was identified as Baramuli's company PT United Coconut Indonesia (Unicotin), which defaulted on a loan of $1.5 million.

In January 2001, the Attorney General's Office questioned Baramuli over the non-performing loan. Baramuli, who owned about 70% of Unicotin's shares, said he had personally guaranteed the loan. He said the loan, made in 1995, was meant for Unicotin's expansion in the agro-business industry, but the company collapsed because of the 1997 Asian financial crisis. Baramuli told reporters he was prepared to take personal responsibility if his company was unable to repay the debt. "My assets are 10 times what this non-performing loan is worth," he said. He denied the loan was given because of his closeness to Soedrajad Djiwandono, the governor of Bank Indonesia at the time.

== Human rights commissioner ==
From 1993 to 1998, Baramuli was an inaugural member of the National Commission on Human Rights (Komnas HAM).

Baramuli led Komnas HAM's delegation that in January 1994 investigated rights abuses in protests against the Nirwana Resort development at Tanah Lot in Bali's Tabanan regency. The project on 121 hectares of land was a joint venture between Aburizal Bakrie's Bakrie Group, Indonesia's largest indigenous conglomerate, and UK-based Timeswitch Investments Ltd. Like Baramuli, Bakrie was a member of both Golkar and KADIN. Farmers in the project area had been requested to sell their land "in the national interest" for what they were told was a government project. When the true ownership of the development was revealed, Balinese locals protested, saying they did not want commercial developments near significant Hindu temple sites. The local government responded by threatening to cut off irrigation water to reduce the value of the land. The project then stalled for eight months until the military intervened and student protesters were injured when police used force to break up a rally. The military claimed the protesters were inspired by the long-banned Indonesian Communist Party (PKI). With Baramuli heading the investigation team, Komnas HAM concluded the only violation of rights was the loss of work to laborers due to the delay to the project. Komnas HAM also urged the Bali Regional Environmental Impact Assessment Commission to immediately resolve an Environmental Impact Assessment previously rejected by the community.

== Family and tennis ==
Barmauli married Albertina Kaunang, the only daughter of the head of Manado District Court and the granddaughter of former judge and Volksraad member Leonard Dengah. Albertina and Baramuli (who was familiarly known as 'Bung' Naldi) met in 1951 while studying law at the University of Indonesia and two years later decided to get married. She later lectured in law at the University of Indonesia, Pancasila University, Atma Jaya University, and Indonesian Christian University. She and Baramuli were both were keen readers, tennis players and yoga practitioners. They had six children: boys Arly, Ardy (deceased) and Amir (also spelled Emir), and daughters Arnina, Resty Sulinda, and Aryanthi.

In his later years, Baramuli was a member of the Baramu (Barisan Awet Muda - Youthful Front) tennis club, whose members played with national tennis champion Yayuk Basuki.

== Philanthropy ==
Baramuli created a foundation, Yayasan Baramuli, to provide grants for his employees.

He is credited with supporting universities in South Sulawesi and North Sulawesi, as well as a pesantren (Islamic boarding school) in Pinrang. He was a member of the Board of Trustees of Hasanuddin University from 1975 to 1977.

== Illness and death ==
In January 2006, Baramuli was hospitalized in Singapore for three days. Thereafter, he regularly visited Singapore for treatment. On 11 October 2006, he died at the age of 76 at his residence at Jalan Imam Bonjol in Menteng, Central Jakarta. His younger brother, Eddy, said he died of liver disease after suffering hepatitis. Among the prominent figures who visited his house to mourn him were Habibie, Harmoko, Jusuf Kalla, Ryaas Rasyid and Paska Suzetta. Baramuli was buried at Kalibata Heroes' Cemetery. Dignitaries at his funeral included MPR speaker Ginandjar Kartasasmita, as well as President Susilo Bambang Yudhoyono.

== Awards ==
In 1999, he received the Anugerah Bintang award from President Habibie.

== Books ==
Baramuli was the author and/or subject of several books.

- Masyarakat Bertanya, Baramuli Menjawab (1998). A collection of interviews and news articles on Baramuli.
- Pemikiran Tentang Pembangunan Ekonomi dan Politik Masa Orde Baru (1998). A collection of articles on political and economic issues of Suharto's New Order regime.
- DPA Dari Zaman ke Zaman (2000) A history of the DPA, co-authored with Abdul Gafur.
- Baramuli Menggugat Politik Zaman (2000). A biography by Julius Pour.
- Perjuangan Membangun Indonesia Timur - Volume 2 (2001). A history of economic development in Eastern Indonesia.
- A.A. Baramuli Yang Kukenal (2007). Biographical essays of Baramuli by Bachtiar Adnan Kusuma et al.
