= Ani Abbas Manopo =

- Born: 4 May 1909; Langowan, Minahasa, North Sulawesi, Dutch East Indies
- Education: RHS Batavia
- Known for: First Indonesian female lawyer

Ani Abbas Manopo (born 4 May 1909, date of death unknown) was the first Indonesian woman to receive a law degree. She completed her studies at the College of Law (RHS or Rechts Hooge School) in Batavia (now Jakarta). She would go on to practice law in Sumatra and become dean of faculties at the University of North Sumatra and the State University of Medan.

== Biography ==
Ani Manopo was born on 4 May 1909 in Langowan, which is located in the region of Minahasa in North Sulawesi. Her parents were Wolter Manopo and Anna Massie. In 1915, she started attending a primary education Dutch language school called Speciale School, which is equivalent to the Dutch-Native School (HIS or Hollandsch-Inlandsche School). Then from 1923 to 1927, Manopo attended advanced primary school (MULO or Meer Uitgebreid Lager Onderwijs). This school was located in Tondano, which about 20 kilometers from Langowan. The next school Manopo attended was not in the island of Sulawesi, but in the island of Java. This high school level school was located in Bandung and called Algemene Middelbare School (AMS). Among Manopo's classmates were Mohammad Natsir and Sutan Sjahrir.

In 1930, Manopo started her studies at RHS Batavia. During this time, she met and married her husband, Abdul Abbas, who was also studying at RHS. Manopo graduated in 1935, becoming the first Indonesian woman to receive a law degree. In 1945, Manopo's husband was selected to be part of the Preparatory Committee for Indonesian Independence. After the proclamation of Indonesian independence, Abbas became the representative of the Indonesian government in Sumatra. Manopo followed her husband on a tour announcing the proclamation of independence throughout Sumatra all the way to Medan, which would be their eventual home.

In addition to practicing law, Manopo became involved in the formation of a Faculty of Law (or Fakultas Hukum) at the University of North Sumatra. She became dean of the faculty in 1955. In 1957, she was involved in the formation of a Faculty of Teacher Training and Education (FKIP or Fakultas Keguruan dan Ilmu Pendidikan) at the same university. She became of the dean of this faculty in 1957. This faculty would eventually become the State University of Medan.

== Bibliography ==
- Alisjahbana, Tamalia (20 September 2019). "Women Accuse: an Art Exhibition and Book to Correct the Position of Indonesian Women in History". Independent Observer.
- Lubis, Muchsin (26 August 2009). "Pejuang Ikhlas Yang Dilupakan" [The Sincere Hero Who was Forgotten]. Waspada (in Indonesian). p. 13.
- Ramadhan Karta Hadimadja (1988). A.E. Kawilarang: Untuk Sang Merah Putih [A.E. Kawilarang: For the Red-and-White] (in Indonesian). Jakarta: Pustaka Sinar Harapan.
- Sembiring, Eris Estrada (13 February 2014). "Linda Idolakan Mertua, Ani Abas Manopo" [Linda Looks Up To Mother-in-law, Ani Abas Manopo] (in Indonesian). Tribunnews.
- "Sejarah Unimed" [History of the State University of Medan] (in Indonesian). State University of Medan.
- Susetio, Jefri (11 January 2014). "Penghargaan Untuk 12 Eks Dekan FH USU" [Awards for 12 Dean Emeriti of the Faculty of Law at the University of North Sumatra] (in Indonesian). Tribunnews.
- Suwondo, Nani (1968). Kedudukan Wanita Indonesia dalam Hukum and Masyarakat [The Position of Indonesian Women in Law and Society] (in Indonesian). Timun Mas.
- Tapingkae, Amnuay (1974). Directory of Selected Scholars and Researchers in Southeast Asia. Regional Institute of Higher Education and Development.
- "Sejarah Fakultas" [History of Faculty] (in Indonesian). Faculty of Law, University of North Sumatra.
- Woodsmall, Ruth Frances; Dodge, Bayard (1960). Women and the New East. Washington, D.C.: Middle East Institute.
