= Ririn Setyarini =

Indonesian politician & actress

- Born: Ririn Setyarini; March 23, 1989 (age 37); Jakarta, Indonesia
- Other name: Juwita Setyarini Soetrisno
- Occupations: Actress; Model; Politician
- Years active: 2008–2019 (Entertainer); 2019 - Present (Politician)
- Political party: Gerindra (2019 - present)

Ririn Setyarini (born March 23, 1989) is an Indonesian politician and former or retired actress. She first played the movies liked Setannya Kok Beneran ?. And now she is a member politician of Gerindra Party

== Career ==
Ririn began her career as an actress of movie Setannya Kok Beneran ?. She decided to retire from the entertainment world in 2019 because her dream since childhood was to enter the world of politics and become a member of the People's Representative Council of the United States of Indonesia (DPRD) for Gerindra Party to serve the country and the people.

== Personal life ==
Ririn Setyarini was born on March 23, 1989, in Jakarta, of Manado descent. She has completed her education in three years studying bachelor's degree at the London Schools of Public Relations,

== Filmography ==
=== Movies ===
- Setannya Kok Beneran? (2008)
- Kalau Cinta Jangan Cengeng (2009)
- The Maling Kuburans (2009)
- Arwah Goyang Jupe-Depe (2011)
- Cinta Momo & Tejo di Antara Angkringan

=== Soap operas ===
- Cinta Fitri 3 SCTV
- Calon Bini SCTV
- Anissa dan Anissa SCTV
