= List of governors of North and Central Sulawesi =

The province of North and Central Sulawesi was a province in Indonesia that was short-lived, lasting only four years from 1960 to 1964. It was established as part of the separation of the province of Sulawesi into the province of North and Central Sulawesi and the province of South and Southeast Sulawesi. In 1964, the province of North and Central Sulawesi was separated into the province of North Sulawesi and the province of Central Sulawesi.

== Governors of North and Central Sulawesi ==
#	Photo	Name	Took office	Left office	Notes
1		Arnold Baramuli	1960	1962	
2		Frits Johanes Tumbelaka	15 June 1962	23 September 1964	Was acting governor until 27 July 1962
