= List of governors of North Sulawesi =

Governor of North Sulawesi
- Coat of arms of North Sulawesi

- Flag of North Sulawesi (non-civil)

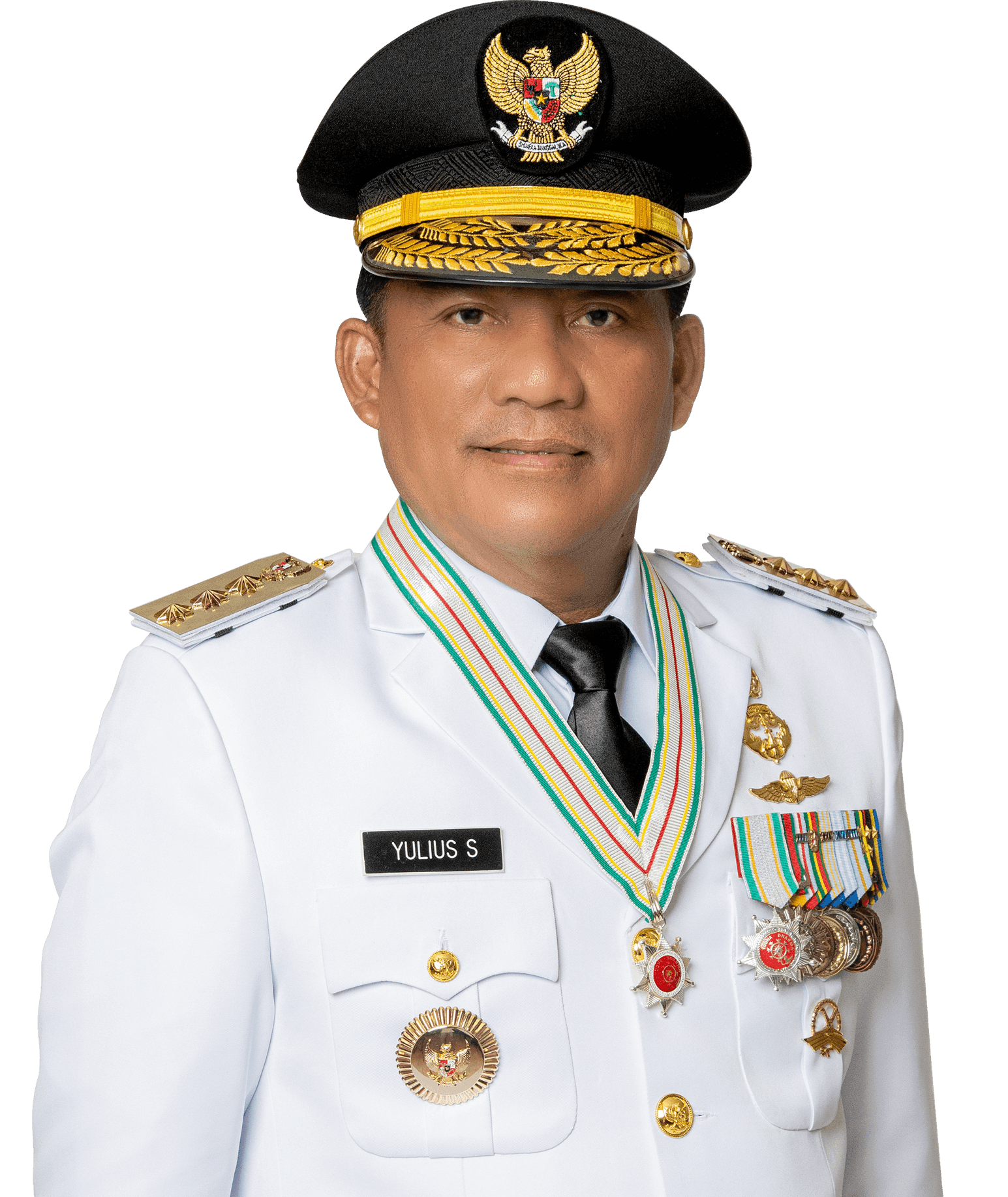
- Incumbent; Yulius Selvanus since 20 February 2025
- North Sulawesi Provincial Government
- Style: Mr. Governor (informal); His Excellency (diplomatic)
- Type: Chief executive
- Status: Head of government
- Abbreviation: GONS (in English); Gub. Sultra (in Indonesian)
- Nominator: Political parties
- Appointer: Direct popular elections within North Sulawesi or President members of the North Sulawesi Regional House of Representatives (formerly)
- Term length: Five years, renewable once 1 years (specifically for the acting governor)
- Formation: 1964
- First holder: F. J. Tumbelaka (Note: Arnold Achmad Baramuli could also be considered as the inaugural holder as he was the first governor of the province of North and Central Sulawesi in which North Sulawesi was a part of until it became a separate province from Central Sulawesi on 23 September 1964.)
- Salary: Rp3 million (US$179,47) per month
- Website: sulutprov.go.id

The province of North Sulawesi is a province in Indonesia that was established as part of the separation of the province of North and Central Sulawesi into the province of North Sulawesi and the province of Central Sulawesi in 1964.

#	Photo	Name	Took office	Left office	Deputy Governor	Notes
1		Frits Johanes Tumbelaka	23 September 1964	19 March 1965		
2		Sunandar Prijosudarmo	19 March 1965	27 April 1966		
3		Abdullah Amu	27 April 1966	2 March 1967		
4		Hein Victor Worang	2 March 1967	21 June 1978		
5		Willy Ghayus Alexander Lasut	21 June 1978	20 October 1979		
6		Gustaf Hendrik Mantik	3 March 1980	4 March 1985		
7		Cornelis John Rantung	4 March 1985	1 March 1995	Abdulah Mokoginta; Ahmad Nadjamudin	
8		Evert Ernest Mangindaan	1 March 1995	15 March 2000	Ahmad Nadjamudin; Jos Buce Wenas; Hasan Abas Nusi	
9		Adolf Jouke Sondakh	15 March 2000	18 March 2005	Freddy Harry Sualang	
10		Sinyo Harry Sarundajang	13 August 2005	13 August 2010	Freddy Harry Sualang	
10		Sinyo Harry Sarundajang	14 September 2010	14 September 2015	Djouhari Kansil	
11		Olly Dondokambey	12 February 2016	12 February 2021	Steven Kandouw	
11		Olly Dondokambey	15 February 2021	20 February 2025	Steven Kandouw	
12		Yulius Selvanus	20 February 2025	Incumbent	Victor Mailangkay	

== Acting governors ==
The following is a list of acting governors of North Sulawesi. An acting governor is appointed when the incumbent governor's has completed and a new governor has not been appointed, or when the incumbent governor takes a leave of absence to campaign for the next gubernatorial elections.

Photo	Name	Took office	Left office	Notes
	Erman Hari Rustaman	20 October 1979	3 March 1980	
	Lucky Harry Korah	18 March 2005	13 August 2005	
	Robby Mamuaja	13 August 2010	14 September 2010	
	Soni Sumarsono	20 September 2015	12 February 2016	
	Agus Fatoni	26 September 2020	5 December 2020	
