= G.H. Mantik =

Indonesian statesman

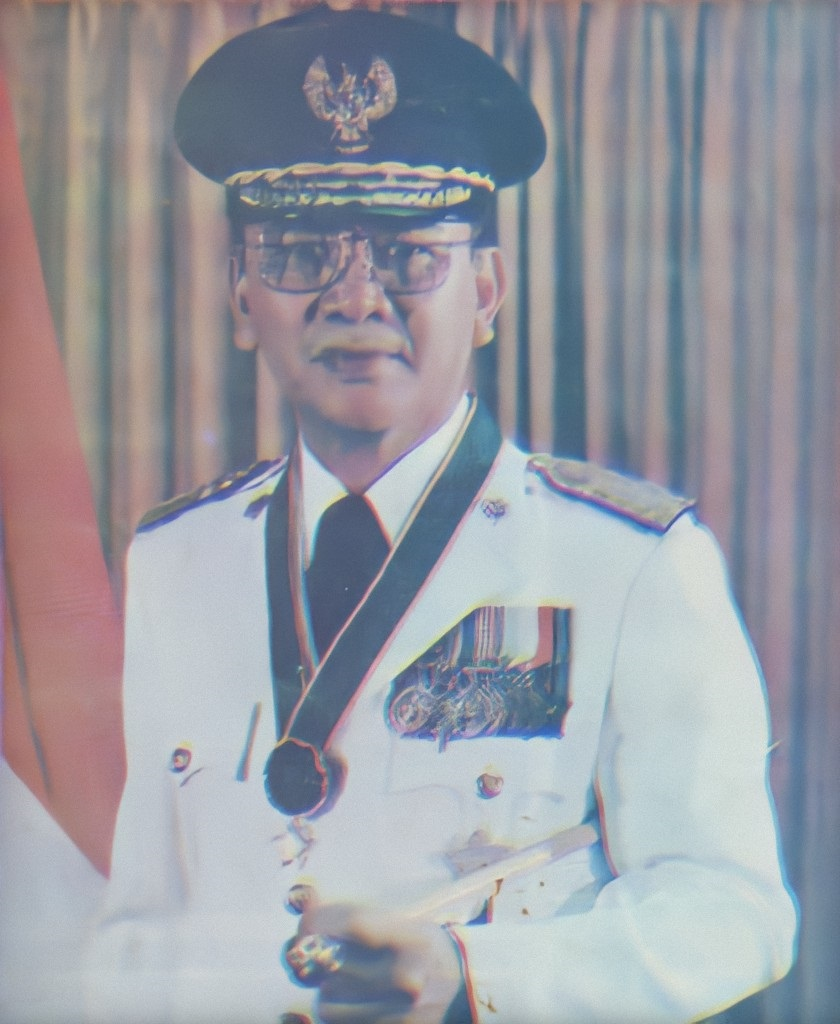
- circa 1971

Governor of North Sulawesi
- In office March 3, 1980 – March 4, 1985
- President: Suharto
- Preceded by: Erman Hari Rustaman
- Succeeded by: Cornelis John Rantung

Personal details
- Born: April 26, 1928 Bandung, Dutch East-Indies
- Died: August 8, 2001 (aged 73) Jakarta, Indonesia
- Spouse: Annette Julien Mingkid

Military service
- Allegiance: Indonesia
- Branch/service: Indonesian Army
- Rank: Lieutenant general

Gustaf "Guus" Hendrik Mantik (26 April 1928 – 8 August 2001) was an Indonesian military officer, governor, and parliamentarian. Mantik began his military career in 1946 as part the "Loyalty of the Indonesian People from Sulawesi" (or Kebaktian Rakjat Indonesia Sulawesi (KRIS)) during the Indonesian National Revolution. Later in his military career, Mantik would become territorial commander of two military districts: Military Territory IX / East Kalimantan (or Kodam IX/Mulawarman) from 1971 to 1973 and Military Territory V / Jakarta (or Kodam Jaya) from 1973 to 1977. He was appointed Governor of North Sulawesi in 1980 and held the office until 1985. After the death of Sunandar Prijosudarmo, Mantik assumed Sunandar's role as Deputy Chairman of the People's Consultative Assembly (or Majelis Permusyawaratan Rakyat (MPR)) until 1987. Mantik died on 8 August 2001 and was buried in the Kalibata Heroes' Cemetery in Jakarta.

== Bibliography ==
- Djamily, Mizwar, ed. (1986). Mengenal Kabinet RI Selama 40 Tahun Indonesia Merdeka [The Cabinet of the Republic of Indonesia 40 Years since Independence]. Jakarta: Kreasi Jaya Utama.
- "Former MPR Deputy Speaker G.H. Mantik Dies". The Jakarta Post. 9 August 2001.
- Kimura, Ehito (2013). Political Change and Territoriality in Indonesia: Provincial Proliferation. London: Routledge.
- Gosal, Roelof; Tumembouw, Charles; Karamoy, Herman (1998). G.H. Mantik: Profil Seorang Pejuang Prajurit [G.H. Mantik: A Profile of a Fighting Soldier]. Jakarta: PT. Terang Esa Agung Indonesia.
- "Indonesian Army Territorial Commanders 1950 -- March 1983". Indonesia. 35: 109–124. April 1983.
