= Setannya Kok Beneran =

Ghost Busted? (Setannya Kok Beneran?)
- Directed by: Muchyar Syamas
- Screenplay by: Raya Fahreza
- Produced by: Hasrat Djoeir Gita Jiwatram
- Starring: Indra Birowo; Mario Lawalata; Ence Bagus; Jill Gladys; Chandra Louise; Jojon; Tessy; Dewi Safira
- Cinematography: Setia Wijaya
- Edited by: Whiske Besa & Novadi
- Music by: Regina Lam & N'cek Creo
- Production company: Millenium Visitama Films
- Distributed by: Starvision Plus
- Release date: July 24, 2008
- Running time: 91 minutes
- Country: Indonesia
- Language: Indonesia

Ghost Busted or Setannya Kok Beneran? (lit. 'Why is the Ghost Real?') is a 2008 Indonesian horror comedy feature film. The film was directed by Muchyar Syamas, written by Raya Fahreza, and stars Mario Lawalata, Indra Birowo, Ence Bagus, Jill Gladys, Jojon, Chandra Louise, and Tessy. The film was released on July 24, 2008, and is a Millenium Visitama Films and Starvision Plus production.

== Plot ==
Ferdi (Mario Lawalata), Andi (Indra Birowo), and Yatno (Ence Bagus) pretend to be ghostbusters on a TV reality show called The Demon Conquerors, which is on the verge of cancellation. One day, the show's fan club manager informs the three that the program has become a big hit in a small village and that they have been invited there for a meet-and-greet. Upon their arrival, the trio discovers that the villagers want the Demon Conquerors to exorcise the ghost of Sari (Dewi Safira).
