= Nani Soewondo-Soerasno =

Indonesian feminist and activist (1918-)

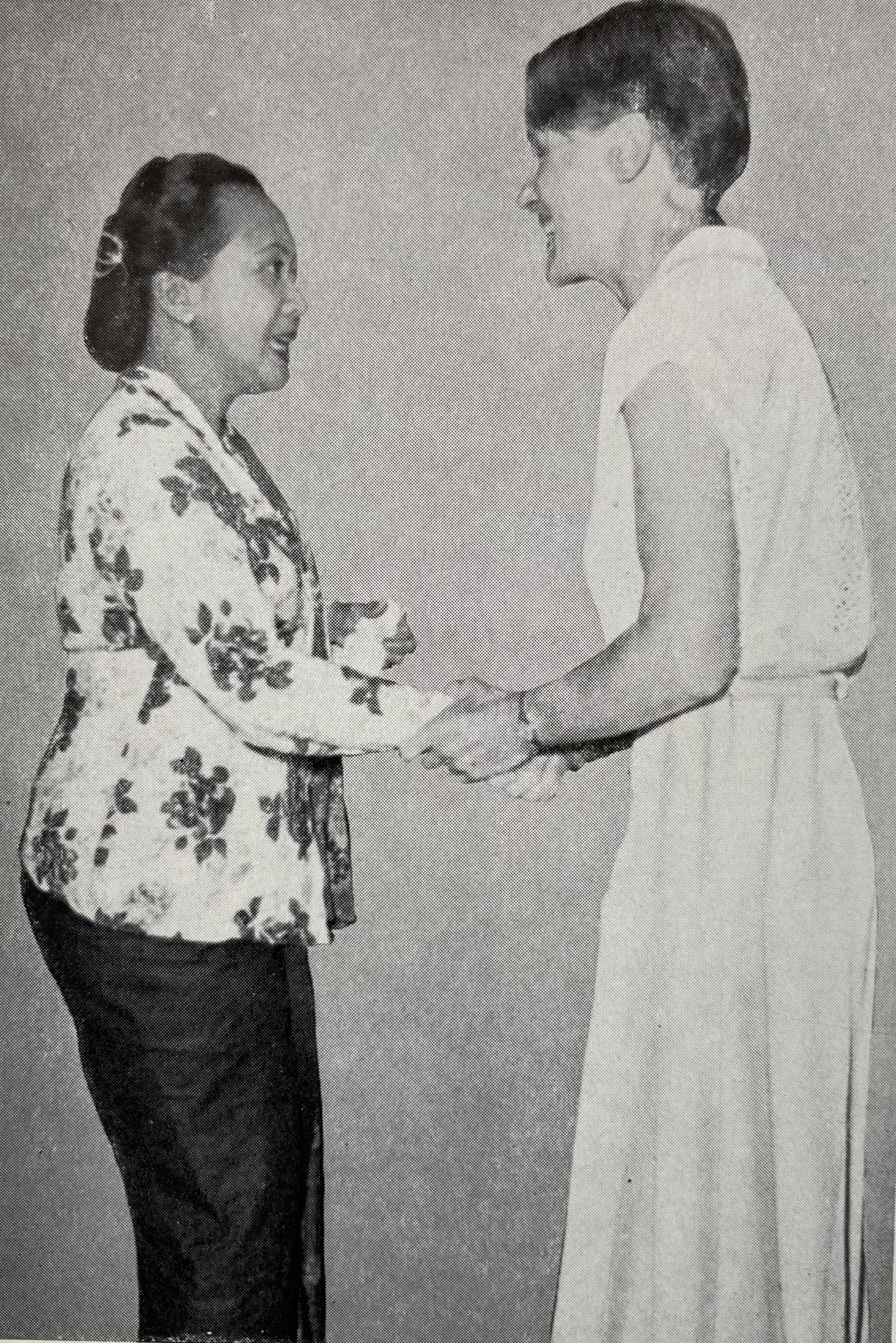
- Soewondo with a Dutch author, Cora Vreede-de Stuers, in 1957
- Born: 15 August 1918; Semarang, Dutch East Indies
- Other names: Nani Suwondo
- Occupation(s): Lawyer, activist

Nani Soewondo-Soerasno (Note: In some sources, her name is given as Nani Suwondo.) (born 15 August 1918 – date of death unknown) was an Indonesian lawyer, suffragist, and women's rights activist.

== Early life ==
Soewondo-Soerasno was born in Semarang in 1918 to a middle-class family. Her parents supported her choice to study law in what was then called Batavia (now Jakarta). She graduated in 1942 from the Faculty of Law at the University of Indonesia. While studying, she was assistant to Soepomo, who would become known as the Father of the Indonesian Constitution.

== Career ==
Soon after graduating, Soweondo took a position with the Department of Justice. Soewondo was a member of the NTR Commission (Nikah, Talak, Rudjuk) on marriage inequity set up by the 1949 Women's Congress, serving as secretary. In 1950, the Indonesian government backed this commission and asked it to form new matrimonial legislation.

Soewondo continued to work closely with Maria Ulfah Santoso and the Indonesian Women's Congress in the early 1950s. She was vice-president of the Women's Congress in the 1950s. She served as editor-in-chief of Suara Perwari, the publication of Perwari (the Union of the Women of the Republic of Indonesia). Soewondo also filled the role of president of the legal part of Perwari. In 1955, she helped organize the Perhimpunan Wanita Universitas Indonesia (Association of Indonesian University Women), with herself as inaugural leader.

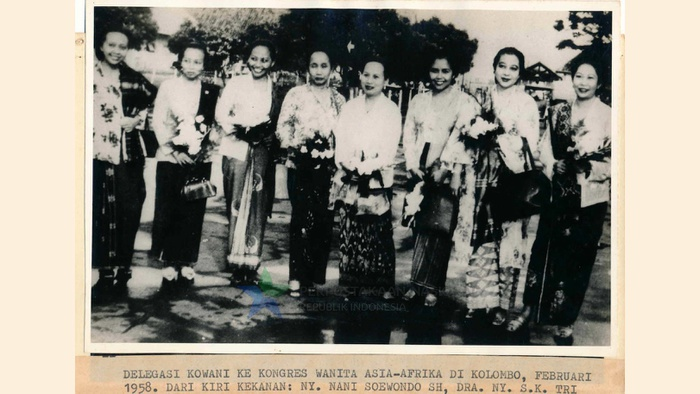
Soewondo (far left) along with other Indonesian feminist leaders at the 1958 Asian-African Women's Conference in Colombo

In 1957, she served as a delegate to a United Nations conference in Colombo on increasing participation in civic life for Asian women. In 1958, she participated in a 'study tour' of Australia to build cross-country links between Indonesian and Australian women's organizations. In 1959, she was awarded a scholarship in honor of Elin Wägner by the Swedish government to carry out research on the history of Indonesian women's rights. Described as a "forthright and experienced" woman, she was one of a number of prominent feminist leaders of the 1950s. Mujīburraḥmān, an Indonesian historian, calls her "a leading activist of women's rights" in post-independence Indonesia.

The main part of her work was aimed at marriage laws. In the late 1950s, Soewondo served as part of a three-member commission to develop the precise wording of the proposed marriage act, which she subsequently advocated for. Soewondo wrote in her book, Kedudukan wanita Indonesia, that the "deplorable situation" of Indonesian women would not improve until legislation to "protect women against polygamy and repudiation" are enacted. She contrasted Indonesia unfavorably with another Muslim nation, Tunisia, which she viewed as being more active in providing legal protection for women in marriage and outlawing child marriage.

Soewondo worked to raise the age of marriage for girls, showing "outstanding dedication"; a 1973 research report on child marriage, which she helped author, helped lead to the 1974 Marriage Law reforms. She also worked to combat polygamy and served as the vice-president of Planned Parenthood in Indonesia from 1957. In 1981, she published a book on the status of Indonesian women under the law, which the Australian historian Susan Blackburn notes was unusual for its time period.

Soewondo had five children.
