= Willy Lasut =

Military officer and governor

Governor of North Sulawesi
- In office June 21, 1978 – October 20, 1979
- President: Suharto
- Preceded by: Hein Victor Worang
- Succeeded by: Erman Hari Rustaman

Personal details
- Born: January 28, 1926 Tondano, Minahasa, Dutch East-Indies
- Died: April 4, 2003 (aged 77) Jakarta, Indonesia

Military service
- Allegiance: Indonesia
- Branch/service: Indonesian Army
- Rank: Major General

Willy Ghayus Alexander Lasut (28 January 1926 – 4 April 2003) was a military officer and governor of North Sulawesi. His tenure as Governor of North Sulawesi was abruptly terminated after only 16 months in office. No official explanation was given, but during his time as governor, many of his actions were deemed disloyal to the central government. He enacted a plan that raised the price of the local commodity of cloves to 17.500 Rupiah. This greatly increased the livelihoods of local producers, but angered those outside of the province who were receiving "dividends" from clove sales. Lasut refused to resign and protested his dismissal by not attending the swearing in of his replacement. Lasut died on 4 April 2003 and was buried in the Kalibata Heroes' Cemetery in Jakarta.

Lasut's brother, Arie Lasut, is a National Hero who was killed during the Indonesian National Revolution. His great-grandson is Dougy Mandagi of the Australian indie rock band The Temper Trap and wrote the sleeper hit Sweet Disposition
