= Arie Frederik Lasut =

Indonesian national hero

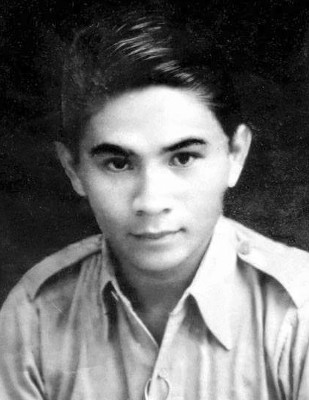

1st Chief of Mining and Geology of the Republic of Indonesia

Personal details
- Born: 6 July 1918 Minahasa, North Sulawesi, Dutch East Indies
- Died: 7 May 1949 (aged 30) Yogyakarta, Indonesia
- Spouse: Nieke Maramis
- Children: Winny Lasut
- Profession: Chief of Mining

Arie Frederik Lasut (Kapataran, 6 July 1918 – Pakem, 7 May 1949) was a National Hero of Indonesia, because of his involvement in the struggle for independence and his efforts to advance Indonesia’s mining and geological infrastructure during the nation’s beginnings. Arie Lasut was born in Kapataran, a village in the regency of Minahasa in the province of North Sulawesi. He was the eldest son of eight children born to Darius Lasut and Ingkan Supit. His brother, Willy Lasut, went on to become governor of North Sulawesi.

== Education ==
Lasut attended a Hollandsch-Inlandsche School (HIS) in Tondano. Having been ranked first in his class, Lasut was given the opportunity to continue his studies at a Hollandsch Inlandsche Kweekschool (HIK) in Ambon. He finished his studies at HIK Ambon in 1933 and was one of the top students who were selected to attend HIK Bandung for the next level of teacher education. After only a year in Bandung, Lasut decided not to become a teacher and instead moved to Batavia (now Jakarta) to attend an Algemene Middelbare School (AMS) . After graduating from AMS in 1937, Arie started medical school (Dutch: Geneeskundige Hooge School). The school is now the Department of Medicine at the University of Indonesia. His lack of sufficient funds forced him to drop out after just one year of studying. In 1938, Lasut started working at the Department of Economic Affairs (Dutch: Departement van Economische Zaken).

A year later, Lasut attended Bandung Technical School (Dutch: Technische Hoogeschool te Bandung), which is present day Bandung Institute of Technology. His studies were discontinued again due to monetary reasons. He then applied for and was given a scholarship to become a geological assistant at the Mining Service (Dutch: Dienst van den Mijnbouw). With the start of World War II and the imminent Japanese forces pushing toward Indonesia. While at technical school in Bandung, Lasut was trained as a Corps Rerserve Officer by the Dutch to aid in the defense against the attacking Japanese forces. He eventually fought against the Japanese at Ciater in West Java. During the Japanese occupation of the Dutch East Indies, Lasut worked at the Geological Service (Japanese: Chorisitsu Chosayo) in Bandung as an assistant in the field of geology. Along with R. Sunu Sumosusastro, Lasut was among a few Indonesians who were given such positions in the service by the Japanese.

== Struggle for Independence ==
The grave of Arie Frederik Lasut

After Indonesia's declaration of independence on 17 August 1945, as well and the surrender of Japan to the Allies, the president of the newly formed Republic of Indonesia ordered that all governmental services be taken over from the Japanese. Lasut and a few other Indonesians were able to take control of the Geological Service peacefully in September 1945 and renamed it the Mining and Geological Service (Indonesian: Jawatan Pertambangan dan Geologi). As the Dutch returned to regain its control of Indonesia, the offices of the Mining and Geological Service had to be moved several times. From its original headquarters in Bandung, the offices moved Tasikmalaya, Magelang, and Yogyakarta. In addition to managing the mining and geological activities of the new nation during an unstable period, the service also established schools for training new geologists. This was all done under the leadership of Lasut as head of the service.

In addition to his work at the Mining and Geological Service, Lasut was active in an organization consisting of Indonesians from Sulawesi (where he was from) aimed at defending the independence of Indonesia (Indonesian: Kebaktian Rakyat Indonesia Sulawesi). Lasut was also a member of the Central Indonesian National Committee (Indonesian: Komite Nasional Indonesia Pusat), an early manifestation of the legislative branch of the Indonesian government.

The Dutch had continually sought after Lasut, because of his knowledge of mining and geology in Indonesia. On the morning of 7 May 1949, Lasut was taken from his home by the Dutch to Pakem, 7 kilometers north of Yogyakarta (then the capital of Indonesia) and was shot to death. Several months later his body was exhumed and buried at the Kintelan Christian cemetery in Yogyakarta beside his wife who had died in December 1947. The ceremony was attended by the acting president of Indonesia at that time, Assaat.

To honor his firm stance to preserve the republic, Arie Frederik Lasut was posthumously named a national hero by President Suharto on 20 May 1969.

== Family life ==
Arie Lasut married Nieke Maramis on 31 December 1941. They had one child, Winny Lasut, who married Lukman Arifin and had three grandsons: Iskandar Zulkarnaen Arifin, Arie Arifin, Sandy Arifin. Winny died on 14 July 1976.
