= Frans Mendur =

Indonesian journalistic photographer

- Born: April 16, 1913; Kawangkoan, North Sulawesi, Dutch East Indies
- Died: April 24, 1971 (aged 58); Jakarta, Indonesia
- Occupation: Photographer

Frans Soemarta Mendur (16 April 1913 – 24 April 1971) was an Indonesian journalistic photographer whose photos of the Proclamation of Indonesian Independence were the only photos published of the historic event. He also photographed other iconic photos recording the struggle of the young nation.

Mendur was working at the Japan-backed Indonesian newspaper Asia Raya when he heard that the proclamation would be announced by Sukarno at his home at Pegangsaan Timur No. 56. After independence, Mendur worked briefly at the Indonesian newspaper Merdeka. In 1946, he established the Indonesian Press Photo Service (IPPHOS) with Oscar Ganda, Alex Mamusung, Alex Mendur (his brother), Frans Umbas, and Justus Umbas.

Mendur along with his brother, Alex, received the Bintang Jasa Utama on 9 November 2009 for their photo journalistic roles during the beginning of the republic. The following year, they received the Bintang Mahaputera Nararya on 12 November 2010. A monument in honor of them in their hometown of Kawangkoan was dedicated by President Susilo Bambang Yudhoyono on 11 February 2013. Mendur was the fourth of eleven children of August Mendur and Ariantje Mononimbar.

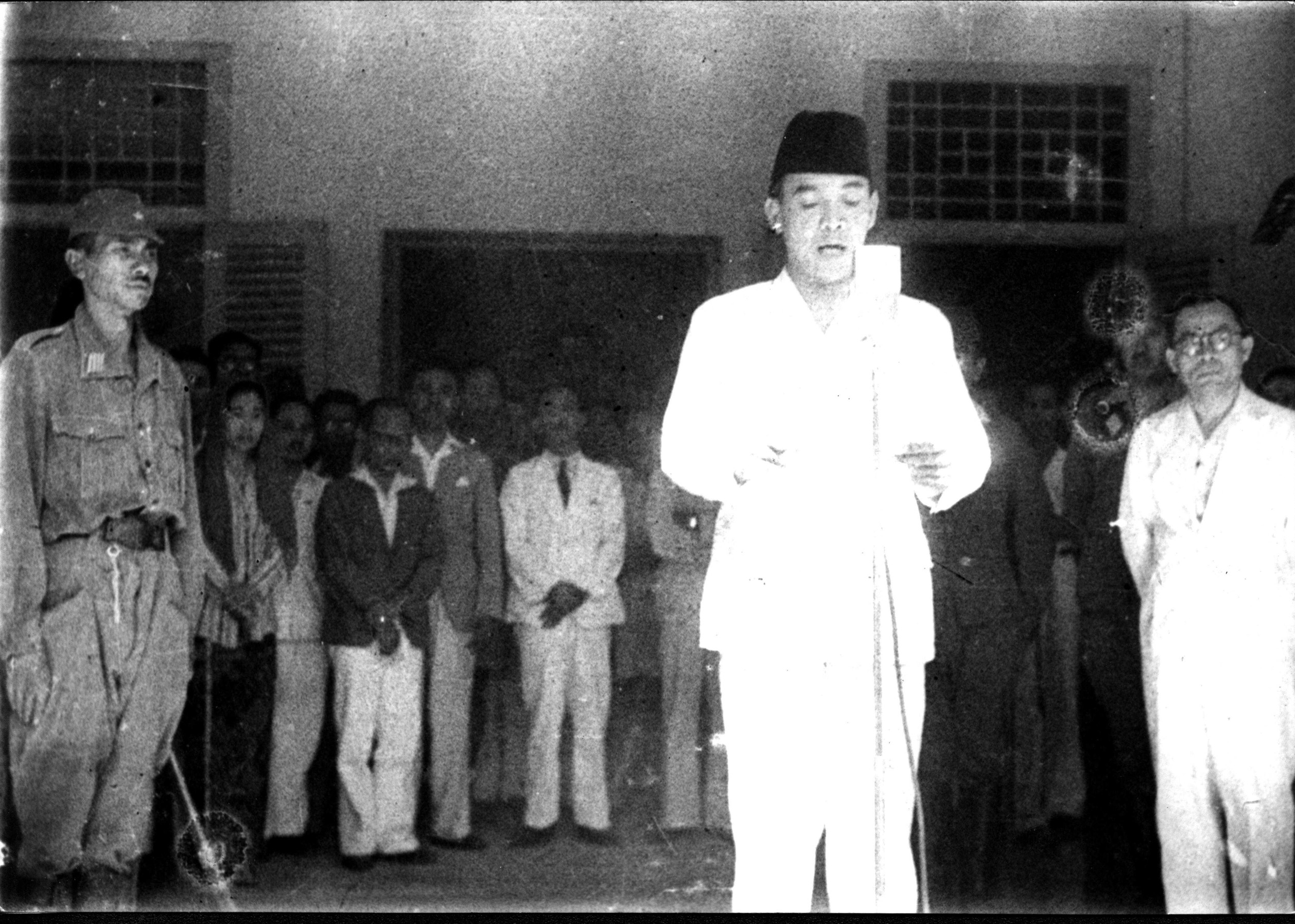
Sukarno reading the declaration of independence

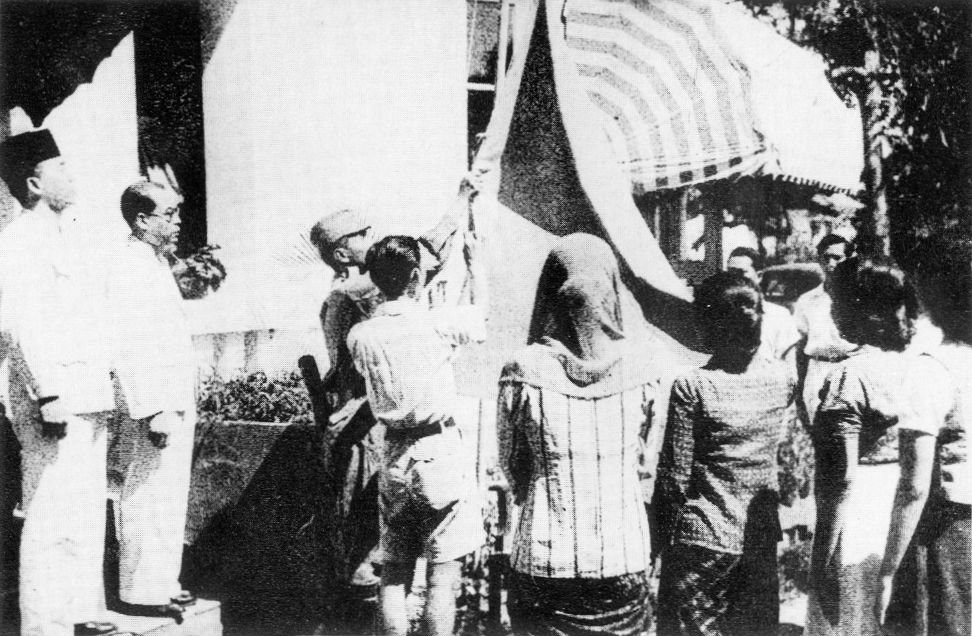
Raising the Indonesian flag during the ceremony

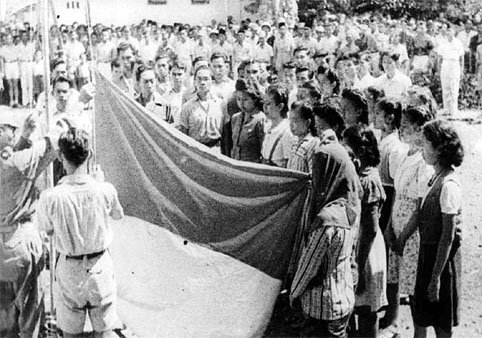
Raising the Indonesian flag in front of the witnesses

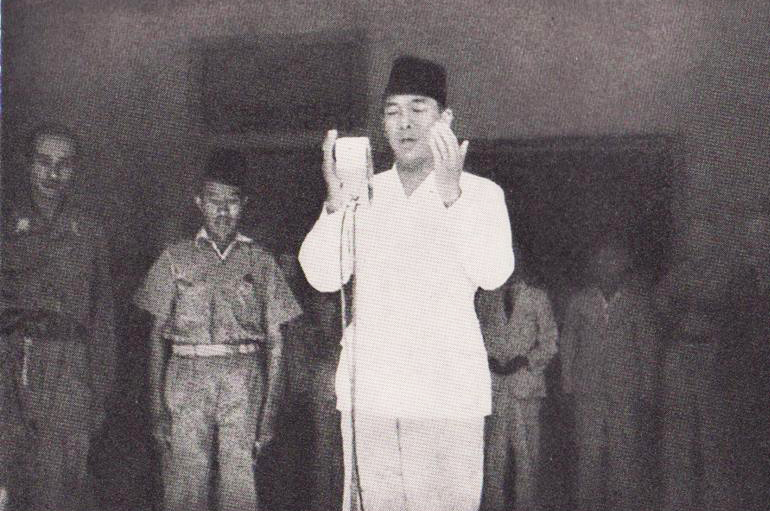
Soekarno praying during the Proclamation of Indonesian Independence

Photographs by Frans Mendur during the declaration of Indonesian independence ceremony

== Bibliography ==
- Adam, Asvi Warman (2008). Identitas untuk Kebangkitan: IPPHOS, Antara, dan Cas Oorthuys, 1945-1950 [An Identity for an Awakening: IPPHOS, Antara, and Cas Oorthuys, 1945-1950] (in Indonesian). Jakarta: Departemen Komunikasi dan Informatika, Republik Indonesia.
- Bambang (9 November 2009). "Pemerintah Anugerahkan Gelar Pahlawan Nasional" [The Government Recognizes National Heroes]. Antara News (in Indonesian).
- Kuswiah, Wiwi (1986). Alexius Impurung Mendur (Alex Mendur) (in Indonesian). Jakarta: Departemen Pendidikan dan Kebudayaan, Direktorat Sejarah dan Nilai Tradisional, Proyek Inventarisasi dan Dokumentasi Sejarah Nasional.
- Prasetyo, Aris (17 August 2014). "Cerita di Balik Foto Proklamasi Kemerdekaan Indonesia yang Terkenal Ini" [The Story Behind the Famous Photo of the Proclamation of Indonesian Independence]. Kompas (in Indonesian).
- Siwi Tri Puji B (12 November 2010). "Dua Jurnalis yang Abadikan Peristiwa Sejarah Terima Bintang Mahaputra" [Two Journalists Who Recorded Historical Events Receives the Bintang Mahaputra]. Republika (in Indonesian).
- Zoelverdi, Ed (1985). Mat Kodak: Melihat untuk Sejuta Mata [Mat Kodak: Viewing for a Million Eyes] (in Indonesian). Jakarta: Grafiti Pers.
