= Jeanne Mandagi =

Indonesian Police Brigadier General

Police Brigadier General Jeanne Mandagi
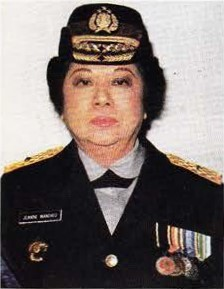

Head of Public Relations Division, Indonesian National Police
- In office 1989–1992

Personal details
- Born: 2 April 1937 Manado, North Sulawesi, Dutch East Indies
- Died: 7 April 2017 (aged 80) Jakarta, Indonesia

Military service
- Allegiance: Indonesia
- Branch/service: Indonesian National Police
- Years of service: 1965–1992
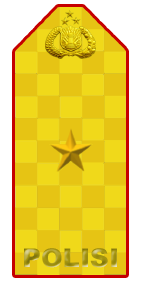
- Rank: Brigadier General

Police Brigadier General Jeanne Mandagi (2 April 1937 – 7 April 2017) was the first Indonesian woman to become a general in the Indonesian National Police. She also served as an expert consultant at the Indonesian National Narcotics Agency (BNN or Badan Narkotika Nasional Republik Indonesia) and was active in dealing with drug eradication in Indonesia.

== Background ==
Jeanne Mandagi was born on 2 April 1937 in Manado, which is located in the region of Minahasa in North Sulawesi. She attended catholic primary and secondary schools in Manado and Jakarta. She then attended the University of Indonesia in 1963 and received a degree in law. During her studies at the university, she was active in the Union of Catholic University Students of the Republic of Indonesia (PMKRI or Perhimpunan Mahasiswa Katolik Republik Indonesia).

== Career ==
After graduating from college, Mandagi began her police career at the police academy and was appointed as a female police officer on 1 December 1965. Then in 1966, Mandagi attended a course on military courts until she was appointed Head of the Maluku Regional Police Section on Legal Affairs. In 1970, Mandagi was given the mandate as the Head of the Greater Jakarta Metropolitan Regional Police Section on the Development of Children, Youth, and Women as well as serving as a judge of the Military Court for the Jakarta-Banten region. Mandagi's interests in preventing drug abuse began to be pursued by taking the United Nations Regional Course on the Control of Narcotics in 1974. One year later, she attended a drug law enforcement course in Washington, D.C.

After receiving several training certificates, Mandagi worked at the National Police Headquarters in the narcotics office in 1976. In 1980, she was appointed as a colonel after graduating from the Indonesian Armed Forces' Staff and Command School. In 1985, Mandagi served as Narcotics Desk Officer at the Association of Southeast Asian Nations (ASEAN) and in 1989 for seven months, she served as Secretary Director of the Public Relations office at the National Police Headquarters. In the same year and until 1992, Mandagi was entrusted to carry out the mandate as the Head of the Public Relations Division. Mandagi was appointed brigadier general in 1991, becoming the first woman in Indonesia to hold the rank of general of the police force.

Due to her vested interest in drug eradication in Indonesia, even in retirement, she was entrusted to serve as an expert adviser to Police General Tito Karnavian and chaired the Indonesian Anti Narcotics Law Enforcement Retirement Association (AP2ANI or Ketua Asosiasi Purnawiran Penegak Hukum Anti Narkotika Indonesia). She also took part in establishing the Permadi Siwi Foundation as a rehabilitation center for narcotics addicts.

Jeanne Mandagi died at the age of 80 on 7 April 2017 and was buried in the Jagakarsa Public Cemetery in South Jakarta.
