= Alex Mendur =

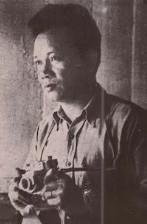
- Born: November 7, 1907; Kawangkoan, Minahasa, Dutch East Indies
- Died: December 30, 1984 (aged 77); Bandung, Indonesia
- Occupation: Photographer
- Spouse(s): Emmy Agustina Wowor (m. 1929–1950); Ines Manaroinsong (m. 1950–1984)
- Children: Meity Mendur (with Emmy); Lexi Rudolp Mendur (with Emmy); Mayon Mendur (with Ines)

Alexius Impurung Mendur (7 November 1907 – 30 December 1984) was an Indonesian journalistic photographer who was part of a group that established the Indonesia Press Photo Service (IPPHOS). This organization is credited for the many iconic photographs of people and events during the Indonesian National Revolution.

== During Dutch and Japanese occupation ==
Mendur was born in Kawangkoan on 7 November 1907. He was the first of eleven children of August Mendur and Ariance Mononimbar. He completed Volkschool (an elementary level school up to fifth grade), but afterwards did not continue his studies due to financial reasons. In 1922, Mendur moved to Batavia (now Jakarta) with Anton Nayoan, a family relative who had already settled in Batavia. Nayoan worked for a Dutch company that sold photographic supplies and taught Mendur how to use the camera. Mendur would eventually work for the same company and other photographic supply companies.

In 1932, Mendur was hired as a journalistic photographer at Java-bode, a Dutch newspaper that was published in Batavia. In 1936, he started work at the Dutch shipping company KPM (Koninklijke Paketvaart-Maatschappij). During the Japanese occupation of Indonesia, Mendur was assigned to the local branch of the Japanese news agency Dōmei Tsushin, where Mendur became head of the photographic department.

== Indonesian Independence and IPPHOS ==
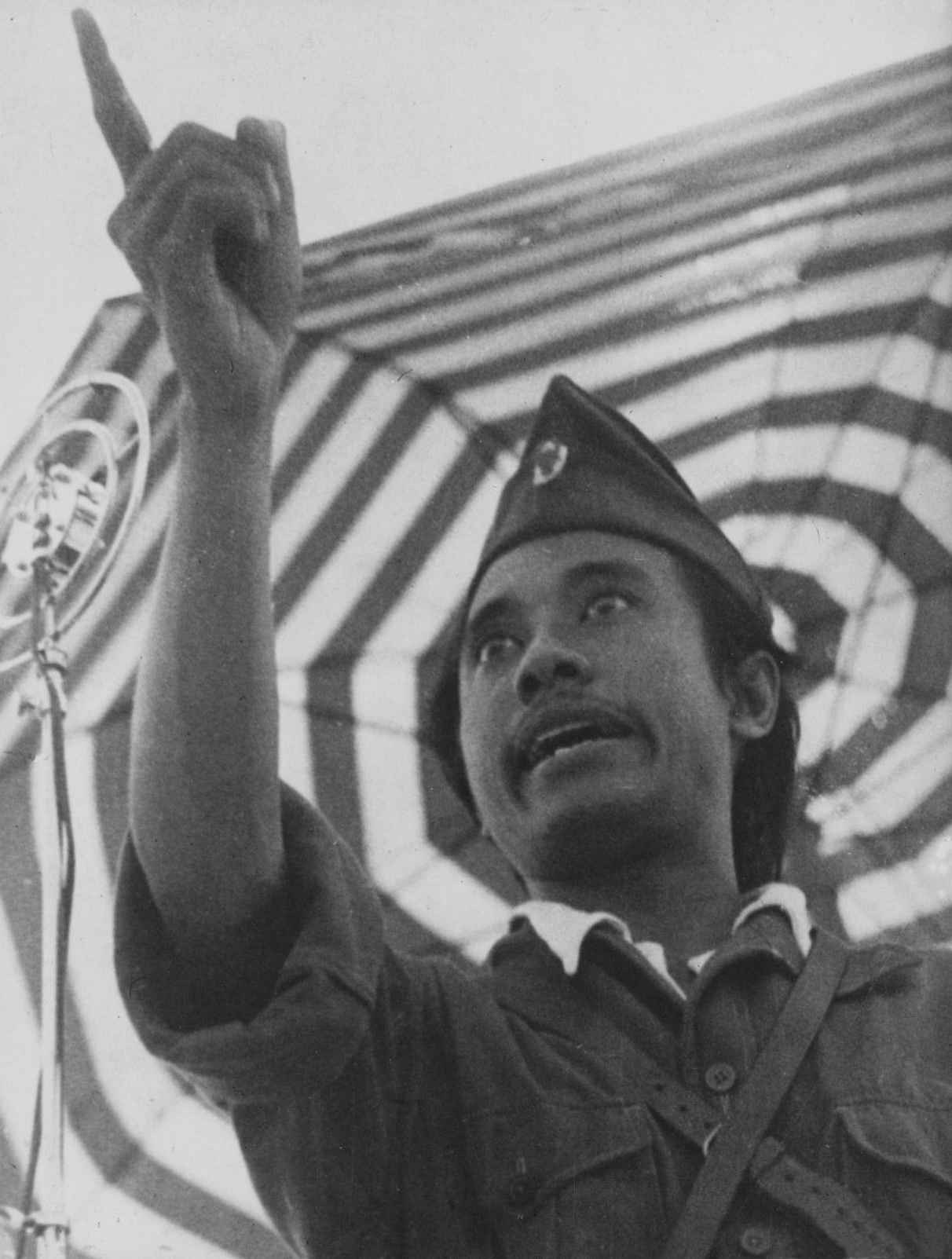
Photograph of Bung Tomo taken by Alex Mendur

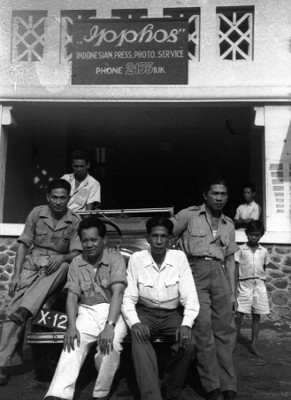
Mendur with other IPPHOS founders

In August 1945, through his contacts in Domei, Mendur found out about a ceremony where Indonesian leaders would proclaim the country's independence. He went with his brother, Frans Mendur, to Sukarno's residence where the ceremony was being held on 17 August 1945. They both took photographs the proclamation ceremony, but only Frans' photographs were processed and published as Alex's film was confiscated by the Japanese.

After independence, Mendur worked briefly at the Indonesian newspaper Merdeka. Then on 2 October 1946, Mendur established the IPPHOS with Oscar Ganda, Alex Mamusung, Frans Mendur, Frans Umbas, and Justus Umbas. They recognized the need to provide photographs to local and foreign news agencies on the current events in Indonesia, which at that time was dominated by the country's struggle to maintain its independence. They saw their work as their contribution to the struggle. The photographers of IPPHOS were credited for many iconic photographs that documented the struggle and were seen as important "witnesses" to history.

== Posthumous Awards ==
Mendur died on 30 December 1984 in Bandung. Mendur along with his brother, Frans, received posthumously the Bintang Jasa Utama in 2009 for their photo journalistic roles during the beginning of the republic. The following year, they received posthumously the Bintang Mahaputera Nararya. A monument and a small museum in honor of them in their hometown of Kawangkoan was dedicated by President Susilo Bambang Yudhoyono on 11 February 2013.

== See also ==
- Frans Mendur
- IPPHOS category on Wikimedia Commons

== Bibliography ==
- Bambang (9 November 2009). "Pemerintah Anugerahkan Gelar Pahlawan Nasional" [The Government Recognizes National Heroes]. Antara News (in Indonesian).
- Apa & Siapa, sejumlah orang Indonesia 1981-1982 [Who's Who, a selection of Indonesians 1981-1982] (in Indonesian). Jakarta: Grafiti Pers. 1981.
- Kuswiah, Wiwi (1986). Alexius Impurung Mendur (Alex Mendur) (in Indonesian). Jakarta: Departemen Pendidikan dan Kebudayaan, Direktorat Sejarah dan Nilai Tradisional, Proyek Inventarisasi dan Dokumentasi Sejarah Nasional.
- Harbunangin, Buntje (2006). Sepekan Menjelang Proklamasi [A Week Before the Proclamation] (in Indonesian). Jakarta: Tintamas.
- Hartanto, Agung Dwi (2007). Seabad Pers Kebangsaan, 1907-2007 [A Century of National Press, 1907-2007] (in Indonesian). Jakarta: I:Boekoe.
- "IPPHOS: The Silent Witness". Indonesia Magazine (in Indonesian). Vol. 20. Jakarta: Yayasan Harapan Kita. 1989.
- Prasetyo, Aris (17 August 2014). "Cerita di Balik Foto Proklamasi Kemerdekaan Indonesia yang Terkenal Ini" [The Story Behind the Famous Photo of the Proclamation of Indonesian Independence]. Kompas (in Indonesian).
- Siwi Tri Puji B (12 November 2010). "Dua Jurnalis yang Abadikan Peristiwa Sejarah Terima Bintang Mahaputra" [Two Journalists Who Recorded Historical Events Receives the Bintang Mahaputra]. Republika (in Indonesian).
- Wijaya, Taufan (2014). Foto Jurnalistik [Journalistic Photos] (in Indonesian). Jakarta: Gramedia Pustaka Utama.
- Zoelverdi, Ed (1985). Mat Kodak: Melihat untuk Sejuta Mata [Mat Kodak: Viewing for a Million Eyes] (in Indonesian). Jakarta: Grafiti Pers.
