= F. J. Tumbelaka =

Frits Johanes "Broer" Tumbelaka
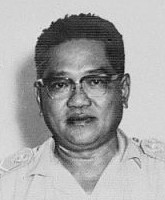
- Tumbelaka (circa 1964)

1st Governor of North Sulawesi
- In office 23 September 1964 – 19 March 1965
- Preceded by: Position established
- Succeeded by: Sunandar Prijosudarmo

2nd Governor of North and Central Sulawesi
- In office 27 July 1963 – 22 September 1964
- Preceded by: Arnold Achmad Baramuli
- Succeeded by: Split into the provinces of North Sulawesi and Central Sulawesi

Governor of North and Central Sulawesi (Acting)
- In office 15 June 1962 – 22 September 1964

Deputy Governor of North and Central Sulawesi
- In office 23 March 1960 – 14 June 1962
- Preceded by: Position established

Personal details
- Born: March 7, 1921 Surian, West Sumatera, Dutch East-Indies
- Died: August 20, 1983 (aged 62) Jakarta, Indonesia

Military service
- Branch/service: Indonesian Army
- Rank: Lieutenant Colonel

Frits Johanes Tumbelaka (7 March 1921 – 20 August 1983), also known as Broer Tumbelaka, served in the Indonesian military, rising to the rank of lieutenant colonel. He also served in the government as governor of North and Central Sulawesi and, after the province was split into North Sulawesi and Central Sulawesi, he served as the first governor of North Sulawesi. He played an important role in finding a peaceful solution to the conflict between the Indonesian government and the Permesta movement.

== Military service ==
After the Proclamation of Indonesian Independence, Tumbelaka joined the 6th Division of the Sea Army of the Republic of Indonesia or Tentara Laut Republik Indonesia (TLRI). In 1948, he became chief of staff of the 17th Battalion, First Brigade, First Division / Brawijaya. Tumbelaka became commander of the battalion on 25 September 1950 when his commander, Maj. Abdullah, was killed during the military operation against the Republic of South Maluku. He later became part of the senior staff of VII/East Indonesia Military Territory or Tentara dan Teritorium (TT) VII/Indonesia Timur.

== Government service ==
Tumbelaka's efforts to broker peace between the Indonesian government and the Permesta movement was formalized when he was appointed as deputy governor for North and Central Sulawesi on 23 March 1960. On 15 June 1962, he was appointed as acting governor and on 27 July 1962 as governor replacing A.A. Baramuli. When North Sulawesi and Central Sulawesi became separate provinces, Tumbelaka became the first governor of North Sulawesi on 23 September 1964.

== Brokering peace with Permesta ==
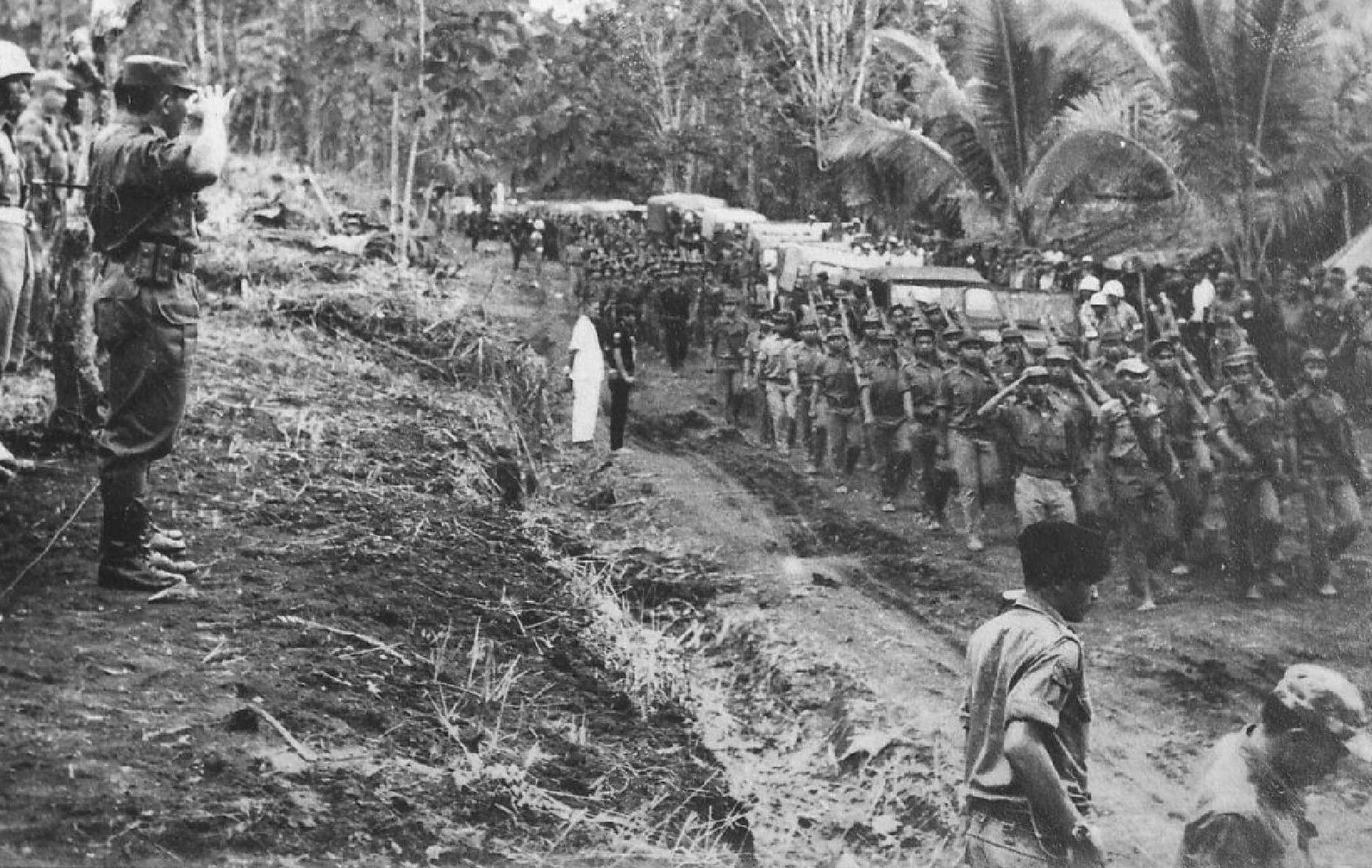
The commander of Kodam XIII / Merdeka saluting Permesta troops

Tumbelaka's efforts to broker peace between the Indonesian government and the Permesta movement began in October 1959 when he met with the commander of Kodam VIII / Brawijaya, Col. Surachman. The two discussed the possibility of a peaceful end to the conflict. After several meetings with the top brass of Kodam VII / Brawijaya and also leaders of the military operation against Permesta called Operation "Independence" or Operasi Merdeka, Tumbelaka was flown into Manado on 5 January 1960 in an attempt to meet with the leaders of Permesta in secret.

On 15 March 1960, Tumbelaka met with Col. Daniel Julius (D.J.) Somba in Matungkas in North Minahasa. Somba was a former officer of the Indonesian National Armed Forces or Tentara Nasional Indonesia (TNI) who joined the Permesta movement. After several meetings and negotiations between Tumbelaka and Permesta leaders, on 4 April 1961 a military ceremony was held on a field between Lopana and Malenos in South Minahasa. The ceremony was a formal act by soldiers of the Permesta movement to "return to Ibu Pertiwi". In turn, the soldiers were given amnesty. The ceremony was attended by Somba and Col. Sunandar Prijosudarmo, the commander of Kodam XIII / Merdeka, a position that Somba once held. Similar ceremonies occurred on 14 April 1961 and 12 May 1961. On 14 April, a ceremony in Woloan near Tomohon was attended by deputy commander of the Indonesian army, Maj. Gen. Hidayat, and also Brig. Gen. Achmad Yani. From the Permesta side, the ceremony was attended by Maj. Gen. Alex Kawilarang, who himself was a former commander of TT III / Siliwangi. Then on 12 May, commander of the Indonesian army, Gen. A.H. Nasution, attended ceremonies in Tomohon and Tondano.

== Personal life ==
Tumbelaka was born in West Sumatra and grew up in East Java. Tumbelaka's father, Johan Frederik Tumbelaka, was a medical doctor who worked for the Dutch East-Indies. Johan and his wife (whose last name was Sinyal) were both from the Minahasa region in North Sulawesi.

Tumbelaka married Neltje Zus Ticoalu and the couple had two children, Fajar Yahya Tumbelaka and Taufik Tumbelaka.

== Death ==
Broer Tumbelaka died on 20 August 1983 at Gatot Soebroto Army Hospital and was buried in the Kalibata Heroes' Cemetery.

== Bibliography ==
- Harvey, Barbara (2009). Permesta: Half a Rebellion. Equinox Publishing.
- Losa, Noberd (5 January 2015). "F.J. Tumbelaka In Memori, 5 Januari 1960" [5 January 1960: In memory of F.J. Tumbelaka, Leading Sulawesi]. Swara Manado (in Indonesian).
- Matanasi, Petrik (2015). Tukang Becak Jadi Mayor TNI [Rickshaw Driver Becomes a Major in the Indonesian National Armed Forces] (in Indonesian). Yogyakarta: Garudhawaca. ISBN 9786027949621.
- Mohamad, Goenawan (25 August 1984). "Broer" [Brother]. TEMPO (in Indonesian).
- Palohoon, Jerry (19 August 2016). "Mengenang Broer Tumbelaka Sang Pendamai" [Remembering Broer Tumbelaka, the Peacemaker]. Berita Manado (in Indonesian).
- Palohoon, Jerry (22 September 2016). "52 Tahun Provinsi Sulawesi Utara, Mengenang Broer Tumbelaka Gubernur Pertama" [52 Years of the Province of North Sulawesi, Remembering the First Governor, Broer Tumbelaka]. Berita Manado (in Indonesian).
- Palohoon, Jerry (12 May 2017). "12 Mei 1961: Puncak Prosesi Perdamaian "Pusat" dan Permesta" [12 May 1961: The Peak of the Peace Procession between the Central Government and Permesta]. Berita Manado (in Indonesian).
- Pour, Julius (2000). Baramuli Menggugat Politik Zaman [Biography of Ahmad Arnold Baramuli, an Indonesian statesman and politician] (in Indonesian). Jakarta: Pustaka Sinar Harapan. ISBN 9794166502.
- "Sejarah Propinsi Sulawesi Utara" [History of the Province of North Sulawesi] (in Indonesian). Government of North Sulawesi. Archived from the original on 19 March 2018.
- "20 Agustus 1983, Berpulangnya 'Broer' Tumbelaka, Gubernur Pertama Sulut" [20 August 1983, 'Broer' Tumbelaka, First Governor of North Sulawesi, Died]. Telegraf News (in Indonesian). 20 August 2017.
