= Amrozi =

Indonesian terrorist (1962–2008)

- Born: Ali Amrozi bin Haji Nurhasyim; 5 July 1962; Lamongan, East Java, Indonesia
- Died: 9 November 2008 (aged 46); Nusa Kambangan, Central Java, Indonesia
- Cause of death: Execution by firing squad
- Known for: Christmas Eve 2000 Indonesia bombings and 2002 Bali bombings
- Status: Executed
- Allegiance: Jemaah Islamiyah; al-Qaeda
- Conviction: Carrying out an act of terrorism
- Penalty: Death
- Accomplices: Huda bin Abdul Haq; Imam Samudra

Details
- Date apprehended: 5 November 2002

Ali Amrozi bin Haji Nurhasyim (Arabic: علي عمرازي بن حجي نورهاشم, romanized: ʿAlī ʿAmrāzī bin Ḥajī Nūr Hāshim, 5 July 1962 – 9 November 2008) was an Indonesian terrorist who was convicted and executed for his role in carrying out the Christmas Eve 2000 Indonesia bombings and 2002 Bali bombings. Amrozi was the brother of Ali Ghufron, also known as Muklas, who coordinated the bombing attack. Amrozi was executed together with Muklas and their co-conspirator, Imam Samudra.

== Early life ==
Amrozi was born in Tenggulun, Lamongan, East Java in 1962, the fifth of 13 children. Along with his brothers Muklas and Ali Imron, he attended the Al-Mukmin Islamic school founded by Abu Bakar Bashir. His family were strictly religious, following the Wahhabist school of Islam which has its roots in Saudi Arabia. Amrozi's grandfather established the first pesantren in Tenggulun. His father Nur Hasyim taught his sons that Javanese customs were considered heresy under Sharia law and were therefore to be eradicated. Nur Hasyim was involved in the Indonesian independence struggle against the Dutch, often regaling his sons with tales of heroism by his fellow Muslims.

Amrozi displayed little interest in school or religious studies. Police psychiatric reports undertaken after the Bali bombings describe him as "simple" and "shallow" and report that he was easily influenced by others. They describe him as having an immature personality and lower than normal intellectual capacity. Amrozi's brother, Ali Imron, reported that Amrozi was continually in trouble at school and at home, being banned and expelled by teachers and stealing items from his own home and selling them. He only made it to the second year of high school. At the age of 23 Amrozi married for the first time; marrying a local girl with the marriage lasting two years, producing a daughter. He attempted high school again but dropped out soon after. Seemingly without purpose and lacking direction he began vandalising Javanese graves in his village in an apparent attempt to gain approval from his strictly religious and respected father. He mortified his parents by desecrating the grave of a respected village elder, subsequently spending a week in police custody.

Amrozi's elder brother Muklas was a respected member of a pesantren in Malaysia. Amrozi had not seen him for over ten years and Muklas had, to some degree, been a stabilising influence in Amrozi's early adult years. Amrozi decided to visit Muklas but was initially shunned and rejected because of his errant ways. He was devastated by this and realised that to become accepted he needed to become a good Muslim. Amrozi ceased smoking and watching movies. He began praying five times a day in his efforts to gain the acceptance of Muklas and Muklas finally agreed to let him stay.

In the 1990s Amrozi attended the Lukman Nul Hakim pesantren where he was lectured at least once by a radical Islamic cleric, Abu Bakar Bashir, expelled from Indonesia for treason.

Amrozi was talented with his hands and became the local repairman, fixing cars and mobile phones. By trade he became a mechanic and owned the van used in the Sari Club bombing. It was Amrozi who purchased the explosives for the bombing.

== 2002 Bali bombings ==
On the evening of 12 October 2002, two bombs exploded in the Kuta tourist strip on the Indonesian island of Bali. One hit Paddy's Irish Bar, and the second exploded in a van outside the nearby Sari club. A total of 202 people died as a result. A third bomb exploded near Bali's US consulate, but no one was hurt. Upon his arrest on 5 November 2002, Amrozi admitted to playing a role in the attacks, then claimed responsibility for other bombings in Jakarta, Ambon and Mojokerto, as well as church bombings in Medan, Batam and Pekanbaru.

=== Trial ===
His two brothers Muklas and Ali Imron were also both involved. Muklas was suspected of converting Amrozi to militancy when the two were reunited in Malaysia in the late 1980s; and Muklas was later convicted of coordinating the bombing. Both of his brothers were taken into police custody, and Muklas was sentenced to the death penalty and executed with Amrozi.

Amrozi was allegedly motivated by his view of American foreign policy, which he deemed to have an imperialist agenda toward the Islamic world. He claimed in court that he was motivated to attack westerners in Kuta after learning from Australians of the decadent behaviour of white people while on holidays in Bali.

In an interview with the chief of investigations, General I Made Mangku Pastika, when asked about Amrozi's feelings toward the attack said:

There is no regret at all for him [Amrozi]. Doing his duty to God, he shows no regret. He's very calm, very cool... proud of his activities.....He doesn't regret [the fact that most of the Westerners who died were Australians rather than the Americans] but he is just unhappy.

— General I Made Mangku Pastika, Indonesian Chief of Investigations.

Amrozi's seemingly nonchalant demeanor throughout his trial earned him nicknames such as "The Smiling Assassin", "The Smiling Bomber" and "The Laughing Bomber". His brother, Ali Imron, gave damning evidence against Amrozi that proved a turning point in the case against Amrozi.

=== Sentence and execution ===
On 7 August 2003, he was found guilty for his role in carrying out the Bali bombing and sentenced to the death penalty with execution by a firing squad. His execution was delayed for five years, due to legal technicalities: the law under which he was convicted was not in effect at the time of the bombing, and it was ruled illegal by the Indonesian High Court in July 2004. Originally incarcerated in Denpasar's Kerobokan Prison, he was moved to the high-security prison island of Nusakambangan in October 2005 after a thousand protestors stormed the Denpasar prison, shouting "Kill Amrozi, kill Amrozi!" on the third anniversary of the bombing. While in prison, on 12 May 2008, he remarried his first wife, Rahma, in a ceremony which was conducted in his absence in his home village, while remaining married to his current wife.

Together with Imam Samudra and his brother, Muklas, who both received death sentences, he launched a constitutional challenge against the use of firing squads. Amrozi preferred beheading. Despite an initial decision by Muklas, Amrozi and Imam Samudra to not seek a presidential pardon, on 21 August 2006, Muklas and his co-conspirators authorised their lawyers to file a last appeal which was lodged on 7 December on the basis of retroactive legislation. On 25 September 2008, the Supreme Court of Indonesia rejected the final appeals of Imam Samudra and Mukhlas; having dismissed Amrozi's appeal earlier that month. In October 2008, he remained unrepentant and claimed revenge would be taken for his death. During the month, his final appeals were rejected and the Attorney General's office announced that he would be executed by firing squad in early November 2008.

According to a source in Indonesia's Attorney General Office, the executions were to be done before the end of Sunday, 9 November 2008. This was reportedly delayed from the original plan to allow a representative from the family to identify the body post-execution. From Amrozi's family, his younger brother, Ali Fauzi was sent as a representative of his family.

Amrozi, along with Imam Samudra and Huda bin Abdul Haq, was executed by firing squad at 00:15 on 9 November 2008. Despite his carefree demeanor throughout his trial and incarceration, The Daily Telegraph of Australia reported Amrozi was pale-faced and shaking in the moments before his execution.

== See also ==
- List of terrorist incidents in Indonesia
- Terrorism in Indonesia
- 2002 Bali bombings
- 2005 Bali bombings
- Imam Samudra
- Huda bin Abdul Haq
- Jemaah Islamiyah
- Abu Bakar Bashir
- 2003 Marriott Hotel bombing
- 2004 Australian Embassy bombing in Jakarta
