= Mukhlas =

Indonesian terrorist (1960–2008)

- Born: February 1960; Lamongan, East Java, Indonesia
- Died: 9 November 2008 (aged 48); Nusa Kambangan, Central Java, Indonesia
- Cause of death: Execution by firing squad
- Resting place: Tenggulun, Solo
- Other names: Ali Ghufron; Gufron; Muklas; Mukhlas; Huda Bin Abdul Haq
- Known for: Christmas Eve 2000 Indonesia bombings and 2002 Bali bombings
- Status: Executed
- Allegiance: Jemaah Islamiyah; al-Qaeda
- Conviction: Coordinating an act of terrorism
- Penalty: Death
- Accomplices: Amrozi bin Nurhasyim; Imam Samudra

Details
- Date apprehended: 4 December 2002

Ali Ghufron bin Haji Nurhasyim (Arabic: علي غفران بن حجي نورهاشم, romanized: ʿAlī Ghufrān bin Ḥajī Nūr Hāshim, also known as Mukhlas or Muklas; February 1960 – 9 November 2008) was an Indonesian terrorist who was convicted and executed for his role in coordinating the Christmas Eve 2000 Indonesia bombings and 2002 Bali bombings. Mukhlas was a senior and influential Jemaah Islamiyah leader with ties to Osama bin Laden.

== Early life and background ==
Different reports place Muklas' birthdate at either 2 February or 9 February 1960, in Solokuro, Lamongan, East Java. He attended the Al-Mukmin Islamic school founded by Abu Bakar Bashir with his brothers Amrozi bin Nurhasyim and Ali Imron. He recruited them to manufacture the explosives and purchase the vehicles used in the 2002 Bali bombing.

After graduating from Al-Mukmin, Muklas continued his Jihad studies at various training camps in Afghanistan. He fought in the Soviet–Afghan War between 1980 and 1989, as a member of Osama bin Laden's "International Brigade." Muklas admitted that he met with Osama bin Laden in 1987, and that; "he and other top JI personnel were careful to nurture ties to bin Laden and al-Qaeda in the years that followed." Muklas secured the funds, through senior JI member Hambali, needed to perform the 2002 Bali bombing.

== Political and religious activism ==
=== Jemaah Islamiyah ===
After the eventual defeat of the Soviet Union and installation of the Taliban as Afghanistan's rulers, Muklas returned to Southeast Asia to conduct operations for Jemaah Islamiyah. He was named head of JI's "Mantiqi One", a regional network covering Sumatra, Singapore, Malaysia and southern Thailand.

Muklas then co-founded an Islamic school in Malaysia that was used to train JI operatives.

=== Lukmanul Hakiem ===
In 1991, Muklas, at the behest of Abdullah Sungkar and Abu Bakar Bashir founded Lukmanul Hakiem, a pesantren or Islamic boarding school based on his old school at Ngruki. It was created to link up with other madrassahs and serve to recruit future jihadists. Lukmanul Hakiem employed Noordin Mohammad Top, a Malaysian national, as school principal and he used this role to recruit Muhammad Rais and others for the 2003 Marriott Hotel bombing in Jakarta.

Abu Bakar Bashir, Abdullah Sungkar, Muklas, Noordin Top, all taught at the school. JI bomb maker Azahari Husin served on the board of directors. Noordin Top was promoted to director, when Malaysian law was adjusted, however Muklas continued to operate as leader by proxy.

== 2002 Bali bombings ==
Muklas admitted to being present and in command at the planning meetings for the Bali bombings, and recruited two of his brothers to help assemble and transport the bombs used in the Bali attacks. Approximately US$35,000 was contributed to the Bali bombings by Wan Min Wan Mat, a leader of the JI network in Malaysia. This money was transferred through Hambali, Jemaah Islamiyah's head of operations. The money was provided in cash and according to claims by Muklas, the money was not just used for the bombings in Bali, but also in other attacks in Indonesia.

After acquiring al-Qaeda funds, Muklas recruited two of his brothers to handle the logistics of the bomb plot. His younger brother Amrozi, was convicted who is also situated on "death row" for his conviction in the attack, personally selected the Mitsubishi van that was to be used outside the Sari Club. Amrozi also assembled the car bomb, and backpack bomb used at Paddy's Pub, in an empty warehouse in Denpasar.

=== Capture ===
On 4 December 2002, Muklas was arrested while hiding in the Central Javanese town of Solo. He confessed to police that he was the head of one of Jemaah Islamiyah's four cells and had ordered the Bali bombings. He admitted to being present and in command at the planning meetings for the Bali bombings, and that he had recruited two of his brothers to help assemble and transport the bombs used in the attacks.

He also confessed that another Jemaah Islamiyah leader Riduan Isamuddin, (also known as Hambali), had provided the funds for the attacks. In a transcript of his police interview he explained:

I do not know for sure the source of the aforementioned money from Hambali, most probably it was from Afghanistan, that is, from Sheikh Osama bin Laden. As far as I know, Hambali did not have a source of funds except from Afghanistan.

— Muklas' confession in a police interview following his arrest.

Wan Min bin Wan Mat, a JI leader in Malaysia, later revealed to police that at Hambali's request he had given Muklas cash of approximately US$35,000 for the operation. He also asserted that the money had come directly from al-Qaeda, and that the money was not just to be used for the bombings in Bali, but also for other attacks in Indonesia. At his trial, two hundred witnesses linked Muklas with the attacks.

Speaking to documentarian Daniel Rudi Haryanto from prison, Muklas stated (translated into English by Haryanto):

Now, I'm being rested here under God's will. If sometime I'm cast away to wheresoever by government, that's Jihad Fisabillillah. And if I'm sentenced to death penalty, that's also Fisabillillah. That's my belief. Whatever will happen to us, we're entrusted to God.

=== Trial and sentence ===
His trial began on 16 June 2003. During his trial Mukhlas accuses police interrogators of torturing him into confessing a role in the attacks. He asks the court to ignore his earlier admissions of guilt. Before a panel of five Indonesian judges, on 2 October Muklas was found guilty of coordinating an act of terrorism and sentenced to death. He was the third Bali bomber to receive the death penalty after his brother Amrozi and Imam Samudra. Muklas showed no remorse during the proceedings and used his time in court to denounce George W. Bush and the United States. He declared that the terrorist atrocity was "carried out to avenge the suffering of Muslims at the hands of America and Israel." Judge Cokorda Rai Suamba summed up the trial saying:

The defendant has been legally and convincingly proven guilty of having, together with the others, planned an act of terrorism and also of being in illegal possession of explosives, We punish the defendant with the death sentence.

— Judge Cokorda Rai Suamba at the sentencing of Muklas, October 2003.

Upon hearing the sentence he immediately started screaming "Allahu Akbar" and began doing star jumps. He then hugged his lawyers and told the court the judgement was made under laws he did not believe in. Despite his professed wish to die as a martyr, he like Amrozi and Samudra appealed against the sentence.

=== Execution ===
Originally incarcerated in Denpasar's prison, he was moved to the high-security prison island of Nusakambangan in October 2005. Together with the two other bombers who received death sentences, he launched a constitutional challenge against the use of firing squads. Mukhlas preferred beheading. Despite an initial decision by Muklas, Amrozi and Imam Samudra to not seek a Presidential pardon, on 21 August 2006, Muklas and his co-conspirators authorised their lawyers to file a last appeal which was lodged on 7 December on the basis of retroactive legislation. On 25 September 2008, the Supreme Court of Indonesia rejected the final appeals of Imam Samudra and Mukhlas; having dismissed Amrozi's appeal earlier that month. In October 2008 he remained unrepentant and claimed revenge would be taken for his death. During the month, his final appeals were rejected by Indonesia's constitutional court and the Attorney General's office announced that he would be executed by firing squad in early November 2008.

According to a source in Indonesia's Attorney General Office, the executions were to be done before the end of Sunday, 9 November 2008. This was reportedly delayed from the original plan to allow a representative from the family to identify the body post-execution. From Mukhlas's family, his younger brother, Ali Fauzi were sent as a representative of his family.

Mukhlas, along with Amrozi bin Nurhasyim and Imam Samudra were executed on 00:15 on 9 November 2008.

== See also ==
- List of terrorist incidents in Indonesia
- Terrorism in Indonesia
