= Richard Poore (disambiguation) =

Richard Poore (died 1237) was an English clergyman.

Richard Poore may also refer to:

- Sir Richard Poore, 4th Baronet (1853–1930), British naval officer
- Richard B. Poore (born 1965), New Zealand television manager
