= Qudama =

Qudama or Qudamah can refer to:

- Qudama ibn Ja'far (c. 873–c. 932/948), Arab scholar and administrator
- Imam Samudra (1970–2008), also known as Qudama/Kudama, Indonesian convicted and executed for the 2002 Bali bombing

== See also ==
- Ibn Qudamah
