= List of terrorist incidents in Indonesia =

Terrorist incidents in Indonesia
Year	Number of incidents	Deaths	Injuries
2016	19	22	35
2015	28	19	17
2014	33	19	30
2013	32	23	16
2012	39	15	20
2011	21	20	70
2010	4	0	6
2009	19	15	62
2008	13	0	0
2007	2	0	1
2006	10	6	6
2005	15	66	171
2004	17	42	238
2003	18	26	166
2002	43	246	535
2001	105	134	176
2000	101	146	336
1999	61	67	91
1998	3	9	5
1997	28	102	99
1996	65	30	188
1995	24	41	51
1994	5	1	6
1993	0	0	0
1992	4	33	0
1991	7	21	60
1990	3	12	0
1989	2	85	27
1988	0	0	0
1987	0	0	0
1986	4	0	2
1985	2	7	14
1984	2	2	0
1983	0	0	0
1982	0	0	0
1981	1	4	0
1980	0	0	0
1979	0	0	0
1978	2	0	1
1977	1	1	1
1976	0	0	0
1975	0	0	0
1974	0	0	0
1973	0	0	0
1972	0	0	0
1971	0	0	0
1970	0	0	0

This is a list of incidents in Indonesia that have been labelled as "terrorism".

== 1950s ==
- 30 November 1957: Assassination attempt on President Sukarno—a bomb attack in Perguruan Cikini, Central Jakarta.

== 1970s ==
- 11 November 1976: Bomb attack in Nurul Iman Mosque, Padang, West Sumatra. According to government officials, the suspect was Timzar Zubil, the leader of Komando Jihad. However, Timzar remains missing.
- 20 March 1978: Attacks in various places in Jakarta using molotov bombs, as well as the burning of a taxi. The suspected motive of the attacks was to disturb the General Session of the People's Consultative Assembly.
- 14 April 1978: TNT attack on Istiqlal Mosque, Jakarta. The case remains unsolved.

== 1980s ==
- 28 March 1981: Garuda Indonesia Flight 206 – a DC-9 aircraft on a domestic flight, was hijacked. Five Komando Jihad extremists hijacked the DC-9 "Woyla"—en route from Palembang, South Sumatra to Medan, North Sumatra—and ordered the aircraft crew to fly to Colombo, Sri Lanka. Due to a lack of fuel, the aircraft refueled at Penang, Malaysia and at Don Muang, Thailand. The hijackers demanded US$1.5 million, the release of 80 Komando Jihad members imprisoned in Indonesia, and an aircraft to transport them to an unspecified destination. The hostage rescue operation was carried out by the Indonesian Army's Kopassus. Casualties included the deaths of the pilot, one Kopassus commando, and three hijackers. The two other hijackers were killed by Kopassus commandos on the plane returning to Jakarta. All hostages were released unharmed.
- 4 October 1984: Bomb attack in Bank Central Asia in Jalan Pecenongan, West Jakarta in retaliation for the Tanjung Priok massacre earlier that year. The suspect, Muhammad Jayadi, was a member of Gerakan Pemuda Ka'bah (the youth organization wing of Partai Persatuan Pembangunan) and was sentenced to 15 years in prison.
- 24 December 1984: Bomb attack on the Seminari Alkitab Asia Tenggara building in Jalan Margono, Malang, East Java. The case remains unsolved.
- 21 January 1985: 1985 Borobudur bombing – Borobudur Buddhist temple in Magelang, Central Java was attacked with nine bombs. The attack caused no casualties, but nine stupas on the upper rounded terraces of Arupadhatu were badly damaged. Husein Ali Al Habsyie, a blind Muslim preacher, was sentenced to life imprisonment for masterminding the attack.
- 16 March 1985: Bomb attack in a Pemudi Express Bus in Banyuwangi, East Java. Abdulkadir Al Hasby was arrested. The attack was connected with the Borobudur bombing and was motivated by the Tanjung Priok massacre. It was suggested that the bomb was accidentally detonated during transport to its intended target, Kuta Beach in Bali.
- May 1986: The Japanese Red Army, a Japanese militant communist organization, fired mortar rounds at the embassies of Japan, Canada and the United States in Jakarta.

== 1990s ==
- 13 September 1997: Bomb attack in Mranggen, Demak, Central Java. The attack was planned by three pro-independence East Timorese youth, but the bomb exploded accidentally. Xanana Gusmão, the future president of East Timor, claimed responsibility for the attack, but the suspects escaped.
- 18 January 1998: A bomb accidentally exploded in the Tanah Tinggi flat in Central Jakarta. Agus Priyono, a member of Solidaritas Mahasiswa Indonesia untuk Demokrasi (SMID), a Partai Rakyat Demokratik (People's Democratic Party) organization, was jailed for seven months for failing to report his knowledge of the planned attack to relevant authorities.
- 11 December 1998: Bomb attack on Atrium Plaza Senen shopping center in Central Jakarta.
- 19 April 1999: Bomb attack on Istiqlal Mosque, Jakarta. Eddy Ranto (alias Umar) was accused in addition to previously committed crimes: the robbery of Bank BCA Taman Sari in Jakarta and a bombing in Hayam Wuruk, Jakarta.

== 2000s ==
- 28 May 2000: 2000 Walisongo school massacre – Christian militants invaded the Muslim village of Sintuwu Lemba in Central Sulawesi. The militants killed a reported 191 villagers for up to two days using guns and machetes. Many victims were led into the jungle before being murdered. A number of others were killed inside the village school. Terrorists raped female victims before killing them.
- 1 August 2000: Philippine consulate bombing in Jakarta – A bomb was detonated outside the official residence of the Philippine Ambassador to Indonesia, Leonides Caday, in Menteng, Jakarta. The bomb killed two and injured 21 others.
- 14 September 2000: Jakarta Stock Exchange bombing – A car bomb exploded in the basement of the Jakarta Stock Exchange, triggering a chain of explosions in which multiple cars caught fire. Most of those who died were drivers waiting by their employers' cars.
- 24 December 2000: Christmas Eve 2000 Indonesia bombings – Christmas Eve in 2000, a series of explosions occurred in Indonesia as part of a large-scale Islamic terrorist attack by al-Qaeda and Jemaah Islamiyah. The attack involved a series of coordinated bombings of churches in Jakarta, Pekanbaru, Medan, Bandung, Batam Island, Mojokerto, Mataram, and Sukabumi. The bombings killed 18 people and injured many others.
- 12 October 2002: 2002 Bali bombings – Coordinated bomb attacks occurred on in the tourist district of Kuta, Bali. The attack was the deadliest act of terrorism in the history of Indonesia, killing 202 people, including 88 Australian citizens and 38 Indonesian citizens. A further 240 people were injured. Various members of Jemaah Islamiyah, a violent Islamist group, were convicted in relation to the bombings, including three individuals who were sentenced to death.
- 5 December 2002: 2002 Makassar bombing – A bomb exploded within a McDonald's restaurant in Makassar, South Sulawesi. The attack were conducted by the Islamic group Laskar Jundullah, which caused death to 3 people, including the bomber himself, and injured 15 others.
- 5 August 2003: 2003 Marriott Hotel bombing – A suicide bomber detonated a car bomb outside the lobby of the JW Marriott Hotel in Mega Kuningan, South Jakarta, killing 12 people and injuring 150. All those killed were Indonesian citizens with the exception of one Dutch businessman, one Danish citizen, and two Chinese tourists.
- 31 December 2003: 2003 Aceh New Year's Eve bombing – A bombing occurred during a concert at a night market in Peureulak, Aceh, Sumatra, killing at least ten people, including three children. 45 others were wounded. The military blamed Free Aceh Movement (GAM) for the attack.
- 9 September 2004: Australian Embassy bombing in Jakarta – A one-tonne car bomb, packed into a small delivery van, exploded outside the Australian embassy in Kuningan District, South Jakarta, at about 10:30 a.m. local time (03:30 UTC), killing nine people (including the suicide bomber) and wounding over 150 others. Jemaah Islamiyah claimed responsibility for the attack.
- 13 November 2004: 2004 Poso bus bombing – An improvised explosive device planted in a bus exploded in Poso, Central Sulawesi, killing six people and injuring three others.
- 28 May 2005: 2005 Tentena market bombings – Two IEDs, set to explode 15 minutes apart, detonated during the morning at a market in the center of Tentena, Central Sulawesi, killing 22 people and wounding at least 40 others.
- 1 October 2005: 2005 Bali bombings – A series of suicide bombs exploded at two sites at Jimbaran Beach Resort, Bali and in Kuta, Bali. The attack killed 20 and injured over 100 others. The three bombers also died in the attacks.
- 31 December 2005: 2005 Palu market bombing – An IED detonated in a butcher's market in Palu, Central Sulawesi, killing eight and wounding 53.
- 17 July 2009: 2009 Jakarta bombings – The JW Marriott and Ritz-Carlton hotels in Jakarta were hit by separate suicide bombings five minutes apart. Of the seven victims killed, three were Australian citizens, two were Dutch citizens, one was a New Zealand citizen, and one was an Indonesian citizen. More than 50 people were injured in the blasts.

== 2010s ==
- 15 March 2011: A package of explosive devices hidden in a book was delivered to Ulil Abshar Abdalla, an activist of Jaringan Islam Liberal (Islamic Liberal Network) in the Komunitas Utan Kayu complex near the KBR68H Radio station in Utan Kayu, East Jakarta. The note enclosed within the book requested Abdalla to write a foreword for the upcoming book to be published. The Institut Studi Arus Informasi (ISAI) receptionist found the package suspicious and called for help from the Gegana (anti-bomb squad). There were no casualties. However, before the Gegana squad arrived, the bomb exploded and severed the arm of a police officer trying to defuse the device.
- 15 April 2011: 2011 Cirebon bombing – A suicide bomber detonated an explosive device in a mosque during Friday prayer in a police compound in Cirebon, West Java. The bomber was killed and at least 28 people were injured.
- 25 September 2011: A suicide bomber exploded in Full Gospel Bethel Church in Kepunton, Solo, Central Java. The blast killed the bomber and injured 14 people.
- 8 April 2012: A Trigana Air PK-YRF airplane was shot by unidentified gunmen during its landing approach to Mulia airstrip in Puncak Jaya, Papua at 8:21 a.m. A 35-year-old Papua Post journalist, Kogoya, was killed in the shooting.
- 17 August 2012: Two policemen guarding a Lebaran (Eid al-Fitr) traffic post in Solo, Central Java, were shot by gunmen on motorcycles at 1:10 a.m. The two policemen were injured.
- 16 October 2012: Police discovered the corpses of two murdered policemen who had gone missing three days earlier in Tamanjeka village, Poso Regency, Central Sulawesi. The victims were the heads of the Police Unit Intelligence of the Poso Pesisir sector, Brigadir Sudirman, and of the Poso Police Resort Assault Unit, Brigadir Satu Andi Sapa. They had gone missing while investigating suspected terrorist training grounds in a forest in Poso Regency.
- 27 November 2012: Three policemen stationed in remote Pirime police post in Jayawijaya, Papua, were killed in an attack by a group of unidentified men. Police suspected the Papua separatist movement was behind the attack.
- 13 October 2015: Members of the Aceh Singkil Islamic Care Youth Students Association (PPI), arrived in Suka Makmue, Dangguran district and Aceh Singkil Regency in several trucks. The attackers set fire in three churches and the most serious incident occurred Dangguran where an assailant was killed and four others (a police officer and three assailants), were wounded in the ensuing clash trying to protect a church that guarded worshippers.
- 14 January 2016: 2016 Jakarta attacks – Four civilians were killed when militants detonated explosives in or near a Burger King restaurant in Central Jakarta. The attackers then destroyed a nearby police post with grenades. Gunfire ensued when police arrived shortly afterwards.
- 13 November 2016: 2016 Samarinda church bombing – A terrorist detonated a Molotov bomb in front of Oikumene Church in Samarinda Seberang, Samarinda, East Kalimantan, where children were playing. At least one toddler was killed in the incident and three other toddlers were injured.
- 24 May 2017: 2017 Jakarta bombings – Two suicide bombings near the Kampung Melayu bus terminal in East Jakarta. At least five were killed, including three policemen and two militants. Ten people were injured, some seriously.
- 25 June 2017: Two perpetrators stabbed a police officer to death at his post in Medan, North Sumatra. Other officers soon responded and killed one assailant while arresting another.
- 30 June 2017: An assailant reportedly attacked two police officers at a mosque near the National Police headquarters in South Jakarta.
- 9 May 2018: 2018 Mako Brimob standoff – Terrorism inmates in a detention center staged a riot, resulting in the death of five police officers and one inmate. The detention center was heavily guarded by elite counter-terrorism officers and served as the local headquarters of the Mobile Brigade Corps, a paramilitary unit of the National Police.
- 13 May 2018: Surabaya bombings – Suicide bombers, including a mother and her two children, bombed three churches in Surabaya, killing 15 civilians and injuring 57 others. The same night, a bomb shook an apartment complex in Sidoarjo, killing at least three of the same family.
- 14 May 2018: Suicide bomb in the police gate of Surabaya. Four policemen and six civilians were wounded in the attack. Four suicide bombers were also killed.
- 16 May 2018: A police station in Pekanbaru, Riau was attacked by five individuals armed with swords. One attacker drove off after hitting and killing a police officer with the car. Four others attacked using swords and injured two police officers. Four of the attackers were later killed when the driver was captured by police.
- 10 October 2019: Chief security minister Wiranto was stabbed by an assailant using a sharp weapon during a working visit to Menes, Pandeglang, Banten Province. A local police chief was also stabbed in the back. Following the incident, the Banten Police had arrested the perpetrators; one man and one woman. The perpetrators had allegedly been exposed to radical teachings and also an alleged Islamic State member that led them to perform the attack.
- 13 November 2019: 2019 Medan suicide bombing – A suicide bombing at Medan Police HQ wounded four police officers, a part-time worker and a civilian. The bomber, a man in his 20s, died in the explosion.

== 2020s ==
- 28 November 2020: A terrorist attack by Islamists against Christians in Sulawesi resulted in 4 people killed, two of whom beheaded and two of burned.
- 28 March 2021: 2021 Makassar cathedral bombing – Two suicide bombers attacked Sacred Heart Cathedral, Makassar during Palm Sunday service. At least 20 people were injured. The attack was allegedly carried out by the ISIL-linked group Jamaah Ansharut Daulah.
- 31 March 2021: Indonesian National Police headquarters shooting – A woman opened fire against the National Police headquarters, before being shot dead by responding officers. No other casualties were reported.
- 25 October 2022: Istana Negara attempted shooting – A female assailant trespassed the Istana Negara security layer and attempted to shoot the President and/or Presidential Guard using an FN Five-seven. President of Indonesia Joko Widodo was not in the Istana Negara at the time of attack as he was visiting East Kalimantan and Nusantara. The assailant was apprehended immediately by the Presidential Guard (Paspampres) and Indonesian National Police on the scene and is currently detained at Metro Jaya Region Police HQ.
- 7 December 2022: Astana Anyar bombing – at around 8:20 AM Western Indonesia Time (UTC+7), a suicide bombing incident occurred at an Indonesian National Police station in Astana Anyar district, Bandung, West Java. The attacker and one police officer were killed by the explosion, while 11 people were injured including 3 police officers. Identity of the perpetrator and his affiliation subsequently released by the Police 6 hours after the attack. Police General Listyo Sigit Prabowo, Chief of the Indonesian National Police, released that the perpetrator was affiliated to the Jamaah Ansharut Daulah Bandung branch.
- 7 November 2025: Jakarta school bombing, a 17-year-old student detonated a series of bombs at SMAN 72 school in Jakarta, resulting in no deaths, but 97 injuries - including the perpetrator. The perpetrator was inspired by right-wing-extremist attacks, notably the 2019 Christchurch mosque massacres.

== Incidents outside Indonesia ==
- 21 March 2012: A bomb exploded outside the Indonesian embassy in Paris, France. The explosion broke windows but caused no casualties.
