= Masykur Abdul Kadir =

Masykur Abdul Kadir is a former felon who was sentenced to 15 years in an Indonesian prison for his role in the 2002 Bali bombings. Kadir's conviction was a precedent setting court case for Indonesian law, as he was arrested and imprisoned on the basis of a law that was passed after he had violated it. He was released from prison in 2010.

== Biography ==
Kadir was born on the island of Bali, Indonesia. He later moved to Denpasar, where he claimed he worked as a tour guide. In the early 2000s he became involved with Jemaah Islamiyah, an Islamic terror cell that operated in Indonesia. Kadir was described as the group's "local boy" on Bali; he met with members of the group twice, renting an apartment from them, hiring a car for members of the group, and personally driving members of the group to locations — which later became targets for terror attacks — in southern Bali. How much Kadir actually knew about the terror cell is in dispute, but the Indonesian government claimed that he helped the group scout locations for future terrorist attacks.

On 12 October 2002, a series of bombs were detonated in Bali and Denpasar, killing 202 people in total. In the aftermath of the attack, the Indonesian government began a crackdown on terrorist activity inside the country; several members and affiliates of Jemaah Islamiyah were arrested, including Kadir. Kadir was proven to have met with three members of the terror group in the immediate aftermath of the blast, and was subsequently put on trial for aiding in an act of terrorism. Kadir claimed that he was a tour guide, and that his clients "Just happened to be" the bombers. No evidence was presented connecting Kadir to the assembly of the bombs used in the attack, and as such he was sentenced to 15 years in prison under Article 13(a) of Law No 15.

After being sentenced, Kadir and his lawyers appealed his conviction and questioned the constitutionality of the ruling; this objection was raised as Article 13(a) (which had been passed in the immediate aftermath of the Bali bombings) had not yet been formulated when Kadir was arrested, and thus he was being charged for committing an act that was not yet illegal when he committed said act. Kadir won his appeal, and the matter was brought before the Constitutional Court of Indonesia. The court found by a margin of five to four that trying terrorist suspects under retroactive laws violated the Indonesian constitution (specifically Article 28(1)), but the court also noted that, as the Constitutional Court's decision itself could not operate retrospectively, Kadir would remain in prison to serve out his sentence.

Kadir was released from prison in 2010 after serving 7 years of his 15-year sentence. In the years after his release, he took part in meetings between former terrorists and victims of terror attacks, adding that he hoped such meetings would aid in the healing process.
