= Nusa Kambangan =

Prison island in Indonesia

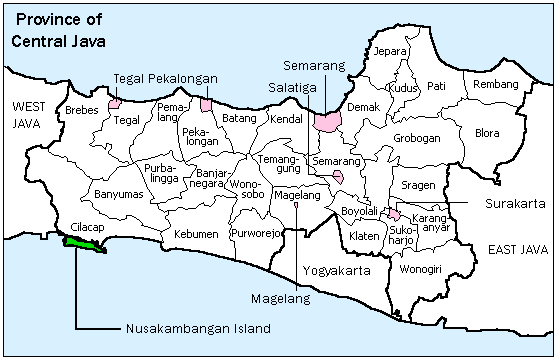
- Location of Nusa Kambangan (green) in Central Java

- Location within Java Location within Indonesia

Geography
- Location: Southeast Asia
- Coordinates: 7°45′S 108°55′E
- Area: 121 km^{2} (47 sq mi)

Administration
- Indonesia
- Province: Central Java
- Regency: Cilacap

Demographics
- Population: Around 3000 natives, and several hundred inmates
- Pop. density: 24/km^{2} (62/sq mi)
- Ethnic groups: Banyumasan people

Additional information
- Time zone: IWST (UTC+07:00)

Nusa Kambangan (Note: Also known as Nusakambangan, Kambangan island, or Nusa Kambangan Island) is an island located in Indonesia, separated by a narrow strait from the south coast of Java. The closest port is Cilacap in Central Java province. It is known as the place where the fabled wijayakusuma, which translates as the 'flower of victory' in the highest literary register of the Javanese language, grows. The wijayakusuma can be used to bring a person back from the dead, and the princes of the Sultanate of Mataram and later the Surakarta Sunanate sent to the island for the blooms in order to become kings. Thus the island is also known as pulau bunga-bungaan, the 'island of many flowers'. There is a forest reserve on the island. One of the main cultural events is Sedekah Laut (sea sacrifice), which is held by the Surakarta Sunanate every Satu Suro (new year) in the Javanese calendar. Since the Dutch colonial period, there have been a number of supermax prisons on the island, some of which are still operational and run by the Ministry of Immigration and Correction.

== History ==
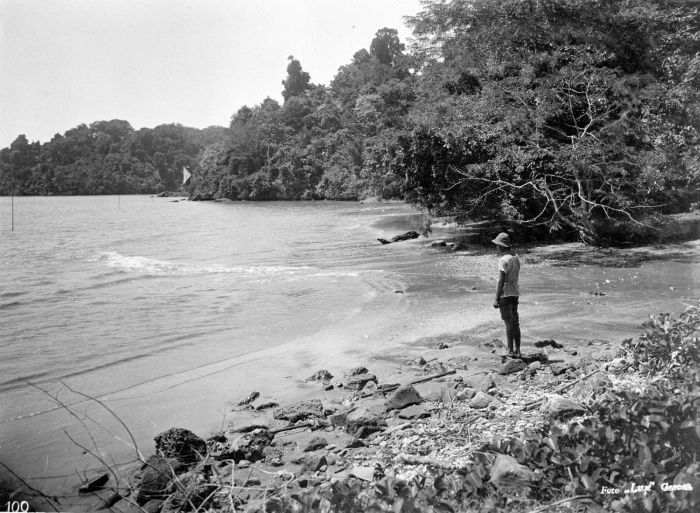
The south coast of Noesa Kambangan, c. 1920–1940

The island was declared off-limits in 1905 by the Dutch, who turned it into a prison island during the era of Dutch rule. The colonial government built prisons on the island for criminals. The prison on Nusa Kambangan was opened in the mid-1920s by Indonesia's Dutch colonial rulers.

Its use as a prison island continued after independence. During the rule of president Suharto, hundreds of political dissidents were imprisoned on the island. Most were political prisoners, members of the banned Communist Party of Indonesia or sympathizers. These prisoners were never brought to trial, and many of them died from hunger or illness.

In 1996, the island was opened to the public as a tourist destination.

The island has also been involved in refugee handling. About 140 Afghan refugees were detained on the island after their boat, which was en route to Christmas Island, Australia, sank in rough seas on 17 August 2001. However, more than 90 of these refugees would later escape on 19 September 2001, sailing away in small fishing boats and are believed to have headed for Australia.

The island was affected by the 2006 Pangandaran earthquake and tsunami, when a 7.7-magnitude undersea earthquake occurred off the coast of west Java. At least 11 villagers disappeared and eight people were killed in the ensuing tsunami, two of which were prisoners at one of the Permisan prisons. At least 15 inmates on Nusa Kambangan were also missing.

== Demographics ==
The island population is 3,000, excluding the prison inmates and staff; most inhabitants are Javanese. Their main occupation is fishery and some work in rubber and teak plantations. However, illegal logging activities, mostly conducted by outsiders, threaten the island environment.

== Geography, flora and fauna ==
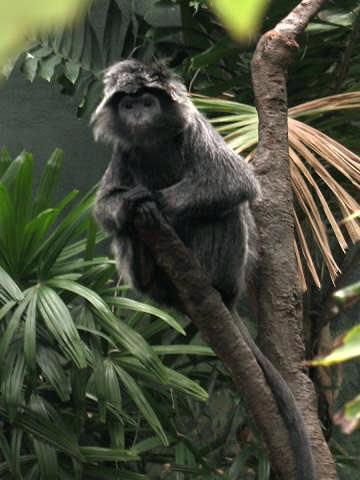
Javan lutung, one of the primates found in Nusakambangan

Nusa Kambangan is separated from Java by the narrow Segara Anakan strait. Being isolated from mainland Java, the island is relatively under-developed and less inhabited and the wildlife is better preserved. The eastern side of a bay is a nature reserve area where an old Dutch fortress is located on the Karangbandung beach. As a lowland tropical rainforest, Nusakambangan is biologically diverse.

More than 71 different bird species, 14 reptile species and various mammal species are found in the island. Twenty-three bird species are classified as protected, including the Pacific reef heron (Egretta sacra), woolly-necked stork (Ciconia episcopus), lesser adjutant (Leptoptilos javanicus), white-bellied sea eagle (Haliaeetus leucogaster), brahminy kite (Haliastur indus), and crested serpent eagle (Spilornis cheela). Several other protected mammal species include the leopard (Panthera pardus), Indian muntjac (Muntiacus muntjak) and chevrotain (Tragulus javanicus). Four of six native primates in Java, namely Javan lutung (Trachypithecus auratus), the crab-eating macaque (Macaca fascicularis), Javan surili (Presbytis comata), and slow lorises (Nycticebus sp.), have been reported to live on the island.

Saltwater crocodiles (Crocodylus porosus) are native to the surrounding mangroves and were historically common, but their current status is unknown. Sightings in May 2019 suggest small numbers may persist, although these individuals may have moved in from elsewhere.

In 2015 40 percent of Nusa Kambangan was spoiled by illegal logging and land clearing for plantations. Most of it had occurred in Selokjero, Bantapanjang, Kalijati, Jengkolan, Jongorasu, and Karanglena.

== Tourism ==
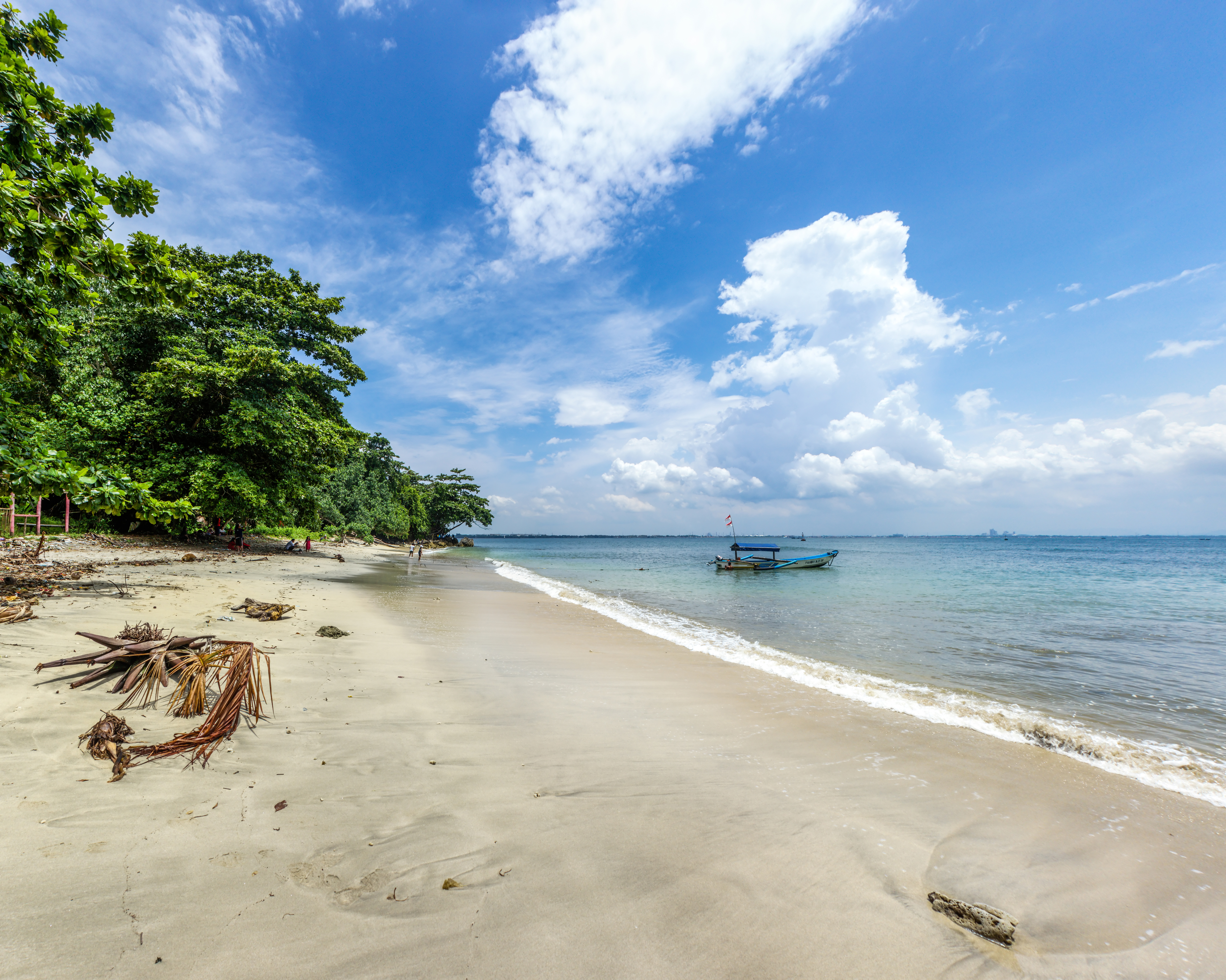
The eastern edge of Karang Bolong Beach, Nusa Kambangan

From the mid-1990s, the island was intermittently promoted by local authorities as a tourist destination, primarily for its caves, beaches, and unusual wildlife that is extinct on Java.

Notable attractions include Permisan beach (Pantai Permisan) with its beautiful white and gray sands near the Permisan jail lighthouse, Ranca Babakan on the west coast of the island, White Sands beach (Pantai Pasir Putih), and several caves such as Queen's cave (Goa Ratu). According to the Cilacap Tourism Office, Nusa Kambangan was opened as a tourist destination following an agreement between the Central Java Governor and Ministry of Justice in 1996. The Cilacap government then invested some Rp 1.7 billion (around $200,000) in preparations for the opening up of the island, most of which was used on the construction of tourist-related infrastructure. A special agency was also established to manage tourism on the island, with the Nusakambangan Prison warden made head of the agency and Cilacap Tourism Office chief as the deputy. No individual tourists are allowed, all of the tourists within a group of minimum 15 persons which is arranged by tourist agency then will be accompanied by security officers until maximum 6 p.m without overnight stay.

== Prisons ==
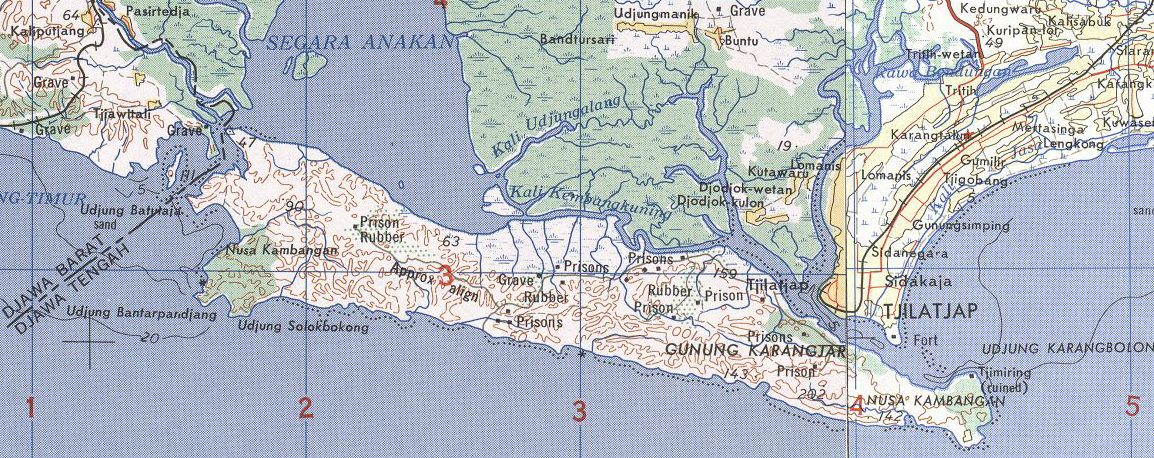
Detailed map of Nusakambangan, circa 1950, (made by US Army Map Service)

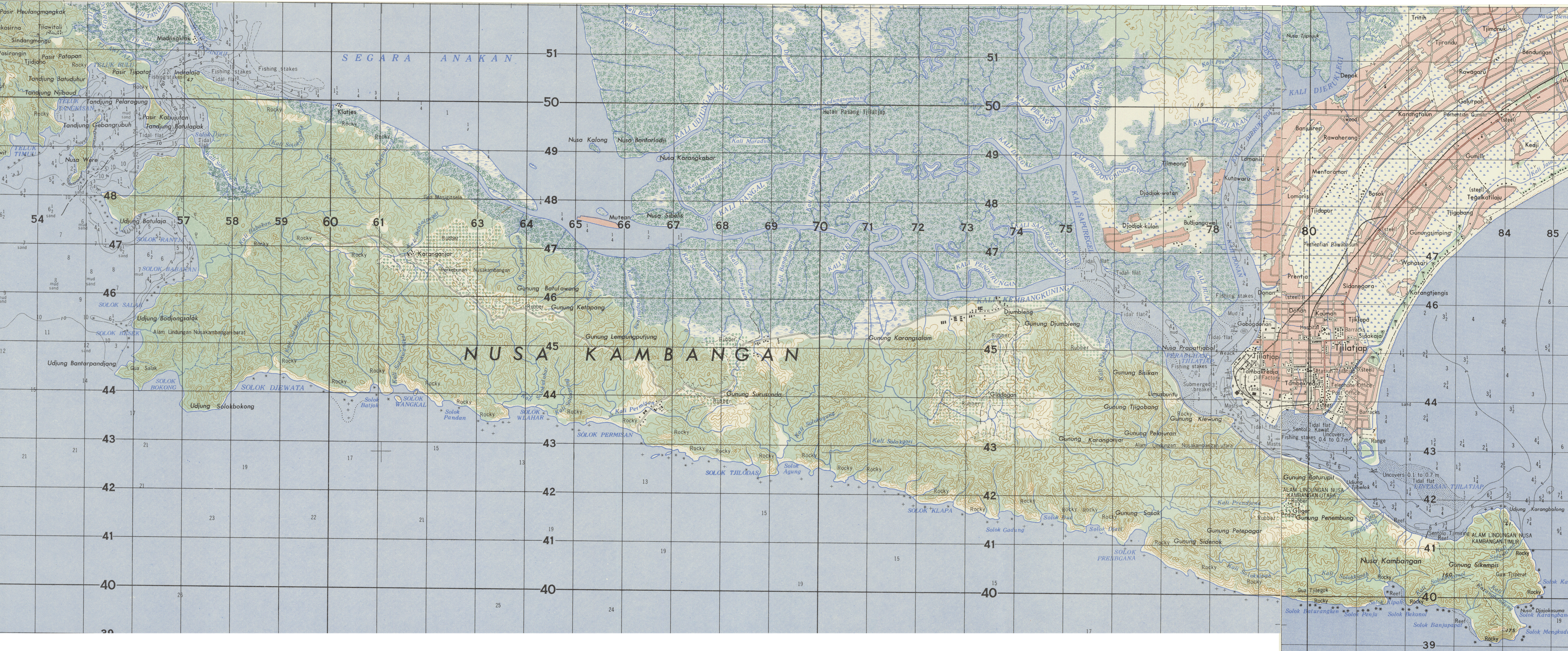
1:50,000 map of Nusa Kambangan (series T725, sheets 4719-I & 4819-IV, 1966)

There are nine prisons built in the island, four of which are still used:

- Permisan prison, built in 1908,
- Batu prison, built in 1925,
- Besi prison, built in 1929,
- Kembangkuning prison, built in 1950.

There are also five inactive prisons:

- Nirbaya prison, built in 1912,
- Karanganyar prison, built in 1912,
- Karangtengah prison, built in 1928,
- Gliger prison, built in 1929,
- Limusbuntu prison, built in 1935.

Several new prisons were subsequently built to meet capacity needs. Currently, Nusakambangan has a total of 17 prisons, with 12 in use and five unused. Some of these new prisons include:

- Kumbang prison
- Karanganyar prison (new)
- Nirbaya prison (new)
- Open prison
- Gladakan prison
- Ngaseman prison
- Besi prison
- Narchotics prison

It was sensationally called "Alcatraz of Indonesia" in one news article by an American journalist, while another American titled his piece "Execution Island".

All of these were built by the Dutch, except Kembangkuning prison, which was built after independence. Of these, Batu (literally "stone") prison is considered the most famous.

=== Notable inmates ===
Famous people imprisoned on the island include:

- Pramoedya Ananta Toer, poet and novelist, jailed on the island July – August 1969 as political prisoner.
- Bob Hasan, former Minister of Forestry, convicted of corruption charges.
- Amrozi, Imam Samudra, and Ali Gufron, three men convicted of organising the 2002 Bali bombings. They were executed there by firing squad on 9 November 2008.
- Tommy Suharto, son of former president Suharto, convicted of masterminding the murder of the judge who sentenced him for corruption.
- Fabianus Tibo, Dominggus da Silva, and Marianus Riwu, three men convicted as provocateurs and mastermind of a deadly riot in Central Sulawesi; they have been executed there.
- Australians Andrew Chan and Myuran Sukumaran, the ringleaders of the Bali Nine group were arrested at Denpasar airport in 2005 for drug trafficking and sentenced in 2006 to execution by firing squad. They were executed by firing squad on 29 April 2015.
- Brazilian Rodrigo Gularte, convicted as drug smuggler. He was executed by firing squad on 29 April 2015.
- Filipina Mary Jane Veloso, arrested and sentenced to death, convicted of smuggling 2.6 kilograms (5.7 pounds) of heroin into Indonesia. Released December 2024.
- American Frank Amado, convicted for drug trafficking, under a death sentence and at Kembangkuning Prison. Released July 2021.

Nusa Kambangan has also held hundreds of members of Free Aceh Movement, but they were later released as part of a peace deal.

244 inmates convicted in various drugs and narcotics offences were transported to the new Super Maximum Security Prison in Nusa Kambangan in 2007. These inmates came from various prisons in the country. The moving is intended to isolate them and cut drug circulation in Indonesia.

=== Executions ===
On 9 November 2008, Amrozi, Imam Samudra, and Mukhlas, three men convicted for their roles in the 2002 Bali bombings were executed by firing squad at Nusa Kambangan after their appeals for clemency were turned down.

In late 2014, the government of the new President Joko Widodo announced that the execution of persons convicted of drug-related offences would be resumed. Appeals for clemency from six convicted drug dealers were turned down. The resumption of executions attracted considerable international publicity. Shortly after midnight on 18 January 2015, five convicted persons were executed by firing squad at Nusa Kambangan and another person convicted of drug dealing was executed, at the same time, in a separate prison in Boyolali in Central Java. Two of the prisoners were members of the Bali Nine gang, Andrew Chan and Mayuran Sukumaran. The Dutch and Brazilian governments announced that their ambassadors to Indonesia would be temporarily withdrawn in protest since Dutch and Brazilian nationals were amongst the executed.
