= 2005 Bali bombings =

Terrorist attacks in Indonesia

Coordinates: 8.3692°S 115.1383°E

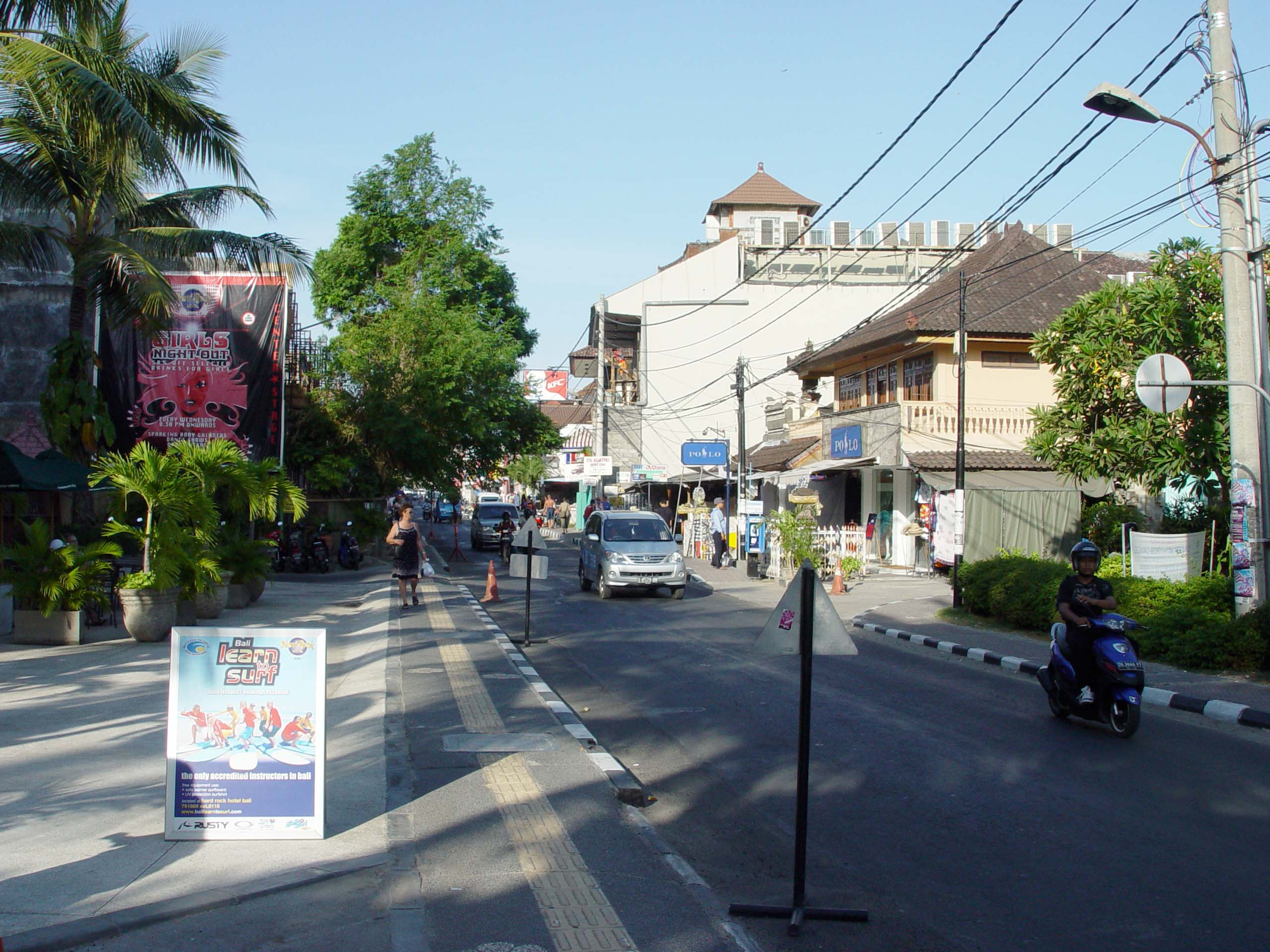
- Central Kuta, near the attack
- Location: Bali, Indonesia
- Date: 1 October 2005; 21 years ago 6:50 p.m. – around 7:00 p.m. (UTC+8)
- Target: Main square in central Kuta, warungs along the Jimbaran beach
- Attack type: Suicide bombings; terrorist attack
- Deaths: 23 (including 3 perpetrators)
- Injuries: 129
- Perpetrator: Jemaah Islamiyah

Terrorist attacks occurred on 1 October 2005 in Bali, Indonesia. Bombs were detonated at two sites in Jimbaran Beach resort and in Kuta 30 km (19 mi) away, both in south Bali. The attacks killed 20 people and injured more than 100 others.

== Explosions ==
The Indonesian national news agency, ANTARA, reported that the first two explosions occurred at 6:50 p.m. local time, near a Jimbaran food court and the third at 7:00 pm. in Kuta Town Square. Other reports claim that the blasts occurred at around 7:15 p.m. At least 3 blasts were reported.

One of the blasts struck Raja's Restaurant at the Kuta Square shopping mall in central Kuta. Another two bombs exploded at warungs along the Jimbaran beach, one of which was near the Four Seasons Hotel. These areas are generally popular with Western tourists. Police later said they had found three unexploded bombs in Jimbaran. They had apparently failed to go off after the security forces hastily shut down the island's mobile telephone network following the first blasts.

According to Indonesia's head of counter-terrorism, Major General Ansyaad Mbai, early evidence indicates that the attacks were carried out by at least three suicide bombers in a similar fashion to the 2002 bombings. The remnants of backpacks and excessively mutilated bodies are believed to be evidence of suicide bombings. There remains also a possibility that backpacks were hidden inside the target restaurants before detonation. Australian Federal Police Commissioner Mick Keelty said that the bombs used appear to have differed from previous blasts in that most deaths and injuries had been inflicted by shrapnel, rather than chemical explosion. A medical officer's x-rays showed foreign objects described as "pellets" in many victims' bodies and a victim reported ball bearings lodged in her back.

The bombings occurred the same day that Indonesia cut its fuel subsidies resulting in gas prices rising by 675% and just two days before the start of the Muslim holy month of Ramadan and 11 days before the third anniversary of the 2002 Bali bombings. The attack came during the school holiday period in some states of Australia, when an estimated 7,500 Australians are believed to have been visiting Bali.

== Casualties ==
Bali bombings on 1 October 2005
Nationality	Deaths	Injured	Sources
Indonesia	15	68	
Australia	4	19	
Japan	1	4	
South Korea	–	8	
United States	–	6	
Canada	–	3	
United Kingdom	–	1	
Unknown	–	20	
Total	20^{*}	129	
^{*} Excludes the 3 suicide bombers

The latest report cites 20 dead and between 101 and 129 injured. Some earlier reports put the number of fatalities at between 26 and 36 people, but those figures have since been lowered. Among those killed were 15 Indonesians, 4 Australians, and a Japanese national, not counting the 3 assassins. The wounded included many Indonesians, mostly Hindus while the rest were 19 Australians, 8 South Koreans, 6 Americans, 4 Japanese, 3 Canadians and 1 Briton. Most of the casualties were sent to Bali's Sanglah General Hospital, and mostly treated for injuries caused by broken glass. Others were sent to Griya Asih Hospital. As in the 2002 bombings, some of the injured, primarily foreign nationals, were evacuated to medical facilities in Australia and Singapore. The less seriously injured were evacuated to Singapore, while other casualties, among them Australians, Japanese and an Indonesian, were evacuated to treatment in Darwin, Australia aboard a Royal Australian Air Force C-130 Hercules.

Following the 2002 Bali bombings, in which more Australians than any other nationals were killed and injured, and the 2004 bombing of Australia's Embassy in Jakarta, the latest attacks received extensive coverage in Australia and were denounced by some officials, such as Federal Opposition Leader Kim Beazley, as an attack on Australians.

== Prior warnings ==
Indonesian authorities were expecting such an event, after the Indonesian president warned of more bombings within the country, and the Australian Department of Foreign Affairs (DFAT) had issued warnings two days before the event. However, the Australian government claimed that it received no specific prior warning of a terrorist attack being imminent in Bali. Minister Downer also played down any knowledge of specific signs of the potential event, despite the DFAT warning on the last day of September. DFAT warned Australians against non-essential travel to Indonesia since before the 2002 attacks – a warning still in effect. The department advises travellers against congregating in areas popular with Western tourists.

In May 2005, the US State Department issued a travel warning against non-essential trips to Indonesia. The travel warning was last updated 9 January 2007.

A Philippine security official said that for months intelligence officials in Southeast Asia had received information that Jemaah Islamiyah was orchestrating a major strike, possibly in the Philippines or Indonesia, but were unable to uncover the plot's details in time to prevent it.

== Suspects ==
The attacks bear the hallmarks of the active terrorist network Jemaah Islamiah (JI), which is believed to be responsible for several bombings in Indonesia, including the Philippine consulate bombing in Jakarta, the Jakarta Stock Exchange bombing, the Christmas Eve 2000 Indonesia bombings, the 2002 Bali nightclub bombing, the 2002 Makassar bombing, the 2003 Marriott Hotel bombing, the 2004 Australian Embassy bombing, the 2005 Palu market bombing and the 2009 Jakarta bombings. Rohan Gunaratna, head of terrorism research at Singapore's Institute of Defence and Strategic Studies, told Agence France-Presse that "The only group that has the intention and capability to mount a coordinated and simultaneous attack against a western target in Indonesia is Jemaah Islamiyah."

Although a link to JI has not been confirmed, the bombings were quickly condemned as terrorist attacks by the authorities. Police Major General Ansyaad Mbai, a top Indonesian anti-terrorism official, told the Associated Press that the bombings "were clearly the work of terrorists". Major General Mbai identified Malaysian men, already wanted in connection to previous bombings in Indonesia, as the suspected masterminds of the attacks. The chief suspect was Azahari Husin, a member of JI who was an engineering expert and former academic with a doctorate from University of Reading (late 1980s). Husin was nicknamed the "Demolition Man" and was thought to have collaborated with the second suspect: Noordin Mohammed Top, a bomb maker whose wife was sentenced to three years in prison for harbouring him. Azahari was killed in a police raid on 9 November 2005 at Batu, East Java, while Noordin "has been killed after a lengthy and violent siege, Indonesia's police chief said" by "heavily armed counter-terrorism police" on 17 September 2009 at Surakarta, Central Java.

Motivations for the bombings remain unclear. Some, such as the Australian Prime Minister, have suggested the attacks were intended to undermine Indonesia's moderate democratic government. Moreover, media organisations have suggested that the attack was planned to correspond with massive fuel price increases in Indonesia, so as to maximise economic and political damage. On the contrary, Sidney Jones, of the International Crisis Group, believes that it was not an attempt to undermine democracy "per se", but rather an example of jihadist extremism: "I think they very much see the world in a black and white way, us against them, Muslims against infidels... [They see] that the infidels led by the United States as part of a Christian-Zionist conspiracy are out to persecute and attack and eliminate Muslims around the world, and therefore, [they] have to run away." However, in common with the Prime Minister, Jones believes the attack was indiscriminate and not an attack on Australians "per se". She suggested Bali was selected as the site of the attacks because there was less chance of Indonesian gangsters being killed, and there was "a chance of getting a few foreigners".

Following the attacks Abu Bakar Bashir, who is alleged to be JI's spiritual leader, released a statement from his prison cell, condemning the attack. But he added that the bombings were a sign of God's displeasure with the Indonesian government. He said: "I suggest the government bring themselves closer to God by implementing his rules and laws because these happenings are warnings from God for all of us." In an interview with Scott Atran from his cell in Cipinang Prison, Jakarta, Bashir said: "I call those who carried out these actions all mujahid. They all had a good intention, that is, Jihad in Allah’s way, the aim of the jihad is to look for blessing from Allah. They are right that America is the proper target because America fights Islam. So in terms of their objectives, they are right, and the target of their attacks was right also."

== Investigation ==
Indonesian police believed that three suicide bombers carried out the bombings. A presidential spokesman Dino Djalal said that the police found a total of "six legs and three heads but no middle bodies, and that's the strong sign of suicide bombers." Photos of the three heads were published in The Jakarta Post on Monday, 3 October 2005. Initially, there were conflicting reports on the number of bombs; but later, the police confirmed only three bombs.

An amateur video capturing the scene at the restaurant in Kuta showed one bomber with a backpack walking inside just seconds before a huge explosion.

On the following Monday, on 3 October 2005, the police issued an appeal to the public for help identifying the suspected suicide bombers whose dismembered remains were found at the scene. Photos of the dead suspects were later distributed widely and a hotline was set up to receive tips.

According to Banten Police Chief Senior Commissioner Badrodin Haiti, the Indonesian police are seeking five members of a ring led by Imam Samudra, who has been sentenced to death for his role in the 2002 Bali bombings. Three of the five men had already served jail sentences for holding explosives belonging to Samudra. They were under police surveillance but had disappeared from their homes.

On 9 October 2005, police in Bali arrested a man, identified by the initials HS, who was allegedly a former roommate of one of the suicide bombers.

According to Indonesian police, in 2005, a corrupt prison warden at the Kerobokan prison smuggled a laptop inside for Imam Samudra, the leader of the terrorist group involved in the first Bali bombing. He then used the laptop and a wireless connection to chat with other terrorist suspects.

== Political response ==
=== Local ===
- President Susilo Bambang Yudhoyono condemned the blasts as a "criminal act" and called for an urgent meeting with Indonesian security officials. He visited the island and vowed that those responsible would be caught, saying "We will hunt down the perpetrators and bring them to justice."
- Coordinating Minister for Political, Legal and Security Affairs Widodo Adi Sutjipto, State Intelligence Agency Head Syamsir Siregar and Police Chief General Sutanto were instructed by the Indonesian President to leave for Bali on the evening of 1 October 2005.
- Vice-president Jusuf Kalla told the BBC that the government was uncertain of the group responsible for the attacks.

=== International ===
- Former Malaysian Prime Minister Mahathir Mohamad said the bombings were not helping what he called the Muslim cause.

== See also ==
- Jakarta Stock Exchange bombing
- Christmas Eve 2000 Indonesia bombings
- 2002 Bali bombings, which killed 202 people
- 2003 Marriott Hotel bombing in Jakarta which killed 12 and injured 150
- 2004 Australian embassy bombing in Jakarta, which killed 9 people
- Jemaah Islamiyah, an Islamic terrorist group that is active in Indonesia
- 2005 Palu market bombing, a 2005 Sulawesi bombing
