= Imam Samudra =

Indonesian terrorist (1970–2008)

- Born: Abdul Aziz; 14 January 1970; Serang, West Java (now Banten), Indonesia
- Died: 9 November 2008 (aged 38); Nusa Kambangan, Central Java, Indonesia
- Other names: Abdul Aziz; Qudama; Kudama; Fatih; Abu Umar; Heri; Fat
- Known for: Christmas Eve 2000 Indonesia bombings and 2002 Bali bombings
- Status: Executed by firing squad
- Allegiance: Jemaah Islamiyah; al-Qaeda
- Conviction: Carrying out an act of terrorism
- Penalty: Death
- Accomplices: Huda bin Abdul Haq; Amrozi bin Nurhasyim

Details
- Date apprehended: 21 November 2002

Imam Samudra (Arabic: الإمام سامودرة, romanized: al-Imām Sāmūdirah, 14 January 1970 – 9 November 2008), also known as Abdul Aziz, Qudama/Kudama, Fatih/Fat, Abu Umar or Heri, was an Indonesian terrorist who was convicted and executed for his role in carrying out the Christmas Eve 2000 Indonesia bombings and 2002 Bali bombings. Samudra, together with Ali Ghufron (known as Muklas) and Amrozi bin Nurhasyim (known as Amrozi) were executed together for their part in coordinating and carrying out the Bali bombings.

== Early life ==
Samudra was born as Abdul Aziz in Serang, Banten (then part of West Java province), he was raised by a single mother as one of 12 children. Samudra graduated from an Islamic school. He left home in 1990 and did not return for a decade, and then only for a few hours before disappearing again, according to his mother. He went to Malaysia and taught at a religious school in the south of the country in the early 1990s. Indonesian authorities say the school was run by the suspected leaders of the militant Jemaah Islamiyah group - Abu Bakar Ba'aysir, the group's spiritual leader, and Riduan Isamuddin, also known as Hambali.

== Bali bombings ==
On 12 October 2002 two bombs exploded in the Kuta tourist area on Bali, Indonesia. One hit Paddy's Irish Bar, and the second exploded in a van outside the nearby Sari club. 202 people were killed.

A third bomb exploded near Bali's US consulate, but no one was hurt. Arrested on 21 November 2002, Samudra was about to board a ferry for Sumatra. Police believe he was the planner or "field commander" of the Bali operation.

Explaining his motives for the bombing to documentarian Daniel Rudi Haryanto from prison, Samudra stated (translated into English by Haryanto):

Sometimes, Jews and Christians are more convinced by the Koran compared to Moslems themselves. They attack Islamic nations because they are afraid the words inside Koran would become reality. So, it's not about oil or nuclear issues at all... I am more convinced by the Koran rather than human analysis. So, it's a matter of aqidah (faith). Until judgment day comes there will never be peace. Unless Islam gets the victory.

=== Trial ===
Samudra went on trial on 2 June 2003 and testified on 16 July 2003:

...[the bombing was] justifiable [under Islamic teachings].... [to] avenge the killings of Muslims by the United States and its allies.

— Imam Samudra, during his trial, July 2003.

=== Sentence and execution ===
On 10 September 2003, he was found guilty for his role in the Bali bombing and sentenced to death. Originally incarcerated in Denpasar's Kerobokan Prison, he was moved to the high-security prison island of Nusakambangan. On 20 November he lodged an appeal against his sentence.

Together with the two other bombers who received death sentences, he launched a constitutional challenge against the use of firing squads. Samudra and the two other bombers preferred beheading, saying that it was a more Islamic form of execution. Despite an initial decision by Muklas, Amrozi and Imam Samudr to not seek a Presidential pardon, on 21 August 2006, Muklas and his co-conspirators authorised their lawyers to file a last appeal which was lodged on 7 December on the basis of retroactive legislation. On 25 September 2008, the Supreme Court of Indonesia rejected the final appeals of Imam Samudra and Mukhlas; having dismissed Amrozi's appeal earlier that month. In October 2008, he remained unrepentant and claimed revenge would be taken for his death. During the month, his final appeals were rejected and the Attorney General's office announced that he would be executed by firing squad in early November 2008.

According to a source in Indonesia's Attorney General Office, the execution was to be done before the end of Sunday, 9 November 2008. This was reportedly delayed from the original plan to allow a representative from the family to identify the body post-execution. However, no representative from Samudra's family were in attendance.

Samudra, along with Amrozi and Huda bin Abdul Haq were executed by firing squad at 00:15 on 9 November 2008.

== Published works ==
From his cell, he wrote an autobiography titled I Fight Terrorists (Aku Melawan Teroris in Indonesian), where the "terrorists" are the Americans. It went on sale for US$3, on a run of 5,000 copies. In 2004, CNN described the book as a "bestseller in Indonesia".

== See also ==
- List of terrorist incidents in Indonesia
- Terrorism in Indonesia
