= 2002 Bali bombings =

Terrorist attacks in Indonesia

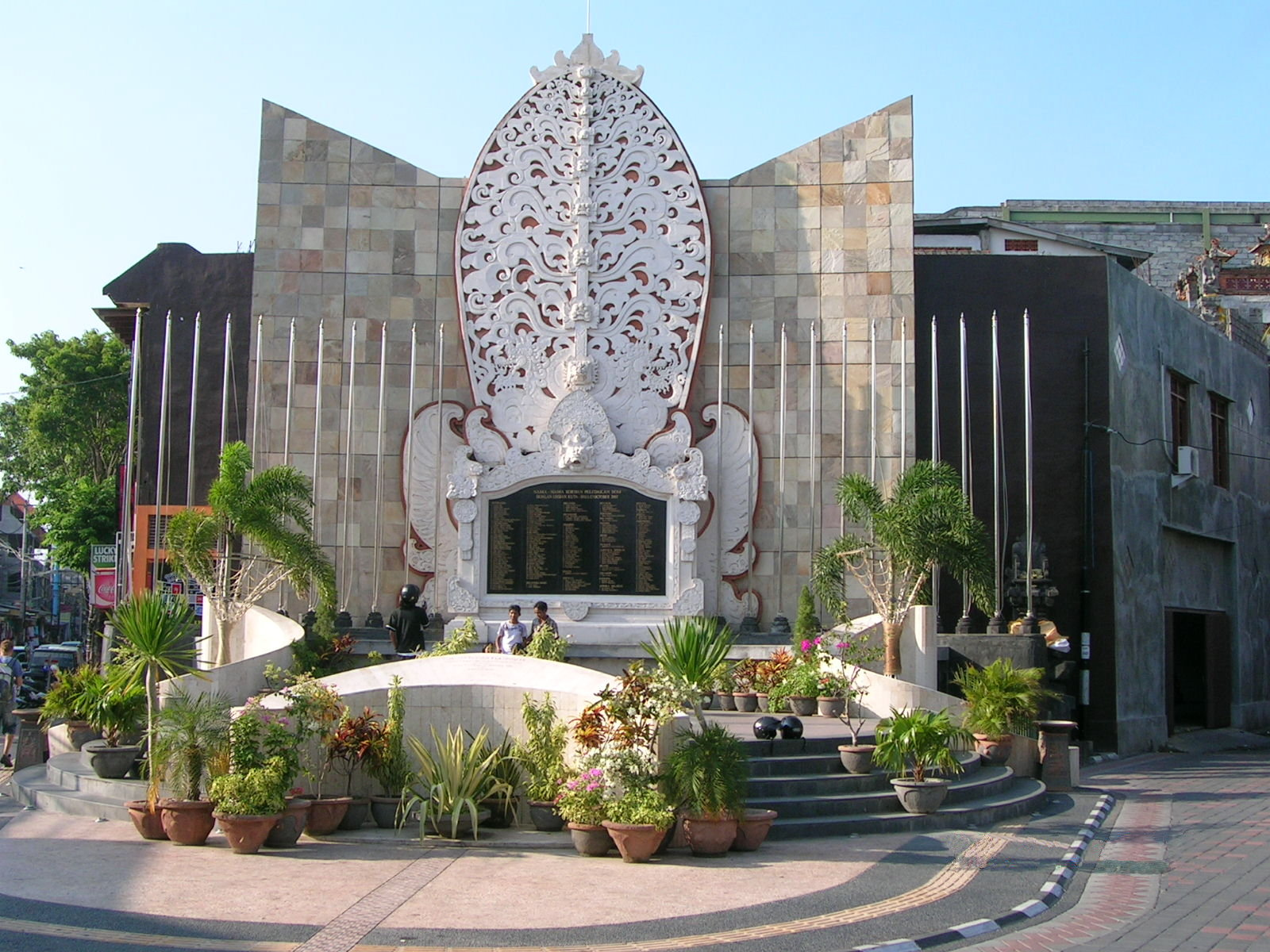
- The Bali Bombing memorial at the site of the original Paddy's Pub across the road from the site of the now demolished Sari Club (to the left of this picture)

- 2002 Bali bombings (Badung Regency) 2002 Bali bombings (Bali) 2002 Bali bombings (Indonesia) Location in Badung Regency, Bali and Indonesia
- Location: 8°43′02″S 115°10′27″E; Bali, Indonesia
- Date: 12 October 2002; 11:05 p.m. Central Indonesia Standard Time (UTC+08:00)
- Target: Two nightclubs (Paddy's Pub and Sari Club) in Kuta; U.S. Consulate in Denpasar
- Attack type: Suicide bombing, car bombing, terrorist attack
- Weapons: Van bomb, explosive belt, Improvised explosive device
- Deaths: 202 (including 2 terrorists)
- Injuries: 209
- Perpetrators: Jemaah Islamiyah; Al-Qaeda
- Motive: Retaliation for support of United States' war in Afghanistan and Australia's role in the liberation of Timor-Leste

On 12 October 2002, three terrorist attacks took place in the tourist district of Kuta on the Indonesian island of Bali. 2 suicide bombings occurred in two popular nightspots in Kuta Beach, the Sari Club and Paddy's Pub, killing a total of 202 people including 151 Western tourists from Australia and Europe as well as 38 local Indonesian residents living or working in businesses or homes around the nightclubs. The blasts injured a further 209 people. It is the deadliest terrorist attack in Indonesia's history.

On 9 November 2005, former Malaysian university lecturer Azahari Husin, a member of Jemaah Islamiyyah and one of the masterminds behind the construction of the bomb, was killed in a police raid in Batu, East Java. Azahari was also believed to be the perpetrator behind several terrorist attacks in Indonesia during the early 2000s. On 9 November 2008, Amrozi bin Nurhasyim, Imam Samudra, and Mukhlas were executed by firing squad at the Nusakambangan prison. On 9 March 2010, Dulmatin, nicknamed "The Genius"—believed to have set off one of the Bali bombs with a mobile phone—was killed in a shootout with Indonesian police in Pamulang, South Tangerang.

== Attack ==
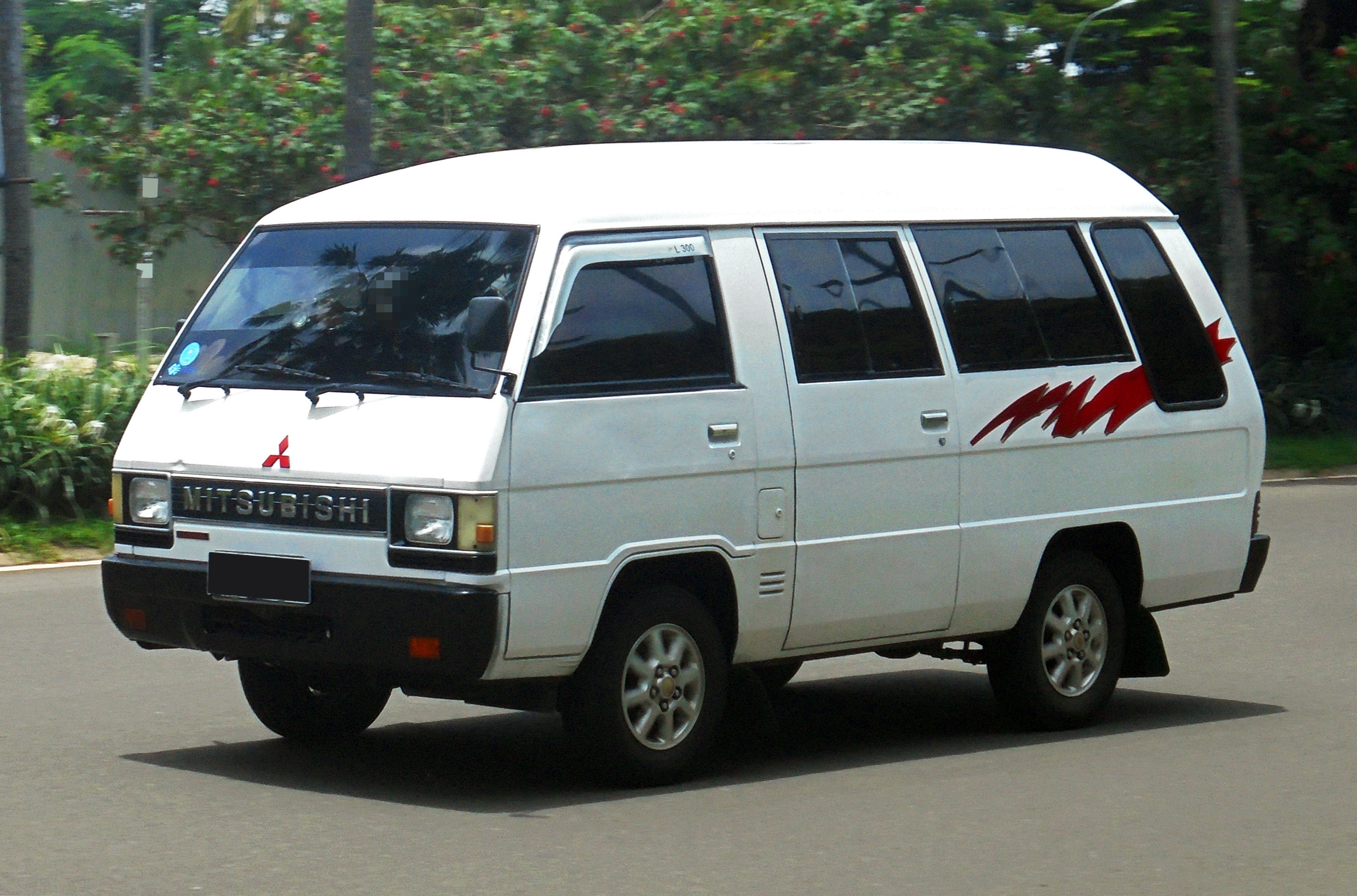
A Mitsubishi L300 van similar to the one in which the car bomb was planted

At around 11:05 p.m., the explosive-laden van was driven by Ali Imron 12.5 kilometers from an isolated safehouse to Kuta Beach, then handed over to Jimi who would detonate the bomb. The van drove onto Legian Street and parked beside the Sari Club. The parking position of the van created a traffic jam behind it. Ali Imron and Idris exited the van and hopped onto a Yamaha FZ1R motorcycle. They drove to the U.S. Consulate building in the suburb of Renon in Denpasar where they planted the bomb and detonated it using a remote detonator. The explosion injured one passerby and caused minor property damage. Meanwhile, terrorist Iqbal walked into the Paddy's Pub nightclub (sometimes called Paddy's Irish Bar or Paddy's Bar) wearing an explosive-laden vest. He headed to the packed dance floor which had approximately 150 people standing feet from the DJ nearby. He then detonated the vest bomb, killing himself and numerous party-goers. Twenty seconds later, suicide bomber Arnasan detonated the explosives-laden van, killing himself and many tourists and partygoers who had exited the Sari Club to investigate the blast at Paddy's Pub.

The bombing occurred during one of the year's busiest tourist periods in Kuta Beach, driven in part by many Australian sporting teams making their annual end-of-season holiday.

Damage to the densely populated residential and commercial district was immense, destroying neighbouring buildings and shattering windows several blocks away. The car bomb explosion left a one-metre-deep (3.3 ft) crater.

The local Sanglah Hospital was ill-equipped to deal with the scale of the disaster and was overwhelmed with the number of injured, particularly burn victims. So many people were injured by the explosion that some of them had to be placed in hotel pools near the explosion site to ease the pain of their burns. Many had to be flown to Darwin (1,800 km or 1,100 mi) and Perth (2,600 km or 1,600 mi), for burn treatment.

== Bombers ==
The individuals involved in the attack were:

- Amrozi bin Nurhasyim: purchased the Mitsubishi van and raw bomb materials, executed by firing squad in November 2008.
- Abdul Aziz (alias Imam Samudra): executed by firing squad in November 2008.
- Ali Gufron (alias Mukhlas): Amrozi's elder brother who had ordered an attack on Bali's nightclubs, executed by firing squad in November 2008.
- Ali Imron (alias Alik): sentenced to life imprisonment.
- Johni Hendrawan (alias Idris): planned and executed the attack on the nightclubs which included scouting the location, teaching the other terrorists how to detonate the bombs, and arranging meetings regarding assembly of the bomb.
- Azahari Husin: mastermind behind the creation of the bomb, killed in a police raid in November 2005.
- Dulmatin: helped build both the car and vest bombs, reported to have allegedly detonated the bomb outside the U.S. Consulate via a remote detonating device, killed in a police raid in March 2010.
- Suranto Abdul al-Ghani: age 34, helped prepare the chemical explosive component of the bombs, escaped with terrorists Abdul and Dedy Mizwar shortly after the explosions, but was later captured and sentenced to life imprisonment.
- Umar Patek: helped design and prepare the van bomb, sentenced to 20 years imprisonment, released on parole in 2022, started a coffee chain "Rami" in 2025.
- Feri (alias Iqbal, aged 24): suicide bomber who detonated the explosive-laden vest inside Paddy's Pub.
- Arnasan (alias Acong, Jimi, or "Iqbal Two", aged 23): suicide bomber who detonated the van bomb outside the Sari Club.

== Victims ==
Total fatalities	202
Fatalities by nationality (Source: SBS News Australia)
Nationality	Deaths
Australia	88
Indonesia	38
United Kingdom	23
United States	7
Germany	6
Sweden	5
France	4
Netherlands	4
Denmark	3
Switzerland	3
New Zealand	3
Brazil	2
Canada	2
Japan	2
South Africa	2
South Korea	2
Italy	1
Ecuador	1
Greece	1
Poland	1
Portugal	1
Taiwan	1
Unknown	3
Fatalities by age (Source: Sydney Morning Herald)
Age	Deaths
Under 21	20
21–30	77
31–40	73
Over 40	28
Unknown	4

The final death toll was 202, mainly Western tourists and holiday-makers (including 88 Australian tourists) who were in or near Paddy's Pub or the Sari Club, but also including many Balinese Indonesians working or living nearby as well as passersby on the street and in vehicles behind the van. The blast also killed several tourists who had fled the explosion at Paddy's Pub and had run out into the street, these being the majority of the fatalities. Hundreds more people suffered horrific burns and other injuries. On 14 October, the United Nations Security Council passed Resolution 1438 condemning the attack as a threat to international peace and security.

=== Awards ===
There were many acts of individual heroism in the bombings' aftermath. Several of these received official recognition under Australia's honours and awards system, particularly in the Special Honours List for 2003.

Timothy Britten, a Senior Constable with the Western Australia Police Force, and Richard Joyes were both awarded the Cross of Valour, Australia's highest civilian honour, for entering the burning remains of the Sari Club to free a badly injured woman from the wreckage; after rescuing her on the third attempt, both men then searched for other potential survivors until the increasing intensity of the flames and of secondary explosions made this impossible. Both men were aware of the possibility of being injured or even killed (Britten specifically believed that yet another bomb might detonate at any moment in order to disrupt rescue efforts and kill emergency workers) and indeed sustained several injuries during their efforts to rescue the woman and find other survivors.

Natalie Goold initially escaped from Paddy's Bar after the bombings but then went back into the burning building, sustaining burns to her right arm and hand, to rescue her friend Nicole McLean, who had been heavily injured by the blasts. After asking two men for their shirts to use as tourniquets for McLean's wounds, Goold secured McLean's transportation to a local hospital and stayed with her during their medical evacuation to Australia.

Robert Meredith and his group of friends were caught up in the bombing of the Sari Club; he was thrown onto his back and badly winded. Amid intense heat and flames, Meredith and his friends lifted about ten survivors over a wall to escape. The wall gave way under the climbers' weight, injuring Meredith's feet and stripping away his thong sandals, which had provided scant protection. He then reached a staircase and assisted more survivors to safety. Meredith would ultimately be left with several burns and cuts to his feet.

Lauren Munro was also caught up in the Sari bombing, being rendered unconscious; when he came to, he pulled free an injured woman who had been trapped under roof beams, and carried her out of the building and over a wall of rubble. Munro helped several other people get over the same wall before re-entering the Sari Club and spending the next two hours carrying out many more injured people and helping to fight the fire. Ben Clohessy was also rendered unconscious by the blast that destroyed the Sari Club and also rescued or helped to rescue other survivors after regaining consciousness. Goold, Meredith, Munro, and Clohessy were all awarded the Star of Courage (SC) on 17 October 2003 for their respective actions.

Awards of the Commendation for Brave Conduct were made to, among other people, Hanabeth Luke. Luke was in the Sari Club with her partner Marc Gajado at the time of the second bombing, with the explosion throwing her to the ground. After managing to escape the now-burning building by climbing through its collapsed roof using severed electrical wire, Luke began a search for Gajado, during which she came across a badly injured Tom Singer. Singer was lying close to a burning car and Luke believed that he would be engulfed in flames if he remained there.

When Singer confirmed that he could not stand up independently, Luke helped him to his feet and supported him in walking away. Luke attempted to re-enter the Sari Club to continue searching for Gajado, but a friend convinced her the area was too hazardous; Gajado was later found to have died instantly. She returned to Singer and assisted others in placing him in a car for transport to the hospital. Singer died in hospital a month later. Separately from her Commendation for Brave Conduct award, a photograph of Luke helping Singer was published in news media around the world in the days after the bombings.

Kusitino 'Kossy' Halemai, a Wallis and Futuna-born Australian citizen who was managing the Bounty Hotel in Kuta at the time of the attacks, sheltered survivors in the immediate aftermath of the blasts. A makeshift triage area in the hotel's reception area was organised by Richard and Gilana Poore, with the couple also fielding phone calls from the media and from families trying to trace loved ones. After three days of this, the Poores flew to Richard's native New Zealand where they organised the collection of eighty boxes of medical supplies; they then returned to Bali with these supplies as well as two burns nurses. Halemai and the Poores were honoured with the Medal of the Order of Australia (OAM), with Gilana Poore's OAM being awarded on 26 January 2005, Halemai's OAM being awarded on 13 June 2005, and Richard Poore's OAM being awarded on 22 August 2005.

James Parkinson, an emergency nurse, worked alongside Doctor Hogg from Wollongong in the Denpasar Sanglah Hospital running the trauma centre for the bombing victims. After he disappeared in Africa and Europe for three years, the Governor General's department finally tracked him down and awarded Parkinson the Medal of the Order of Australia in 2005.

=== The bomb ===
The Mitsubishi L300 van bomb was initially thought to have consisted of C4, a military grade plastic explosive which is difficult to obtain. However, investigators discovered the bomb was made from potassium chlorate, aluminium powder, and sulfur. For the Sari club bomb with the L300 van, the terrorists assembled 12 plastic filing cabinets filled with explosives. The cabinets, each containing a potassium chlorate, aluminum powder, sulfur mixture with a TNT booster, were connected by 150 metres (490 ft) of PETN-filled detonating cord. Ninety-four RDX electric detonators were fitted to the TNT. The total weight of the van bomb was 1,020 kilograms (2,250 lb). The large, high-temperature blast damage produced by this mixture was similar to a thermobaric explosive, although the bombers may not have known this.

== Suspects ==
The organization suspected of responsibility for the bombing was Jemaah Islamiyah, an Islamist group allegedly led by radical cleric Abu Bakar Bashir. A week after the blasts, Arab satellite channel Al-Jazeera put to air an audio-cassette purportedly carrying a recorded voice message from Osama bin Laden that stated the Bali bombings were in direct retaliation for support of the United States' war on terror and Australia's role in the liberation of Timor-Leste.

You will be killed just as you kill, and will be bombed just as you bomb. Expect more that will further distress you.

The recording did not however claim responsibility for the Bali attack. Former FBI agent Ali Soufan confirmed in his book, The Black Banners, that al-Qaeda did in fact finance the attack. In addition, Riduan Isamuddin confessed that al-Qaeda had sent him US$30,000 to fund the bombings of the two nightclubs.

Aris Munandar (aka Sheik Aris) is a Jemaah Islamiyah associate linked to Bashir. He is believed to have assisted the Bali bomber Amrozi in acquiring some of the explosives used in the Bali bombings. Philippine intelligence considers Munandar to be associated with Mohammad Abdullah Sughayer, a Saudi national Abu Sayyaf Group in southern Philippines. Munandar is still at large. A report by the United States-Indonesia Society describes the arrest of Amrozi and other suspects.

General Pastika ordered his men to make the arrest early the next morning, November. Amrozi was asleep in the rear of the house. According to Greg Barton's account, Amrozi did not attempt to escape, but laughed instead, later exclaiming, "Gosh, you guys are very clever, how did you find me?" Amrozi's mobile phone, a particularly important piece of evidence, was seized during his arrest. Bags of chemical ingredients for bombs were found in his workshop and soil samples taken from outside his home showed traces of the primary chemical used in the Sari Club bomb. Police found receipts for the purchase of chemicals used to make the bombs, as well as a list of expenses incurred in making the bombs. Further search of Amrozi's home revealed copies of speeches by Osama bin Laden, and Abu Bakar Bashir, the radical Indonesian Muslim cleric reputed to be the leader of Jemaah Islamiyah. The speeches exhorted listeners to wage jihad. Police also uncovered training manuals on ambush techniques and numerous articles on jihad. Under questioning Amrozi revealed the names of six others involved in the bombing: Ali Imron, Imam Samudra, Dul Matin, Idris, Abdul Ghani and Umar Patek. But Amrozi's mobile phone proved to be the real catch. Indonesian investigators were able to print out a list of calls he had made immediately before, during and after the bombing, as well as the names and telephone numbers in the phone's memory. Pastika kept Amrozi's arrest secret for two days. After it was announced, Polri monitored the sudden flurry of communications among numbers listed in Amrozi's telephone before the calls abruptly ceased. The investigators were able to identify the location of a number of the telephones, leading to a series of arrests.

Indonesian authorities also believe more suspects remain at large. In 2005, Indonesian police arrested 24 additional people suspected of involvement in the Bali attacks and a 2003 bombing of the Marriott Hotel in Jakarta.

On 12 October 2005, a story in Australian broadcaster SBS's documentary series Dateline, called "Inside Indonesia's War on Terrorism", argued that the Indonesian military or police may have been involved in executing the attack.

On 13 June 2007, it was reported that Abu Dujana, who might have headed a terrorist cell in Bali, was captured.

Just past midnight on 9 November 2008, the three convicted of carrying out the bombings (Imam Samudra, Amrozi Nurhasyim, and Ali Ghufron) were executed by a firing squad.

Umar Patek was finally arrested in Abbottabad, Pakistan in early 2011. The U.S. government had offered a US$1 million reward for his arrest. Patek is a suspect in other bombings as well as the one in Bali.

Another suspect named Zulkarnaen was finally arrested in Lampung on 10 December 2020. He was also stated to have orchestrated numerous Jemaah Islamiyah-related incidents in the past and been one of the executives of said terrorist group.

== Legal proceedings ==
=== Initial charges and trials ===
In April 2003, Indonesian authorities charged Abu Bakar Bashir (also rendered "Ba'asyir"), the alleged spiritual leader of Jemaah Islamiyah, with treason. It was alleged that he tried to overthrow the government and establish an Islamic state. The specific charges against Bashir related to a series of church bombings on Christmas Eve in 2000, and to a plot to bomb United States and other Western interests in Singapore. He was initially not charged over the Bali attack, although he was frequently accused of being the instigator or inspirer of the attack. On 2 September, Bashir was acquitted of treason but convicted of lesser charges and sentenced to a prison term of four years. He said he would appeal.

On 15 October 2004, he was arrested by the Indonesian authorities and charged with involvement in another bomb attack, which killed 14 people at the J. W. Marriott hotel in Jakarta on 5 August 2003. Secondary charges in this indictment accused him of involvement in the Bali bombing, the first time he faced charges in relation to this attack.

On 3 March 2005, Bashir was found not guilty of the charges surrounding the 2003 bombing, but guilty of conspiracy over the 2002 attacks in Bali. He was sentenced to two and a half years imprisonment. The Australian, US, and many governments expressed its disappointment that the sentence was too short. In the outcome, Bashir was freed on 14 June 2006 having served less than 26 months for his conspiracy. On 21 December 2006, Bashir's conviction was overturned by Indonesia's Supreme Court.

On 30 April 2003, the first charges related to the Bali bombings were made against Amrozi bin Haji Nurhasyim, known as Amrozi, for allegedly buying the explosives and the van used in the bombings. On 8 August, he was found guilty and sentenced to death. Another participant in the bombing, Imam Samudra, was sentenced to death on 10 September. Amrozi's brother, Ali Imron, who had expressed remorse for his part in the bombing, was sentenced to life imprisonment on 18 September. A fourth accused, Ali Ghufron, the brother-in-law of Noordin Mohammed Top was sentenced to death on 1 October. Ali Ghufron, alias Mukhlas, told police that he was the head of one of Jemaah Islamiyah's four cells and had ordered the Bali bombings. He also confessed that a fellow leader Riduan Isamuddin, known as Hambali, had provided the funds for the attacks. He told police,

I do not know for sure the source of the aforementioned money from Hambali; most probably it was from Afghanistan, that is, from Sheikh Usama bin Laden. As far as I know, Hambali did not have a source of funds except from Afghanistan.

Another operative, Wan Min bin Wan Mat, revealed to police that he had given Mukhlas money, at Hambali's request and that he understood part of the money had come directly from al-Qaeda.

As noted below, all three were executed on 9 November 2008. The Australian, US, and many other foreign governments expressed satisfaction with the speed and efficiency with which the Indonesian police and courts dealt with the bombings primary suspects, despite what they characterized as light sentences. All Australian jurisdictions abolished the death penalty more than 30 years ago, but a poll showed that 77% of Australians approved of the death sentence for Amrozi. The Australian government said it would not ask Indonesia to refrain from using the death penalty.

On 11 August 2003, Riduan Isamuddin, generally known as Hambali, described as the operational chief of Jemaah Islamiyah was arrested in Ayutthaya, Thailand, the old capital one hour's drive north of Bangkok. He is in American custody in the Guantanamo Bay detention camp.

=== Constitutional appeals ===
On 23 July 2004, one of the convicted bombers, Maskur Abdul Kadir, successfully appealed his conviction. He had been tried under retroactive laws which were introduced after the bombing and which were employed to aid the prosecution of those involved in the attack. These laws were used by the prosecution instead of existing criminal laws as they allowed the death penalty to be imposed and lowered certain evidentiary restrictions.

The highest court in Indonesia, the Constitutional Court, found by a margin of five to four that trying the terrorist suspects under these retroactive laws violated Article 28I(1) of the constitution [2]. The minority judges argued that international human rights documents such as the International Covenant on Civil and Political Rights allowed an exception to not applying retrospective legislation in the prosecution of crimes against humanity. The majority found that this argument was inconsistent with the text of Article 28I(1) which states that the rights listed there "cannot be limited under any circumstances".

Following this decision, charges related to the bombings against Idris, who had confessed to participating in the attacks to the police and court, were dismissed. The legal status of Kadir, Idris and others who might have their convictions quashed following the ruling on the retrospective law is unclear.

The Constitutional Court is a relatively new body, created after the fall of Suharto, and this decision was one of the first to overrule the constitutionality of the government's application of a law.

=== Execution of perpetrators ===
On 24 October 2008, Bali officials announced that three men convicted of carrying out the bombings would be executed by firing squad in November 2008. On 25 October 2008, Communications and Information Minister asked the Indonesian media to stop calling the three "heroes".

The Denpasar District Court, on 3 November, accepted a reprieve motion to reconsider the death sentences. Fahmi Bachmid, a lawyer for the family of Jafar Sodiq, a brother of Amrozi and Mukhlas, stated: "We lodged the judicial review to Denpasar court to question (previous) decisions." Lawyer Imam Asmara Hadi stated: "We have lodged an appeal because we haven't received a copy of the Supreme Court rejection of our previous appeal."

Indonesia's Supreme Court denied previous petitions for judicial review amid the constitutional court's dismissal of the bombers' appeals. Denpasar court official Nengah Sanjaya said the 3-page appeal would be sent to a Cilacap, central Java court. But the Attorney General's office said on 1 November the execution was "very close". Supreme Court judge Djoko Sarwoko, however, said a "last-minute legal challenge by the relatives of Imam Samudra, Amrozi Nurhasyim and Ali Ghufron will not change or delay the execution." They were moved to isolation cells, and execution spots were ready on the Nusakambangan island prison where they were being held. Local chief prosecutor Muhammad Yamin said they would be "executed simultaneously" but at different locations.

Amrozi, Imam Samudra and Ali Ghufron were executed by firing squad after midnight on 9 November 2008 (West Indonesian time). In the final moment, there was no remorse or repentance, and they shouted Allahu Akbar ("God is great!"). Despite his carefree demeanor throughout his trial and incarceration, the Australian edition of The Daily Telegraph reported Amrozi was pale-faced and shaking in the moments before his execution. For burial, Mukhlas and Amrozi's bodies were flown by helicopter to Tenggulun, Lamongan, East Java, while Imam Samudra's body was flown to Serang, Banten, amid "welcome martyrs" banner displayed at the cemetery.

The execution caused high tension and sparked clashes in Tenggulun between hundreds of police and supporters. Indonesian singer and TV presenter Dorce Gamalama attended the funeral of Imam Samudra. After praying with the crowd, she spent half an hour in the house of the executed man and spoke with his mother. On leaving she was quoted as saying "I'm certain he's gone to heaven". Ma'ruf Amin, deputy chairman of the Indonesian Ulema Council, the chief body for Islamic clerics in Indonesia said of the men: "They did not die a holy death. That can only be in a war and Indonesia is not at war."

After the execution, several countries issued a travel warning to Indonesia due to safety issues. The travel warning resulted in cancellation of Barbadian singer concert Rihanna that was scheduled to be held at Istora Gelora Bung Karno on 14 November 2008, five days after the execution. The concert was originally rescheduled to 12 February 2009, but was cancelled again due to Chris Brown assault on Rihanna incident. as a result, she become the first artist to cancel the concert at Istora after 48 years of operational.

== Memorials ==
=== Bali ===
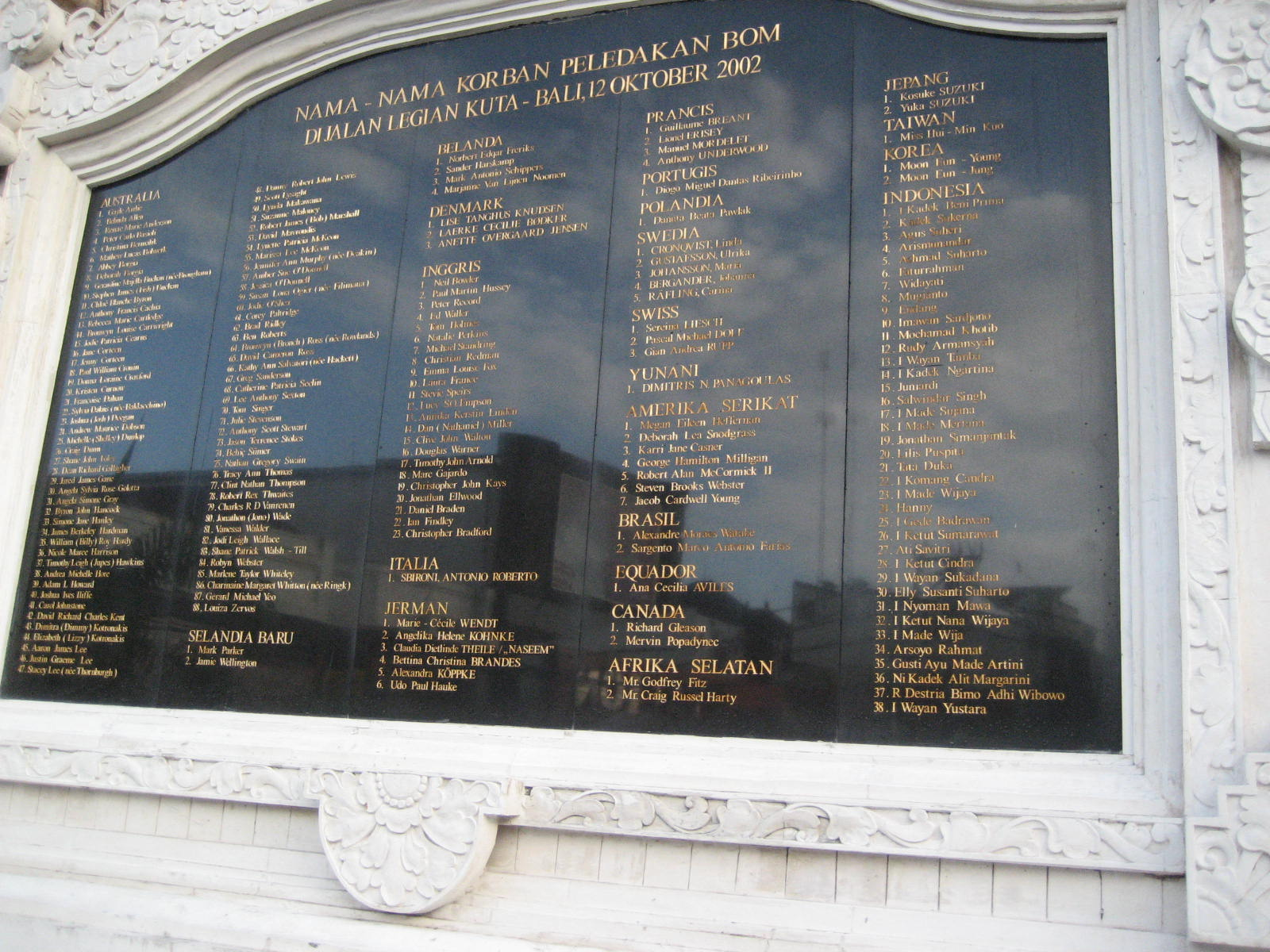
List of victims

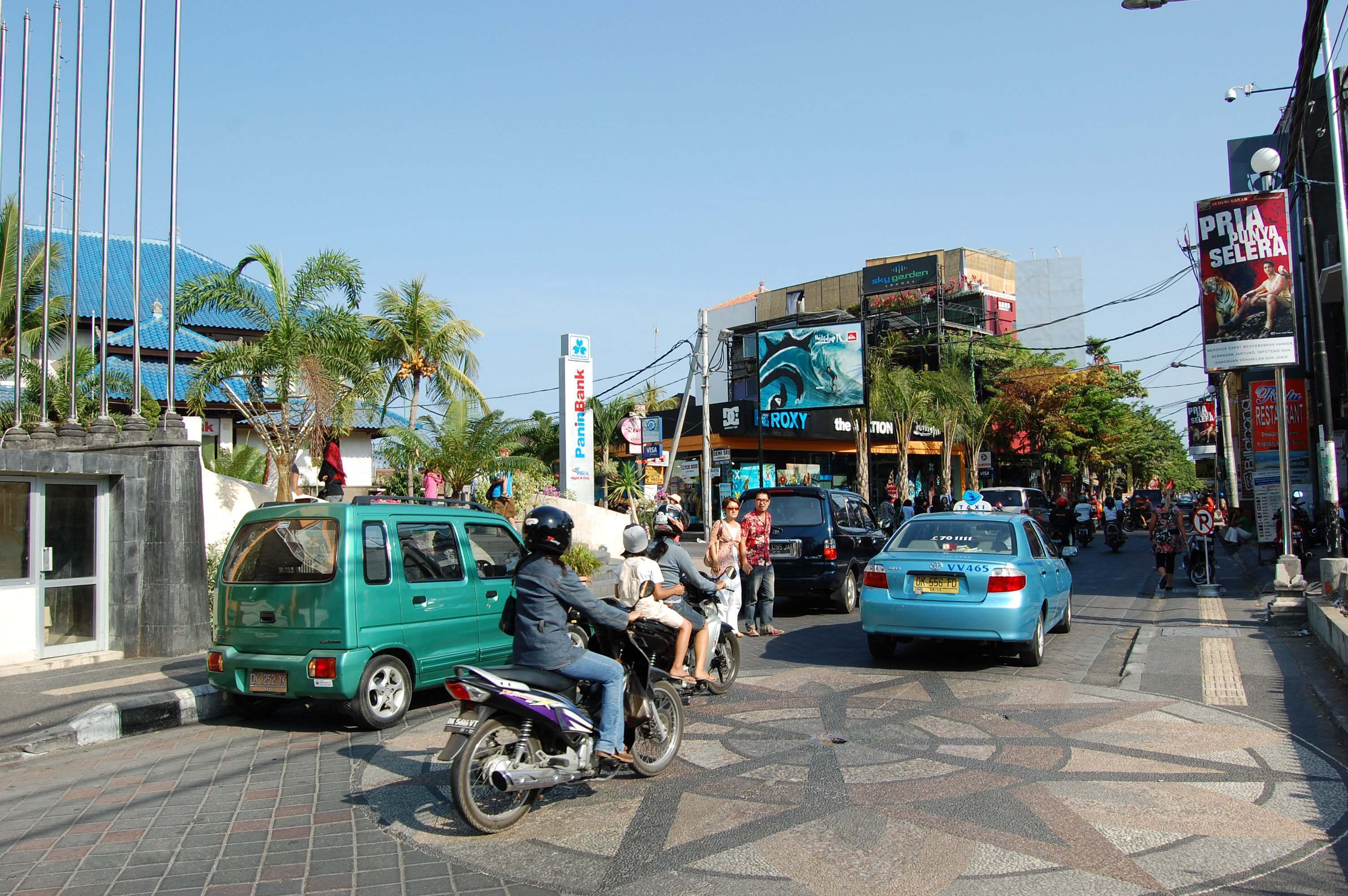
The bombing site and memorial in September 2007

A permanent memorial was built on the site of the destroyed Paddy's Pub on Legian Street. (A new bar, named "Paddy's: Reloaded", was reopened further along Legian Street). The memorial is made of intricately carved stone, set with a large marble plaque, which bears the names and nationalities of each of those killed. It is flanked by the national flags of the victims. The monument is well-maintained and illuminated at night.

The memorial was dedicated on 12 October 2004, the second anniversary of the attack. The dedication included a Balinese Hindu ceremony and the opportunity for mourners to lay flowers and other offerings. The Australian ambassador and Indonesian officials attended the ceremony.

The Balinese mark their commitment in a nine-day-long event. After major cleansing ceremonies, establishing a memorial for the lost lives, and paying respect to those who left loved ones behind, the people of Kuta look forward to restoring Bali's image through an event named "Kuta Karnival — A Celebration of Life". The community event consists of traditional art performances such as Balinese Sunset Dances, sports on the beach as well as in the water for young and old plus rows and rows of culinary displays along the one kilometre of sandy beach.

In line with the return of tourism to Kuta, Kuta Karnival has grown into a tourism promotional event with major coverage from television and newspapers from across the globe. Companies, embassies, Non-Government Organizations, associations and even individuals come forth to get involved in the various events such as a Balinese dance competition presented by a surf-wear company, an environment exhibition presented by an embassy, a fun cycle presented by a group of individuals, a seminar presented by an association and a parade on the streets presented by an NGO. Tourists and locals alike, more than ninety thousand people, participate in the numerous events year after year.

Further bombings in Bali in 2005 did not reduce the Kuta community's determination to carry out this annual event. Kuta Karnival is conducted to commemorate and give respect to the victims of human violence and show the world the true spirit of local community survival despite terrorism attacks.

On 12 October 2010, Australian and Indonesian survivors of the 2002 bombings attended a solemn commemoration service to mark the eighth anniversary of the devastating attacks.

=== Melbourne ===
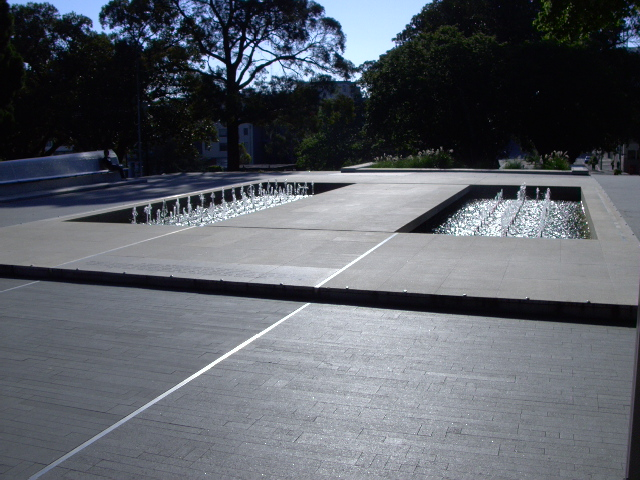
Bali 2002 bombing memorial, Swanston Street, Melbourne

In Lincoln Square on the western side of Swanston Street in Carlton, Melbourne, is a memorial representing the 88 Australians who died in the bombings, and notably the 22 from Victoria.

There are 88 jets in the fountain; at night, there are lights representing all those who died. The fountain shuts off and becomes a reflecting pool on 12 October each year.

This was one of the very few fountains allowed to operate during the drought in 2007.

Christine Anu sang The Lighthouse by toxtwo at the opening ceremony.

==== Jason McCartney ====
One Melbournian survivor of the bombings was North Melbourne AFL player Jason McCartney. He suffered second-degree burns to over 50% of his body while helping carry others to safety and nearly died during surgery after being transported back to Melbourne.

But what a moment this is, for not only Australia, not only for AFL football, but for the free world as well. Now, I'm not trying to overdramatize things...this shows terrorism, as I said, will never beat courage. Welcome back indeed, Jason McCartney, an inspiration to all.

— Eddie McGuire on Nine Network's television call of McCartney's return after the bombings (North Melbourne vs. Richmond, Round 11, 2003)

After a long rehabilitation process, McCartney returned for a single AFL match: North Melbourne vs. Richmond at Docklands Stadium in Melbourne on 6 June 2003. He wore compression garments and protective gloves as well as the numbers "88" and "202" on his jersey, signifying the Australian and total numbers of victims, respectively, while many in the crowd held up signs saying "Bali 88/202". Other Australian victims were honoured in a video shown on the stadium's video screens before the game, with the attendees including Melbourne players Steven Febey and Steven Armstrong, who were both injured in the blast, and representatives from five Australian rules football clubs who lost players in the attacks were presented to the crowd. McCartney helped North Melbourne to a narrow win before announcing his retirement at the end of the game, and his comeback has been cited as one of the AFL's most inspirational stories.

=== Perth ===
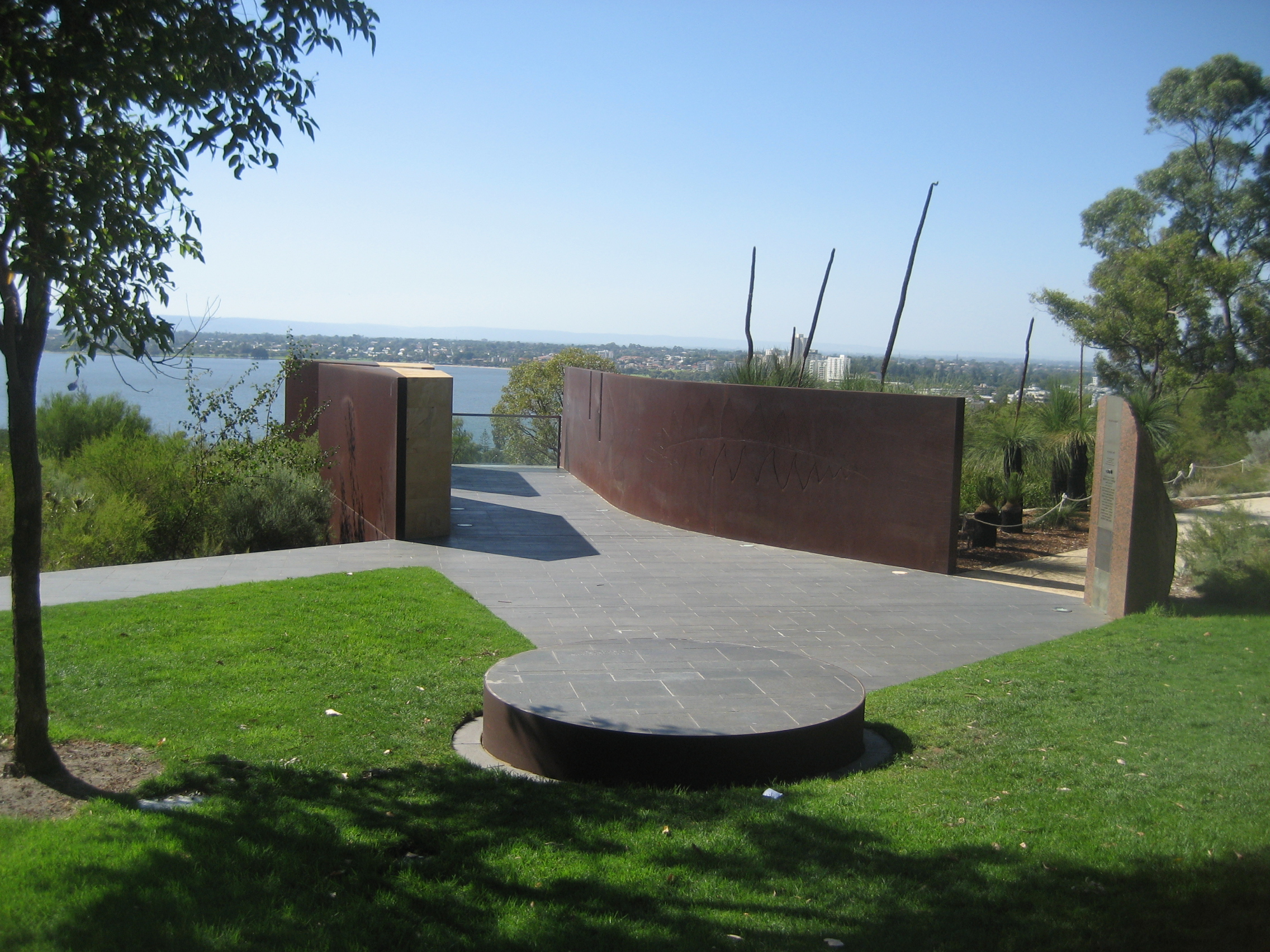
Memorial at Kings Park, Perth

A memorial which lists the victims of the bombings from Western Australia was opened on the first anniversary, and is situated on the ridge of Mount Eliza in Kings Park, overlooking the city. The memorial is specifically designed to frame the sun's rays at dawn on 12 October each year and faces in the exact direction of Bali. Due to the construction of EQ West in Elizabeth Quay, sunlight no longer reaches the memorial.

=== Gold Coast ===
An Indonesian-style stone memorial is situated in Allambe Memorial Park at Nerang. A bronze plaque lists the names of the 88 Australians who died in the bombings. An annual twilight service is held at the site of the memorial on each anniversary of the Bali bombings.

In 2004, the Australian Department of Foreign Affairs and Trade said a Candlelight Bali Remembrance Service would be held at Allambe Memorial Park in Nerang from 5 pm to 7 pm.

=== Sydney ===
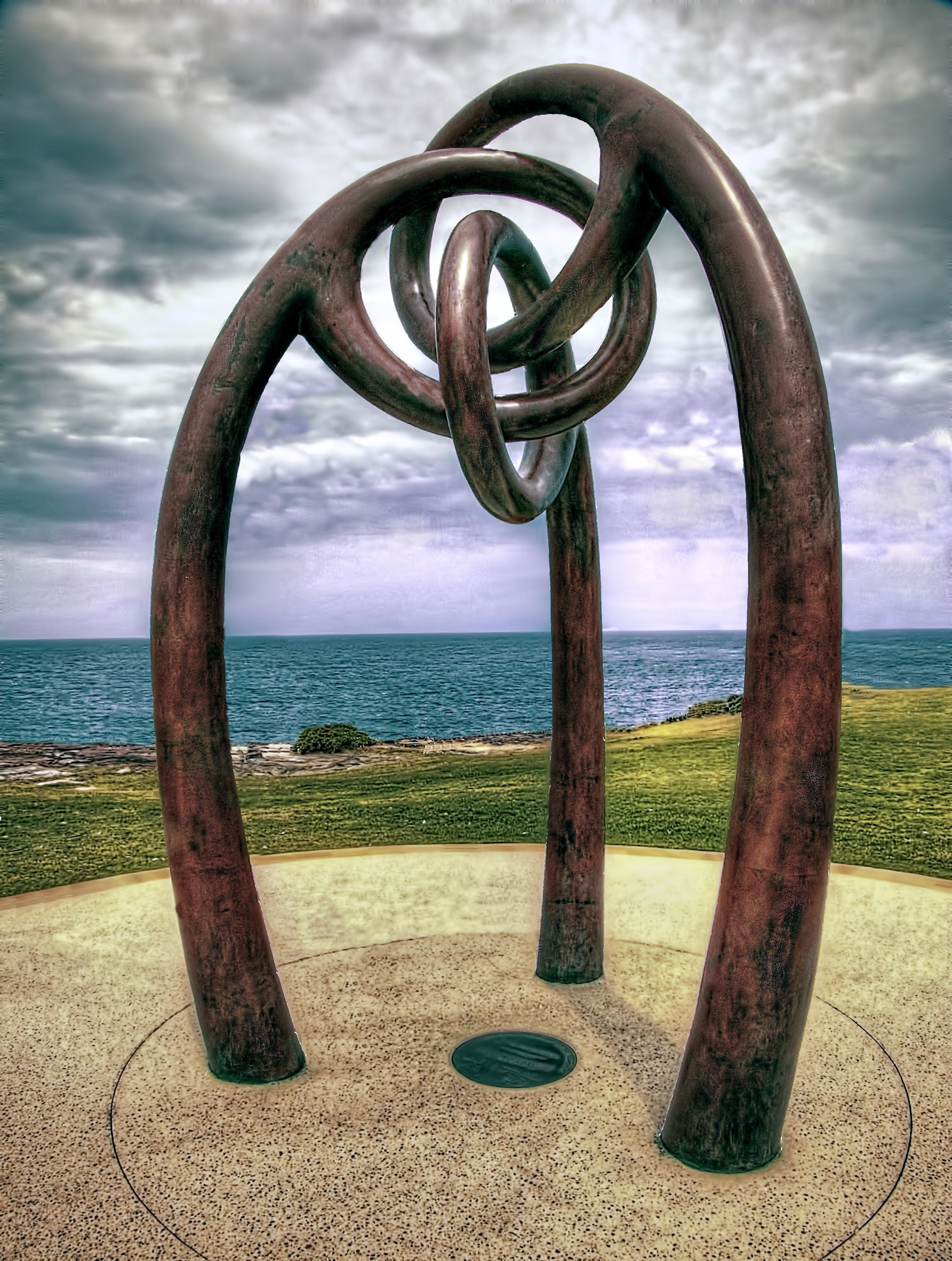
Memorial at Dolphin Point, Coogee Beach, to 20 of the Australian Bali bombing victims who were residents of Coogee and its neighbouring suburbs

On the northern side of Coogee Beach a memorial to the Bali bombing victims comprises three interlocking bronze shapes that have an abstract resemblance to three bowed figures supporting each other. There are also some graffiti memorials in memory of the dead.

A memorial to seven residents of Sutherland Shire who were victims is at Cronulla. Called The Seed, the work is based on the seed and foliage of the Banksia robur, a native plant indigenous to the Shire. This sculpture of pink sandstone is the centrepiece of the memorial. It is set in a black granite pond located in 'Peryman Place' not far from North Cronulla Beach, frequented by many of the seven victims and their families.
Two plaques are set into the granite surrounding the pond. The plaques carry the victims' photos, names, and ages; and also details of the event, the design's symbolism, its dedication, and a poem written by the families of the victims. The work is by sculptor Chris Bennetts and Ishi Buki Sandstone Sculpture.

South of Sydney, in the town of Ulladulla, a large youth centre was built as a memorial to Craig Dunn and Danny Lewis, two local victims of the bombings. Money was raised through the Dunn & Lewis Youth Development Foundation.

=== Canberra ===
A granite cube serves as a memorial in the Eastern Formal Gardens of Parliament House.

=== London ===
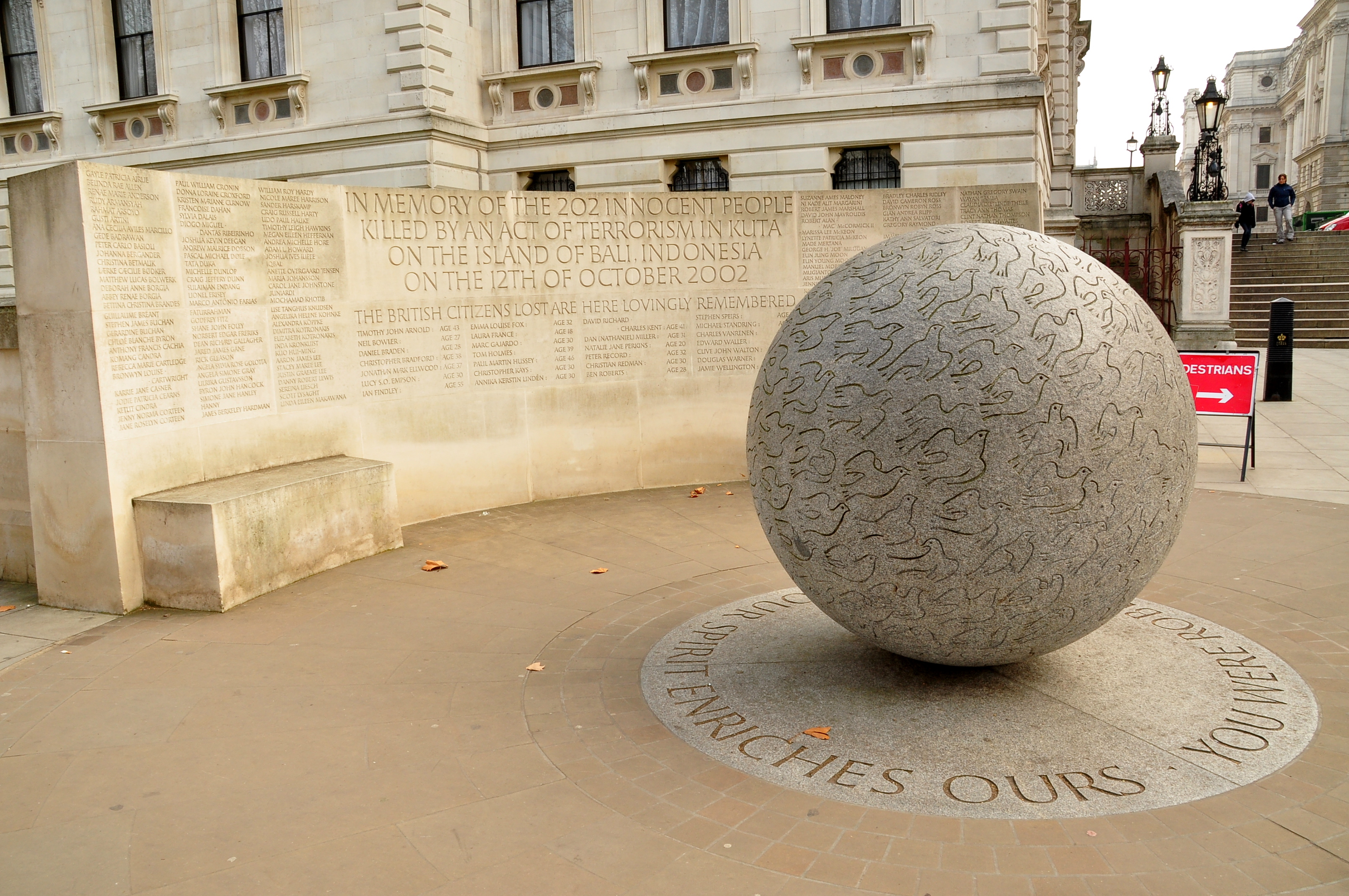
Memorial in London, outside the Foreign and Commonwealth Office

On the fourth anniversary of the bombings the Prince of Wales and Duchess of Cornwall (now Charles III and Queen Camilla) unveiled a memorial in London, at the rear of the Foreign and Commonwealth Office Main Building, facing St. James's Park. The memorial consists of a 1.5-metre marble globe, to represent that people from 21 countries were killed, and has 202 doves carved into it. The names of all 202 victims are on a curved stone wall behind the globe. It is the work of the artist Gary Breeze and the sculptor Martin Cook.

There is a small stone memorial to the 28 British nationals who died, in the small country park of Ratby Burroughs in Leicestershire.

=== Hong Kong ===
In 2005, two marble wall placards were unveiled at Hong Kong Football Club in memory of the members of the club who were killed in the bombings (including Jake Young).

=== Singapore ===
Every year since 2002, the Rugby Section of the Singapore Cricket Club (the "SCC") has held a dawn memorial service on the Padang (the SCC's rugby field in central Singapore) on the anniversary of the bombings, to honour the memory of the eight players which the SCC lost (Neil Bowler, Chris Redman, Dave Kent, Peter Record, Tim Arnold, Chris Bradford, Chris Kays and Charlie Vanrenen). The service is attended by survivors of the 2002 rugby tour to Bali, friends and family of those who lost their lives, as well as current and past players of the club.

The SCC also maintains a permanent memorial to the players it lost inside the club's main lounge.

=== Vietnam ===
A remembrance garden was constructed at the International School Ho Chi Minh City commemorating teachers from that school who were killed in the bombings.

== In media ==
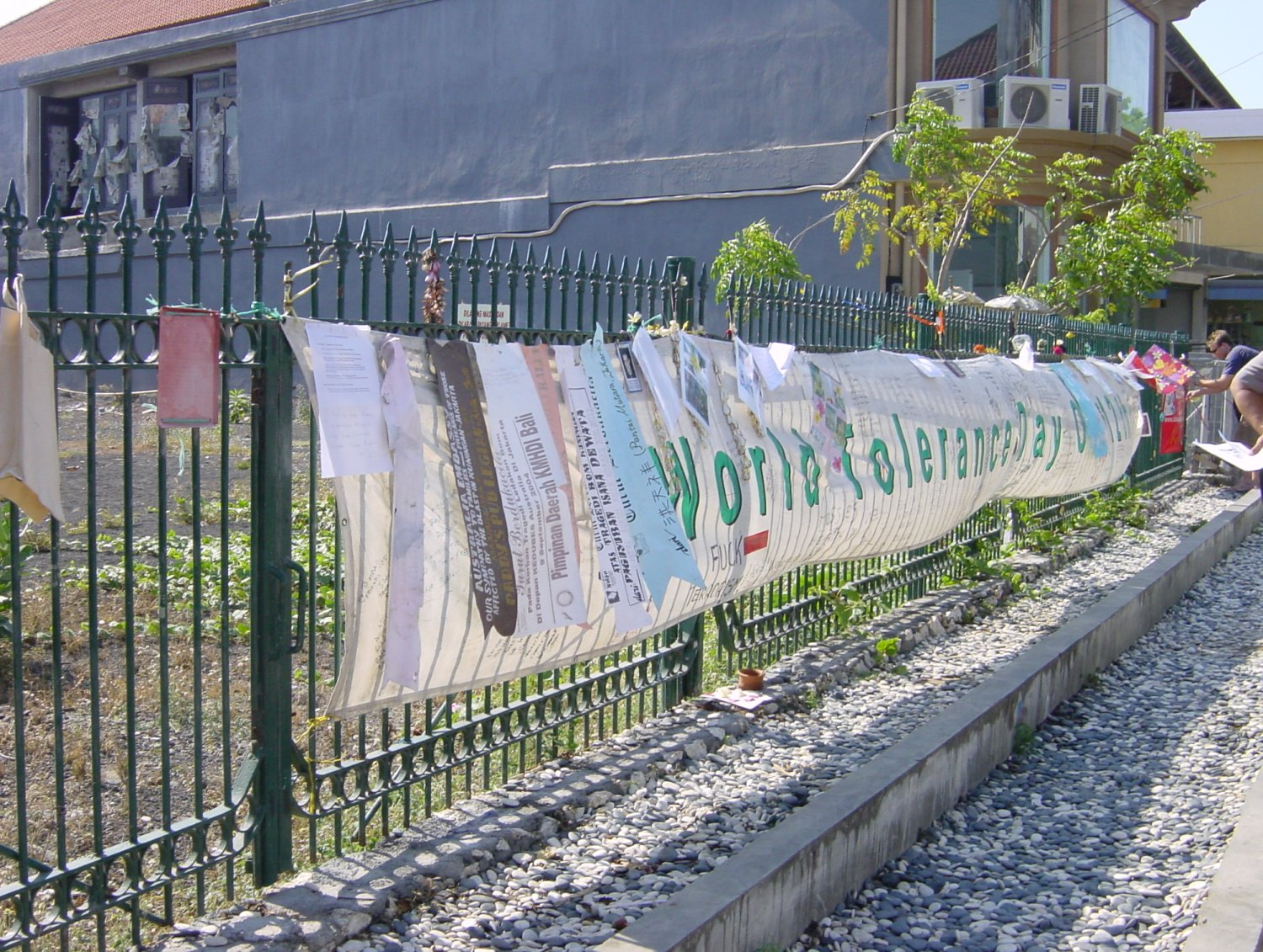
Peace Park at the former site of the Sari Club

In 2006, Long Road to Heaven, an Indonesian feature film about the bombings, was released by Kalyana Shira Films. The film was directed by Enison Sinaro and written by Wong Wai Leng and Andy Logam-Tan. It stars Raelee Hill, Mirrah Foulkes, Alex Komang, Surya Saputra, John O' Hare, Sarah Treleaven, and Joshua Pandelaki. It tells the story during three different times: the planning a few months before the bombing, its execution in 2002, and the trials in 2003 through the viewpoints of both the victims and the bombers. The story is not chronologically linear, starting with the explosion and then moving from time to time so as all three plots are culminated one after the other. At the beginning of each scene, subtitles tell the date and location of the scene.

A comic book about the first Bali bombing was launched to promote peace and discourage radicalism and terrorism in Indonesia. The book, Ketika Nurani Bicara (When Conscience Speaks), tells about the bombing from the perspective of three people: a volunteer who helped evacuate a bombing victim who lost her husband in the blast; a victim who struggled to raise her children without her husband; and a terrorist who regrets his involvement in the bombing.

A Seconds from Disaster episode, "Bali Bombings", was a documentary telling the story of what happened, and looking at what happened after the incident.

A Zero Hour documentary depicts the disaster.

Bali Boom Boom, a 2004 pоrnographic film, contains amateur footage recorded at Paddy's Pub and Sari Club before and after the bombings, in which several of the performers died. The film's tagline was "Police couldn't catch us, the terrorist didn't even get us."

In 2019, survivor Erik de Haart appeared on a season 4 episode of the Australian TV show You Can't Ask That, titled "Disaster Survivors". He answered interview questions about his experience of the bombings alongside other survivors of disasters, speaking about topics such as the loss of six of his friends in the attack. Erik de Haart is known for saving numerous lives during the bombings.

In 2022 (20 years after the incident), the Australian-Indonesian historical drama Bali 2002, aired on Stan and Nine Network.

== See also ==
- 2005 Bali bombings
- Christmas Eve 2000 Indonesia bombings
- 2004 Jakarta embassy bombing
- Anti-Australian sentiment
- Bali Mandara Eye Hospital
- List of terrorist incidents
- List of terrorist incidents in Indonesia
- Terrorism in Indonesia
