= Richard B. Poore =

Richard Beresford Poore OAM (born 22 July 1965) in Christchurch, New Zealand, and his wife Gilana, (an Australian citizen), were awarded OAMs For service to Australia by providing assistance to the victims of the bombings which occurred in Bali on 12 October 2002, and to their families.

He is the son of Matt Poore, who played test cricket for New Zealand in the 1950s.
