= Nurul Iman Mosque, Padang =

Mosque in Padang, West Sumatra, Indonesia

Nurul Iman Mosque
- Masjid Nurul Iman
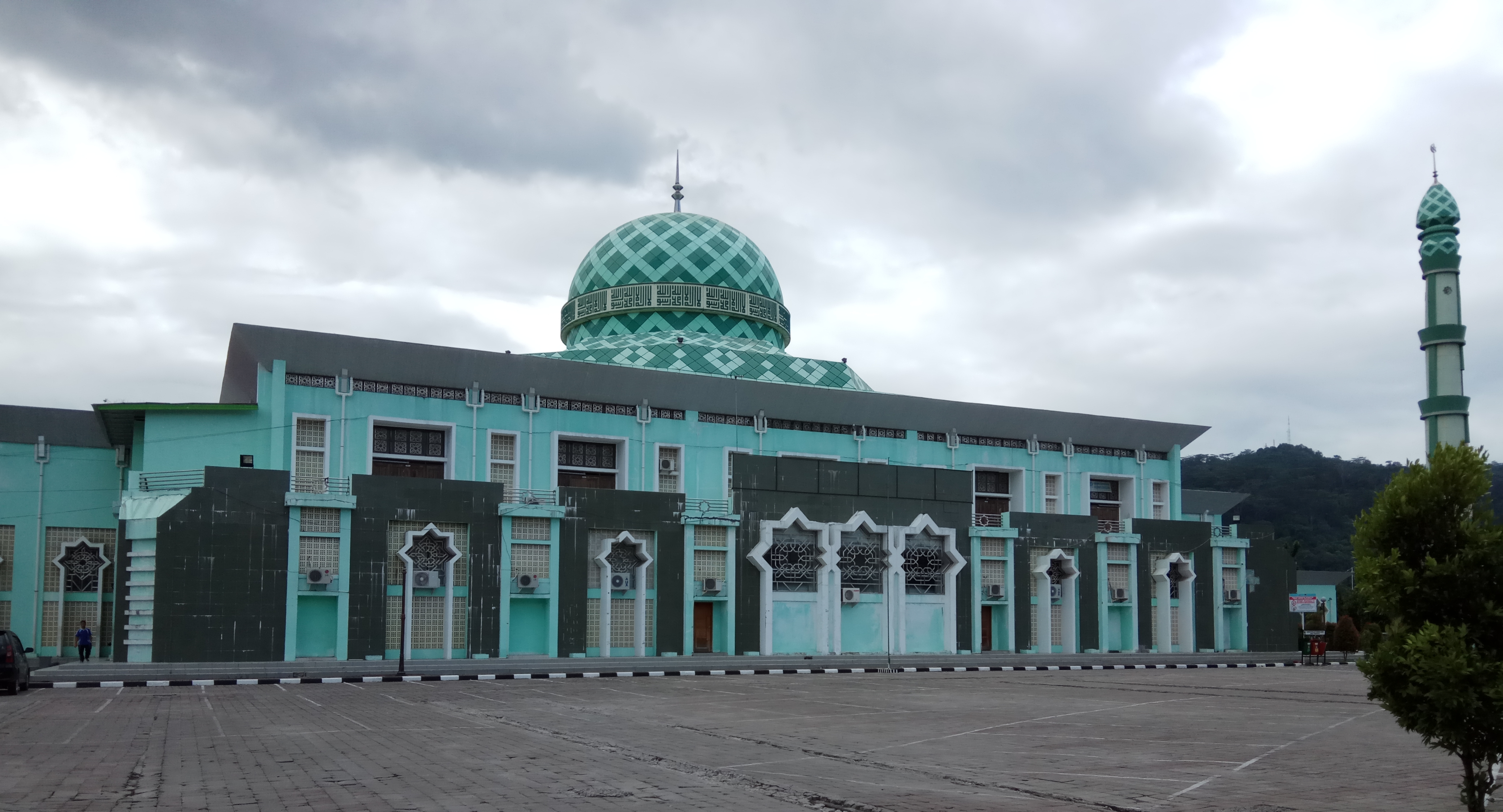

Religion
- Affiliation: Islam
- Branch/tradition: Sunni

Location
- Location: Padang, Indonesia
- Interactive map of Nurul Iman Mosque
- Coordinates: 0.954788°S 100.362310°E

Architecture
- Type: Mosque
- Style: Middle East
- Groundbreaking: 2004
- Completed: July 7, 2007
- Construction cost: Rp 18.4 billion

Specifications
- Dome: 1
- Minaret: 1

The Nurul Iman Mosque (Masjid Nurul Iman) is a mosque located at the corner of Jalan Imam Bonjol and Jalan Muhammad Thamrin in Padang, Indonesia. The mosque was built by the Indonesian National Armed Forces and the national government, as a gesture of apology following a West Sumatran rebellion in 1960.

== History ==
In 1961, during the tenure of Kaharudin Datuk Rangkayo Basa, the governor of West Sumatra, the Indonesian National Army, and the government planned to reconstruct the mosque as a gesture of reconciliation, in order to suppress a regional insurgency. The construction was started on September 26, 1965, in an area of 1.18 hectares (2.9 acres) and designed a plan for two floors within the building. The Government of West Sumatra provided additional funds for the entire construction of Nurul Iman Mosque which was covered by 1966.

A bomb explosion took place inside the mosque on November 11, 1976 (source not identified). Though there were no casualties reported, the explosions caused severe damage to the attic of the first floor and the side glass windows were broken down. However, the routine Friday Prayers held the next day despite the closure of mosque for investigation. The culprit, Timzar Zubil, who was said to be a member of the Komando Jihad, an Indonesian Islamic extremist group, was caught in 1979 and sentenced to death. Later, the judgment was changed to life imprisonment. In 1982 (while formally in custody), he visited the Nurul Iman mosque in Padang to pray for his actions. However, he was released in 1999.

In 2004, during the tenure of Zainal Bakar (Governor of West Sumatra), there was a plan to renovate the mosque. The demolition of the mosque seems to be neglected until the end of Zainal Bakar's span in 2005. The new mosque was completed during the tenure of Gamawan Fauzi in 2007; and inaugurated by the Vice President Jusuf Kalla on July 7, 2007.

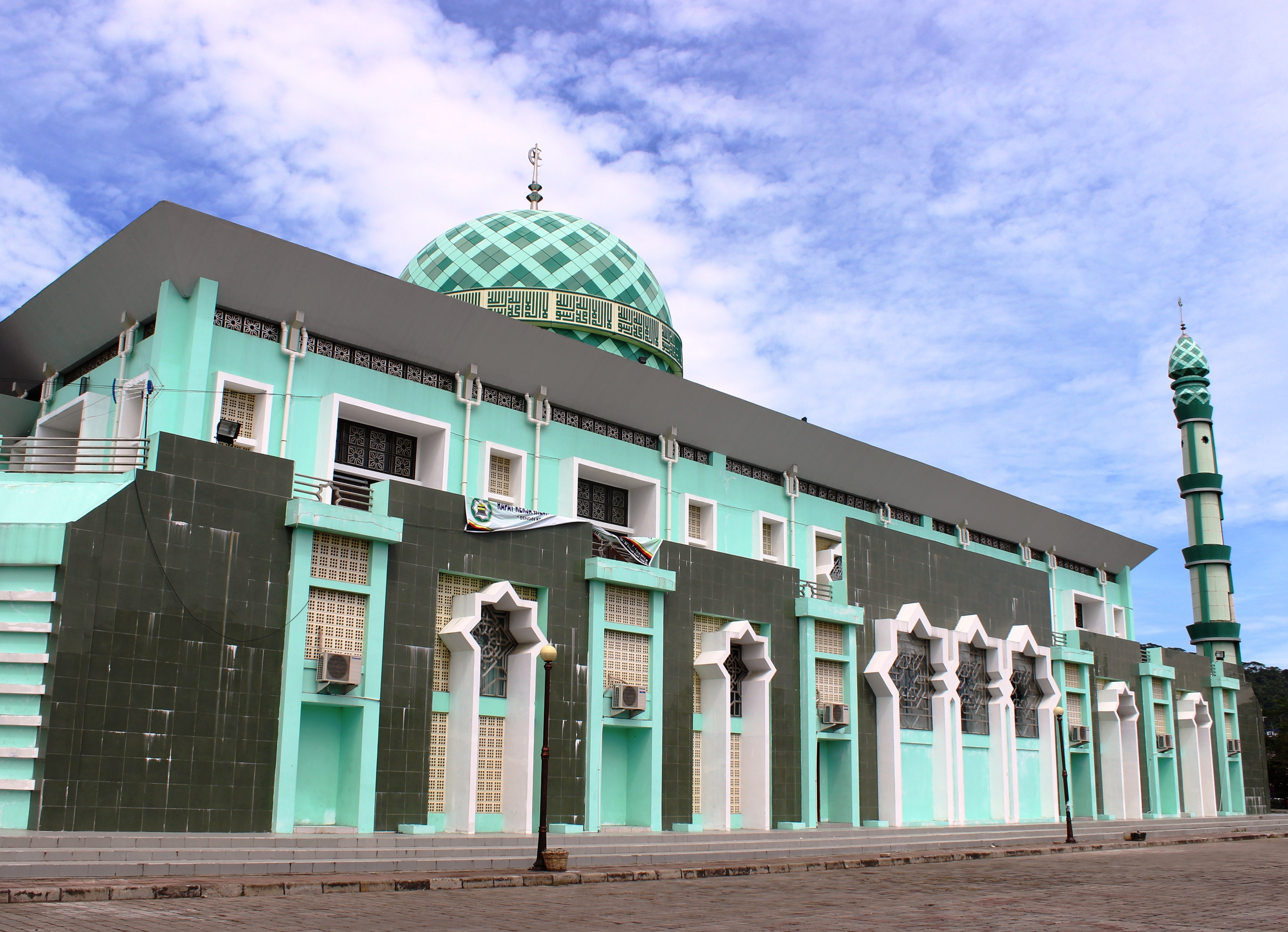
nurul iman mosque walls

Two years later, on September 30, 2009, the mosque was damaged again due to the earthquake that struck the doomed West Sumatra. Damage was apparently on wall panels and the ceramic floors.

== Architecture ==
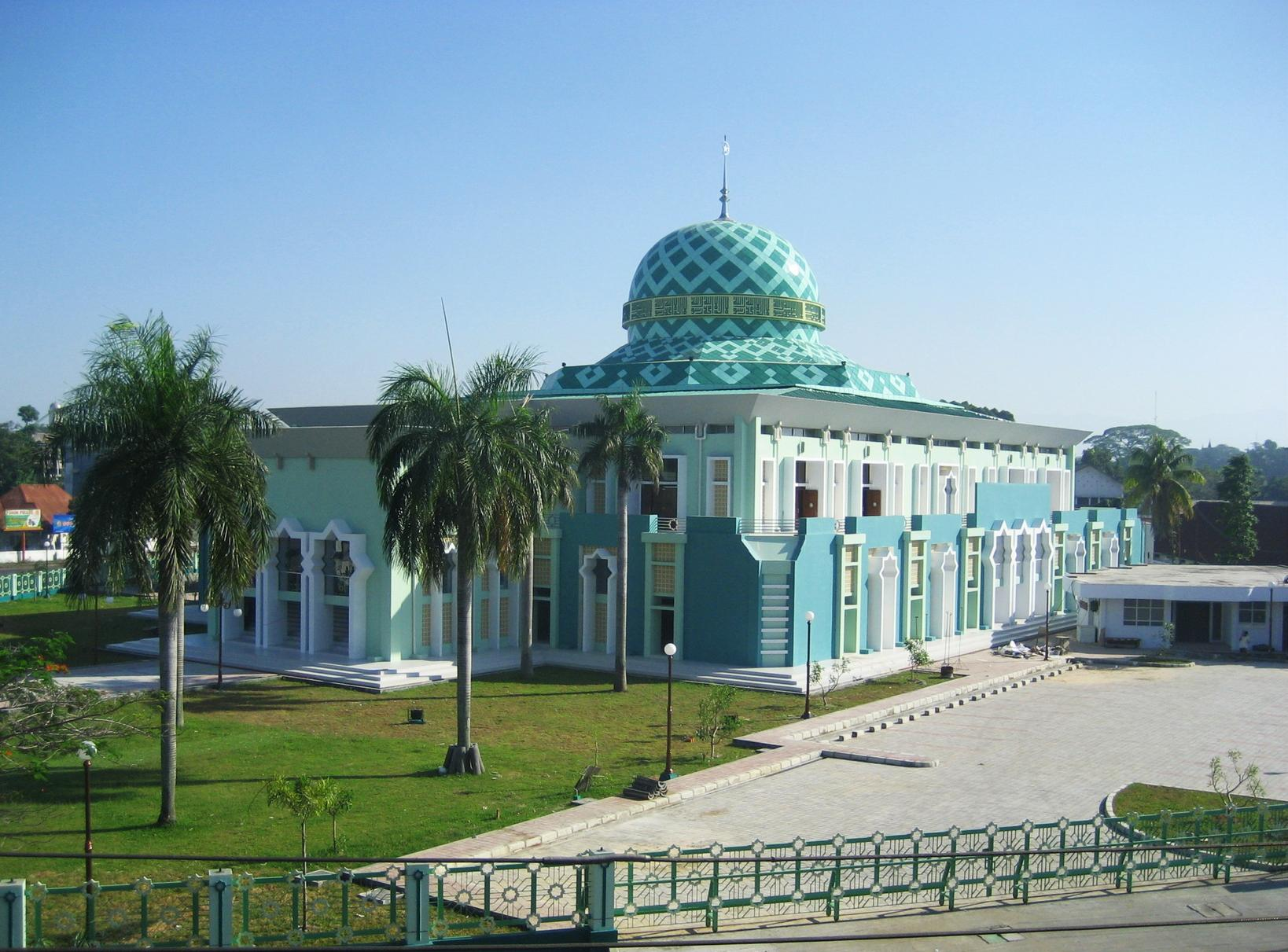
Nurul Iman mosque.

The mosque was designed in a Middle Eastern style, a typical style for most modern mosques in Indonesia. It has one dome and a minaret constructed separately from the main building. The facade is mostly green and is decorated with geometric motifs.

== See also ==
- List of mosques in Indonesia
