= Selamat (Tenggulun) =

- Village
- Location within Indonesia Location within Sumatra
- Coordinates: 4.0520°N 97.9210°E
- Country: Indonesia
- Province: Aceh
- Regency: Aceh Tamiang Regency
- District: Tenggulun District

Population (2024)
  - Total: 5,432
- Time zone: WIB (UTC+7)

Selamat is a village (desa) in the administrative district (kecamatan) of Tenggulun, part of the (regency) of Aceh Tamiang in the mortheast of the province of Aceh, Indonesia. As at mid 2024, the village had a population of 5,432.
