= Christmas Eve 2000 Indonesia bombings =

Bombings in Indonesia churches in 2000

- Location: Medan, Bandung, Batam, Ciamis, Mataram, Mojokerto, and Pekanbaru
- Date: 24 December 2000
- Target: Churches
- Attack type: Terrorist attack
- Deaths: 18
- Injuries: 118
- Perpetrators: Al Qaeda; Jemaah Islamiyah
- Motive: Islamic extremism, Anti-Christianity

On 24 December 2000, a series of explosions took place in Indonesia, which were part of a high-scale terrorist attack by Al Qaeda and Jemaah Islamiyah. The attack, which occurred on Christmas Eve, involved a series of coordinated bombings of churches in Jakarta and eight other cities which killed 18 people and injured many others.

== Bombing locations ==
A breakdown of the bombings is as follows:

- Jakarta: Five Catholic and Protestant churches, including the Roman Catholic Cathedral, were targeted, killing at least three people.
- Pekanbaru: Four police officers were killed trying to disarm a bomb; a civilian also died
- Medan: Explosions hit churches
- Bandung: Bomb exploded during production, three suspects died
- Batam Island: Three bombs injured 22
- Mojokerto: Three churches bombed; one dead. One of them is the Eben Haezer church in Jalan Raden Ajeng Kartini. At around 8:30pm on 24 December 2000, while trying to throw the bomb away, a Muslim security volunteer, Riyanto, was killed.
- Mataram: Three churches bombed
- Sukabumi: Bombings killed three

== Arrests ==
Two suspects were arrested following the bombings. Indonesian police say they found documents implicating Hambali in the bombings. Abu Bakar Bashir was tried for involvement in the bombings in 2003 but was found not guilty; he was subsequently convicted of involvement in the 2002 Bali bombings.

== In popular culture ==
The Indonesian progressive metal band Kekal has cited the bombings as an inspiration for its anti-terrorism song "Mean Attraction," which appeared on its third full-length album, The Painful Experience.

== See also ==
- Terrorism in Indonesia
- Christmas in Indonesia
- Freedom of religion in Indonesia
