= Terrorism in Indonesia =

- Part of the war on terror
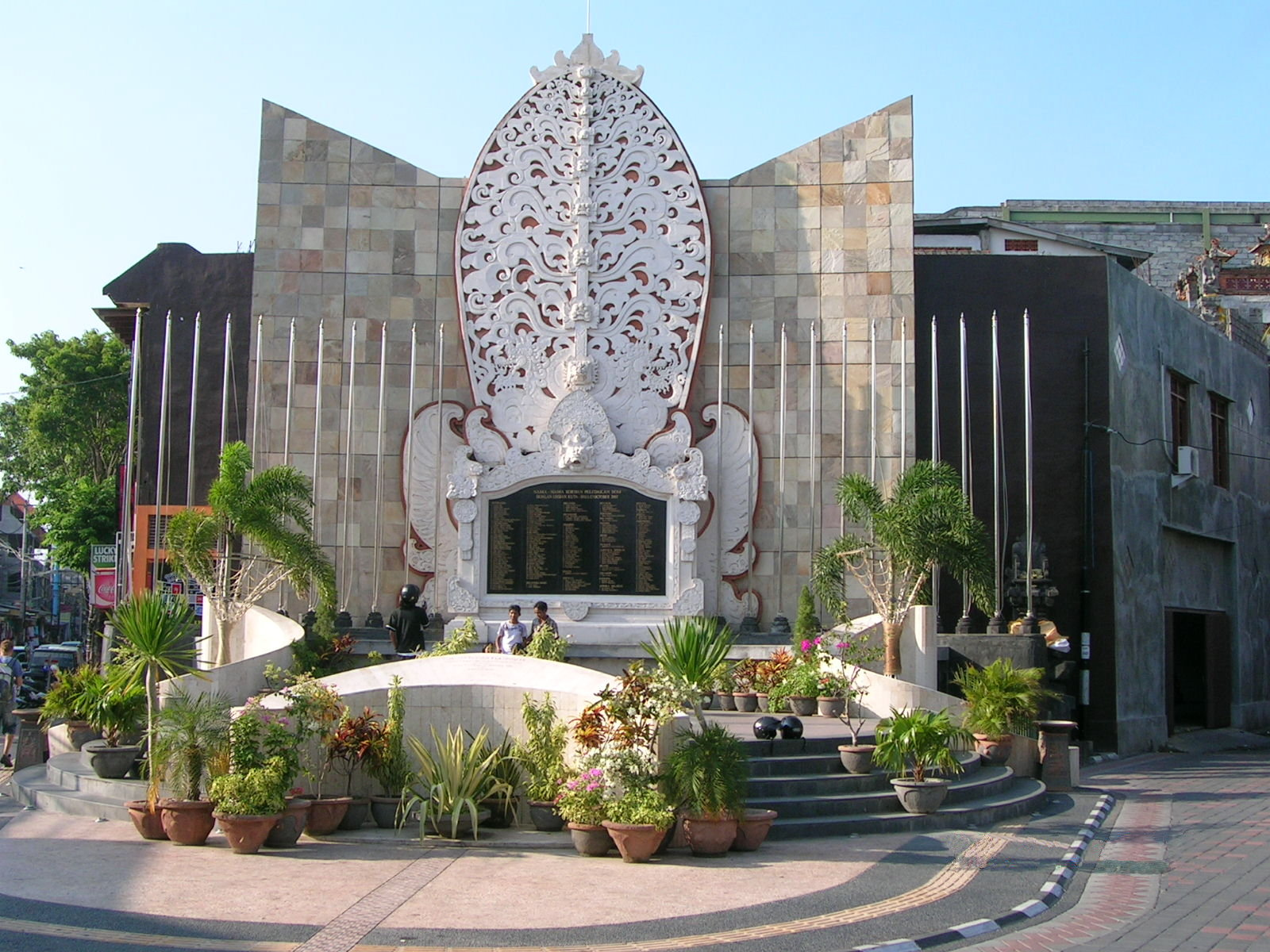
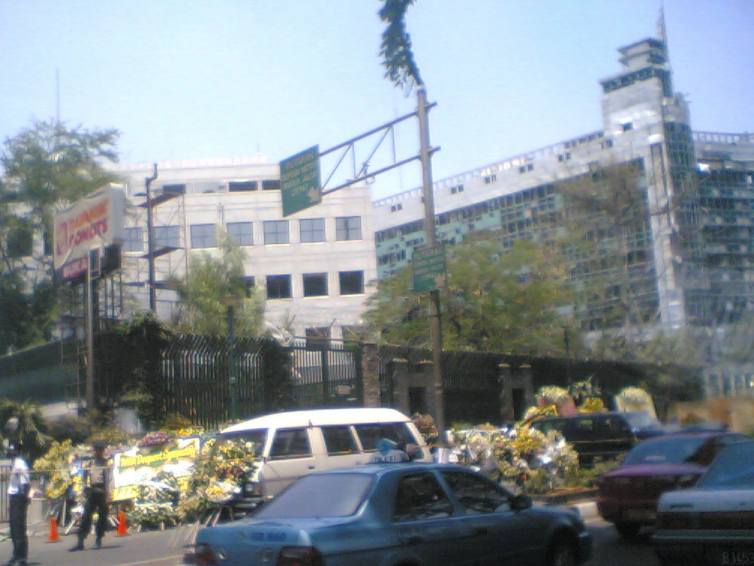
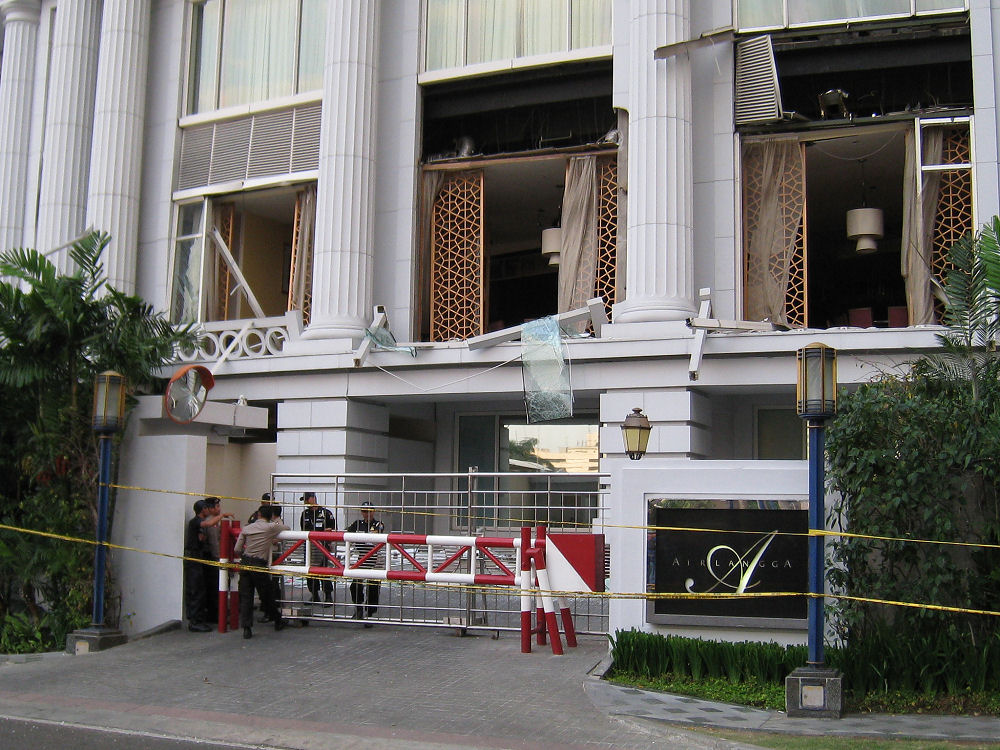
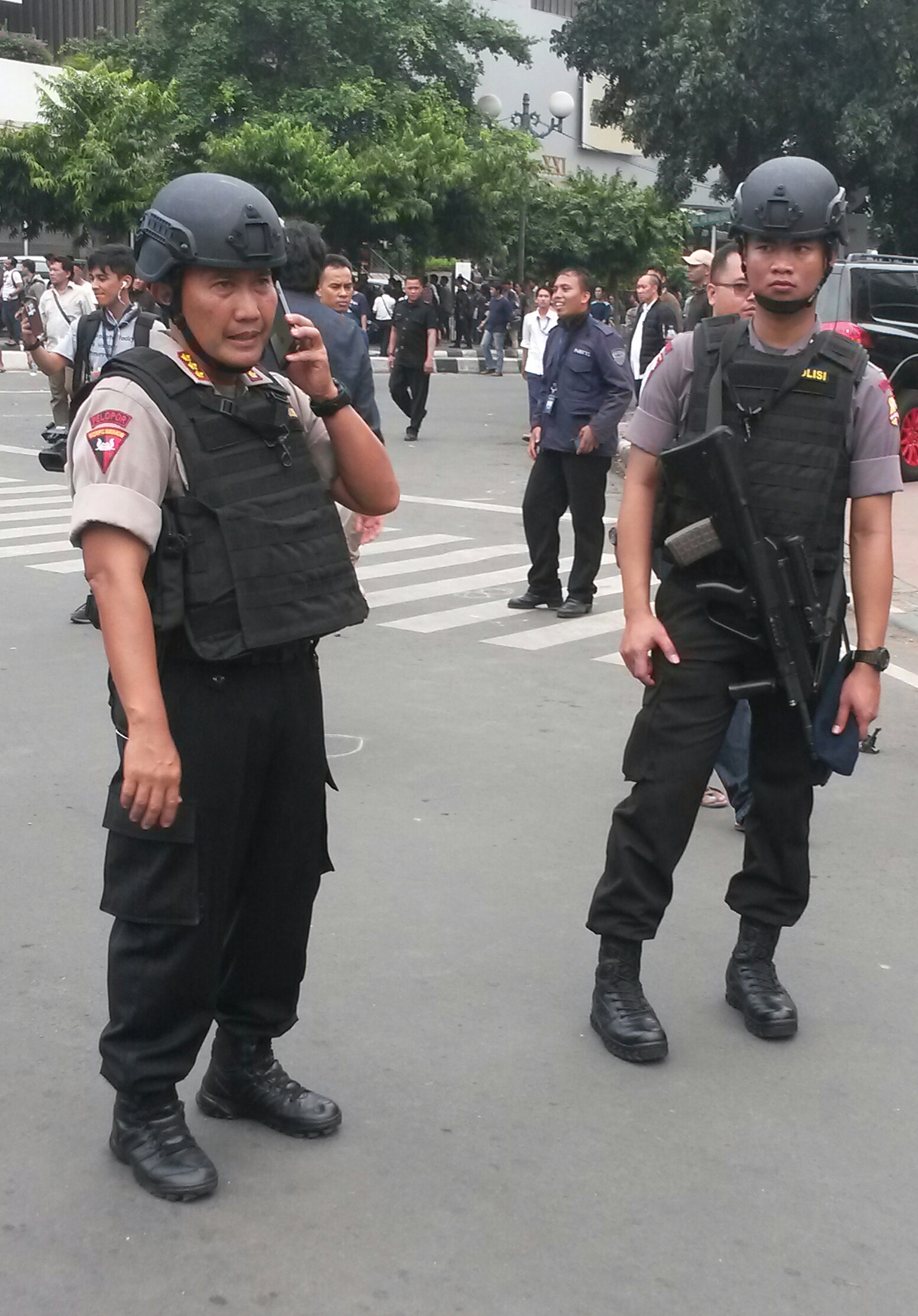
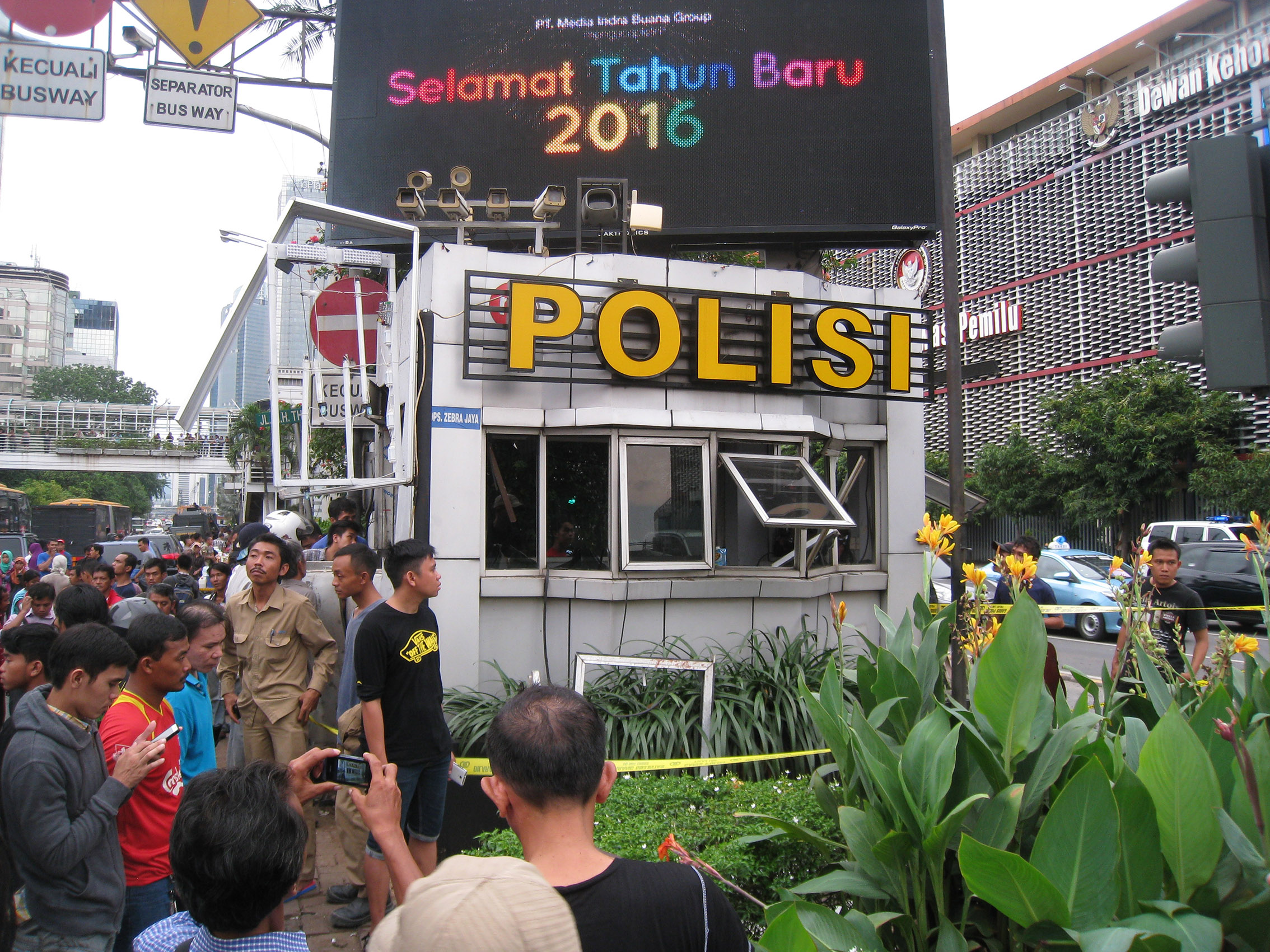
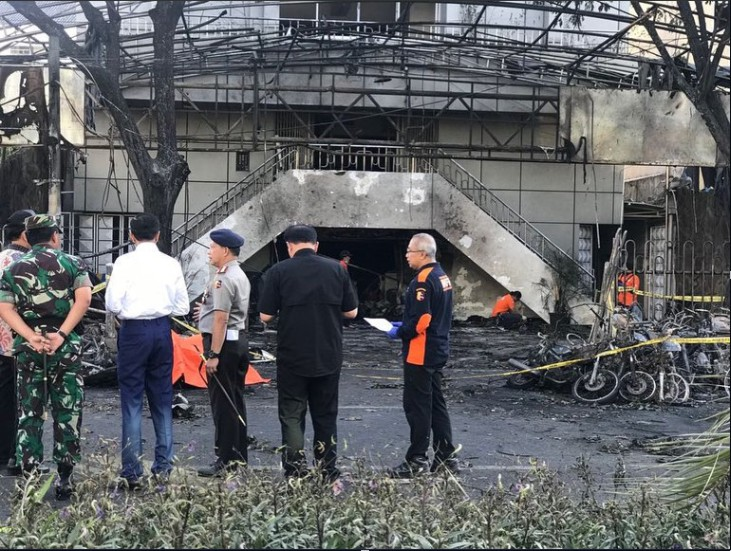
- From top, left to right: The 2002 Bali bombings memorial; Floral tributes in front of the Australian Embassy in Jakarta a few days after the 2004 bombing; Ritz-Carlton Hotel damaged by suicide bomb attack in July 2009; Armed Brimob police officers during the 2016 Jakarta attacks; Police post damaged by suicide bomb attack in front of the Sarinah mall; Indonesian President Joko Widodo (in white) visiting one of the churches that were attacked by terrorists in May 2018
Date	28 March 1981 – present (45 years, 7 months, 2 weeks and 4 days)
Location	Indonesia
Status	Ongoing; The main terrorist organisations mostly ended up as: Jemaah Islamiyah designated as a terrorist organisation in 2002; Abu Bakar Ba'asyir arrested in 2010; Indonesia launches Operation Madago Raya, a joint operation by the police and the armed forces; Darul Islam resurfaces in 2022; No Islamist terrorist incidents since 2023; Jemaah Islamiyah announces disbandment in 2024

Belligerents
Indonesia; Indonesian National Armed Forces; Koopssus; BAIS; Indonesian Army; Kostrad; Kopassus; Tontaipur; Indonesian Navy; Indonesian Marine Corps; Denjaka; Indonesian Air Force; Korpasgat; Bravo Detachment 90; Indonesian National Police; Mobile Brigade Corps; Detachment 88; Indonesian State Intelligence Agency	Islamist groups: Komando Jihad (1970s–1980s); Hizb ut-Tahrir Indonesia branch (1983–2017); Khilafatul Muslimin (1997–2023); Jemaah Islamiyah (2000–2024); Jamaah Ansharut Tauhid (2008–2014); Laskar Jihad (2000–2002); Mujahidin Tanah Runtuh (2001–2007); Indonesian Mujahedeen Council; East Indonesia Mujahideen (2010–2022); West Indonesia Mujahideen (2012–2013); Abu Uswah network (2012–2013); Katibah Nusantara (2014–2019); Turkistan Islamic Party (2014–2016); Indonesian People's Da'wah Party (2021–2025); Darul Islam Indonesia (since 2022); Jamaah Ansharusy Syariah; Jamaah Ansharut Daulah; Mujahedeen KOMPAK (1988–?); Separatists: Free Aceh Movement (1976–2005); Din Minimi warband (2014–2015); Free Papua Movement; West Papua National Liberation Army (TPNPB, 1971–present); West Papua Revolutianary Army (TRWP, until May 2019); West Papua National Army (TNPB, until May 2019); West Papua Army (WPA, 2019–present) (Note: formed as a merger between the 3 preceding Papuan independence military wings: TPNPB, TRWP, and TNPB and operating under United Liberation Movement for West Papua (ULMWP). However, TPNPB later denied they have recognized ULMWP nor agreed with the formation of WPA.); Various neo-Nazi groups (Since 2025)

Commanders and leaders
Indonesia: Prabowo Subianto (President); Gibran Rakabuming Raka (Vice President); Dudung Abdurachman (Coordinating Ministry for Political and Security Affairs); Sjafrie Sjamsoeddin (Ministry of Defence); Agus Subiyanto (Commander of the Armed Forces); Tandyo Budi Revita (Chief of Staff of the Army); Muhammad Ali (Chief of Staff of the Navy); Mohamad Tony Harjono (Chief of Staff of the Air Force); Suyudi Ario Seto (Chief of the Police); Muhammad Herindra (Director of State Intelligence); Former: Suharto; B.J. Habibie; Abdurrahman Wahid; Megawati Sukarnoputri; Susilo Bambang Yudhoyono; Joko Widodo; Adam Malik; Umar Wirahadikusumah; Sudharmono; Ma'ruf Amin; Maraden Panggabean; Muhammad Jusuf; L. B. Moerdani; Try Sutrisno; Edi Sudrajat; Feisal Tanjung; Wiranto; Widodo Adi Sutjipto; Endriartono Sutarto; Djoko Suyanto; Djoko Santoso; Agus Suhartono; Moeldoko; Gatot Nurmantyo; Hadi Tjahjanto; Andika Perkasa; Yudo Margono	Islamists: Komando Jihad: Imran bin Muhammad Zein (executed); Hizb ut-Tahrir Indonesia branch: Rokhmat s Labib; Khilafatul Muslimin: Abdul Qodir Hasan Baraja (surrendered); Jemaah Islamiyah: Abu Bakar Ba'asyir (POW) (later released); Abdullah Sungkar †; Abu Rusdan (POW) (later released); Adung (POW) (later released); Zarkasih (POW) (later released); Para Wijayanto (POW) (later released); Riduan Isamuddin (POW); Abu Dujana (POW) (later released); Umar Patek (POW) (later released); Azahari Husin †; Noordin Mohammad Top †; Dulmatin †; Zulkarnaen (POW); Jamaah Ansharut Tauhid: Abu Bakar Ba'asyir (POW) (later released); Noordin Mohammad Top †; Laskar Jihad: Jafar Umar Thalib †; Mujahidin Tanah Runtuh: Hasanuddin (POW); Indonesian Mujahedeen Council: Abu Muhammad Jibril †; Muhammad Thalib; East Indonesia Mujahideen: Abu Wardah †; Daeng Koro †; Basri (POW); Ali Kalora †; West Indonesia Mujahideen: Abu Roban †; Abu Uswah network: Abu Uswah †; Katibah Nusantara: Abu Ibrahim al-Indunisiy †; Bahrun Naim †; Turkistan Islamic Party: Unknown; Indonesian People's Da'wah Party: Farid Okbah (POW) (later released); Darul Islam Indonesia: Unknown; Jamaah Ansharusy Syariah: Muhammad Achwan; Abdul Rahim; Abdul Roshid; Jamaah Ansharut Daulah: Aman Abdurrahman (POW); Marwan; Zainal Anshori (POW); Saiful Munthohir (POW); Mujahedeen KOMPAK: Unknown; Separatists: Free Aceh Movement: Hasan di Tiro (surrendered); Malik Mahmud; Zaini Abdullah; Abdullah Syafi'i †; Muzakir Manaf; Sofyan Dawood; Ayah Muni †; Ishak Daud †; Abu Arafah †; Din Minimi warband: Din Minimi (surrendered); Free Papua Movement: West Papua National Liberation Army (TPNPB); Goliath Tabuni; Terianus Satto; West Papua Army (WPA); Damianus Magai Yogi; Neo-Nazis: Unknown

Strength
Indonesian military and police in Operation Madago Raya: 3,000 In Insurgency in Aceh: 35,000–50,000 (2005) In Din Minimi warband hunt operation: unknown In Papua conflict: 30,000	Terrorist groups: Komando Jihad: Unknown; Hizb ut-Tahrir Indonesia branch: Unknown; Khilafatul Muslimin: Unknown; Jemaah Islamiyah: 6,000 (2021); Jamaah Ansharut Tauhid: 1,500–2,000 (2012); Laskar Jihad: 3,000 (2002); Mujahideen Tanah Runtuh: Unknown; Indonesian Mujahedeen Council: Unknown; East Indonesia Mujahideen: 40+(2016); West Indonesia Mujahideen: Unknown; Abu Uswah network: Unknown; Katibah Nusantara: Unknown; Turkistan Islamic Party: 12 (2014–2016); Indonesian People's Da'wah Party: Unknown; Darul Islam Indonesia: 1,400+ (2022); Jamaah Ansharusy Syariah: 2,000; Jamaah Ansharut Daulah: Unknown; Mujahedeen KOMPAK: Unknown; Total: 17,000 include family and symphatizer (est.In 2021); Separatists: Free Aceh Movement: 3,000 (2005); Din Minimi warband : 156; Free Papua Movement; West Papua National Liberation Army (TPNPB): 1,200–1,438 (2024, Indonesian Government claim); around 72,500 (2018, TPNPB claim) (Note: TPNPB claimed they have a total of 29 Regional Defense Command (Kodap) with around 2,500 active members in each Kodap.); West Papua Army (WPA): unknown

Casualties and losses
Police officers: (Note: total casualties from both counter terrorism operations and terrorist attacks): 49 killed (2000-2019) (Note: According to the Indonesian National Police: 2000-2015: 35 killed; 2016: 1 killed; 2017: 4 killed; 2018: 8 killed; 2019: 1 killed); 126 wounded (2000-2019) (Note: According to the Indonesian National Police: 2000-2015: 67 wounded; 2016: 11 wounded; 2017: 14 wounded; 2018: 23 wounded; 2019: 11 wounded); In Operation Madago Raya: 18 killed In Insurgency in Aceh: 147 killed In Din Minimi warband hunt operation: 2 killed In Papua Conflict: 72 soldiers (mostly non-combat) and 34 policemen killed (2010 – March 2022); 39 soldiers and 17 policemen killed (2023–2025)	Islamist groups: at least 173 killed (2001–2019); At least 20 killed (2021–2023) 3,343 suspects arrested (2000–2025) (Note: According to the Indonesian National Police and the National Counter Terrorism Agency: 2000-2015: 1,064 arrested; 2016: 170 arrested; 2017: 176 arrested; 2018: 396 arrested; 2019: 297 arrested; 2020: 228 arrested; 2021: 370 arrested; 2022: 247 arrested; 2023: 148 arrested; 2024: 196 arrested; 2025: 51 arrested): 1,031 jailed (2022); 2,059 released (2024); 126 executed (2000–2017); At least 121 terror suspect Killed by torture from 2007 until 2016 (Amnesty International); Separatists: Free Aceh Movement: 15,000 military and civilians killed; Din Minimi warband: 6 killed 150 captured or surrender; Free Papua Movement: At least 38 killed (2010 – March 2022) Cartenz's Peace task force source: 272 killed (2021–2025) 1,384 captured (until 2025); Neo-Nazists: (Schutzstaffel) At least 1 wounded (Jakarta school bombing), and 5 captured

Terrorism in Indonesia refer to acts of terrorism that take place within Indonesia or attacks on Indonesian people or interests abroad. These acts of terrorism often target the government of Indonesia or foreigners in Indonesia, most notably Western visitors, especially those from the United States and Australia.

In June 2015, Indonesia was taken off the Financial Action Task Force blacklist of 'Non-Cooperative Countries or Territories' (NCCTs) due to Indonesia no longer being non-cooperative in the global fight against money laundering and terrorist financing. That gives Indonesia the same status as other major economies in the G20.

== Suspects ==
Traditionally militias politically opposed to Indonesian government interests have been held responsible for terrorist attacks in Indonesia. Separatist and violent rebel movements operating in Indonesia, such as the Darul Islam, the Communist Party of Indonesia, Fretilin (East Timorese independence militia during the Indonesian occupation of East Timor), the Free Aceh Movement, and the Free Papua Organisation were often held responsible for terrorist attacks, such as bombings and shooting. Recent terrorism in Indonesia can in part be attributed to the al-Qaeda-affiliated Jemaah Islamiyah Islamist terrorist group and/or Islamic State.

Indonesia has worked with other countries to apprehend and prosecute perpetrators of major bombings linked to militant Islamism. Since 2003, a number of 'western targets' have been attacked. Victims have included both foreigners — mainly Western tourists — as well as Indonesian civilians. Terrorism in Indonesia intensified in 2000 with the Philippine consulate bombing in Jakarta and Jakarta Stock Exchange bombing, followed by four more large attacks. The deadliest killed 202 people (including 164 international tourists) in the Bali resort town of Kuta in 2002. The attacks, and subsequent travel warnings issued by other countries, severely damaged Indonesia's tourism industry and foreign investment prospects. However, after the capture and killing of most of its key members and leaders, most notably Imam Samudra, Amrozi, Abu Dujana, Azahari Husin, and Noordin Mohammad Top, the terrorist cells in Indonesia have become less significant.

Since 2011, terrorist attacks seemed to shift from targeting foreign Western interests and residents to attacking Indonesian police officers. The Indonesian Police had success in cracking down on terrorist cells, and in retaliation a new terrorist cell, identified as the "Cirebon Cell", began targeting police officers. On 15 April 2011 a suicide bomber detonated an improvised explosive device in a mosque in a police compound in the city of Cirebon, West Java, during Friday prayers. The bomber was killed and at least 28 people were injured. The same cell was also suspected of being involved in two more attacks in Solo, the suicide bombing of a church on 25 September 2011, and a shooting targeting police on 17 August 2012. However these attacks were not as well-prepared and high scaled as previous attacks organised by Jemaah Islamiyah.

Although the number of terrorist attacks seem to have reduced in both number and scale, some terrorist hotspots such as Poso, Central Sulawesi, remain. the Poso region was previously marred by religious violence between Muslims and Christians in the area. On 16 October 2012, Police discovered two corpses of murdered police that had been missing for three days in Tamanjeka village, Poso Regency, Central Sulawesi. The victims went missing during an investigatory mission to a suspected terrorist training ground in a forest the Poso area.

Similar attacks targeting the Indonesian authorities, especially police officers, have also occurred in Papua, however these are not linked with Islamist terrorist cells, but rather with the Papuan separatist movement Organisasi Papua Merdeka. On 8 April 2012, a Trigana Air PK-YRF airplane was shot at by unidentified gunmen during a landing approach on Mulia airstrip, Puncak Jaya, Papua. A Papua Pos journalist, Kogoya (35), was killed in this shooting. On 27 November 2012, three policemen stationed at the remote Pirime police post, Jayawijaya, Papua, were killed in an attack by a group of unidentified men. Police suspected the Papua separatist movement was behind the attack.

In 2025, after Jakarta school bombing, Neo-Nazi terrorism activities become another challenge to the Indonesian security because their capability in mobilizing children and teenagers as their terror actors. On 30 December 2025, Police also uncovered 5 individuals that manned an unnamed Neo-Nazi network, which planned to indoctrinate 110 children and teenagers from 23 provinces by recruiting them through the Terrorgram circle "True Crime Community" and violent games as result of the follow up and investigation of the bomber's internet circles.

== Political and community responses ==
Subsequent bombings in the centre of Jakarta, in which all but one victim were ordinary Indonesians, shocked the public and brought swift responses from the Indonesian security forces. Even the most reluctant politicians had to admit that the evidence pointed to a small group of Islamist agitators. The Jakarta bombings and legal prosecutions helped shift public opinion away from the use of extremist Islamic political violence, but also increased the influence of intelligence bodies, the police and military whose strength had diminished since 1998.

Political factors clouded Indonesian responses to the "war on terror"; politicians were at pains not to be seen to be bowing to US and Australian opinion. Even the term "Jemaah Islamiyah" is controversial in Indonesia as it means "Islamic community/congregation", and was also the subject of previous "New Order" manipulation.

== Effects ==
The attacks, and subsequent travel warnings issued by other countries including the United States and Australia, severely damaged Indonesia's tourism industry and foreign investment prospects. Bali's economy was a particularly hard hit, as were tourism based businesses in other parts of Indonesia. In May 2008, the United States government decided to lift its warning. In 2006, 227,000 Australians visited Indonesia and in 2007 this rose to 314,000.

== Counter-terrorism ==
Detachment 88 is the Indonesian counter-terrorism squad, and part of the Indonesian National Police. Formed after the 2002 Bali bombings, the unit has had considerable success against the jihadi terrorist cells linked to the Central Java-based Islamist movement Jemaah Islamiah.

Within three months after the 2002 Bali bombing, various militants, including the attack's mastermind Imam Samudra, the notorious 'smiling-bomber' Amrozi, and many others were apprehended. Imam Samudra, Amrozi, and Amrozi's brother Ali Ghufron were executed by firing squad on 9 November 2008.

On 9 November 2005, bomb expert and senior player in Jemaah Islamiyah, Malaysian former university lecturer Dr. Azahari Husin, along with two other militants were killed in a raid on a house in Batu, East Java.

The police forces uncovered JI's new command structure in March 2007 and discovered a weapons depot in Java in May 2007. Abu Dujana, suspected leader of JI's military wing and its possible emir, was apprehended on 9 June 2007.

By May 2008, Indonesian police had arrested 418 suspects, of which approximately 250 had been tried and convicted. According to sources within Detachment 88, the JI organisation had been "shrunk", and many of its top operatives had been arrested or killed.

On 17 July 2009, two blasts ripped two Jakarta hotels, JW Marriott and Ritz-Carlton, killing seven. It was the first serious attack for the country in five years. The police stated that it was committed by a more radical splinter group of JI, led by the man then dubbed as the most wanted terrorist in Southeast Asia, Noordin Mohammad Top. Top was killed in a raid two months later on 17 September 2009, in Solo, Central Java. All members of his cell were either killed or captured, including the recruiter and field coordinator of the attack, Ibrohim, killed on 12 August 2009, and the one said to be his successor, Syaifudin Zuhri, killed on 9 October 2009. After Top, many believed that terrorism in Indonesia had run out of charismatic leaders, and grew insignificant. According to South East Asian terrorism expert and director of the South East Asia International Crisis Group, Sidney Jones, Top's death was "a huge blow for the extremist organizations in Indonesia and the region".

On 9 March 2010, Dulmatin, a senior figure in the militant group Jemaah Islamiyah (JI) and one of the most wanted terrorists in Southeast Asia was killed in a police raid in Pamulang, South Tangerang by Detachment 88.

In May 2018, The House of Representatives (DPR) and the government agreed to ratify the draft revision of Law Number 15 of 2013 concerning the Eradication of Criminal Acts of Terrorism (the Anti-terrorism Bill) into law. Previously, police have to wait for members of the suspected terror organisation to commit terrorism, in order to arrest them. The new anti-terrorism law gave the government the authority to identify and submit an organisation as a terrorist organisation to the court. In this new law, the membership to a terrorist cells or terrorist organisation groups, that have been established by the court, is enough to arrest and persecute a terrorist suspect, thus enabled the authority to perform preemptive measures prior to the terrorist attacks. Since then, the JAD (Jamaah Ansharut Daulah), JI (Jemaah Islamiyah), has been submitted as active terrorist groups in Indonesia, which membership to either of these organization will be prosecuted immediately by Indonesian law.

== List of attacks ==
Date	Prov.	Location	Deaths	Injuries	Type	Perpetrator	Description
28 March 1981	across provinces and countries	Garuda Indonesia Flight 206	6	2	Hijacking	Commando Jihad	-- Airports & airlines A group called Commando Jihad hijacked the DC-9 "Woyla" en route from Palembang to Medan, and ordered the crew to fly the aircraft to Colombo, Sri Lanka. The hijackers demanded the release of Commando Jihad members imprisoned in Indonesia, and US $ 1.5 million, as well as an aircraft to take those prisoners to an unspecified destination. During the siege at the Don Mueang International Airport in Bangkok, Thailand, One of the Kopassus commandos was shot, as was the pilot. The rest of the hostages were released unharmed. Two of the hijackers surrendered, but they were killed by the Kopassus commandos on the plane taking them back to Jakarta.
21 January 1985	Central Java	Borobudur	0	0	Improvised explosive device	Husein Ali Al Habsyie	-- Religious figures & institutions Nine stupas and Buddha statues on upper rounded terraces of Arupadhatu in Borobudur were badly damaged by nine bombs. See also: 1985 Borobudur bombing
15 March 1985	East Java	Banyuwangi	7	14	Improvised explosive device	Mochammad Achwan	-- Transport An explosive device, composed of TNT PE 808/Dahana type, detonated on board a bus that had been en route to Bali. Four passengers on the vehicle were killed, along with the three terrorists tasked with carrying out the attack. Mochammad Achwan was accused of providing the bombs for the attack, the intended target of the weapons the popular tourist beach at Kuta.
19 April 1999	Jakarta	Merdeka Square	0	4	Improvised explosive device	-	-- Religious figures & institutions Istiqlal Mosque.
1 August 2000	Jakarta	Menteng	2	21	Car bomb	-	-- Diplomatic A bomb detonated outside the official residence of the Philippines Ambassador to Indonesia, Leonides Caday, in Menteng, Jakarta. The bomb kills two and injured 21 others. See also: 2000 Philippine consulate bombing
14 September 2000	Jakarta	South Jakarta	15	27	Car bomb	Jemaah Islamiyah	-- Business A car bomb exploded in the basement of the Jakarta Stock Exchange, triggering a chain of explosions in which a number of cars caught fire. Most of the dead were drivers waiting by their employer's cars. See also: Jakarta Stock Exchange bombing
24 December 2000	West Java	Sukabumi	3	20	Improvised explosive device	Jemaah Islamiyah	-- Religious figures & institutions Gereja Sidang Kristos Church. See also: Christmas Eve 2000 Indonesia bombings
24 December 2000	West Java	Bandung	4	2	Improvised explosive device	Jemaah Islamiyah	-- Religious figures & institutions See also: Christmas Eve 2000 Indonesia bombings
24 December 2000	Jakarta	Jakarta	4	18	Car bomb	Jemaah Islamiyah	-- Religious figures & institutions Santo Yosef Church, See also: Christmas Eve 2000 Indonesia bombings
24 December 2000	Riau	Pekanbaru	5	8	Improvised explosive device	Jemaah Islamiyah	-- Religious figures & institutions Huria Kristen Batak Protestant Church. See also: Christmas Eve 2000 Indonesia bombings
10 May 2001	Jakarta	Setiabudi	2	2	Improvised explosive device	-	-- Government institutions Iskandar Muda Aceh Dormitory.
22 July 2001	Jakarta	Duren Sawit	0	43	Improvised explosive device	-	-- Religious figures & institutions Santa Ana Church.
3 April 2002		Ambon City	4	58	Improvised explosive device	-	-- Private citizens & property
5 June 2002	Central Sulawesi	Poso	5	17	Improvised explosive device	-	-- Transport See also: 2002 Poso bus attacks
12 July 2002	Central Sulawesi	Poso	1	5	Improvised explosive device	-	-- Transport See also: 2002 Poso bus attacks
8 August 2002	Central Sulawesi	Poso	1	4	Improvised explosive device	-	-- Transport See also: 2002 Poso bus attacks
4 September 2002		Ambon City	4	-	Improvised explosive device	-	-- Private citizens & property Stadium.
12 October 2002	Bali	Kuta Beach	202	250+	Truck bomb & suicide bomb	Jemaah Islamiyah	-- Private citizens & property (foreign tourists) The coordinated bomb attacks occurred on in the tourist district of Kuta, Bali. The attack was claimed as the deadliest act of terrorism in the history of Indonesia according to the current police general, killing 202 people, (including 88 Australians, and 38 Indonesian citizens). A further 240 people were injured. Various members of Jemaah Islamiyah, a violent Islamist group, were convicted in relation to the bombings, including three individuals who were sentenced to death. See also: 2002 Bali bombings
5 December 2002	South Sulawesi	Makassar	3	15	Suicide bombing	Laskar Jundullah Islamic Militia	-- Private citizens & property Three people, including the suicide bomber, were killed when a bomb detonated in the McDonald's restaurant at the Ratu Indah shopping mall. Galazi bin Abdul Somad, a member of the Laskar Jundullah Islamic Militia, was sentenced to eighteen years in prison for his role in this attack. See also: 2002 Makassar bombing
26 April 2003	Jakarta	Soekarno–Hatta International Airport	0	11	Improvised explosive device	Jemaah Islamiyah	-- Private citizens & property Bomb allegedly set by the Jemaah Islamiyah terrorist group detonates at a Kentucky Fried Chicken restaurant in Indonesia's main airport, injuring eleven people.
5 August 2003	Jakarta	Setiabudi	12	150	Car bomb	Jemaah Islamiyah	-- Private citizens & property (foreign tourists) A suicide bomber detonated a car bomb outside the lobby of the JW Marriott Hotel, killing twelve people and injuring 150. The hotel located in Mega Kuningan, South Jakarta, Indonesia. All those killed were Indonesian with the exception of one Dutch businessman, one Danish, and two Chinese tourists. See also: 2003 Marriott Hotel bombing
31 December 2003	Aceh	Peureulak	10	45	Improvised explosive device		-- Private citizens & property The bombing occurred during a concert at a night market in Peureulak, Aceh, killed at least 10 people, including three children, and wounded 45 others. The Indonesian military blamed Free Aceh Movement (GAM) for the attack. See also: 2003 Aceh New Year's Eve bombing
10 January 2004	South Sulawesi	Palopo	4	3	Improvised explosive device	-	-- Private citizens & property See also: 2004 Palopo cafe bombing
9 September 2004	Jakarta	Setiabudi	9	150	Car bomb	Jemaah Islamiyah	-- Diplomatic A one-tonne car bomb, which was packed into a small delivery van, exploded outside the Australian embassy at Kuningan District, South Jakarta, at about 10:30 local time (03:30 UTC), killing 9 people including the suicide bomber, and wounding over 150 others. Jemaah Islamiyah claimed responsibility for the attack. See also: 2004 Australian Embassy bombing in Jakarta
13 November 2004	Central Sulawesi	Poso	6	3	Improvised explosive device	-	-- Transport Six people were killed and three were injured when an improvised explosive device planted in a bus exploded in Poso, Central Sulawesi. See also: 2004 Poso bus bombing
^{28 May 2005}	Central Sulawesi	Tentena	22	90	Improvised explosive device	-	-- Private citizens & property Two improvised explosive devices, set to explode 15 minutes apart, detonated during the morning at a market in the center of Tentena, Central Sulawesi, killing 22 and wounding at least 40 more. See also: 2005 Tentena market bombings
1 October 2005	Bali	Kuta Beach & Jimbaran	23	100	Suicide bombing	Jemaah Islamiyah	-- Private citizens & property (foreign tourists) Series of suicide bomb and a series of car bombs exploded at two sites in Jimbaran Beach Resort and in Kuta, Bali. The terrorist attack claimed the lives of 20 people and injured more than 100 others. The three bombers also died in the attacks. See also: 2005 Bali bombings
31 December 2005	Central Sulawesi	Palu	8	53	Nail bomb		-- Private citizens & property An improvised explosive device detonated within a butcher's market in Palu, Central Sulawesi, killing eight people and wounding a further 53. See also: 2005 Palu market bombing
17 July 2009	Jakarta	Setiabudi	9	53	Suicide bombing	Jemaah Islamiyah	-- Private citizens & property (foreign tourists) The JW Marriott and Ritz-Carlton Hotels in Jakarta were hit by separate suicide bombings five minutes apart. Three of the seven victims who were killed were Australians, two from the Netherlands, and one each from New Zealand and Indonesia. More than 50 people were injured in the blasts. See also: 2009 Jakarta bombings
15 April 2011	West Java	Cirebon	1	26	Suicide bombing	-	-- Government institution A suicide bomber detonated an explosive device in a mosque in a police compound in the city of Cirebon, in West Java, during Friday prayer. The bomber was killed and at least 28 people were injured. See also: 2011 Cirebon bombing
25 September 2011	Central Java	Solo	1	14	Suicide bombing	-	-- Religious figures & institutions A suicide bomb exploded in Bethel Injil Church in Sepenuh, Solo, Central Java. The blast killed the bomber and injured 14 people.
16 October 2012	Central Sulawesi	Poso	2	0	Small arms fire	-	-- Government institution Police discovered two corpses of murdered policemen that has been missing three days earlier in Tamanjeka village. The pair went missing during investigation mission on suspected terrorist training ground in a Poso Regency forest.
2 June 2013	Central Sulawesi	Poso	1	1	Suicide bombing	-	-- Government institution
14 January 2016	Jakarta	Central Jakarta	5	24	Suicide bombing, multiple explosions and shooting spree	ISIL	-- Government institution (police) and expatriates At least three militants reportedly detonated explosives in or near a Burger King restaurant in central Jakarta. The militants then threw a grenade at a police post nearby, destroying the post and killing at least 3 people. Gunfire had ensued when police arrived shortly afterwards. See also: 2016 Jakarta attacks
24 May 2017	Jakarta	East Jakarta	5	11	Suicide bombings	ISIL	-- Government institution (police) Two explosions occurred at a bus terminal in Kampung Melayu, East Jakarta. Police confirmed that the explosions were caused by multiple explosive devices found in the toilet and in another part of the terminal. The bombings killed 5 people, 3 policemen and 2 attackers. The 11 injured people were taken to multiple hospitals across the Eastern Jakarta area. See also: 2017 Jakarta bombings
25 June 2017	North Sumatra	Medan	1	1	Stabbing	ISIL	-- Government institution (police) Two perpetrators stabbed a police officer to death at his post in Medan, North Sumatra . Other officers soon responded and killed one assaliant while arresting another.
23 June 2017	Jakarta	South Jakarta	1	2	Stabbing	ISIL	-- Government institution (police) An Islamic assailant reportedly attacked two police officers at a mosque near the National Police headquarters in South Jakarta.
8 to 10 May 2018		Depok	6	4	Terrorist prison standoff	ISIL	-- Government institution (police) Terrorist inmates in a detention center staged a riot resulting in the death of 5 police officers and one inmate. The detention center is the heavily guarded compound of the local headquarters of the Mobile Brigade Corps, a paramilitary unit of the National Police, and it was guarded by elite counter-terrorism officers. See also: 2018 Mako Brimob standoff
13 May 2018		Surabaya	28	40	Suicide bombings	Jamaah Ansharut Daulah	-- Religious figures & institutions 3 suicide bombs exploded in Innocent Saint Mary Catholic Church (Ngagel), Indonesia Christian Church (Diponegoro), and Surabaya Central Pentecost Church Church (Arjuno). All three churches are in Surabaya, East Java. The blasts killed all 13 of the bombers, 15 citizens and injured 57 people. See also: 2018 Surabaya bombings
13 May 2018		Surabaya	3	0	Suicide bombings	-	-- Private citizens & property A family was killed in this incident. It was suspected that they were making suicide bombs when the bomb exploded. The only victims in this incident were the family (husband, wife and son). This incident happened in a public housing in Sidoarjo, Surabaya, East Java. Police suspected that it might be connected with the church bombings that happened earlier in that morning. See also: 2018 Surabaya bombings
14 May 2018		Surabaya	10	TBC	Suicide bombings	Jamaah Ansharut Daulah	-- Government institution (police) A police station was attacked by a suicide bomber riding a motorcycle, the attack happened at a police station in Surabaya at around 08:50 AM, West Indonesia Time. Ten people were reportedly killed, four of them were police checking on the entrance; the rest were civilians. See also: 2018 Surabaya bombings
16 May 2018	Riau	Riau	5	2	Vehicular attack, stabbing	Jamaah Ansharut Daulah	-- Government institution (police) A police station was attacked by five attackers with swords. They arrived at the police station using a car. One of the attackers drove off after hitting and killing a police officer with the car, while four others attacked using swords which then injured two police officers. Four of the attackers were later killed while the driver was captured by the police.
5 July 2018		Bangil	0	1	Improvised explosive device	Jamaah Ansharut Daulah	-- Private citizens & property Three bombs exploded in a house in the village of Pogar in Bangil in the Pasuruan district of East Java province, wounding a child. The owner of the bombs escaped, but his wife was arrested by the police.
10 October 2019		Menes, Pandeglang, Banten	0	1	Stabbing	Jamaah Ansharut Daulah	-- Government official (minister) Chief security minister Wiranto was stabbed by an assailant using a sharp weapon during a working visit to Menes, Pandeglang, Banten Province. A local police chief was also stabbed in the back. Following the incident, the Banten Police had arrested the perpetrators; one man and one woman. The perpetrators; Syahrial Alamsyah alias Abu Rara, and his wife Fitri Andriana, had allegedly been exposed to radical teachings and also an alleged Islamic State member that led them to perform the attack.
13 November 2019		Medan	1	6	Suicide bombings	Jamaah Ansharut Daulah	-- Government institution (police) Four police officers, a part-time worker and a civilian were injured in a suicide bombing by 24-year-old Rabbial Muslim Nasution in Medan's Police HQ. See also: 2019 Medan suicide bombing
28 March 2021		Makassar	2	20	Suicide bombing	Jamaah Ansharut Daulah	-- Religious figures & institution An explosion occurred at the Sacred Heart Cathedral, Makassar during a Palm Sunday service, killing at least two perpetrators and injuring 20 people. The attack was allegedly carried out by an Islamic terrorist group Jamaah Ansharut Daulah. See also: 2021 Makassar cathedral bombing
31 March 2021	Jakarta	South Jakarta	1	0	Shooting	ISIL	-- Government institution (police) A 25-year-old female assailant attacked Indonesian National Police headquarters with an airgun and was shot dead by the police after she fired several rounds. No one was injured in the attack. According to the police, the attacker was an IS-affiliated lone wolf. See also: Indonesian National Police headquarters shooting
7 December 2022	West Java	Astana Anyar, Bandung	2	11	Suicide bombing	Jamaah Ansharut Daulah	-- Government institution (police) An JAD suicide bomber bombed Astana Anyar Police Station, killed 2 (including the suicide bomber) and wounded 11. See also: Astana Anyar bombing
7 November 2025	Jakarta	Kelapa Gading, Jakarta	0	97	School bombing	Neo-Nazi	-- Education institution A 17-year-old student school-bombed his own school, SMA Negeri 72 Jakarta (Public Senior High School 72 Jakarta) during Friday prayer, resulting in 97 wounded (including the perpetrator). While the attacker is a lone wolf, this became the first act of terrorism committed outside the Indonesian Islamic extremist groups, and the first committed under Neo-Nazi ideologies. See also: Jakarta school bombing
