= Umar Patek =

Indonesian terrorist (born 1966)

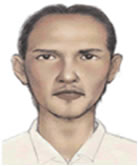
- Born: 1966 (age 59–60); Pemalang, Central Java, Indonesia
- Arrested: 25 January 2011; Abbottabad, Pakistan; Inter-Services Intelligence
- Citizenship: Indonesian
- Detained at: Porong Detention Center, East Java, Indonesia
- Other names: Umar Patek; Mike; Umar Arab; Anis Alawi Jafar; Pak Patek; Anis; Umar; Hisyam; Umar Kecil; Abu Syekh; Allawy; Jafar; Zacky; Arsalan; Abu Hisyam; Anis Al Alawi; Abdul Muis; Al Farouk; Umangis Mike; Mike Arsalan
- Charge(s): premeditated mass murder, Conspiracy to commit terrorism, harbouring information on terrorism, possession of explosives and firearms and two counts of document fraud
- Penalty: 20 years
- Status: Released

Hisyam bin Ali Zein, also known as Umar Patek (born 20 July 1966) is an Indonesian convicted terrorist and member of Jemaah Islamiyah who was wanted in the United States, Australia, and Indonesia on terrorism charges. There was a US$1 million reward offered by the Rewards For Justice Program for information leading to his capture.

In June 2012, Patek was convicted for his involvement in the 2002 bombings in Bali, Indonesia, which killed 202 people, and injured 209 others. On 7 December 2022, Patek was released from prison.

== Early life ==
Patek comes from Central Java and is a fourth-generation member of a family that traces its roots from Yemen.

== Militant activity ==
Patek says he first got involved in militant activities while working as a plantation worker in Johor Bahru, Malaysia in 1991, when he met senior Jemaah Islamiyah leader Huda bin Abdul Haq, also known as Mukhlas, who was later executed for his role in the Bali bombings. He says that Mukhlas offered him a job at an Islamic boarding school. After three months working there, Mukhlas urged him to continue his religious studies in Pakistan.

From 1991 to 1995, Patek stayed in Pakistan, initially residing in Peshawar. He received military training at mujahideen academies in Sadda and in Torkham, Pakistan, during which he says he became classmates with Ali Imron, one of the Bali bombers.

In 1995, Patek moved to Mindanao in the southern Philippines and stayed at the Moro Islamic Liberation Front (MILF) stronghold of Camp Abubakar. During this period he married his wife, who belongs to a Christian family. He says he was told to leave the camp after it was overrun by government forces in 2000 as he was told that he facially looked Middle Eastern. He subsequently returned to Indonesia.

== Involvement in attacks ==
=== Christmas Eve bombings ===
On his return to Indonesia, Patek stayed in Jakarta with Dulmatin, a JI bomb expert and one of the Bali bombers who was later killed in a police shootout. Patek was accused of mixing bombs that were used in attacks on churches in Jakarta as part of the Christmas Eve 2000 Indonesia bombings, although he denied this and said that he merely accompanied Dulmatin in dropping off the bombs at their designated targets on their way to Pemalang for Eid ul-Fitr.

=== Bali bombings ===
Patek said that he was asked by Dulmatin to accompany him in Bali in October 2002, arriving in a house that was full of bomb-making equipment. There, he met other JI leaders and suspects in the subsequent bombing such as Mukhlas, Imam Samudra, Joni Hendrawan and Azahari Husin. Patek claimed that he raised reservations with them over their planned attack, citing concerns over collateral damage and Muslim casualties, to which Imam Samudra, who planned the attack in retaliation for the Israeli occupation of Palestine and the Battle of Jenin, replied that "on the day of judgement, everyone would be judged individually for their actions based on their intentions." Patek said that he was prevented from further opposing the attack by Imam Samudra's locking of the house's front door. He later made the remaining 50 kilograms (110 pounds) of the explosives used in the attack.

== Capture and trial ==
Patek was captured by Pakistani security officials in Abbottabad on 25 January 2011 after a decade-long manhunt. Indonesian officials reported that Patek had confessed to playing a key role in the 2002 Bali bombings as well as a series of bombings on Christmas Eve in 2000. Ansyaad Mbai, the head of Indonesia's anti-terrorism agency, also told the Associated Press that Patek had "helped lead authorities to bin Laden." In May 2011, Indonesian Defense Minister Purnomo Yusgiantoro said that Patek was in Abbottabad with his wife with the purpose of meeting bin Laden, but an unnamed U.S. counterterrorism official dismissed this claim as a "coincidence" and told ABC News that the U.S. had no evidence that Patek was attempting to meet with the al-Qaeda leader Dawn earlier reported that Patek intended to travel to North Waziristan with two French militants.

There had been earlier false reports that he had been killed on 14 September 2006, in the Sulu province of the Philippines.

On 11 August 2011, Umar Patek was extradited from Pakistan to Indonesia where he was detained in Jakarta before a pending trial.

On 21 June 2012, an Indonesian court sentenced Patek to 20 years in prison for murder and bomb-making. He was found guilty of all six charges, which included involvement in the Christmas Eve bombings in 2000. Prosecutors did not seek the death penalty. During the trial, Patek apologized to families of victims and maintained that he did nothing more than mix chemicals for the explosives. Patek also stated that his target had always been Israelis and not "Westerners". He stated, "I questioned why in Bali? Jihad should be carried out in Palestine instead... Who were the victims, they were Westerners, they weren’t Israelis. In fact many Indonesians were victims. They had no link to Palestine."

== Release ==
After serving 10 years of his 20-year imprisonment, Patek was granted an early release for good behaviour in August 2022 as part of Indonesia's Independence Day celebrations, causing much anger in Australia. An Australian survivor who helped rescue injured people from the blast zone, Erik de Haart, expressed outrage on the Australian TV show Sunrise, reiterating Patek's role in making the explosives used in the attack.

In June 2025, Patek launched his own coffee brand, Ramu, in Surabaya. When one of the survivors of the Bali bombing, Husnul Khotimah, confronted him, he apologized to her and offered her a job at his coffee business.
