= 2011 Cirebon bombing =

Terrorist incident in Indonesia

Coordinates: 6°43′S 108°34′E

- Location: Cirebon, West Java, Indonesia
- Date: 15 April 2011; 15 years ago around 12:20 p.m. WIB (UTC+07:00)
- Target: Indonesian National Police compound's mosque
- Attack type: suicide bombing
- Deaths: 1 (perpetrator)
- Injuries: at least 28
- Perpetrator: Muhammad Syarif

On 15 April 2011, a suicide bomber detonated an explosive device in a mosque in a police compound in the city of Cirebon, in West Java, Indonesia. The attack occurred around 12:20 WIB (UTC+7) during Friday prayers.

The bomber was killed and at least 28 people were injured, most of whom were praying in the mosque.

== Background ==
Detachment 88 of the Indonesian National Police, the special unit for anti-terrorism, has been successful in capturing and killing numerous terrorist suspects, especially those affiliated with Jemaah Islamiyah. The bombing, which targeted the Police, marked a shift in terrorist attacks in Indonesia, as previous attacks have been targeted at symbols of Western influence such as hotels (2003 and 2009 Marriott bombings), embassies (2004 Australian embassy bombing), or tourist areas (2002 and 2005 Bali bombings).

The target of the attack is Az-Zikra mosque in the local Police office compound. Like most mosques in Indonesia, the mosque in the police compound did not have any security. It is Indonesia's first terrorist attack after two years of peace following 2009 Jakarta bombings.

== Bombing ==
The bomber arrived in the mosque approximately 12.10 when the khatib was finishing the sermon. The perpetrator was approximately 25 to 30 years old and 165–170 cm tall and carried a backpack. The bomber showed up in the mosque wearing a full black dress, and concealed the explosives behind his black jacket. The bomber was probably targeting the Cirebon police chief, Adjutant Senior Commander (Police) Herukoco, since he chose to stand near him.

As the imam leading the prayer, the bomber detonated his explosives. Following the loud explosion, the bomber is killed with his stomach destroyed. The explosion injured at least 28 victims. Most of these are the praying police officers, while one is a civilian who happen to use the mosque for Friday prayer. Most of the victims are injured from nails and screws attached to the bomb. The victims -including the police chief of Cirebon, were evacuated to the nearby hospitals.

== Reactions ==
Following the attack, Indonesian police increased security in all of it regional branches. Street merchants, which have been a common feature in front of Indonesian Police stations, have been banned temporarily. Indonesian Police sent a forensic team from West Java Police to identify the perpetrator. Detachment 88 anti-terrorism unit has also deployed. According to early observation Al Qaeda (with its local Jemaah Islamiyah affiliates) could be behind the attack.

Security analyst predict that the attack was revenge for Indonesian Police clampdown on terrorism, as several high-profile militants suspected of involvement in past bombings in Indonesia have recently been arrested or killed by the police.

The attack was condemned by various leaders and public figures in Indonesia. Indonesian President Susilo Bambang Yudhoyono strongly condemned the attack and called on the society as a whole to work together to eradicate terrorism. Religious Affairs Minister Suryadharma Ali, who is also chairman of United Development Party (PPP) urged the public not to be provoked by the terrorist attack. Governor of West Java province, Ahmad Heryawan also condemned the bombing and urged the police to completely investigate the attacks.

Nahdlatul Ulama, the largest Muslim organization in the country condemned the attack. The organization's chairman Said Aqil Siradj called the attack "very irresponsible" and concurring the observation that terrorism has shifted from aiming at western symbols to focusing on domestic targets.

== Investigation ==
The body of the perpetrator is badly mangled but his head is still intact, enabling the Police to obtain his face photograph. This photograph was released in order to identify the suspect. After the photo was released it was identified as Muhammad Syarif, 24, a Cirebon resident. He was identified by his mother, who came forward hours after the police released the photo. This identification was confirmed by the suspect's family and his neighbors. His identity is further confirmed by DNA test. Syarif was said to be often joined protests held by a hardline Islamic group in Cirebon, the Anti-Apostasy and Nonbelievers Movement, but was not a member.

Link with terrorist networks and motives for the attack is still being investigated.
