= 2017 Jakarta bombings =

Terrorist attacks in Jakarta, Indonesia

- 2017 Jakarta bombings (Jakarta) 2017 Jakarta bombings (Indonesia) Attack site shown on a map of Indonesia
- Location: 6°13′45.56″S 106°51′07.38″E; Jakarta, Indonesia
- Date: 24 May 2017; 9 years ago 9:00 – 9:05 WIB (UTC+07:00)
- Attack type: Suicide bombings
- Deaths: 5 (including both perpetrators)
- Injuries: 11
- Perpetrator: Islamic State
- No. of participants: 2 perpetrators: Ahmad Sukri; Ichwan Nurul Salam
- Motive: Islamist extremism

On 24 May 2017, two explosions occurred at a bus terminal in Kampung Melayu, East Jakarta. Police confirmed that the explosions were caused by multiple explosive devices found in the toilet and in another part of the terminal. The bombings killed five people: three policemen and two attackers. The 11 injured people were taken to multiple hospitals across the Eastern Jakarta area.

The attack occurred just two days after an ISIS-linked suicide bombing targeting concert-goers occurred in Manchester, United Kingdom, which killed 22 people and occurred on the day after government clashes with ISIS-linked militants began in Marawi, Philippines.

According to the Indonesian Police Watch, the attack was the deadliest attack on the Indonesian National Police. This was later surpassed in 2018 when a standoff between police officers and terrorists occurred in Mako Brimob.

== Attack ==
The first explosion occurred on 9:00pm near a toilet. Some people thought that the explosion was a truck tire burst and claimed that they smelled 'sharp chemical scent' in the immediate aftermath of the first explosion. The second explosion occurred approximately five minutes after the first explosion, in the front of the Kampung Melayu terminal. The second explosion was caught on camera as people finally realized that this was an attack.

The explosions occurred while the police were guarding a parade, although the parade had not yet passed when the blast happened. Hundreds of panicked people ran away from the blast area. Passengers of Transjakarta, who were disembarking from the bus, entered the bus again after the second explosion. Streets were jammed immediately after the blast and Police and emergency services were immediately dispatched into the vicinity. Police found multiple limbs and body parts in the area of the blast.

Five people were killed and 11 people were injured. Five of the injured were police officers. The injured were taken to Jatinegara Premier Hospital and Hermina Hospital. The police prepared four body bags and several hearses went to the blast site.

=== Aftermath ===
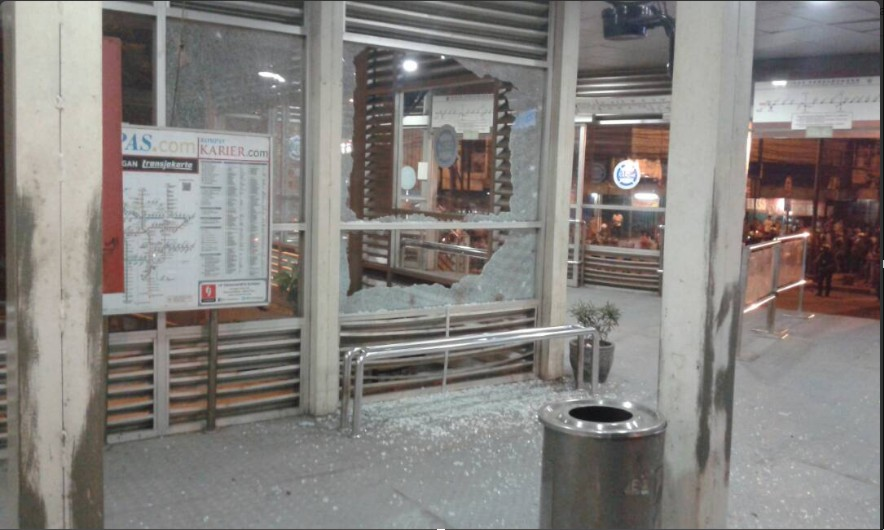
Damages on the terminal shortly after the blast

Photos of mutilated bodies and a severed head of the suspected attacker were widely circulated on social media, leading psychologists to express concern and ask the government to censor such photos, on the basis that sharing graphic photos could be disrespectful to the affected families and cause stress. The National Agency for Combating Terrorism later advised people to not share such photos as 'doing such action would please the terrorists'. This phenomenon also occurred after the attack in Thamrin in 2016. Subsequently, the #PrayForJakarta and #KamiTidakTakut (English: #WeAreNotAfraid) hashtags immediately went viral on Twitter Indonesia.

Facebook activated its safety check shortly after the blast.

Kampung Melayu bus terminal was immediately closed until further notice by the police due to the blast. The terminal suffered minimum damage, but the toilet was 'significantly damaged'. At least 4 public transportation and numerous motorcycles were damaged in the blast.

Road closures occurred in several main roads in Jakarta due to the blast. The Otto Iskandardinata road intersection was closed by the police. The police dispatched heavily armed police officers to the bridges and roads in the surrounding area.

== Casualties ==
5 people, including 2 suicide bombers, were killed in the blast. 11 others were injured, with injuries ranging from hearing loss to "catastrophic injury". The victims were recently promoted Police Officer Ridho Setiawan, Police Officer Taufan Tsunami and Police Officer Imam Gilang Adinata. Their bodies were repatriated to their families by the Indonesian National Police. The body of Ridho Setiawan was flown to Lampung and the body of Imam Gilang Adinata to Klaten.

== Investigation ==
A bomb squad was called onto the site and the terminal was cordoned by the police. The Indonesian National Police confirmed that the explosives were IEDs. Debris from the blast site indicated that the attackers were using pressure cookers in the attack. According to the police, the type of the bomb was similar to the one used in an attack on a local government office Bandung.

PT. Transjakarta offered to assist the investigation by handing over the CCTV recording of the attack, and later advised Transjakarta's commuters to report to Transjakarta staff and local authorities if they noticed someone or something suspicious had occurred.

Examination on the blast site revealed that during the attack the bombs might have been hidden under backpacks. The examination also revealed that the force of the bomb was nearly equally powerful to the one used on the Manchester Arena bombing two days prior. Both bombs were made from TATP.

=== Perpetrators ===
DNA test were conducted by the police with the results to be announced within 1 – 2 weeks. According to officials, the bodies of the perpetrators were heavily mutilated and barely recognizable.

During the examination of body of the suspected perpetrators, police found a receipt of the purchase of pressure cooker. This confirmed that the bombs were IEDs, being pressure cookers packed with explosive materials. The perpetrators purchased the pressure cookers on 22 May, two days before the attack, in a department store in Padalarang, Bandung.

On 25 May, a house in Cibangkong, Bandung was raided by police. The house was suspected to be the house of one of the suspected attackers. The raid was conducted at 07:30 local time. Police transported the attacker's wife and children to a nearby police station. Police secured the area and took several documents and books, including several 'Islamic books'. The police identified the first perpetrator of the attack, the owner of the house, as Ichwan Nurul Salam.

Police did not immediately link the attack to the previous attack in Cicendo, Bandung, but evidence from the blast site indicated that the attack had a major connection with the attack in Bandung. Police also stated that Salam's wife had been introduced to Salam by the Cicendo attacker Agus. Agus was arrested in Bandung in March 2017 on suspicion of terrorism, as being involved in the Purwakarta terror plot.

On the same day, the police announced that they suspected that both the attackers had a connection with ISIS. They added that the attackers probably had connections with Jamaah Anshar Daulah (JAD), an ISIS-linked terror group in Indonesia. Analysis by the police revealed that the target of the attack was the police, while Jamaah Anshar Daulah were known to have always attacked and terrorized the Indonesian National Police.

Police identified the second attacker as Ahmad Sukri. Police raided a house in West Bandung at 02:30 local time after his identity card was found on the attack site. Information gathered by neighbors revealed that Sukri had moved to Garut a few months before the attack. Ahmad's house in Bandung was cordoned and his mother, who was living with him in the house, was taken by the police for a DNA test.

On 26 May, ISIS claimed responsibility for the bombings. ISIS released a statement on their Amaq news agency website that the perpetrators were ISIS soldiers.

On 28 May, the Head of the Sinargalih Village where one of the terrorist (Ahmad Sukri) reside confirmed that his body will not be buried in the village. He confirmed that residents of the village refused to bury the terrorist and asked the family to bury his body in somewhere else.

From 24 May until 22 June, the Indonesian National Police arrested 41 people, 9 of whom were the main suspects of the bombings. The Indonesian National Police also confirmed that 26 people from the total 41 people had a connection with the JAD, the perpetrator of the 2016 Samarinda church bombing. 5 people were subsequently released by the police.

=== False accusation ===
In the immediate aftermath of the bombings, a photo of the identity card of the suspected attacker immediately went viral on social media. The suspected attacker was initially identified as Wiryawan Indra Wijaya, a resident of Panji Tengah Village, Sukabumi. However, this information was later declared to be false information and police denied that Wiryawan was one of the attackers. They explained that Indrawan accidentally dropped his identity card while helping survivors of the bombings.

Another identity card also went viral in the immediate aftermath of the bombings. The holder of the identity card was identified as Vicky Kurniyanto. Since his identity card was also accidentally dropped on the blast area, he was accused as a perpetrator of the bombings. Police later declared that he was not involved in the attack.

An ex-police officer from Medan was also accused as being one of the attackers. Police identified him as Rinton Girsang, an ex-police officer of the North Sumatra Regional Police. Most people believed that he was involved in the attack since he shared similar facial features with the photo of the severed head of the attacker, which went viral in the immediate aftermath. Police confirmed that he currently lives in Pontianak, West Kalimantan and denied his involvement in the bombings. Ginsang later made a video about his accusation and asked the public to stop involving him with the attackers.

=== Motive ===
The perpetrators were members of the Mudiriyah Bandung Raya, a terrorist group which had a connection with Bahrun Naim, the perpetrator of the 2016 Jakarta attacks. Bahrun Naim was an ISIS-affiliated terror group with a Tafkiri belief. Both the Mudiriyah Bandung Raya and Bahrun Naim shared this belief. The belief stated that the police was the group enemy number one and that the police were infidels. They were declared as infidels since the police halted, blocked and foiled terror plots. The police were also declared as infidels because the police would not accept the concept of caliphate in Indonesia, whereas the terror group praised the ideology of the caliphate. The police also stated that civilians, even fellow Muslims, that did not accept the ideology of caliphate in Indonesia were also called as infidels by the terror group.

== Reactions ==
=== Domestic ===
Indonesian President Joko Widodo appealed for calm, and later condemned the bombings, sending condolences to the families of the victims and ordering the police to crack down on terrorism.

President Joko Widodo, First Lady Iriana Widodo, Vice President Jusuf Kalla, Head of Indonesian National Intelligence Agency Budi Gunawan and Vice Head of Indonesian National Police Syafruddin visited the blast site on the night of 25 May 2017. During this visit, the President ordered that the Indonesian Representative Council should approve the anti-terrorism bill immediately. He added that Indonesians should gather in unity to fight terrorism and radicalization, stating that "there is no place in our country for terrorism to grow".

Numerous political figures and religious institutions also condemned the attack and offered their sincere condolences to the victims of the attack. The Vice Secretary of the United Development Party (PPP) Ahmad Baidowi condemned the attack, stating that "there are no religions that teach us to kill each other, especially Islam." The Indonesian Ulema Council followed the condemnation, stating that "violence in the name of any religion is a crime on humanity and can not be accepted or tolerated. No religions teach us to kill anyone." Islamic Group Muhammadiyah later joined the condemnation, stating that "the attack was a heinous, uncivilized attack." They later added that "terrorism knows no religion" and added to citizens to not link the attack to a specific religion.

The Minister of Maritime Affairs Luhut Binsar Pandjaitan also issued a written statement on his Facebook account, condemning such 'heinous acts on police and civilians', and added that Indonesian should stick together and arise to fight terrorism. Interior Minister Tjahjo Kumolo also condemned the bombings, asking Indonesians to stand up against radicalization in Indonesia and for unity.

The Jakarta Governor-elect Anies Baswedan condemned the attack, while Jakarta acting governor Djarot Saiful Hidayat visited the relatives of the victims of the attack. He advised Jakartans to not be afraid of terrorists and added that a terrorist is not an Indonesian and should not be in Indonesia.

Famous Indonesian singers and celebrities also voiced their condolences on the attack, including Raisa Andriana and Andien.

Head of the Indonesian Regional Representative Council Oesman Sapta sent condolences to the next of kin and condemned the attack. He asked the public to trust the investigation conducted by the government and appealed for calm. He also advised the public to "keep their heads low" since false information often occurs in the aftermath of such incident. The Head of Jakarta Council Prasetyo Edi Marsudi also condemned the bombings, stating that Jakartans should not be afraid in the face of terror.

The flag of Indonesia was flown in half-mast in several police institutions in Jakarta.

The head of the Indonesian National Police Tito Karnavian ordered the police to tighten the security around the Jakarta Metropolitan Area (Jabodetabek), while security at the Indonesian National Police Command Headquarters in North Jakarta was tightened. The Minister of Transportation Budi Karya Sumadi ordered the security of mass transportation stations in Indonesia to be tightened with immediate effect.

Officials stated that the recovery costs for the survivors of the blast would be paid entirely by the Indonesian National Police and the Jakarta Health Department.

=== International ===
Malaysian Prime Minister Najib Razak condemned the bombing. The Australian Prime Minister Malcolm Turnbull phoned Joko Widodo and conveyed his sincere condolences. He added that people should be vigilant in response to such an incident.

Government of United Kingdom issued travel advice for British nationals traveling to Indonesia. The Australian Government also issued travel advice for Australian citizens traveling to Indonesia. United States followed the same action for its citizens.

== Conspiracy theory ==
=== Inside job ===
The attack was viewed by several Muslim hardliner as an inside attack conducted by the Indonesian National Police. A Facebook post claimed that the attack was conducted by the Indonesian National Police as a diversion to the public, while numerous others claimed that the dead bodies were plastics or prosthetics. The "plastic-limbs"claim was evidenced by the footage of the aftermath, which showed a limb of one of the victims. This theory was debunked by the police and the survivors of the bombings. The police later criticized the public who supported the theory, stating that the public should have helped the police instead of accusing them with non-sense theory.

=== Possible revenge on Ahok ===
The attack occurred when police were guarding a parade held by the controversial Islamist group Islamic Defenders Front (FPI). This organization is notorious for its occasional hate crimes, and there have been many calls for the dissolution of the group.

Before the attack, FPI leader Rizieq Shihab had been accused of conducting a "sexting" with Firza Husein, challenging the Pancasila and alleged blasphemy on Christians. He maintained his innocence and claimed that the Indonesian police had framed him so he could be jailed, and this had caused him to flee to Saudi Arabia.

The FPI was known for their mass rally in response to the suspected blasphemy of Quran by Jakarta's former governor Basuki Tjahaja Purnama (famously known as Ahok). Basuki was later convicted guilty on 9 May and was sentenced to 2 years in prison. Many Indonesians stated that the group was responsible for Basuki's conviction.

Some members of the Islamic Defenders Front claimed that the attack was perpetrated by Basuki's supporter. The parade went on as planned. However, in the aftermath of the attack, participants of the parade demanded the assassination of Ahok. Young children who participated on the parade were also caught on camera shouting "Kill Ahok right now!". The video immediately went viral. Police later investigated the video.

== See also ==
- List of terrorist incidents in May 2017
- 2017 shooting of Paris police officers, a similar incident in which police officers were murdered and wounded by shooting.
