= Dulmatin =

Indonesian terrorist (1970–2010)

- Born: 6 or 16 June 1970; Pemalang Regency, Central Java, Indonesia
- Died: 9 March 2010 (aged 39); Pamulang, South Tangerang, Indonesia
- Other name: Abdul Matin; Abdul Martin; Muktamar; Novarianto; Amar Usmanan; Yahya Ibrahim; Yayat Ibrahim; Amar Umar; Amar Usman; Anar Usman; Joko Pitoyo; Joko Pitono; Pitono; Pitoyo; Potono; Pintono; Yahya; Yayat; Ibrahim; Topel; Djoko Supryanto; Jak Imron; Djoko; Joko; Matin; Mansyur; Anis; Noval; Genius
- Occupations: Jemaah Islamiyah explosives expert, Alleged mastermind of the 2002 Bali bombings
- Status: Deceased

Dulmatin (Note: He was also known as Amar Usmanan, Joko Pitoyo, Joko Pitono, Abdul Matin, Pitono, Muktarmar, Djoko, and Noval. He also had the nickname "Genius") (6 or 16 June 1970 – 9 March 2010) was a senior figure in the militant Islamic group Jemaah Islamiyah (JI) based in Indonesia, and one of the most wanted terrorists in Southeast Asia. Dulmatin was an ethnic Javanese with a height of 172 cm, weighing 70 kg, with a brown complexion.

According to the Jakarta Globe, when Dulmatin was a young man he attended a religious boarding school run by the founder of the Jemaah Islamiyah, Abu Bakar Bashir.

== Militant activity ==
Dulmatin had received training in al-Qaeda camps in Afghanistan. He was believed to have been the protégé of Azahari Husin, under whose guidance Dulmatin became an electronics specialist and bomb making expert. He participated in the car bomb attack on the Philippine ambassador in Jakarta on 1 August 2000, and assembled the timers for the Christmas Eve bombings on 24 December 2000, which killed 19 people. He was one of the masterminds behind the 2002 Bali bombings which killed 202 people. Working alongside Azahari, Dulmatin helped to assemble the car bomb and explosive vests used in the attack. He allegedly set off one of the bombs with a mobile phone.

He was believed to be with the Abu Sayyaf group in the Philippines since 2003, and was involved in providing explosives expertise and training other militants. From radio intercept and human intelligence, authorities believe that Dulmatin was wounded in a gun battle with the Philippines military in January 2007, on the southern island of Jolo. In May 2007, Dulmatin eluded capture when he fled from a safe house in Simunul island just hours before Philippine police and military forces raided the location. The authorities found four children believed to be Dulmatin's.

The United States government offered a reward of up to US$10 million for the capture of Dulmatin under the Rewards For Justice Program.

At the beginning of 2010 Dulmatin began training a group of militants in the foothills of Jalin, just south of Banda Aceh in Indonesia in an attempt to build a 'nerve centre for Southeast Asian terrorism' under the name 'Al-Qaeda of the Verandah of Mecca.' The group was quickly wiped out, beginning with police raids on 22 February 2010, when many were killed or arrested, and followed up with intelligence from local people and ex-rebels who banded against the non-Acehnese militants. Dulmatin was killed in a police raid in Pamulang, South Tangerang on 9 March 2010 by Detachment 88, Indonesia's special counter-terrorism unit.

== In media ==
=== Poetry ===
DulMatin DeMarco (EL Burlador De Pemalang Regency)
