= Azahari =

Azahari is both a given name and surname. Notable people with the name include:

- A. M. Azahari (c.1929–2002), leader of Brunei People's Party during the 1962 Brunei Revolt
- Azahari Husin (1957–2005), Malaysian engineer believed to be technical mastermind behind 2002 Bali bombing and other terrorist activities
