= Noordin Mohammad Top =

Malaysian terrorist (1968–2009)

- Noordin's FBI Photo
- Born: 11 August 1968; Kluang, Johor, Malaysia
- Died: 17 September 2009 (aged 41); Surakarta, Central Java, Indonesia
- Other names: Noordin Mat Top; Noordin Moch Top; Noordin Muh Top; Nur Din Bin Muhammad Top; Abdurrahman Aufi; Abu Mu'awwidz; Nurdin; Din Moch Top; Muh Top; Top M; Mat Top; Money Man
- Occupations: Financier, alleged trainer of the splinter group of Jemaah Islamiyah and Jamaah Ansharut Tauhid
- Spouse: Munfiatun
- Status: Deceased (2009)
- Penalty: None

Noordin Mohammad Top (Note: He was also referred to as Noordin, Din Moch Top, Muh Top, Top M or Mat Top) (11 August 1968 – 17 September 2009) was a Malaysian-born terrorist and extremist who was believed to have masterminded the series of terrorist attacks in Indonesia in the 2000s (including the Bali bombings in 2002 and 2005, as well as the Jakarta bombings in 2003, 2004 and 2009). Until his death, he was Indonesia's most wanted Islamist militant.

Noordin was born in Kluang, Johor, Malaysia. His father, Moch Top, was a Javanese immigrant to Malaysia. He is thought to have been a key bomb-maker and financier for Jemaah Islamiyah (JI) and Jamaah Ansharut Tauhid (JAT). Noordin was reported by the FBI to be "an explosives expert", and a bomb maker for the Jemaah Islamiah group.

Once in Indonesia, he married using the assumed name Abdurrahman Aufi. His wife, Munfiatun, was jailed in June 2005, for concealing information about his whereabouts.

Noordin (allegedly nicknamed Money man) specialized in making bombs and collecting funds for militant activities. Long after first being declared as wanted by Malaysian and Indonesian authorities, he was added to the FBI's third major wanted list in 2006: FBI Seeking Information - War on Terrorism list. He was killed during a police raid (by Indonesia's anti-terrorist unit Densus 88) in Surakarta, Central Java, conducted on 17 September 2009.

== Bombings ==
Noordin and Azahari were thought to have masterminded the Philippine consulate bombing, Jakarta Stock Exchange bombing, 2000 Christmas Eve bombings, 2002 bombings in Bali and Makassar, 2003 JW Marriott Hotel bombing in Jakarta, 2004 Australian embassy bombing in Jakarta, 2004 Poso bus bombing, 2005 Bali bombings, 2005 Tentena market bombings, 2005 Palu market bombing, and 2009 JW Marriott and Ritz-Carlton bombings again in Jakarta.

In August 2003, a suicide bomber detonated a car bomb outside the lobby of the JW Marriott Hotel in Jakarta, killing 12 people and injuring 150. Jemaah Islamiyah was suspected of responsibility for the bombing.

In September 2004, a car bomb was exploded outside the Australian embassy in Jakarta, killing several people including the suicide bomber and wounding over 140 others. Jemaah Islamiyah with Azahari Husin and Noordin M. Top were suspected of being behind the bombing.

In October 2005, bombs were detonated in Jimbaran and Kuta in Bali. The bombings killed 23 people, including three bombers trained by Noordin.

In July 2009, two suicide bombers killed seven people at the Ritz Carlton and JW Marriott hotels in Jakarta. Local anti-terrorism officials said that there were "strong indications" that Noordin M. Top was behind the attacks.

== Fugitive trail ==
On 21 July 2005, Irun Hidayat was convicted of being an accessory by providing a house to Azahari Husin and Noordin Top. Mbai identified the chief suspect in the 2005 attack as Azahari Husin, who was thought to collaborate with the second suspect Noordin, whose wife was sentenced to three years in prison for harbouring him. Although Noordin was connected to Jemaah Islamiyah, in January 2006 Indonesian police reported that he and Azahari had split away from the organisation to form "an even more hardline group". The latter had been set up around 2005 and reportedly bore the name "Al-Qaeda Jihad Organisation for the Malay Archipelago". Azahari Husin was later killed in a raid in November 2005. On 24 February 2006 the FBI added Noordin among three names to the Seeking Information – War on Terrorism list.

On 29 April 2006, he narrowly escaped capture after his safe-house was raided by heavily armed Indonesian police in Binangun, Central Java. In the altercation, Abdul Hadi and Jabir were killed. In June 2006 it was reported that Noordin was threatening more attacks in video tapes recovered by Indonesian authorities and police believe that he may have formed his own organization outside JI.

On 8 August 2009, there were media reports that he had been killed during a shooting with police near Temanggung, a village in Central Java. Forensic testing conducted by Indonesian police however, disproved this speculation. A body recovered from the ambush site was instead found to be Ibrohim, a key organiser of the 2009 Jakarta bombings.

== Death ==
Indonesian National Police Chief Bambang Hendarso Danuri announced on 17 September 2009, that Noordin was killed in a police raid along with three other terrorists. Police hunting for suspects in the bombings of July 2009 tracked the seven suspects to Solo in Central Java and besieged a village house in Mojosongo, Jebres District overnight. The raid ended near daybreak when an explosion was detonated inside the home. Four suspected militants were killed and three were captured. The operation left behind a charred house with no roof and blown-out walls. The bodies were flown to Jakarta for autopsies.

Among the four bodies recovered after the raid, one was identified as Noordin's; fingerprints taken from the Indonesian corpse matched samples obtained from Malaysia. A similarity was found in at least 14 minutiae points. On 19 September 2009, Indonesian National Police spokesperson announced that a DNA test was also carried out and it confirmed that the body was that of Noordin. According to a police intelligence officer, the renter of the house, "Susilo", Noordin's close associate Bagus Budi Pranoto, alias "Urwah", and Aryo Sudarso, alias Mistam Hisamuddin, were killed in the raid, along with Noordin. Police were led to the house after arresting Indonesian militant Rohmat Puji Prabowo at a marketplace in Solo on 16 September.

Sidney Jones, the South east Asia programme director of the International Crisis Group commented that Noordin's death was "a huge and deadly blow for the extremist organizations in Indonesia and the region", because "there isn't another radical leader in Indonesia who has given that same message so consistently."

== Marriages ==
During his exiles and escapes from police raids, Noordin married several women in Indonesia and had several children from those marriages.

He married Munfiatun AKA Fitri on 7 July 2004. Fitri was sentenced to three years in prison for protecting him. He also married an unidentified woman in Rokan Hilir, Riau, during his exile after the 2002 Bali bombings. Around 2007, he also married Ariani Rahma during his exile in Cilacap. One other unidentified woman was also believed to be Noordin's wife during his time in police custody. These marriages were believed to be a part of his strategy to socialize with the local people to keep his identity secret. His first wife was an Indonesian-born Malaysian woman, who now lives in Johor, Malaysia, with their son.
