= Jamaah Ansharut Tauhid =

Splinter cell of Jemaah Islamiyah formed in 2008

- جماعة انصار التوحيد
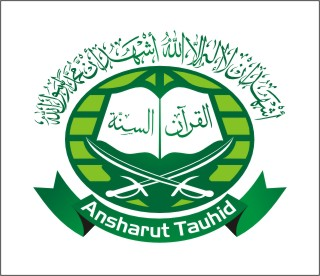
- Other name: JAT, Helpers of Tawhid Congregation
- Leaders: Abu Bakar Baasyir (founder), Mochammad Achwan (leader of splinter group Jamaah Ansharusy Syariah)
- Founded: July 27, 2008
- Dissolved: July 23, 2014
- Country: Indonesia
- Allegiance: (Disputed - formerly Al-Qaeda, some members pledged allegiance to ISIS)
- Headquarters: Solo, Java, Indonesia
- Active regions: Indonesia (including Aceh and Central Sulawesi)
- Ideology: Islamic extremism; Jihadism; terrorism
- Status: Designated as a terrorist organization by the UN and US
- Size: 1,500–2,000 (estimated in 2012, much smaller after split)
- Website: (Formerly maintained a website, now likely defunct)

Jamaah Ansharut Tauhid or Jemaah Anshorut Tauhid (Arabic: جماعة أنصار التوحيد, lit. 'Helpers of Tawhid Congregation', abbreviated as JAT) was a splinter cell of the Jemaah Islamiyah (JI) designated as a terrorist organization by the United Nations and the United States. The latter is most known for perpetrating the 2002 Bali bombings along with Azahari Husin and Noordin Mohammad Top, both Malaysian terrorist kingpin.

== History ==
Jamaah Ansharut Tauhid was formed by Abu Bakar Baasyir on 27 July 2008 in Solo, Java, Indonesia and has bases across Indonesia including in Aceh and Central Sulawesi.

In September 2011, a JAT suicide bomber detonated explosives in a central Java church, killing himself and wounding dozens of others.

On March 18, 2012, at least one of five armed men killed by Indonesian counter-terrorist forces in Bali was said to be a member of JAT. The men were killed while awaiting the arrival of prostitutes at a local hotel.

In 2012, the U.S. Department of State and the United Nations placed sanctions on the organization and named it as a terrorist group.

In 2012, the group was thought to have approximately 1,500–2,000 members.

The group remained very active in Indonesia in 2012, and it publicly maintained a website, as of January 2013. Abu Bakar Baasyir's son, Abdul Rohim Ba'asyir was said to be JAT's PR Chairman and had worked for al-Qaeda in Afghanistan in 2002.

In August 2014, the group suffered a split over Abu Bakar Baasyir's pledge of allegiance to Abu Bakr al-Baghdadi, leader of the Islamic State of Iraq and the Levant (ISIS). Many members of the group, including top leaders, and Baasyir's sons reportedly disagreed with this decision over ideological reasons and left to form a new group called Jamaah Ansharusy Syariah, led by Mochammad Achwan.

After 2014, the group was nearly defunct. From estimated 2,000 - 3,000 JAT members in 2014, only 5% that still pledged their allegiance to JAT's Abu Bakar Baasyir Faction. The organization eventually collapsed on 25 Ramadan 1435 H (23 July 2014), but its members and sympathizers still existed until the present day.
