= Jamaah Ansharusy Syariah =

- Jamaah Ansharusy Syariah
- Abbreviation: JAS
- Formation: 11 August 2014; 12 years ago
- Founded at: Bekasi, West Java
- Type: Mass organization
- Purpose: Religious and social
- Headquarters: Gedung Menara 165 Lt.4 Jl. TB Simatupang No.Kav.1, Cilandak Ps. Minggu Jakarta Selatan Jakarta
- Region served: Indonesia
- Members: 2000 (claimed) (2014)
- Official language: Arabic, Indonesian
- Secessions: from Jamaah Ansharut Tauhid
- Website: ansharusyariah.com

Jamaah Ansharusy Syariah (Arabic: جماعة أنصار الشريعة, literally Community of the Helpers of Sharia, JAS) is an Islamist organization split from Jamaah Ansharut Tauhid (literally Community of the Helpers of Tawhid, JAT). The organization described as splinter group of JAT, after Abu Bakar Ba’asyir expelled his sons and top aides from JAT following their refusal to support his pledge of support to the Islamic State (IS). JAS objective is the rival of JAT recruitment for followers in support of the full implementation of Sharia in Indonesia. JAS claimed a membership of 2,000 in Jakarta, West Java, Central Java, East Java, West Nusa Tenggara, and Bengkulu.

== Formation ==
The organization formed created in 2014 following Ba'asyir's pledge of loyalty to ISIS. The majority of the JAT leadership objected not only to Ba’asyir's decision but also to his failure to consult with them before taking such a step. Baasyir also requested anybody who not followed his pledge to ISIS should leave JAT. Muhammad Achwan, the acting JAT head during Ba’asyir's incarceration, along with two of Ba’asyir's sons, Abdul Rahim and Abdul Roshid, led a mass resignation from JAT and the setting up of JAS.

== Alleged terrorist activities ==
Despite JAS away from Islamic terrorism, some alleged terrorist acts by JAS members are also reported.

Unlike the former JAT, JAS, although holding the Salafi puritan view of Islam, they do not follow JAT extreme ways of Islamic terrorism. JAS also rejected ISIS proposed caliphate, claiming that ISIS way is far from the original Islamic concept. JAS, however, advocating the way of "Jihadocracy", using democratic tools for Jihad purposes and "Jihad Konstitusional" approach. "Jihad Konstitutional" is an Indonesian Islamist paradigm to promote and support Islamic right-wing politicians or sympathized politicians that supported the idea of implementation of Sharia in Indonesia in hope that installed politicians will change the laws to become more favorable for the Islamists and their agendas. During 2019 Indonesian general election, JAS, along with other Islamic right-wing organizations and groups supported figures and candidates that perceived to be more accommodating towards the formalisation of sharia law, either by employing religious sermons and gathering to promote politicians that supported them.

The organization also maintained presence in internet, with website, Facebook page, YouTube, and Instagram account relatively active. Unlike JAT, JAS actively active in public engagements and solidarity acts under the aegis of their Yanmas Division.

The organization also appointed Mochammad Achwan as their role model. He stated that JAS actively contributes by assisting and collaborating with the state in addressing societal issues and supporting the government in mitigating the impact of disasters in various regions of Indonesia."

JAS relatively away from and shunned terrorism and religious radical acts. In their statement in January 2022, they claimed already cooperated with Indonesian state apparatuses to discourage terrorism.

== Humanitarian Activities ==
The Community Service Division (Yanmas) of Ansharusy Syariah deployed volunteers to disaster-affected areas to assist residents impacted by flooding in the Dinar Indah housing complex, Meteseh Village, Tembalang District, Semarang, on Monday (18/1/2021). Volunteers not only helped clean up mud debris but also distributed ready-to-eat meals to residents in need. In addition, Yanmas Ansharusy Syariah also provided aid to victims of the Cianjur earthquake.

Since the first day of the Cianjur earthquake disaster on Monday (21/11/2022), Yanmas Ansharu Syariah has been actively assisting survivors. Every day, Yanmas Ansharu Syariah volunteers tirelessly carry out various activities, including evacuating victims, distributing aid, setting up public kitchens, and cleaning the homes of earthquake victims.

The earthquake that struck the Lombok area left a deep sorrow for the community, especially for children. In addition to losing their homes, which were destroyed by the powerful quake, they are now unable to receive proper education as they used to. Volunteers from Jamaah Ansharusy Syariah in the Nusa Tenggara region, along with Yamima partners, established an emergency school and mosque in Rempek Hamlet, Rempek Village, Gangga District, North Lombok Regency.

== Status ==
Indonesian National Counter Terrorism Agency listed JAS as suspected terrorist group, citing there is no significant difference between JAS and JAT. The agency also added the organization under their surveillance. Their status as surveilled organization also reconfirmed in 2018.

However, on 20 December 2023, Indonesian National Counter Terrorism Agency and Special Detachment 88 issued the report mentioned JAS as one of active Islamist terror organizations, along with Jemaah Islamiyah (JI), Jamaah Ansharut Daulah (JAD), Darul Islam (DI), and Abu Oemar Network (the last is JAD splinter faction attempted to interfere 2024 election process). In the report, JAS contributed to 7 out of 142 terrorists captured in 2023, just a few compared to other organizations. Due to its inclusion, JAS issued right of reply statement that assert the organization is not a terror organization and condemned the terrorism done by radicalized Muslims. JAS lamented their inclusion which is no legal basis.
