= 2016 Jakarta attacks =

Terrorist attacks in Indonesia

- Attack site shown on a map of Jakarta
- Location: 6°11′12.56″S 106°49′23.38″E; Jakarta, Indonesia
- Date: 14 January 2016; 10:40 – 15:30 WIB (UTC+07:00)
- Attack type: Suicide bombings, shootout, terrorist attack
- Weapons: Pistol, Grenade, suicide vest, IED
- Deaths: 8 total: 4 civilians; 4 attackers
- Injuries: 24
- Perpetrator: Islamic State
- No. of participants: 4 to 14
- Defenders: Indonesian National Police; Indonesian National Armed Forces

On 14 January 2016, multiple explosions and gunfire were reported near the Sarinah shopping mall in central Jakarta, Indonesia, at the intersection of Jalan Kyai Haji Wahid Hasyim and Jalan MH Thamrin. One blast went off in a Burger King restaurant outside the mall. The attack occurred near a United Nations (UN) information centre, as well as luxury hotels and foreign embassies. The United Nations Environment Programme (UNEP) confirmed that a Dutch UN official was seriously injured in the attacks. It was reported an armed stand-off took place on the fourth level of the Menara Cakrawala (Skyline Tower) on Jalan MH Thamrin. At least eight people—four attackers and four civilians (three Indonesians and an Algerian-Canadian)—were killed, and 23 others were injured due to the attack. The Islamic State (IS) claimed responsibility.

== Background ==
Though Indonesia is far from the conflicts of the Middle East, the country has experienced several attacks by Islamist militants in the past two decades that have killed hundreds.

This was the first major attack in Jakarta since the 2009 Jakarta bombings, which were carried out by Jemaah Islamiyah (JI) and killed 7 plus 2 suicide bombers. JI is an al-Qaeda-linked group seeking to unite Indonesia, Malaysia, and the southern Philippines under an Islamic state. Since the 2002 Bali bombings, in which over 200 were killed, Indonesia has stepped up attempts to crack down on violent extremism. A law was enacted by the Indonesian legislature in 2003 in this regard.

According to a spokesman for the Indonesian National Police, the police had received information in November 2015 about a warning from IS that there would be an attack in Indonesia. In 2015, it was reported by the Jakarta-based Institute for Policy Analysis of Conflict that at least 50 Indonesians had joined the thousands of foreign fighters who have travelled to Syria to fight for extremist groups trying to create an Islamic state there.

== Attacks ==
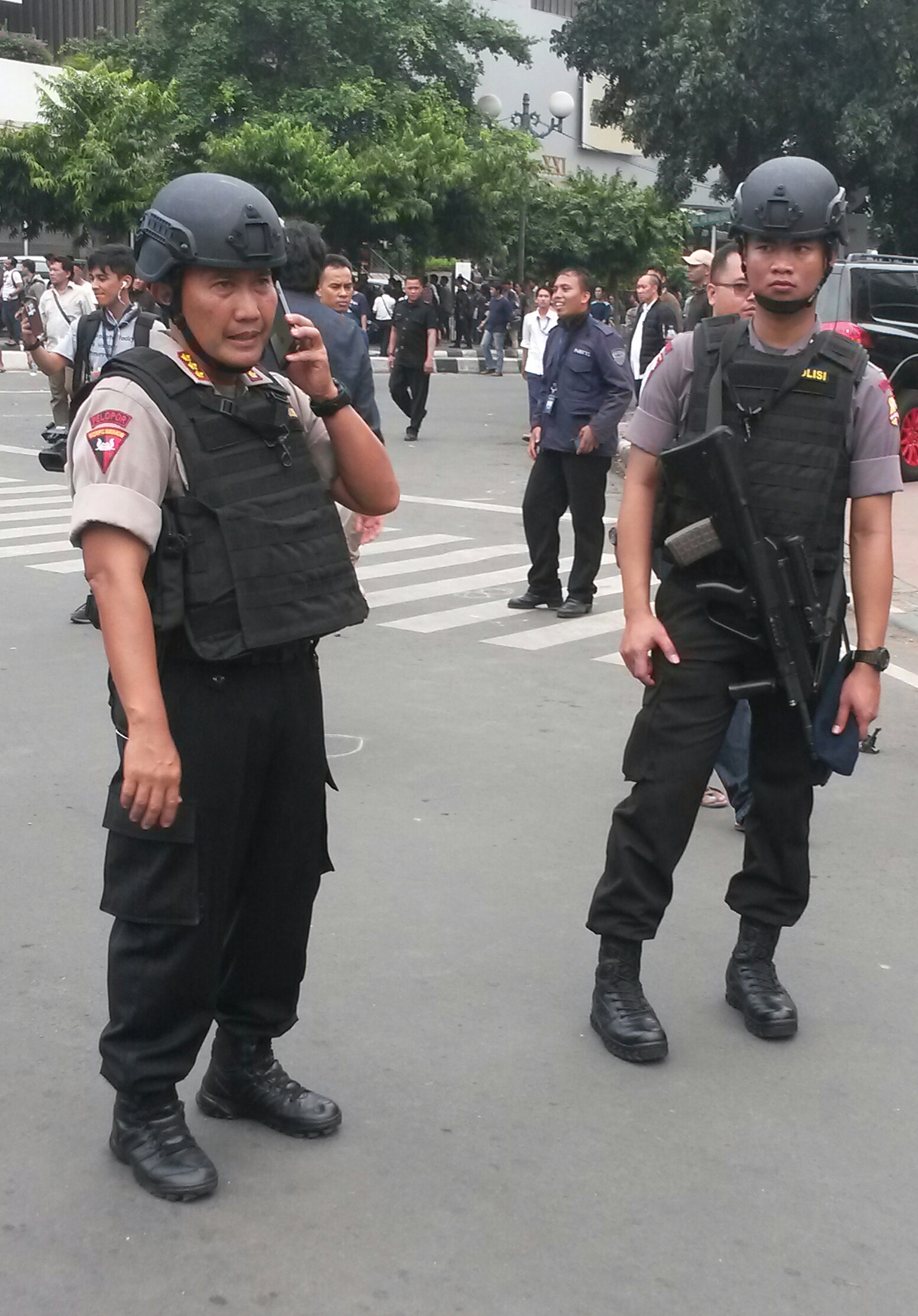
Armed Brimob police officers during the 2016 Jakarta attacks

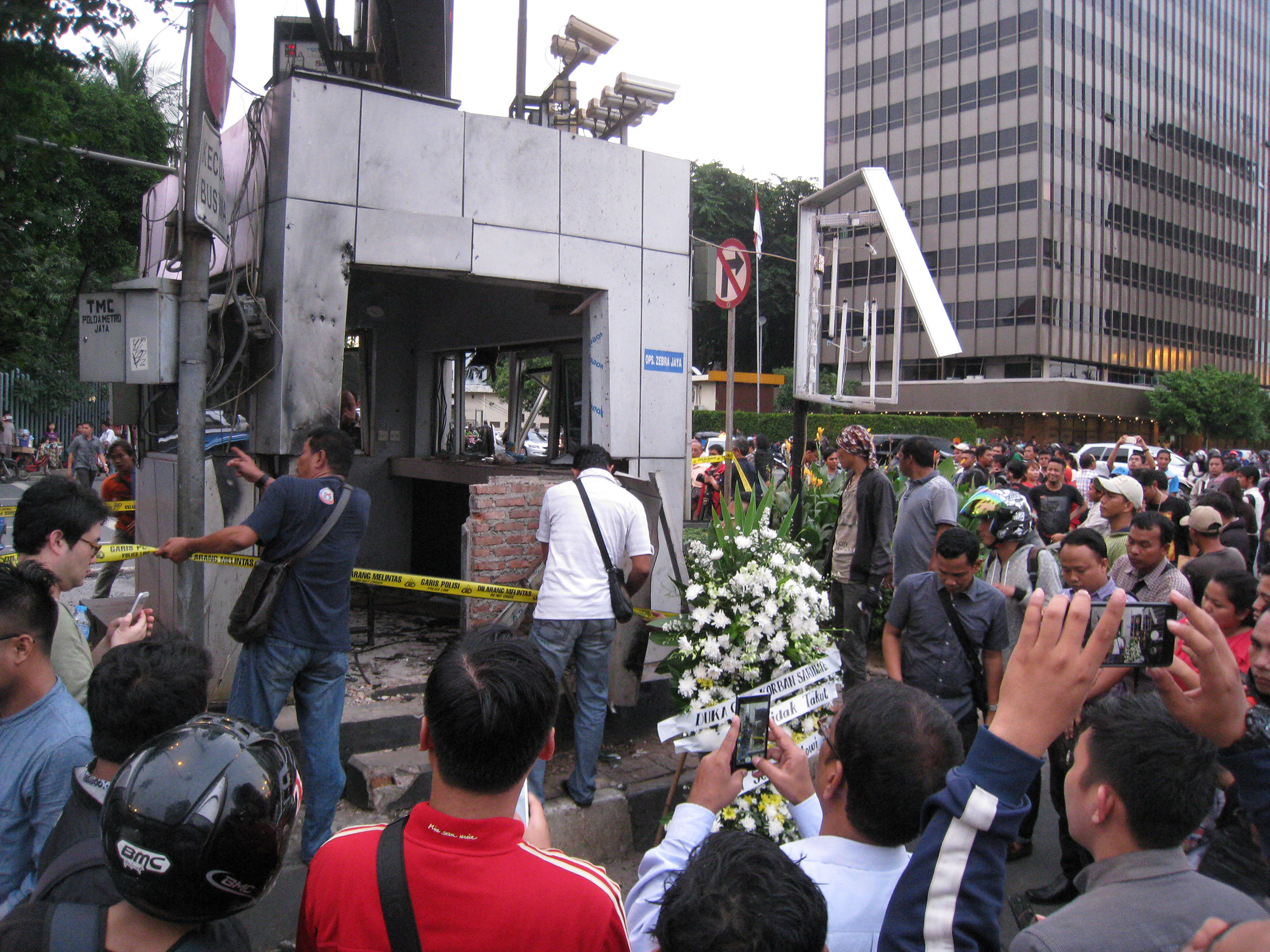
Police post damaged by suicide bomb attack in front of the Sarinah mall

On 14 January 2016 at 10:40 a.m. local time, several blasts followed by gunfire were reported to have occurred in Central Jakarta, which is home to many luxury hotels, offices and embassies. According to a spokesman for the Indonesian National Police, the attack involved an unknown number of assailants with grenades and guns. A total of six explosions were counted by news media.

The attack targeted a traffic police post at a major intersection, not far from the front doors of a Starbucks coffee shop and a Burger King franchise. The post was heavily damaged by explosions. Although three explosions in Cikini, Slipi, and Kuningan neighbourhoods, near Turkish and Pakistan embassies were reported, the Jakarta police later denied these explosions, as well as attacks in Simatupang and Palmerah, as a hoax. One explosion went off in front of a shopping centre called the Sarinah mall, near the UN office.

Footage later emerged purportedly showing two attackers huddling together outside the Burger King outlet when one of their suicide bombs was activated and they were blown up.

A series of pictures showed two gunmen opening fire against a crowd which gathered on Jalan M.H. Thamrin around a police post damaged by the bombings. The first gunman appears to shoot at two police officers, and the crowd disperses. The second gunman then shoots another policeman at close range. A police spokesman said the first gunman then took two hostages, a Dutchman and an Algerian, in the Skyline building car park, and both gunmen were later shot dead by police.

== Perpetrators ==
According to Jakarta police, an IS-linked Indonesian extremist, Bahrun Naim, was the mastermind behind the attack. Naim, thought to be a native of Pekalongan city in Central Java, relocated to Raqqa, Syria sometime before the attacks; he has been known to authorities since at least 2010. Naim appeared to maintain a blog in which he praises terrorist attacks, including the November 2015 Paris attacks, and calls on Indonesians to carry out such attacks in the archipelago. Naim was arrested in November 2010 at his home in Solo, Indonesia on suspicion of terrorism connections and was convicted in June 2011 on weapons charges, with the court finding insufficient evidence to convict him of terrorism.

An Indonesian national police official said three men had been detained in the investigation into a four-hour siege in the nation's capital Thursday that left seven people dead.

Police were able to name one of the attackers, the subject of a widely shared image that became the face of the attack, Afif Sunakim, who was seen carrying a gun and rucksack during the attacks. He was earlier sentenced to seven years for attending a militant camp.

Four attackers died during the attack. The two attackers who died in a suicide bombing were identified as Dian Juni Kurniadi and Ahmad Muhazab Saron, both aged 26. Two attackers who died in a shootout with police were named: firstly Afif, a.k.a. Sunakim a.k.a. Sunardi (age unknown), and secondly Marwan, a.k.a. Muhammad Ali (aged 40).

Individuals in Malaysia may have been connected.

== Casualties ==
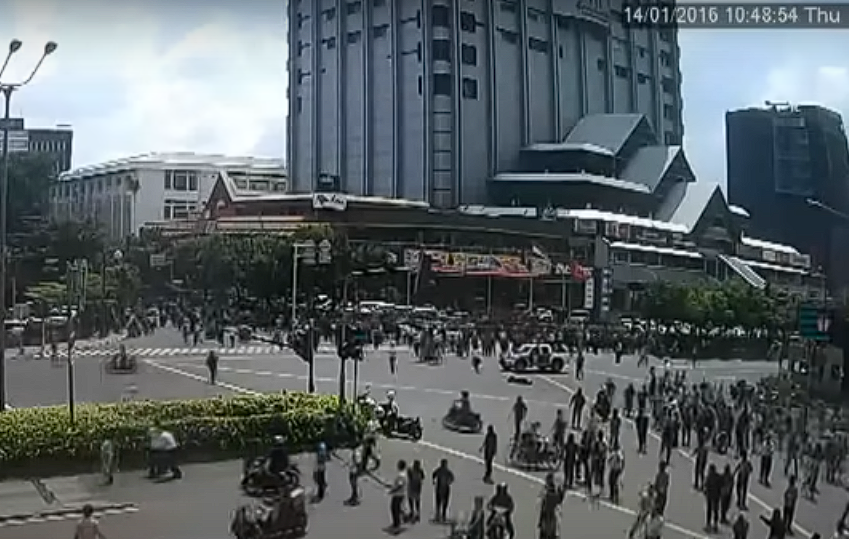
A crowd in Sarinah dispersing after attackers fired into them. One of the civilian victims can be seen lying on the ground next to the police car

A total of twenty people were injured, including five police officers and an Algerian, who escaped from Burger King. The Dutch embassy also confirmed that one of its nationals was seriously injured and being treated at a hospital. According to The New Paper, authorities had noted that some of the casualties were injured or killed while taking selfies.

Of the four civilian casualties, three died on the day of the attack: Taher Amer-Ouali, 70, an Algerian-Canadian hearing care specialist visiting family in Indonesia when he was shot; Rico Hermawan, 20 or 21, an Indonesian summoned for a traffic offence when a bomb exploded at the police post; Sugito, 43, an Indonesian courier who was originally labelled as being an attacker due to him sharing a name with a suspected terrorist. Rais Karna, 37, an Indonesian working at Jakarta branch of Bangkok Bank as an office boy, was the fourth civilian casualty, dying in hospital two days after the attack from head bullet wounds.

== Aftermath ==
Two days after the attack, Indonesian security forces arrested twelve people linked with the men. The twelve arrested were accused of plotting further attacks against Indonesian government, police and foreign targets in connection with the attackers who were shot dead in the attack.

A counterterrorism movie based on the attacks, titled 22 Minutes, is released to tell the 22 minutes of the attack.

== Reactions ==
=== Domestic ===
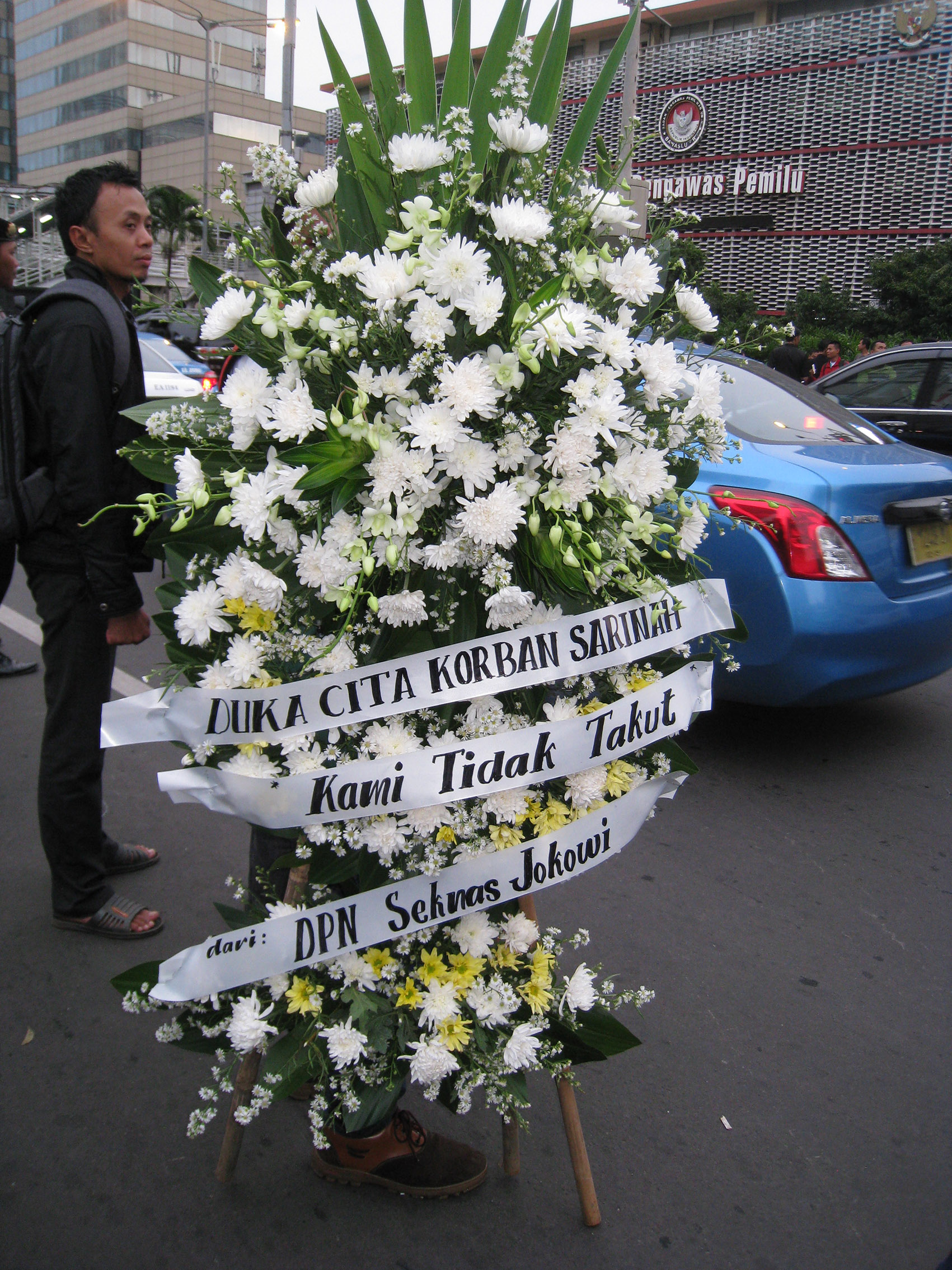
Condolence flowers in front of Sarinah mall by Seknas Jokowi, a Joko Widodo supporters organization. The text says: "Condolences for Sarinah victims, We are Not Afraid, from DPN (National Board) [of] Seknas Jokowi"

President Joko Widodo called the attacks "acts of terror" in a televised statement. In his statement, he said "Our nation and our people should not be afraid. We will not be defeated by these acts of terror. I hope the public stays calm. We all are grieving for the fallen victims of this incident, but we also condemn the act that has disturbed the security and peace and spread terror among our people."

Residents of Jakarta, and across Indonesia took his statement "We are not afraid" to social media with the hashtag #KamiTidakTakut, which was widely used on Twitter in posts offering condolences to the victims or for expressing defiance.

Starbucks issued a press statement condemning the attack. They also stated that they would close all their Jakarta branches "until further notice." However, Starbucks later re-opened all locations in Indonesia except for the store where the attacks took place.

=== International ===
Supranational

- Association of Southeast Asian Nations: The ASEAN member states condemned the attacks and extend its deepest sympathies to Indonesian government and families of the victims, as well supporting Indonesian authorities action to bring the perpetrators to justice.
- European Union: High Representative for Foreign Affairs Federica Mogherini sympathized with the relatives and friends of the victims noting that terrorism is the global problem which is to be tackled globally. Federica Mogherini also promised Indonesian government to cooperate closely with Indonesia in defending peace and the values of freedom and diversity.
- United Nations: Secretary-General of the United Nations Ban Ki-moon condemned the attacks, and reaffirmed that "there is absolutely no justification" for such acts of terrorism.

States

- Australia: Foreign Minister Julie Bishop released a statement stating that she had been in touch with Indonesian Foreign Minister Retno Marsudi, offering any support Indonesia needed to respond to the attacks. She also stated that the Australian Government condemned the attacks. The Department of Foreign Affairs and Trade advised Australians in Jakarta to limit movement and follow the instructions of authorities.
- Belarus: Belarus' Ministry of Foreign Affairs condemned the attacks.
- Brunei: Sultan Hassanal Bolkiah sent condolences to Indonesia and condemned the attacks.
- Canada: Foreign Affairs Minister Stéphane Dion vowed to double down on efforts to fight extremism after the attack occurred, stating "Canada will continue to stand by Indonesia and co-operate in the fight against extremism. We offer our full support to the Indonesian authorities during this challenging time." Prime Minister Justin Trudeau also offered similar support to Indonesia.
- China: Spokesperson Hong Lei of the Chinese Foreign Ministry said the Chinese Government strongly condemns the perpetrators of the attacks.
- East Timor: The Government of East Timor condemned the attacks and support Indonesian efforts in combating terrorism.
- Egypt: Egypt condemned the attacks.
- India: Prime Minister Narendra Modi condemned the "reprehensible" attacks and said his thoughts are with those who lost their loved ones. He prayed for the speedy recovery of the injured.
- Japan: Prime Minister Shinzo Abe said he was "shocked and infuriated by the attacks and that Japan will stand by Indonesia in strongly condemning them and never tolerating such acts."
- Malaysia: Prime Minister Najib Razak wrote on Twitter that he was "deeply shocked and saddened" and offered help to Indonesia in any possibility means, while the Malaysian government condemned the attacks.
- Netherlands: Minister of Foreign Affairs Bert Koenders condemned the attacks and offered assistance.
- New Zealand: New Zealand Government strongly condemned the attacks, while Nikki Kaye, New Zealand's Duty Minister said the explosions in Jakarta and the death of innocent people were "deeply disturbing".
- Pakistan: Prime Minister Nawaz Sharif strongly condemned the attacks. He said "the People and Government of Pakistan share the pain of Indonesian brethren at this critical moment" and that "terrorism was a common threat to Muslim countries and to fight it, was their collective responsibility."
- Philippines: The Department of Foreign Affairs strongly condemned the attacks and expressed its solidarity with the Indonesian people. In relation, The Philippine National Police and the Armed Forces of the Philippines investigate reports that some of the guns used by the perpetrators behind Jakarta attacks were made from the Philippines.
- Saudi Arabia: Saudi Foreign Minister Adel Al-Jubeir condemned the attack, stating that the attack should "strengthen our resolve to work effectively together to combat the scourge of terrorism."
- Singapore: Prime Minister Lee Hsien Loong wrote on a Facebook post that he was "shocked and dismayed by news of the bomb attacks in Jakarta." A spokesman for the Foreign Ministry condemned the attacks and said the country supported Indonesia in bringing those responsible to justice.
- Sri Lanka: Sri Lanka's Ministry of Foreign Affairs strongly condemned the terrorists attacks.
- Thailand: Prime Minister Prayut Chan-o-cha was saddened to hear the recent attacks and offered condolences and his country support to Indonesia.
- United Kingdom: Foreign Secretary Philip Hammond condemned the attacks as a "senseless acts of terror" and called on all British nationals in Jakarta and elsewhere in Indonesia "to maintain vigilance and monitor travel advice, local media and to follow the advice of local security authorities". The Foreign and Commonwealth Office advised Britons to follow the instructions of the authorities and limit movements around the affected areas.
- United States: The U.S. embassy encouraged its citizens to stay away from areas around the Sari Pan Pacific Hotel and Sarinah Plaza.
- Vietnam: Spokesperson of the Vietnamese Ministry of Foreign Affairs Le Hai Binh condemned the attacks with its embassy have working with Indonesian officials to monitor the situation.

== See also ==
- List of terrorist incidents in Indonesia
- List of terrorist incidents linked to the Islamic State
- List of terrorist incidents, January–June 2016
