= Jakarta Stock Exchange bombing =

2000 terrorist attack in Indonesia

- Location: 6.2231°S 106.8086°E; Jakarta, Indonesia
- Date: 13 September 2000 (UTC+7)
- Target: Stock Exchange
- Attack type: Car bomb; terrorist attack
- Deaths: 15

The Jakarta Stock Exchange bombing was a terrorist attack on the Jakarta Stock Exchange on 13 September 2000.

A car bomb exploded in the basement of the building, triggering a chain of explosions in which a number of cars caught fire. Most of the dead were drivers waiting by their employer's cars. Many had taken cover in their vehicles but suffocated as billowing black smoke engulfed the basement levels. The bombing suspended trading for two days after the attack and also resulted in a sudden, brief devaluation of the Indonesian rupiah.

The attack was later claimed by Jemaah Islamiyah, a Southeast Asian Islamic extremist group with links to al-Qaeda. The group was responsible for several other terrorist attacks in the region, including the Philippine consulate bombing in Jakarta which occurred just a month ago and the Bali bombings in 2002.

== Investigation ==
In August 2001 an Indonesian court sentenced two men to 20-year jail terms for masterminding the attack. The two men were members of the notorious Indonesian special forces unit, Kopassus. Prosecutors had demanded the death penalty for Teuku Ismuhadi Jafar and life imprisonment for his accomplice, Nuryadin, who escaped detention in July 2001 but was sentenced by the South Jakarta Court in absentia.

The court declined the death sentence for Jafar, saying that while he had ordered the blast he did not actively participate at the scene of the crime in downtown Jakarta.
