= Australian Embassy bombing in Jakarta =

2004 terrorist attack in Indonesia

Australian embassy bombing in Jakarta
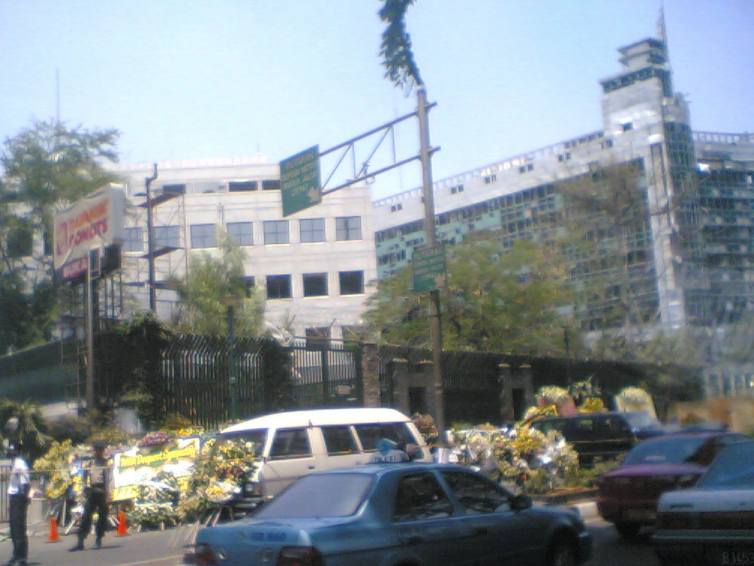
- Floral tributes in front of the Australian Embassy in Jakarta a few days after the bombing
- Location: Jakarta, Indonesia; 6°13′5.4″S 106°49′52″E
- Date: 9 September 2004; 22 years ago 10:30 am (UTC +7)
- Target: Australian embassy
- Attack type: Suicide bombing
- Weapon: Car bomb
- Deaths: 11 (including the perpetrator)
- Injuries: 150
- Perpetrator: Jemaah Islamiyah

A one-tonne car bomb, which was packed into a small Daihatsu delivery van, exploded outside the Australian embassy at Kuningan District, South Jakarta, at about 10:30 local time (03:30 UTC) on 9 September 2004, killing nine people, including the suicide bomber, and wounding over 150 others. The explosion gutted the Greek embassy on the 12th floor of an adjacent building, where three diplomats were slightly wounded. Damage to the nearby Chinese embassy was also reported. Numerous office buildings surrounding the embassy were also damaged by the blast, which shattered windows in buildings 500 metres (500 yd) away, injuring many workers inside, mostly by broken glass.

A dispute ensued as to how many civilians were killed by the explosion: local health authorities in Jakarta reported 9 deaths, compared to 11 deaths reported by Australian officials. Nonetheless, all Australians working at the embassy were reported alive. Among the victims killed were embassy security guard Anton Sujarwo, 23, and four Indonesian policemen on duty at the embassy. The rest were civilians, including the embassy gardener, Suryadi, 34, two embassy workers, a visa applicant, and a pedestrian.

== Reactions ==
Australian Prime Minister John Howard expressed his "utter dismay at this event" and Foreign Minister Alexander Downer said, "this was aimed at the Australian Embassy, there's no question of that" and that the investigators' "suspicions turn to Jemaah Islamiah". It is unclear whether the incident was intended to influence either of the two upcoming regional elections: the final stage of the Indonesian presidential elections scheduled for 20 September, or the Australian elections scheduled for 9 October.

The Australian Opposition Leader Mark Latham said "The terrorists responsible for this attack are evil and barbaric and must be dealt with as harshly as possible and as quickly as possible" and committed the Labor Party's "full support to all efforts by the Australian and Indonesian governments to ensure that happens".

A grainy photograph of a white delivery van suspected of carrying the bomb and the attackers was released by Indonesian police. Downer said that a mobile phone text message was sent to Indonesian authorities about 45 minutes before the bomb detonated, warning of attacks unless the leader of Jemaah Islamiyah Abu Bakar Bashir was released, and said that the warning was not delivered to the Australian Federal Police until several hours after the bombing. Indonesian police said that they did not receive such a message.

This was the third recent major attack involving Australians or Australian targets in Indonesia, after the 2002 Bali bombings, and the 2003 Marriott Hotel bombing. The executors of that attack, Jemaah Islamiyah, were also head suspects for this bombing.

== Investigation ==
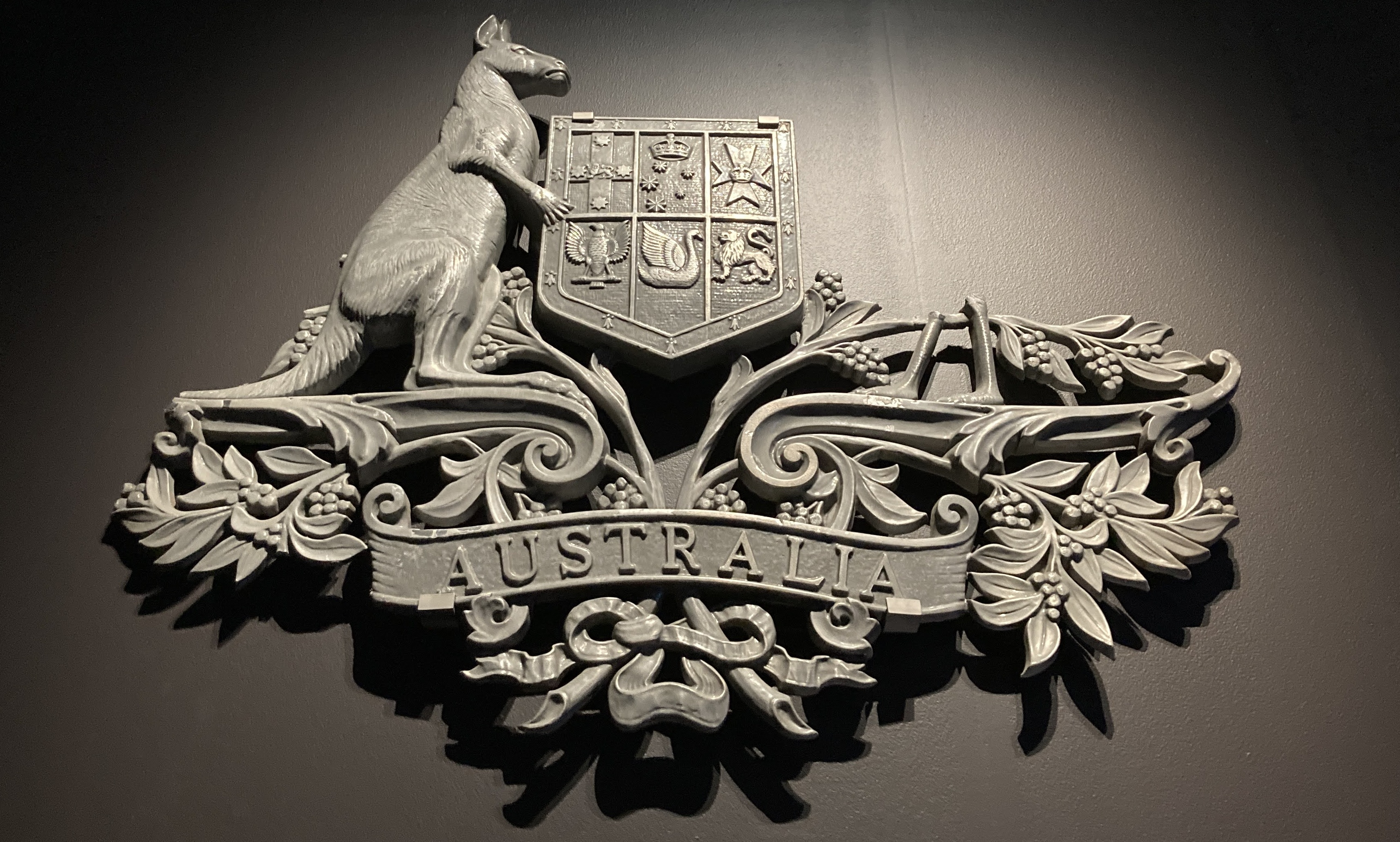
This coat of arms of Australia was mounted on the embassy building and was damaged by the bombing

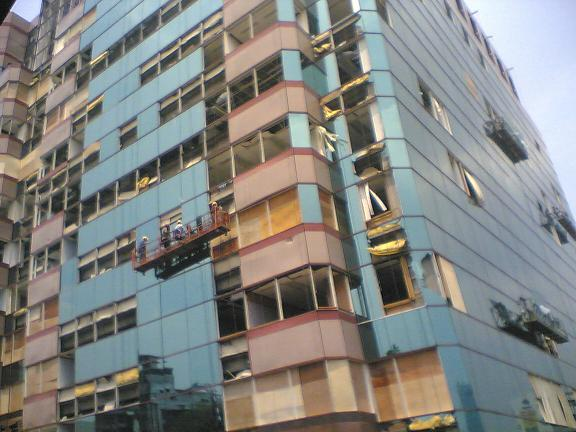
Damage caused to Plaza 89 building near the Australian embassy

Responsibility for the attack was claimed by Jemaah Islamiyah, an organisation which has also claimed responsibility for multiple attacks including the 2002 Bali bombings and alleged to have links with al-Qaeda. An Islamist web site, www.islamic-minbar.com, posted a statement by Jemaah Islamiyah saying:

We decided to settle accounts with Australia, one of the worst enemies of God and Islam, ... and a Mujahadeen brother succeeded in carrying out a martyr operation with a car bomb against the Australian embassy...

It is the first of a series of attacks. ... We advise Australians in Indonesia to leave this country or else we will transform it into a cemetery for them.

We advise the Australian government to withdraw its troops from Iraq. If our demand is not satisfied, we will deal them many painful blows. The lines of booby-trapped cars will have no end.

Our jihad (holy war) will continue until the liberation of the land of Muslims.

Jemaah Islamiah in eastern Asia – department of information – Indonesia.

— Possibly Jemaah Islamiyah, The Sydney Morning Herald

Police announced that Azahari Husin and Noordin Mohammed Top were suspected of being behind the bombing; Azahari was killed in a police raid in November 2005 at Batu, East Java, while Noordin was killed on 17 September 2009 at Surakarta, Central Java.

On 1 October 2004, authorities identified the suicide bomber as Heri Golun, based on DNA tests done at the scene.

On 10 November 2004, Indonesian police arrested Rois, also known as Iwan Dharmawan, along with five other suspects in Merak, Banten. During questioning, Rois claimed that he had received funds for the attack from a courier that was sent by Osama Bin Laden via Malaysia.

He told police: "According to Dr Azahari’s explanation to me at the time, the funds came from Osama bin Laden, and they were sent by a courier, but he didn’t say the name or when he received it".

He stated that the motivation for the bombing was Australia's involvement in the Iraq war: "The intention to bomb the Australian embassy was because the Australian government is the American lackey most active in supporting American policies to slaughter Muslims in Iraq."

On 13 September 2005, Rois was sentenced to death for his role in the bombing but appeared to recant his earlier confession by telling the court: "I reject the death sentence. I reject a day or even an hour of sentence because I'm innocent and I wasn't involved in this."

An appeal by Rois's lawyers against the death penalty was rejected by the Indonesian High Court in December 2005.

On 5 May 2006 the International Crisis Group released its report entitled Terrorism in Indonesia. It described the events leading up the attack;

On 5 August, at Noordin’s instructions, Rois set off to retrieve Heri Golun, who had been selected as the suicide bomber, and buy the Daihatsu vehicle that was used in the bombing. He enlisted the help of Irun Hidayat in both tasks. From then until 17 August, frantic activity moving the principals, purchasing additional materials for the bombs and raising funds – alternated with lulls, when the operatives went to Internet cafes to pass the time. On 17 August, Noordin asked Rois to check on Heri Golun’s state of mind. When Heri said he was ready, he moved into the house where Noordin and Azhari were and slept in their room at night, so they could give him additional religious counselling. On 23 August, Rois started to teach Heri Golun how to drive, and on 9 September, the new driver blew himself in front of the Australian embassy.

In March 2005, Irun Hidayat was charged with being an accessory by giving money to one of the bombing's perpetrators and providing housing after the attack for Azahari and Noordin. On 21 July, he was convicted of being an accessory by providing a house to Azahari and Noordin, but not to having planned the September attack, and was sentenced to three years in jail. Hidayat was the first man to stand trial related to the embassy bombing. According to the ICG report:

Irun Hidayat was also a central figure. Inducted into Darul Islam by Kang Jaja in 1987 at fifteen, he was in the same class at Serang Islamic High School as Imam Samudra and Heri Hafidin, one of the three owners of CV Sajira. He became a close friend of Rois, and the two went to Ambon in January 2002. Irun became a martial arts instructor in the military training sessions run by Kang Jaja and Rois. Since 1999, Irun also had been the local head of the religious council of the Indonesian Muslim Workers Union (Perserikatan Pekerja Muslim Indonesia, PPIM). He was to call on a fellow unionist to put up the bombers the night before they struck the embassy

Agus Ahmad was also captured and put on trial. He helped one of the core bombers, "Rios", scout for safe houses and transported around 70 kilograms of highly explosive TNT. Arrests in July 2004 near the city of Solo forced Azahari and Noordin to change their base of operations. Agus used a Daihatsu van to move the explosives to his own house in Cianjur, West Java.

== See also ==
- List of terrorist incidents in Indonesia
- 2002 Bali bombings
- 2003 Marriott Hotel bombing
- 2005 Bali bombings
- 2009 Jakarta bombings
- Philippine consulate bombing in Jakarta
