= 2004 Poso bus bombing =

Terrorist incident in Indonesia

- Location: Poso, Central Sulawesi, Indonesia
- Date: 13 November 2004; 9:15 a.m. or 9:20 a.m. (UTC+8)
- Target: Minibus parked at market in Poso township
- Attack type: Improvised explosive device
- Deaths: 6
- Injuries: 3
- Perpetrators: Unknown, purportedly Dr. Azahari and Noordin M. Top

The 2004 Poso bus bombing was a terrorist attack that occurred in Central Sulawesi, Indonesia, on 13 November 2004. It targeted a bus travelling to the majority Christian village of Silancak. The bomb, an improvised explosive device, exploded at 9:15 a.m. (UTC+7), while the minibus was stopped at a market in Poso. Six people were killed and three injured in the blast. Witnesses later reported that three people were involved in the attack. Two suspects were detained, but later released.

== The attack ==
According to the police report, witnesses saw three people working together to place an unidentified object in a minibus parked near the traditional market (also 50 metres from a police station) in Poso, and then leaving. A male planted the device, while two women served as lookouts. The object, apparently an improvised explosive device, detonated at approximately 9:15 a.m., killing three of the Protestant passengers instantly, with another three dying of their wounds in the hospital; they had been travelling from their predominantly Christian village of Sape to the nearby village of Tentenna. The timing of the attack coincided with a busy period in the market to celebrate the Eid ul-Fitr festival that was to happen the following week.

The motive for the attack is unknown. Chief Security Minister Adi Sucipto described it as an act of terrorism, preceded by numerous others in the year prior to the attack that caused 25 deaths. On 19 November 2004, two male suspects were arrested for the attacks after a search for two men seen leaving the scene by motorcycle. Both were released without charge.

== See also ==
- List of terrorist incidents, 2004
