= Bahrun Naim =

Indonesian Islamist, terrorist, and Islamic State (IS) leader

- Born: Muhammad Bahrun Naim Anggih Tamtomo; 6 September 1983; Pekalongan, Indonesia
- Died: 8 June 2018 (aged 34); Ash Shafa, Syria
- Parents: Sugiran (father); Surati (mother)
- Military career
- Allegiance: Islamic State of Iraq and the Levant (2014–2018)

Bahrun Naim (6 September 1983 – June 8, 2018), was an Indonesian Islamist, terrorist, and Islamic State (IS) leader. He was the alleged mastermind of the 2016 Jakarta attacks.

== Names ==
Muhammad Bahrun Naim Anggih Tamtomo, was known as Bahrun Naim, and also simply as Na'im, Abu Rayyan or Abu Aishah.

== Background ==
Naim was born in Pekalongan on September 6, 1983 and grew up in Pasar Kliwon. He was admitted in 2002 and graduated with an Associate degree in Information Technology. After that he worked at an Internet café as a computer technician.

== Terrorism ==
Naim has often been associated with Mujahidin Indonesia Timur (MIT) leader Abu Wardah, who has pledged allegiance to IS. He has been known to the authorities since at least 2010 during terrorism investigations in Bekasi. At that time the Anti-terror Detachment 88 arrested a Uyghur foreigner by the name of Alli. The squad searched Alli's residence in the Green Boulevard residential area at Taman Harapan Indah, Bekasi, at around 16:30 pm, December 23, 2010, but they did not find Alli's passport, instead they found a vest-mounted suicide bomb and 533 pieces of 7.62 cm rifle bullets and 31 pieces of 9 mm bullets . He is thought to be behind the funding of foreign nationals as well as pouring some funds to Indonesia to assemble bombs.

He was sentenced to two and half years in prison by the State Court of Surakarta with verdict of violating the Emergency Law No. 12 of 1951 on the possession of firearms and explosives. From around October to November 2015, a Facebook account, named "Muhammad Bahrunnaim Anggih Tamtomo" actively distributed tutorials on making bombs and homemade firearms. The page address was once linked to another radical's website, which listed more comprehensive bomb-making.

Bahrun Naim went to Syria to join the Islamic State of Iraq and the Levant (ISIS) in 2014 and was thought to be still in Syria. Initially, he joined an ISIS support group in Solo. In Syria, Bahrun created a blog, bahrunnaim.co, and started to write and interact with his supporters through online media. In one of his posts, Bahrun told of his struggle to Syria. He took his wife and two children. At that time, his young wife became pregnant.

== Death ==
Bahrun Naim was killed in a U.S. airstrike on June 8, 2018 as he was riding a motorcycle in Ash Shafa, Syria, about two years after counter-terror forces began tracking him. According to Indonesian authorities, Naim's death was a major blow to the Islamic State in Southeast Asia, which prospered in recruiting jihadists both in Malaysia and from the region.
