= Pamulang =

- Town and District
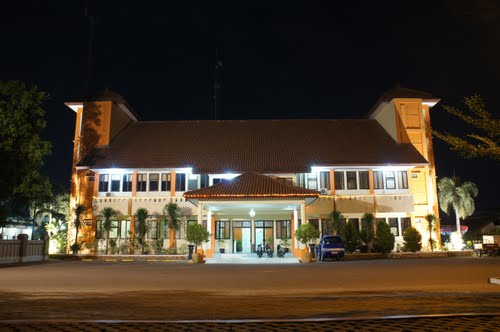
- Pamulang district office in 2013

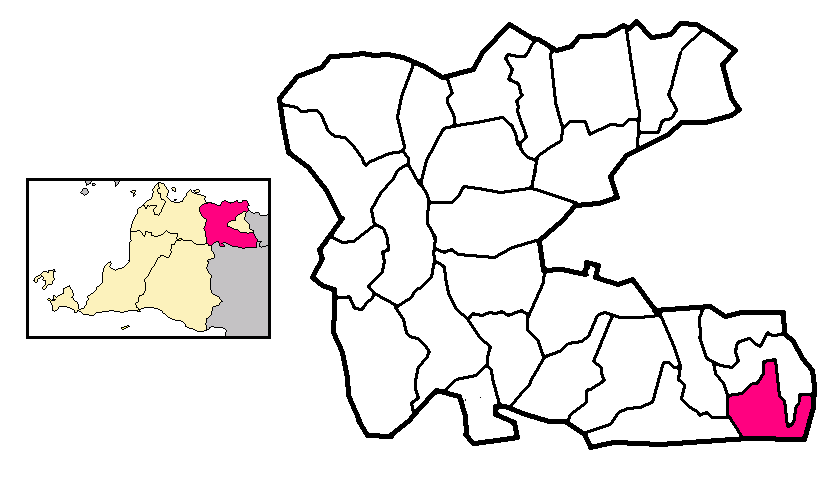
- Map location of Pamulang
- Country: Indonesia
- Province: Banten
- City: South Tangerang
- Established: 11 January 1992

Government
  - Camat: Egi Jati Permana, S.E., M.Si.

Area
  - Total: 28.74 km^{2} (11.10 sq mi)

Population (mid 2023 estimate)
  - Total: 324,059
  - Density: 11,280/km^{2} (29,200/sq mi)

Pamulang is a town and an administrative district (kecamatan) within the city of South Tangerang, in Banten Province on Java, Indonesia. The district covers an area of 28.74 km^{2} and had a population of 286,270 at the 2010 Census and 305,563 at the 2020 Census; the official estimate as of mid-2023 was 324,059.

== History ==
Pamulang was previously part of Ciputat district before it was split off from the southern part of the district in 1992.

== Communities ==
Pamulang District is sub-divided into eight urban communities (kelurahan), listed below with their areas and their officially-estimated populations as of mid-2022, together with their postcodes.

Kode Wilayah	Name of kelurahan	Area in km^{2}	Population mid 2022 estimate	Post code
36.74.06.1001	Pamulang Barat	4.16	52,930	15417
36.74.06.1002	Benda Baru	2.66	43,400	15418
36.74.06.1003	Pondok Benda	3.86	53,074	15416
36.74.06.1004	Pondok Cabe Udik	4.83	21,353	15418
36.74.06.1005	Pondok Cabe Ilir	3.96	35,981	15418
36.74.06.1006	Kedaung	2.56	50,998	15415
36.74.06.1007	Bambu Apus	2.20	28,757	15415
36.74.06.1008	Pamulang Timur	2.59	31,274	15417
36.74.06	Totals	26.82	317,767 ^{(a)}	

Notes: (a) comprising 158,749 males and 159,018 females.

== Transportation ==
=== Citybus ===
- Transjakarta D31 Southcity Cinere - LRT Station Setiabudi
- Transjakarta D32 Southcity Cinere - Bundaran Senayan
- Trans Anggrek : TA2 Stasiun Rawa Buntu - Terminal Pondok Cabe

=== MRT Jakarta Planned ===
- MRT Jakarta (Future Planned) Lebak Bulus - Pamulang

=== LRT Depok - Tangerang Planned (Future Development) ===
- LRT Depok Baru - Soekarno Hatta International Airport

== Access Toll Road ==
- Jakarta Outer Ring Road 2 Exit Tol Pamulang
