= Philippine consulate bombing in Jakarta =

2000 terror attack in Jakarta, Indonesia

Philippine embassy bombing in Jakarta
- Location: 06°11′59″S 106°49′50″E; Jakarta, Indonesia
- Date: 1 August 2000; 26 years ago 12:30 p.m. (UTC+7)
- Target: Official residence of the Philippine Ambassador to Indonesia
- Attack type: Car bomb, terrorist attack
- Deaths: 2
- Injuries: 21
- Perpetrators: Unknown, purportedly Jemaah Islamiyah agents, including Azahari Husin and Noordin Mohammad Top among them

The Philippine embassy in Menteng, Jakarta, Indonesia, was bombed on 1 August 2000. A bomb was detonated outside the official residence of the Philippine ambassador to Indonesia, Leonides Caday, killing two people and injuring 21 others. Those killed were a street vendor and a guard to the official residence. Caday was treated in hospital for head and hand injuries.

== Explosion ==
Some witnesses suggested the 12:30 p.m. blast came from the envoy's vehicle and detonated as it entered the residence on Imam Bonjol Street. However, police investigators theorized that another car parked near the entrance contained the bomb, which was detonated as the ambassador's Mercedes entered his driveway.

The lunchtime blast caused numerous shrapnel wounds and at least four bystanders were taken to Jakarta hospitals with critical injuries. The car carrying the Philippine ambassador to Indonesia was destroyed and there was damage to dozens of other vehicles on the street that houses several government offices and the homes of other foreign diplomats and senior government officials. A wing of the official residence and the office of Indonesia's national electoral commission were both moderately damaged.

== Reaction ==
In response Alexander Aguirre, national security adviser to then President Joseph Estrada, stated the bombing was the first time a Philippine diplomatic post had been bombed and that the Philippine government "didn't expect that to happen." Security at the Philippine Embassy in Jakarta, also located on Imam Bonjol Street, was tightened as a result.

Then Indonesian President Abdurrahman Wahid stated he believed the bombing was linked to the Philippine government's efforts to combat Islamist rebel groups in Mindanao, however the Moro Islamic Liberation Front released a statement denying it had set the bomb. Abu Sayyaf, another group opposed to the Philippine government, did not claim responsibility either.

Almost three years later Indonesian police identified ten suspects, most known members of regional terrorist group Jemaah Islamiyah, as suspects in the investigation. The now apprehended Riduan Isamuddin, chief organiser of the 2002 Bali nightclub bombings among others, is suspected of planning and financing the attack.
