= Azahari Husin =

Malaysian terrorist (1957–2005)

- Azahari Husin's FBI Photo
- Born: 14 September 1957; Malacca, Federation of Malaya
- Died: 9 November 2005 (aged 48); Batu, East Java, Indonesia
- Occupation: Bombmaker of the splinter group of Jemaah Islamiyah
- Spouse: Wan Noraini Jusoh
- Children: Aisyah Hijanah Azahari
- Status: Deceased (2005)
- Penalty: None

The death of top JI bombmaker Azahari bin Husin in November 2005 may have disrupted JI operations.

Azahari bin Husin (14 September 1957 – 9 November 2005), also known as Azahari Husin or Azhari Husin, was a Malaysian engineer and former university lecturer who was believed to be the technical mastermind behind the series of terrorist attacks in Indonesia in the early 2000s (including the 2002 Bali bombings). Nicknamed the "Demolition Man" by Malaysian newspapers, he was one of the most wanted men in Indonesia along with Noordin Mohammad Top.

== Early life and biography ==
Azahari was born in Malacca, then-part of the Federation of Malaya (present-day Malaysia) in 1957. At the age of 17, Azahari later studied in Adelaide University, Australia for four years since 1975 in mechanical engineering before dropping out in 1979. According to one his Australian classmates, he was described as "bright and cavalier. He seemed to have a healthy disrespect for authority." Later on, he was an engineer with a PhD from the University of Reading, United Kingdom and was a lecturer at the University of Technology Malaysia in Skudai, Johor, Malaysia. It was there that he met lecturer and future wife, Wan Noraini Jusoh of Acehnese descent. The couple eventually had two children together.

In the late 1990s, he received extensive bomb training in Afghanistan and the southern Philippines. He authored the Jemaah Islamiyah bomb manual, used in the Philippine consulate bombing in Jakarta, Jakarta Stock Exchange bombing, the Christmas Eve bombings, the 2002 Bali bombings, and the 2003 Marriott Hotel bombing. He also planned the 2004 Australian embassy bombing in Jakarta and was implicated in the 2002 Makassar bombing, the 2004 Poso bus bombing, the 2005 Tentena market bombings and the 2005 Bali bombings.

Before the Marriott Hotel bombing, Azahari stayed with Asmar Latin Sani, the suspected Marriott suicide bomber, at his home in Bengkulu on the island of Sumatra.

In July 2004, Azahari and Noordin narrowly escaped a police raid on a rented house west of Jakarta, where forensic experts later found traces of explosives used in the embassy bombing. Neighbours described both as reclusive men who left the property only to pray at a nearby mosque; and they said that before the bombing, they saw the duo loading heavy boxes into a white delivery van which is the same type used in that attack.

Both men were close associates of Jemaah Islamiyah's former operational chief, Riduan Isamuddin (better known as Hambali), who was captured in Thailand in 2003. However, despite their connections to Jemaah Islamiyah, in January 2006 Indonesian police reported that Noordin and Azehari had split away from the organisation to form "an even more hardline group". The latter had been set up around 2005 and reportedly bore the name "Al-Qaeda Jihad Organisation for the Malay Archipelago".

== Death ==
On 9 November 2005, Indonesian police, acting on a tip-off, located Azahari. They conducted a raid on one of his hideouts in Batu, East Java with Detachment 88 operators sent to assist regular police officers. Three suspected jihadist terrorists barricaded themselves inside a house and they put up stiff resistance, throwing grenades and firing bullets at the police outside. This was followed by a series of explosions, one of which was a suicide blast by his assistant setting off his bomb vest.

Azahari was shot and killed by a police sniper, after which one of his disciples blew himself up to prevent from being taken alive. Police identified the intact corpse of Azahari, with a bullet wound in his chest. According to Sutanto, the Head of Indonesian State Intelligence Agency, he stated, "the condition of Azahari’s corpse is that it was severed around the legs and torso. He was not able to reach the button (of a bomb) because officers shot him first, but the other one was able to commit a suicide bombing."

=== Reactions ===
One of his relatives, Wan Kamaruddin, told to the Agence France-Presse that Azahari's widow, Wan Noraini Jusoh, stated that his death as "as an expression of Allah's will". Kamaruddin also stated that Azahari's widow, who is recovering from throat cancer, was "tired and disturbed" with a media outside her home since Azahari's death.
