= Operation Alpha 29 =

Indonesian military operation

- Part of Operation Madago Raya
Date	18 July 2016
Location	Tambarana, Poso Regency, Central Sulawesi, Indonesia
Result	Indonesian victory; Abu Wardah alias Santoso was killed

Belligerents
Indonesia	East Indonesia Mujahideen (MIT)

Commanders and leaders
(Indonesia) Gatot Nurmantyo	Santoso †

Units involved
Indonesian Army; Kostrad; Team Alfa 29 of the 515th Raider Infantry Battalion	Santoso-Basri faction

Strength
9 soldiers	5 insurgents

Casualties and losses
No casualties	2 killed

Operation Alpha 29 (Indonesian: Operasi Alfa 29) was a military operation launched by Team Alfa 29 from the 515th Raider Infantry Battalion Kostrad of the Indonesian Army on 18 July 2016 in Tambarana, Poso Regency, Central Sulawesi. This operation was carried out to capture, paralyze, or kill Santoso (known as Abu Wardah), the leader of the East Indonesia Mujahideen.

== Background ==
=== Preparation ===
Commander of the Indonesian National Armed Forces General Gatot Nurmantyo revealed that soldiers from the 515th Raider Infantry Battalion had departed 13 days prior to the operation to hunt down Santoso's group. It took them three days to cover about 11 kilometers to Santoso's hideout, while it took them eight days to get to the ambush point.

Team Alfa 29 was a closing team stationed along routes that were suspected to be the place where members of the Santoso group could escape from the Tinombala Task Force. This team backed up the previous team and focused on being tasked with hunting down Santoso in three areas.

The two teams that previously carried out hunting operations forced Santoso and his group to split up and kept trying to find a new, safer place. While trying to find a safe place from the police, Santoso and his group were finally detected by the closing team or Team Alfa 29.

=== Ambush ===
On 18 July 2016, while carrying out a patrol in the mountains of Tambarana Village, they found a hut and saw several unknown people picking up vegetables and sweet potatoes to cover their tracks. The attack on the Santoso group was carried out at around 16:00 WITA by members of the task force codenamed Alfa 29 which consisted of nine soldiers from 515th Raider Infantry Battalion.

They also found traces in the river and saw three people next to the river but immediately disappeared. The task force team then tried to approach the unknown people in silence. After being within about 30 meters, they then engaged in gunfire for about 30 minutes. Gunfire took place in the mountains around Tambarana Village, Poso Pesisir Utara District, around 17.00 WITA.

== Death of Santoso ==
After conducting a search after the firefight, two bodies and an M16 rifle were found. While the other three people managed to escape.

Basri, who was initially thought to have died (later turned out to be Mukhtar), managed to escape. Head of the Operation Tinombala Task Force Police Grand Commissioner Leo Bona Lubis revealed that Santoso was certain to die from the results of external physical identification and from the testimonies of witnesses.

"From the results of external identification checks, I as the head of the operation stated that the results of yesterday's firefight around 17.00 to 18.30 one of them (the dead) was someone from the wanted list, namely the terrorist kingpins Santoso and Mukhtar who were on the wanted list."

Police Grand Commissioner Leo Bona Lubis, Deputy Chief of Central Sulawesi Police, 19 July 2016

The two bodies, namely Santoso and Mukhtar, were then evacuated on the morning of 19 July 2016 to the Tambarana Police Station, Poso Pesisir Utara District. Only a few minutes at the Tambarana Police Station, then the bodies of the two fugitives in the terrorism case were flown by a helicopter to Mutiara SIS Al-Jufrie Airport in Palu. Due to the success of the operation, all officers involved in the Tinombala Task Force will receive an extraordinary promotion.

== Reaction ==
Terrorism observer from the Community Of Ideological Islamic Analyst (CIIA) Harits Abu Ulya, delivered five analyzes. First, the existence of the terrorist group resistance will drastically decline because Santoso has been a symbol as well as a knot of resistance in the jungle of Poso so far. Second, in Indonesia there are three sections for guerrillas, namely Sulawesi, Aceh and Papua. When the figure of Santoso no longer exists, the terrorist resistance in Sulawesi will fade away, and the opportunity for peace in Poso will open up. Third, there will be no new 'Santosos' that will emerge because of personal choices with a background of revenge or creations from certain groups because of their future political vision. Fourth, Operation Tinombala must be stopped immediately because its main target in Poso has been obtained. Finally, the death of Santoso is a lesson for the Indonesian government to use the disengagement of violence approach instead and leave the enforcement methods.
