= Ali Kalora =

Indonesian Islamic militant (1981–2021)

- Born: Ali Ahmad; 30 May 1981; Kalora village, Poso Regency, Indonesia
- Died: 18 September 2021 (aged 40); Astina, Parigi Moutong Regency, Central Sulawesi, Indonesia
- Cause of death: Gunshot wounds
- Years active: 2012–2021
- Organization: East Indonesia Mujahideen
- Predecessor: Abu Wardah
- Spouse: Tini Susantika

Ali Ahmad, known popularly as Ali Kalora (30 May 1981 – 18 September 2021), was an Indonesian Islamic militant and leader of East Indonesia Mujahideen. He was referred to as Indonesia's most wanted militant leader and was the main target of both Indonesian military and police during Operation Tinombala. He became leader of the militant organization after Abu Wardah was shot and killed in July 2016. He waged an insurgency and committed several attacks against villages around Poso Regency and Parigi Moutong Regency until 18 September 2021, where he was shot and killed by the Madago Raya Operation task force.

== Early life ==
Ali Ahmad was born on 30 May 1981 in Kalora village, Poso Regency. As he grew up, he identified himself more with his village and gave himself the nickname Ali Kalora.

== Involvement in terrorism ==
Ali was a follower of Santoso, also known as Abu Wardah in East Indonesia Mujahideen. After the death of Daeng Koro, prominent leader of the organization under Santoso, he was chosen as a replacement and soon became close with Santoso. As a native from Poso, he became a guide for other militants due to his knowledge of the local area. Santoso was shot and killed on 18 July 2016, followed by the arrest of another prominent leader Muhammad Basri on 14 September. His wife, Tini Susanti was arrested by police in November 2016. He continued to wage an insurgency around the jungles in Poso and Parigi Moutong as the organization shrank in size.

According to experts from the Community of Ideological Islamic Analyst, his team had less than 10 people but was resilient and able to take refuge in the jungle for a long time. He was involved in various attacks on police stations and Christian communities in the region, particularly between 2019 and 2020. One of the most infamous attacks he carried out was on 19 November 2020, when his group massacred a family of four, and burned down a church and three houses. The attack caused villagers in the region to panic, and as many as 150 families took refuge.

He was reported to be willing to surrender in March 2021, but was said to be threatened by other factions in the group. In August, Basri, a former leader of the group, made a video asking Ali to surrender which became viral on the Indonesian internet.

== Death ==
On 18 September 2021, Kalora was killed alongside commander Jaka Ramadhan during a shoot-out with Indonesian soldiers and police, who were carrying out the joint Operation Madago Raya. The clash happened around the small village of Astina in Parigi Moutong Regency, in Central Sulawesi.

Several explosives inside a rag bag were found around his remains. The presence of explosives delayed the evacuation of Ali's corpse by police until the location was secured. The harsh terrain also made the entire process difficult. The evacuation was done by the Mobile Brigade Corps and his remains were thereafter brought to the city of Palu to be identified. After forensic identification in Palu Bhayangkara Hospital, the remains were confirmed to be those of Kalora.
