= Operation Madago Raya =

2016–2022 operation against Indonesian terrorists

- Part of Terrorism in Indonesia in War on terror
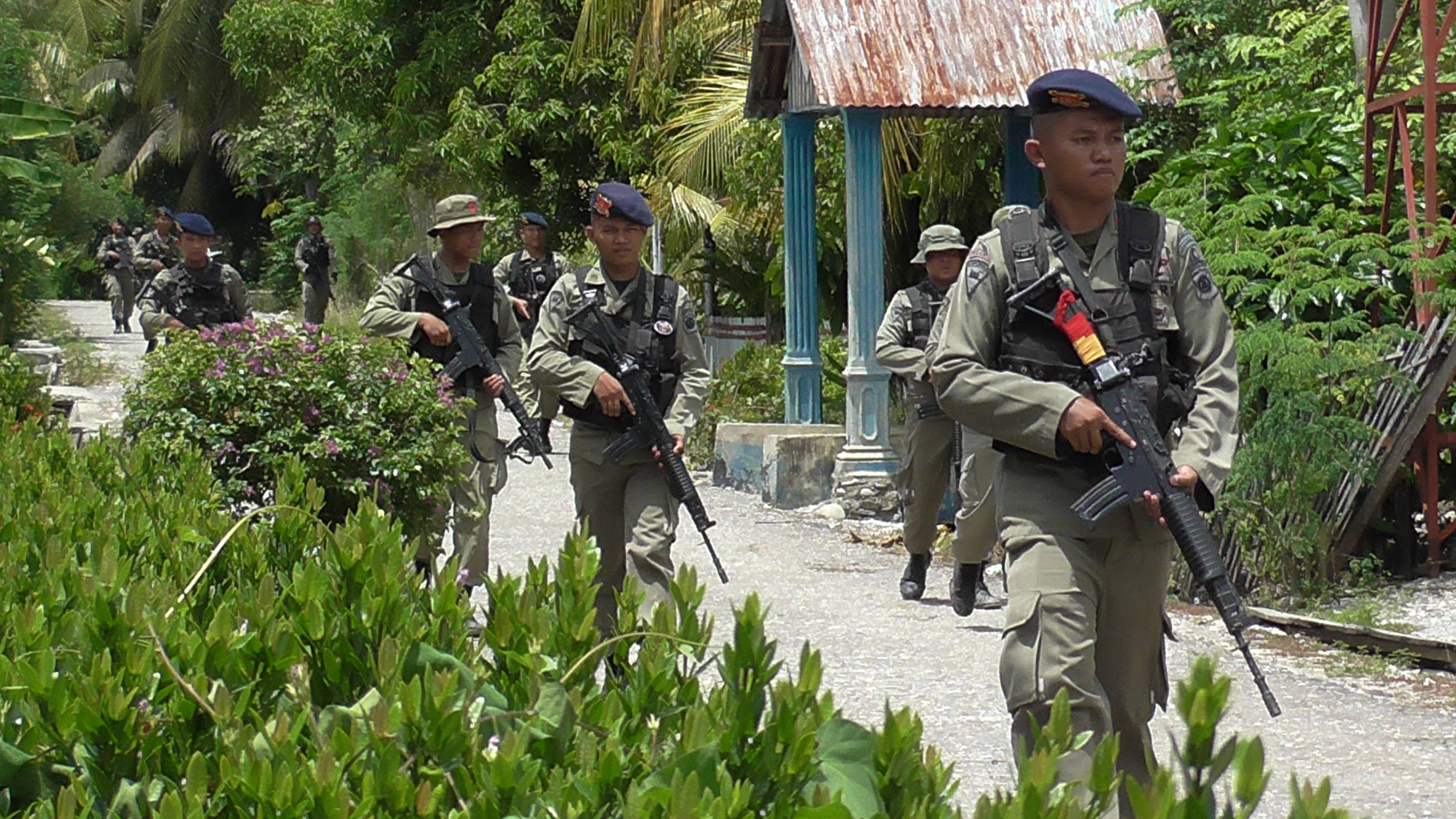
- Mobile Brigade Corps personnel at Poso Pesisir District, Poso Regency on 8 April 2016
Date	10 January 2016 – 29 September 2022 (10 years, 8 months, 2 weeks and 6 days) (Operation still continues)
Location	Central Sulawesi (mountainous area of Poso Regency, Parigi Moutong Regency, and Sigi Regency), Indonesia
Result	Indonesian victory; All members of East Indonesia Mujahideen were either killed or captured

Belligerents
Indonesia	East Indonesia Mujahideen; Turkistan Islamic Party (2014–2016)

Commanders and leaders
(Indonesia) Joko Widodo; (Indonesia) Luhut Binsar Panjaitan; (Indonesia) Wiranto; (Indonesia) Mahfud MD; (Indonesia) Ryamizard Ryacudu; (Indonesia) Prabowo Subianto; (Indonesia) Longki Djanggola; Gatot Nurmantyo; Hadi Tjahjanto; Andika Perkasa; Badrodin Haiti; Tito Karnavian; Idham Azis; Listyo Sigit Prabowo	Santoso †; Daeng Koro †; Basri (POW); Ali Kalora †

Units involved
Indonesian National Armed Forces; Koopssus; Indonesian Army; Kostrad; Kopassus; Tontaipur; Indonesian Navy; Indonesian Marine Corps; Indonesian Air Force; 5th Air Squadron; 51st Air Squadron; Kopasgat; Indonesian National Police; Mobile Brigade Corps; Detachment 88	East Indonesia Mujahideen; Santoso-Basri faction (until 14 September 2016); Ali Kalora faction (2010–21)

Strength
≈3,000 from: Koopsus; Mobile Brigade Corps; Detachment 88; Kostrad; Indonesian Marine Corps; Raider infantry from Indonesian Army infantry battalions; Kopassus; Tontaipur; Kopasgat	MIT: 18 (July 2016); 14 (August 2016); 11 (September 2016); 10 (October 2016); 9 (November 2016); 7 (May 2017); 10 (December 2018); 14 (January 2019); 9 (March 2019); 10 (November 2019); 15 (April 2020); 11 (November 2020); 9 (March 2021); 6 (July 2021); 3 (September 2021); 1 (May 2022); 0 (September 2022); Total: 41+ TIP: 12The rest were coming from the other parts of Indonesia

Casualties and losses
18 casualties (15 soldiers, 3 police officer)	51 killed (Note: 45 were MIT members, 6 were Turkistan Islamic Party members, and the rest coming from the other parts of Indonesia.); 21 surrender and captured (Note: 15 were MIT members, 6 were Turkistan Islamic Party members)
- 16 civilians killed

Operation Madago Raya (Indonesian: Operasi Madago Raya), previously known as Operation Tinombala, is a joint police–military operation conducted by the Indonesian National Police and the Indonesian Armed Forces to capture and/or eliminate members of Mujahidin Indonesia Timur (MIT), an Indonesian terrorist group which supports ISIL and was commanded by Santoso. In 2016, the Indonesian military and police succeeded in killing Santoso, but the then Chief of the National Police Tito Karnavian continued the operation to ensure the region's safety from the remaining members of the group. Central Sulawesi governor Longki Djanggola praised the operation for its relatively humane methods, since several leaders of the group were successfully captured alive. Only 19 militants were, however, captured alive, while more than 40 were killed.

The operation was extended until December 2022, and the operation is currently undergoing phasing out phase. Starting from January 2023, the operation's objective changed to restoring civil order and rehabilitating society from the damage caused by the group and its operation.

As in July 2025, the operation still conducted but to the preventive level.

== Background ==
The operation was commenced by the Indonesian government to eradicate the MIT and prevent them from spreading terror to Indonesian and foreign citizens in Central Sulawesi. The operation, a continuation of both Operation Camar Maleo I & II, began in early March 2016 and is still ongoing. In 2014, MIT pledged their allegiance to ISIL and became a terrorist group. Their main figurehead was Santoso, though after his death and the arrests of other leaders, the remaining eleven members hid in the jungles surrounding Poso, Central Sulawesi. On 17 February 2021, the operation was renamed to Operation Madago Raya.

== Timeline ==
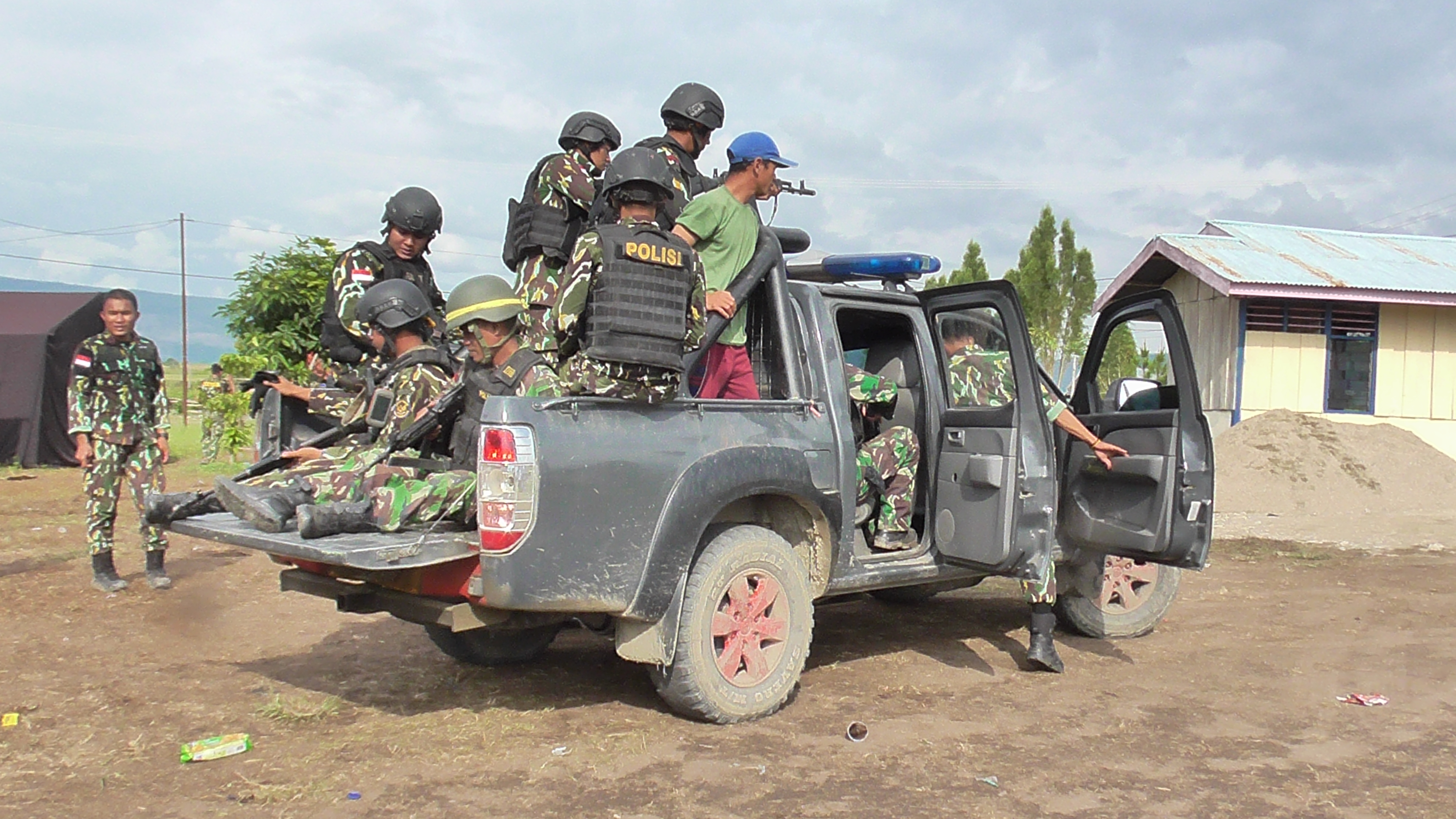
Indonesian Army and Mobile Brigade Corps personnel in Poso Regency during Operation Tinombala, 17 March 2016

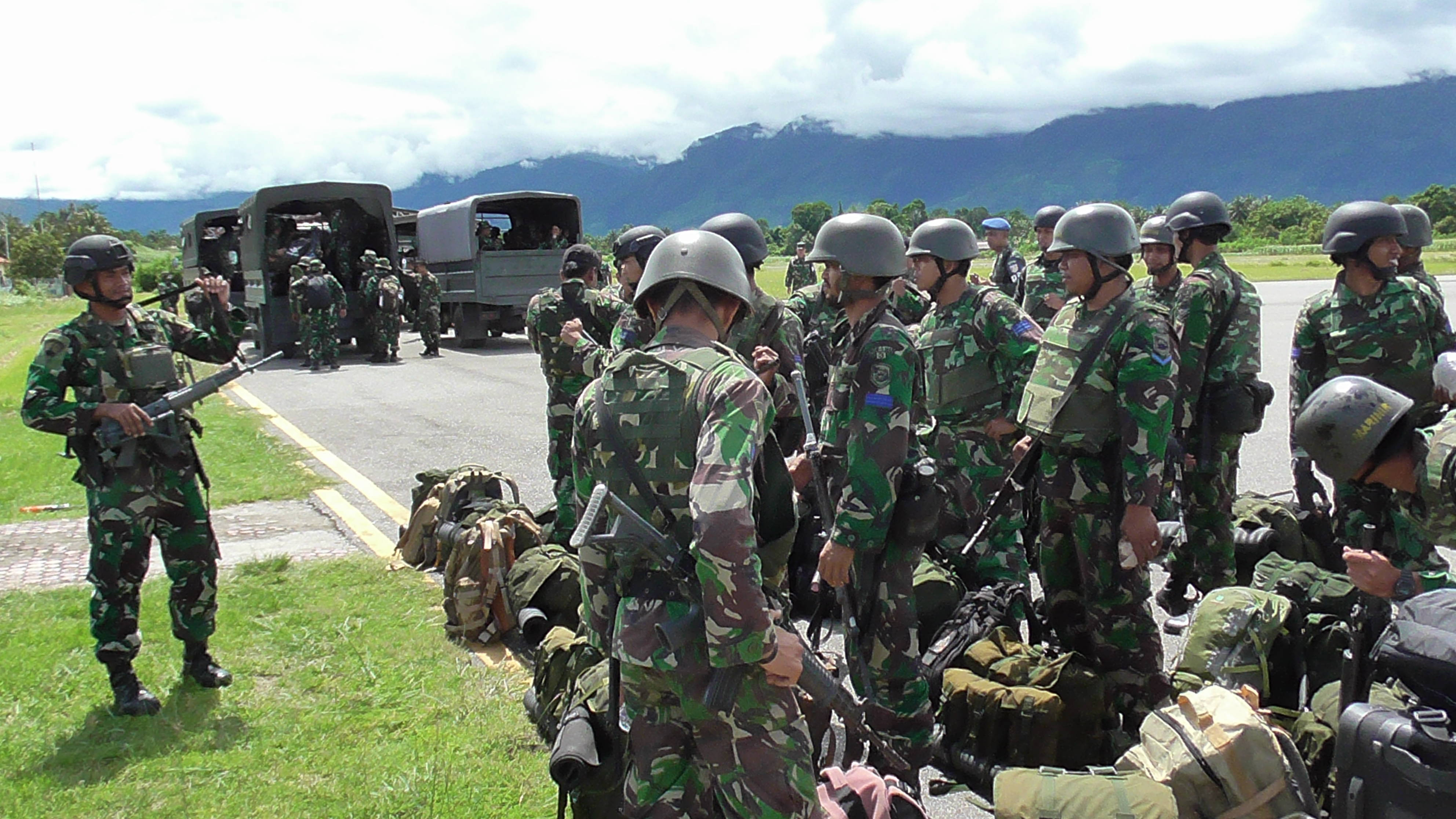
The arrival of 150 new TNI personnel from the Marine Corps in January 2016 who replaced TNI personnel who were withdrawn after 5 months on duty in the MIT hunt.

On 18 July 2016, Indonesian forces shot and killed MIT leader Santoso on Operation Alpha 29.

On 14 September 2016, Andika Eka Putra, one of the remaining members of the MIT, was killed.

On 19 September 2016, Sobron was killed by Operation Tinombala's Task Force.

On 16 May 2017, two MIT militants were killed in a gunfight with Indonesian forces in Poso. One Indonesian soldier was wounded.

On 3 August 2017, a farmer was killed after he was attacked by a terrorist in Parigi Moutong Regency.

On October 27 2020, Indonesian officials admitted that Indonesia had deported four Uighurs who were arrested in 2015, because they were suspected of joining the MIT, the deportation was carried out in September 2020 after the Chinese government was willing to pay the detainees fines.

On 1 March 2021, a gunfight occurred between the Indonesian Army and East Indonesia Mujahideen in the Andole Mountain area, Poso Regency, Central Sulawesi. As a result, two militants and one soldier died.

On 11 July 2021, a gunfight occurred between the Indonesian Army and East Indonesia Mujahideen in the Batu Mountain area, Parigi Moutong Regency. As a result, two militants died.

On 17 July 2021, a gunfight occurred between the Indonesian Army and East Indonesia Mujahideen, Parigi Moutong Regency. As a result, one militants died.

On 18 September 2021, a gunfight occurred between the Indonesian Army and East Indonesia Mujahideen in Torue District, Parigi Moutong Regency. As a result, two militants died including Ali Kalora, leader of the East Indonesia Mujahideen.

On 29 September 2022, a gunfight occurred between Detachment 88 and East Indonesia Mujahideen's last member in Kilo, Poso, Central Sulawesi. As a result last member of the militant group died. Even though the last member of East Indonesia Mujahideen have been killed, Operation Madago Raya still continued, Kombes Didik Supranoto said that the operation still continued in order to keep the community safe and to avoid the formation of a similar terrorist organization again.

== Casualties ==
As of May 19, 2022, the number of militants killed during the operation was of 49. Forty-one of those killed were East Indonesia Mujahideen members, while six were members of the Turkistan Islamic Party and the rest coming from other parts of Indonesia. At least 19 more were arrested.
