= Adji Pandu Suwotomo =

Indonesian Islamic militant

Adji Pandu Suwotomo or Maret Pamungkas (died 19 September 2016), better known as Sobron, was an Indonesian Islamic militant, and also member of the militant group based in Poso, Mujahidin Indonesia Timur (MIT). Sobron is one of those included on the police's most-wanted list (DPO) by the Indonesian Police, along with 44 (Note: 36 of them have been arrested, surrendered, or were killed.) other terrorists.

Sobron was born in Purbalingga. After graduating from elementary school, he continued his education at Purbalingga Junior High School, and Purbalingga Senior High School. However, he resigned when he was attending grade one, and became students at the boarding school. He said goodbye to his family, and said that he would go to Kalimantan.

After that, his whereabouts were unknown, until finally he was known to join the terrorist group led by Santoso, Mujahidin Indonesia Timur. His identity was later discovered after police released 31 photos of new DPO.

On 19 September 2016, the Task Force of Operation Tinombala Charlie 16, was patrolling in the plantation area of Tombua and suddenly met with Sobron. Sobron then cornered and took the grenade from his pocket and shouted, "God is great!" in Arabic after he was asked to surrender by the task force. Yet had time to throw grenades, Task Force then shot him in the head because he didn't want to surrender. On his body was found four grenades and two machetes.

On September 20, 2016, day after his death, Purbalingga police chief, Adj. Sr. Comm. Agus Heru Setiawan, confirmed that Sobron is a citizen of Purbalingga.

On September 27, 2016, he was buried in his hometown in Kedungjampang, Karangreja village, Kutasari district, Purbalingga Regency. About 200 people seemed to accompany Sobron's funeral shouting Takbir.

With the death of Sobron, MIT leaving only 11 still to be hunted by the Tinombala Task Force.
