= Longki Djanggola =

Indonesian politician

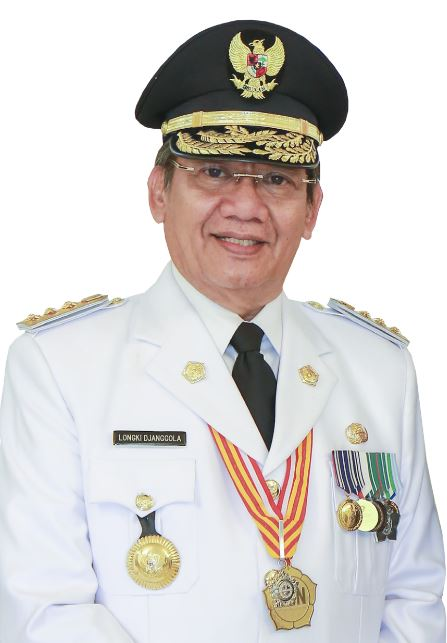

Governor of Central Sulawesi
- In office 17 June 2011 – 16 June 2021
- President: Susilo Bambang Yudhoyono; Joko Widodo
- Preceded by: Bandjela Paliudju
- Succeeded by: Rusdy Mastura

Personal details
- Born: 11 November 1952 (age 73) Palu, Central Sulawesi, Indonesia
- Citizenship: Indonesian
- Party: Great Indonesia Movement Party
- Spouse: Zalzulmida Djanggola
- Education: University of Indonesia; Hasanuddin University

Longki Djanggola is an Indonesian politician and currently the governor of Central Sulawesi. He was responsible for launching the province's joint Chinese-Indonesian nickel smelter at Morowali Industrial Park in 2015.

Djanggola was also the presiding civilian official over the efforts to apprehend members of Mujahidin Indonesia Timur (MIT), encouraging their membership at large to surrender after several of their leaders were eliminated during Operation Tinombala. A portion of MIT's leaders were arrested in addition to some who were killed during shootouts with the police, and Djanggola praised the Operation for its relatively humane approach.
