= Koopssus =

Special Operations Command
- Komando Operasi Khusus (Koopssus)
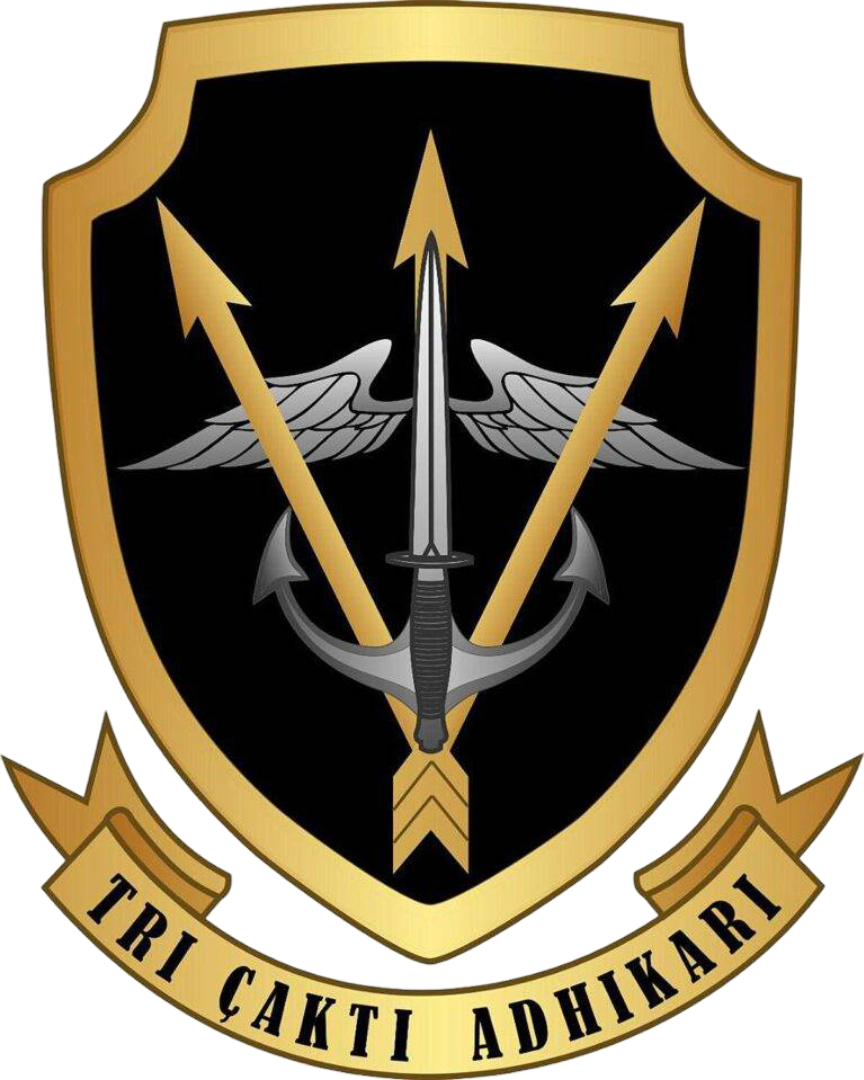
- Insignia of the Koopssus TNI
- Active: 30 July 2019 – present
- Country: Indonesia
- Type: Sub-unified combatant command
- Role: Special Operations Forces
- Size: Classified
- Part of: Indonesian National Armed Forces
- Garrison/HQ: Cilangkap, East Jakarta
- Nickname: Koopssus
- Mottos: Tri Çakti Adhikari (Three powerful strengths); Terpilih, Bersatu, Menang (Chosen, United, Win)
- Engagements: Papua conflict; Operation Madago Raya; 2020 evacuation from Wuhan; 2021 evacuation from Afghanistan

Commanders
- Commandant: Maj.Gen. Yudha Airlangga
- Deputy Commandant: Air Commodore Moch Djuanda

The Koopssus (Indonesian: Komando Operasi Khusus, lit. 'Special Operations Command'), is a special forces unit of the Indonesian National Armed Forces (TNI) with counter-terrorism duties. The unit operates and was formed similarly to the United States Joint Special Operations Command (JSOC) to execute special operations missions worldwide.

== History ==
The idea of forming a joint special operations command had previously existed in 2015 with the establishment of Koopssusgab (Indonesian: Komando Operasi Khusus Gabungan, lit.: Joint Special Operations Command), which was inaugurated by the former Commander of the Indonesian National Armed Forces, General Moeldoko on 6 June 2015. At that time, this force consisted of 90 people who would serve in operational status. However, due to several risk exposures associated with the risk of human rights violation, TNI involvement could potentially cause conflict between TNI and POLRI because both have different operational doctrines, and lack of legal basis regulating TNI's role in counter-terrorism could turn the operation into war; the unit was frozen and disbanded after Moeldoko replaced by the new Commander of the Indonesian National Armed Forces General Gatot Nurmantyo since 8 July 2015.

Following the series of terrorist attacks during Surabaya bombings on 13–14 May 2018, the revision of law on anti-terror proposed by the government on 15 May 2018, and the re-establishment of a Special Operations Command was again discussed by the Legislators at the Indonesian House of Representatives since 16 May 2018. Revisions to Indonesia's anti-terror laws (Law Number 5 of 2018) which were passed on 25 May 2018, allowed the military to be formally involved in counter-terrorism operations. Until then, the Indonesian National Police’s elite wing, the Detachment 88 (Densus 88), had been the country's lead security unit in pursuing terrorists.

The first insignia of the Koopssus during their public unveiling in 2019.

The Special Operations Command (Koopssus TNI) then officially established on 30 July 2019, through President Regulation Number 42 of 2019 signed by President of Indonesia Joko Widodo dated 3 July 2019, and Commander of the Indonesian National Armed Forces Regulation Number 19 of 2019 issued by Air Chief Marshal Hadi Tjahjanto dated 19 July 2019; clarifying the military's expanded role in counter-terrorism and the organization and duties of the Indonesian National Armed Forces Special Operations Command. Koopssus is to be coordinated with the Indonesian National Police in carrying out its mission of responding to high-intensity terror acts.

== Mission ==
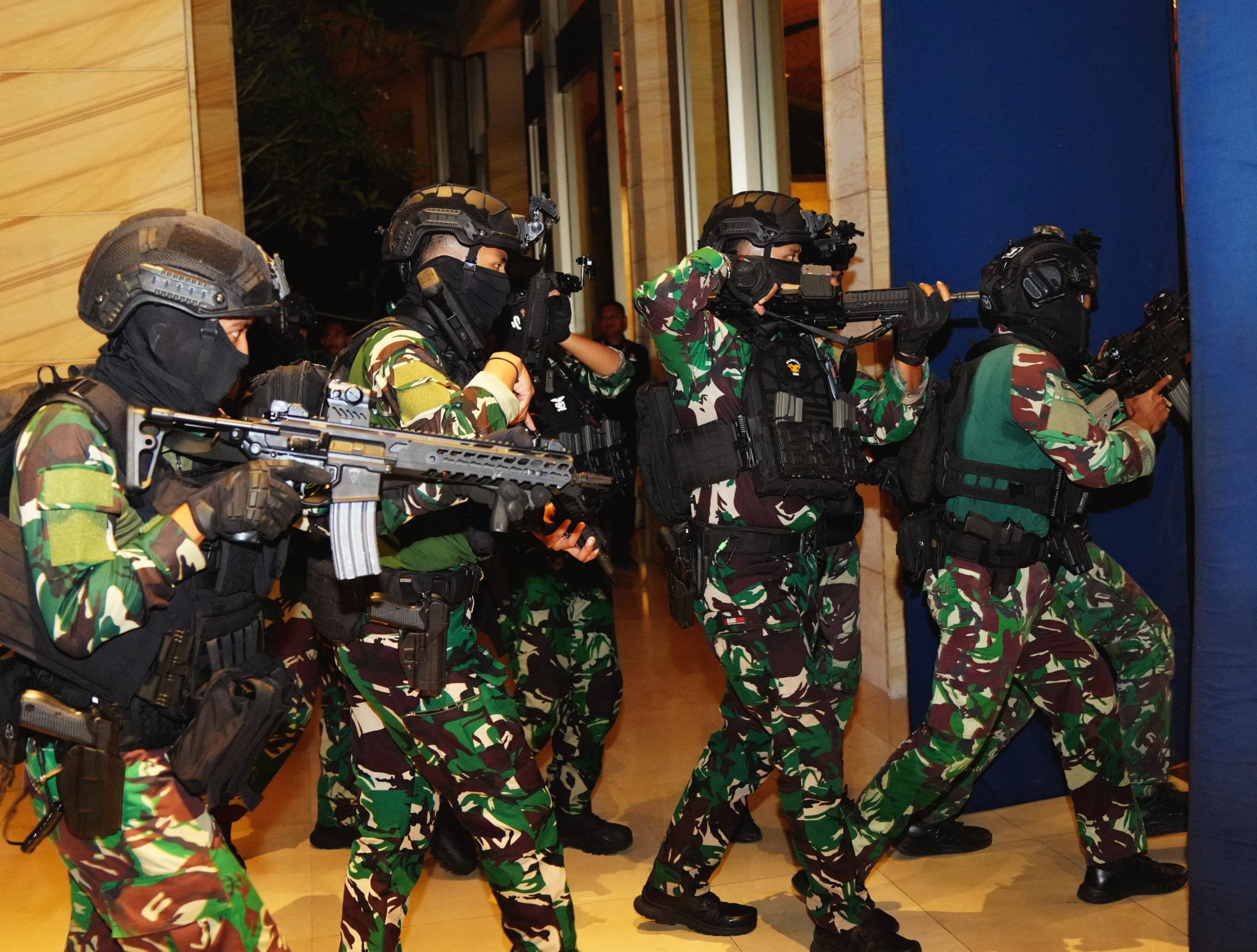
Koopssus operators carried out preparations of VVIP security and evacuation operation for the High-Level Forum Multi-Stakeholder Partnership (HLF MSP) and the 2nd Indonesia–Africa Forum (IAF) High-Level Conference 2024, at Mulia Hotel, Bali, 30 August 2024.

According to Presidential Regulation of the Republic of Indonesia Number 42 of 2019, concerning "The Second Amendment to Presidential Regulation Number 10 of 2010 concerning the Organizational Structure of the Indonesian National Armed Forces", Article 46B:

Paragraph (1)

"The Indonesian National Armed Forces Special Operations Command, called as Koopssus TNI, is tasked with carrying out special operations and activities to support the implementation of special operations that require high speed and success in order to safeguard national interests both within and outside the territory of the Unitary State of the Republic of Indonesia in order to support the main tasks of the TNI."

Paragraph (2)

"The Koopssus TNI is led by the Commandant of the Koopssus TNI, called as Dankoopssus TNI, who is subordinate to and responsible to the Commander of the Indonesian National Armed Forces. In carrying out daily tasks, he is coordinated by the Chief of General Staff of the Indonesian National Armed Forces."

Paragraph (3)

"Dankoopssus TNI is assisted by the Deputy Commandant of the Koopssus TNI, called as Wadankoopssus TNI."

== Organization ==
According to Commander of the Indonesian National Armed Forces Air Marshal Hadi Tjahjanto, the Koopssus consists of 500 personnel drawn from the army, navy and air force. About 400 Koopssus personnel carry out preventive measures, including surveillance and intelligence, while the remaining 100 members are tasked with confronting terrorist acts.

=== Organization Structure ===
Based on Commander of the Indonesian National Armed Forces Regulation Number 19 of 2019, Koopssus organization divided into 4 parts: Leadership, Assistants, Servicing Echelons, and Executive Operators. For Executive Operators, only 1 out of 7 executive operators is permanent body member of the Koopssus, while other executive operators are non-permanent body members provided by Indonesian National Armed Forces. Koopssus consisted by:

1. Leadership Elements
  1. Office of the Commandant of Koopssus
  2. Office of the Deputy Commandant of Koopssus
2. Assistants to the Commandant (Planning, Operations, Personnel, Logistics, Communication and Electronics)
3. Servicing Echelons
  1. Koopssus HQ Detachment
  2. Administration Staff Coordinator
4. Executive Operators
  1. Permanent Intelligence Force Command
  2. Special Force Command (Non-permanent, per assignment basis)
    1. Sat-81
    2. Denjaka
    3. Bravo Detachment 90
  3. Force Strengthening Command (Non-permanent, per assignment basis)
  4. Special Sea Operation Force Command (Non-permanent, per assignment basis)
  5. Special Air Operation Force Command (Non-permanent, per assignment basis)
  6. Special Force Assistance Operation Command (Non-permanent, per assignment basis)
  7. Supporting Command (Non-permanent, per assignment basis)

=== Commandant ===
According to the appendix of President Regulation Number 42 of 2019 stipulates that the Commandant of the Koopssus TNI (Dankoopssus TNI) should be a two-star general, while the Deputy Commandant of the Koopssus TNI (Wadankoopssus TNI) should be a one-star general. Brigadier General Rochadi was appointed on 30 July 2019 and promoted to Major General as the unit's first Commandant.

== List of Commandant ==
List of Commandant of the Koopssus TNI since established
No.	Portrait	Rank	Name	Term of Office			Defense Branch	Remarks
No.	Portrait	Rank	Name	Start of Term	End of Term	Time in office	Defense Branch	Remarks
1.		Major General	Rochadi	30 July 2019	18 June 2020	354 days	Army	
2.		Major General	Richard Taruli Horja Tampubolon	27 July 2020	6 December 2021	1 year, 132 days	Army	
3.		Major General	Joko Purwo Putranto	6 December 2021	17 November 2023	1 year, 346 days	Army	
4.		Major General	Suhardi	17 November 2023	6 December 2024	1 year, 19 days	Army	
5.	100x	Major General	Hendy Antariksa	6 December 2024	27 May 2025	172 days	Army	
6.		Major General	Yudha Airlangga	27 May 2025	Incumbent	1 year, 133 days	Army	

== Equipment ==
When the unit was formed, the operators adopted a pixelated camouflage uniform, it is inspired by the Malvinas-pattern camouflage. The Koopssus operators equipped with their designated weaponry such as HK416, SIG516, SIG MCX, DSAR-15P or any designated weapon and equipment from each of their relevant unit they came from (Sat-81 Gultor Kopassus, Denjaka, Bravo Detachment 90) to be used for specific missions.

== Reactions ==
The speaker of the House of Representatives, Bambang Soesatyo, said he hoped that the formation of Koopssus would also strengthen the monitoring of cyberspace.

According to Air Chief Marshal Hadi Tjahjanto, the establishment of the unit is an implementation of the 11 Priority Programs, a military program to deal with a spectrum of threats.

== See also ==
- Kopassus
- Denjaka
- Bravo Detachment 90
