= Mobile Brigade Corps =

Special tactical unit of the Indonesian National Police

- Korps Brigade Mobil (Indonesian)
- Emblem of the Mobile Brigade Corps
- Active: 14 November 1945; 81 years ago
- Country: Indonesia
- Agency: Indonesian National Police
- Type: Police tactical unit
- Headquarters: Mako Brimob, Cimanggis, Depok, West Java
- Motto: Jiwa Ragaku Demi Kemanusiaan (My life and soul is for the sake of humanity); Sekali Tampil Harus Berhasil (Once we perform, we must succeed)
- Common name: Brimob

Structure
- Officers: 53,593 (2024)

Commanders
- Current commander: Pol. Com. Gen. Imam Widodo

Notables
- Significant operation(s): Indonesian national revolution; Battle of Surabaya; Madiun affair; Darul Islam rebellion; PRRI rebellion; Permesta rebellion; Invasion of Ambon; Operation Trikora; Insurgency in Papua; Operation Cartenz's Peace; Indonesia-Malaysia confrontation; 30 September Movement; Indonesian mass killings of 1965–66; APRA coup d'état; Occupation of East Timor; Insurgency in Aceh; May 1998 riots of Indonesia; Post-Suharto era internal conflict; Communal conflict in Poso; Maluku sectarian conflict; Sambas riots; Sampit conflict; War on Terror in Indonesia; Talangsari incident; Operation Madago Raya; 2016 Jakarta attacks; November 2016 Jakarta protests; May 2019 Jakarta protests and riots; September 2019 Indonesian protests and riots; 2025 Indonesian protests; 2026 Indonesia wiretapping incident; UN peacekeeping forces
- Anniversaries: 14 November

Website
- korbrimob.polri.go.id

The Mobile Brigade Corps (Indonesian: Korps Brigade Mobil; Brimob) is a Police field force whose duties include special operations, paramilitary, and tactical units of the Indonesian National Police (Polri). It is one of the oldest existing units within Polri. Some of its main duties are counter-terrorism, riot control, high-risk law enforcement where the use of firearms are present, search and rescue, hostage rescue, and bomb disposal operations. The Mobile Brigade Corps is a large component of the Indonesian National Police trained for counter-separatist and counter-insurgency duties, often in conjunction with military operations.

The Mobile Brigade Corps consists of two branches, Gegana and Pelopor. Gegana is tasked with carrying out more specific special police operations tasks such as Bomb Disposal, CBR Handling (Chemistry, Biology, and Radioactivity), Anti-Terror (Counter Terrorism), and Intelligence. Meanwhile, the Pelopor are tasked with carrying out broader and paramilitary operations, such as riot control, Search and Rescue (SAR), security of vital installations, and counter-guerrilla operations. Brimob is classified as a Police Tactical Unit (PTU) and is operationally a Police Special Weapons and Tactics (SWAT) unit (including Densus 88 and Gegana Brimob) which supports other general police units. Each regional police (Polda) in Indonesia has its own Brimob unit.

== History ==
Formed in late 1945 as a special police corps named Pasukan Polisi Istimewa (Special Police Troops) with the task of disarming remnants of the Japanese Imperial Army and protecting the chief of state and the capital city. Under the Japanese, it was called Special Police Unit (特別警察隊, Tokubetsu Keisatsutai; not to be confused with the IJN Tokkeitai). It fought in the revolution and was the first military unit to engage in the Battle of Surabaya under the command of Police Inspector Moehammad Jasin.

On 14 November 1946, Prime Minister Sutan Sjahrir reorganised all Polisi Istimewa, Barisan Polisi Istimewa and Pasukan Polisi Istimewa, merged into the Mobile Brigade (Mobrig). This day is celebrated as the anniversary of this Blue Beret Corps. This Corps was reconstituted to suppress military and police conflicts and even coups d'etat.

On 1 December 1947, Mobrig was militarized and later deployed in various conflicts and confrontations like the PKI rebellion in Madiun, the Darul Islam rebellion (1947), the APRA coup d'état and proclamation of the Republic of South Maluku (1950), the PRRI rebellion (1953), and the Permesta (1958).

As of 14 November 1961, the Mobrig changed its name to Korps Brigade Mobil (Brimob), and its troops took part in the military confrontation with Malaysia in the early 1960s and in the conflict in East Timor in the mid-1970s. After that, Brimob was placed under the command of the Indonesian National Police.

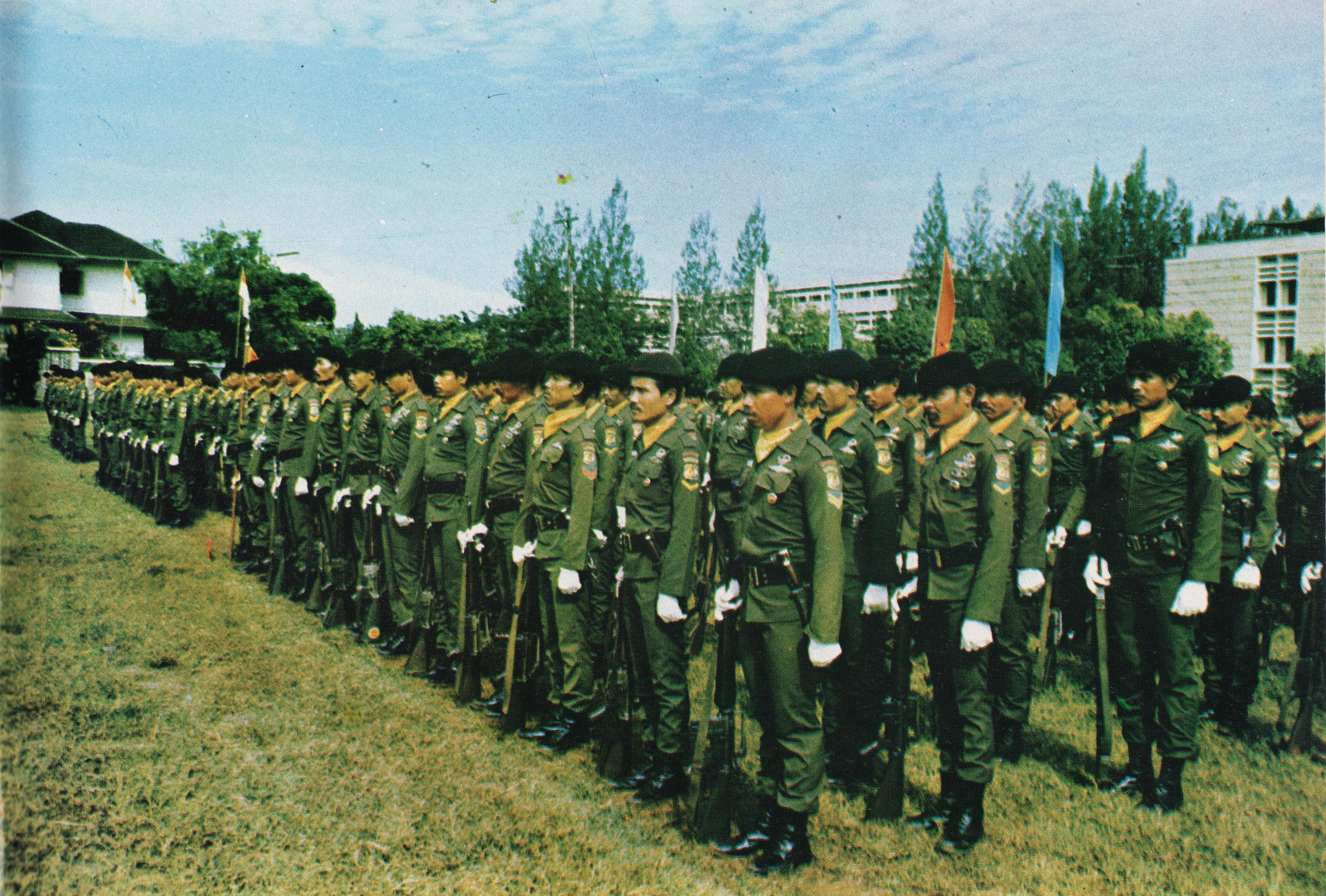
Brimob personnel, circa 1976

The Mobile Brigade, which began forming in late 1946 and was used during the anti-Dutch Revolution, started sending students for US Army SF training on Okinawa in January 1959. In April 1960 a second contingent arrived for two months of Ranger training. By the mid-1960s the three-battalion Mobile Brigade, commonly known as Brimob, had been converted into an elite shock force. A Brimob airborne training centre was established in Bandung. Following the 1965 coup attempt, one Brimob battalion was used during anti-Communist operations in West Kalimantan. In December 1975 a Brimob battalion was used during the East Timor operation. During the late 1970s, Brimob assumed VIP security and urban anti-terrorist duties. In 1989, Brimob still contained airborne-qualified elements. Pelopor ('Ranger') and airborne training takes place in Bandung and at a training camp outside Jakarta. Historically, Brimob wore the Indonesian spot camouflage pattern during the early 1960s as their uniform.

In 1981, the Mobile Brigade spawned a new unit called the "Jihandak" (Penjinak Bahan Peledak), an explosive ordnance disposal (EOD) unit.

== Task ==
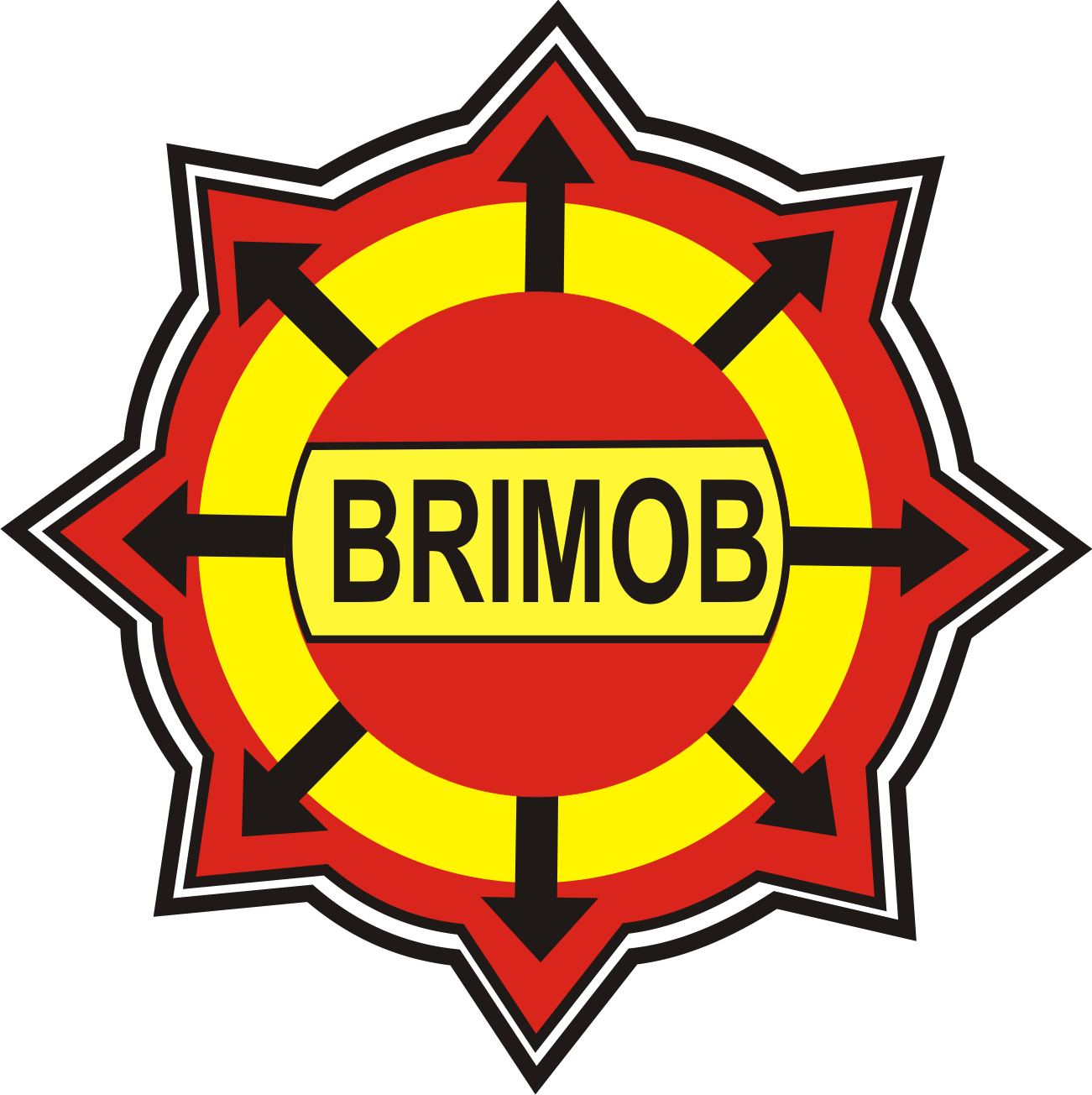
Badge of Brimob

The Implementation and mobilization of the Brimob Corps is to cope with high-level interruption of society mainly: mass riots, organized crime armed with fire, search and rescue, explosives, chemicals, biological and radioactive threats along with other police operational implementing elements in order to realize legal order and peace of society throughout juridical of Indonesia and other tasks assigned to the corps.

=== Qualifications ===
The Pelopor qualifications, which are the basic capabilities of every Brimob member, are the following basic skills:

1. Ability to navigate with map and compass
2. Intelligence
3. Anti-terror (counter-terrorism)
4. Riot control
5. Guerrilla war, Close / Urban war tactics
6. Bomb disposal
7. Handle high intensity crimes where the use of firearms is present
8. Search and rescue
9. Surveillance, disguise and prosecution.
10. VIP/VVIP Protective Service
11. National Vital Object Protection
12. Other individual and unit capabilities.

== Function ==
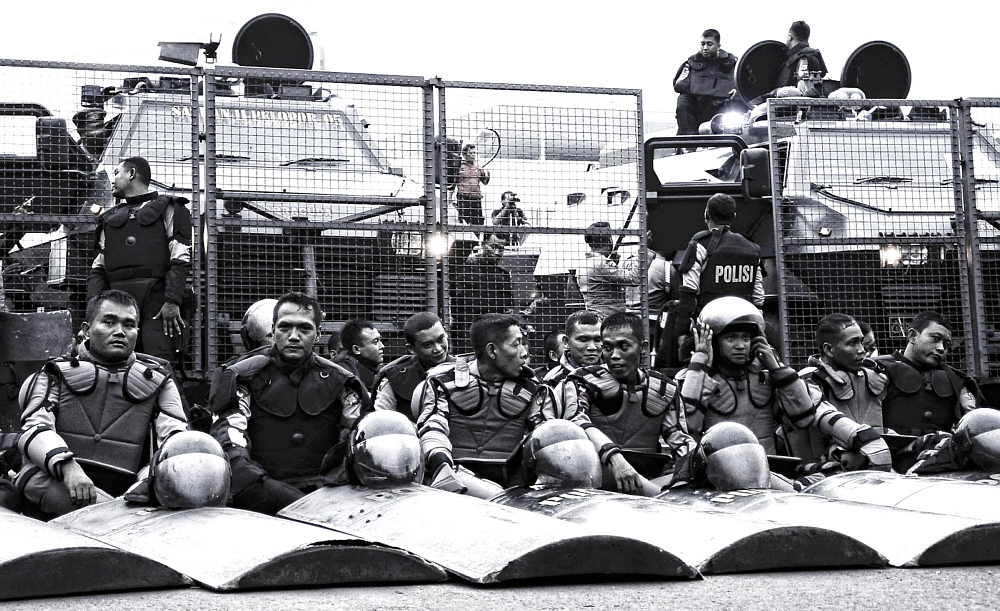
Brimob riot control personnel

The Mobile Brigade Corps serves as the primary operational unit of the Indonesian National Police (Polri). It is responsible for riot control, counter-terrorism, bomb disposal, and search and rescue operations, with personnel receiving specialized training in domestic security and emergency response.

== Role ==
The role of Brimob is together with other police functions is to act against high-level criminals, mainly mass riots, organized crime of firearms, bombs, chemicals, biology and radio active threats in order to realize the legal order and peace of society in all juridical areas of Indonesia. Roles undertaken include:

1. Role to help other police functions,
2. Role to protect the VIP/VVIP And National Vital Object
3. Role to complement in territorial police operations carried out in conjunction with other police functions,
4. Role to protect members of other police units as well civilians who are under threat,
5. Role to strengthen other police functions in the implementation of regional operational tasks,
6. Serve to replace and handle territorial police duties if the situation or task objective has already led to a high-grade crime.

== Organisation ==
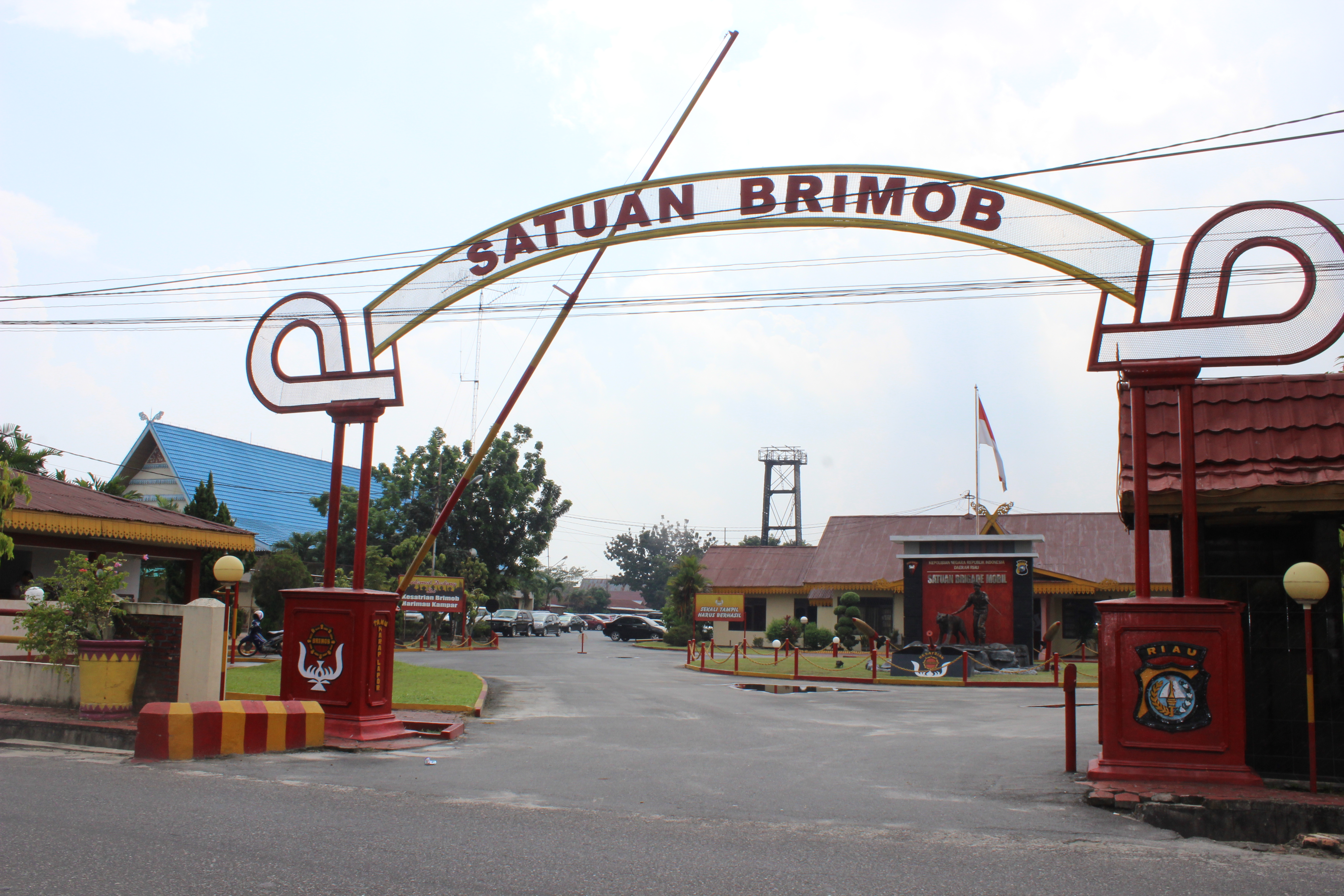
A Brimob Headquarters in Pekanbaru, Riau

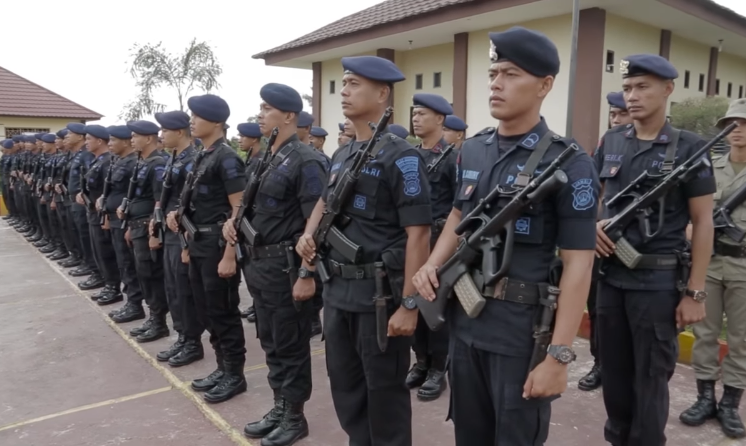
Brimob personnel

In 1992 the Mobile Brigade was essentially a paramilitary organisation trained and organised along military lines. It had a strength of about 12,000. The brigade was used primarily as an elite unit for emergencies and supporting police operations as a rapid response unit. The unit was mainly deployed for domestic security and defense operations, but now has gained and achieved many specialties in the scope of policing duties such as implementing SWAT operations, Search and Rescue operations, Riot control and CBR (Chemical, biological and radiological) defense. Brimob also are usually sent to do domestic security operations with the TNI.

Since the May 1998 upheaval, PHH (Pasukan Anti Huru-Hara, Anti Riot Unit) have received special anti-riot training. Elements of the unit are cross trained for airborne and Search and Rescue operations. In each Police HQ that represents a province (which is known as POLDA) in Indonesia each has an organized BRIMOB force which consists of a command headquarters, several Detachments of Pelopor police personnel organized into a regiment and usually 1 or 2 detachments of GEGANA.

The Chief of the Indonesian National Police, known as KAPOLRI, has the highest command in each police operation including BRIMOB, orders are delivered by the police chief and then executed by his Operational Assistant Agent with then further notification to the Corps Commandant and then to the concerned regional commanders.

=== National level units ===
- Corps HQ and HQ Services
  - Brimob Corps Training School
  - Gegana Regiment
    - HHC
  - Pelopor Brigade
    - Brigade HQ and HQ Company
    - I (1st) Pelopor Regiment
    - II (2nd) Pelopor Regiment
    - III (3rd) Pelopor Regiment
    - IV (4th) Pelopor Regiment
  - Intelligence Unit
  - Training Command

=== Pelopor ===
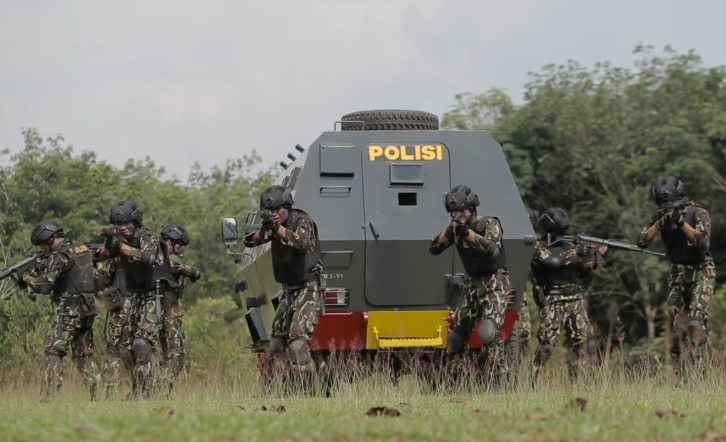
Pelopor troops

Pelopor (lit."Pioneer") is the main reaction force of the Mobile Brigade Corps, it acts as a troop formation and has the roles of mainly riot control and conducting paramilitary operations assigned to the corps to cope with high-level threat of society disturbance. It also specializes in the field of Guerrilla, and Search and Rescue (SAR) operations. There are today 4 national regiments of Pelopor in the Brimob corps which are:

- I' Pelopor Regiment
- II Pelopor Regiment
- III Pelopor Regiment
- IV Pelopor Regiment

In a historical view, this unit was called as "Brimob Rangers" during the Post Independence era. In 1959, during its first formation, Brimob Rangers troops conducted a test mission in the area of Cibeber, Ciawi and Cikatomas which borders Tasikmalaya-Garut in West Java. It was the baptism of fire of the Rangers, in which the newly acquired skills of guerrilla warfare and counter-insurgency operations were applied against remnants of Darul Islam in these communities. The actions against the Islamic Army of Indonesia (TII) units in the province weakened the DI even further, leading the total collapse of the local DI provincial chapter in 1962, ending a decade-long war of violence there.

The official first forward deployment of the Brimob Rangers was the Fourth Military Operations Movement in South Sumatra, West Sumatra and North Sumatra (in response to the Permesta rebellion of 1958). It was the Brimob Rangers troops became part of the Bangka Belitung Infantry Battalion led by Lieutenant Colonel (Inf) Dani Effendi. Rangers were tasked to capture the remains of the PRRI prison in Sumatra's forests led by Major Malik, which was then under rebel hands.

In 1961, under the express orders of then Chief of Police General Soekarno Djoyonegoro, Brimob Rangers troops were officially renamed Pelopor Troops of the Mobile Brigade. This is in accordance with the wishes of President Sukarno who wanted Indonesian names for units within both the TNI (Indonesian National Armed Forces) and POLRI (Indonesian National Police). At this time also the Pelopor constables and NCOs received many brand new weapons for police and counter-insurgency operations, including the more famous AR-15 assault rifles. The subsequent assignment of this force was to infiltrate West Irian in Fak-Fak in May 1962 and engage in combat with the servicemen of the Royal Netherlands Army during Operation Trikora. The troops were also involved in the Confrontation of Malaysia in 1964 and at that time the Brimob Rangers troops (now Pelopor) in Indonesia faced the British Special Air Service.

Pelopor Troops play a role as a troop formation unit and is still active in the Brimob's operational system. Aside from the national regiments, each Police region has a Pelopor regiment of two to four battalions.

=== Gegana ===
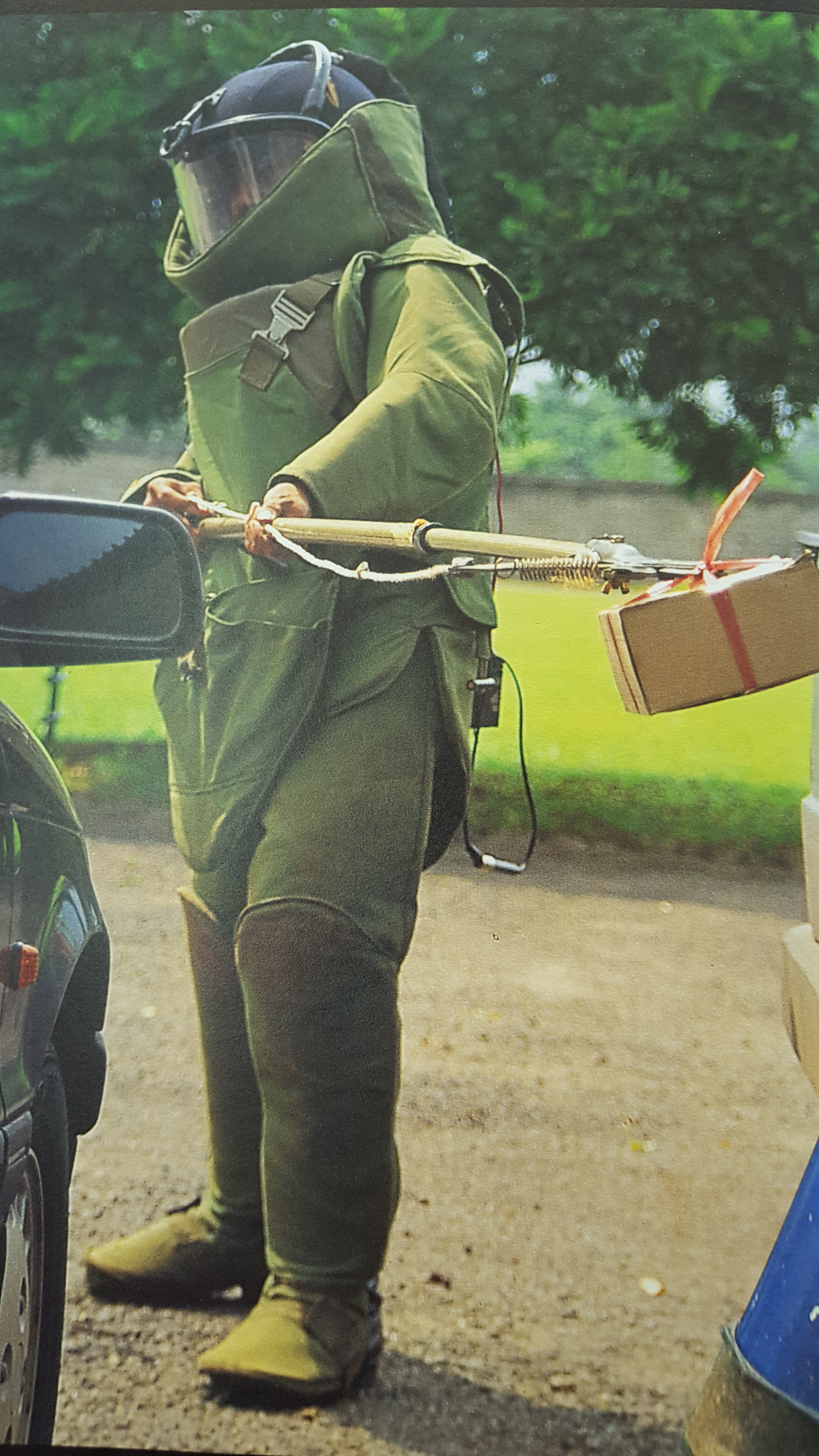
Gegana Bomb Disposal

Gegana is a special branch detachment within the Brimob corps which have special abilities mainly in bomb disposal and counter-terrorist operations. On the other hand, it also specializes in the field of hostage rescue, intelligence and CBR (Chemical, biological and radiological) defense. The national Gegana unit was for years organized into a battalion headquarters company and (five) company sized detachments which are:

- Intelligence Detachment
- Bomb Disposal Detachment
- Anti-Terror Detachment
- Anti-Anarchist Detachment
- CBR (Chemical, biological and radiological) Detachment

Today the national Gegana unit is reflagged as a regiment with 4-5 battalions.

This unit was formed in 1976 as a detachment. At first, it was meant to deal with aircraft hijacking. Later in 1995, with the expansion of Brimob, the Gegana Detachment was expanded to become the 2nd BRIMOB Regiment. However, there are a select few specialists who are very skilled in these specialties. Gegana until the 2020s did not have battalions or companies in the national level. The national battalion, alongside the HHC, was then organized into several detachments. Within each detachment they are split into sub-detachments (sub-den), and within each sub-den they are further sub-divided into several units. Each unit usually consists of 10 personnel. One sub-den consists of 40 personnel, and one detachment consists of about 280 personnel.

One operation is usually assigned to one unit. Therefore, from the 10 people in that unit, six are required to have special skills: two for EOD (Explosives and Ordnance Disposal), two for search and rescue operations, and two for counter-terrorist operations. In any operation, two experts are designated Operators One and Two while the rest of the unit members become the Support Team.

For example, in counter-terrorism operations, the designated Operators must have sharp-shooting skills, ability to negotiate, and be an expert in storm-and-arrest procedures. These skills and operations are not meant to be lethal because the main goal of every Gegana operation is to arrest suspects and bring them to the court. Unless there is a situation that is compromised, Gegana avoids the use of lethal force.

In Search and Rescue operations, the personnel are required to have the basic capabilities of diving, rappelling, shooting, and first aid. In anti-bomb operation, the Operators have to be the expert in their respective fields. Each Gegana personnel has been introduced to various types of bombs in general, including the risks of handling them. There are specific procedures for handling each bomb, including the required timing.

Currently, Gegana's national regiment has three Explosive Ordnance Disposal (EOD) tactical vehicles.

Gegana battalions or companies are present in each provincial police unit.

=== Unit composition ===
Alongside the national units, regional formations of the Mobile Brigade are present in all 38 Regional Police Forces (Polda) in Indonesia which represent a province. In each BRIMOB unit of a Police HQ in a province (Polda), there are about several detachments of MBC Pelopor units (organized into a regiment) and usually 1 - 2 detachment of Gegana (small battalions or companies).

A Brimob unit of a regional police headquarters consists of the following:

1. Regional Mobile Brigade HQ Section (Si-yanma)
2. Planning and Administration Section (Subbagrenmin)
3. Intelligence Section (Si-intel)
4. Operational Section (Si-ops)
5. Provost (Internal affairs) Section (Si-provos)
6. Communications Technology Section (Si-tekkom)
7. Medical and Fitness Section (Si-kesjas)
8. Search and Rescue (SAR) Unit
9. Pelopor Regiment composed of:
  1. Regional Pelopor Regimental HQ
  2. A Detachment (Den-A)
  3. B Detachment (Den-B)
  4. C Detachment (Den-C)
  5. D Detachment (Den-D) (large departments only)
  6. Support units
10. Gegana Detachment (Den Gegana)
  1. Detachment HQ
  2. 1-3 Subdetachments/Platoons

For some regional police headquarters, Pelopor detachments only consists up-to "C" Detachments only (3 battalions each). But for bigger regional police HQs such as the Jakarta Regional Metropolitan Police (Polda Metro Jaya), it consists up-to "D" Detachment with a total of four (4) detachments. Each Pelopor Detachment consists of 4 (four) Companies, and each Company consists of 3 (three) Platoons. The Gegana detachment is organized as a company in most police regions, but in larger ones is organized as a full battalion of two detachments and a headquarters company.

In the 2020s, the regional organization was amended with regional divisional commands (Pasukan Brigade Mobil), under which each provincial brigade reports directly. The BRIMOB divisions are led by Police Brigadier Generals, and these divisional commanders report to the Commandant General BRIMOB.

Personnel

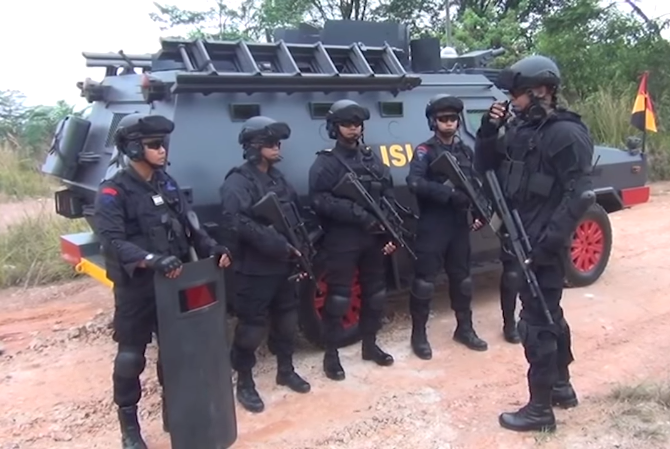
Gegana

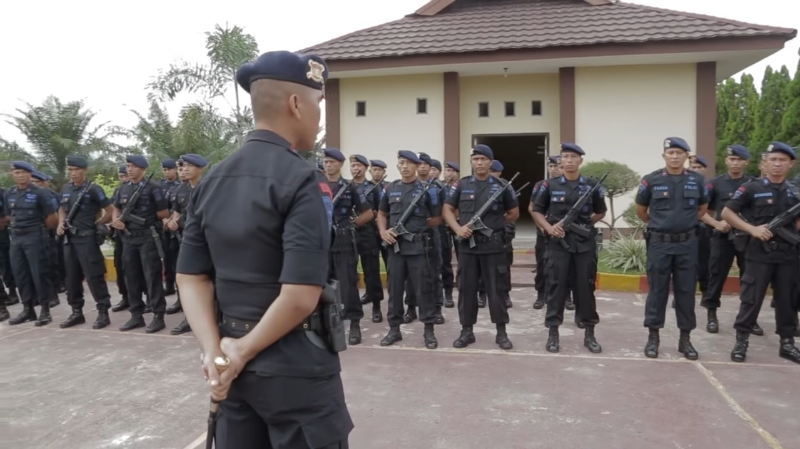
Pelopor

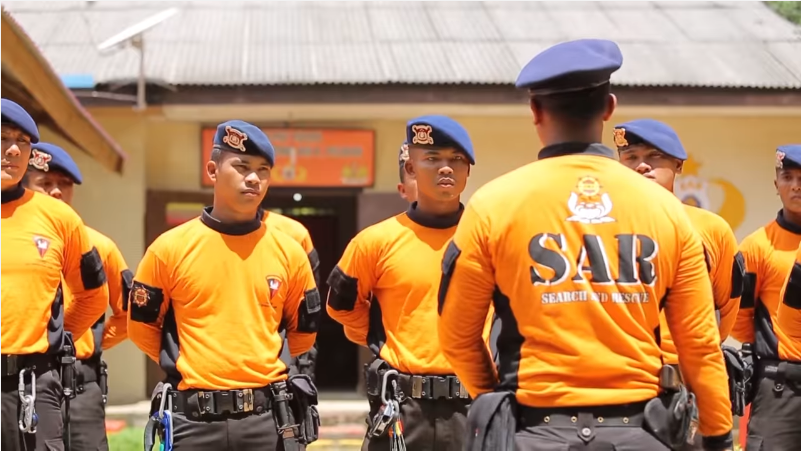
Search and Rescue (SAR) unit

== Controversies ==
=== Kanjuruhan Stadium disaster ===
In the Kanjuruhan Stadium disaster on 1 October 2022, police units, particularly Brimob as crowd control unit, deployed tear gas inside the stadium. This triggered a stampede as spectators tried to escape from the effects of the gas. A crush formed at one of the exits, leading to mass asphyxiation. The disaster claimed 135 lives, including two police officers and dozens of children under the age of 17. Several officers who operated the tear gas launcher were questioned. Only three officers were brought to trial, two senior officers (non-Brimob) and one Brimob commander. Of these, only the Brimob Commander was convicted, receiving a sentence of one year and six months for violating Article 359, Article 360 paragraph 1, and Article 360 paragraph 2 of the Criminal Code (KUHP), relating to negligence resulting in death or injury. On 16 January 2023, Brimob disrupted the court proceedings by chanting in the courtroom, an act described as intimidation.

=== Handling of August 2025 Indonesian protests ===
During August 2025 Indonesian Protest, Brimob deployed tactical vehicles to disperse the crowd. Affan Kurniawan, a 21-year-old Gojek delivery driver who was not involved in the demonstration, was fatally run over by a Rantis tactical vehicle while on his way to deliver food. Brimob was also reported to have used expired tear gas, and fired rubber bullets at protesters across Indonesia.

== Gallery ==
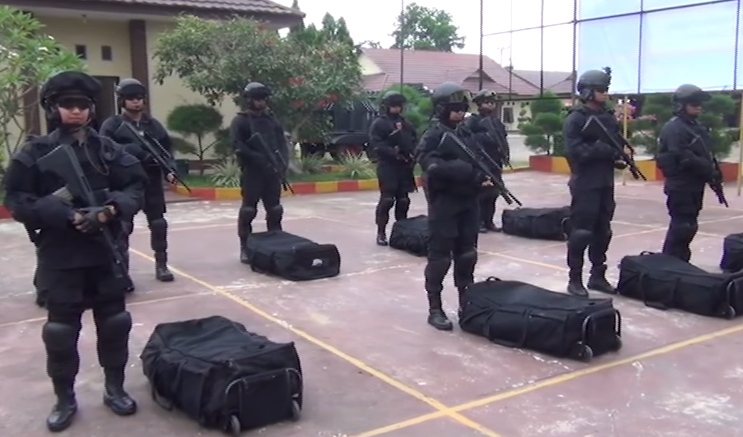
Gegana operators

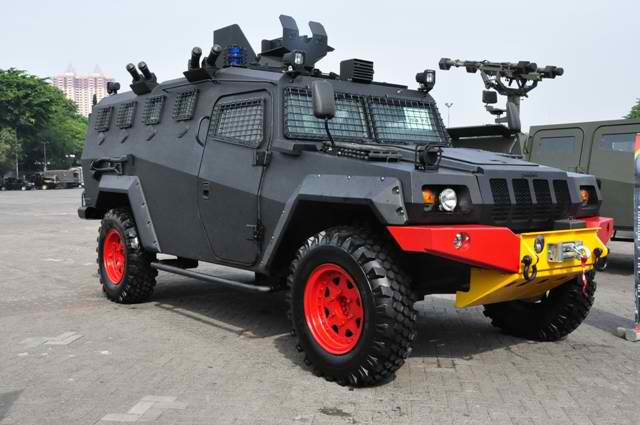
Brimob Pindad Komodo tactical vehicle

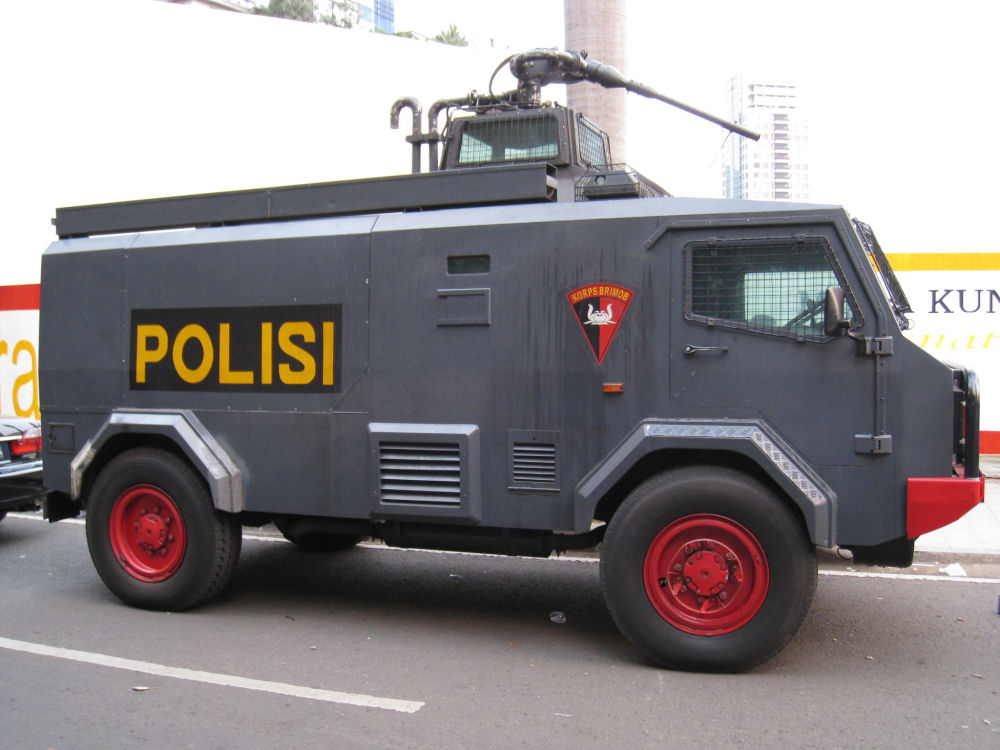
A Brimob Riot water cannon vehicle

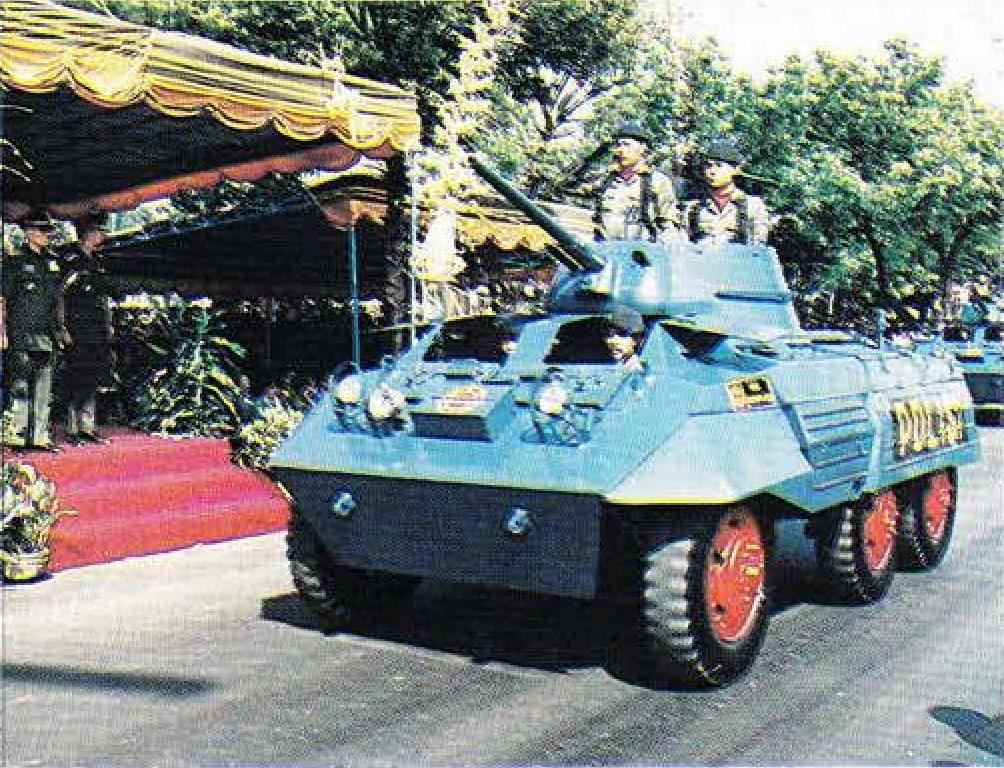
Brimob M8 Greyhound armored car during a parade c. 1990s

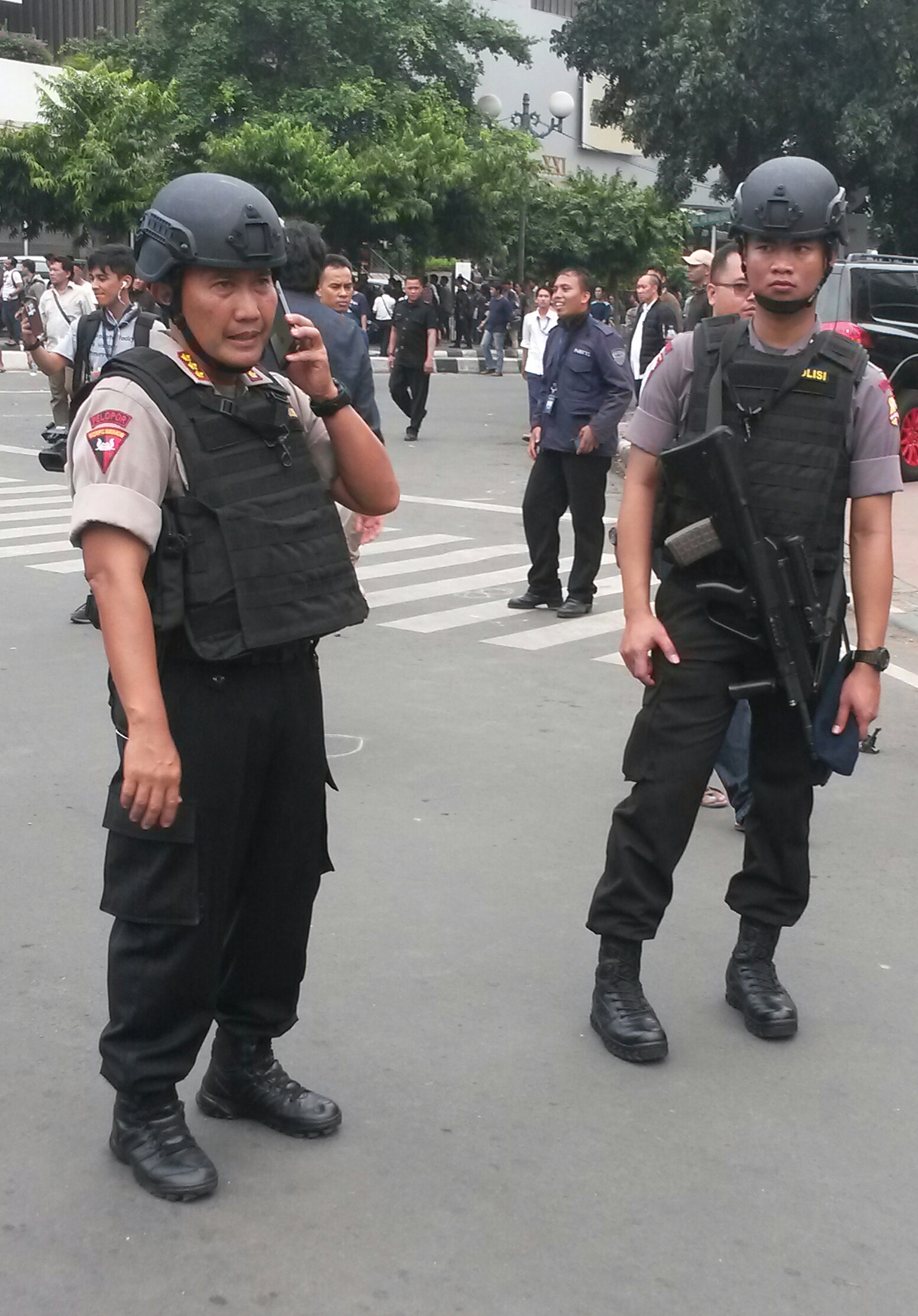
A Brimob officer and a Brimob constable during the 2016 Jakarta attacks

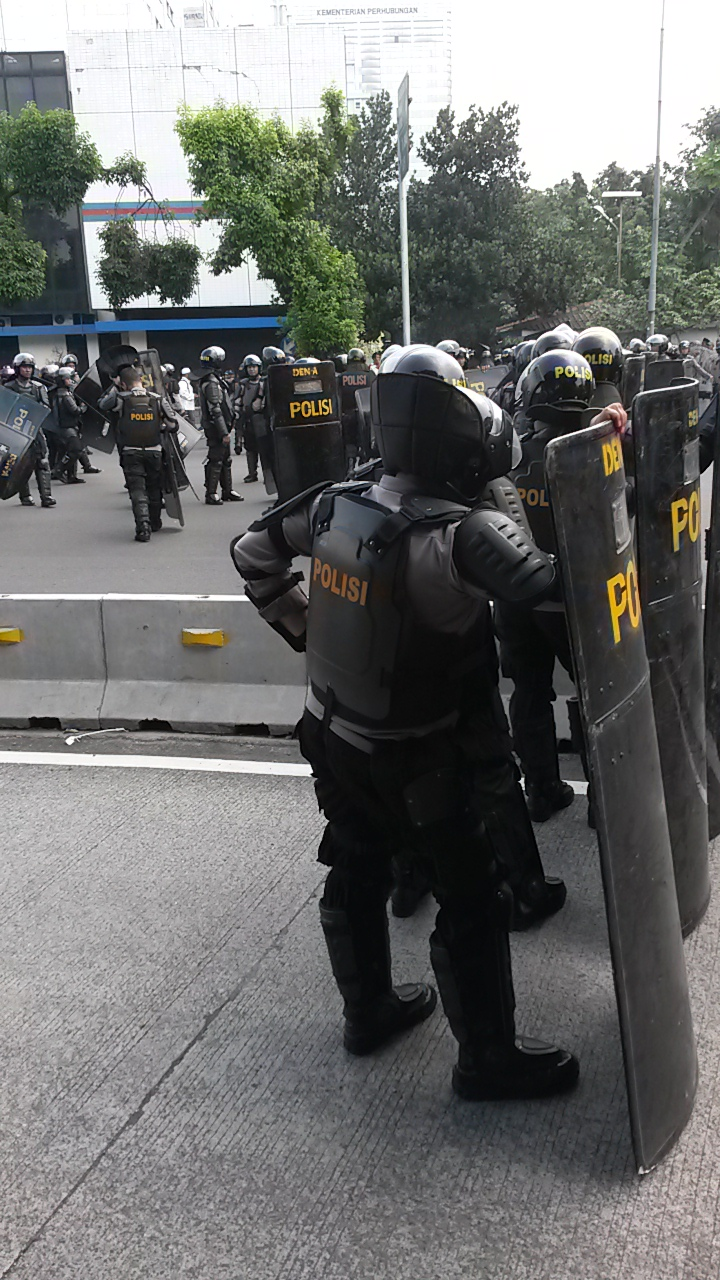
Brimob personnel during Riot control

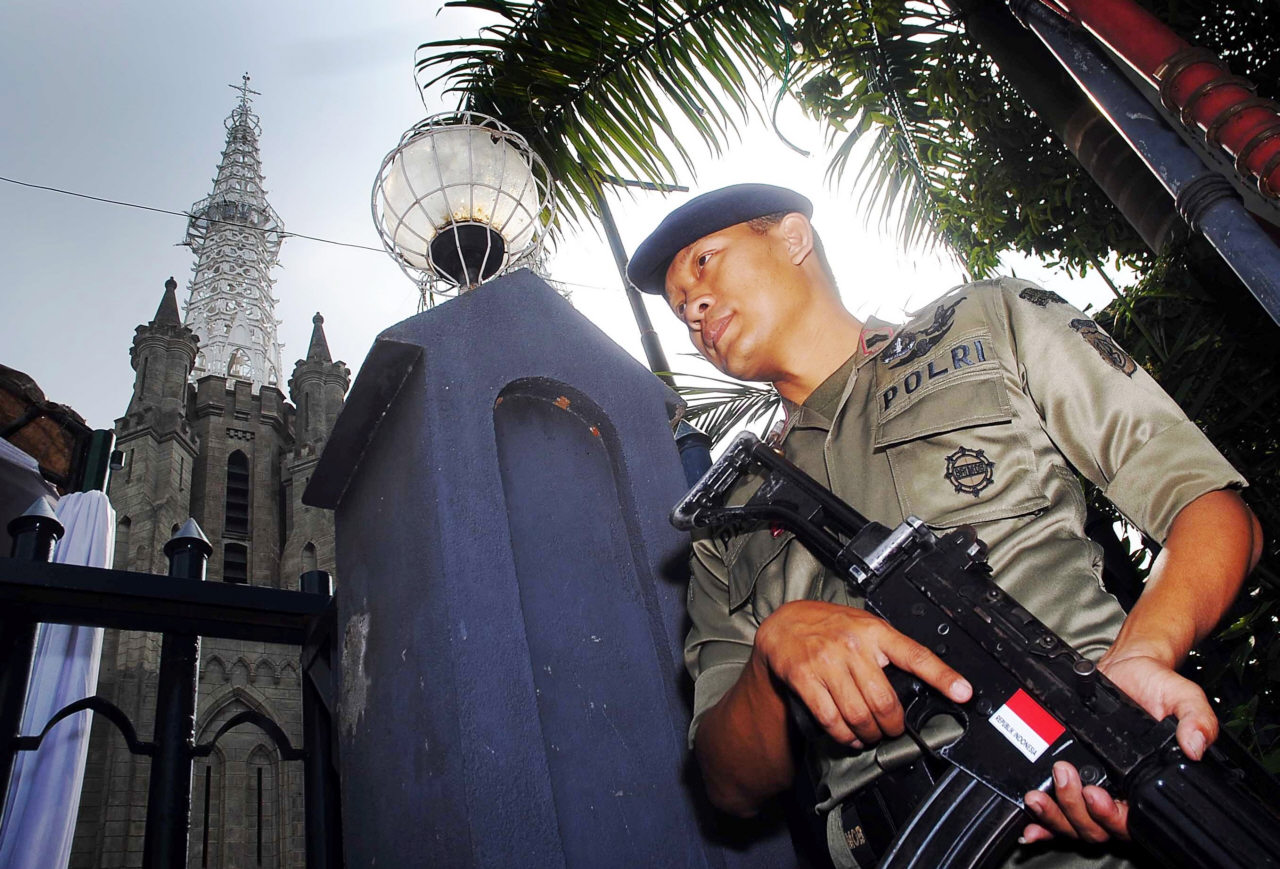
A Brimob personnel with a Pindad SS1 rifle guarding the Jakarta Cathedral.

== See also ==
- Detachment 88 or Densus 88, Indonesian special counter-terrorism squad
- Mobile Police Command, a Vietnamese equivalence to the BRIMOB
