= Abu Wardah =

Indonesian Islamic militant (1976–2016)

- أبو وردة
- Born: 21 August 1976; Tentena, Poso Regency, Central Sulawesi, Indonesia
- Died: 18 July 2016 (aged 39); Tambarana, Poso Regency, Central Sulawesi, Indonesia
- Cause of death: Gunshot wounds
- Other names: Santoso, Abu Wardah as-Syarqi, Abu Yahya
- Organization: East Indonesia Mujahideen
- Successor: Ali Kalora (2016–2021)

Santoso (21 August 1976 – 18 July 2016), known as Abu Wardah (Arabic: أبو وردة), was an Indonesian Islamic militant and the leader of East Indonesia Mujahideen (MIT). He pledged allegiance to ISIL in July 2014. He was killed on 18 July 2016 by the Indonesian Army after two years of hiding in the jungles near Poso, Central Sulawesi.

== History ==
Santoso was born 21 August 1976 in Tentena, Central Sulawesi, Indonesia. Tentena is about 7 hours by bus from the capital of Central Sulawesi, Palu. This small town of mostly Christians lies on the northern shores of Lake Poso. Tentena has a history of past conflicts with the surrounding Islamic villages.

=== Poso conflict ===
He participated in military training in 2001. He was involved in jihad during inter-religious conflict between Christians and Muslims in Poso from 1998 to 2001. It is known that he was inspired by the preaching of Abu Bakar Ba'asyir, Abdullah Sungkar, Imam Samudra, Azahari Husin and Noordin Mohammad Top.

Some reports say he studied Islam at Al-Mukmin Islamic school in Ngruki district, Surakarta, Central Java.

According to an interview with Andi Baso Tahir, an old friend of Santoso in Tokorondo village, in 2006 Santoso was arrested for robbing a boxcar in a coastal town of Poso. He was jailed for a year. According to the friend, after he left prison, Santoso stopped militancy for a period and "became a peddler, selling cleavers, cooking utensils and clothes".

The same friend places him in Masani village, a coastal town of Poso, in 2012, where Santoso supposedly suddenly turned up during a daurah [koran reading].

== Mujahidin Indonesia Timur ==
Later, Santoso went to Tamanjeka where he met Bado, alias Urwah. Both were involved in the killing of two police officers in Tamanjeka in November 2012. The bodies of First Brig. Andi Sapa and Brig. Sudirman were found in a shallow hole with their throats slit. 300 officers and Army personnel from Gunung Biru in Tamanjeka withdrew from the area after failing to find Santoso.

On 10 July 2013, it was reported Santoso had appeared in a six-minute video posted on YouTube. He described Detachment 88, the Indonesian Special Forces counter-terrorism squad, as "a real enemy, a real Satan". "My brothers in Poso, I have felt how cruel Detachment 88 is to these people," and "Today, God almighty has decided that jihad will continue until judgement day", he says in the video.

== ISIL ==
Santoso pledged allegiance to ISIL in July 2014.

According to the BBC, Bahrum Naim is said to be the main liaison between MIT and IS.

=== US sanctions ===
On 22 March 2016, Santoso was subject to sanctions by the United States Department of the Treasury.

=== Manhunt ===
The Jakarta Post reported on 25 March 2016 that, "at least 2,500 military and National Police personnel have been on deployment since January, hunting for Santoso and around 34 of his followers".

On 23 June 2016, Muhamad Nasir, former leader of the Mantiqi III, called on Santoso to surrender. "Enough Santoso, get down here, it's better to turn yourself in, have a sympathy for your family. You have nothing to aim for", he said.

In January 2016, there was speculation that Santoso may have been killed after a photograph of a corpse was widely circulated. National Police spokesman Suharsono said the body was not that of Santoso.

== Death ==
On 23 July 2016, Indonesia national police said DNA testing had confirmed that the deceased body was that of Santoso. "From the DNA test results, it's positive and confirmed that one of the corpses is Santoso," said Brig. Gen. Boy Rafli Amar, a national police spokesman.

=== Funeral ===
Thousands of people, several of whom brandished Islamic State movement flags, attended his funeral. The mass turnout highlighted the extent of support for the Islamic State movement in Indonesia. A banner was erected across a small road leading to the house of Santoso's parents in Landangan village that read, "Welcome the martyr of Poso, Santoso alias Abu Wardah."

== Personal life ==
Santoso had two wives. The first one is Suriani, alias Umi Wardah. She lives in Kalora, Central Sulawesi. His second wife is from Bima. She is a widow of a dead Mujahidin member who was killed in a shootout with the Indonesian army.
