= Daeng Koro =

- Born: Sabar Subagyo; 15 January 1963; Bantul, Yogyakarta, Indonesia
- Died: 3 April 2015 (aged 52); Sakina Jaya mountains, Pangi, North Parigi, Parigi Moutong Regency
- Cause of death: Gunshot wounds
- Military career
- Allegiance: Indonesia (until 1992); East Indonesia Mujahideen (2012–2015)
- Branch: Indonesian Army; East Indonesia Mujahideen
- Service years: ?–2015

Sabar Subagyo (15 January 1963 – 3 April 2015), alias Jimmy or Autad Rawa, and more widely known by the name Daeng Koro, was an Indonesian Islamic militant and a core member of the East Indonesia Mujahideen (MIT).

Daeng Koro was a former member of the Indonesian Army (TNI-AD) who was dishonorably discharged in 1992 due to involvement in a sexual misconduct case. He became involved in terrorist activities in 2000 and joined Santoso in 2012 as the field commander of the East Indonesia Mujahideen (MIT). His military background and experience led the Indonesian National Police (Polri) to refer to him as "the most dangerous terrorist" besides Santoso. He was killed in a police ambush in April 2015.

== Personal life ==
Daeng Koro was born in early 1963 in Bantul, Special Region of Yogyakarta. He married and had three children—two sons and one daughter. When he became a soldier, he spent much of his time playing volleyball. This was because, although he failed to pass the commando selection, he managed to qualify for the volleyball team instead. He was said to possess jungle warfare skills as well as expertise in assembling explosives. The army stated that his commando background did not necessarily make him a dangerous figure.

== Career ==
In 1982, Daeng Koro joined the Indonesian Army's Special Forces Command (Kopassus), but he failed the commando training test. He was then assigned to the service division of the Headquarters Detachment (Denma) in Cijantung for four years. In 1985, Daeng Koro was transferred to the 3rd Infantry Brigade of the Army Strategic Reserve Command (Kostrad) and joined the 432nd Infantry Battalion based in Maros, South Sulawesi. In 1992, he was discharged after being caught having an affair with another soldier's wife in 1988. As a result, he was detained in a military detention cell for seven months. The verdict of his military tribunal later finalized the decision, and he was dishonorably discharged.

== Involvement in terrorism ==
=== Early activity ===
According to police records, Daeng Koro began to get involved in terrorist movements in 2012. However, the former head of the National Counter Terrorism Agency, Ansyaad Mbai, stated that Daeng Koro had already been participating in terrorist activities in Indonesia since 2000. At that time, he supported the Laskar Jihad militants during the Poso riots and also collaborated with the Poso branch of Jemaah Islamiyah (JI) to fight the police during the Tanah Runtuh incident in early 2007 in Poso. During that event, Daeng Koro escaped with his colleague to Makassar.

In 2003, he moved to Kalimantan and joined the Indonesian Islamic State group led by Haji Nurdin. From then on, he became involved in unrest across several regions in Indonesia, including shooting at the police and civilians. According to the police, Daeng Koro served as a trainer and lead organizer of several military training exercises (tadrib ‘askari) held in Tuturuga, Morowali Regency; Tamanjeka, Poso Regency; and Mambi, Mamasa Regency in West Sulawesi. He was also suspected of being involved in the unrest in Mambi in 2005. At that time, conflict arose between pro- and anti-territorial split groups in three districts of Aralle, Tabulahan, and Mambi in Mamasa Regency, regarding the establishment of a new autonomous regency. Daeng Koro's group was suspected of attacking the pro-territorial split faction.

In addition, around 2007, Daeng Koro was allegedly assisted in the escape of Jasmin, a convict sentenced to 20 years in prison for the Sampoddo café bombing in Palopo, from the Makassar Class I Penitentiary. Daeng Koro also maintained strong ties with Abu Umar, a member of Darul Islam. From 2010 to 2011, they held military training for their respective groups in West and South Sulawesi. Daeng Koro was also known for often providing weapons to Abu Umar for his group. These weapons were purchased from Mindanao in the southern Philippines and smuggled into Indonesia. This collaboration ended after Abu Umar and several of his members were arrested in July 2011. Daeng Koro once again managed to flee to Mindanao.

=== Joining Santoso ===
In 2012, Daeng Koro returned to Indonesia. Upon his arrival, he and his associates from the Makassar group immediately headed to Poso to join Santoso's band. His companions who also joined Santoso were experienced individuals, such as Abu Harun, an alumnus of Kashmir; Kholid and Abu Uswah, both alumni of Moro; Jodi, a former member of the Kompak Kayamanya Mujahideen; and several others. Zipo, an alumnus of the Poso military training and leader of the Bima terrorist group, also joined. This group called themselves the East Indonesia Mujahideen (MIT), with Santoso as the leader and Daeng Koro serving as both advisor and field commander. A series of police operations and arrests targeting their network prompted MIT to begin launching terror attacks. The arrest of Badri in Solo, the police shooting of Farhan Mujahid, Abu Umar's stepson, whom Koro considered him as his nephew, and the arrest of Sutarno, one of Daeng Koro's trusted aides, triggered retaliatory actions by the group.

On 11 November 2012, Daeng Koro's followers attempted to assassinate the Governor of South Sulawesi, Syahrul Yasin Limpo. One of his men, Awaludin, assisted by an accomplice, threw a bomb as the governor was about to give a speech during the Golkar Party's anniversary celebration. The police eventually arrested Awaludin, but the attacks continued.

Daeng Koro was also considered the mastermind of the murder of two Poso police officers, Andi Sappa and Sudirman, in Tamanjeka, Masani, in October 2012. The two officers were found dead in a one-meter-deep hole.

He was also suspected of planning the ambush and shooting Central Sulawesi Mobile Brigade forces in Kalora, North Coastal Poso, in December 2012. That incident resulted in the deaths of three Brimob officers. Later, Daeng Koro was also believed to have played a role as the bomb maker and executor of a bombing in Pantangolemba, South Coastal Poso, in February 2014. In June 2014, he was also accused of being involved in the shooting of a civilian in Tamanjeka, Masani, Coastal Poso District.

Furthermore, the Indonesian police (Polri) stated that he was involved in the procurement of weapons for MIT, served as a liaison between the MIT group and the Makassar network, and acted as a strategist in determining the group's direction and movements.

== Death ==
On April 3, 2015, Daeng Koro was killed in a shootout with the Detachment 88 in the Sakina Jaya mountains, Pangi, North Parigi, Parigi Moutong Regency. The incident began with a report from a local resident who saw six unidentified individuals near his plantation after Friday prayers. The resident then reported their presence to the Parigi Moutong Police. Detachment 88 launched a sweep operation and spotted around twelve unidentified individuals. The officers fired warning shots, which were met with a hail of gunfire from the group. The firefight lasted for about an hour, and MIT threw bombs towards the police. During the firefight, Daeng Koro was killed. From the operation, Detachment 88 seized two M-16 rifles, one homemade firearm, one pipe bomb, and hundreds of rounds of ammunition. They also confiscated two mobile phones and a GPS device at the scene.

From the confiscated mobile phones, police discovered a photo of Daeng Koro with his family holding rifles a black ISIS-style flag. The photo showed Daeng Koro along with his wife and their three children—each under ten years old—wearing masks. His body was then taken to Bhayangkara Hospital at the Central Sulawesi Regional Police Headquarters in Palu for DNA testing. According to the DNA test results released on 8 April 2015, the deceased body was confirmed to be Daeng Koro after the medical team collected blood, saliva, and hair samples from his wife and children for examination at the National Police Headquarters DNA Laboratory. Forum Islam al-Busyro, a media outlet affiliated with MIT, also released a statement confirming Daeng Koro's death.
