= Bekapai Park =

Coordinates: 1°16′36″S 116°50′2″E

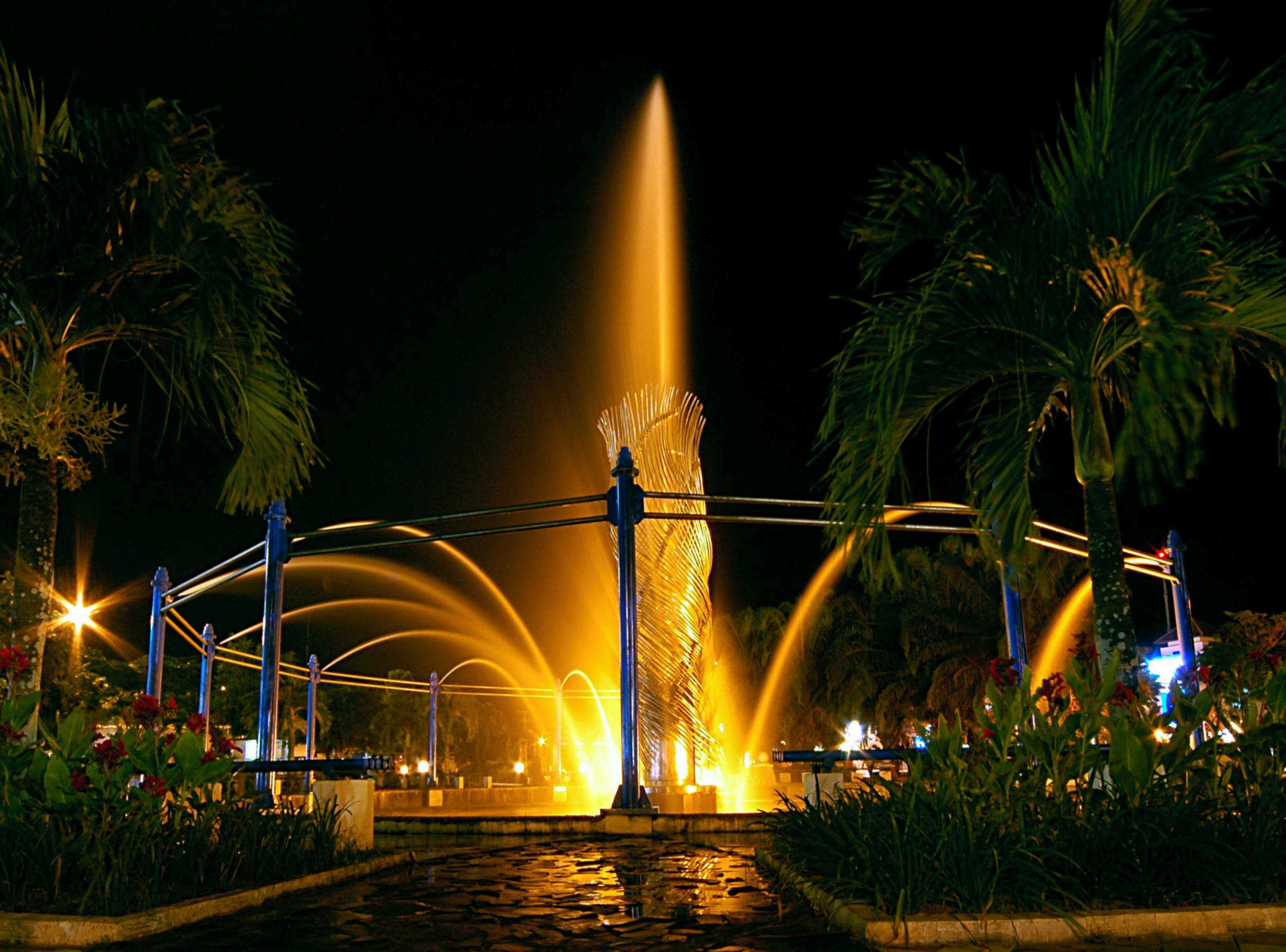
Fountain in the Bekapai Park.

Bekapai Park is a park situated in the city of Balikpapan, East Kalimantan. The park is located in the middle of the city, close to nearby shopping centers. There is a fountain made of stainless steel and a bronze sculpture in the middle of the park.
