= Andika Eka Putra =

Indonesian terrorist

Andika Eka Putra (died 14 September 2016) was an Indonesian Islamic militant and member of the militant group based in Poso, Mujahidin Indonesia Timur. He was on the most-wanted list (DPO) of the Indonesian Police, along with 44 (Note: 36 of them have been arrested, surrendered, or were killed.) other terrorists.

On September 14, Andika was found dead on the banks of the Puna in Tangkura village, South Poso Pesisir district, Poso regency, Central Sulawesi, at approximately 9:30 a.m. local time.

According to Central Sulawesi Police Chief, Brig. Gen. Rudy Sufahriadi, Andika died when he fell and his head struck a stone while he was crossing the river. A task force team was dispatched to retrieve the body and take it to Poso General Hospital.
