= East Indonesia Mujahideen =

Indonesian Islamist militant organization

- Mujahidin Indonesia Timur
- Emblem of the East Indonesia Mujahideen
- Leaders: Ali Kalora †; Abu Wardah (Santoso) †; Daeng Koro †; Muhammad Basri (POW)
- Dates active: 2010–2022
- Headquarters: Poso, Indonesia
- Active regions: Sulawesi
- Ideology: Islamism; Islamic fundamentalism Salafi Jihadism; Wahhabism
- Size: 41+ 18 (July 2016); 0 (29 September 2022)
- Part of: Islamic State
- Wars: Terrorism in Indonesia; East Indonesia Mujahideen insurgency; Operation Madago Raya
- Flag

The East Indonesia Mujahideen (Indonesian: Mujahidin Indonesia Timur; abbreviated MIT) was an Islamist militant group operating out of Poso, Central Sulawesi, Indonesia. The group was led by Abu Wardah (also known as Santoso) until he was killed by Indonesian police on 18 July 2016. After the death of Santoso, the group was led by Ali Kalora until he was killed on 18 September 2021. The group has pledged allegiance to the Islamic State.

MIT was proscribed by the United Nations Security Council under the Al-Qaeda Sanctions Committee on 29 September 2015. The U.S. Department of State has designated MIT as a terrorist organisation.

MIT has largely carried out its operations within Sulawesi but has threatened to attack targets across Indonesia. The group's operations have typically avoided operations that would cause civilian casualties, but was reportedly involved in clashes between Muslims and Christians in Maluku province between 1999 and 2002.

== History ==
The group was founded in 2010 by Santoso in Central Sulawesi area. The group was closely affiliated with West Indonesia Mujahideen that is led by Abu Roban. Abu Roban was later killed in 2013 during a police raid in Central Java.

In 2012, Santoso was chosen to be the leader of the group. Santoso was killed by Indonesian forces in 2016. His successor, Ali Kalora, was killed on 18 September 2021 alongside another militant by Indonesian security personnel in a forest near the village of Astina, located in the Parigi Moutong Regency of Central Sulawesi.

On 29 September 2022, the last member of East Indonesia Mujahideen was killed by Detachment 88. Even though all of its members have been killed or arrested, the Madago Raya operation will continue so that similar organizations are not formed again. As of 2023, the group is defunct.

== Actions and attacks ==
=== 2012 ===
The group gained their notoriety and fame after kidnapping, and later killing, two police officers in October 2012. Both police officers were kidnapped and then killed when they were scouting the area for probable terrorist activities. Both of the bodies were found by Indonesian Army search parties that were sent out after both officers were unable to be contacted. During the search operations, Santoso taunted Indonesian military and law enforcement to "fight him like a man" and to "stop looking good on television". The group was known to have prepared traps for Indonesian military search parties. Despite the action of the MIT and the death of the police officers, Indonesian search and rescue attempts were able to corner MIT multiple times.

On 24 October, the group attacked a police kiosk on Poso, Central Sulawesi, injuring four people; two police officers and two civilians.

=== 2014 ===
One of the perpetrators in the killing of the police officers in 2012 is arrested at Mamasa, West Sulawesi, by Densus 88. During the year, the group allegedly shot at a police station. The police also stated that MIT have participated in the abductions and killings of civilians, some of the killing is allegedly done because the civilian is acting as informant for the security forces.

=== 2015 ===
In 2015, the terrorist group conducted attacks on Christians, and were also involved in shootouts with Indonesian police. One Indonesian soldier and one police officer were killed during the year.

=== 2016 ===
One Indonesian police officer is killed by MIT during a shootout at Poso, while two of the terrorists are killed. Indonesian police stated that the terrorist group is operating on a difficult terrain at Pegunungan Biru. Indonesian police claimed that during their operation in 2016 28 members of the terrorist group has been arrested.

=== 2020 ===
After years of inactivity, the terrorist group struck again in November 2020, killing a Christian family, burning a Christian church, and also set fire to 6 homes. Days after the attack, Indonesian National Police claimed that during the year Detachment 88 have arrested 32 alleged terrorists from East Indonesia Mujahideen.

=== 2021 ===
On May 11, 2021, four farmers were killed by the group in the Napu Valley, Kalimango Village, East Lore Subdistrict, Poso District. The attack was said to be a revenge for the killing of two members of the group, including Santoso's son, two months prior.

== Foreign assistance ==
=== Uyghurs ===
Turkish passports were used by Uyghurs who were seeking to contact Mujahidin Indonesia Timor.

ISIS/ISIL aligned Uyghurs have been traveling to Indonesia to participate in terrorist attacks against Shia, Christians, and the Indonesian government, during a terrorist attack in Central Sulawesi, one Uighur, Farouk, was killed by Indonesian security personnel in November, and another Uighur terrorist, Alli, was arrested for plotting a terrorist attack. China has been contacted by the Indonesian government who sought assistance in confronting Uighur members of terrorist organizations in Indonesia. Indonesia arrested a possible suicide bomber named Ali, a Uyghur, on 24 December 2015.

In Sulawesi on Tuesday 15 March 2016 two pro-ISIS Uyghurs in Indonesia were liquidated by Indonesian government forces. The "Doğu Türkistan Bülteni Haber Ajansı" which supports the Turkistan Islamic Party (TIP), denounced the Indonesian government and police for their killing of 2 Uyghurs who were members of "Doğu Endonezya Mücahitleri" (Mujahidin Indonesia Timor). 2 Uyghurs with suspected terror ties were killed in Sulawesi by Indonesian security forces on 8 April and the killings were condemned by "Doğu Türkistan Bülteni Haber Ajansı". The "Doğu Türkistan Bülteni Haber Ajansı" criticised the Indonesian government for hunting down four Uyghurs who illegally entered the country to join "Doğu Endonezya Mücahitleri" and accused the Indonesian government of attacking Muslims. A Uighur accused of terror ties was killed in Sulawesi by the Indonesian security forces on 24 April, for which the "Doğu Türkistan Bülteni Haber Ajansı" condemned the Indonesian government.

In Poso Uyghurs were being instructed by Santoso, the head of Mujahideen Indonesia Timur. Faruq Magalasi, Mus'ab, Ibrohim, and Joko were the names obtained by the Indonesian media of Uyghurs being hunted by the Indonesian police.

In Poso four Uyghurs were captured by Indonesian police after they allegedly illegally entered Indonesia via Malaysia and Thailand with forged passports.

A total of 12 Uyghurs who joined the East Indonesia Mujahideen, six were killed and four were arrested in Sulawesi and two others were arrested in Bekasi and Batam respectively, all the arrested Uighurs were deported to China in 2021.

== Death of notable members ==
On 3 April 2015, Daeng Koro was killed by police. On 18 July 2016, Indonesian soldiers killed MIT leader Santoso during an operation. Sobron was also killed during the Tinombala Operation's Task Force on 19 September 2016. Leader Ali Kalora was killed alongside commander Jaka "Ikrima" Ramadhan on September 18, 2021.

Andika Eka Putra, one of the most wanted members of MIT, died on 14 September 2016. He was found dead on the banks of the Puna in Tangkura village, after accidentally falling while crossing a river, and dying of head injury after hitting a rock.

== All casualties of MIT members ==
As of September 29, 2022, the number of militants killed during the operation was of 51. Forty-five of those killed were East Indonesia Mujahideen members, while six were members of the Turkistan Islamic Party and the rest coming from other parts of Indonesia. At least 21 more were arrested.

- (Indonesia) Nae alias Galuh alias Mukhlas (from Bima) †
- (Indonesia) Askar alias Jaid alias Pak Guru (from Bima) †
- (Indonesia) Ali Ahmad alias Ali Kalora (from Poso) †
- (Indonesia) Qatar alias Farel alias Anas (from Bima) †
- (Indonesia) Jaka Ramadan alias Ikrima alias Rama (from Banten) †
- (Indonesia) Suhardin alias Hasan Pranata (from Poso) †
- (Indonesia) Santoso alias Abu Wardah (from Poso / Java) †
- (Indonesia) Sabar Subagyo aka Daeng Koro †
- (Indonesia) Basri alias Bagong (from Poso) – DT
- (Indonesia) Jumiatun Muslim (Santoso's wife from Bima) – M
- (Indonesia) Syarifudin Thalib alias Udin alias Usman (from Poso) – M
- (Indonesia) Firmansyah alias Thoriq alias Imam (from Poso) – M
- (Indonesia) Nurmi Usman (Basri's wife from Bima) – DT
- (Indonesia) Tini Susanti Kaduka (Ali Kalora's wife from Bima) – DT
- (Indonesia) Aditya alias Idad alias Kuasa (from Ambon) – DT
- (Indonesia) Basir alias Romzi (from Bima) †
- (Indonesia) Andi Muhammad alias Abdullah alias Abdurrahman Al Makasari (from Makassar) †
- (Indonesia) Alqindi Mutaqien alias Muaz (from Banten) †
- (Indonesia) Alhaji Kaliki alias Ibrohim (from Ambon) †
- (Indonesia) Firdaus alias Daus aka Baroque aka Rangga (from Bima) †
- (Indonesia) Kholid (from Poso) †
- (Indonesia) Ali alias Darwin Gobel (from Poso) †
- (Indonesia) Muis Fahron alias Abdullah (from Poso) †
- (Indonesia) Rajif Gandi Sabban alias Rajes (from Ambon) †
- (Indonesia) Suharyono Hiban aka Yono Sayur †
- (Indonesia) Word alias Ikrima (from Poso) †
- (Indonesia) Sucipto alias Cipto Ubaid (from Poso) †
- (Indonesia) Adji Pandu Suwotomo alias Sobron (from Java) †
- (Indonesia) Andika Eka Putra alias Hilal (from Poso) †
- (Indonesia) Yazid alias Taufik (from Java) †
- (Indonesia) Mukhtar alias Kahar (from Palu) †
- (Indonesia) Abu Urwah aka Bado aka Osama (from Poso) †
- (Indonesia) Mamat †
- (Indonesia) Nanto Bojel †
- (Indonesia) Can alias Fajar (from Bima) †
- (Indonesia) Sogir alias Yanto (from Bima) †
- (Indonesia) Herman alias David (from Bima) †
- (Indonesia) Busro alias Dan (from Bima) †
- (Indonesia) Fonda Amar Shalihin alias Dodo (from Java) †
- (Indonesia) Hamdra Tamil alias Papa Yusran (from Poso) †
- (Indonesia) Udin alias Rambo (from Malino) †
- (Indonesia) Germanto alias Rudi †
- (Indonesia) Anto alias Tiger †
- (Indonesia) Agus Suryanto Farhan alias Ayun †
- Ibrahim (originally Uighur) †
- Bahtusan Magalazi alias Farouk (originally Uighur) †
- Nurettin Gundoggdu alias Abd Malik (originally Uighur) †
- Sadik Torulmaz alias Abdul Aziz (originally Uighur) †
- Thuram Ismali alias Joko (originally Uighur) †
- Mustafa Genc alias Mus'ab (originally Uighur) †
- Ahmet Mahmud (originally Uighur) – DT (Deported to China)
- Altinci Bayyram (originally Uighur) – DT (Deported to China)
- Abdul Basit Tusser (originally Uighur) – DT (Deported to China)
- Ahmet Bozoglan (originally Uighur) – DT (Deported to China)
- Faris Abdullah (originally Uighur) – DT (Deported to China)
- Doni Sanjaya (originally Uighur) – DT (Deported to China)
- (Indonesia) Samil alias Nunung (from Poso) – DT
- (Indonesia) Salman alias Opik (from Bima) – M
- (Indonesia) Jumri alias Tamar (from Poso) – M
- (Indonesia) Ibadurahman (from Bima) – M
- (Indonesia) Syamsul (from Java) – M
- (Indonesia) Mochamad Sonhaji (from Java) – M
- (Indonesia) Irfan Maulana alias Akil (from Poso) – M
- (Indonesia) Taufik Bulaga alias Upik Lawanga (from Poso) – DT
- (Indonesia) Azis Arifin alias Azis (from Poso) †
- (Indonesia) Wahid alias Aan alias Bojes (from Poso) †
- (Indonesia) Muhammad Faisal alias Namnung alias Kobar (from Poso) †
- (Indonesia) Alvin alias Adam alias Mus'ab alias Alvin Anshori (from Banten) †
- (Indonesia) Khairul alias Irul alias Aslam (from Poso) †
- (Indonesia) Rukli (from Poso) †
- (Indonesia) Ahmad Gazali alias Ahmad Panjang (from Poso) †
- (Indonesia) Abu Alim alias Ambo (from Bima) †

== Possible Reform ==
Despite being militarily defeated declared to be defunct since 2022, remnants of MIT and its sympathizers still exist. On 19 December 2024, three MIT members arrested in Central Sulawesi and West Nusa Tenggara provinces. Police suspected there are still many MIT members out there, especially in Bima, where the group members mostly hailed.
