= Detachment 88 =

Indonesian anti-terrorism squad

Counterterrorism Special Detachment 88
- Detasemen Khusus 88 Antiteror
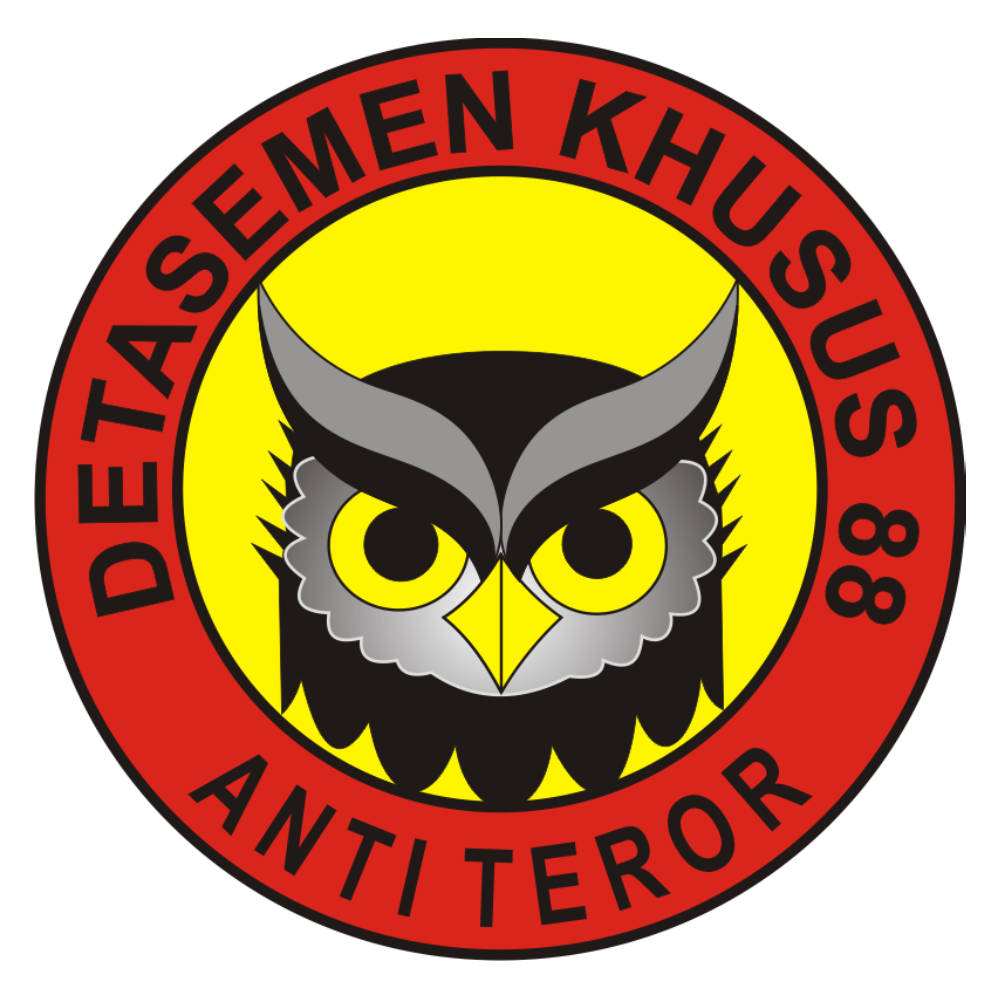
- The crest of the Detachment 88
- Active: 30 June 2003; 23 years ago
- Country: Indonesia
- Agency: Indonesian National Police
- Type: Police tactical unit
- Role: Counterterrorism
- Abbreviation: Delta 88; Densus 88

Structure
- Personnel: 1,300

Commanders
- Current commander: Police Inspector General Sentot Prasetyo, Chief of Detachment 88; Police Brigadier General Tubagus Ami Prindani, Deputy Chief of Detachment 88.

Notables
- Significant operation(s): Death of Azahari Husin; 2007 Poso Raid; Death of Noordin Mohammad Top; Arrest of Abu Dujana; Death of Dulmatin; Death of Abu Uswah; Death of Abu Roban; Cipayung Raid; South Maluku anti rebellion operation; 2016 Jakarta attacks; Operation Madago Raya; Death of Daeng Koro; 2018 Mako Brimob standoff; Death of Sunardi; Papua conflict; Anti Nazi and White supremacy operation

Counterterrorism Special Detachment 88 (Indonesian: Detasemen Khusus 88 Antiteror), or Densus 88, is an Indonesian National Police counter-terrorism squad formed on 30 June 2003, after the 2002 Bali bombings. It is funded, equipped, and trained by the United States through the Diplomatic Security Service's Antiterrorism Assistance Program and Australia.

The unit has worked with considerable success against the jihadi terrorist cells linked to Central Java–based Islamist movement Jemaah Islamiyah.

== History ==
Detachment 88 was formed after the 2002 Bali bombings and became operational in 2003.

The name of the organization is a result of a senior Indonesian police official mishearing "ATA" in a briefing on the Diplomatic Security Service's Antiterrorism Assistance Program as "eighty-eight (88)". He thought it would be a good name as the number 8 is a lucky number in Asia and other officials lacked the courage to correct him.

The bilateral initiative that started Detachment 88 also started Jakarta Centre for Law Enforcement Cooperation (JCLEC).

In July 2003, the first 30 Indonesian National Police officers were trained under to serve as the unit's first members under the Anti-Terrorism Assistance Initiative.

Detachment 88 has disrupted the activities of Central Java–based Islamist movement Jemaah Islamiyah (JI) and many of JI's top operatives have been arrested or killed.

Abu Dujana, suspected leader of JI's military wing and its possible emir, was apprehended on 9 June 2007.

Azahari Husin was shot and killed on 9 November 2005 at Batu, East Java. The Indonesian terrorist organization suffered a further blow when arguably its last surviving and at-large prominent figure, Noordin Mohammad Top was killed in a shootout with Detachment 88 on 17 September 2009 at Solo, Central Java.

Detachment 88 is assisted by foreign agencies, including the Australian Federal Police, in forensic sciences including DNA analysis, and communications monitoring. In pre-emptive strikes in Java, the unit thwarted attack plans to material assembly.

Detachment 88 operators were involved in an operation in Poso, where 10 people, including a policeman, were killed in a gunfight during a high-risk arrest operation on 22 January 2007.

At the beginning of 2010 Dulmatin began training a group of militants in the foothills of Jalin, just south of Banda Aceh in Indonesia in an attempt to build a 'nerve centre for Southeast Asian terrorism' under the name 'Al-Qaeda of the Verandah of Mecca.' The group was quickly wiped out, beginning with police raids on 22 February 2010, when many were killed or arrested, and followed up with intelligence from local people and ex-rebels who banded against the non-Acehnese militants. Dulmatin was killed in a police raid in Pamulang, South Tangerang on 9 March 2010 by Detachment 88.

On January 4, 2013, Densus 88 shot dead Abu Uswah the leader of Abu Uswah Network along with another suspected terrorist, Ahmad Khalil, in the courtyard of the Nurul Afiat Mosque at Wahidin Sudirohusodo Hospital, Makassar. In this incident, the police confiscated two firearms of the FN type and a mangosteen grenade.

On May 8, 2013, Detachment 88 conducted a raid in Babadan Village, Limpung, Batang District, Batang Regency. In this operation, Densus arrested two men named Puryanto and Iwan, while Abu Roban the leader of West Indonesia Mujahideen was shot dead. After the ambush, the Densus 88 team found one FN type pistol and six bullets, one revolver type pistol and three bullets.

On April 3, 2015, Daeng Koro was killed in a shootout with the Detachment 88 in the Sakina Jaya mountains, Pangi, North Parigi, Parigi Moutong Regency. The incident began with a report from a local resident who saw six unidentified individuals near his plantation after Friday prayers. The resident then reported their presence to the Parigi Moutong Police. Detachment 88 launched a sweep operation and spotted around twelve unidentified individuals. The officers fired warning shots, which were met with a hail of gunfire from the group. The firefight lasted for about an hour, and MIT threw bombs towards the police. During the firefight, Daeng Koro was killed.

Six members of a little-known terror cell called Katibah GR, or Cell GR, were arrested by D88 operators after carrying out a raid in Batam in August 2016. Police said their leader had been planning a rocket attack on Marina Bay, Singapore together with a Syrian-based Indonesian ISIS militant.

Throughout history, Detachment 88 has killed or captured more than half of the leaders or members of Islamic terrorist groups in counter-terrorism operations in Indonesia, During the first 13 years since its founding, detachment 88 has captured 850 terrorists and killed 54 terrorists.

During counter-terrorism operations against East Indonesia Mujahideen in Central Sulawesi, Detachment 88 and Indonesian security forces encountered foreign fighters, including individuals of Uyghur origin. Authorities reported that approximately 12 Uyghur militants entered Indonesia around 2011 as part of transnational jihadist networks and later joined MIT after failing to reach conflict zones in the Middle East. Security operations over subsequent years resulted in six Uyghur militants being killed during clashes, while the remaining six were captured and later deported to China in 2021 after completing legal processes. Efforts to deport the detainees were subject to legal challenges and objections from human rights advocates, who raised concerns regarding due process and the potential risks faced by the individuals upon return. Despite these objections, Indonesian authorities proceeded with the deportation in accordance with court rulings and existing immigration and counter-terrorism laws.

in 2023, Detachment 88 handled a case involving four Uzbek nationals suspected of involvement in international terrorist networks. While awaiting deportation at an immigration facility in Jakarta, three detainees escaped and attacked officers, resulting in the death of one immigration officer and injuries to others before they were recaptured. One suspect died because it drowned in the river, while the legal process for the remaining individuals continued in Indonesia, delaying deportation. As of the latest reports, the status of the remaining Uzbek-linked suspects and their final disposition remains unclear or undisclosed in public sources.

From the period of 2‒3 September 2024, Indonesian National police under Detachment 88, thwarted a plot by ISIS-linked terrorists to assassinate Pope Francis during his visit to Jakarta. Until 5 September, Detachment 88 initiated raids across various locations including Bangka Belitung, West Sumatra, West Java, and the vicinity of the Jakarta Metropolitan Area. Some were found with weapons such as bows and arrows, drones, and ISIS leaflets, even flags and logos. At the end of the operation, about 7 militants were arrested. The militants were reportedly angered by the Pope's visit to Jakarta's Istiqlal Mosque and the government's request for TV stations to temporarily to broadcast the Pope's visit for Catholic Indonesians over the Islamic call to prayer at Magrib during his visit.

In the mid-2020s, Detachment 88 expanded some of its counter-terrorism monitoring activities to include online extremist networks not linked to Islamist militancy. In 2025, the unit investigated a digital community spreading Neo-Nazi and white supremacist ideology among Indonesian youths. Indonesian police reported that 68 minors across 18 provinces had been exposed to the ideology through an online group known as the “True Crime Community” (TCC). Some participants were found to possess or have knowledge of weapons and were suspected of planning violent acts targeting schools and peers. Authorities stated that the case was handled primarily through early intervention measures, including counseling and coordination with local law-enforcement and social institutions, as part of broader efforts to prevent violent extremism and radicalization among minors. Police stated that 20 planned attacks by minors were thwarted through cyber patrols and early intervention by Detachment 88. Investigators also uncovered an online recruitment network involving five suspects attempting to radicalize up to 110 youths in 23 provinces.

== Preventing/Countering Violent Extremism ==
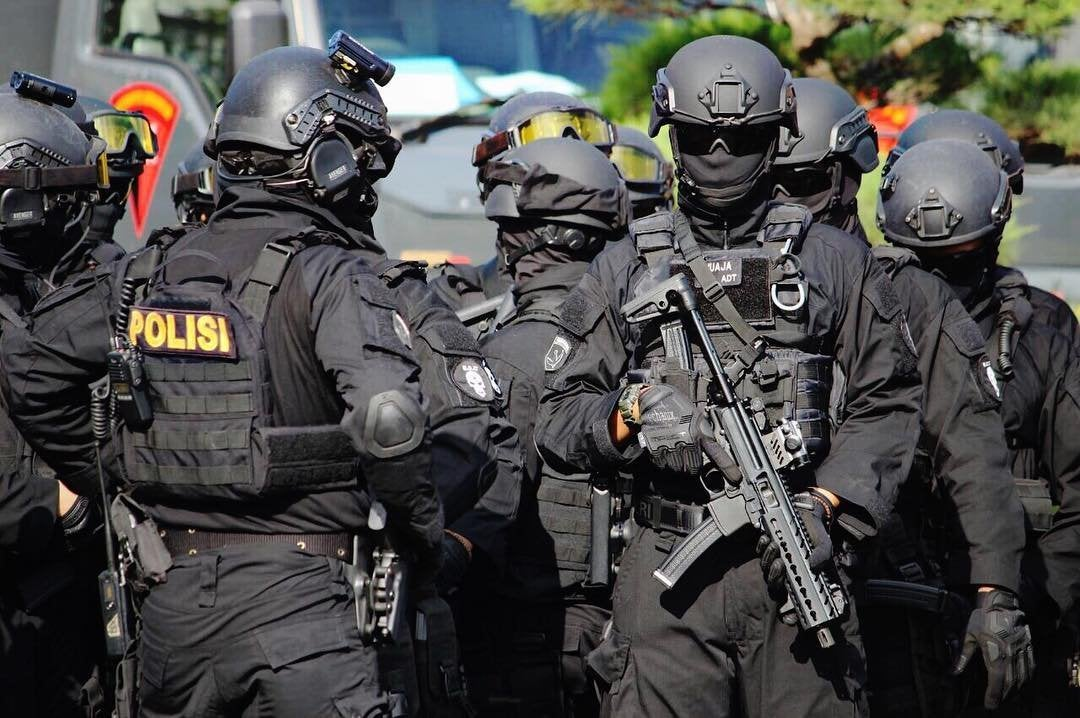
A Detachment 88 tactical team kitted out prior to an operation.

Preventing and Countering Violent Extremism (P/CVE) have been focal points of the Indonesian National Police and Detachment 88 since the 2002 attack in Bali. While the methods and strategies of Indonesia's P/CVE program have adapted over time from a law enforcement focus to a community based one, Detachment 88's investigators and P/CVE program continue to be integral in identifying militant personnel and attempting to reduce opportunities to exploit at risk persons and groups.

In 2016-2021, Indonesia adapted their P/CVE policies to create advocates within at-risk communities. Critical elements in this program have shifted from de-radicalization to building the public trust at the community level and raising awareness within at-risk communities on how recruiters are operating both in person and online, identifying militant recruiters, and working to rehabilitate those convicted of terrorism charges.

These efforts of the Indonesia National Police and Detachment 88 have received support from the United Nations Development Program (UNDP), Asia Development Bank (ADB), the International Office of Migration (UN/IOM), the United States and Australia. CVE efforts focus on universities, community leaders, community policing, reformation, and rehabilitation and transition programs.

Finally, Detachment 88's P/CVE efforts continue to adapt to address terrorist activity online. Detachment 88 continues to adapt its resources to combat cyber attacks, spread of propaganda, and recruitment efforts using the latest technologies, and cooperates closely with ASEAN and dozens of international partners.

== Training ==
This special unit is being funded by the US government through its State Department's Diplomatic Security Service (DSS), under the ATA. The unit is currently being trained in Megamendung, 50 km south of Jakarta, by the CIA, FBI, US Secret Service, and Australian Federal Police.

Most of these instructors were ex-US special forces and former law enforcement personnel. Training is also carried out with the aid of Australian Special Forces and various intelligence agencies.

Detachment 88 is designed to become an anti-terrorist unit that is capable of countering various terrorist threats, from bomb threats to hostage situations. This 400-personnel strong special force went fully operational in 2005. It consists of investigators, explosive experts, and an attack unit that includes snipers. As of 2017, the unit had 1,300 personnel assigned to it.

== Weapons ==
Detachment 88 officers were seen to have fielded the following firearms:

Model	Origin	Type	Reference
Glock 17	Austria	Semi-automatic pistol	
SIG MPX	United States	Submachine gun	
Heckler & Koch MP5	Germany	Submachine gun	
Heckler & Koch MP7	Germany	Submachine gun	
Remington 870	United States	Shotgun	
Ithaca 37	United States	Shotgun	
M4A1 carbine	United States	Assault rifle	
SIG MCX	United States	Assault rifle	
Steyr AUG	Austria	Assault rifle	
Heckler & Koch G36C	Germany	Assault rifle	
Heckler & Koch HK416	Germany	Assault rifle	
M14 rifle	United States	Battle rifle	
Remington 700	United States	Sniper rifle	
Armalite AR-10	United States	Sniper rifle	
Knight's Armament Company SR-25	United States	Sniper rifle	

== Allegations of torture and deaths in custody ==
The unit has been accused of involvement of torture.

In August 2010, Amnesty International said in an urgent appeal that Indonesia had arrested Moluccan activists, and they had anxiety that the activists would be tortured by Detachment 88.

In September 2010, the death of Malukan political prisoner Yusuf Sipakoly was allegedly caused by the gross human rights abuses by Detachment 88.

In March 2016, the Indonesian National Commission on Human Rights stated that at least 121 terror suspects had died in custody since 2007.

While acknowledging that Australia did train Detachment 88, Foreign affairs minister Bob Carr said in 2012 that he wasn't sure if the allegations were true, but would follow up.

== Future ==
The future of counter-terrorism in Indonesia is uncertain. With the disbandment of the Jemaah Islamiyah (JI) at the end of June 2024 key figures in the group have pledged their loyalty to the Indonesian government. In response the Indonesian government has issued pardons to many JI members. In January 2025, President Subianto announced budget cuts for several government offices including the National Counterterrorism Agency (BNPT), Detachment 88's collaborative partner. The BNPT handles deradicalization and rehabilitation while Detachment 88 handles law enforcement and counterterrorism operations. Without a fully funded BNPT terrorism in Indonesia may flare up again at an inopportune time with the military and law enforcement woefully unprepared for future attacks. There is a call for internal reviews and officer training to be conducted to increase the likelihood that militants can be captured alive in the future, so that they can provide the intelligence necessary to weed out terrorist networks.

Along with officer training and internal reviews, there is an effort to weed out corruption and keep an eye on prisoners so they do not radicalize other inmates. The path to revising anti-terrorism laws to allow counter-terrorism to respect basic human rights. Indonesia's top counter-terrorism chief Ansyaad Mbai caused an uproar in 2009 when he bemoaned that extremists converged to Jakarta because the nation's laws were lax compared to its neighbors Malaysia, which permit extended detention without trial. Critics worry adopting this approach risks undermining the democratic traditions of Indonesia, which is exactly what the terrorists aspire to in the first place.
