= List of terrorist incidents in 2005 =

This is a timeline of incidents in 2005 that have been labelled as "terrorism" and are not believed to have been carried out by a government or its forces (see state terrorism and state-sponsored terrorism).

== Guidelines ==
- To be included, entries must be notable (have a stand-alone article) and described by a consensus of reliable sources as "terrorism".
- List entries must comply with the guidelines outlined in the manual of style under MOS:TERRORIST.
- Casualty figures in this list are the total casualties of the incident including immediate casualties and later casualties (such as people who succumbed to their wounds long after the attacks occurred).
- Casualties listed are the victims. Perpetrator casualties are listed separately (e.g. x (+y) indicate that x victims and y perpetrators were killed/injured).
- Casualty totals may be underestimated or unavailable due to a lack of information. A figure with a plus (+) sign indicates that at least that many people have died (e.g. 10+ indicates that at least 10 people have died) – the actual toll could be considerably higher. A figure with a plus (+) sign may also indicate that over that number of people are victims.
- If casualty figures are 20 or more, they will be shown in **bold**. In addition, figures for casualties more than 50 will also be **underlined**.
- Incidents are limited to one per location per day. If multiple attacks occur in the same place on the same day, they will be merged into a single incident.
- In addition to the guidelines above, the table also includes the following categories:

0 people were killed/injured by the incident.
1–19 people were killed/injured by the incident.
20–49 people were killed/injured by the incident.
50–99 people were killed/injured by the incident.
100+ people were killed/injured by the incident.

== January ==
Total incidents: 2

| Date | Type | Deaths | Injuries | Location | Details | Perpetrators | Part of |
|---|---|---|---|---|---|---|---|
| January 13 | Car bombing, shooting | 6 (+3) | 5 | Karni crossing, Israel | Karni border crossing attack: Three Palestinian militants destroyed the border fence with a car bomb and crossed into Israeli territory, opening fire on civilians | Hamas; Al Aqsa Martyrs Brigades; Popular Resistance Committees | Second Intifada |
| January 15 | Raid, shootout | 4 (+6) | | Dagestan, Russia | January 2005 Dagestan Raids: Russian security forces raid two Islamist safehouses in Makhachkala and Kaspiysk, 4 commandos died in the raids as did six militants. | Shariat Jamaat | Second Chechen War |

== February ==
Total incidents: 3

| Date | Type | Deaths | Injuries | Location | Details | Perpetrators | Part of |
|---|---|---|---|---|---|---|---|
| February 14 | Bombing | 22 | | Beirut, Lebanon | Assassination of Rafic Hariri: Former Lebanese prime minister Rafic Hariri and 21 others after a massive bomb detonated near his motorcade. | Hezbollah (suspected) | Unknown |
| February 25 | Suicide bomber | 5 (+1) | 50+ | Tel Aviv, Israel | Stage Club bombing: A suicide bomber kills five Israelis and undermines a weeks-old truce between the two sides. | Islamic Jihad | Second Intifada |
| February 28 | Suicide car bombing | 127 (+1) | Hundreds | Hillah, Iraq | 2005 Al Hillah bombing: Suicide car bombing of a police recruiting station in Hillah | Islamist insurgents | Iraq War |

== March ==
Total incidents: 0

== April ==
Total incidents: 3

| Date | Type | Deaths | Injuries | Location | Details | Perpetrators | Part of |
|---|---|---|---|---|---|---|---|
| April 3 | Bomb | 2-5 | 66 | Thailand | 2005 Songkhla bombings: Two people killed (possibly five), 54 injured, by three explosions in Hat Yai -one at the airport, one at a hotel, and another at a department store. | PULO | South Thailand insurgency |
| April 7 | Suicide Bomber | 3 (+1) | 18 | Cairo, Egypt | April 2005 Cairo terrorist attacks: A suicide bomber detonated an explosive device on Sharia al-Moski. Three foreign tourists (two French and one American) were killed, and 11 Egyptians and seven other overseas visitors were injured. | Abdullah Azzam Brigades | |
| April 30 | Suicide bombing, shooting | 0 (+3) | 10 | Cairo, Egypt | April 2005 Cairo terrorist attacks: A man suspected of being involved in the 7 April attack committed a suicide bombing at a bus station while being pursued by police, injuring seven people. A few hours later, two women opened fire on a tourist bus, injuring three people before they committed suicide. | Abdullah Azzam Brigades | |

== May ==
Total incidents: 3

| Date | Type | Deaths | Injuries | Location | Details | Perpetrators | Part of |
|---|---|---|---|---|---|---|---|
| May 4 | Suicide bombing | 60 | 150 | Erbil, Iraq | 2005 Erbil bombing: A suicide bomber detonated near a police recruitment center. | Ansar al-Sunna | Iraq War |
| May 7 | Bombings | 11 | 162 | Yangon, Myanmar | May 2005 Yangon Bombings: Two supermarkets are bombed nearly simultaneously. | Karen National Union (suspected) | Internal conflict in Myanmar |
| May 28 | Bombings | 22 | 90 | Sulawesi, Indonesia | 2005 Tentena market bombings: Two bombs were detonated at an open air market frequented by Christians. | Jemaah Islamiyah | |

== June ==
Total Incidents: 0

== July ==
Total incidents: 10

| Date | Type | Deaths | Injuries | Location | Details | Perpetrators | Part of |
|---|---|---|---|---|---|---|---|
| July 1 | Bomb | 11 | 25 | Makhachkala, Russia | Makhachkala Rus bombing: Blast killed 10 soldiers and wounded 7. | Shariat Jamaat | Second Chechen War |
| July 5 | Shooting, grenade | 1 (+5) | 3 | Ayodhya, India | 2005 Ram Janmabhoomi attack: Five terrorists attacked the Ram temple before being killed by security forces. | Lashkar-e-Taiba | Ayodhya dispute |
| July 6 | Bombing | 38-53 | 71 | Badarmude, Nepal | Badarmude bus explosion: A bomb detonated near a bus while passing across a bridge, causing the bridge to collapse. | Communist Party of Nepal (suspected) | Nepalese Civil War |
| July 7 | Suicide bombing | 52 (+4) | 700+ | London, United Kingdom | 7 July 2005 London bombings: Four suicide bombers detonated bombs that were hidden in back packs, killing 52 people and injuring 700. Three were in tube trains and one on a number 30 bus, the incident happened a day after London was announced to be host of the 2012 Olympic Games. | Islamists | |
| July 12 | Suicide bombing | 5 (+1) | 90+ | Netanya, Israel | 12 July 2005 HaSharon Mall suicide bombing: Islamic Jihad takes responsibility for a suicide bombing which kills five people at a shopping mall. | Islamic Jihad | Second Intifada |
| July 16 | Bombing | 5 | 14 | Kuşadası, Turkey | 2005 Kuşadası minibus bombing: A bomb exploded on a minibus carrying people to a beach | PKK (suspected) | Kurdish–Turkish conflict |
| July 16 | Suicide bombing | 100 | 150 | Musayyib, Iraq | 2005 Musayyib bombing: A suicide bomber detonates in a crowded market. A gas truck was passing as the bomber detonated, which made the event even more disastrous. | Islamist insurgents | Iraq War |
| July 21 | Bombings | 0 | 1 | London, United Kingdom | 21 July 2005 London bombings: Four small explosions at three London Underground stations and on a bus, but only detonators of the bombs exploded and no major injuries occurred. A fifth bomber dumped his device without attempting to detonate. The attackers were attempting to recreate the successful bombings on London public transportation that occurred two weeks earlier. | Islamists | |
| July 23 | Bombings | 64-88 | 150 | Sharm el-Sheikh, Egypt | 2005 Sharm el-Sheikh bombings: A market and two hotels frequented by foreigners are bombed. The Egyptian government claimed 64 people were killed but local hospitals reported 88 deaths. | Abdullah Azzam Brigades | |
| July 28 | Bombing | 13 | 50 | Jaunpur, India | 2005 Jaunpur train bombing: An express train en route to Delhi is bombed near Jaunpur. The perpetrators were never caught but Islamic extremists are strongly suspected. | Islamic extremists (suspected) | |

== August ==
Total incidents: 2

| Date | Type | Deaths | Injuries | Location | Details | Perpetrators | Part of |
|---|---|---|---|---|---|---|---|
| August 17 | Bombings | 2 | 100+ | Across Bangladesh | 2005 Bangladesh bombings: Over 500 bombs exploded in over 300 cities and towns across 63 of Bangladesh's 64 districts. | Jamaat-ul-Mujahideen Bangladesh; HuJI | Internal conflict in Bangladesh |
| August 17 | Car bombings | 43 | 76 | Baghdad, Iraq | 17 August 2005 Baghdad bombings: Two car bombs detonated at a busy bus station. A third bomb detonated on a road that was being used to transport victims of the first blasts to the hospital | Islamist insurgents | Iraq War |

== September ==
Total incidents: 2

| Date | Type | Deaths | Injuries | Location | Details | Perpetrators | Part of |
|---|---|---|---|---|---|---|---|
| September 14 | Suicide bombings | 160 | 570 | Baghdad, Iraq | 14 September 2005 Baghdad bombings: More than a dozen bombs rip through Baghdad. The deadliest blast occurred in the mostly Shia district of Kadhimiya and targeted a crowd of laborers looking for work. | Al-Qaeda in Iraq | Iraq War |
| September 29 | Car bombings | 95 | 100+ | Balad, Iraq, Iraq | 2005 Balad bombings: Three near simultaneous car bombs explode at a market and outside a police station and a bank | Islamist insurgents | Iraq War |

== October ==
Total incidents: 7

| Date | Type | Deaths | Injuries | Location | Details | Perpetrators | Part of |
|---|---|---|---|---|---|---|---|
| October 1 | Bomb | 0 (+1) | 0 | Norman, Oklahoma, United States | 2005 University of Oklahoma bombing: Joel Henry Hinrichs III detonated a bomb near the packed football stadium at the University of Oklahoma, killing himself in the process. | Joel Henry Hinrichs III | |
| October 1 | Suicide car bombings | 20 (+3) | 100 | Bali, Indonesia | 2005 Bali bombings: Three suicide car bombings target a resort and Kuta town square, places popular with western tourists. | Jemaah Islamiyah | |
| October 7 | Shooting | 8 | 20 | Mong, Pakistan | 2005 Mong shootings: Three unknown men opened fire on an Ahmadiyya mosque. | Unknown | |
| October 13–14 | Raid | 49 (+89) | 115+ | Nalchik, Russia | 2005 Nalchik raid: Several hundred militants belonging to the Caucasian Front and Yarmuk Jamaat attack several targets across Nalchik, including several government buildings, police stations and the airport. In total, 142 people were killed in the attacks including at least 35 members of Russian security forces, at least 14 civilians and at least 89 militants. | Caucasian Front; Yarmuk Jamaat | Second Chechen War |
| October 26 | Suicide bomber | 7 (+1) | 55 | Hadera, Israel | Hadera Market bombing: A Palestinian suicide bomber detonates a bomb near a falafel stand that kills himself and six others. Twenty-six people were also wounded. | Islamic Jihad | Second Intifada |
| October 29 | Assault | 3 | 1 | Poso, Indonesia | 2005 Indonesian beheadings of Christian girls: In Central Sulawesi, four Christian schoolgirls aged 15 to 17 years on their way home from school were assaulted by six masked Muslim men who beheaded three of them, Theresia Morangke, Alfita Poliwo, and Yarni Sambue, with machetes and placed their severed heads in front of a church and a police station. The fourth girl, Noviana Malewa, survived but suffered serious machete wounds. The terrorists belong to the group Tanah Runtuh whose leader Hasanuddin confessed at his trial that the well-planned assault was inspired and financed by Guru Sanusi, a former Muslim rebel (Moro Islamic Liberation Front) from Mindanao. Central Jakarta District Court sentenced two of the killers to 14 years in prison and mastermind Hasanuddin to 20 years. | Islamists | |
| October 29 | Bombings | 62 | 210 | Delhi, India | 2005 Delhi bombings: Two markets and a bus are bombed in a span of about 30 minutes in Delhi. | Lashkar-e-Taiba | |

== November ==
Total incidents: 2

| Date | Type | Deaths | Injuries | Location | Details | Perpetrators | Part of |
|---|---|---|---|---|---|---|---|
| November 9 | Suicide bombings | 60 (+3) | 115+ | Amman, Jordan | 2005 Amman bombings: Three suicide bombings targeting hotels frequented by foreign diplomats. | Al-Qaeda in Iraq | |
| November 18 | Suicide car bombings | 74+ (+2) | 100+ | Khanaqin, Iraq | 2005 Khanaqin bombings: Two suicide car bombers detonate at two Shia mosques near Iranian border. | Islamist insurgents | Iraq War |

== December ==
Total incidents: 3

| Date | Type | Deaths | Injuries | Location | Details | Perpetrators | Part of |
|---|---|---|---|---|---|---|---|
| December 5 | Suicide bombing | 5 (+1) | 40+ | Netanya, Israel | 5 December 2005 HaSharon Mall suicide bombing: A suicide bomb attack kills at least five people. | Islamic Jihad | Second Intifada |
| December 28 | Shooting | 1 | 4 | Bangalore, India | 2005 Indian Institute of Science shooting: Two men stormed the Indian Institute of Science and opened fire, killing Munish Chander Puri, the Professor Emeritus of Mathematics at IIT Delhi and wounding four others. The perpetrators were never caught but are strongly suspected to be Islamic extremists. | Islamic extremists (suspected) | |
| December 31 | Bombing | 8 | 53 | Palu, Indonesia | 2005 Palu market bombing: A butcher's shop that was frequented by Christians and sold non-Halal food was bombed. | Jemaah Islamiyah | |

== See also ==
- List of non-state terrorist incidents
- List of Palestinian suicide attacks
- List of Palestinian rocket attacks on Israel, 2001–2006
