= S. Kabo =

Indonesian politician

S. Kabo (October 7, 1910 - June 26, 1982 (aged 71) in Watutau), was the fourth regent of Poso Regency, Central Sulawesi, Indonesia; who ruled from 1957 to 1959. He is the third regent who has no military background.

He graduated from Poso's Holland Inlandsche School and OSVIA in Makassar, South Sulawesi. In September 1945, S. Kabo appointed as Head of Government of Poso Regency. He died on June 26, 1982, in Wanga.
