= Mujahedeen KOMPAK =

Mujahedeen KOMPAK or KOMPAC is a Darul Islam organisation based in Indonesia's Sulawesi island. Formed in 1988 with the stated aim of helping victims of conflict and disaster, it has been linked to providing funding for terrorist organisations such as Jemaah Islamiyah as well as carrying out attacks on local Christian groups. The organisation has been accused of diverting relief funds received from mainstream Muslims in Australia and other countries to fund terrorist activities.

== Background of regional tension ==
KOMPAK, an acronym for Komite Aksi Penanggulangan Akibat Krisis or "the Crisis Management/Prevention Committee" is based in Central Sulawesi, a poor region midway between the Christian north and Muslim south.

The Sulawesi regency of Poso has experienced sectarian conflict of various levels since at least 1998, when it was claimed a Muslim was attacked by a drunken Christian. Following this random checks on public venues were performed by vigilante religious groups, destroying alcohol when it was found.

This escalated to violence in 1999, following another reported attack on a Muslim by a Christian at Lombogia bus terminal. Several churches in were burned, and many Christian residents moved to the predominantly Christian district of North Pamona.

In April 2000 "Christian youth leaders" came from outside Poso to assist students in a Catholic dormitory after they reported being threatened by Muslims. It was reported that dozens of armed Christians marched in the street, calling themselves the "Bat Paramilitary Troops." Many KOMPAK recruits have family members killed during the a May/June 2000 series of attacks on Muslims that followed this.

In December 2001 following hundreds of deaths, local leaders drew up a peace agreement, the Malino II Accord (signed in February 2002), leading to a large reduction in such violence.

== KOMPAK and Jemaah Islamiyah ==
KOMPAK formed as a splinter group of leaders from Jemaah Islamiyah (JI) who grew impatient with the perceived bureaucratic nature of that organisation. In contrast to JI’s focus on religious indoctrination, Mujahidin KOMPAK is focused on members being able to fight as quickly as possible, and its members train in militant camps in Mindanao and Afghanistan. It is seen as "leaner, meaner, and quicker."

Central to the creation of KOMPAK was to build the ability of local groups to campaign without external assistance. In this manner KOMPAK serves as a force multiplier, with locals trained and equipping to fight independently, but at the direction of external (JI or al-Qaeda) leadership when required.

While KOMPAK often functions as the local agent of JI, the leadership reflects differences over longer-term strategies on waging jihad as well as shorter-term impatience. Al-Qaeda’s 1998 fatwa regarding attacks on Western targets was taken up by followers of Riduan Isamuddin, including those involved in the 2002 Bali bombing and 2003 Marriott Hotel bombing. These high-profile events are seen by the majority of Indonesia jihadists as a mistake for the region, undermining the goal of building a fundamentalist state through religious conversion.

== Charitable donations ==
The major source of funding for South East Asian jihadist groups are donations. While some are from individuals who overtly support a group's extra-legal activities, charitable donations intended for disaster relief or for the building of mosques are also often diverted. For KOMPAK and Majelis Mujahideen Indonesia, these types of donations are the main source of funds, as there is very little accountability or audit trail.

In 2000, Muslim Aid Australia based in Lakemba, Australia raised $10,000 for earthquake appeal initiated by KOMPAK, and had sent half before KOMPAK refused to provide details on how the donation were to be used. Also in Sydney, the Dee Why mosque donated money to KOMPAK after being Visited by Abu Bakar Bashir in 1990, which Imam Zainal Arifin, the former head of the mosque, states was for the "poor and needy."

Part of the money was used KOMPAK in the production of videos that, according to the organisation’s deputy chairman, "document the events that took place." These show Jemaah Islamiah members in activities against local Christians, and were later used in JI recruitment drives, the KOMPAK logo still in place.

In 2003, Kuwaiti Omar al-Faruq was arrested by Indonesia authorities after serving as an intermediary for Al Qaeda and Jemaah Islamiah. During his interrogation, he stated that money from the Saudi charity Al Haramayn was given to the Jakarta branch and later diverted to KOMPAK. The next year, following the 2004 Indian Ocean earthquake, KOPMAC quickly moved into the Aceh region and called out for donations to support its efforts there.

== Activities ==
Although smaller in number and with less political clout then JI, KOMPAK's members willingness to engage in direct violence has made them a threat to the region's stability. In November 2001, two KOMPAK members of used a nail bomb in an attack on the Petra Church in North Jakarta during an evening service with over 400 worshippers present. Although the church’s windows were destroyed, there were no reported casualties. Two years later in August 2003, a local KOMPAK member died in his father’s home while constructing a bomb. In October of that same year, a series of attacks were staged in the Poso and Morowali districts and left thirteen dead, mostly Christian villagers. These attacks were the first serious breach of the existing peace accord and signaled a possible return to sectarian violence for the province.

In October 2005, KOMPAK made its highest profile single attack to date, in which three Christian schoolgirls were beheaded and another injured. The attacks were reported internationally, eventually drawing criticism from the Papacy in Rome. Large scale police presence was raised in the region in an attempt to stop revenge attacks escalating the violence.
