= Madale Beach =

Beach in Sulawesi, Indonesia

Coordinates: 1°21′16″S 120°49′16″E

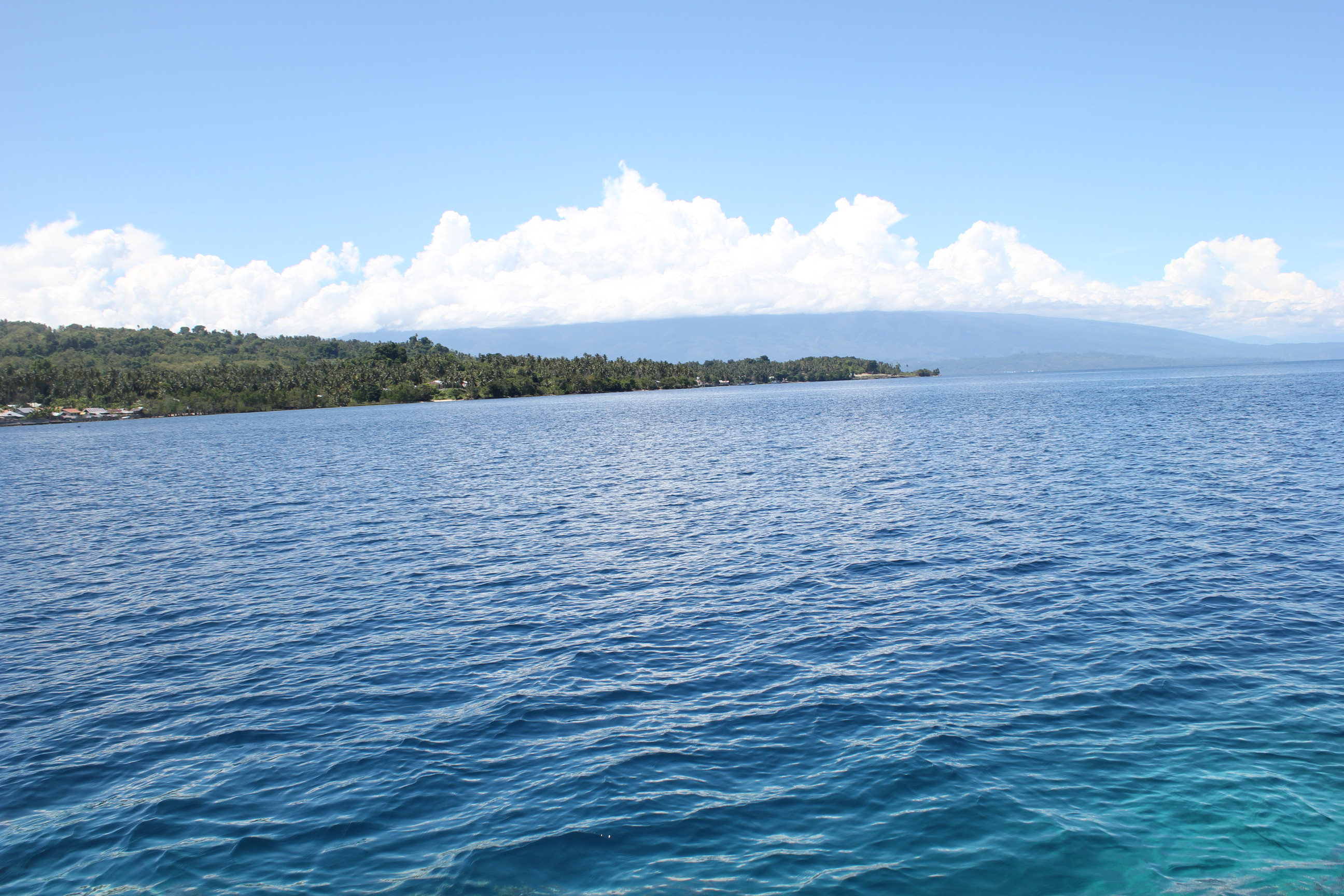
Madale Beach, 2014

Madale Beach (Indonesian: Pantai Madale), is a beach in Poso Regency, Central Sulawesi Province, Indonesia, about 5 kilometres (3.1 mi) northeast of Poso town. Surrounded by tropical and mangrove forest, the white sand beach is a notable snorkeling spot. Rumah Katu Marine Park is located here.

According to the Indonesian Ministry of Tourism, the waves in Madale is relatively quiet, so tourists can snorkel or dive without hesitation.

The largest and only coral reef on Sulawesi Island, located on Madale. With a depth exceeding 40 m, marine species such as sponge, giant crabs, and black-striped shark live here.

Destruction of coral reefs often occurs here. Fishermen's primitive methods to get results using fish bombs, eventually making the top of the coral wall being damaged.

== See also ==
- List of beaches in Central Sulawesi
