= Kasiguncu Airport =

Kasiguncu Airport Bandar Udara Kasiguncu
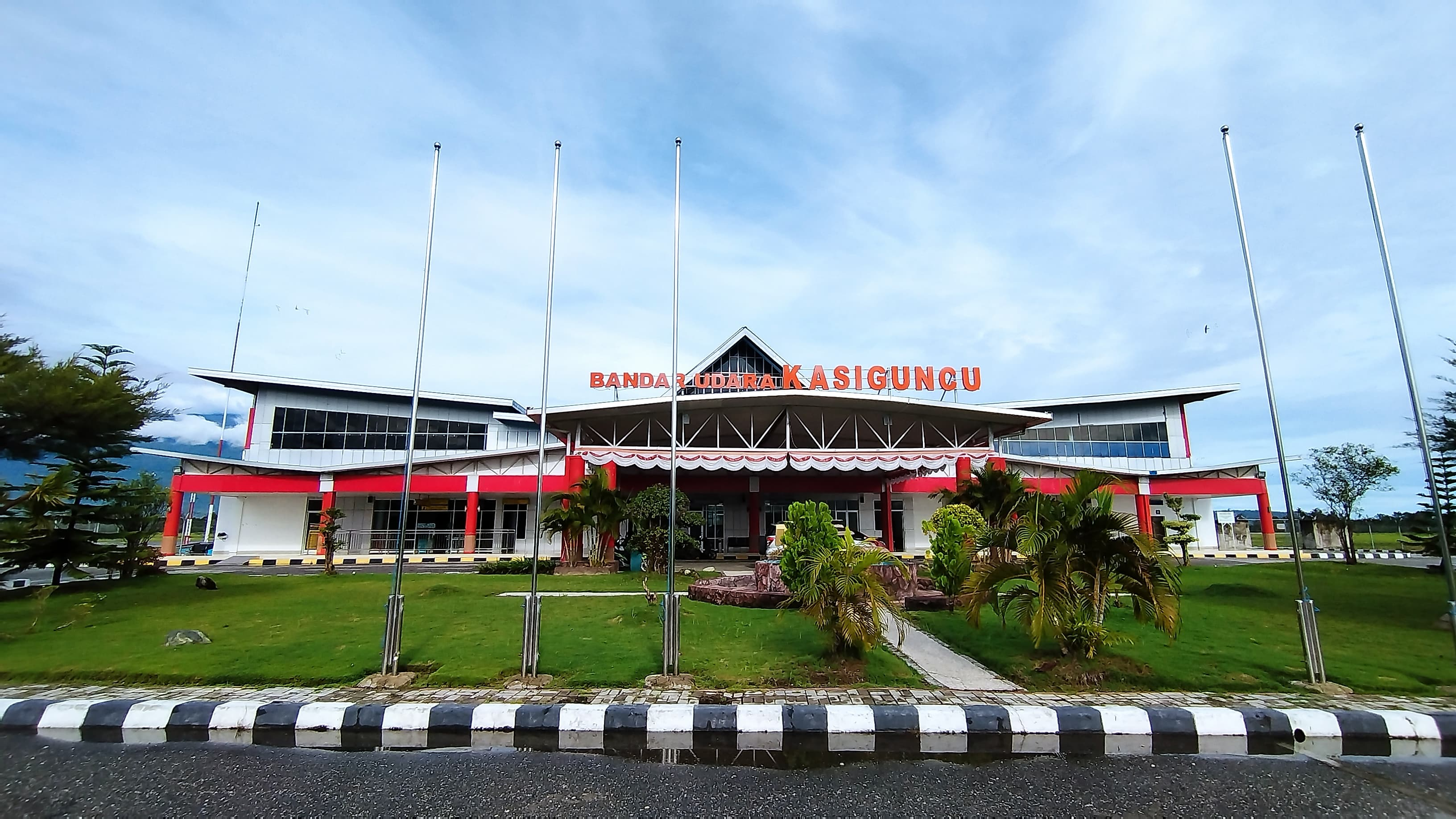
- IATA: PSJ; ICAO: WAFP

Summary
- Airport type: Public
- Owner: Government of Indonesia
- Operator: Directorate General of Civil Aviation
- Serves: Poso
- Location: Kasiguncu, Poso Regency, Central Sulawesi, Sulawesi Island, Indonesia
- Time zone: WITA (UTC+08:00)
- Elevation AMSL: 5.18 m (17.0 ft)
- Coordinates: 01°25′0.31″S 120°39′27.61″E

Map
- Location of the airport in Sulawesi

Runways
Direction	Length		Surface
Direction	m	ft	Surface
03/21	1,850	6,070	Asphalt

Statistics (2024)
- Passengers: 965 (▲1830.0%)
- Cargo (tonnes): 0.001
- Aircraft movements: 204 (▲3300.0%)
- Source: DGCA

Kasiguncu Airport (IATA: PSJ, ICAO: WAFP) is a domestic airport serving Poso, the administrative capital of Poso Regency in Central Sulawesi, Indonesia. The airport is named after the village in which it is located and lies about 11 km (6.8 miles) from the center of Poso. It serves as the main gateway to Poso and also as an alternative point of entry to the surrounding regencies, including Tojo Una-Una, North Morowali, and Morowali, which have a growing mining industry due to the region’s mineral resources. The airport currently operates only one route, to Palu, the capital of Central Sulawesi, served by Susi Air. In the past, the airport also served Makassar, the capital of South Sulawesi, with flights operated by Sriwijaya Air. Other airlines, including Wings Air and the now-defunct Merpati Nusantara Airlines, also previously operated flights to and from Poso.

== History ==
The airport began operations in 1974 and was inaugurated by Minister of Transportation Emil Salim. It was initially managed by the Poso Regency local government before being transferred to the Ministry of Transportation in 1979. During its peak period in the early 1980s, the airport served regular flights operated by Merpati Nusantara Airlines and Cessna aircraft. At that time, the airport was considered a lifeline for Poso due to the region’s limited land transportation infrastructure. However, as land transportation improved, particularly between Palu and Poso, regular flights gradually declined and the airport ceased operations in 1995. The airport's condition further deteriorated during the Poso conflict between 1998 and 2001. The conflict was one of the factors that left the airport abandoned until it was reopened several years later as conditions in the region improved.

After ten years of closure, the airport was reopened on 13 July 2005, primarily due to increasing demand and the growing movement of people from other parts of Sulawesi to Poso. Soon afterwards, Merpati Nusantara Airlines resumed the Makassar–Poso route before the airline ceased operations in 2014. The route was later taken over by Wings Air, which operated ATR 72 aircraft.

Between 2015 and 2016, the airport underwent a major renovation, during which a new, larger terminal was built and the runway was extended to 1,850 m to accommodate narrow-body aircraft. The renovation was completed and inaugurated by then President Joko Widodo on 19 October 2016, alongside the renovation of two other airports in Sulawesi: Miangas Airport in Miangas and Tanjung Api Airport in Ampana.

The airport was closed again between 2021 and 2024 due to declining traffic during the COVID-19 pandemic. Operations resumed in January 2024 when Susi Air launched a new Palu–Poso route. Wings Air resumed the Makassar–Poso route in March 2025 after it had been suspended in 2021, although it was closed again a few months later. The Makassar–Poso route resumed in September 2025, this time operated by Sriwijaya Air using a Boeing 737-500, marking the first time a Boeing 737 landed at the airport.

== Facilities and development ==
The airport has a runway measuring 1,850 m × 30 m, capable of accommodating aircraft up to the size of a Boeing 737. The runway was extended from its original 1,600 m × 24 m between 2015 and 2016 as part of a major renovation costing approximately Rp23 billion. Other infrastructure developments included the installation of a navigational system and the construction of a new ATC tower, which cost around Rp4–5 billion. An extension of the runway to 2,100 m was planned, with completion initially targeted for 2016, but the project has not yet been realized.

== Airlines and destinations ==
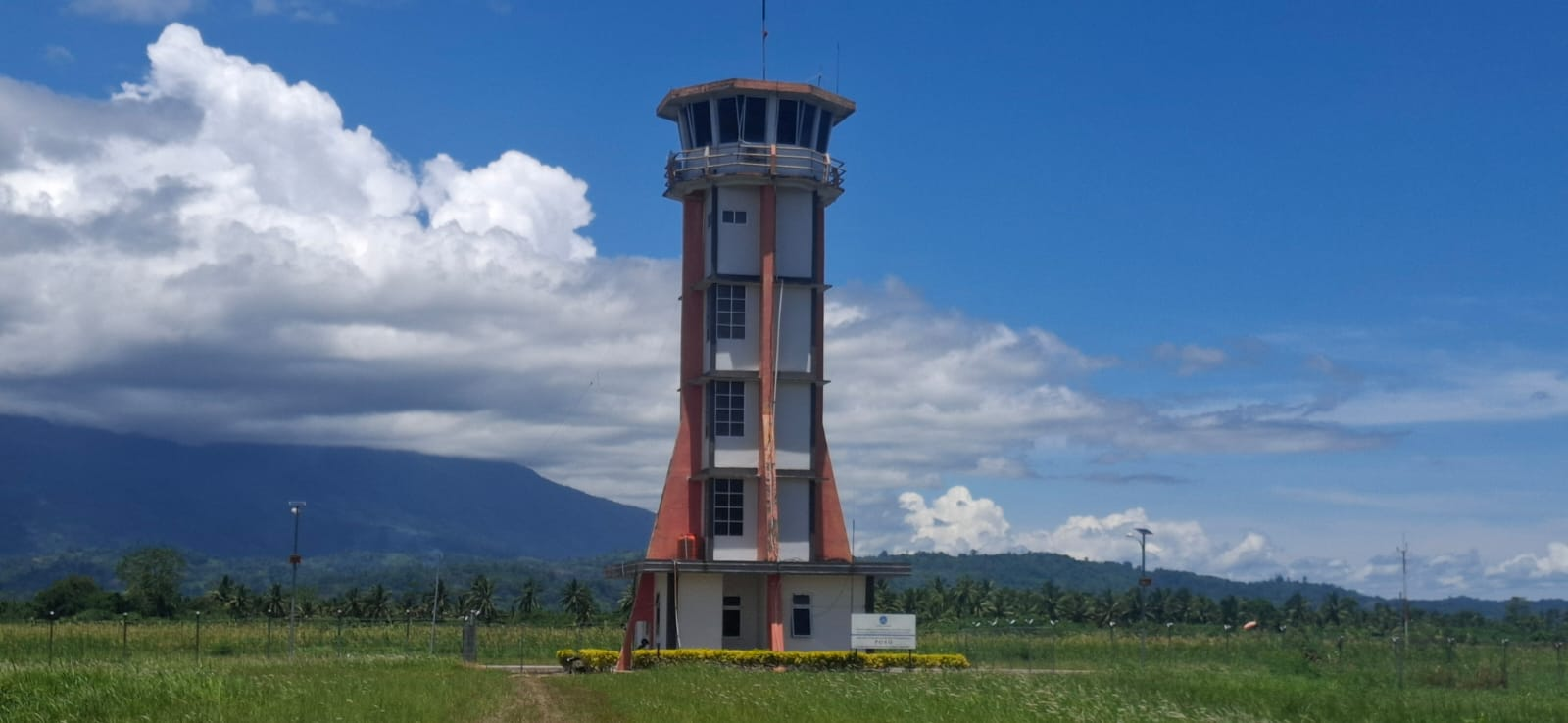
ATC tower

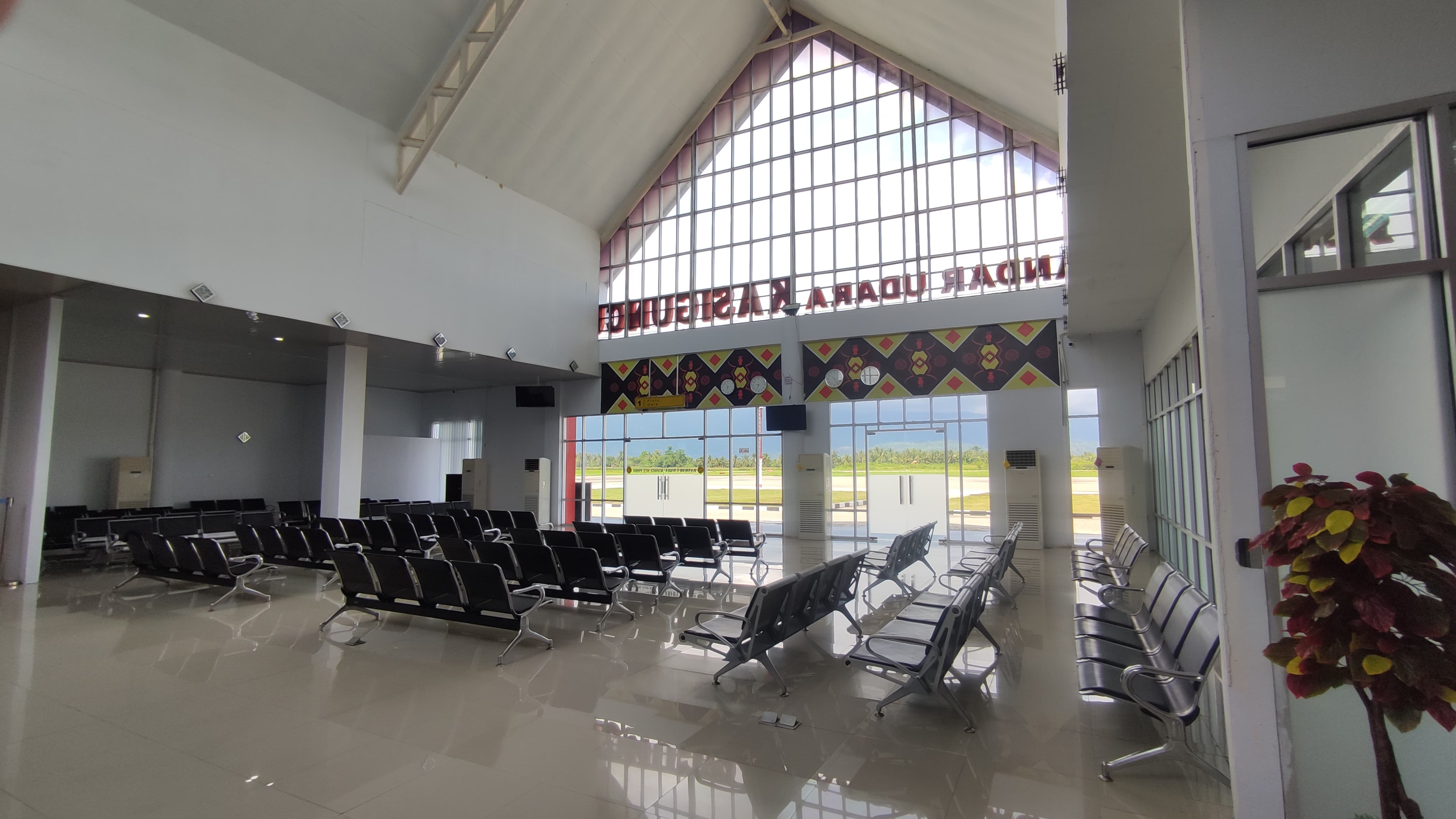
Boarding gate

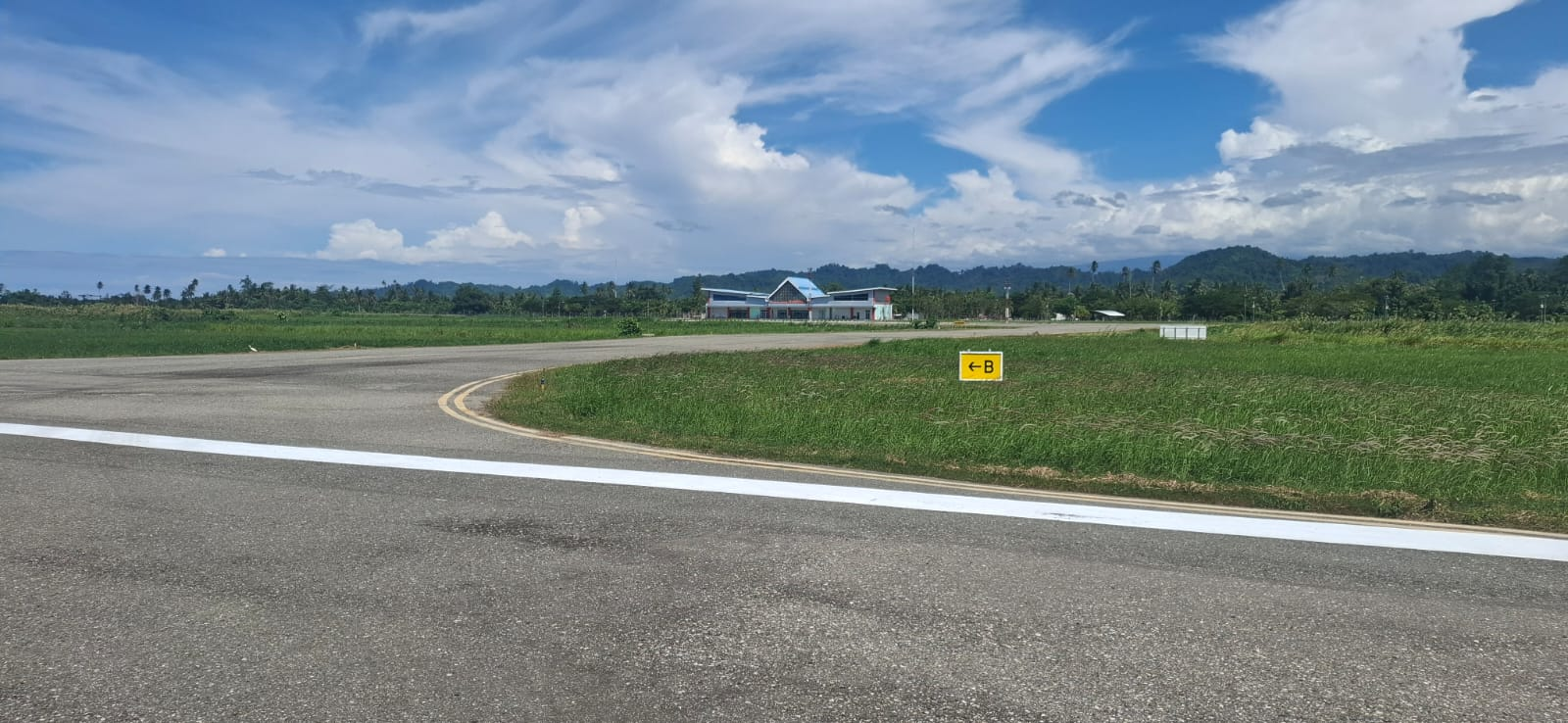
View of the apron from the runway

Airlines	Destinations
Susi Air	Palu

== Statistics ==
Annual passenger numbers and aircraft statistics
Year	Passengers handled	Passenger % change	Cargo (tonnes)	Cargo % change	Aircraft movements	Aircraft % change
2007	2,040	Steady	1.36	Steady	396	Steady
2008	402	▼80.29	0	▼100	94	▼76.26
2009	1,431	▲255.97	9.56	Steady	166	▲76.60
2010	4,629	▲223.48	0.08	▼99.15	481	▲189.76
2011	10,197	▲120.29	N/A	Steady	496	▲3.12
2012	20,166	▲97.76	N/A	Steady	562	▲13.31
2013	23,813	▲18.08	N/A	Steady	468	▼16.73
2014	17,167	▼27.91	N/A	Steady	552	▲17.95
2015	27,251	▲58.74	2.44	Steady	782	▲41.67
2016	36,770	▲34.93	10.33	▲323.68	852	▲8.95
2017	30,482	▼17.10	11.89	▲15.11	736	▼13.62
2018	26,426	▼13.31	13.23	▲11.30	722	▼1.90
2019	23,320	▼11.75	34.14	▲158.10	668	▼7.48
2020	5,551	▼76.20	6.71	▼80.34	250	▼62.57
2021	453	▼91.84	0.34	▼94.90	16	▼93.60
2022	74	▼83.66	N/A	Steady	6	▼62.50
2023	50	▼32.43	N/A	Steady	6	Steady
2024	965	▲1830.00	0.001	Steady	204	▲3300.00
^{Source: DGCA, BPS}
