= Malino I Declaration =

Malino I Declaration or Malino Declaration for Poso is a peace treaty initiated by the government of Indonesia on December 20, 2001, in Malino, Gowa Regency, South Sulawesi. This agreement brought together Christians and Muslims who fought in Poso in the communal conflict from 1998 to 2001, also known as the Poso riots. The meeting was chaired by the Coordinating Minister for People's Welfare at the time, Jusuf Kalla.

By agreeing on the clauses of the Malino Declaration, two commissions were established: the Commission on Security and Law Enforcement, and the Socio-Economic Commission. The Security Commission had two main responsibilities: firstly, within the field of security, focus on disarming and repatriation of the refugees; secondly, within the field of law enforcement.

The Socio-Economic Commission was tasked with ten programs: reconciliation, social rehabilitation, repatriation of the refugees, life insurance, physical rehabilitation, normalization of citizen economic activities, social support, development of parenting program, regular evaluation and monitoring, and program developments related to all of these. This program was administered by the Ministry of Social Affairs (Poso Social Service), with the exception of the reconciliation funds being controlled by the Poso Regional Government and the Malino Working Group 1.

The amount allocated by the central government to restore the condition of Poso Regency reached up to 54 million rupiah. The central government also implemented several programs for victims and refugees of the conflict. In addition, the Poso reconciliation program was also planned as the next step of the Malino Declaration.
