= Pasukan Manguni Makasiouw =

Indonesian traditional organization group

Manguni Makasiouw Troops
- Pasukan Manguni Makasiouw
- Other name: Manguni Brigade
- Founder: Decky Maengkom
- Leader: Lendy Wangke
- Dates active: 2000; 26 years ago
- Country: Indonesia
- Headquarters: Manado
- Active regions: Greater Minahasa (mainly)
- Ideology: Minahasan interests Christian nationalism Protestant Nationalism; Christian fundamentalism Islamophobia; Anti-Palestinianism
- Status: Active
- Size: <500
- Wars: Poso riots; Maluku sectarian conflict; 2023 Bitung clashes

Pasukan Manguni Makasiouw (lit. 'Manguni Makasiouw Troops'), also known as Brigade Manguni (lit. 'Manguni Brigade'), is an Indonesian Christian militia established in North Sulawesi. It was involved in the Poso riots, Maluku sectarian conflict, and the 2023 Bitung clashes.

== History ==
The Manguni Brigade was founded in the Minahasa region, North Sulawesi, in 2000, as a reaction to a possible invasion of an area with a predominantly Christian population by Islamist militia Laskar Jihad fighters. This is as a result of widespread religious conflict in the region around. As events developed, Laskar Jihad did not target North Sulawesi but crossed over to Poso in Central Sulawesi. The Muslim-Christian ratio is more balanced and tensions have increased. The militia was born after the fall of Soeharto along with other extreme groups. During the riots in Poso and the Maluku sectarian conflict, this militia also sent its members under the name "Black Bats Army".

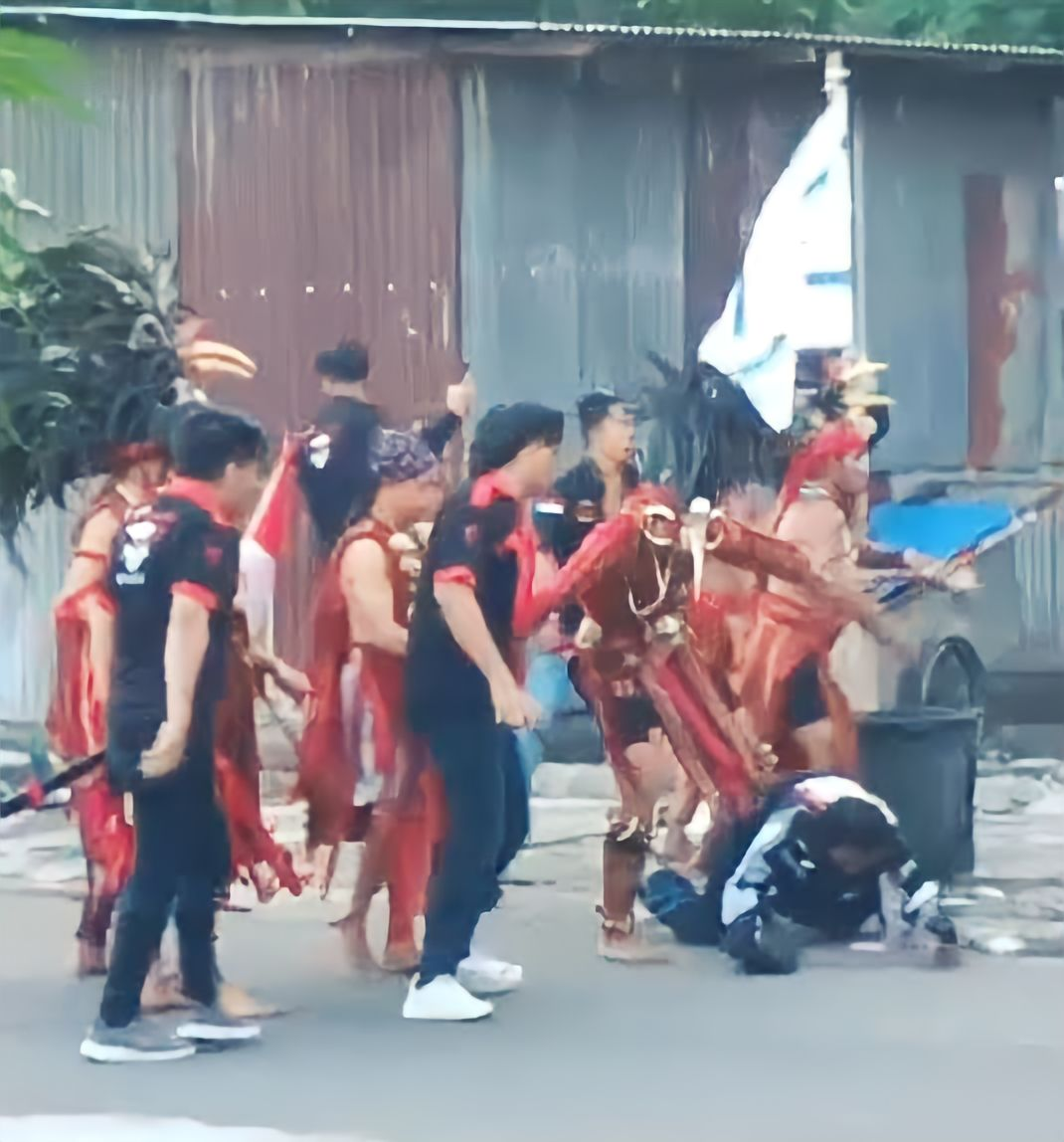
Pasukan Manguni Makasiouw assaulted a participant in a peaceful demonstration for Palestine during the Bitung clash, 25 November 2023.

In November 2023, the Manguni Brigade drew attention when its members attacked a pro-Palestinian supporter named Anto within the city of Bitung, North Sulawesi, which triggered a clash. During the incident, an ambulance was also attacked, resulting in its windows being smashed and the vehicle being overturned. The attackers tore and burned the Tawheed flag and the Palestinian flag. In retaliation, members of the Laskar Muslim Bitung and other Islamic organizations organized a sweep of the Pasukan Manguni Makasiouw posts.

== See also ==
- Minahasa people
- Christianity in Indonesia
- 2023 Bitung clashes
