= 2023 Bitung clashes =

Clashes during the Gaza war protests in Indonesia

- Part of the Gaza war protests
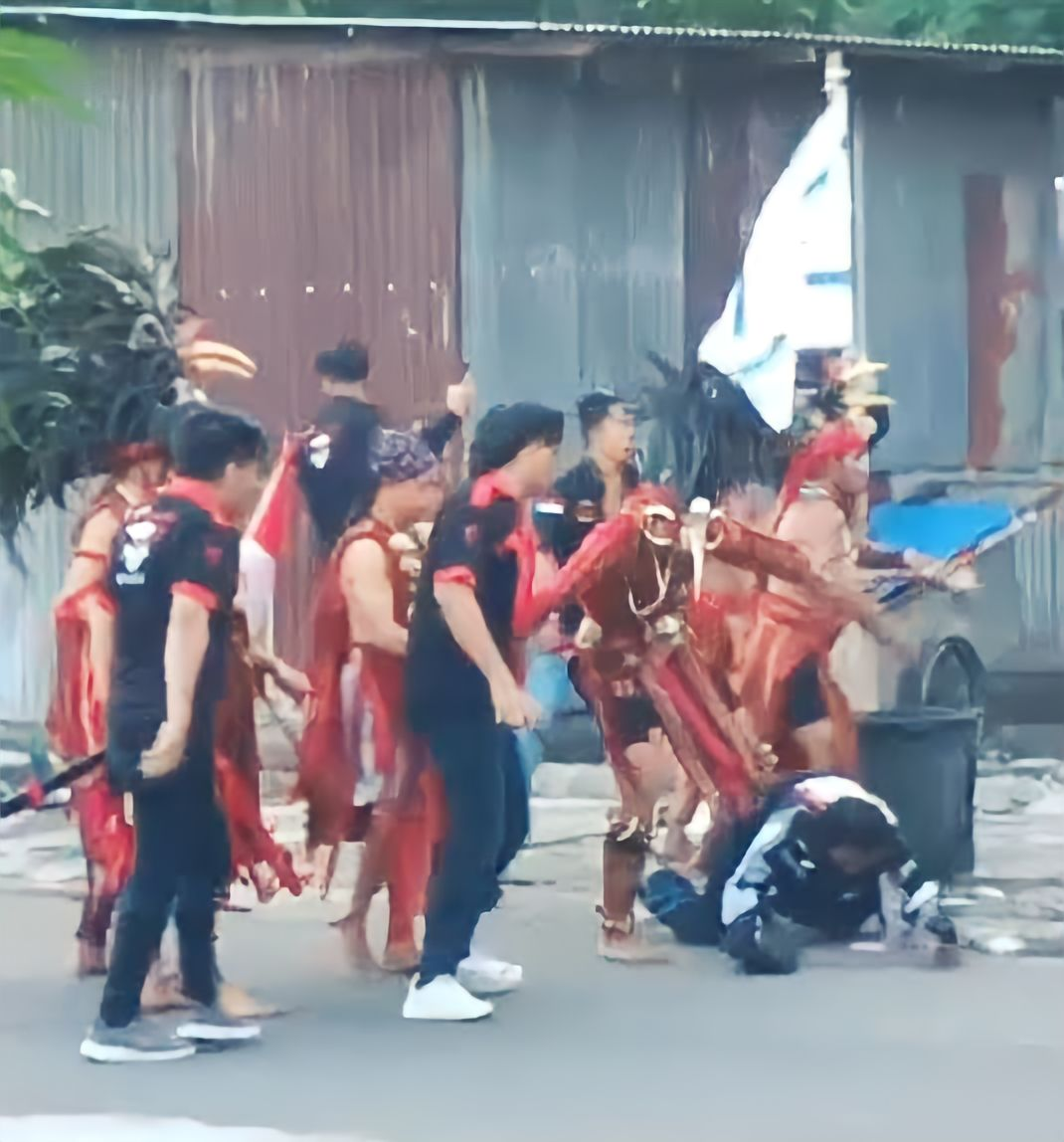
- Pasukan Manguni Makasiouw and Makatana Minahasa assaulted a participant of Aksi Bela Palestina.
- Date: 25 November 2023
- Location: Bitung, North Sulawesi, Indonesia
- Caused by: Provocative actions and attacks by Pasukan Manguni Makasiouw on pro-Palestinian crowd
- Methods: Assault, flag desecration, sectarian violence, vandalism
- Result: Peace agreement between the two parties

Parties
Pro-Palestinian crowd Muslim Solidarity Front; Islamic Brotherhood Front; Laskar Muslim Bitung; API Islam	Pro-Israel crowd Pasukan Manguni Makasiouw; Makatana Minahasa

Lead figures
Disorganized leadership	Michael Rempowatu

Casualties and losses
1 in critical condition	1 dead

On 25 November 2023 (UTC+8), in East Bitung Urban Village, Maesa District, Bitung City, North Sulawesi, Indonesia, a clash incident occurred involving two camps of mass organization. It is suspected that this clash was caused by an attack carried out by members of Pasukan Manguni Makasiouw and Makatana Minahasa against pro-Palestinian crowd from "Action to Defend Palestine" (Indonesian: Aksi Bela Palestina) demonstrations in the city.

== Background ==
Before the clash occurred, both organizations asked for permission from the Bitung City Resort Police for both events on 25 November 2023. Bitung Police chief, Tommy Souissa, later clarified during press conference on 26 November 2023, that both organization did not receive permission. North Sulawesi Police Chief, Setyo Budiyanto mentioned only the Adat group (Makatana and Manguni) received permission, however only from Bitung Kesbangpol and not the police.

Makatana and Manguni asked for permission from Kesbangpol Bitung on 7 November 2023 for the 12th anniversary of Makatana, the letter was received on 13 November 2023, and Kesbangpol gave permission for the event to be held on 25 November 2023. Barisan Solidaritas Muslim (Muslim Solidarity Front, BSM) asked for permission from Kesbangpol Bitung on 13 November 2023, the letter was received on 15 November 2023, for demonstrations for Palestine to be held on the same day 25 November 2023. Kesbangpol did not give permission and asked for the event to be advanced or postponed because of coinciding with the anniversary. According to Indonesian law No 9 Year 1998, coordinator for 'events for expressing opinions in public' only need to inform the police with a written notice at minimum 3 days before the event.

Before the clash occurred, there is a notification letter from Pasukan Manguni Makasiouw to Bitung City Police signed by Michael Rempowatu as chairman. In the notification letter, four demands were attached, with one unspecific demand. The first is that the police should not issue permits for the Palestine Solidarity Action in Bitung City on the grounds that it could cause security disturbances, "especially if carrying supporters of Hamas, which is a terrorist organization and the cause of Israel-Palestine war". Secondly, "to legally processed the coordinators of Aksi Bela Palestina demonstration on 25 October 2023 because carrying the poster, 'Stupid People Will Definitely Support Israel'". Thirdly "to finally process loudspeaker of the TPQ Aerujang located on Girian Permai District, because disturbing for neighbors, it's enough to use the loudspeakers for inside the building because, it is not a mosque and only center for learning Al-Quran". Apart from that, a threatening comment on Facebook is also suspected to be the cause of this clash. The account owner named Marco Karundeng, who is thought to be a member of Pasukan Manguni Makasiouw, posted a comment in Manado language which threatens to kill anyone who wears Muslim clothing such as kopiah and hijab.

This clash was also suspected of being a provocative action carried out by Pasukan Manguni Makasiouw and pro-Israel crowd who carried Israeli flags during the Aksi Bela Palestina demonstration. Until finally there was a clash in the afternoon between the pro-Palestinian crowd against Pasukan Manguni Makasiouw and the pro-Israel crowd in Bitung City.

== Chronologies ==
The clashes began during Aksi Bela Palestina demonstration initiated by the Muslim Solidarity Front at around 13.00 Central Indonesian Time, called for Palestinian independence and protested against Israel over the mass killings in the Gaza Strip. Then a group of people dressed in traditional clothes and armed with sharp weapons in the form of swords attacked the peaceful protest.

The Aksi Bela Palestina demonstration then turned unconducive. There was a victim from the pro-Palestinian crowd, namely Anto, who suffered abuse and was seriously and critically injured by Pasukan Manguni Makasiouw. One ambulance car was also damaged. The windows were smashed and the vehicle was overturned. Then the flag of Tawheed and flag of Palestine were also torn and burned by the attackers.

In response to the attack carried out by Pasukan Manguni Makasiouw in the afternoon, clashes occurred again at night on the streets of Bitung City center, a crowd consisting of the Laskar Muslim Bitung and other Islamic organizations gathered and conducted a sweep of the Pasukan Manguni Makasiouw posts. In this retaliatory action, 1 person from the Pasukan Manguni Makasiouw was killed by an arrow in the head. The victim is known as Elvis Wagey, 64 years old, a Minahasa traditional elder (tonaas) who comes from Watulambot Sub-district, West Tondano District, Minahasa Regency.

Then in the evening after the situation had returned to being conducive, representatives of the two mass groups stated that a peace agreement had been made in the Duasudara Stadium area. This agreement was initiated by the Bitung City Religious Harmony Forum and the Bitung City Inter-Religious Cooperation Agency. Before signing the peace agreement, the two representatives of these mass groups held a dialogue moderated by the Mayor of Bitung, Maurits Mantiri and the Bitung City Regional Leadership Coordination Forum as well as local religious leaders.

== Responses ==
Deputy Chairman of the Advisory Council of Indonesian Ulema Council, K.H. Muhyiddin Junaidi urge the police officials to investigate and take firm action against the perpetrators of violence in Bitung City, North Sulawesi. According to him, the perpetrators of the attacks who committed violence in Bitung must not be allowed to pass. Muhyiddin said, "The allowing of anti-Pancasila behavior by Zionist agents in Indonesian territory violates the national constitution which is very dangerous".

Mayor of Bitung City, Maurits Mantiri appealed to the residents of Bitung City to maintain conduciveness together and not be provoked by individuals who want division in Bitung City.

The Lampung Ulama and Activist Defense Team strongly condemns the attack carried out by a group of people acting in the name of Pasukan Manguni Makasiouw against the Aksi Bela Palestina protesters. According to the chairman of TPUA Lampung, Gunawan Pharrikesit, "This cannot be allowed in a democracy. The perpetrators can be included in the security disturbance movement group".

Islamic Brotherhood Front released a statement through its general chairman, Muhammad Al-Atthas. In this position statement, FPI fully supports the Aksi Bela Palestina demonstration for Palestine held in Bitung City because it is in line with Indonesia's foreign policy as well as legal and constitutional. FPI condemned the actions of the Pasukan Manguni Makasiouw in flying the Israeli flag because it was judged as a form of betrayal of the constitutional mandate and violates Minister of Foreign Affairs Regulation no. 3 of 2019 which prohibits the flying of "the Israeli Zionist flag". FPI also called for jihad against supporters of Zionism because they considered it to be contrary to Pancasila and had betrayed the mandate of Constitution of Indonesia. However, Indonesian Ministry of Foreign Affairs have clarified in the previous controversy relating to FIFA U-20 World Cup cancellation, the Minister of Foreign Affairs Regulation no. 3 of 2019 is only guidelines for regional governments in relations with foreign entities.

As a result of the clashes that occurred in Bitung City, API Islam South Sulawesi threatened to disband the post and secretariat of the Pasukan Manguni Makasiouw in Makassar City.

== Aftermath ==
As of 28 November 2023, Indonesian police have identified and arrested five suspects (with one being underage) from the Aksi Bela Palestina crowd in relation to the murder of Elvis Wagey in Sudirman Road. On the other hand, the police have also identified and arrested four suspects from the Minahasan organization group in relation to the serious harm done to Anto in Sari Kelapa District. On 2 December 2023, provocateur of the riot Marco Karundeng was arrested in East Kalimantan.

== See also ==
- Poso riots
