= 2002 Makassar bombing =

Terrorist attack in Makassar, Indonesia

A bomb exploded within a McDonald's restaurant in Makassar, Indonesia, on 5 December 2002. The McDonald's restaurant was located in the Ratu Indah shopping mall in Makassar. These bomb actions were conducted by the Islamic group “Laskar Jundullah”, which killed 3 people, including the bomber himself, and injured 15 others. The leader of the group, Agung Abdul Hamid, received a jail sentence of 18 years due to the planning and execution of both the bomb and the attack in Makassar. There is police confirmation that the Islamic group behind the McDonald's attack in Makassar was Laskar Jundullah Islamic Militia. Many of their beliefs and values reflect and stem from those of the 'Jamaah Islamiyah' Islamic Group.

== The bombings ==
The McDonald's bombing, on 5 December 2002, occurred on the evening of Eid al-Fitr festival, marking the end of Ramadan. The bombing killed 3 people and injured 15 others. Police say these 3 deaths included one of the bombers from the Islamic group Laskar Jundullah. The McDonald's bombings in Makassar was only one of the two to occur this day; another bombing took place at a car dealership, a few miles from the McDonald's. It was reported that no one was injured at this event, however the two events are closely linked through location and meaning.

These bombings, occurring in both the McDonald's store and the car dealership, are thought to have been motivated by the peace deal in Poso and support given by Indonesia's vice president, Jusuf Kalla. In the United Nations General Assembly, Kalla promoted the idea that peace "must be developed and nurtured through dialogue, inclusiveness, peaceful settlement of disputes, and non-use of force", which is believed to have been a potential driver in the actions of the Laskar Jundullah group. Kalla owned both the McDonald's store and the car dealership in Makassar. Another potential driver was to target a senior-level Indonesian politician.

== Suspects and sentencing ==
From these explosions, suspects Agung Abdul Hamid (36 years) and Munir Ansori (28 years) were questioned at Yogyakarta Police Station. From the South Sulawesi Regional Political Anti-Terror team, the arrests of these two suspects were led by the Adjunct Commissioner of Police Triatmojo, in which they asked 50 questions to both of the suspects. Agung Hamid was arrested on 3 October 2004 in Jalan Mangkubumi Yogyakarta, and Munir Ansori was arrested on the 27 September 2004, in Jalan Mageland, Blunyah Tegarejo. Both of the suspects were flown, using the Bouraq commercial aircraft, to Makassar from Aadi Sucipto Airport.

Prior to the arrest, Agung disguised himself as an onion trader moving from town to town, whilst Munir disguised himself as a used goods conveyor at Klithikan, a Yogyakarta traditional market. During the interrogation of both suspects, Police were able to collect information about the attack, gaining confirmation in their suspicions of Agung Hamid having a significant involvement in the 2002 McDonald's Bombings in the Ratu Indah Shopping mall. On 15 August 2005, several years after the bombings, Agung Hamid was trialed at the Makassar District Court, where the judges ruled that he was guilty and he was sentenced to life imprisonment.

Agung Hamid was not the only individual involved in the bombings in Makassar. Anton Bin Labbase and Ilham Riady were charged with the overall planning of the McDonald's bombings in Makassar, along with Agung. Ilham Riady received 8 years imprisonment for his involvement in the McDonald's bombings, which killed three people. Another individual, Galazi Bin Abdul Somad, a Muslim Militant, was heavily involved in the Makassar bombings through the role of transporting the explosives to the actual bombers. He received a sentence of 18 years due to these actions.

== Connection to Bali bombings ==
National Police detectives have indicated that there is a link between the Makassar and Bali bombings. Both of the attacks have been blamed on the Jamaah Islamiyah (JI) terror group and the police have revealed that some of the perpetrators knew each other and worked together. There have also been suspicions that both were targeted at major American and Australian symbols – McDonald's developing from the Western culture, and Bali being a strong Western tourist destination.

Furthermore, it is confirmed that the Bali Bombings occurred as a result of the actions from the Islamic group Jemaah Islamiyah. This further indicates the potential link between Makassar McDonald's bombings and the Bali Bombings, which both occurred in 2002, as Laskar Jundullah stemmed from the practices and beliefs of Jemaah Islamiyah. There are no official police statements stating these events link together, however.
