= Oklahoma bombing =

Oklahoma bombing may refer to:

- Oklahoma City bombing, in 1995
- 2005 University of Oklahoma bombing
