= Poso riots =

Religious conflicts in Indonesia

- Part of the post-Suharto era in Indonesia
- Map view front of Poso riots
- Date: 25 December 1998 – 20 December 2001
- Location: Poso Regency part of Morowali Regency
- Caused by: Brawl between Muslim and Christian youths
- Result: Malino I Declaration armed truce

Parties
| Muslim society in Poso; Laskar Jihad; Jemaah Islamiyah; Mujahedeen KOMPAK | Christian society in Poso; Pasukan Manguni Makasiouw; Laskar Kristus | Government of Indonesia Indonesian National Armed Forces; Indonesian National Police |

Lead figures
| Jafar Umar Thalib; Rizieq Shihab | Fabianus Tibo (executed); Dominggus da Silva (executed); Marinus Riwu (executed); Adven Lateka † | Abdurrahman Wahid; Wiranto; Roesmanhadi |

Casualties
- Deaths: 1,013–2,500
- Injuries: Thousands

The Poso riots, also known as the Poso communal conflict or Poso war, (Note: Indonesian: Kerusuhan Poso/Konflik komunal Poso/Perang Poso) is a name given to a series of riots that occurred in Poso, Central Sulawesi, Indonesia. This incident involved a group of Muslims and Christians in the region and was divided into three stages. The first Poso riot took place from 25 to 29 December 1998, the second from 17 to 21 April 2000, and the final one from 16 May to 15 June 2000.

On 20 December 2001, the Malino I Declaration was signed between the two conflicting parties, initiated by Jusuf Kalla, officially concluding the conflict.

== See also ==
- 2000 Walisongo school massacre
- 2002 Poso bus attacks
- 2004 Poso bus bombing
- 2005 Tentena market bombings
- 2005 Indonesian beheadings of Christian girls
