= Sintuwu Maroso Square =

Town square in Indonesia

Coordinates: 1°23′39″S 120°45′18″E

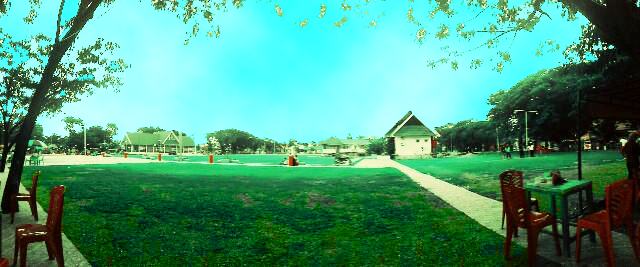
Sintuwu Maroso Square in Poso

Sintuwu Maroso Square (Indonesian: Alun-alun Sintuwu Maroso), is a town square located opposite the Regent's office complex, Kantor Bupati, in Poso, Indonesia. The square has been used for festivals such as the Indonesian Independence Day parade. The 300-meter four-cornered Sintuwu Maroso Square is bounded by Kantor Bupati, Parliament's office, Dharma Wanita building, and the infamous Poso's two lanes, which is often used as a street circuit for a motor racing national championship.

On June 27, 2014, members of the Democratic Party in Poso held their campaign to support the presidential candidate Joko Widodo and his running mate, Jusuf Kalla; despite the Democratic Party in Jakarta deciding to be a neutral party in the election.
