= 2005 Indonesian Christian girls beheadings =

Terrorist incident in Indonesia

On 30 October 2005, three Christian girls – Theresia Morangke (15), Alfita Poliwo (17), and Yarni Sambue (17) – were beheaded by Muslim jihadists in Poso, on the Indonesian island of Sulawesi, an area plagued by sectarian violence since 2001. The attackers planned the beheadings after visiting the Philippines. In 2006, three men were arrested and in 2007 convicted of the crime, one being sentenced to 20 years in prison and the others to 14 years.

== Background ==
Central Sulawesi experienced a lot of Muslim-Christian violence in the late 20th and early 21st century. The most serious violence, the Poso riots, occurred between 1998 and into 2000. Over 1,000 people were killed in riots, and tens of thousands were expelled from their homes. After a period of relative calm, hostilities were reignited by rumors that a Muslim girl had been raped by a Christian man. Thousands of Muslims and Christians were killed during the following year, and more than 60,000 families are reported to have fled their homes in the process.

The Malino peace accord was signed in 2001 and produced a dramatic decline in violence, but in the following years, tension and systematic attacks persisted. In 2003, 13 Christians were killed in the Poso District by unknown masked gunmen. In May 2005, a bombing in the nearby town of Tentena, killed 22 people and injured more than 30. Days after the killings, two 17-year-old schoolgirls were shot in the same area.

Christian community leaders have repeatedly criticized the authorities for allegedly not doing enough to find the perpetrators of attacks on Christians in Sulawesi.

== The attack ==
The three teenagers were walking to a private Christian school in Central Sulawesi province with their friend, Noviana Malewa, 15, when they were attacked by a group of six masked men armed with machetes. The attackers left one of the girls' heads outside a church. A note was left with the severed heads, which were dumped in plastic bags in the girls' village, which stated: "Wanted: 100 more heads, teenaged or adult, male or female; blood shall be answered with blood, soul with soul, head with head." Malewa, the youngest, survived the attack with serious wounds to her neck. The surviving girl was able to describe the attackers to the police.

Five suspects, including a former military police officer, were arrested and later released for lack of evidence, although three were subsequently re-arrested. The trial of three men, Irwanto Irano, Lilik Purwanto and Hasanuddin, began in November 2006. In February 2007, prosecutors recommended 20-year jail sentences for all three defendants. The prosecutors said they were not seeking the death penalty because the defendants had shown remorse and been forgiven by the victims' families. The sentences were passed on 21 March 2007. Hasanuddin was given 20 years for planning the attack, while two accomplices were given 14 years. Hasanuddin had told the court he helped plan the attack, but he denied allegations he masterminded it.

On going to jail, Hasanuddin said "It's not a problem (if I am being sentenced to prison) because this is a part of our struggle." Hasanuddin was the leader of the regional Islamic jihadist group Jemaah Islamiyah (JI) for the Poso district.
