= North Poso Kota =

North Poso Kota Poso Kota Utara
- District
- North Poso Kota highlighted in dark red
- Coordinates: 1°22′8″S 120°47′53″E
- Country: Indonesia
- Province: Central Sulawesi
- Regency: Poso Regency

Government
  - Camat: Fikri Mardjun

Area
  - Total: 20.22 km^{2} (7.81 sq mi)

Population (2020 Census)
  - Total: 12,930
  - Density: 639/km^{2} (1,660/sq mi)
- Postal code: 94615
- Area code: 72.02.22

North Poso Kota is a district in Poso Regency, Central Sulawesi, Indonesia. Along with the neighboring districts of Poso Kota and South Poso Kota, the district makes up the capital region of Poso Regency, Poso, covering 56.57 km^{2} with a population of 47,477 in 2020.

With a population of 12,930 inhabitants and a population density of 639 per km^{2}, North Poso Kota is the eight most populous and second most densely populated district in Poso Regency. With an area of 20.22 per km^{2}, North Poso Kota is one of the smallest districts, with only 0.28% of the total area of Poso Regency.

== Administrative division ==
As of 2020, Poso Kota Utara consists of seven administrative villages,

- Bonesompe
- Kasintuwu
- Lawanga
- Lawanga Tawongan
- Lombogia
- Madale
- Tegalrejo

== Sources ==
- BPS Poso (2016). Kabupaten Poso dalam Angka 2016 - Poso Regency in Figures 2016 (PDF) (in Indonesian). Central Bureau of Statistics of Poso Regency. Archived from the original (PDF) on 28 August 2016.
- BPS North Poso Kota (2016). "Kecamatan Poso Kota Utara dalam Angka 2016" [North Poso Kota Subdistrict in Figures 2016] (PDF) (in Indonesian). Badan Pusat Statistik Kabupaten Poso. Archived from the original (PDF) on 2016-09-20.
- BPS Poso (2017). Kecamatan Poso Kota Utara dalam Angka 2017 [North Poso Kota Subdistrict in Figures 2017] (in Indonesian). Badan Pusat Statistik Kabupaten Poso. ISBN 978-602-6543-20-2.
- BPS Poso (2024). Kecamatan Poso Kota Utara dalam Angka 2024 (in Indonesian). Badan Pusat Statistik Kabupaten Poso (published 26 September 2024).
