= Poso Kota =

- District
- Poso Kota highlighted in dark red
- Coordinates: 1°22′42″S 120°45′44″E
- Country: Indonesia
- Province: Central Sulawesi
- Regency: Poso Regency

Government
  - Camat: Sudarman Majid

Area
  - Total: 11.16 km^{2} (4.31 sq mi)

Population (2024)
  - Total: 24,025
  - Density: 2,153/km^{2} (5,576/sq mi)
- Postal code: 94619
- Area code: 72.02.01

Poso Kota is a district in Poso Regency, Central Sulawesi, Indonesia. Along with the neighboring districts of North Poso Kota (situated to the east of Poso Kota) and South Poso Kota, it makes up the capital region of Poso Regency, Poso, which covers a combined area of 56.57 km^{2} (21.84 square miles) with a population of 47,592 in mid 2024.

With a population of 24,025 inhabitants, and a population density of 2,153 per km^{2} in 2024, Poso Kota is the most densely populated and most populous district in Poso Regency. With an area of only 11.16 km^{2} (4.31 square miles), Poso Kota is also the smallest district in the regency, with only 0.16% of the total area of Poso Regency.

== Administrative division ==
As of mid 2024, Poso Kota District consisted of seven administrative villages (kelurahan), listed below with their populations.

- Gebangrejo (4,774)
- Gebangrejo Barat (2,594)
- Gebangrejo Timur (3,114)
- Kayamanya (5,449)
- Kayamanya Sentral (3,067)
- Moengko (3,351)
- Moengko Baru (1,676)

== Sources ==
- BPS Poso (2016). Kecamatan Poso Kota dalam Angka 2016 [Poso Kota District in Figures 2016] (in Indonesian). Statistics Office of Poso Regency.
- BPS Poso (2017). Kecamatan Poso Kota dalam Angka 2017 [Poso Kota District in Figures 2017] (in Indonesian). Statistics Office of Poso Regency. ISBN 978-602-6543-20-2.
- BPS Poso (2024). Kecamatan Poso Kota dalam Angka 2024 [Poso Kota District in Figures 2024] (in Indonesian). Statistics Office of Poso Regency.
