= 2005 Tentena market bombings =

Terrorist attacks in Indonesia

- Location: Tentena, Central Sulawesi, Indonesia
- Date: 28 May 2005; 8:15 a.m. and 8:30 a.m (UTC+8)
- Target: Open air market in central Tentena township
- Attack type: Improvised explosive devices
- Deaths: 22
- Injuries: 90
- Perpetrator: Local Islamic militants with purported links to Jemaah Islamiyah

A market in the center of Tentena, Central Sulawesi, Indonesia was bombed on 28 May 2005. Two improvised explosive devices, set to explode 15 minutes apart, detonated during the morning, killing 22 and wounding at least 40 more. The fatalities included a Christian clergyman and a 3-year-old boy. Several Islamic militants were later charged and sentenced to jail terms in 2007 and 2010 for their roles in organizing the bombing, among other sectarian attacks in the Poso region.

The bomb blasts are linked to sectarian conflict between Muslims and Christians in Poso that killed at least 577 people and displaced another 86,000 during three-year period before a government-sponsored truce agreed in December 2001. Those convicted for crimes related to the attack spoke of seeking revenge for previous atrocities committed against the Muslim community within Poso and the bombings were carried out on the fifth anniversary of a massacre of at least 191 Muslims in Sintuwu Lemba village, Central Sulawesi.

== The explosions ==
The first device detonated at around 8:15 a.m. and witnesses observed many of the victims who had come to help those injured in the first blast were killed by the second, larger explosion that left a 3-foot-deep crater. The blasts flattened food stands and also damaged a bank, a Christian church and a police station in central Tentena town. The Poso district police chief announced another, unexploded bomb was later discovered outside a nearby church.

The Jakarta Post initially reported 27 people were killed in the attack, citing volunteers at the Tentena General Hospital, however casualty figures were revised down to 22. A dentist volunteering at the same clinic stated that a total of 57 residents had been treated for injury at the poorly equipped facility, describing that "many suffered wounds in their internal organs," and estimated around 20 locals had been seriously wounded.

A trial for a cleric convicted of financing the attack later heard four militants had split into two groups to plant the devices in the meat and produce section in the market of the predominantly Christian town. Ardin Djanatu and Amril Ngiode carried and planted one while accomplice Syaiful Anam planted another bomb nearby, in front of the market structure, and the timers for the two devices were set to detonate 15 minutes apart.

Ngiode described that the bombs had been assembled out of TNT and sulphur, with large pieces of iron added to create shrapnel. One weapon had been concealed in a cardboard box and transported to the market in a black plastic bag disguised with vegetables. Explained to the court also by Ngiode was that the initial target was actually a Catholic school adjacent to the Tentena market, but that during their survey the convicted terrorists found the market was more crowded.

== Investigation ==
Prior to the bombing, in January 2005, authorities had discovered 60 homemade bombs in an abandoned house in Poso and, earlier in May, the Indonesian police had arrested three Muslim extremists in Central Sulawesi for alleged involvement in another attack using similar devices.

As of June 2005, 13 suspects had been arrested as part of the investigation into the attacks, including an escaped convict arrested near Tentena shortly after the bombings and the head warden of the main jail in the Muslim town of Poso. Ten other suspects in the Tentena and other attacks were arrested in early 2007 also.

In 2007 Anam and Djanatu were convicted with planting the devices in Tentena and sentenced to 18 years and 14 years jail respectively while Ngiode received a 15-year sentence for assembling the bombs and other charges of possessing illegal weapons and assault. The militants sentenced were among 6 Muslim militants jailed for crimes against Christian residents around Poso since the 2001 Malino Peace Treaty including the beheading of three school girls. The alleged bomb designer, identified as Taufik Buraga by Ngiode, still remains at large.

In a 2010 trial in Jakarta, hard-line Islamic cleric Eko Budi Wardoyo was convicted and sentenced to 10 years jail for providing funding to the perpetrators to assemble the two bombs and was identified as the primary adviser behind the attack. At the cleric's trial, as witness, Ngiode gave testimony that Wardoyo “used to say that jihad meant paying back the Christians for what they had done to the Muslim communities in Poso,” and that he had been taught to pursue jihad almost exclusively by the cleric, describing the attack as having been motivated by revenge.
