= Malino, Indonesia =

Malino ᨆᨒᨗᨊᨚ Kota Malino
- Town
- Nickname: "City of Flower"
- Location within Sulawesi
- Coordinates: 5°14′56.2″S 119°51′24.0″E
- Country: Indonesia
- Province: South Sulawesi
- Regency: Gowa Regency
- Elevation: 1,000–1,700 m (3,300–5,600 ft)
- Time zone: UTC+8 (WITA)
  - Summer (DST): UTC+8 (not observed)

Malino (Makassar: ᨆᨒᨗᨊᨚ) is a small hill town in the Gowa district of South Sulawesi, 70 km from Makassar. It is a popular getaway famous for its tropical flowers.

Malino has mountains rich with limestone and pine. Various kinds of beautiful tropical plants grow and thrive in this fresh air city. Moreover, Malino also produces fruits and vegetables that grows in typical mountain slopes in Bawakaraeng. Most people of South Sulawesi still consider the mountains a sacred place and still practices local rituals there. Temperatures in Malino ranges from 10 °C to 26 °C. When it is the wet season the city is often foggy.

The journey from Makassar to this area takes about 2 hours. The Thousand Staircase Waterfall, Takapala Waterfall, Nittoh Tea Gardens and now Become Malino HighLand, Lembah Biru, Japanese Bunker Heritage, and Mount Bawakaraeng are the hallmarks of Malino. Souvenirs typical of this area are Passion fruits, glutinous lunkhead, Tenteng Malino, apples, wajik, etc. Malino is also a rice producing area for the region of South Sulawesi.

The town was the venue for the 1946 Malino Conference during the Indonesian National Revolution. The Malino I Declaration and Malino II Accord were also signed there in December 2001 and February 2002, respectively.

== History ==
Malino in Makassarese means windless. Before it was renamed Malino, locals called the village Lapparak which means flat. The city of Malino has come to be known and increasingly popular since the Dutch colonial era, especially after the Governor-General Caron in 1927 ruled in "Celebes on Onderhorighodon" and made Malino in 1927 as a resting place for government employees.

Malino in Tumannurunga era (1320), not including the royal gowa.diri of nine Kasuwiang, or more popularly called Kasuwiang Salapanga are coordinated by Pacallaya. Ninth Kasuwiang area is part of: Kasuwiang Tombolo, Likuang, Samata, Parang-parang, Data, Agang Je'ne, Bisei, Kalling, and Sero. Area which includes 9 kasuwiang remain intact since the first king of Gowa Tumanurunga 1320 until the king of Gowa V "Karapang ri Gowa" 1420-1445 "Abd Razak Daeng Patunru. After the reign of the king of Gowa VI Tunatangkalopi, there is an attempt to expand its territory, by conquering the surrounding area, Gowa Tallo will be the Twins Kingdom.

== Malino Conference ==
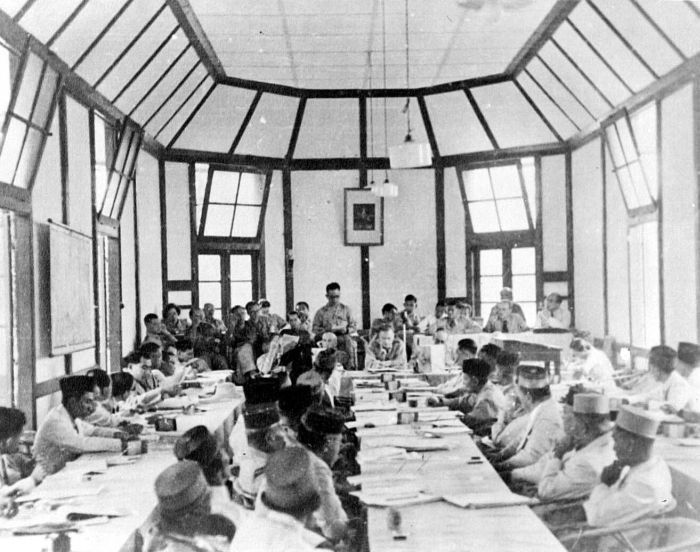

The Dutch organised a conference in Malino in July 1946 as part of their attempt to arrange a federal solution for Indonesia. From the end of World War II, Indonesian Republicans had been trying to secure Indonesian Independence from the Dutch colonial control. The Dutch invited thirty-nine Indonesian representatives of the local rulers (rajas), Christians, and several other ethnic groups of Kalimantan and East Indonesia who supported the idea of some form of continuing Dutch connection. However, the Dutch had not anticipated the level of support amongst the Indonesians for genuine autonomy. The conference resulted in plans for a state in Kalimantan and another for East Indonesia.
During the Malino Conference also Malino Scholarships were announced.

== Economy ==
Horticultural industry, industrial estates and agro industry has penetrated into this area, specifically in the area of Malino, Capital District Tinggimoncong is excellent tourism in South Selawesi. Areas that are above an altitude of 1,500 meters are also a major supplier of horticulture crops to Makassar and its surroundings, even the results of part of this plantation has been exported to several countries in Asia and Europe. All of these either directly or indirectly increase the income of the population, so that people will prosper, in addition to the migration to this area increased from year to year.
