= Rumah Katu Marine Park =

Marine water park in Poso, Indonesia

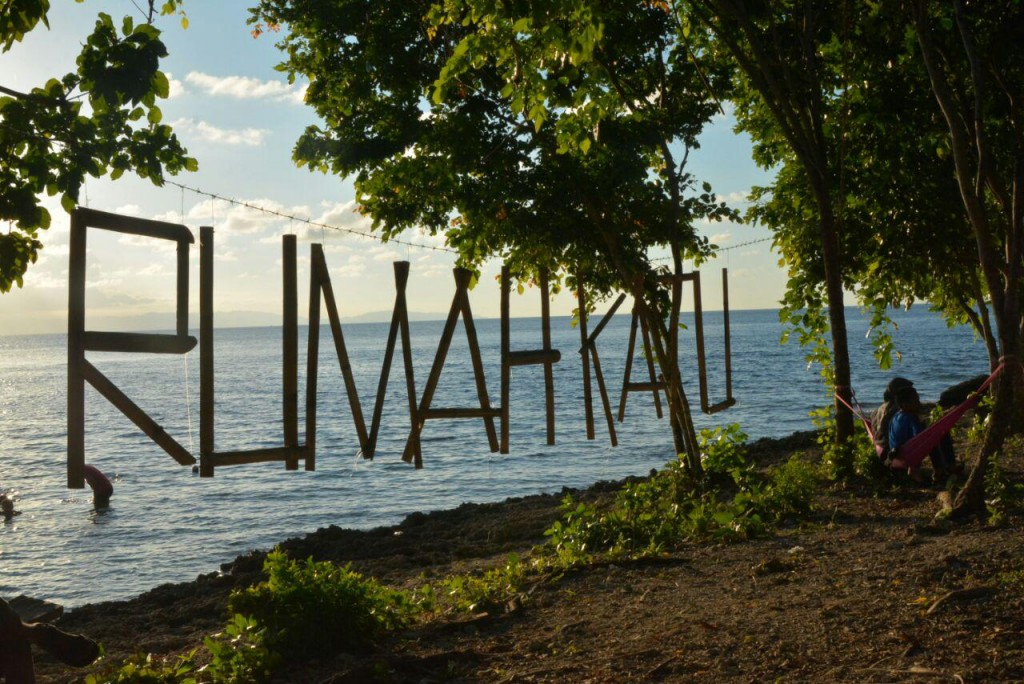
- Rumah Katu sign
- Location: Poso, Central Sulawesi, Indonesia
- Coordinates: 1°21′32″S 120°33′2″E
- Opened: January 2, 2016; 9 years ago
- Owner: Rumah Katu Community

Rumah Katu Marine Park (Indonesian: Taman Laut Rumah Katu), is a marine water park (Note: Although referred to as a marine park, this park is actually a water park. Called the marine park, because it is directly adjacent to the sea.) situated in the city of Poso, Central Sulawesi, Indonesia. The park is located in Madale Beach, about 10 km from the center of Poso.

In Rumah Katu, outbound games like banana boat and flying fox is available. Travellers generally come to visit for diving, fishing, snorkeling, or merely come to rest and relax with family.

On 19 to 20 August 2016, Rumah Katu Marine Park host one of the largest marine festival in Poso, called Rumah Katu Festival, with performances featuring music, dance, poetry, art and photo exhibition depicting the culture of Poso.

Rumah Katu Community who manage this park, is actively involved in campaigning for peace in Poso, which has been involved in communal conflict from 1998 to 2002. They consider this festival can convince the tourists to not hesitate to enjoy the natural beauty of Poso.

Poso District Government strongly supports this festival, which is marked with the support and presence of Poso Regent, Darmin Sigilipu.
