= 2002 Poso bus attacks =

Terrorist incidents in Indonesia

- Location: Central Sulawesi, Indonesia: Toini village, Poso Pesisir district.; Kawua and Ranononue, Poso district.; Mayoa village, South Pamona subdistrict.
- Date: 1st – 5 June 2002; 2nd – 12 July 2002; 3rd – 8 August 2002
- Target: Passenger buses
- Attack type: Terrorist attack
- Weapons: Improvised explosive device; Small arms
- Deaths: 7 fatalities: 1st – 5; 2nd – 1; 3rd – 1 (Lorenzo Taddey)
- Injuries: 26 injuries: 1st – 17; 2nd – 5; 3rd – 4
- Perpetrator: Suspected local Islamic militants

A series of terrorist attacks targeting public transport occurred in Poso, Central Sulawesi, Indonesia, between 5 June and 8 August 2002. In total 7 people were killed and 26 wounded, including an Italian tourist. The first attack occurred on 5 June 2002, when a bomb detonated in an Antariksa-owned public bus servicing the Palu, Poso and Tentena routes. Four passengers were killed instantly and 17 more were wounded, one of who would succumb to his injuries two weeks later. On 13 July 2002 the second attack occurred on the trans-Sulawesi highway when the bus driver found a bag lying on the road and asked his conductor to retrieve it, triggering the device: an 18-year-old bystander was killed and at least 4 others severely wounded in the blast. In the third attack, on 8 August 2002, an Italian tourist was killed and at least 4 Indonesians injured when unknown assailants fired automatic weapons into another bus.

== First attack ==
On the afternoon of 5 June 2002, an improvised explosive device exploded aboard the bus operated by the Antariksa company as it carried 25 passengers, mostly from Tentena. The explosion happened as the vehicle passed through the Landaiga hamlet of Toini village, Poso Pesisir district. Those killed in the blast were identified as Edy Makawimbang, Edy Ulin, Gande Alimbuto and Lastri Octovia Alimbuto. A fifth passenger – Yanti Alimbuto – died of his injuries at the Tentena General Hospital on 13 June.

== Second attack ==
On the afternoon of 12 July 2002 a bus heading from Palu to Tentena along the trans-Sulawesi highway stopped to investigate a suspicious bag lying on the road in the hills nearby Kawua and Ranononue. The bus driver asked his conductor to shift the bag. Upon doing so the device contained inside exploded, severely wounding four people, including the bus conductor. A second device was also reportedly hurled at the window of the stationary bus, killing an 18-year-old female passenger who was still aboard. The attack occurred only 20 meters from a joint army and police security post.

== Third attack ==
On the morning of 8 August 2002, a group of unidentified armed individuals fired automatic weapon fire into a bus travelling near Mayoa village in the South Pamona subdistrict, killing an Italian tourist and wounding four Indonesians. The deceased Italian was identified as Lorenzo Taddei, 34 who had been travelling from Tana Toraja with his wife. Following the attack, Wirabuana Military Area Commander Maj. Gen. Amirul Isnaeni admitted that a number of Kopassus personnel were stationed in the area to investigate the presence of foreign citizens living in Poso, some of whom may have links to al-Qaeda.

== Investigation ==
The bomb blasts are linked to sectarian conflict between Muslims and Christians in Central Sulawesi that killed at least 577 people and displaced another 86,000 during three-year period before a government-sponsored truce agreed in December 2001.

The Indonesian authorities' failure to capture the assailants or uncover their identities and whereabouts sparked speculation that sections of the security forces could have been complicit in the Central Sulawesi attacks. A local Muslim figure speculated that violence had escalated after the Wirabuana military command, based in the South Sulawesi capital of Makassar, sent Indonesian Army special forces (Kopassus) members to Poso.

In response to the attacks, the Indonesian Military called for the imposition of a state of civil emergency or martial law in the restive Poso regency. The suggestion was in response to the rumored presence of several armed foreigners who had allegedly entered Poso on tourist visas. However, then Central Sulawesi Governor, Aminuddin Ponulele, and the provincial police chief Brig. Gen. Zainal Abidin Ishak both voiced opposition to the plan.
