= South Poso Kota =

South Poso Kota Poso Kota Selatan
- District
- South Poso Kota highlighted in dark red
- Coordinates: 1°23′54″S 120°46′10″E
- Country: Indonesia
- Province: Central Sulawesi
- Regency: Poso Regency

Government
  - Camat: Asmawati Gume

Area
  - Total: 9.68 sq mi (25.06 km^{2})

Population (2020 Census)
  - Total: 10,402
  - Density: 1,070/sq mi (415/km^{2})
- Postal code: 94619
- Area code: 72.02.21

South Poso Kota is a district in Poso Regency, Central Sulawesi, Indonesia. Along with the neighboring districts of Poso Kota and North Poso Kota, it makes up the capital region of Poso Regency, Poso, covering 56.57 km^{2} with a population of 47,477 in 2020.

With a population of 10,402 inhabitants and a population density of 415 per km^{2}, South Poso Kota is the 11th most populous and 3rd most densely populated district in Poso Regency. With an area of 25.06 km^{2}, South Poso Kota is one of the smallest districts, with only 0.35% of the total area of Poso Regency.

== Administrative division ==
As of 2026, Poso Kota Selatan consists of 5 administrative villages,

- Bukit Bambu
- Kawua
- Lembomawo
- Ranononcu
- Sayo

== Sources ==
- BPS (2016). Kabupaten Poso dalam Angka 2016 - Poso Regency in Figures 2016 (PDF) (in Indonesian). Poso: Central Bureau of Statistics of Poso Regency. Archived from the original (PDF) on August 28, 2016.
- BPS South Poso Kota (2016). "Kecamatan Poso Kota Selatan dalam Angka 2016 - South Poso Kota Subdistrict in Figures 2016" (PDF) (in Indonesian). Poso: Central Bureau of Statistics of Poso Regency.
