= Walisongo school massacre =

28 May 2000 school massacre in Indonesia

- Part of the Poso riots
- Location: 1°27′0″S 120°46′16″E; Sintuwulemba, Lage, Poso, Central Sulawesi, Indonesia
- Date: 28 May 2000 (UTC+8)
- Target: Muslims
- Attack type: Mass shooting, mass murder, school shooting, religious violence, mass killing
- Weapons: Small arms, homemade firearms, machete, bamboo spears, arrows, slingshots
- Deaths: 200 Deaths
- Perpetrators: Christian militant groups: Dominggus Da Silva; Fabianus Tibo; Marinus Riwu
- Motive: Islamophobia, Political campaign, Christian nationalism

The Walisongo school massacre is the name given to a series of terrorist attacks by Christian sectarian militants on 28 May 2000, upon several predominantly Muslim villages around Poso town, Central Sulawesi, Indonesia, as part of a broader sectarian conflict in the Poso region. Officially, the total number killed in the attacks is 200, but many sources also have different numbers. One commonly used source is 191 fatalities, but there is no definite figure of how many died. The number of deaths is believed to be more than the 39 calculated from bodies later discovered in three mass graves, and "equal to or below" the 191 or 200 quoted by Muslim sources.

The massacre is named for the Pesantren Walisongo boarding school in Sintuwu Lemba where the most infamous murders occurred. Three leaders of local Christian militia groups were later convicted and executed in 2006 for crimes committed during the massacre.

== Prelude ==
The population of the Poso area in Central Sulawesi is geographically divided along Muslim and Christian lines, with coastal villages and cities majority Muslim and highland towns and villages majority indigenous Protestant.

In part due to centuries of shipping trade, the indigenous Muslim population had integrated Bugis migrants from Southern Sulawesi and a small group of Arab traders, whose descendants held important places in Islamic institutions. The district also includes villages built under the government transmigration program, which brought in residents from densely populated areas, such as the primarily Muslim islands of Java and Lombok and a small minority from the Hindu island of Bali. Residents identifying themselves as Muslim attained a majority in Poso district by the late 1990s, and they accounted for 60% of the population according to 2011 government figures.

This significant growth in the Muslim population relative to the Christian population created tension over political representation, particularly when large sections of the Poso economy were controlled by Muslim migrants. The lucrative production and export of cocoa, especially, had been dominated by Bugis and Chinese migrants. Following the devaluation of the rupiah, the cultivation of such cash crops by migrants increased and several transmigrant groups established plantations in previously forested interior areas considered to belong to Christians. This marginalisation of the indigenous Christian population led to fears that the traditional, if unwritten, power-sharing structure of the Poso district, which separated administration between Christians and Muslims, might be threatened.

Human Rights Watch describes that the outbreaks of violence coincided with disputes over candidates for political positions in an economically significant district, as the elected official there was able to grant valuable government contracts. In particular, it notes a dispute for the position of district secretary in April 2000 immediately prior to the massacre and newspapers at the time printed statements by a Unity Party member of the provincial assembly predicting greater violence if the candidate Ladjalani was not chosen as secretary.

=== May riots ===
Both Muslim and Christian leaders blamed the local political elite for using religious differences to further divide the community and enhance their own power and allege unnamed members in Poso's government paid thugs to incite gang fights during the competition for local government positions.

The gang fights escalated to a full-scale riot in Poso and the local police chief called in Palu troops from a police paramilitary unit. On 17 April, the unit allegedly fired upon a crowd of rioting Muslim youths, killing three and inciting the youths to torch at least 300 Christian homes throughout April. The displaced Christians fled to Tentena or the hills around Poso, and there were rumours that many youths took refuge at a training camp of a Christian militia in Kelei.

Early on the morning of 24 May, a gang of Christian militia members, led by transmigrant Fabianus Tibo, killed a policeman and two civilians in central Poso town and took refuge in a Catholic church. A mob, allegedly composed of angry Muslim residents, gathered to burn the building, unwittingly allowing Tibo to escape. The mob was involved in fierce sectarian fighting throughout the day that injured at least ten people in the Sayo district of Poso.

== The attack ==
According to a report compiled by local Islamic academics, on the morning of the attack, some villagers sought refuge at the district military command in Kawua. They allege that the subdistrict police chief forced them to return home, insisting the situation was safe.

During a torrential downpour on 28 May 2000, the Muslim village of Sintuwu Lemba was affected by an electricity blackout, allegedly caused by the attacking militants. Masked members of a Christian militia surrounded the village, populated mainly by resettled Javanese cacao farmers who had previously lived in South Sulawesi, and captured the village women and children and some men. Around 70 adult or adolescent males fled to take refuge in the Walisongo religious boarding school compound where they were set upon and killed with small arms fire and machetes.

Aside from those killed at the school, others captured were reportedly bound and forced to walk two kilometres to the Poso River near the town where many captives were killed, including children and infants, and there were reports that the Poso River was clogged with bodies in the aftermath. Later reports noted that large numbers of bodies were recovered from the river during the conflict; one report stated that 840 bodies of Muslim residents were recovered from the Poso River and surrounding areas over a period of 1.5 years. Many surviving women later reported having been raped by the militants and having seen relatives suffer sexual assault as well. One female resident recalled witnessing 9 of her relatives being murdered by the militants, including her youngest child in third grade. Another male resident, who survived the attack at the school, told a journalist he had been captured again four days later and taken to the river to be executed and escaped.

Testimony to Human Rights Watch indicates the modus operandi of the militants was similar in other towns populated by Muslim residents; a further eight Muslim residents disappeared from the village of Tabalo after the assailants had the locals gather and walk to Kasiguncu township. At least 14 Muslim transmigrants from Lombok and Java subsequently disappeared after being abducted from another town by an estimated 100 masked militants who had ordered the locals to gather at the village hall. Witnesses described the militia as having a list of names of people to abduct and several trucks to transport them.

Some residents of Tabalo recognised the militants as youths from the nearby villages of Tangkora and Sanginora, and even some from their own town who had disguised themselves in all-black attire and ski masks. Several residents described the militants as being armed with bamboo spears and Ambon arrows, powerful slingshots that fire sharp metal bars, among other projectiles.

Anywhere up to 4,000 homes were reported torched across several villages, with the militia specifically targeting those owned by Muslim families. This created a significant movement of Muslim residents, either left homeless or fearing other attacks, to majority Muslim areas within or around Palu and refugee camps were established in the local Palu football stadium by various local Muslim groups. In mid-2008, several Sintuwu Lemba villagers displaced by the violence were still occupying burned-out houses with little to no sanitation.

== Investigation and aftermath ==
Some observers suggested the violence was planned during a national Quran reading contest in Palu attended by the president and vice-president, as authorities would be distracted by the large event and the presence of the Indonesian executive leaders.

Some groups sought retaliation for the attacks, most notably Al-Khaira'at, a prominent Islamic educational institution in Eastern Indonesia, which is alleged to have purchased materials to produce weapons and to have distributed machetes and quantities of money to volunteers sent by truck from Palu to Poso. Witnesses suggest two truck-loads of Palu recruits engaged Christian militia in the village of Tokorondo on 29 May, but suffered casualties and did not participate so directly in the later conflict.

In response to the massacre and retaliation, the Indonesian Regional Military Command sent 1,500 more soldiers, ten tanks, and a combat unit to the Poso area, increasing the military presence in the area to three infantry battalions, or some 2,200 uniformed troops. On 6 June, Christian militia battled with the authorities east of Poso, suffering heavy casualties.

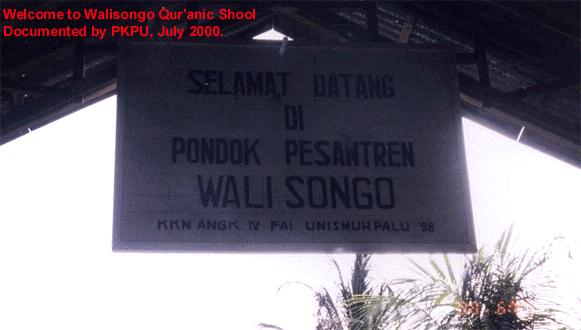
The welcome sign at Walisongo Islamic Boarding School

=== Criminal charges ===
The then governor identified Advent L. Lateka, a Protestant figure, as the mastermind of the massacre and general increase in violence. Lateka was later killed on 2 June when hundreds clashed in the Poso neighbourhood of Kayamanya. In mid-July, another 124 Protestants were arrested southeast of Poso, in Kolonedale, for carrying weapons, mainly machetes.

Later that July, three militants born in East Nusa Tenggara, convicted murderer Tibo, Dominggus da Silva and Don Marinus Riwu, were apprehended on suspicion of organizing the massacre. In 2001, a three-judge court, after hearing testimony from 28 witnesses, convicted Tibo as the leader of a Christian militia called the Red Group and found that da Silva was one of his commanders and that Mr. Riwu took part in the killings. Though the defense claimed Tibo might have been little more than a hired thug, all three were sentenced to death by firing squad and executed in September 2006 for their crimes.

During his trial, Tibo gave in his testimony the names of 16 people who he alleged were the coordinators of the massacre, including several senior Christian church leaders, though none of those named has ever been charged or brought to trial.

=== Subsequent events ===
A similar attack by alleged Red Group members was staged against the majority Muslim village of Buyung Katedo on 3 June 2001, killing at least 14 people, all but two of whom were women and children. Among those murdered in Buyung Katedo were the Imam of the local mosque and Firman, an infant.

Muslim militants are accused of two separate massacres against Sulawesi civilians in October 2003, which killed eight in the predominantly Christian villages of Saatu, Pantangolemba and Pinedampa and another three in the neighboring Morowali regency a few days earlier. Thirty houses and a church were ransacked and torched as well.

As of 2011, the total number of people killed in the 28 May massacre remains unclear, with mass graves still being unearthed across the Poso regency. The bodies of 63 unidentified people were discovered at the base of a ravine nearby Tagolu village several months after while a further mass grave, allegedly containing more deceased residents of Sintuwu Lemba, was unearthed in May 2006 following the information provided at trial by the three convicted militants.
