= Fabianus Tibo =

Indonesian terrorist (1945–2006)

- Born: 5 May 1945; Flores, Japanese-occupied East Indies (now Indonesia)
- Died: 22 September 2006 (aged 61); Palu, Indonesia
- Status: Executed by firing squad
- Conviction: Leading Poso riots

Details
- Date apprehended: July 2000

Fabianus Tibo was an Indonesian Catholic citizen who was executed by firing squad on 22 September 2006, together with Dominggus da Silva and Marinus Riwu, for allegedly leading the Poso riots in 2000, which led to the murders of about 1000 people.

Human rights activists have expressed doubts that Tibo and the other men were the masterminds of the riots. The different treatment of Christians and Muslims in court was also criticised, as few Muslims were punished for their roles in the riots and none were sentenced to more than 15 years in prison. Religious leaders of Christianity and Islam, including Pope Benedict XVI and Abdurrahman Wahid, former President of Indonesia and former leader of Nahdlatul Ulama, protested against the execution of Tibo.

== See also ==
- Capital punishment in Indonesia
