= Malino II Accord =

The Malino II Accord was signed on 13 February 2002 as a settlement between warring parties in the Maluku sectarian conflict that commenced in 1999 in the Maluku Islands of Indonesia. (February 12 according to the UK's Foreign and Commonwealth Office).

It was signed in the Sulawesi town of Malino.
