= 2005 University of Oklahoma bombing =

Bombing near Oklahoma Memorial Stadium

Coordinates: 35°12′25″N 97°26′43″W

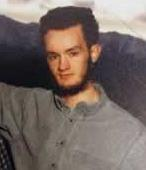
Joel Henry Hinrichs III

The 2005 University of Oklahoma bombing occurred on October 1, 2005 at approximately 7:30 p.m. CDT, when a bomb went off near the George Lynn Cross Hall on Van Vleet Oval on the University of Oklahoma (OU) main campus. The blast took place less than 200 yards west of Oklahoma Memorial Stadium, where 84,501 spectators were attending a football game. The bomber, OU student Joel "Joe" Henry Hinrichs III, was killed in the explosion; no one else was killed.

After the incident, speculation began immediately about Hinrichs' motivation and the number of accomplices, if any. An off-duty police officer had noted Hinrichs talking with a local feed store owner about ammonium nitrate and had begun an investigation. There was innuendo regarding the Pakistani heritage of the bomber's roommate. Terrorism-related speculation was heightened after the explosive agent was found to be TATP, an explosive of similar manufacture, though separate makeup, to the compound used in the July 2005 London bombings, the attempted destruction of an airplane by a shoe bomber, and by Hamas in clandestine devices for use by suicide bombers. The Federal Bureau of Investigation (FBI) and local authorities concluded in 2006 that Hinrichs acted alone and had no assistance from other groups. They could not prove or disprove allegations that Hinrichs intended to enter the packed stadium and kill football fans along with himself.

== Initial events ==
Shortly before halftime of the Saturday evening game between the Oklahoma Sooners and the Kansas State Wildcats, spectators inside the stadium heard an explosion. The explosion was reported as being heard up to five miles away, but people on the east side of the stadium heard only a rumble like low-volume thunder. Some heard nothing. Spectators were not allowed to leave the stadium at half-time, which caused concern among fans who did hear the explosion. No stadium announcements were made until the third and fourth quarters of play, when bus drivers were asked to leave the stadium and meet at the northwest corner of the Asp Avenue Parking Facility. During the last six minutes of the game, an announcement was made over the public address system in the stadium and over local radio for attendees to exit through the south and east gates, and to avoid the area, known as the South Oval, west of the stadium. University officials had decided against giving any further explanations to game attendees because they "didn't want to start any kind of panic."

"Everyone in my section heard it [the explosion]. We looked to the opposite side of the field though thinking it was thunder. Me and my family were gonna go to the university bookstore after the game but the direction we had to go was blocked by caution tape. We knew something was up and got out of there ASAP." said a Sooner fan.

First reports said the explosive device was made using hydrogen peroxide, though as later noted this was only a component of the actual explosive compound used. The initial accounts also indicated a second bomb was found, but these accounts were false. The area was searched by bomb-sniffing dogs, and no more explosives were found. The remains of the backpack contained a circuit board, wires, and a battery; a small explosive was used to safely detonate it at about 9:00 p.m. Other items at the bomb site included a crescent wrench, a white sock with protruding wires, a screwdriver, unused wooden matches, and a chemistry book.

Following the bomb explosion, the entire South Oval was marked as off-limits with crime scene tape. Fans exited the stadium at the conclusion of the game without incident. The South Oval was open the next afternoon except for the immediate area of the explosion, so a broken glass door could be replaced and firefighters could finish spraying down the area with water to wash debris, chemicals and bodily fluids away from the sidewalk and a bus parked there before the preceding day's game. Classes resumed as normal on Monday.

== Identity of the bomber ==
In a press conference the next day, OU president David Boren identified Hinrichs, a 21-year-old mechanical engineering student, as responsible for the detonation. Originally from Colorado Springs, Colorado, Hinrichs was a National Merit Scholar who graduated from Wasson High School in May 2002. His father, Joel Hinrichs Jr., described him as a "very private individual" who had gone through "several severe bouts of depression". Hinrichs' depression was noted as early as ten years old. His father believes that the "underlying cause was his inability to bond with other people. He couldn't make friendships," and also said that Hinrichs began counseling at the university's on-campus health center two years earlier. He did not know if his son was still seeing a counselor, and denied knowledge of the young man's suicidal ideations.

Hinrichs was a member of Triangle Fraternity, a social fraternity of engineering, science and architectural majors. Hinrichs' father said that his son had recently moved out of the Triangle fraternity house because "he didn't bond, didn't relate well to the other fraternity members." In the chapter meeting following the bombing the members of his fraternity were asked to direct all questions and comments to one member of their fraternity and not to discuss anything with the media; this was advised in hopes of limiting rumors and other theories.

== Investigation ==
According to local media, Hinrichs inquired about purchasing a large quantity of ammonium nitrate, the chief ingredient in the 1995 Oklahoma City bombing, at a local feed store two days before the explosion. An off-duty Norman police officer was in the store and overheard the conversation between the feed store owner and Hinrichs. The officer followed Hinrichs out of the store, checked Hinrichs' license plate, and began an investigation when his shift started. That investigation was still in progress when the bomb went off. A computer check, however, showed no outstanding arrest warrants for Hinrichs and no criminal record.

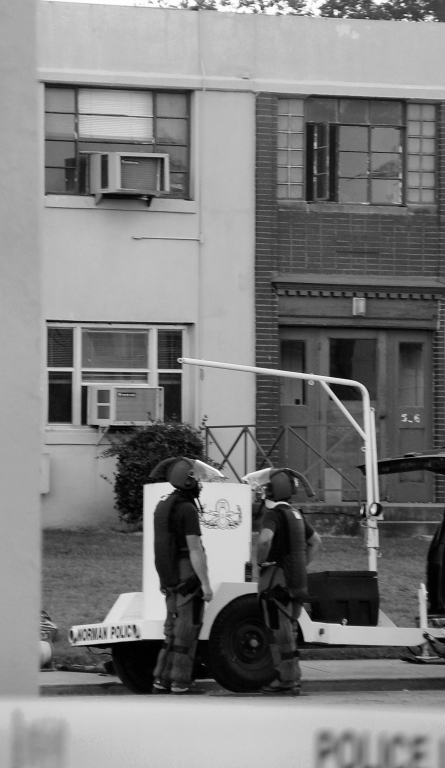
A robot operated remotely prepares to enter Hinrichs' apartment.

After more investigation, the explosive was found not to be hydrogen peroxide, as first indicated. Instead, Hinrichs detonated triacetone triperoxide (TATP), an extremely unstable compound which can be made by mixing common household products like acetone, hydrogen peroxide and an acid catalyst. According to a Norman bomb squad agent, Hinrichs had between two and three pounds of TATP in a bag in his lap.

When investigators entered Hinrichs' apartment the morning after the explosion, they found more TATP and the necessary chemicals to make more of the substance. Since TATP becomes more unstable as time passes, the Norman Police and the FBI evacuated Hinrichs' building and the four apartment buildings that surrounded it as a precaution. A suicide note was displayed on Hinrichs' open laptop monitor. While detectives were unable to completely retrace Hinrichs' steps that day, they did find that Hinrichs typed "None of you are worth living with. You can all kiss my ass" at about 6:15 pm that evening, approximately 75 minutes before he died. The message was on the computer screen when agents entered Hinrichs' apartment.

Hinrichs told friends and fraternity brothers that he liked explosives, and frequently experimented with building and detonating bombs made in or of plastic soda bottles. Hinrichs kept detailed records of many experiments he performed, done mostly at Red Rock Canyon in Caddo County, in the weeks prior to his death. Along with the chemicals and the suicide note, they found used artillery shells, spent bullets, belts made of used brass shell casings, and military ammunition boxes. Other items taken in the search included a thermometer, a slow cooker, rolls of tape, mixing bowls, and plastic containers.

Hinrichs' roommate met Hinrichs when he placed an advertisement online for a roommate, and Hinrichs responded. The two did not socialize, and although Hinrichs showed the remains of detonated explosive devices to at least one fraternity brother, the roommate was unaware of Hinrichs' interest in explosives. There was speculation among some bloggers and pundits that Hinrichs was a Muslim. Ashraf Hussein, the president of OU's Muslim Student Association, said he had never seen Hinrichs at a mosque and that he did not believe Hinrichs was Muslim. As many as eight people, Hakim Mansouri (OU student), Djamal Rabli an OU physics researcher and others including OU Arabic language instructor Hossam Barakat, were detained by the Norman Police Department in the early morning hours of October 2 for questioning. They were again questioned the next day, after which they were cleared of suspicion.

Rumors also circulated that Hinrichs intended to detonate his homemade bomb inside the stadium; these included allegations that he tried to enter the stadium that evening but was denied entry after he refused to be searched. Hinrichs was not a student football season ticket holder; there was no evidence that Hinrichs tried to enter the stadium, and Hinrichs apparently neither bought nor tried to buy a game ticket. Agents scoured hundreds of hours of security camera tapes and found no images of Hinrichs, but, since not all entrances had cameras, they conceded they may never know if Hinrichs wanted to enter or tried to enter the stadium that night. Boren noted that Hinrichs waited until the game was underway and pre-game fans and students had cleared the South Oval; there would have been injuries or deaths to bystanders had Hinrichs detonated his device in the same area prior to or after the game.

Before the October 22, 2005 game, with the Baylor Bears, season ticket holders received a letter from Boren which outlined new stadium security procedures, including restrictions on bags and purses brought into the stadium, more security cameras, and hand searches of belongings. Readmission to the stadium after exiting during the game or at half-time was prohibited except for medical emergencies.

== Conclusion and aftermath ==
In July 2006, the FBI formally declared that there was no evidence Hinrichs was a terrorist. Over 200 witnesses were interviewed about the event, and no indications were found that Hinrichs was an extremist, had extremist views, or was working with anyone else to make and explode the bomb. Agents with the Norman police and bomb squad said that Hinrichs likely "got cocky" with his explosives; a witness saw Hinrichs rummaging around his backpack shortly before it detonated.

In November 2006, Thomas Carlisle Hinrichs, Joel Hinrichs' brother, was arrested after he allegedly attacked his father and threatened to murder an FBI agent. He was found guilty of the crime in June and was sentenced to 37 months imprisonment in October 2007.

In August 2007, the university held an emergency drill to better prepare for future events during home football games. A gas line rupture inside Oklahoma Memorial Stadium was simulated. More than 500 students participated, along with responders from the Department of Homeland Security, the Federal Emergency Management Agency (FEMA), the Norman Police Department and Fire Department, the University of Oklahoma Police Department, and the Oklahoma Highway Patrol. It was the first university stadium emergency drill of its kind in the United States.
