= Poso =

- Town
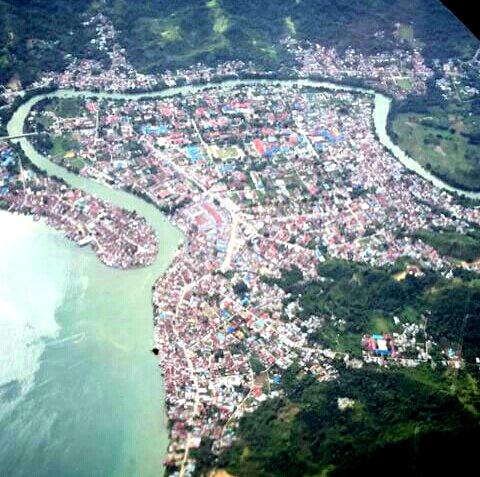
- Poso in 2015

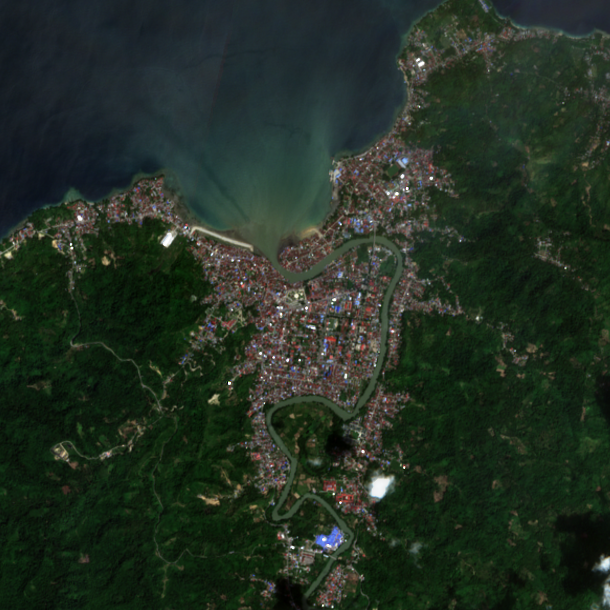
- Sentinel-2 L2A satellite image, featuring the city of Poso in December 2020

- Location of Poso in Sulawesi
- Coordinates: 1°24′S 120°45′E
- Country: Indonesia
- Province: Central Sulawesi
- Regency: Poso

Area
  - Total: 66.8 km^{2} (25.8 sq mi)

Population (mid 2024 estimate)
  - Total: 47,592
- Time zone: UTC+8 (Central Indonesia Time)
- Website: http://posokab.go.id/

Poso (Old Spelling: Posso) is the administrative capital of Poso Regency, Indonesia. It is the main port and transportation hub for the central-southern coast of Central Sulawesi. Its urban area consists of three districts, Poso Kota, North Poso Kota, and South Poso Kota. Poso lies in the middle of the province on the shore of the Gulf of Tomini, right in the central part of Sulawesi Island. With a total population of 47,592 in mid 2024, it is one of the biggest and oldest towns in the province.

Poso began to develop as a small port town located at the mouth of the Poso River at the end of the 19th century—making it one of the oldest towns in Central Sulawesi, its presence was considered important for the Dutch to control the southern region of Tomini in the early days of their arrival. Poso was the administrative center of Landschap Poso, Onderafdeling Poso, and later Afdeling Poso during colonial times. Amid World War II, the Japanese made Poso one of their military posts. Post-independence, Poso was chosen as the capital of the newly formed Central Sulawesi in 1948 before the capital was moved to Palu in 1951.

Poso's central location has historically made it a strategic stopover point for travelers moving between the north and south, as well as the west and east of Sulawesi. This has contributed to a diverse population, comprising various ethnicities, religions, and cultural backgrounds. The inhabitants are dispersed from coastal areas to the mountainous regions, with trade and services serving as the primary economic activities.

Poso is crossed by the Trans-Sulawesi National Highway and served by Kasiguncu Airport, linking it to other cities in Sulawesi such as Palu and Makassar.

== Geography ==
=== Climate ===
Poso has a tropical rainforest climate (Af) with heavy rainfall year-round.

== History ==
Poso has a controversial history, that of the Poso riots, a religious conflict in the late 1990s, that then led to the Walisongo school massacre, led by Dominggus da Silva.

Climate data for Poso
Month	Jan	Feb	Mar	Apr	May	Jun	Jul	Aug	Sep	Oct	Nov	Dec	Year
Mean daily maximum °C (°F)	30.6 (87.1)	30.7 (87.3)	30.9 (87.6)	31.0 (87.8)	31.1 (88.0)	30.3 (86.5)	29.7 (85.5)	30.8 (87.4)	31.2 (88.2)	32.2 (90.0)	31.8 (89.2)	31.1 (88.0)	31.0 (87.7)
Daily mean °C (°F)	26.8 (80.2)	26.8 (80.2)	27.0 (80.6)	27.0 (80.6)	27.4 (81.3)	26.6 (79.9)	25.9 (78.6)	26.6 (79.9)	26.7 (80.1)	27.5 (81.5)	27.5 (81.5)	27.1 (80.8)	26.9 (80.4)
Mean daily minimum °C (°F)	23.0 (73.4)	23.0 (73.4)	23.1 (73.6)	23.1 (73.6)	23.7 (74.7)	23.0 (73.4)	22.2 (72.0)	22.5 (72.5)	22.3 (72.1)	22.9 (73.2)	23.2 (73.8)	23.2 (73.8)	22.9 (73.3)
Average rainfall mm (inches)	162 (6.4)	157 (6.2)	247 (9.7)	291 (11.5)	253 (10.0)	256 (10.1)	219 (8.6)	193 (7.6)	201 (7.9)	144 (5.7)	197 (7.8)	197 (7.8)	2,517 (99.3)
Source: Climate-Data.org

== Tourism and culture ==
Poso can be reached by plane from Palu or by bus from many other big cities on Sulawesi and is situated on the equator. It features tropical rain forest, seashore gardens, and other natural scenery. Sintuwu Maroso Square is the main town square and is located in central Poso. Rumah Katu Marine Park is a water park located 10 km from the center of Poso.

Modero is a well-known traditional dance that is performed during the celebration of rice harvesting (Padungku), usually in the evenings.

== See also ==
- Poso riots
- 2002 Poso bus attacks
- 2005 Indonesian beheadings of Christian girls
