= Poso Regency =

Regency in Central Sulawesi, Indonesia

Poso Regency Kabupaten Poso
- Regency
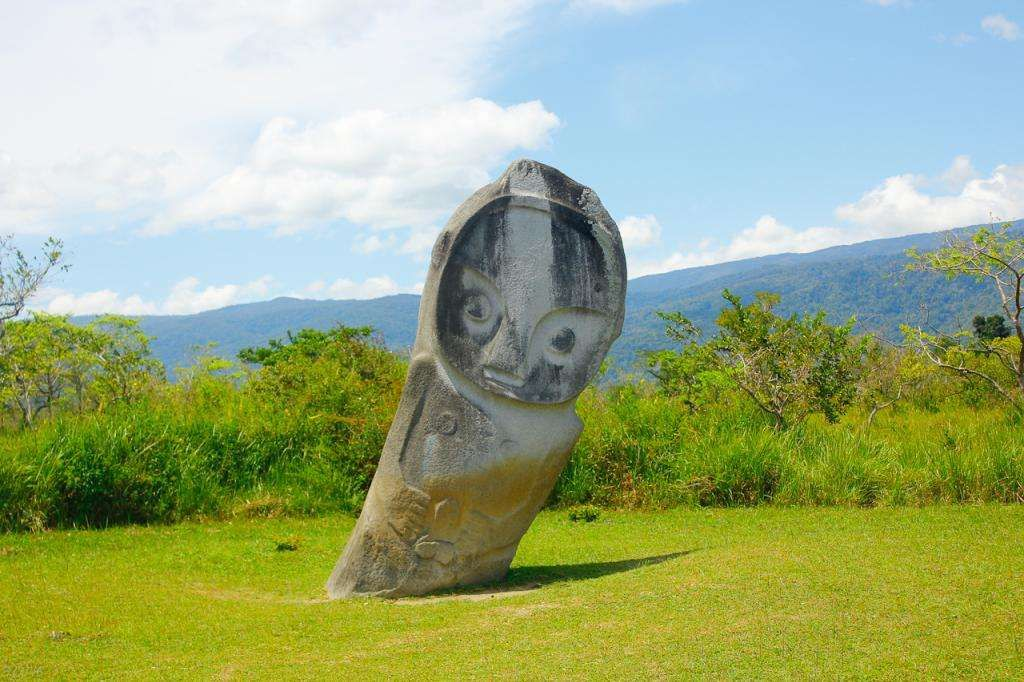
- A megalithic statue on Bada valley

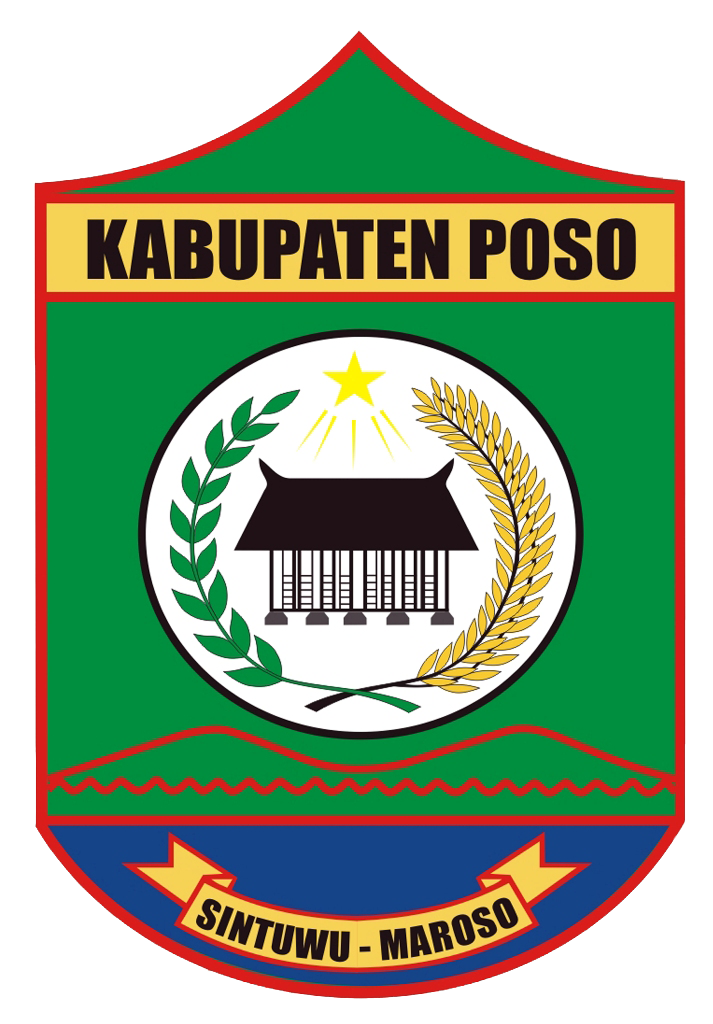
- Coat of arms
- Motto: Sintuwu Maroso (Strong Brotherly Ties)
- Location within Central Sulawesi

- Location in Sulawesi and Indonesia Poso Regency (Indonesia)
- Coordinates: 1°22′59″S 120°44′55″E
- Country: Indonesia
- Province: Central Sulawesi
- Capital: Poso

Government
  - Regent: Verna Gladies Merry Inkiriwang
  - Vice Regent: Soeharto Kandar

Area
  - Total: 7,553.43 km^{2} (2,916.40 sq mi)

Population (mid 2025 estimate)
  - Total: 256,672
  - Density: 33.9809/km^{2} (88.0100/sq mi)
- Time zone: UTC+8 (ICST)
- Area code: (+62) 452
- Website: posokab.go.id

Poso Regency is a regency of Central Sulawesi Province of Indonesia. It covers an area of 7,553.43 km^{2}, and had a population of 209,228 at the 2010 Census and 244,875 at the 2020 Census; the official estimate as of mid-2025 was 256,672 (comprising 132,460 males and 124,212 females). The principal town lies at Poso (with 47,592 inhabitants in mid 2024).

== History ==
The regency as created in 1959 covered a much larger area to the east. However, on 4 October 1999 the regency's south-eastern districts were split off to form a separate Morowali Regency, and on 18 December 2003 the regency's north-eastern districts were likewise split off to form a separate Tojo Una-Una Regency. In 2007 there were calls to divide the remaining Poso Regency into two regencies to overcome religious-based conflicts; one new regency in the southeastern and western sectors would by named Tentena Regency (comprising the first twelve kecamatan listed below), while the residual Poso Regency in the northeast sector (bordering the Gulf of Tomini) would consist of the last seven kecamatan listed below; however, this proposal was not enacted.

== Geography ==
Poso Regency is located within the folds of various mountain ranges, namely the Fennema and Toneba Mountains in the west, the Takolekaju Mountains in the southwest, the Verbeek Mountains in the southeast, and the Pompangeo and Lumut Mountains in the northeast.

== Administrative districts ==
At the time of the 2010 Census, the Poso Regency was divided at 2010 into eighteen districts (kecamatan), but an additional 19th district (Pamona Pusalemba) was subsequently added by splitting off the western and southern villages of Pamona Utara District. The districts are tabulated below with their areas and their populations at the 2010 Census and the 2020 Census, together with the official estimates as of mid-2025. The table also includes the locations of the district administrative centres, the numbers of rural and urban villages in each district (totalling 142 rural desa and 28 urban kelurahan), and its postal code.

Kode Wilayah	Name of District (kecamatan)	Area in km^{2}	Pop'n Census 2010	Pop'n Census 2020	Pop'n estimate mid 2025	Admin centre	No. of villages	Post code
72.02.06	Pamona Selatan (South Pamona)	456.79	18,372	20,977	22,694	Pendolo	12	94664
72.02.20	Pamona Barat (West Pamona)	444.61	9,344	10,214	10,643	Meko	6	94662
72.02.26	Pamona Tenggara (Southeast Pamona)	309.34	6,487	7,888	8,091	Korobono	9	94665
72.02.27	Pamona Utara (North Pamona)	613.57	30,191	14,628	15,098	Sulewana	10^{(a)}	94667
72.02.04	Pamona Pusalemba	496.33	^{(a)}	19,357	20,050	Tentena	11^{(b)}	94663
72.02.05	Pamona Timur (East Pamona)	602.17	9,531	12,271	13,049	Taripa	13	94666
Sub-totals	Southeast Sector	2,922.81	73,925	85,335	89,625		61	
72.02.09	Lore Selatan (South Lore)	646.53	5,631	6,774	7,095	Gintu	8	94655
72.02.23	Lore Barat (West Lore)	270.27	2,821	3,188	3,382	Lengkeka	6	94654
72.02.07	Lore Utara (North Lore)	573.67	11,902	15,659	16,656	Wuasa	7	94658
72.02.08	Lore Tengah (Central Lore)	698.78	4,033	4,971	5,517	Doda	8	94656
72.02.24	Lore Timur (East Lore)	236.84	4,877	6,690	7,528	Maholo	5	94657
72.02.25	Lore Peore	405.62	2,944	4,015	4,500	Watutau	5	94653
Sub-totals	Western Sector	2,831.71	32,208	41,297	44,678		39	
72.02.02	Poso Pesisir (Coastal Poso)	286.39	20,098	22,285	24,089	Mapane	16^{(c)}	94652
72.02.19	Poso Pesisir Selatan (South Coastal Poso)	582.63	8,842	9,910	10,102	Tangkura	9	94650
72.02.18	Poso Pesisir Utara (North Coastal Poso)	440.05	15,681	17,427	17,935	Tambarana	10	94651
72.02.01	Poso Kota (Poso Town)	14.25	20,250	24,145	24,134	Gebangrejo	7^{(d)}	94617: 94619
72.02.21	Poso Kota Selatan (South Poso Town)	28.64	8,992	10,402	10,080	Kawua	5^{(d)}	94613: 94619
72.02.22	Poso Kota Utara (North Poso Town)	23.91	11,058	12,930	13,595	Lawanga	7^{(d)}	94611: 94616
72.02.03	Lage	442.84	18,174	21,144	22,434	Tagolu	16	94661
Sub-totals	Northeast Sector	1,798.91	103,095	118,243	122,369		70	

Notes: (a) including 3 urban kelurahan (Petirodongi, Sawidago and Tendeadongi). (b) including 3 urban kelurahan (Pamona, Sangele and Tentena). (c) including 3 urban kelurahan (Mapane, Kasiguncu and Tabalu).
(d) all 19 classed as urban kelurahan, comprising 7 in Poso Town (Gebangrejo, Kayamanya, Moengko Baru, Moengko Lama, Gebangrejo Barat, Gebangrejo Timur and Kayamanya Sentral), 5 in South Poso Town (Bukit Bambu, Kawua, Lembomawo, Ranononcu and Sayo) and 7 in North Poso Town (Bonesompe, Kasintuwu, Lawanga, Lawanga Tawongan, Lombogia, Madale and Tegalrejo).

== Social ==
=== Religions ===
Religions in Poso – 2020
Religions	Percentage
Protestant	59.45%
Islam	33.6%
Hinduism	5.6%
Roman Catholic	1.35%
Buddhism	0%

The population of Poso Regency is made up of various ethnic groups, so it is considered a multicultural regency in Indonesia. The population is also quite diverse in religion. Data from the Ministry of Religion in 2020, around 60.80% (151,261 people) embraced Christianity. Poso Regency's Religious Office noted that the majority of the population in Poso in 2020 was Protestant, with the number of adherents stated to be as many as 147,899 inhabitants (59% of the population). This was followed by 83,597 Muslims (33.6%), 13,937 Hindus (5.6%), 3.362 Roman Catholics (1.35%) and 4 Buddhists, respectively. As of 2022, the number of places of worship in Poso Regency consisted of 280 mosques, 690 Protestant churches, 26 Catholic churches and 102 Hindu temples.

Prior to colonial rule, the inhabitants of Poso Regency followed a traditional belief system known as Lamoa. Islam became the first prominent religion in Poso during the early 19th century when it was brought by the Mandarese people who settled in the To Kadombuku area (present-day Tomasa River region), although the exact means of their arrival remain unknown. The spread of Christianity in Poso began in the late 19th century with the arrival of Albert Christian Kruyt, a Dutch Calvinist missionary sent by the Netherlands Missionary Society (NZG) to initiate a mission. Following seventeen years of work, their efforts bore fruit when hundreds of To Pebato residents were baptized on Christmas Eve, 25 December 1909. Central Sulawesi Christian Church (GKST) is a church organization that was established on 18 October 1947 in Tentena. GKST serves Central, West and South Sulawesi. In 2006, 188,000 people were registered as members, and there were 376 congregations served by 625 priests.

== Tourism ==
Tambing Lake is located in Lore Lindu National Park, 3 hours drive from Palu and 100 meters away from Palu-Napu Road. In 2014, 3,000 foreign tourists visited Tambing Lake, which is known as Endemic Bird Paradise, with 30 percent of the 270 kinds of birds endemic.

== Ecology ==
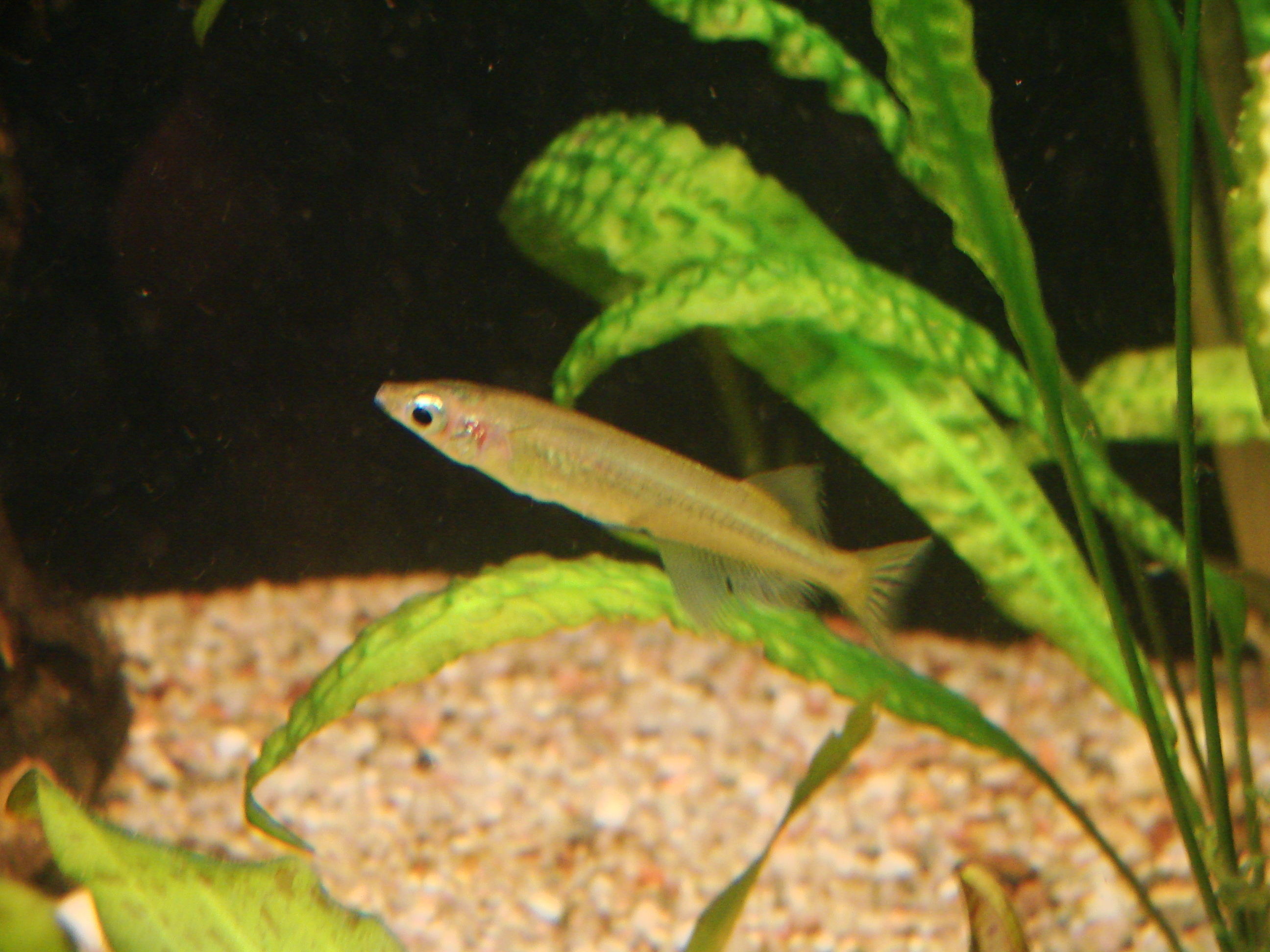
Oryzias sarasinorum, endemic fish that only exist in Lake Poso and Lake Lindu

Sulawesi black Ebony, also known as diospyros celebica, naturally can be found in Central Sulawesi (Parigi, Poso, Donggala), South Sulawesi (Maros), West Sulawesi (Mamuju) and Maluku. The International Union for Conservation of Nature (IUCN) has issued their red list in 2000 and D. celebica belong to the category of vulnerable species, which means that ebony is at the limit of high risk for extinction in the wild (vulnerable to exploitation).

Most of the endemic fauna in Poso is located in the area of cultural and natural heritage, such as Lake Poso and Lore Lindu National Park. Whitten (1987), Maurice Kottelat, and L.R. Parenti states that there are several species of endemic biota that is only found in Lake Poso, such as Xenopoecilus poptae (Adrianichthys poptae); Adrianichthys kruyti, Weberogobius amadi and Nomorhamphus celebensis. Other endemic fish is Anguilla celebensis, Xenopoecilus sarasinorum, Xenopoecilus oophorus (adrianichthys oophorus), Adrianichthys roseni; gastropods such as Miratesta celebensis; and some small shrimp (Caridina sp).
