= 2004 in Indonesia =

- Centuries: 20th; 21st
- Decades: 1980s; 1990s; 2000s; 2010s; 2020s
- See also: History of Indonesia; Timeline of Indonesian history; List of years in Indonesia

Events from the year 2004 in Indonesia

== Incumbents ==
President	Vice President
Susilo Bambang Yudhoyono	Jusuf Kalla

== Events ==
- January 10 – 2004 Palopo cafe bombing: Four people are killed and three injured.
- April 5 – Indonesian legislative election, 2004.
- May 5 – Final election results are announced: of 113,462,414 valid ballot papers, the Party of the Functional Groups (Golkar) win the largest number of seats on the People's Representative Council. However, fourteen of the twenty-four participating parties refuse to certify the election results after allegations of irregular vote counting.
- July 5–September 20 – Indonesian presidential election, 2004.
- September 9 – 2004 Australian Embassy bombing in Jakarta: several civilian workers are killed, but all embassy staff survive.
- November 13 – 2004 Poso bus bombing; six people are killed.
- November 26 – November 2004 Nabire earthquake.
- November 30 – Lion Air Flight 583 crashed onto a cemetery on landing; 25 people on board were killed in the crash, including the captain.
- December 26 – The 2004 Indian Ocean earthquake and tsunami have huge effects on Indonesia.

== Births ==
- May 16 – Azizi Asadel, Indonesian singer, dancer, and actress
- July 13 – Muhammad Naufal Zidan, University student murdered August 2, 2023 in Beji, Depok, West Java.

== Deaths ==
- January 11 – Asrul Sani, Indonesian writer, poet and screenwriter (born 1926)
- June 15 – Bagong Kussudiardja, Indonesian artist, contemporary dance choreographer and painter (born 1928)
- July 2 – Mochtar Lubis, Indonesian journalist and novelist (born 1922)
- July 14 – Hoegeng Iman Santoso, 5th Chief of the Indonesian National Police (born 1921)
- August 29 – Leonardus Benjamin Moerdani, Indonesian military leader and politician (born 1932)
- September 8 – Mohammad Jusuf, Indonesian military general (born 1928)
- November 8 – Wahono, Indonesian politician (born 1925)
- December 11 – Harry Roesli, Indonesian singer and songwriter (born 1951)
