= 2009 in Indonesia =

- Centuries: 19th; 20th; 21st
- Decades: 1980s; 1990s; 2000s; 2010s; 2020s
- See also: History of Indonesia; Timeline of Indonesian history; List of years in Indonesia

Events from the year 2009 in Indonesia

== Incumbents ==
President	Vice President
Susilo Bambang Yudhoyono	Boediono

== Events ==
- 100% Cinta Indonesia
- 2009 Pendet controversy
- Bloom Agro is founded.
- January 4: 2009 Papua earthquakes
- January 11: The MV Teratai Prima sunk.
- February 11: 2009 Talaud Islands earthquake
- March 27: due to a dam failure the Situ Gintung lake is drained.
- April 9: Indonesian legislative election, 2009
- April 17: Mimika Air Flight 514
- May 20: 2009 Indonesian Air Force C-130H Hercules crash
- June 5: Miss Indonesia 2009
- July 8: Indonesian presidential election, 2009
- July 17: 2009 Jakarta bombings
- August 2: Merpati Nusantara Airlines Flight 9760
- September 2: 2009 West Java earthquake
- September 30: 2009 Sumatra earthquakes
- October 8: 2009 Sulawesi superbolide
- October 9: Puteri Indonesia 2009
- November 22: Dumai Express 10

== Television debuts ==
- Angel's Diary
- Bayu Cinta Luna
- Cinderella (Apakah Cinta Hanyalah Mimpi?)
- Safa dan Marwah

== Sport ==
- 2009 Indonesia national football team results
- 2008–09 Indonesia Super League
- 2008–09 Liga Indonesia Premier Division
- 2009 Copa Indonesia Final
- 2009 Commonwealth Bank Tournament of Champions
- 2009 Asian Archery Championships
- 2009 FIBA Asia Champions Cup
- 2009 Asian Cycling Championships
- 2009 Indonesia Super Series
- Indonesia at the 2009 Asian Indoor Games
- Indonesia at the 2009 Southeast Asian Games
- Indonesia at the 2009 World Championships in Athletics
- Indonesia at the 2009 Asian Youth Games
