= 2002 in Indonesia =

- Centuries: 20th; 21st
- Decades: 1980s; 1990s; 2000s; 2010s; 2020s
- See also: History of Indonesia; Timeline of Indonesian history; List of years in Indonesia

Events from the year 2002 in Indonesia

== Incumbents ==
President	Vice President
Megawati Soekarnoputri	Hamzah Haz

== Events ==
- January 16 – Garuda Indonesia Flight 421 from Ampenan to Yogyakarta encountered severe thunderstorm activity during approach to its destination, suffered flameout in both engines, and ditched in a shallow river, resulting in one fatality and several injuries.
- February – The Bali Process is established.
- February 13 – the Maluku sectarian conflict officially ends with the signing of the Malino II Accord.
- May 20 – East Timor regains its independence after 2-and-a-half years of United Nations administration and 26 years of occupation by Indonesia since 1975.
- June 5 – The first of the 2002 Poso bus attacks takes place.
- July 9 – At least 46 people were killed after a fire broke out at a karaoke venue in Palembang, South Sumatra.
- October 12 – Jemaah Islamiyah militants detonate multiple bombs in two nightclubs in Kuta, Bali, killing 202 people and injuring over 300 in the worst terrorist act in Indonesia's history.
- November 2 – An earthquake occurred at 01:26 UTC with a magnitude of 7.3 on the moment magnitude scale with an epicenter just north of Simeulue island and caused three deaths.
- December 5 – A bomb exploded within an inner-city McDonald's restaurant in Makassar. The bombing was conducted by the Islamic group "Laskar Jundullah", which caused death to 3 people, including the bomber himself, and injured 15 others.
- December 17 – The International Court of Justice (ICJ) opined that Ligitan and Sipadan islands, which were disputed between Indonesia and Malaysia, belonged to Malaysia.

== Births ==
- September 14 – Boni Avibus, activist, actress, dramatist, orator, poets and theater performer.

== Deaths ==
- March 12 – Hartini, wife of Indonesian president Sukarno (b. 1924)
- March 28 – Andi Amrullah, Indonesian writer (b. 1941)
- November 14 – Gedong Bagus Oka, Indonesian Hindu reformer and philosopher (b. 1921)
