= 1996 in Indonesia =

- Centuries: 18th; 19th; 20th; 21st
- Decades: 1970s; 1980s; 1990s; 2000s; 2010s
- See also: History of Indonesia; Timeline of Indonesian history; List of years in Indonesia

The following lists events that happened during 1996 in Indonesia.

== Incumbents ==
- President: Suharto
- Vice President: Try Sutrisno
- Chief Justice: Suryono (until November 1), Sarwata (starting November 1)

== Events ==
=== January ===
- January 8 – Mapenduma hostage crisis: The Free Papua Movement took 26 members of a World Wildlife Fund research mission captive at Mapenduma, Jayawijaya in Irian Jaya (now Papua Province), Indonesia.
- January 19 – An Indonesian ferry sinks off the northern tip of Sumatra, drowning more than 100 people.

=== February ===
- February 17 – The 8.2 M_{w} Biak earthquake strikes the Papua province of eastern Indonesia with a maximum Mercalli intensity of VIII (Severe). A large tsunami followed, leaving 166 people dead or missing and 423 injured.

=== July ===
- July 27 – Indonesian government forces attacked the head office of the Indonesian Democratic Party, which was being occupied by supporters of recently ousted party leader Megawati Sukarnoputri.

=== August ===
- August 1 – A pro-democracy demonstration supporting Megawati Sukarnoputri in Indonesia is broken up by riot police.
- August 13 – Fuad Muhammad Syafruddin, an Indonesian journalist, was attacked at his house by two unidentified assailants. He died three days later.

== Births ==
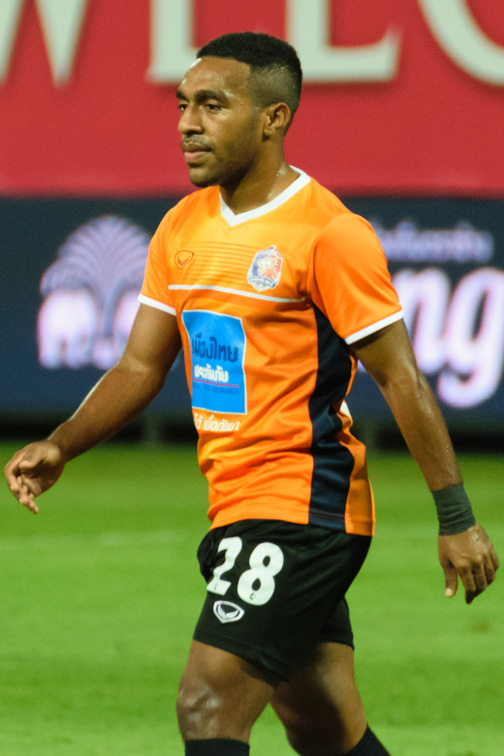
Terens Puhiri

=== February ===
- February 13 – Muhammad Rian Ardianto, Indonesian badminton player

=== October ===
- October 13 – Terens Puhiri, Indonesian footballer
- October 20 – Anthony Sinisuka Ginting, Indonesian badminton player

=== November ===
- November 1 – Sean Gelael, Indonesian racing driver

== Deaths ==
=== April ===
- April 28 – Siti Hartinah, 2nd First Lady of Indonesia, wife of Suharto (b. 1923)

=== May ===
- May 23 – Kronid Lyubarsky, Russian journalist and human rights activist (b. 1934)

=== August ===
- August 16 – Fuad Muhammad Syafruddin, Indonesian journalist (b. 1963)

== Works cited ==
- Friend, Theodore (2003). Indonesian Destinies. Belknap Press of Harvard University Press. ISBN 9780674011373.
- Ricklefs, M.C. (2008) [1981]. A History of Modern Indonesia Since c.1300 (4th ed.). London: MacMillan. ISBN 978-0-230-54685-1.
- Tesoro, Josė Manuel (2004). The Invisible Palace. Jakarta: Equinox. ISBN 979-97964-7-4.
