= 1998 in Indonesia =

- Centuries: 20th; 21st
- Decades: 1970s; 1980s; 1990s; 2000s; 2010s
- See also: History of Indonesia; Timeline of Indonesian history; List of years in Indonesia

The following lists events that happened during 1998 in Indonesia.

In Indonesia, this year was noted for the May 1998 riots due to dissatisfaction with Suharto's 31-year New Order regime, culminating in Suharto's resignation on 21 May 1998.

== Incumbents ==
- President: Suharto (until 21 May), B. J. Habibie (after 21 May)
- Vice-President: Try Sutrisno (until 11 March), B. J. Habibie (11 March to 21 May), Vacant (after 21 May)

== Events ==
=== February ===
- 11 February – J. Soedradjad Djiwandono is dismissed from his office of the governor of the Bank of Indonesia.

=== May ===
- 4 May – The start of the May riots in Indonesia.
- 12 May – Trisakti shootings: Indonesian National Army soldiers fire and kill four protestors. This causes the start of the riots in Jakarta.
- 15 May – 1998 Klender mall fire: A fire in the Klender Mall due to looting leaves at least 200 people dead.
- 21 May – Fall of Suharto: Suharto resigns as president.

=== August ===
- 22 August – The 1990–1998 Indonesian military operations in Aceh ends.

=== October ===
- 26 October – 1998 Indonesia Open starts.

=== November ===
- 1 November – 1998 Indonesia Open ends.
- 13 November – Semanggi I shooting: 17 people are killed and many injured after troops fired on protestors near the Semanggi intercharge. Maria Catarina Sumarsih held Prabowo Subianto responsibilities for involved during the event and in a series of human rights abuses.

=== December ===
- 25 December–29 December – First Poso riot.

== Births ==
- 25 February – Rizky Febian, singer-songwriter, actor, TV presenter.
- 31 August – Sugeng Efendi, professional footballer.

== Deaths ==
- 8 January – Alamsyah Ratu Perwiranegara, military general (born 1925).
- 9 October – Ita Martadinata Haryono, human rights activist (born 1980).

== Sources ==
- Purdey, Jemma (2006). Anti-Chinese Violence in Indonesia, 1996–1999. Honolulu, H.I.: University of Hawaii Press. ISBN 978-0-8248-3057-1.
