= 1965 in Indonesia =

- Centuries: 20th; 21st
- Decades: 1940s; 1950s; 1960s; 1970s; 1980s
- See also: History of Indonesia; Timeline of Indonesian history; List of years in Indonesia

1965 in Indonesia was the year of significant change between the Old Order of Sukarno, and the transition to the New Order of Suharto.

It was also the year in which a large number of people were killed.

A number of 'labels' for the year and events have been created. Sukarno called it the Year of Living Dangerously - as a consequence the phrase was used in a novel The Year of Living Dangerously (novel) and film - The Year of Living Dangerously (film).

== Incumbents ==
- President: Sukarno

== Births ==
- March 16 – Utut Adianto, politician and chess player
- April 15 – Lilies Handayani, archer
- June 22 – Gamal Abdul Nasir Zakaria, lecturer and writer
- October 26 – Napoleon Bonaparte, police officer (died 2026)
- December 12 – Desmond Junaidi Mahesa, politician (died 2023)
