= 1997 in Indonesia =

- Centuries: 20th; 21st
- Decades: 1970s; 1980s; 1990s; 2000s; 2010s
- See also: History of Indonesia; Timeline of Indonesian history; List of years in Indonesia

The following lists events from 1997 in Indonesia.

== Incumbents ==
- President – Suharto
- Vice President – Try Sutrisno

== Events ==
- 23 May
  - Manusela National Park established
  - Riots take place in Banjarmasin on the last day of campaigning before elections, killing at least 130 people.
- 29 May
  - Legislative elections
  - Dedi Omar Hamdun, a businessman and politician from United Development Party, and husband of Eva Arnaz, was kidnapped during legislative elections along with his driver, Noval Alkatiri and business colleague, Ismail.
- September – Forest fires break out due to a prolonged drought and last into 1998.
- 26 September – Garuda Indonesia Flight 152 crashes in Northeastern Sumatra killing all 234 people on board.
- 11 October–19 October – The Southeast Asian Games take place in Jakarta.
- 19 December – SilkAir Flight 185 crashes into the Musi River near Palembang in South Sumatra killing all 104 people on board.
- Lorentz National Park established.

== Births ==
- 16 March – Diananda Choirunisa, archer
- 3 June – Mutiara Baswedan, lawyer, educator, and model

== Deaths ==
- 27 July - K'tut Tantri, radio broadcaster (born 1898)
