= 2003 in Indonesia =

- Centuries: 19th; 20th; 21st
- Decades: 1980s; 1990s; 2000s; 2010s; 2020s
- See also: History of Indonesia; Timeline of Indonesian history; List of years in Indonesia

The following lists events that happened during 2003 in Indonesia.

== Incumbents ==
President	Vice President
Megawati Soekarnoputri	Hamzah Haz

== Events ==
=== April ===
- April 4 – A raid was launched by an unidentified mob, against the armory of the Wamena District of the Indonesian Army, which was followed by a sweeping operation and forced relocation of civilians around Wamena by the Indonesian Army and the Indonesian National Police.

=== August ===
- August 5 – A car bomb exploded at the Marriott Hotel in Jakarta, Indonesia, killing 12 people and injuring 150.

=== December ===
- December 31 – A bombing, which occurred during a concert at a night market in Peureulak, Nanggroe Aceh Darussalam province, Indonesia, killed at least 10 people, including three children, and wounded 45 others.

== Births ==
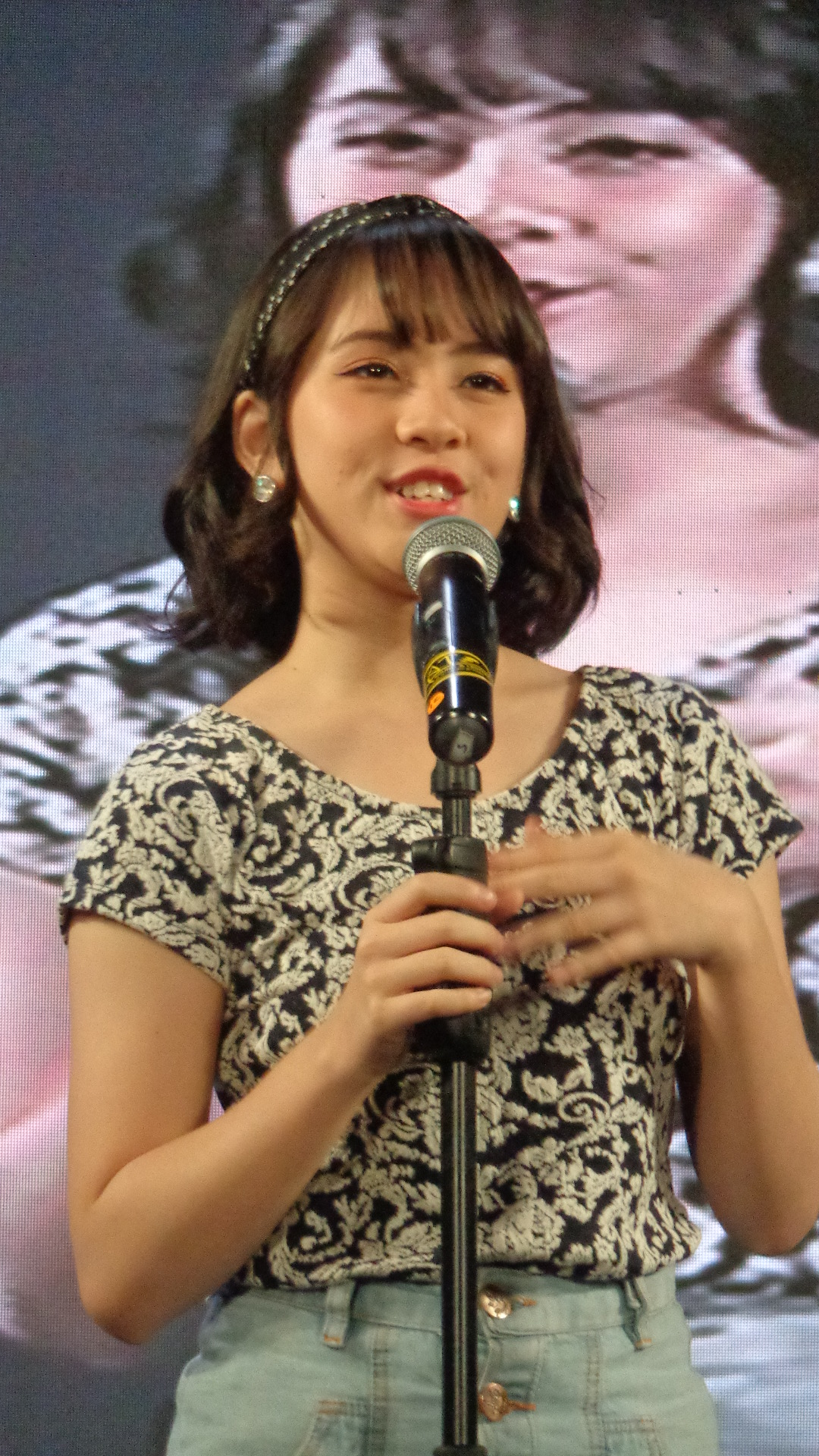
Adhisty Zara

- May 29 – Priska Madelyn Nugroho, Indonesian tennis player
- June 21 – Adhisty Zara, Indonesian singer, performer and actress
- June 21 – Lyodra Ginting, Indonesian singer
- July 16 – Rafly Altama, Indonesian actor
- October 31 – Rafi Sudirman, Indonesian singer, songwriter and actor
- December 30 – El Putra Sarira, Indonesian actor

== Deaths ==
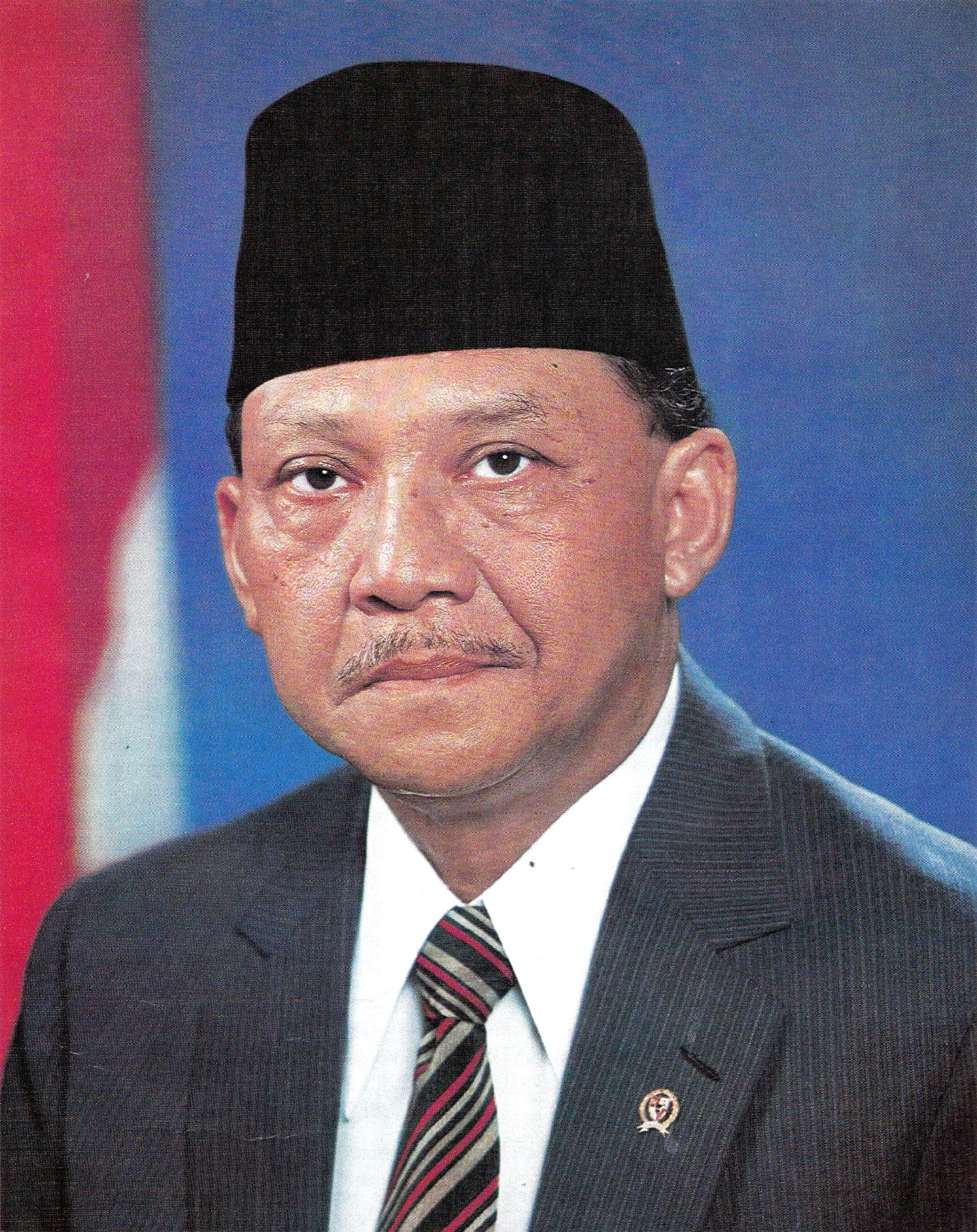
Umar Wirahadikusumah

=== March ===
- March 21 – Umar Wirahadikusumah, 4th Vice President of Indonesia (b. 1924)

=== April ===
- April 4 – Abdul Kadir, Indonesian footballer (b. 1948)
- April 13 – Farouk Afero, Pakistani-born Indonesian film actor (b. 1939)

=== May ===
- May 6 – Ateng, Indonesian actor and comedian (b. 1942)

=== August ===
- August 16 – Ben Mang Reng Say, Indonesian politician (b. 1928)

=== December ===
- December 29 – Ersa Siregar, Indonesian reporter and journalist, shot dead in a shootout between TNI and GAM (b. 1955)
