= 2000 in Indonesia =

- Centuries: 18th; 19th; 20th; 21st
- Decades: 1980s; 1990s; 2000s; 2010s; 2020s
- See also: History of Indonesia; Timeline of Indonesian history; List of years in Indonesia

The following lists events that happened during 2000 in Indonesia

== Incumbents ==
President	Vice President
Abdurrahman Wahid	Megawati Soekarnoputri

== Events ==
- Indonesia 2000 census

=== May ===
- May 28: 2000 Walisongo school massacre

=== June ===
- June 4: The 7.9 M_{w} Enggano earthquake shakes southwestern Sumatra with a maximum Mercalli intensity of VI (Strong). One-hundred and three people were killed and 2,174–2,585 were injured.

=== August ===
- August 1: 2000 Philippine consulate bombing

=== September ===
- September 8: United Nations Security Council Resolution 1319
- September 14: Jakarta Stock Exchange bombing

=== December ===
- December 24: Christmas Eve 2000 Indonesia bombings

== Births ==
- July 1: Lalu Muhammad Zohri, Indonesian sprinter
- October 15: Melki Sedek Huang, Indonesian activist and sex offender
