= 2007 in Indonesia =

- Centuries: 19th; 20th; 21st
- Decades: 1980s; 1990s; 2000s; 2010s; 2020s
- See also: History of Indonesia; Timeline of Indonesian history; List of years in Indonesia

Events from the year 2007 in Indonesia

== Incumbents ==
President	Vice President
Susilo Bambang Yudhoyono	Jusuf Kalla

== Events ==
=== January ===
- January 1 – Adam Air Flight 574 vanishes over the Makassar Strait, Indonesia.
- January 1 – A speed boat capsized in the coastal area of Java Sea, Central Kalimantan. Fifteen people were killed in this accident.
- January 1 – Whirlwind and landslides hit Lampung.
- January 2 – Floods inundated 107 houses in Sambas, West Kalimantan.
- January 2 – Strong whirlwind hit Bali and Nusa Tenggara, One person was killed, and one temple and three houses were damaged.
- January 3 – Four-meter-high ocean waves destroyed 65 houses on the southern coast of Huangobotu village, Gorontalo.
- January 7 – New mudflow eruption was detected in Kedung Cangkring, Jabon, Sidoarjo, approx. 1.5 km from the first eruption.
- January 9 – Bakri, a local fisherman, found a piece of the tail of the missing Adam Air 574 Boeing 737 in Makassar Strait, 8 km south of Pare Pare, and about 300 m from the shore. The debris is the right tail horizontal stabilizer, Tag Number 65C25746-76. As a result, all of the passengers died.
- January 11 – Following the discovery of the right tail horizontal stabilizer, a life vest and some parts of airline seats had also been found in Pare pare.
- January 12 – Landslide hit the island of Sangihe, North Sulawesi and killed at least 16 people.
- January 13 – President Susilo Bambang Yudhoyono attend the ASEAN Summit in the Philippines.
- January 16 – Indonesian passenger train derailment killed at least five and injured more than a hundred people. The train derailed when passing a bridge in Banyumas, Central Java about 11 km west of Purwokerto, Central Java.
- January 21 – An earthquake measuring 7.5 M_{w} strikes near Sulawesi. The intensity VI (Strong) shock left several people dead and some buildings damaged.

=== February ===
- February 2–February 12: The 2007 Jakarta flood causes 76 fatalities and displaces over 500,000.
- February 21 – Adam Air Flight 172 suffers cracks in the fuselage when landing in Surabaya. Everyone survived, but this was a hard landing.

=== March ===
- March 6 – March 2007 Sumatra earthquakes: A magnitude 6.4 earthquake strikes near Padang in West Sumatra.
- March 7 – Garuda Indonesia Flight 200 overshoots the runway at Adisutjipto International Airport in Yogyakarta, causing the plane to crash into a rice field. 21 of the 40 passengers died.

=== May ===
- May 7–May 13: The 2007 Indonesia Super Series is held in Jakarta.

=== August ===
- August 3 – The Puteri Indonesia of 2007 is held at the Jakarta Convention.
- August 8 – The 2007 Jakarta gubernatorial election is held, resulting in Fauzi Bowo defeating Adang Daradjatun.

=== September ===
- September 12 – 2007 Bengkulu earthquakes: An 8.4 magnitude earthquake occurred along the Sunda megathrust, resulting in 25 deaths and thousands displaced.

== Births ==
- 9 June – Maisha Kanna – Actress, and singer

== See also ==
- History of Indonesia
