= 2008 in Indonesia =

- Centuries: 19th; 20th; 21st
- Decades: 1980s; 1990s; 2000s; 2010s; 2020s
- See also: History of Indonesia; Timeline of Indonesian history; List of years in Indonesia

Events from the year 2008 in Indonesia

== Incumbents ==
President	Vice President
Susilo Bambang Yudhoyono	Jusuf Kalla

== Events ==
- 13 May – Miss Indonesia 2008.
- 5–17 July – 2008 Pekan Olahraga Nasional is held in East Kalimantan.
- 15 August – Puteri Indonesia 2008.
- October – Indonesian Atheists is formed.
- 9 November – Amrozi, Imam Samudra, and Ali Gufron, three men convicted for their roles in the 2002 Bali bombings were executed by firing squad at Nusa Kambangan, Central Java.
- 16 November – 2008 Sulawesi earthquake.
- 19 November – National Committee for West Papua is established.

== Sport ==
- 2008 Indonesia national football team results
- 2007–08 Liga Indonesia Premier Division
- 2008 Indonesian Women's Football Tournament
- 2008 Asian Junior Athletics Championships
- 2008 Thomas & Uber Cup
- 2008 Indonesia Super Series
- 2008 Pekan Olahraga Nasional
- 2008 FIBA Asia Under-18 Championship for Women
- 2008 Asian Beach Games
- Indonesia at the 2008 Asian Beach Games
- Indonesia at the 2008 Summer Olympics
- Indonesia at the 2008 Summer Paralympics
