= 2005 in Indonesia =

- Centuries: 19th; 20th; 21st
- Decades: 1980s; 1990s; 2000s; 2010s; 2020s
- See also: History of Indonesia; Timeline of Indonesian history; List of years in Indonesia

The following lists events that happened during 2005 in Indonesia.

== Incumbents ==
President	Vice President
Susilo Bambang Yudhoyono	Jusuf Kalla

== Events ==
- The Christian Democratic Party is founded.
- The Samudra Raksa Museum is established.
- 2005 Indonesia food scare.

=== January ===
- The first issue of Shōnen Star is published.

=== March ===
- 19 March – Jakarta, Indonesia hosted Miss ASEAN pageant for the 2nd time.
- 28 March – The 8.6 M_{w} Nias–Simeulue earthquake shakes northern Sumatra with a maximum Mercalli intensity of VI (Strong), leaving 915–1,314 people dead and 340–1,146 injured.

=== April ===
- 2 April – 2005 Nias Island Sea King crash.

=== May ===
- 28 May – 2005 Tentena market bombings.

=== August ===
- 18 August – 2005 Java–Bali blackout.

=== September ===
- 5 September – Mandala Airlines Flight 091.

=== October ===
- 1 October – 2005 Bali bombings.
- 30 October – 2005 Indonesian beheadings of Christian girls.

=== December ===
- 31 December – 2005 Palu market bombing.

== Births ==
- 11 January – Dony Tri Pamungkas, footballer.
- 14 January – Toni Firmansyah, footballer.
- 25 January – Meshaal Hamzah, footballer.
- 2 February – Aditya Warman, footballer.
- 3 February – Nashwa Zahira, top 5 in Indonesian Idol season 3.
- 6 February – Muhammad Mishbah, footballer.
- 9 March – Brandon Scheunemann, footballer.
- 14 March – Betrand Peto Putra Onsu, singer.
- 21 March – Marselinus Ama Ola, footballer.
- 4 April – Kadek Arel, footballer.
- 6 April – Fafa Sheva, footballer.
- 7 June -
  - Ibrahim Khalil Alkatiri, actor.
  - Nizam, actor.
- 8 May – Muhammad Ragil, footballer.
- 14 May – Jasmine Nadya, actress and singer.
- 18 June – Adyla Rafa Naura Ayu, actress & singer.
- 25 June – Keiko Warman, actor.
- 7 July – Fatih Unru, stand-up comedian & actor.
- 17 July – Calista Amadea, singer.
- 23 July – Deven Christiandi Putra, runner up in Indonesian Idol season 3.
- 24 July – Amanda Putri Julianti, actress.
- 7 August – Mufli Hidayat, footballer.
- 26 September – Rey Bong, actor.
- 28 September – Yudetra Atala Jinan, actor.
- 18 October – Anneth Delliecia, winner in Indonesian Idol season 3.
- 5 November – Rahmat Syawal, footballer.
- 6 December – Yafi Tesa Zahara, actor.
- 20 December – Arlyansyah Abdulmanan, footballer.
- 25 December – Jefan Nathanio, actor.

== Deaths ==
- 11 January – Hans Wospakrik, physicist.& lecturer in Bandung Institute of Technology.
- 22 February – Kuntowijoyo, writer and academic.
- 23 February – M. Hasan, former chief of the Indonesian National Police & ambassador.
- 20 March – Astini, serial killer.
- 2 April – Ismail Hasan Metareum, politician.
- 5 April – Z.A. Maulani, former chief of the Indonesian State Intelligence Agency.
- 6 April – Abdul Latief, one of the witnesses to the events of the 30 September Movement in 1965.
- 4 May – Purwoto Gandasubrata, the 8th Chief Justice of the Supreme Court of Indonesia.
- 17 May – Simson Tambunan, former coach & manager of the Indonesian boxer who became Indonesia's first world champion, Ellyas Pical.
- 24 May – Mubyarto, populist economy expert who teaches at Gadjah Mada University.
- 26 May – Radius Prawiro, economist & politician.
- 22 June – Mashudi, former Governor of West Java & Chairman of the Scout Movement.
- 28 June -
  - Saleh Afiff, coordinating Minister for the Economy and Finance of Indonesia in the Development Cabinet VI.
  - Eki Syachrudin, diplomat & ambassador.
- 29 June – Roeslan Abdulgani, politician & United Nations ambassador in the Sukarno government during the 1950s and 1960s.
- 21 July – Otteman III Mahmud Ma'amun, the 13th Sultan of Deli.
- 28 July – Saadillah Mursjid, Minister of State Secretary in the Development Cabinet VII.
- 30 July – Singgih, Attorney General of Indonesia in 1990–1998.
- 6 August -
  - Sumiskum, politician.
  - Andi Abdul Muis, communication science expert and Indonesian press freedom fighter.
- 16 August – Eddy Sud, famous actor in 1960s.
- 27 August – Ruben Gunawan, chess Grandmaster.
- 29 August – Nurcholish Madjid, Islamic thinkers & intellectuals.
- 5 September -
  - Raja Inal Siregar, the 13th Governor of North Sumatra.
  - Tengku Rizal Nurdin, the 14th & 15th Governor of North Sumatra.
- 18 September – Mus K. Wirya, songwriter.
- 9 November – Perry Pattiselanno, jazz musicians.
- 19 December – Jacobus Perviddya Solossa, Governor of Papua in 2000–2005.
- 25 December – Sriwati Masmundari, an artist & famous as damar kurung painter.
