= 2006 in Indonesia =

- Centuries: 19th; 20th; 21st
- Decades: 1980s; 1990s; 2000s; 2010s; 2020s
- See also: History of Indonesia; Timeline of Indonesian history; List of years in Indonesia

Events from the year 2006 in Indonesia

== Incumbents ==
President	Vice President
Susilo Bambang Yudhoyono	Jusuf Kalla

== Events ==
- Museum Pasifika is founded.
- March 27: Newspaper Rakyat Merdeka publishes a cartoon depicting the Australian prime minister and foreign minister as copulating dingoes in response to the West Papuan refugee crisis
- May: Sidoarjo mud flow
- May 27: 2006 Yogyakarta earthquake
- July 17: 2006 Pangandaran earthquake and tsunami
- October 8: 2006 Southeast Asian haze
- November 6 – 9: The Yogyakarta Principles are developed and signed.
- December 11: Acehnese gubernatorial election, 2006

== Births ==
- November 18 – Harleyava Princy, Indonesian actress and singer

== Sport ==
- 2006 Indonesia national football team results
- 2006 Copa Indonesia final
- 2006 Liga Indonesia Premier Division
- 2006 Indonesia Open
- Indonesia at the 2006 Asian Games
