= 2003 Aceh New Year's Eve bombing =

Indonesian terrorist attack

- Location: Peureulak, Nanggroe Aceh Darussalam, Indonesia
- Date: 31 December 2003; 10:20 p.m. (UTC+7)
- Target: New Year's Eve festival
- Attack type: Improvised explosive device
- Deaths: 10
- Injuries: 45
- Perpetrator: Suspected Free Aceh Movement separatists

The 2003 Aceh New Year's Eve bombing was a terrorist attack that occurred on 31 December 2003 in Peureulak, Nanggroe Aceh Darussalam province, Indonesia. The bombing, which occurred during a concert at a night market, killed at least 10 people, including three children, and wounded 45 others

The attack was the deadliest in Aceh since the start of hostilities between Indonesian troops and the Free Aceh Movement (GAM) on 19 May 2003. The Indonesian military blamed GAM, but GAM denied responsibility for the bombing.

== The attack ==
The bomb, thought to have been triggered by a timer mechanism, detonated around 9:00 PM at a night market in the eastern town of Peureulak. According to first responders, the device had been planted beneath a stage, where three local girls were performing.

The New Year's Eve festival, attended by hundreds, was allegedly organised by the military. Of the victims, many were teenagers and children; the victims included a 1-year-old girl and a 7-year-old boy who died at the scene, as well as a 4-year-old girl who died in the hospital. Other victims included the mother of two of the children, numerous teenagers, as well as a man later identified as member of GAM. The majority of casualties were treated in Langsa general hospital, which lacked enough surgeons to operate on injured victims; they requested more doctors be sent from the provincial capital Banda Aceh and the North Sumatran city of Medan to supplement them.

Lt. Col. Ahmad Yani Basuki of the Indonesian military described the bomb as powerful and stated that no group but GAM could have staged such an attack, describing Peureulak as a "rebel stronghold". However, a spokesman for GAM denied responsibility, stating the separatist group had never staged an attack to kill Acehnese. Due to a victim being a member of GAM, local police investigated the possibility of a suicide attack; findings were inconclusive. At the time, the Free Aceh Movement separatists had no history of targeting civilians or public bombings.
