= Angel's Diary =

- Created by: TRANS TV, Limelight Entertainment
- Written by: Tary Lestari, Key Mangunsong, Budhita, Eka Kurniawan, Raha Kurnia
- Directed by: Omar Aly Adly, Thaleb Wirachman
- Starring: Angelica Faustina; Dimas Aditya; Kiki Rizky; Dhanya Nilawati; Rita Hasan; Zoffy Melza Ibrahim; Zaneta Georgina; Mathias Muchus
- Country of origin: Indonesia

Production
- Executive producer: Emilka
- Producer: Harli Rusdiantoro
- Editors: Doni Sumantri and team
- Running time: 30 minutes

Original release
- Network: Trans TV
- Release: 21 October 2009

Angel's Diary is a soap opera drama that aired on the Trans TV every day Monday through Friday. Angel's Diary claimed as a new presence in Indonesia with high drama editing and shooting classes with wide-screen movies.

== Cast ==
- Angelica Faustina as Angelique Smith Ferguson
- Dimas Aditya as Satria
- Kiki Rizky as Ryan
- Dhanya Nilawati as Poppy
- Rita Hasan as Rita Wibowo
- Zoffy Melza Ibrahim as Zoppy
- Mathias Muchus as Satria's Father

== Synopsis ==
=== Season 1 ===
Angel (Angelica Faustina) is a 19-year-old Australian-Indonesian young woman (her mother is a native of Indonesia while her father is an Australian) who had lived in Australia for 10 years. When her family finds out that she is dating a member of an Australian band, Angel is ordered to live in Jakarta, Indonesia in fear of the negative influences surrounding her relationship. In Jakarta, Angel lives with her fastidious and sassy aunt, Rita Wibowo (Rita Hasan) and her impish and rude young cousin, Zoppy (Zoffy Melza Ibrahim). Due to culture shock, Angel has to adapt to a completely different environment not only in her new campus but also in Jakarta in general. In the midst of these difficulties, she always carries a laptop to write and vent her experiences in her personal blog.

In her new university, Angel becomes best friends with Poppy (Dhanya Nilawati), who helps Angel in adjusting her life. She also gets into conflict with the arrogant and very rich fellow student, Nadia (Sally Adelia), and her assistant, Carolina (Zaneta Georgina), who often bully Angel and Poppy. Angel also meets and becomes attracted to Satria (Dimas Aditya), an aloof male student who once offers her a handkerchief to clean herself after a round of bully from Nadia and helps her fixing her laptop. While Satria at first ignores Angel, he cools over his demeanor over time. In the meantime, Angel becomes the target of affection from Nadia's boyfriend, Ryan (Kiki Rizky), after initially teasing her. However, after several conflicts with both Angel and Nadia and the fact that Angel ultimately does not love him, Ryan exiles himself to the countryside to rethink about himself. After Ryan's departure, Angel becomes even more closer to Satria, who slowly realizes he has fallen in love with her; this earns contempt from Carolina as she is in love with Satria. During a fatal prank from Nadia and Carolina, Angel is badly injured when she falls off the stairs and enters a coma. A great deal of anguish ensues between people close to Angel, including Satria, whose professes his love to Angel right before she wakes up. Angel learns from her mother who came from Australia that she is a foster child; her biological mother, Maya, is still alive and currently living somewhere in Jakarta; however, Angel cannot find her despite her extensive search. She does, however, learn that she shares the same maternal grandparents as Nadia, making them cousins; this horrifies Nadia over all the things she has done to Angel.

Meanwhile, a new male student, the cheerful and protective Andhika (Roby Sutanto), appears to complicate Angel and Satria's relationship, as Angel falls in love with and dates Andhika. Carolina, teaming up with Nadia's mother who wants Angel dead to prevent her from receiving her father's will, sets up a complex plan to kidnap Angel, which leads to Andhika being mortally wounded and died during his attempt to rescue her, right after the campus graduation. Carolina also forces Satria to marry her by falsely accusing him of making her pregnant. However, Angel and Nadia's grandfather is revealed to have left most of his fortune to Angel in his will, making Nadia's mother mad and declared insane. Satria also sees through Carolina's lie and quickly leaves her to meet Angel, who decides to return to Australia after graduation, depressed over Andhika's death. Meeting her in Andhika's grave, he convinces her to stay as well as promising Andhika that he will take care of Angel. Convinced, Angel decides to stay and start a relationship with Satria.

=== Season 2 ===
Angel starts a new life after graduation in her luxurious house left to her by her grandfather's will. She occupies the house with Poppy, while her aunt and cousin, Rita and Zoppy respectively, visit her occasionally to "loot" her food. She is also in a relationship with Satria. Angel eventually finds a job at a magazine company, but she has to fend herself from her old nemesis, Carolina, who also works at the same office and wants to crush Angel's life.
