= Bloom Agro =

- Type: Private
- Genre: Natural foods; Organic Rice; SRI Rice; Fair Trade
- Founded: 2009
- Founder: Emily Sutanto
- Headquarters: Jakarta, Java, ID
- Subsidiaries: Sunria
- Website: bloomagro.com

Bloom Agro is an Indonesian social enterprise founded by Emily Sutanto. The company aims to promote sustainable agriculture and improve humanity. It is Indonesia's first organic and fair-trade rice producer and exporter.

Bloom Agro currently works with 2300 small-scale farmers in the Simpatik Farmers Association in Tasikmalaya, West Java, to export their rice that is grown organically with System of Rice Intensification (SRI) methods. Sutanto worked with the farmers to obtain international organic and fair trade certification through IMO and successfully lobbied to exempt specialty rice from Indonesia's rice export ban. She has also revolutionized the supply chain by empowering these farmers so that they do not have to rely on tengkulak anymore.

Within three years of founding Bloom Agro, Sutanto is exporting SRI organic rice including several traditional varieties, to Germany, Malaysia, Singapore, the United Arab Emirates and the United States.

== History ==
After hearing about organic farming practices in Tasikmalaya, West Java, Sutanto took a trip to the region to see the farms. When she arrived, instead of finding well-structured agricultural practices, she met desperate farmers lost in the bureaucratic scuffle of organic certification and export regulations. The farmers are also trapped in endless poverty cycles as the rice market is dominated by unfair practices of tengulak (English: loan shark traders). Inspired by their plateaued dreams, Emily Sutanto decided to take on the challenge and initiates to be the project leader .

== Products ==
Bloom Agro focuses mostly on the export of fair-trade organic rice, its first innovation was the "Volcano Rice", a colorful proprietary blend of brown, pink, and red rice grown in volcanic soil which is rich in many essential minerals; this rice mix is graining popularity in USA and Europe.
