= Effect of the 2004 Indian Ocean earthquake on Indonesia =

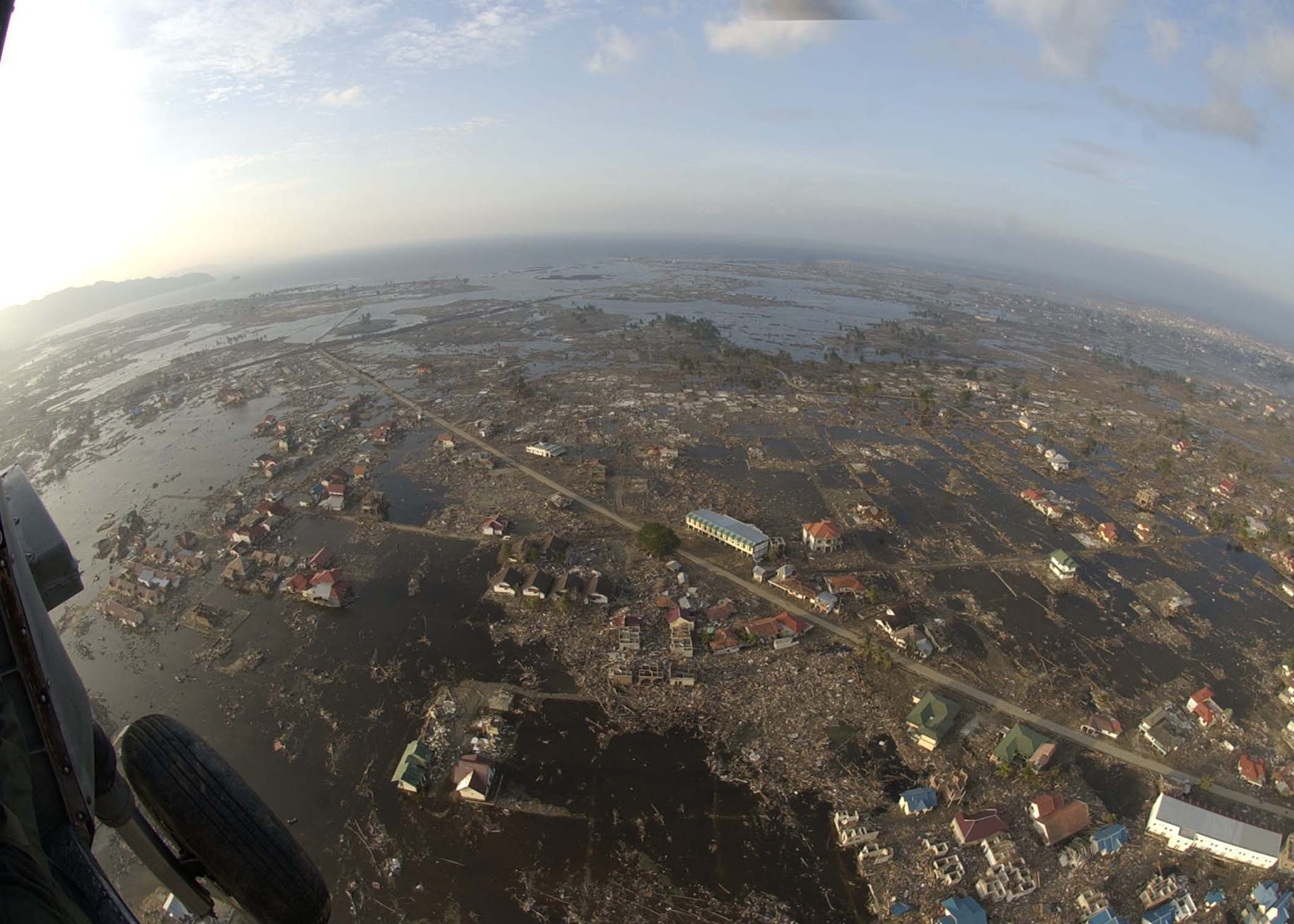
- Aerial view of Banda Aceh on 19 January 2005
- UTC time: 2004-12-26 00:58:53
- ISC event: 7453151
- USGS-ANSS: ComCat
- Local date: 26 December 2004
- Local time: 07:58:53
- Magnitude: 9.2–9.3 M_{w}
- Depth: 30 km (19 mi)
- Epicenter: Sumatra
- Areas affected: Indonesia
- Max. intensity: MMI IX (Violent)
- Casualties: 167,540 dead and missing in Indonesia

Indonesia was the first country to be seriously affected by the 2004 Indian Ocean earthquake and tsunami on 26 December 2004, swamping the northern and western coastal areas of Sumatra, and the smaller outlying islands off Sumatra. Nearly all the casualties and damage took place within the province of Aceh. The time of arrival of the tsunami was between 15 and 30 minutes after the deadly earthquake. According to the country's National Disaster Relief Coordination Agency, around 130,000 people were dead and 37,063 were missing; deaths included 126,602 in Aceh and 130 in North Sumatra. In addition, the UN estimated that 655,000 people were homeless and sheltering in scattered refugee camps across the province.

The tsunami was as high as 51 meters (167 feet) in the area closest to the epicenter of the earthquake. Like most extremely deadly tsunamis, the tsunami was much more destructive than the earthquake that preceded it.

== Aftermath ==
Northern Sumatra took damage from the earthquake itself as the tsunami inundated it. However, most of the damage was the result of the tsunami that struck the coastal regions of the Aceh and to a much lesser extent the North Sumatra provinces. The west coast of Aceh was about 100 km (60 mi) from the epicenter and took very heavy damage as far south as Tapaktuan. The coastal town of Lhoknga was hit by tsunami waves of more than 20 to 25 meters with run-up heights of more than 30 meters in some places. Ten-meter tall waves passed the northern tip of the island to race south down the Straits of Malacca and strike along the northeast coast as far east as Lhokseumawe.

Three days of national mourning were declared. Reports from those who flew over the Aceh coast reported a virtually destroyed coastline. In many towns and villages, concrete pads were all that was left of substantial structures, while scattered corrugated iron roofs crumpled like paper wore the only evidence of weaker homes. Relief efforts and communication along the western coastline were complicated because roads along the coast was disrupted due to the destruction of dozens of bridges and much of the road being washed away or blocked by mud. The western districts of Aceh, lying nearest the epicenter of the magnitude 9.1–9.3 earthquake that caused the tsunami, were a "roadless" area, according to UN Emergency Coordinator Jan Egeland. "The lack of access by road is a key problem aid agencies face in the northern and western parts of Aceh," Chris Lom, a spokesman in the region for the International Organization for Migration, said on 7 January. A number of towns on the west coast were therefore cut off from the road from any airport or port. Relief efforts, therefore, required the use of helicopter or boat. In the town of Meulaboh in Aceh, for instance, where thousands were waiting for aid, 99 percent of the bridges were gone and 60 percent of asphalt roads awash with mud according to Lom. "An escalation in the number of deaths is almost a certainty," according to William Hyde, Jakarta-based emergency relief coordinator for the International Organization for Migration. "So much of the coastline couldn't be accessed."

Government officials in Indonesia acknowledged they were forced to make crude estimates of the death toll because of the scale of the devastation and the breakdown of civil governance. They were forced to use such measures as counting the number of bodies in one mass grave and multiplying that by the number of such plots. In other cases, they estimated the population of a village, counted the survivors and assumed the rest were dead. The scale of the breakdown of civil governance was shown by the fact that after a week 1400 policemen were missing in Aceh, and not reported in. The entire provincial government of Aceh, which had its capital at Banda Aceh was reportedly wiped out by the deaths of the provincial legislators and government workers. UN Secretary-General Kofi Annan described the devastation in the Indonesian province of Aceh as the worst he had ever seen, after touring the region by helicopter on Friday 7 January 2005.

=== Banda Aceh ===
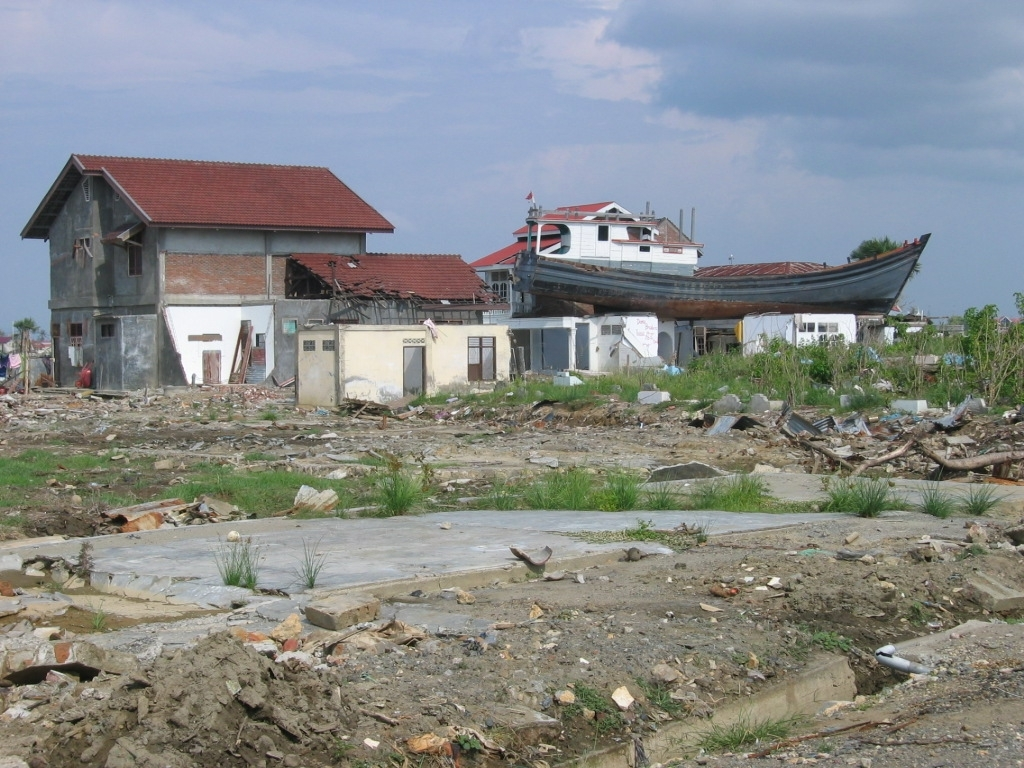
A boat perched atop a house in Aceh after the tsunami

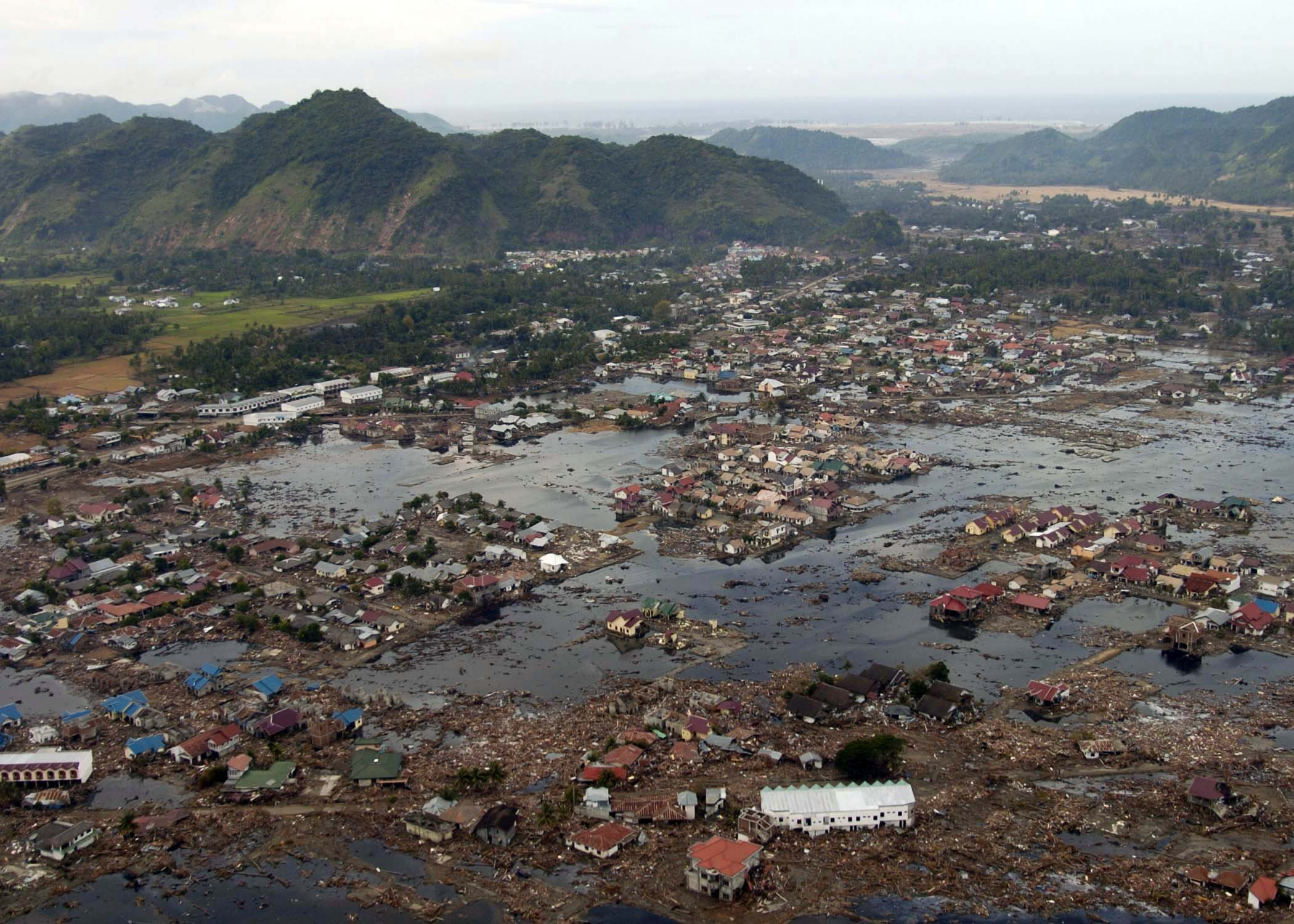
A village near the coast of Sumatra lies in ruin.

Banda Aceh was a city with a population of about 264,000 inhabitants before the tsunami. The majority of the Indonesian casualties were in the city. Around 60,000 people were confirmed killed in the capital of Banda Aceh alone, the government announced. Over one thousand bodies found on the streets in the provincial capital of Banda Aceh were placed in mass graves without waiting for identification as officials quickly tried to keep the sanitation situation from worsening.

=== Leupung ===
Leupung -- sometimes spelt "Leupueng", is a town in the district (Kabupaten/Kota) of Aceh Besar, close to the city of Banda Aceh, the capital of the special territory of Aceh. The town was obliterated by the tsunami. Media reports stated that the tsunami was directed by seaside limestone cliffs towards Leupung, which had a population of ten thousand. According to reports nothing vertical and square-edged is left, and the estimated number of survivors was between 200 and 700.

=== Calang ===
Calang was badly hit by the tsunami. It was the district capital, but little was left remaining. Only about 30 percent of the townspeople survived. Estimates of the population of Calang largely fall between 9,000 and 12,000. The trail of destruction left by the tsunami extended two kilometers inland from the coast. Whole hills were washed away. Welfare Minister Alwi Shihab was quoted as saying that it is likely the town of Calang, north of Meulaboh, would be relocated inland.

=== Meulaboh ===
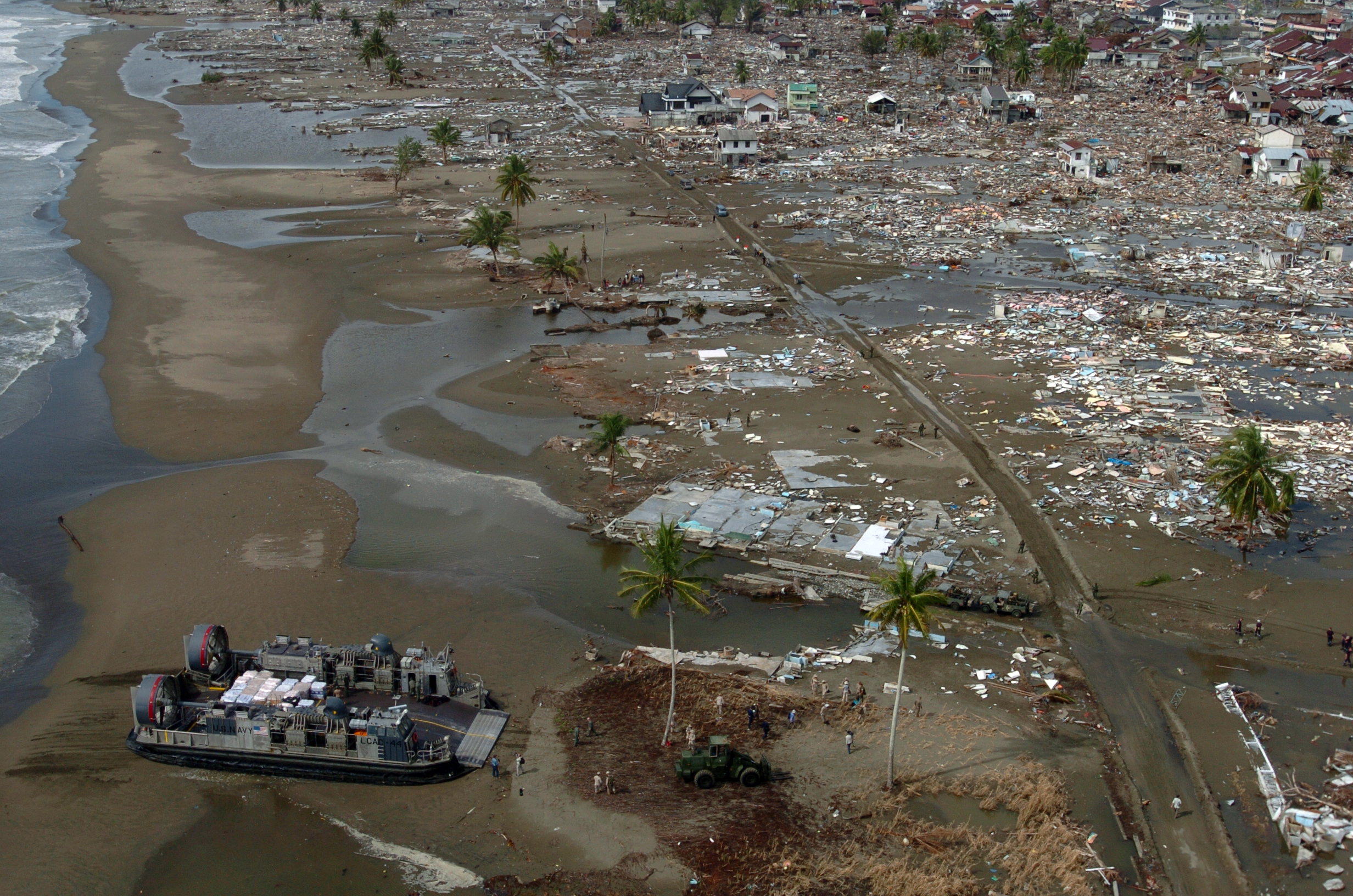
Landing Craft Air Cushion (LCAC) Hovercraft from USS Bonhomme Richard (LHD 6) is delivering materials and supplies needed by the citizens of Meulaboh, Indonesia.

The town of Meulaboh, which had a population of 120,000 before the tsunami, was struck by a series of waves, killing an estimated 40,000 and destroying most parts of the city, according to relief organizers and local government officials. Approximately 50,000 people lost their homes in the region, local government workers seemed to be overwhelmed and there was little sign of coordination with regional authorities. About 5000 took refuge at Meulaboh College but conditions there became steadily worse. An Indonesian Navy ship bringing aid supplies to Meulaboh was forced to turn away after it was unable to dock because the port facilities were destroyed. The small airport nearby was reopened, enabling small aircraft to land there.

=== Western Islands ===
Government officials were initially very concerned over the lack of reports from the many small islands dotting the western coast of Sumatra, such as the islands of Simeulue and Nias, among the poorest areas in Indonesia. However, casualties seemed to be comparatively light in comparison to the mainland of Aceh.

==== Simeulue Island ====
Simeulue was not the tragedy many government officials feared despite its proximity to the quake epicenter. Only five of the 70,000 villagers on Simeulue were killed, all of them in the earthquake, although 90% of the buildings along its coast were destroyed by the tsunami, which reached up to 5 m (16 ft) high. Residents on the island were prompted to evacuate following the earthquake, based on a local oral tradition which emerged following the 1907 earthquake and tsunami. A previous earthquake last struck in 2002.

==== Nias Island ====
On Nias Island official accounts gave the number of dead at 122 via the Ministry of Health, while various unconfirmed sources (mostly from phone calls by relatives living in Jakarta) reported death tolls of over 600; others said the number was more likely to exceed 1000. Reports surfaced that the small islets off the coast of Nias island in the Sirombu district were still relatively intact, but high waves still prevented locals from attempting to reach the islands. Confirmation and communications to the islands were further hampered by damage to telecommunication infrastructures, where phone lines were broken and radio networks were said to be down due to bad weather. This infrastructure damage severely hampered the distribution of aid.

== Complications owing to Aceh insurgency ==
Relief was made difficult due to the insurgency of the separatist movement Free Aceh Movement which means that there were relatively few journalists, government offices, or aid workers in Aceh prior to the earthquake. On 27 December the government lifted the 18-month-old ban prohibiting foreign journalists and aid workers from travelling to Aceh. Also on 27 December a spokesperson for the Free Aceh Movement declared a ceasefire so humanitarian aid could reach survivors, and so as not to complicate the situation, however some expressed doubt that there would be good-faith cooperation between the Free Aceh Movement and the Indonesian military. Despite losing many soldiers to the tsunami, the separatists remained a part of Aceh.

On 6 January the Indonesian military reported that soldiers had been attacked while on humanitarian missions. The insurgents in turn claimed that the Indonesian military took advantage of the situation. If the clashes continued, it would pose a problem for humanitarian organizations operating outside of the cities near rebel strongholds. Travel restrictions may be put on foreigners again if the conflict restarts. U.S. Secretary of State Colin Powell warned Indonesia not to use any of the military aid being provided for relief efforts for counterinsurgency efforts.

== Effects ==
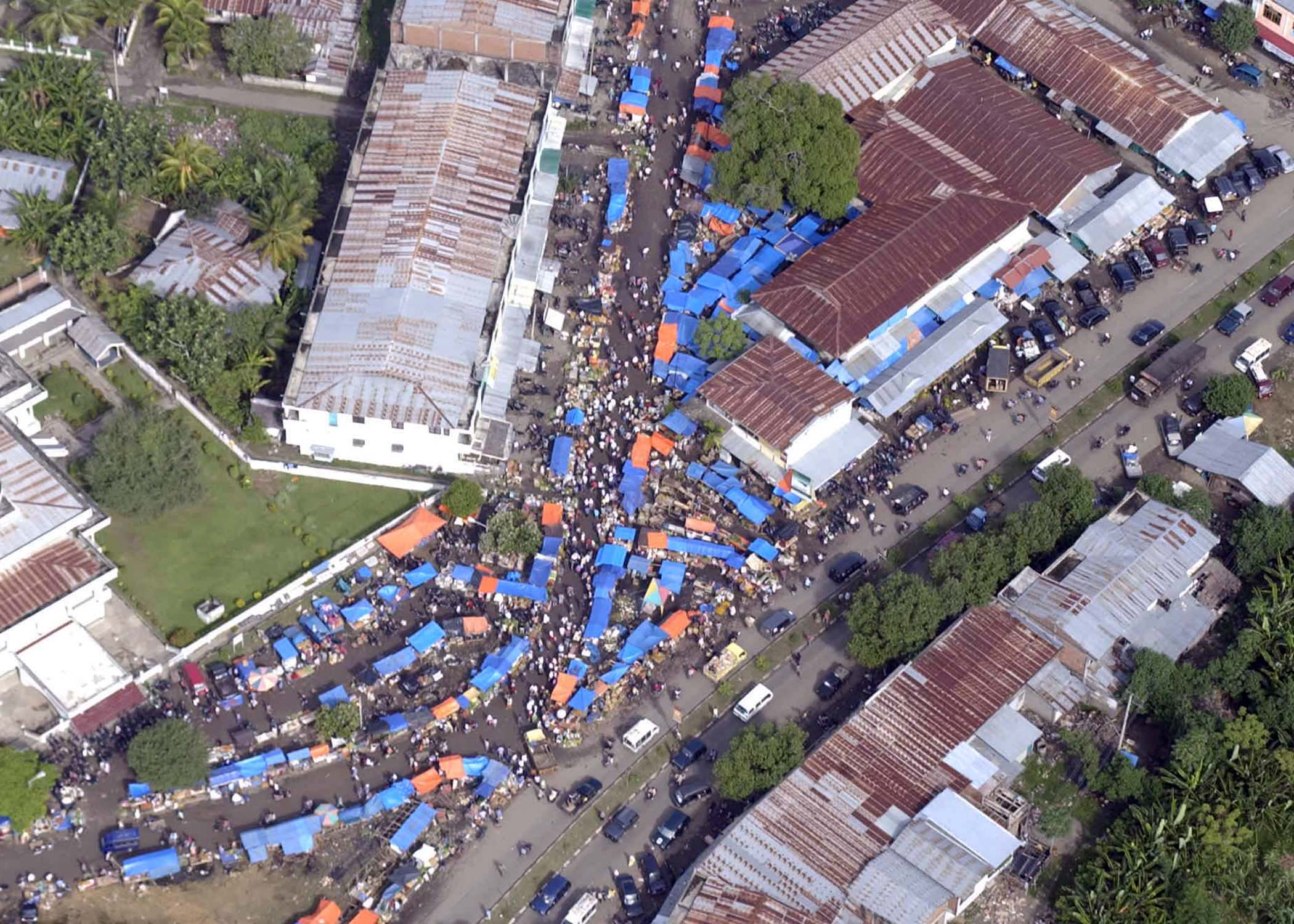
Aerial view of new village in Banda Aceh to house people left homeless by the tsunami

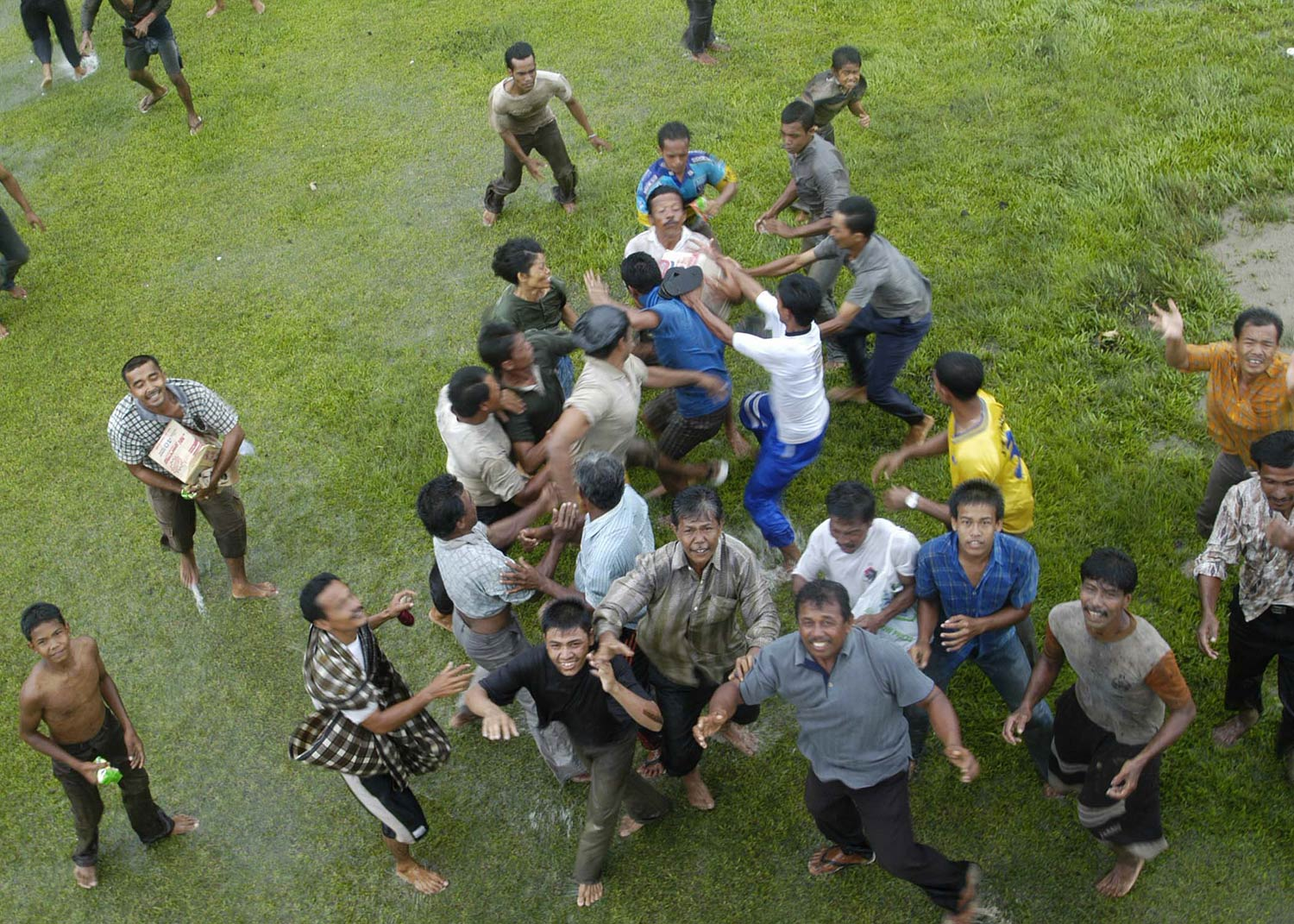
Indonesian tsunami victims gather under an approaching US helicopter to receive food and supplies.

Although Indonesia was the first and worst hit of countries in the region, it was the last to begin receiving relief aid. Looting of food was reported throughout this northmost province of Sumatra as aid proved slow to arrive.

Fifteen thousand troops, who were in the region to fight the insurgency, were dispatched to render assistance and to search for survivors. However, many soldiers and their families were themselves killed. The Indonesian government declared the local provincial Acehnese government as totally crippled (many local politicians based in Banda Aceh were killed when the tsunami struck the city) and declared that all administrative control would be handled directly from Jakarta.

The unmanageably high number of corpses strewn all over the cities and countrysides, limited resources and time for identifying bodies, and the very real threat of cholera, diphtheria and other diseases prompted emergency workers to create makeshift mass graves. One of the most urgently required supplies were bodybags.

There were significant bottlenecks created by lack of infrastructure and red tape. The United Nations' Children's Fund reported on Thursday that aid for 200,000 people, including medical supplies, soap and tarpaulin, was being held at Jakarta for a day to clear customs. There were reports that aid was piling up at the airports of Medan and Banda Aceh because there were not enough trucks to transport it. Eleven days after the disaster few foreign relief workers or supplies reached the local people in local centres such as Meulaboh, Aceh.

In the immediate aftermath, one of the most pressing concerns was the inability to distribute sufficient aid due to a lack of accessible roads and a shortage of available helicopters. What little aid reached the remote regions of Aceh province trickled in primarily by boat and air. While the airfield outside Banda Aceh was functioning, most of the other small gravel airfields were damaged by the earthquake and tsunami. In the first days only two airfields were functioning in the province. As most of the few roads in the region were on the coast because of the rugged interior, much of the transport infrastructure was damaged or destroyed. Four planes carrying aid were sent by Australia and one from the US carrying an evaluation team. An Australian ship carrying helicopters set sail, but did not reach Sumatra until 14 January 2005. A US Navy aircraft carrier battle group centred on USS Abraham Lincoln, dispatched to assist Aceh, began ferrying small amounts of supplies to the remnants of small coastal communities. The US relief operation was based at the Thai base of Utapao.

== See also ==
- 2006 Yogyakarta earthquake
- 2006 Pangandaran earthquake and tsunami
