= Murder of Muhammad Naufal Zidan =

2023 murder in Indonesia

- Location: Depok, West Java, Indonesia
- Date: 2 August 2023; 3 years ago 18:30 pm
- Attack type: Stabbing
- Weapon: Knife
- Deaths: 1
- Victim: Muhammad Naufal Zidan
- Perpetrator: Altafasalya Ardnika Basya
- Motive: Theft
- Charges: Death sentence

On 2 August 2023, Muhammad Naufal Zidan, a second year University of Indonesia student, was murdered at his dorm room in Kukusan, Beji.

== Background ==
Muhammad Naufal Zidan was born on 13 July 2004 in Lumajang, East Java, the son of Shohibi Arif and Elvira Rustina. He went to the Faculty of Humanities at University of Indonesia, majoring in Russian literature, in 2022.

== Murder and investigation ==
On 2 August 2023 at 6:30 PM, Zidan was escorted to his lodge house by his senior, Altafasalya Ardnika Basya. After arriving at Zidan's room, Basya took a penknife from the seat of his motorbike and put it in his trouser pocket. The two of them then chatted until Basya pretended he wanted to go home and then took a penknife from his pocket and stabbed Zidan.

Zidan tried to fight back by biting Basya's hand but was stabbed in the neck and chest repeatedly until he died. Basya then looked for plastic to put Zidan's body in and then spread camphor to get rid of the blood smell and then put Zidan's body under the bed. He later stole Zidan's MacBook, wallet, and iPhone, before leaving the murder location.

Zidan's family tried to contact him but had no response. They later sought help from a lodge house owner to check Zidan's condition, who said that his room was empty, and his family later thought that Zidan was with his friend.

After not being able to be contacted again the next day, Zidan's family sent his uncle, Teguh Setiadji, to check his condition on 4 August at 9.15 am. His uncle then came to the lodge house and found his room locked, and later asked the lodge house's owner to open it. They found the room in a messy condition with some camphor and found Zidan's body wrapped under the bed. His uncle later ran outside and called the police.

Zidan's body was later taken to the National Police Hospital in Kramat Jati, East Jakarta, for an autopsy.

== Arrest ==
Police arrested 23-year-old University of Indonesia student, Altafasalya Ardnika Basya, who was Zidan's senior, three hours after his body was found. Basya had been dealing with an academic decline after facing problems while investing in cryptocurrency. He allegedly suffered a loss of up to Rp. 80 million in crypto investment instruments as a result of guessing the wrong coin price. He later confessed his difficulty in finding a loan to replace his losses and pay his rent. Zidan's belongings were found at his house.

He said at the start he had no intention of wanting to kill Zidan, but then this intention appeared when he escorted Zidan to his lodge house. In a press conference the police revealed that Basya was also trying to hack Zidan's bank account and that they were seeking to charge him with the death penalty.

Before the murder, Basya resided at Wisma Ladika in Kukusan, Beji, not far from Zidan's lodge house and still in the same urban village. He was known for his humble and jovial personality with his friends according to Wisma Ladika's owner.

== Reactions ==
University of Indonesia expressed their condolences for Zidan's death on 4 August 2023 and handed over his case to the police. The Chairman of the University of Indonesia Student Executive Board, Melki Sedek Huang, expressed his condolences on Instagram, followed by the Chairman of the University of Indonesia Student Executive Board of the Faculty of Humanities, Muhammad Husni.

Many Indonesian internet users responding to this case said that the rectorate of the University of Indonesia must immediately carry out an evaluation, and a few others compared this case to the death case of Akseyna, a biology student at University of Indonesia whose case has remained unresolved since 2015. Some internet users also said that death cases among University of Indonesia students have recently become common and compared Zidan's case to the suicide of a 21-year-old University of Indonesia student in March 2023.

Wisma Ladika's owner, Sunarsih, said that she was in shock and did not expect that Basya whom she considered as her own son could commit a murder. She said that she fainted when she saw the police come to arrest Basya at her lodge house but also feels grateful because the murder did not happen at her place, and added that she felt scared after knowing that Basya is the suspect.
