= Boni Avibus =

Indonesian dramatist, actress and poet

Sigrid Minerva Boni Avibus
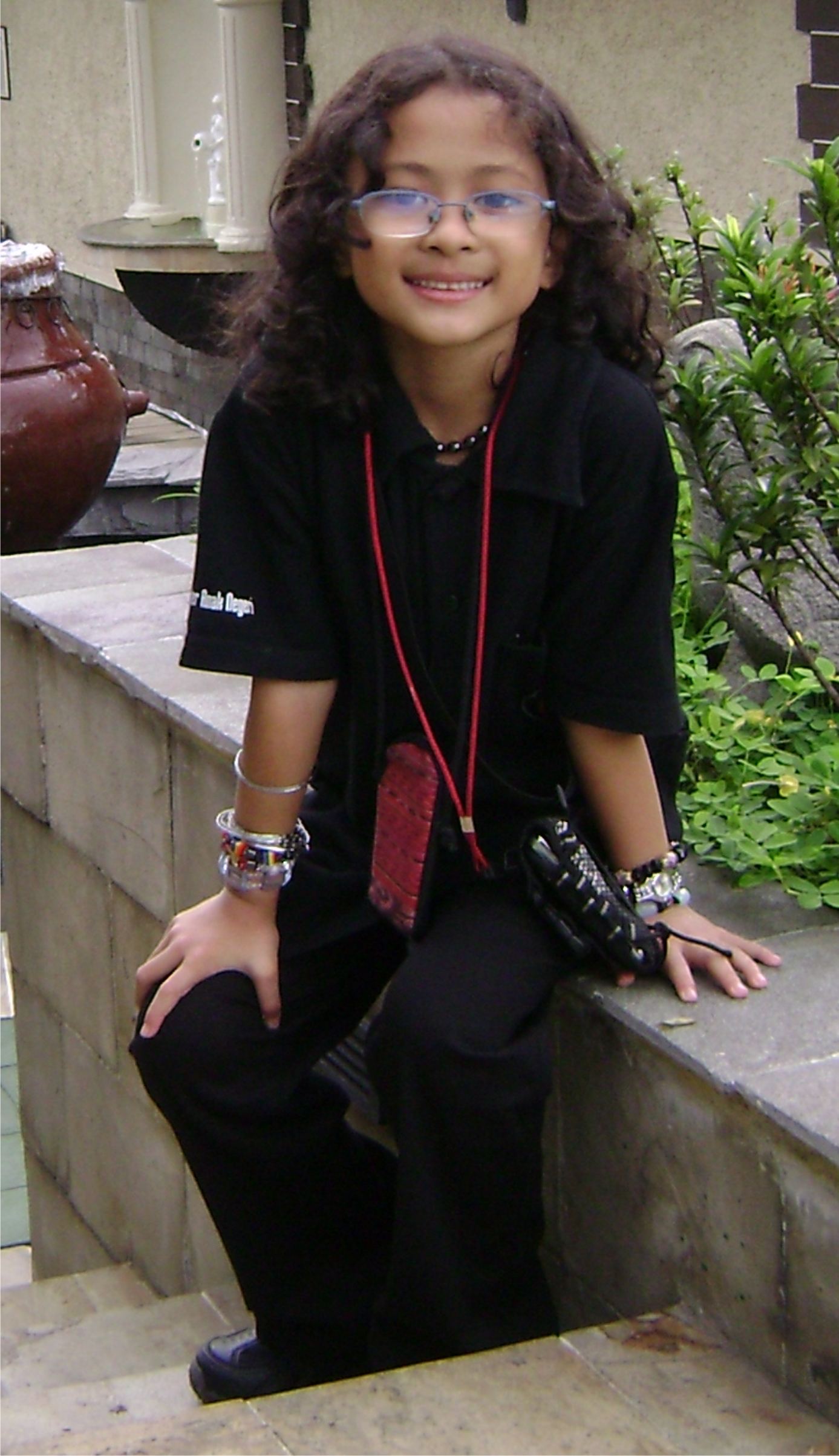
- Avibus in 2011
- Born: Sigrid Minerva Boni Avibus; September 14, 2002 (age 23); Bandung, West Java, Indonesia
- Other names: Boni Avibus; Boni Sigrid; Sigrid
- Occupations: Actor, Poets, Student
- Years active: 2008 - present
- Office: Daya Cipta Budaya
- Website: Official Website

Sigrid Minerva Boni Avibus (born September 14, 2002) widely known as Boni Avibus is an Indonesian dramatist, poet, activist, theater performer, actress and orator.

== Early life and career beginnings ==
Sigrid was born in Bandung, West Java, Indonesia. She had experienced rejection when she want to study in formal and non formal schools because of her age are considered not sufficient by education regulations in 2006. In an effort to find a school, then there is a primary headmaster who is interested in her ability to speak expressed a desire, she then get a guarantee to be able to attend school. She had another obstacle to be involved in activities outside of school until then a community of theater run by Yusef Muldiyana allow her to watch the process of theatrical practice. This opportunity opened the way to art after she showed her ability to adapt with the cast of a work which will be staged on theater script Ignatius. She's theatrical performances for eventually making her known by some cultural observer and local theater communities whom recommended her to bring culture speech at anniversary of Indonesia Theater Federation 2008 in Graha Bhakti Budaya Taman Ismail Marzuki, Jakarta and introduce her to the bureaucrats, cultural observer and national artists.

The celebration was the starting point for her single performance in various public spaces that made her known as Indonesia's youngest theater artist. She invited to make a speech at the convention of independent candidates for president of Indonesia in the 2009 elections. Renowned Indonesian author like Putu Wijaya wrote a monologue manuscript for her perform at Indonesia's Theater Rostrum # 2 in Surakarta in October 2010.

In mid of 2009, Sigrid to be ones who inspiring the founding of Teater Anak Negeri which introduced the art of theater, culture, workgroup, personal management and leadership from an early age in the general public and provide direct motivation in children that age.

== Activism ==
=== Philanthropy ===
In addition to being an actress, Sigrid is also a philanthropist. She is known for her contribution towards Daya Cipta Budaya a non-profit organizations in the form of donations as well as fund-raising activities since the establishment of Teater Anak Negeri as one of the programs and facilities of Daya Cipta Budaya campaign.

In the activity of Teater Anak Negeri, Sigrid were also involved as activists, and to be the inspiration for the children to understand about personal management, workgroup, leadership and raise awareness about preserving the environment for sustainable living.

== Awards ==
- Best Female Actor in Supporting Role in BMA (Bandung Movie Award) 2009 (June 2009).
- Declarator of Archipelago Culture Day; Gedung Indonesia Menggugat. November 7, 2009.
- First prize of Sundanesse Poetry Contest of Great Bandung Elementary School Level (February 2010).

== Sources ==
- Boni Avibus, The Youngest Indonesian President Candidat 2009
- Best female actor in supporting role at BMA 2009
- A Monologue for Rendra
- Indonesia's Theater Rostrum
- Boni Avibus work on Putu Wijaya monologue manuscript
