= Bagong Kussudiardja =

- Born: 9 October 1928; Yogyakarta, Dutch East Indies
- Died: 15 June 2004 (aged 75); Yogyakarta, Indonesia
- Education: Gusti Pangeran Hario Tejokusumo
- Known for: Dance and choreography, painting
- Movement: Modern dance
- Spouse(s): Sofiana (died year 1997); Yuli Sri Hastuti

Bagong Kussudiardja (also spelled Kussudiardjo; 9 October 1928 – 15 June 2004) was an Indonesian artist, contemporary dance choreographer and painter. Bagong's career kicked off after Indonesia's independence in 1945. As a dance choreographer, Bagong created more than 200 dances. Bagong perfected his skills by studying Japanese and Indian dance. In 1957 and 1958, Bagong trained under the well-known dance choreographer Martha Graham, known for her boundary-breaking techniques. Bagong then combined modern moves with traditional Indonesian dances. After his training, he founded Pusat Latihan Tari Bagong Kussudiardja (Bagong Kussudiardja Center for Dance) in 1958, followed by Padepokan Seni Bagong Kussudiardja (Bagong Kussudiardja Center for the Arts) in 1978.

== Dance choreographer ==
Bagong started his career as a classical Javanese dancer in Yogyakarta in 1954. He received his training in the Kredo Bekso Wiromo classical Javanese dance training center. Kredo Bekso Wiromo was established in 1918 by Gusti Pangeran Hario Tejokusumo.

From mid-1957 to 1958, Bagong trained under Martha Graham, a well-known dance choreographed whose technique was still widely used in contemporary dances around the world. This particular training was a Rockefeller Foundation funded study. After his return, Bagong founded the Dance Training Center (Pusat Latihan Tari) Bagong Kussudiardja on March 5, 1958. Much later, Bagong founded the Bagong Kussudiardja Center for the Arts (Padepokan Seni Bagong Kussudiardja) on October 2, 1978.

In December 1984, Bagong embarked on a five-month trip to seven European countries. Together with 14 dancers, he held dance performances, seminars, workshops, batik exhibitions, and batik painting demonstrations. On the National Awakening Day in Jakarta, May 20, 1985, he performed the Indonesian Historical Track Parade, supported by 710 dancers and extras. A month later, Bagong and 100 dancers performed on the coast of Parangtritis, south of Yogyakarta. His dance performance was entitled Kita Perlu Berpaling ke Alam dan Bersujud pada-Nya (We Need to Turn to Nature and Prostrate to It).

The following month he performed the Gema Nusantara, Igel-igelan, and Ratu Kidul dance in Malaysia together with 15 dancers. On 5 October 1985 in Jakarta, he performed the Pawai Lintasan Sejarah ABRI (Parade of the ABRI History), a dance performance inspired from wayang beber, involving 8,000 artists, military personnel, veterans, and hansips.

In 1985, Bagong received an honor from the Pope Paul VI for his fragment Perjalanan Yesus Kristus (The Journey of Jesus Christ).

=== Dances ===
Over the course of his life, Bagong choreographed more than 200 dances; among them were tari layang-layang ("kite dance", in 1954), tari satria tangguh ("the strong noble"), Kebangkitan dan Kelahiran Isa Almasih ("the Ascension and the Birth of Jesus", 1968), and Bedaya Gendeng (1980s). He made performances and films for Christmas, the Crucifixion, and the Ascension.

== Other careers ==
Bagong introduced the art of contemporary batik painting. In 1980, his paintings were exhibited in Dacca, Bangladesh and he received a gold medal from the Bangladeshi government. Bagong was also an actor and starred in a couple of Indonesian movies e.g. Kugapai Cintamu (I'm Reaching for Your Love; 1977).

== Family ==
Bagong was born to a Christian family. He is the son of RB Tjondro Sentono, a wayang painter and a Javanese script scribe, and Siti Aminah. Bagong is the second child of four siblings, the eldest being Kus Sumarbirah, the younger Handung Kussudyarsana, and the youngest Lilut Kussudyarto. He grew up in poverty, so he had to do various jobs to support himself and his family, such as working for a workshop and becoming a coach for a horse-drawn cart.

Bagong is the father of two veteran Indonesian actors Butet Kertaradjasa and Djaduk Ferianto.

== Popular culture ==
The 89th birthday of Bagong Kussudiardja was celebrated by Google Indonesia with a doodle.

== Cited works ==
- Darto Harnoko; Tashadi (1991). Mengenal seniman tari dan karawitan Jawa (in Indonesian). Jakarta: Departemen Pendidikan dan Kebudayaan, Direktorat Jenderal Kebudayaan, Balai Kajian Sejarah dan Nilai Tradisional.
- Lindsay, Jennifer (2012). Heirs to World Culture: Being Indonesian, 1950-1965. BRILL. ISBN 9789004253513.
