= Timeline of Indonesian history =

== 4th century BCE ==
| Year | Date | Event |
|---|---|---|
| 400 BCE | | The prehistoric clay pottery Buni culture (near present-day Bekasi) flourished in coastal northern West Java. |

== 2nd century BCE ==
| Year | Date | Event |
|---|---|---|
| 200 BCE | | "Dvipantara" or "Yawadvipa", a mystic Hindu kingdom is mentioned in India's earliest epic, the Ramayana; Sugriva, the chief of Rama's army dispatched his men to Yawadvipa in search of Sita then later used by the Indianized islander of Java Island and kingdom of Portugal to name the island during the age of discovery. |

== 1st century BCE ==
| Year | Date | Event |
|---|---|---|
| 65 BCE | | A footprint of a kingdom in Java island according to Chinese records. |

== 4th century CE ==
| Year | Date | Event |
|---|---|---|
| 350 | | The Kutai Martadipura phase in East Kalimantan produced the earliest known stone inscriptions in Indonesia. |

== 5th century CE ==
| Year | Date | Event |
|---|---|---|
| 450 | | Several stone inscriptions were created in West Java. Among others, the Tugu inscription announce decrees of Purnavarman, the king of Tarumanagara, one of the earliest Indianized kingdom in Java. |

== 7th century ==
| Year | Date | Event |
|---|---|---|
| 664 | | A Tang dynasty Chinese source written by I-tsing, mentioned about Holing (Kalingga) kingdom, located somewhere on the northern coast of Central Java. |
| 671 | | I-tsing visited Srivijaya and Malayu in Sumatra and Kedah in Malay peninsula on his way to Nalanda, India. |
| 683 | | Dapunta Hyang Sri Jayanasa performed Siddhayatra as the journey to expand his influence. The event is mentioned in several inscriptions such as Telaga Batu inscription, Talang Tuwo inscription, and Kedukan Bukit Inscription. The beginning of Srivijaya hegemony over the maritime region around Malacca Strait and Sunda Strait. |
| 686 | | Srivijaya launch naval invasion against Java, mentioned in Kota Kapur Inscription. Probably contributed to the end of Tarumanagara kingdom. |
| 687 | | I-tsing returned to Srivijaya on his way back from India to China. In his record he reported that the kingdom of Malayu was captured by Srivijaya. |
| 700 | | The Sumatra-based Srivijaya naval kingdom flourishes. |
| 700 | | Wet-field rice cultivation, small towns and kingdoms flourish. Trade links are established with China and India. |
| 700 | | Sojomerto inscription possibly dated around late 7th century discovered in Batang Regency, Central Java, mentioned about Dapunta Selendra, possibly the ancestor of Shailendra dynasty. The inscription was written in old Malay suggested Srivijayan link to this family. |

== 8th century ==
| Year | Date | Event |
|---|---|---|
| 718 | | Sri Indravarman King of Srivijaya send a letter to the Caliph Umar bin Abdul Aziz of the Umayyad Caliphate in Damascus, signing early ancient Indonesian official contact with Islamic world in the Middle East. |
| 732 | | The Sanjaya dynasty is founded around this time according to the Canggal inscription. |
| 752 | | The Hindu Mataram kingdom flourishes. |
| 760 | | The construction of Borobudur started. |
| 770s to 780s | | Java launched series of naval raids on ports of Dai Viet, Champa and Cambodia; Sontay in Tonkin (767); Nha Trang (774); captured Indrapura in Cambodia (770); Phan Rang (787). The naval raids was probably launched by Shailendran-Srivijayan Maharaja Dharmasetu or Dharanindra. |
| 778 | | Kalasan temple constructed according to Kalasan inscription. |
| 792 | | The Manjusrigrha (Sewu) temple is completed according to Manjusrigrha inscription. |
| 800 | | The agriculturally based Buddhist Shailendra dynasty rules Sumatra and Java. |

== 9th century ==
| Year | Date | Event |
|---|---|---|
| 825 | | Borobudur is completed during the reign of Samaratungga. |
| 856 | | Prambanan is completed. According to Shivagrha inscription Rakai Pikatan — the husband of Pramodhawardhani — defeated Balaputra. |
| 860 | | Balaputra the Maharaja of Suvarnadvipa and the ruler of Srivijaya, constructs the buddhist temple and monastery in Nalanda India, on the land given by King Devapaladeva of Pala in Benggala, according to the Nalanda inscription. |

== 10th century ==
| Year | Date | Event |
|---|---|---|
| 907 | | Sumbing volcano erupted, according to Rukam inscription. |
| 907 | | King Balitung created Mantyasih inscription containing the list of Mataram kings, moved the capital from Mamratipura to Poh Pitu, and expanded Prambanan temple. |
| 914 | | The Warmadewa dynasty rules Bali. |
| 928 | | During the reign of King Wawa, the capital of Mataram in Mamratipura was devastated, probably by the massive eruption of Mount Merapi. |
| 929 | | Mpu Sindok moved the seat of power of the Mataram kingdom from Mamratipura in Central Java to Tamwlang in East Java and established Isyana Dynasty. The shift was probably as a result of the eruption of Mount Merapi and/or invasion from Srivijaya. |
| 937 | | Mpu Sindok moved the capital again from Tamwlang to Watugaluh, both near bank of Brantas River in modern Jombang in East Java. |
| c. 980s | | Dynastic marriage between princess Mahendradatta of Javanese Isyanas and king Udayana of Balinese Warmadewas. |
| 990 | | King Dharmawangsa of Mataram kingdom launches a naval invasion on Palembang in an unsuccessful attempt to conquer Srivijaya. |
| 990 | | Airlangga, son of King Udayana and Queen Mahendradatta was born in Bali. |
| 996 | | Dharmawangsa commissioned the translation of the Mahabharata into Old Javanese. |

== 11th century ==
| Year | Date | Event |
|---|---|---|
| 1006 | | Srivijaya successfully repelling the Dharmawangsa's invasion, the invasion ultimately unsuccessful. |
| 1016 | | King Dharmawangsa's Mataram kingdom falls under invasion of King Wurawari from Lwaram (highly possible Srivijayan ally in Java). |
| 1019 | | Airlangga establishes the Kingdom of Kahuripan. |
| 1025 | | Rajendra Chola, the Chola king from Cholamandala in South India, conquered Pannai and Kadaram from Srivijaya and occupied it for some time. The Cholas continued a series of raids and conquests of parts Srivijayan empire in Sumatra and Malay Peninsula. |
| 1030 | | Sanghyang Tapak inscription in the Cicatih River bank in Cibadak, Sukabumi, West Java, mentioned about the establishment of sacred forest and Kingdom of Sunda. |
| 1041 | | Airlangga divided Kahuripan into two kingdoms Janggala and Kadiri and abdicated in favour of his successors. |

== 12th century ==
| Year | Date | Event |
|---|---|---|
| 1104 | | King Jayawarsa of Kadiri ascends to the throne. |
| 1115 | | King Kamesvara of Kadiri ascends to the throne. Janggala ceases to exist and united under Kadiri domination, highly possible under royal marriage. During his reign Mpu Dharmaja writes Kakawin Smaradahana, a eulogy for the king and become the inspiration of Panji cycle, the tales that spreads across Southeast Asia. |
| 1130 | | King Jayabaya of Kadiri ascends to the throne. |

== 13th century ==
| Year | Date | Event |
|---|---|---|
| 1222 | | Battle of Genter, Ken Arok defeated Kertajaya, the last king of Kediri, thus established Singhasari kingdom Ken Arok ended the reign of Isyana Dynasty and started his own Rajasa dynasty. |
| 1257 | | Baab Mashur Malamo established The Kingdom of Ternate in Maluku. |
| 1275 | | King Kertanegara of Singhasari launched Pamalayu expedition against Melayu Kingdom in Sumatra. |
| 1284 | | King Kertanegara launched Pabali expedition to Bali, which integrated Bali into the Singhasari territory. |
| 1289 | | Kertanegara insult the envoy of Kublai Khan that demand Java to pay the tribute to Yuan Dynasty. |
| 1292 | | Jayakatwang, duke of Kediri, rebelled and killed Kertanegara, ended the Singhasari kingdom. |
| 1292 | | Marco Polo, on his voyage from China to Persia visited Sumatra and reported that on the northern part of Sumatra there were six trading ports including Ferlec, Samudera and Lambri. |
| 1293 | 22 January–early August | Mongol invasion of Java, Kublai Khan of Yuan dynasty China, sent punitive attack against Kertanegara of Singhasari. The Mongol forces were repelled. |
| 1293 | 10 November | The coronation of Nararya Sangramawijaya as the monarch of Majapahit kingdom, marked the foundation of Hindu Majapahit kingdom in eastern Java. |
| 1300 | | Footprint of Islam state is present in northern tip of Sumatra. |

== 14th century ==
| Year | Date | Event |
|---|---|---|
| 1309 | | King Jayanegara succeeds Kertarajasa Jayawardhana as ruler of Majapahit. |
| 1318 | | an Italian Franciscan friar, Mattiussi visited Sumatra, Java, and Banjarmasin in Borneo. In his record he described Majapahit kingdom. |
| 1328 | | Tribhuwana Wijayatunggadewi succeeds Jayanegara as ruler of Majapahit. |
| 1334 | | Hayam Wuruk, son of Tribhuwana Wijayatunggadewi was born. |
| 1334 | | Mount Kelud in East Java erupted. |
| 1334 | | Gajah Mada declared his Palapa oath. |
| 1347 | | Adityawarman moved the capital of Dharmasraya and established the kingdom of Malayupura in Pagarruyung, West Sumatra. |
| 1350 | | Hayam Wuruk, styled Sri Rajasanagara succeeds Tribhuwana Wijayatunggadewi as ruler of Majapahit; his reign is considered the empire's 'Golden Age'. Under its military commander Gajah Mada, Majapahit stretches over much of modern-day Indonesia. |
| 1355 | | Kingdom of Negara Dipa was established in South Kalimantan by Empu Jatmika. |
| 1357 | | In the Battle of Bubat, the Sundanese royal family were massacred by the Majapahit army under the order of Gajah Mada. This event led to the death of Sundanese King Lingga Buana and the princess Dyah Pitaloka Citraresmi that committed suicide. |
| 1365 | | The Old Javanese text Nagarakertagama is written. |
| 1377 | | Majapahit sends a punitive expedition against rebelling Palembang in Sumatra. Palembang's prince, Parameswara, flees to Singapura, eventually became king of Singapura for several years. |
| 1389 | | Wikramawardhana succeeds Sri Rajasanagara as ruler of Majapahit. |
| 1398 | | Majapahit launched an invasion to Singapura. Parameswara (later Iskandar Syah) flees, eventually finding his way to Malacca and establishing it as a major international port. |

== 15th century ==
| Year | Date | Event |
|---|---|---|
| 1405 | | Paregreg war, Majapahit civil war of succession between Wikramawardhana against Wirabhumi. (to 1406) |
| 1405–1407 | | The first voyage of Zheng He, a massive Ming dynasty naval expedition visited Java, Palembang, Malacca, Aru, Samudera and Lambri. (to 1433) |
| 1429 | | Queen Suhita succeeds Wikramawardhana as ruler of Majapahit. |
| 1447 | | Wijayaparakramawardhana, succeeds Suhita as ruler of Majapahit. |
| 1451 | | Rajasawardhana, born Bhre Pamotan, styled Brawijaya II succeeds Wijayaparakramawardhana as ruler of Majapahit. |
| 1453 | | Reign of Rajasawardhana ends. |
| 1456 | | Girishawardhana, styled Brawijaya III, becomes ruler of Majapahit. |
| 1466 | | Singhawikramawardhana, succeeds Girishawardhana as ruler of Majapahit. |
| 1478 | | Reign of Singhawikramawardhana ends. |
| 1500 | | Islam becomes Indonesia's dominant religion. |
| 1500 | | Around late 15th century Bujangga Manik manuscript was composed, tell the story of Jaya Pakuan Bujangga Manik, a Sundanese Hindu hermit journeys throughout Java and Bali. |

== 16th century ==
| Year | Date | Event |
|---|---|---|
| 1509 | | The Portuguese king sends Diogo Lopes de Sequeira to find Malacca, the eastern terminus of Asian trade. After initially receiving Sequeira, Sultan Mahmud Syah captures and/or kills several of his men and attempts an assault on the four Portuguese ships, which escape. The Javanese fleet is also destroyed in Malacca. |
| 1511 | August | Afonso de Albuquerque after sailing from Portuguese Goa conquers the Sultanate of Malacca with a force of 1,200 and seventeen or eighteen ships. |
| 1512 | | The first Portuguese exploratory expedition was sent eastward from Malacca to search for the 'Spice Islands' (Maluku) led by Francisco Serrão. Serrao is shipwrecked but struggles on to Hitu (northern Ambon) and wins the favour of the local rulers. |
| 1520 | | The Portuguese established a trading post in the village of Lamakera on the eastern side of Solor as a transit harbour between Maluku and Malacca. |
| 1520 | | Sultan Ali Mughayat Syah of Aceh begins an expansionist campaign capturing Dayak on the west Sumatran coast, and the pepper and gold producing lands on the east coast. |
| 1520 | | The establishment of Banjar Sultanate in South Kalimantan with Sultan Suriansyah as the first king. |
| 1521 | November | Ferdinand Magellan's expedition reaches Maluku and after trade with Ternate returns to Europe with a load of cloves. |
| 1522 | | The Portuguese ally themselves with the rulers of Ternate and begin construction of a fort. |
| 1522 | August | Luso Sundanese Treaty signed between Portugal and Sunda Kingdom granted Portuguese permit to build fortress in Sunda Kelapa |
| 1535 | | The Portuguese in Ternate depose Sultan Tabariji (or Tabarija) and send him to Portuguese Goa where he converts to Christianity and bequeaths his Portuguese godfather Jordao de Freitas the island of Ambon. |
| 1546 | | Francis Xavier works among the peoples of Ambon, Ternate and Morotai (Moro) laying the foundations for a permanent mission. (to 1547) |
| 1559 | | Sultan Khairun of Ternate protesting the Portuguese's Christianisation activities in his lands. Hostilities between Ternate and the Portuguese. |
| 1562 | | Portuguese Dominican priests build a palm-trunk fortress which Javanese Muslims burned down the following year. The fort was rebuilt from more durable materials and the Dominicans commenced the Christianisation of the local population. |
| 1569 | | Peace treaty was signed by Sultan Khairun of Ternate and Governor Lopez De Mesquita of Portuguese. |
| 1570 | | Sultan Hairun of Ternate is killed by the Portuguese. The reign of Sultan Baabullah. |
| 1575 | | Following a five-year war, the Ternateans under Sultan Baabullah defeated the Portuguese. |
| 1578 | | The Portuguese establish a fort on Tidore but the main centre for Portuguese activities in Maluku becomes Ambon. |
| 1579 | | The British navigator Sir Francis Drake passes through Maluku and transit in Ternate on his circumnavigation of the world. The Portuguese establish a fort on Tidore but the main centre for Portuguese activities in Maluku becomes Ambon. |
| 1583 | | Death of Sultan Baabullah of Ternate. |
| 1595 | | First Dutch expedition to Indonesia sets sail for the East Indies with two hundred and forty-nine men and sixty-four cannons led by Cornelis de Houtman. |
| 1596 | June | de Houtman's expedition reaches Banten the main pepper port of West Java where they clash with both the Portuguese and Indonesians. It then sails east along the north coast of Java losing twelve crew to a Javanese attack at Sidayu and killing a local ruler in Madura. |
| 1597 | | de Houtman's expedition returns to the Netherlands with enough spices to make a considerable profit. |
| 1598 | | The Portuguese require an armada of 90 ships to put down a Solorese uprising. (to 1599) |
| 1598 | | More Dutch fleets leave for Indonesia and most are profitable. |
| 1599 | | The van Neck expedition returns to Europe. The expedition makes a 400 per cent profit. (to 1600) |
| 1599 | March | Leaving Europe the previous year, a fleet of eight ships under Jacob van Neck was the first Dutch fleet to reach the 'Spice Islands' of Maluku. |
| 1600 | | The Portuguese win a major naval battle in the bay of Ambon. Later in the year, the Dutch join forces with the local Hituese in an anti-Portuguese alliance, in return for which the Dutch would have the sole right to purchase spices from Hitu. |
| 1600 | | Elizabeth I grants a charter to the British East India Company beginning the English advance in Asia. |

== 17th century ==
| Year | Date | Event |
|---|---|---|
| 1602 | | The Portuguese send a major (and last) expeditionary force from Malacca which succeeded in reimposing a degree of Portuguese control. |
| 1602 | | The Dutch East India Company (VOC) is established by merging competing Dutch trading companies. |
| 1602 | June | British East India Company's first voyage, commanded by Sir James Lancaster, arrives in Aceh and sails on to Bantam where he is allowed to build trading post which becomes the centre of British trade in Indonesia until 1682. |
| 1603 | | First permanent Dutch trading post is established in Banten, West Java. |
| 1604 | | A second English East India Company voyage commanded by Sir Henry Middleton reaches Ternate, Tidore, Ambon and Banda. Fierce VOC hostility is encountered in Banda thus beginning Anglo-Dutch competition for access to spices |
| 1605 | February | The VOC in alliance with Hitu prepare to attack a Portuguese fort in Ambon but the Portuguese surrender. |
| 1606 | | A Spanish fleet occupies Ternate and Tidore. |
| 1608 | | Iskandar Muda of Aceh Sultanate launched series of naval conquest on coastal Sumatran and Malay peninsula states. (to 1637) |
| 1610 | | The VOC establishes the post of Governor General to enable firmer control of their affairs in Asia. |
| 1611 | | The English establish trading posts at Sukadana (southwest Kalimantan), Makassar, Jayakarta and Jepara in Java, and Aceh, Pariaman and Jambi in (Sumatra) threatening Dutch ambitions for a monopoly on East Indies trade. |
| 1611 | | The Dutch establish a post at Jayakarta (later 'Batavia' and then 'Jakarta'). |
| 1613 | | The Dutch expel the Portuguese from their Solor fort. |
| 1619 | | Jan Pieterszoon Coen appointed Governor-General of the VOC who would show he had no scruples about using brute force to establish the VOC on a firm footing. |
| 1619 | 30 May | Coen, backed by a force of nineteen ships, storms the Jayakarta driving out the Banten forces, and from the ashes of Jayakarta, establishes Batavia as the VOC headquarters. |
| 1620 | | Almost the entire native population of Banda Islands was deported, driven away, starved to death or killed in an attempt to replace them with Dutch colonial slave labour. |
| 1620 | | Diplomatic agreements in Europe commence a three-year period of cooperation between the Dutch and the English over the spice trade. |
| 1623 | | In a notorious but disputed incident, known as the 'Amboyna massacre', ten English and ten Japanese traders are arrested, tried and beheaded for conspiracy against the Dutch Government. The English quietly withdraw from most of their Indonesian activities (except trading in Bantam) and focus on other Asian interests. |
| 1628–1629 | | Sultan Agung of Mataram launched a failed campaign to conquer Dutch Batavia. |
| 1629 | | Iskandar Muda of Aceh Sultanate launched a failed attempt to take Portuguese Malacca. |
| 1636 | | The Portuguese are expelled again from their Solor fort by the Dutch following a reoccupation. |
| 1646 | | Sultan Agung of Mataram dies – and is buried at his graveyard at Imogiri |
| 1667 | | As a result of the Treaty of Breda between Dutch and England, the Dutch secured a worldwide monopoly on nutmeg by forcing England to give up their claim on Run, the most remote of the Banda Islands. While the Dutch did not press their claims on New Netherland. |
| 1674 | | The Trunajaya rebellion. Followers of the Madurese prince Trunajaya rebelled against the Mataram Sultanate. After initial defeats, Mataram requested help from the VOC in exchange for various concessions. VOC-Mataram forces ultimately defeated the rebellion. |
| 1700 | | With the decline of the spice trade, textiles are now the most important trade item in the Dutch East Indies. |

== 18th century ==
| Year | Date | Event |
|---|---|---|
| 1704 | | First Javanese War of Succession. |
| 1712 | | The first shipment of coffee from Java reaches Amsterdam. |
| 1717 | | Surabaya rebels against the VOC. |
| 1719 | | Second Javanese War of Succession. |
| 1735 | | Governor-General Dirk van Cloon dies, one of many victims of disease in Batavia. |
| 1740 | 9 October | A massacre of Batavia's ethnic Chinese begins after they are suspected by the VOC of planning a rebellion. Approximately 10,000 are killed and the Chinese quarter is burned. |
| 1743 | | The capital Kartasura fell under Geger Pecinan uprising — Raden Mas Garendi (Sunan Kuning) led Chinese mercenaries revolted against Pakubuwono II. |
| 1745 | 17 February | Pakubuwono II established a new kraton in Sala village and established Surakarta Sunanate. |
| 1755 | 13 February | The Treaty of Giyanti is signed, effectively partitioning the Mataram Sultanate. The VOC recognizes Mangkubumi as Sultan Hamengkubuwono I, who rules half of Central Java. Hamengkubuwono I then established Yogyakarta Sultanate, moves to Yogya and renames the city Yogyakarta |
| 1757 | 17 March | Salatiga treaty between Prince Sambernyawa with Pakubuwono III and Hamengkubuwono I further partitioning the remnant of Mataram Sultanate, the Mangkunegaran Grand Duchy was established. |
| 1769 | | French expeditions capture clove plants in Ambon, ending the VOC monopoly of the plant. (to 1772) |
| 1770 | | Captain James Cook stops at Onrust Island in the Bay of Batavia for repairs to his ship Endeavour on his round the world voyage. |
| 1778 | 24 April | Royal Batavian Society of Arts and Sciences was established by a group of Dutch intellectuals. This institution is the pioneer of scientific efforts in Indonesia and the founder of National Museum of Indonesia. |
| 1792 | March | Hamengkubuwana I dies. |
| 1795 | 19 January 1795 | The Batavian Republic, a client state of the French First Republic, and successor state to the Republic of the Seven United Netherlands was proclaimed. |
| 1800 | 1 January | The bankrupt Dutch East India Company (VOC) is formally dissolved and nationalised by the Batavian Republic. |

== 19th century ==
| Year | Date | Event |
|---|---|---|
| 1803 | | First phase of Padri War. (to 1825) |
| 1806 | | The Batavian Republic is dissolved and the Kingdom of Holland is created, a puppet kingdom set up by Napoléon Bonaparte. |
| 1808 | | Herman Willem Daendels the Governor-general of the Dutch East Indies, During the French interim (1806–1811) begins the construction of Java Great Post Road. against an Anglo-Dutch invasion. |
| 1811 | August | British invasion of Java during the Napoleonic Wars. Stamford Raffles was appointed as the Lieutenant-Governor of Java. |
| 1814 | November | Raffles' wife, Olivia Mariamne Devenish died in Buitenzorg (now Bogor) in Java. |
| 1814 | | Dutch colonial possessions in the East Indian Archipelago returned to the Dutch following the Anglo-Dutch Treaty of 1814. |
| 1815 | April | Mount Tambora in Sumbawa island erupted, it was the largest volcanic eruption in recorded history that wiped out Tambora culture and killed at least 71,000 people in total (including the aftermath). The eruption created global climate anomalies known as "volcanic winter". |
| 1825 | | Java War (to 1830) |
| 1831 | | Second phase of Padri War (to 1838) |
| 1864 | June | The first railway track in Indonesia was laid between Semarang and Tanggung, Central Java by the Dutch colonial government. |
| 1868 | | The Batavian Museum (today National Museum of Indonesia) was officially opened by Dutch East Indies government. |
| 1870 | | Official dismantling of the Cultivation System and beginning of a 'Liberal Policy' of deregulated exploitation of the Netherlands East Indies. |
| 1873 | | The beginning of the Aceh War. |
| 1879 | 21 April | Kartini was born in Jepara, today the date is commemorated as women's emancipation day in Indonesia. |
| 1883 | August | Mount Krakatoa in Sunda Strait erupted, killed 36,417 people. |
| 1888 | | Founding of the shipping line Koninklijke Paketvaart-Maatschappij (KPM) that supported the unification and development of the colonial economy. |
| 1894 | | Dutch intervention in Lombok and Karangasem The Dutch looted and destroyed the Cakranegara palace of Mataram. J. L. A. Brandes, a Dutch philologist discovered and secured Nagarakretagama manuscript in Lombok royal library. |
| 1898 | | General van Heutz becomes chief of staff of Aceh campaign. Wilhelmina becomes queen of the Netherlands. |
| 1898 | | The Opiumregie begins operations in Batavia. |

== 20th century ==
| Year | Date | Event |
|---|---|---|
| 1901 | | Ethical Policy is proclaimed. |
| 1903 | | Aceh declared conquered. |
| 1904 | | Jo van Heutsz becomes Governor General. Kartini established a school for women in Rembang, just like Dewi Sartika, she was considered as the pioneer of women's rights in Indonesia. |
| 1904 | 16 January | Dewi Sartika established the first school for women in Dutch East Indies in Bandung, she was considered as the pioneer of women's rights in Indonesia. |
| 1906 | | The Dutch intervention in Bali (1906) destroyed the southern Bali kingdom of Badung and Tabanan. |
| 1907 | | Tirto Adhi Soerjo founds civil servants' association Sarekat Priyayi. |
| 1908 | April | During Dutch intervention in Bali (1908), the last Balinese rulers wiped out in puputan ('suicidal battle to death'). |
| 1908 | May | Budi Utomo is proclaimed as the first official nationalist movement. |
| 1912 | | Islamic League (Sarekat Islam) becomes the first mass-based nationalist party. |
| 1912 | | First scientific description ever of Komodo dragon by Peter Ouwens. |
| 1912 | 18 November | The modernist Islamic organization Muhammadiyah was established by Ahmad Dahlan in Yogyakarta. |
| 1914 | | World War I breaks out; the Netherlands is a neutral country in the war. |
| 1917 | | East Indies trade with Europe cut off by the war. |
| 1919 | May | Mt Kelud in East Java erupts with a deathtoll of around 5,000 people. |
| 1920 | May | Communist Party of Indonesia (PKI) is founded. Economic downturn. |
| 1925 | February | Birth of Pramoedya Ananta Toer. A sharp rise in world commodity prices brings prosperity to the Indies. |
| 1926 | 31 January | Nahdlatul Ulama was established by Hasyim Asy'ari as the reaction to the modernist Muhammadiyah organization. |
| 1929 | | The Great Depression in America affected the economy of Dutch East Indies. |
| 1930 | | Sukarno's famous nationalist speech, 'Indonesia Accuses', given as defence in his political trial. |
| 1941 | 8 December | Netherlands declares war on Japan. |
| 1941 | 8 December | Dutch East Indies campaign (8 December 1941 – 9 March 1942) by forces from the Empire of Japan starts. |
| 1942 | 27 February | Battle of the Java Sea, Imperial Japanese Navy defeat Allied forces ABDACOM afterwards Imperial Japan occupies Indonesia during World War II, over throwing the Dutch East Indies and install their own imperial structure. |
| 1942 | 28 February | The Japanese troops invade Java. |
| 1942 | 7 March | Dutch East Indies government in exile established in Australia by Dutch officials headed by Lieutenant Governor General Huib van Mook |
| 1942 | 8 March | Royal Netherlands East Indies Army on Java capitulates. At 09:00 on 8 March, the Commander-in-Chief of the Allied forces—Ter Poorten—announced the surrender of the Royal Netherlands East Indies Army in Java. Instrument of surrender signed in Bandung on 12 March |
| 1942 | 31 December | Merauke Force formed, to reinforce the KNIL garrison in Merauke, West New Guinea. |
| 1944 | 22 April | Start of the liberation of the Dutch East Indies by Allied forces |
| 1944 | April | First Dutch NICA detachments land at Hollandia in New Guinea. |
| 1944 | 16 May | Van Mook–MacArthur Civil Affairs Agreement signed in London concerning the jurisdiction over and administration of civil affairs in Dutch East Indies territory liberated by an Allied expeditionary force during WWII. |
| 1944 | 1 June | 1st Infantry Battalion (KNIL) founded at Camp Victory, near Casino, New South Wales. Australia. |
| 1945 | 9 January | Between January and July landing of Dutch KNIL troops at Biak, Tarakan and Balikpapan. |
| 1945 | 1 June | Sukarno's Pancasila speech. |
| 1945 | 16 July | Draft of constitution for the Republic completed. |
| 1945 | August | Republican government established in Jakarta and constitution adopted. Central Indonesian National Committee (KNIP) established. |
| 1945 | 15 August | Japanese surrender to Allied powers. |
| 1945 | 17 August | "Proclamation of Indonesian Independence," signed by Sukarno-Hatta. |
| 1945 | August | Start of the Bersiap killings during the early stages of the Indonesian National Revolution. |
| 1945 | 3 November | Vice President Hatta proclaims right of the people to form political parties. |
| 1945 | 10 November | Battle of Surabaya. |
| 1946 | | Social revolutions, including the Three Regions (Tiga Daerah) Revolt. |
| 1946 | | Federal states, including the State of East Indonesia are set up by Dutch in the outer islands. |
| 1947 | 25 March | Linggadjati Agreement, first ceasefire. |
| 1947 | 20 July | Major Dutch military offensive to resolve differences by force. |
| 1947 | 25 August | United Nations Commission for Indonesia established. |
| 1948 | | Darul Islam rebellions begin in West Java, spread to other provinces but conclude with the execution of its leader Kartosuwiryo. (to 1962) |
| 1948 | 19 January | The Renville Agreement establishes the Van Mook line between Republican and Dutch held territories. |
| 1948 | August | Fall of the Amir Syarifuddin government, largely from the Renville Agreement fallout. |
| 1948 | 18 September | Madiun Affair: Nationalist leaders launch a revolt in Central Java in an attempt to take over the Revolution but are suppressed by Communist troops. |
| 1948 | 19 December | Dutch undertake second military offensive capturing Republican capital at Yogyakarta and most of the Republican cabinet. Amir Syarifuddin executed by fleeing Republicans. |
| 1949 | February | Tan Malaka executed by Republican Army. |
| 1949 | 1 August | Official ceasefire. |
| 1949 | December | Netherlands Government transferres sovereignty to the United States of Indonesia (RUSI) at the Dutch-Indonesian Round Table Conference. |
| 1950 | | Military articulation of doctrines Dwifungsi and Hankamrata: a military role in sociopolitical development as well as security; a requirement that the resources of the people be at the call of the armed forces. (to 1960) |
| 1950 | 29 January | General Sudirman, commander of Indonesia's armed forces, dies aged 34 |
| 1950 | 24 March | Activation of the Dutch Military Mission for Indonesia |
| 1950 | 25 April | The Republic of South Moluccas (RMS) is proclaimed in Ambon |
| 1950 | 17 August | Following RUSI endorsement of a new constitution, the federation is dissolved and Sukarno proclaims a unitary state, the 'Republic of Indonesia'. |
| 1950 | 6 September | The first cabinet of the unitary state is established. It is led by Prime Minister Mohammad Natsir. |
| 1950 | 27 September | Indonesia becomes the 60th member of the United Nations. |
| 1950 | 28 September | Invasion of Ambon by the Indonesian army to suppress the Republic of South Moluccas. |
| 1951 | 21 March | The Natsir cabinet falls. |
| 1951 | 26 April | The composition of the new cabinet is announced. The new Prime Minister is Dr. Sukiman Wirjosanjojo. |
| 1952 | 25 February | Amid bitter disputes over the signing of a Mutual Security Agreement with the US, the Sukiman cabinet resigns. |
| 1952 | 3 April | The new cabinet, led by Prime Minister Wilopo is inaugurated. |
| 1952 | 17 October | Army-organized demonstrations take place in Jakarta to demand the dissolution of the legislature. Tank guns and machine guns are trained on the presidential palace. This leads to the suspension of General Nasution as army chief of staff following army indiscipline over command and support that threatens the government. |
| 1953 | 2 June | The Wilopo cabinet resigns. |
| 1953 | 31 July | After lengthy negotiations, the composition of the new cabinet is announced. Serving his first term as prime minister is Ali Sastroamidjojo. |
| 1955 | March | Regional rebellions in Sumatra and Sulawesi. (to August 1961) |
| 1955 | 24 March | The second cabinet to be led by Ali Sastroamidjojo takes office. |
| 1955 | 18 April | The city of Bandung hosts the Asia-Africa Conference. It is the first meeting of the Non-Aligned Movement and is attended by world leaders including China's Zhou Enlai, India's Nehru, Egypt's Nasser and Yugoslavia's Tito. (to 25 April) |
| 1955 | 24 July | After a dispute with the Army over appointments, the cabinet resigns. |
| 1955 | 12 August | Led by Prime Minister Burhanuddin Harahap, the new cabinet is sworn in. |
| 1955 | 29 September | Indonesia holds general parliamentary elections; the last free national elections until 1999; support for the parties is widely distributed with four parties each gaining 16–22% and the remaining votes split between 24 parties. |
| 1955 | 15 December | Elections are held for the Constitutional Assembly |
| 1956 | 3 March | The cabinet falls as a result of its policy toward the Dutch. |
| 1956 | 3 May | Indonesia unilaterally abrogates the Round Table Agreement signed with the Dutch in 1949. |
| 1956 | 1 December | Hatta resigns as vice-president. |
| 1957 | 21 February | President Sukarno announces his "Conception" (Konsepsi) of the nature of Indonesia. This will eventually lead to Guided Democracy |
| 1957 | March | Regional rebellions in Sumatra and Sulawesi. (to August 1961) |
| 1957 | 14 March | Martial law is proclaimed. On the same day, the cabinet resigns. |
| 1957 | 9 April | Sukarno appoints a "Working Cabinet" with Djuanda as prime minister. |
| 1957 | 30 November | An assassination attempt on President Sukarno. Grenades are thrown at him as he visits a school in Cikini, Jakarta. |
| 1958 | 18 May | US Air Force pilot Allen Pope is shot down over Ambon, revealing covert American support of regional rebellions, and ends the Dulles brothers', Allen and John, efforts to subvert the Sukarno government. |
| 1959 | 5 July | With armed forces support, Sukarno issues a decree dissolving the Constituent Assembly and reintroducing the Constitution of 1945 with strong presidential powers, and assumes the additional role of Prime Minister, which completes the structure of 'Guided Democracy'. |
| 1959 | 10 July | President Sukarno appoints a "Working Cabinet" with himself as prime minister. |
| 1960 | 18 February | President Sukarno reshuffles the cabinet and appoints the second "Working Cabinet". |
| 1960 | 9 March | Second Lieutenant Daniel Alexander Maukar of the Indonesian Air Force uses a MiG-17 fighter to strafe the Presidential Palace in Jakarta, oil tanks at Tanjung Priok in North Jakarta and then the Bogor Palace. |
| 1960 | 24 June | The House of Representatives-Mutual cooperation (DPR-GR), composed of members chosen by President Sukarno is established. |
| 1960 | 17 August | Indonesia severs diplomatic links with the Netherlands in protest over its refusal to hand over Netherlands New Guinea. |
| 1960 | 30 September | President Sukarno addresses the United Nations General Assembly. |
| 1961 | 4 March | An agreement is signed in Jakarta with the Soviet Union to buy arms with long-term loans. |
| 1961 | 17 August | Building officially starts on the Monas National Monument in the center of Jakarta. |
| 1962 | 2 January | The Mandala Command to "free" Western (Netherlands) New Guinea from the Dutch is established. Its commander is Brigadier General Suharto. |
| 1962 | 15 January | Deputy chief of staff of the Indonesian Navy Commodore Yos Sudarso is killed in a Dutch air attack on the motor torpedo boat (MTB) force he is commanding. |
| 1962 | 8 March | President Sukarno again reshuffles his cabinet. |
| 1962 | 15 August | The New York Agreement, transferring Western New Guinea to Indonesia, is signed at the United Nations. |
| 1962 | 24 August | Jakarta hosts the Fourth Asian Games. (to 4 September) |
| 1963 | | Sole years of American Peace Corps program in Indonesia. |
| 1963 | | Sukarno leads the Konfrontasi campaign against the newly created Malaysia. (to 1965) |
| 1963 | 1 May | Western New Guinea is transferred to the temporary UN supervision. |
| 1963 | 18 May | Parliament elects Sukarno 'President-for-life'. |
| 1963 | 27 July | Sukarno declares Indonesian policy to oppose the creation of Malaysia which incorporate North Borneo, marking the Indonesia–Malaysia confrontation. |
| 1963 | 18 September | Following demonstrations in Jakarta to protest at the creation of Malaysia, the British Embassy is burned by a mob. |
| 1963 | 13 November | President Sukarno conducts the final reshuffle of the "Working Cabinet". |
| 1964 | 17 August | During his Independence Day speech, Sukarno for the first time publicly denounce the United States, and over the following months an anti-American campaign attacked American interests. |
| 1964 | 27 August | President Sukarno appoints the Dwikora Cabinet |
| 1965 | 7 January | Indonesia withdraws from membership of the UN. |
| 1965 | 14 January | The Indonesian Communist Party (PKI) calls for workers and peasants to be armed. |
| 1965 | 11 April | The Third Session of the Provisional People's Consultative Assembly is held in Bandung. (to 16 April) |
| 1965 | 26 May | Foreign Minister Subandrio reports to President Sukarno the existence of the Gilchrist Document, a letter purporting to be from the British ambassador which discusses western military involvement in Indonesia. |
| 1965 | 30 September | An abortive coup in Jakarta results in the murder of six army generals, and disposal of bodies at Lubang Buaya. |
| 1965 | October | A violent anti-communist purge leads to the killing of approximately 1/2 million Indonesians. (to March 1966) |
| 1965 | 1 October | A counter-coup led by General Suharto that leads to the Overthrow of Sukarno |
| 1965 | 14 October | President Sukarno appoints Major General Suharto Minister/Commander of the Army. |
| 1965 | 16 October | The Jakarta Military Command temporarily suspends the activities of the PKI and its organizations in the Jakarta region. |
| 1965 | 13 December | The rupiah is devalued by a factor of 1,000 in an effort to control inflation. |
| 1966 | 10 January | Anti-communist organizations grouped under the Pancasila Front issue the "Three Demands of the People" (Tritura), namely the dissolution of the PKI, the cleansing of the cabinet of elements involved in 30 September Movement, and lower prices and economic improvements. |
| 1966 | 14 February | The Extraordinary Military Court trials of people allegedly involved in 30 September Movement begin. |
| 1966 | 24 February | President Sukarno reshuffles his cabinet, creating what becomes known as the "cabinet of 100 ministers". |
| 1966 | 11 March | Sukarno delegates key presidential powers to Suharto by signing the Supersemar. The following day Suharto dissolves the Indonesian Communist Party. |
| 1966 | 18 March | A total of 14 cabinet ministers are taken into "protective custody". |
| 1966 | 2 May | Following large scale demonstrations, the leadership of the Mutual-Assistance House of Representatives (DPR-GR) is replaced. |
| 1966 | 20 June | The Fourth Session of the Provisional People's Consultative Assembly is held in Jakarta. It raises the status of the Supersemar into a decree, meaning Sukarno cannot revoke it, bans the PKI and its teachings and rejects President Sukarno's accountability speech. (to 5 July) |
| 1966 | 11 August | Indonesia and Malaysia agree to normalize diplomatic relations. |
| 1966 | 28 September | Indonesia rejoins the United Nations. |
| 1967 | 10 January | New investment laws designed to bring in foreign capital are passed; restrictions are introduced regarding status of Indonesian Chinese, their names and their religions. |
| 1967 | 20 February | The Inter-Governmental Group on Indonesia (IGGI) is established as an international consortium of official donors to coordinate the provision of foreign assistance to Indonesia. The IGGI was chaired by The Netherlands until 1992. |
| 1967 | 22 February | In a ceremony at the presidential palace, Sukarno hands over authority to Suharto. |
| 1967 | 7 March | A Special Session of the Provisional People's Consultative Assembly strips Sukarno of his powers and appoints Suharto acting president. (to 12 March) |
| 1967 | 8 August | ASEAN established in Bangkok by Indonesia, Malaysia, the Philippines, Singapore and Thailand. |
| 1967 | 1 October | Diplomatic relations with the People's Republic of China are suspended. |
| 1968 | | Soedjatmoko is Indonesian ambassador to the United States; bilateral relations warm. (to 1971) |
| 1968 | March | Parliament confers full presidential title on Suharto; Sukarno is under effective house arrest. |
| 1969 | | Papuan representatives agree to join Indonesia in the Act of Free Choice. |
| 1970 | | Nurcholish Madjid, a young Muslim modernist, begins to lay out religious developmental principles for Indonesia—'Islam, yes; Islamic party, no'. |
| 1970 | 21 June | Sukarno dies. He is buried at Blitar, East Java. |
| 1971 | | Suharto's wife inspired by a visit to Disneyland, conceives a national cultural theme park. |
| 1971 | 3 July | Indonesia's second parliamentary election and the first under the New Order is held. Golkar wins an outright majority. |
| 1973 | | Government forces fusion of political parties; Nationalist and Christian parties are merged into the Indonesian Democratic Party (PDI) and Muslim parties into the United Development Party (PPP). The new three party system is dominated by Golkar. |
| 1974 | | The 'Malari' uprising in Jakarta against Japanese penetration of the economy, Chinese Indonesian influence, and official corruption. |
| 1975 | April | Mrs Suharto dedicates the vast 'Beautiful Indonesia-in-Miniature Park' (Taman Mini) on the outskirts of Jakarta. |
| 1975 | April | Civil war breaks out in the former Portuguese colony of East Timor. |
| 1975 | 6 December | U.S. President Gerald Ford and Secretary of State Kissinger, returning from China, make a hastily rescheduled one-day visit to Jakarta. |
| 1975 | 7 December | Indonesia launches an invasion of East Timor. |
| 1976 | March | General Ibnu Sutowo is 'dismissed with honour' after a decade as head of Pertamina, the state oil corporation. |
| 1976 | 8 July | Palapa A1, Indonesia's first communication satellite launched from Cape Canaveral. |
| 1976 | 17 July | Suharto signs a bill integrating East Timor into Indonesia as its 27th province. |
| 1976 | 19 November | UN General Assembly rejects Indonesia's annexation of East Timor. |
| 1977 | | The United States surpasses Japan as Indonesia's biggest oil customer. |
| 1977 | October | Sawito Kartowibowo's trial for 'subversion' begins. |
| 1978 | | The People's Consultative Assembly (MPR) elevates Pancasila to the status of compulsory moral education of youth and government officials. Suharto appoints B.J. Habibie as state minister for research and technology. |
| 1978 | 22 February | Suharto inaugurated Istiqlal Mosque, Jakarta, the Indonesian national mosque. |
| 1979 | 21 September | Jakarta host the 10th SEA Games, it was the first time Indonesia host Southeast Asian Games. (to 30 September) |
| 1979 | December | Writer Pramoedya Ananta Toer is released after fourteen years imprisonment with hard labour on Buru Island. |
| 1980 | May | The Petition of Fifty—a statement of concern to parliament about the use of government power, propaganda, and presidential personality cult—is begun. |
| 1982 | | The height of Petrus ('mysterious shootings') of thousands of suspected criminals by government security forces. (to 1983) |
| 1983 | | Prabowo Subianto, then a major in ABRI marries Suharto's daughter Siti Hediati Hariyadi at Taman Mini. |
| 1984 | 12 September | Muslim concerned protesting over alleged insensitivities to Islam at Tanjung Priok; a riot ensues resulting in many deaths. Clamp down on Islamic political leaders. |
| 1984 | December | Abdurrahman Wahid is elected chairman of Nahdlatul Ulama a position previously held by both his father and grandfather. |
| 1985 | | The Indonesian government require all organisations of any kind to adopt Pancasila as their sole basis. |
| 1987 | | Sukarno's daughter Megawati Sukarnoputri becomes a member of parliament; Suharto prohibits display of images of Sukarno although they appear frequently nonetheless. |
| 1987 | 9 September | Jakarta host the 14th SEA Games. (to 20 September) |
| 1988 | | Suharto is elected to a fifth term as president., Lilies Handayani, Nurfitriyana Saiman and Kusuma Wardhani won Indonesia's first medal in Olympic Games, a silver medal for women's team archery in 1988 Summer Olympics Seoul. |
| 1989 | | The Free Aceh Movement (GAM) reemerges following its 1976 founding; suppression of its guerilla activities leads to 2,000 deaths by 1991 in Aceh. |
| 1991 | | Indonesia wins presidency of the Non-Aligned Movement. |
| 1991 | 12 November | ABRI troops fire on demonstrative funeral procession in Dili, East Timor. TV images of the killings put East Timor high on the international human rights agenda. |
| 1992 | | Suharto successfully defies Dutch efforts to link human rights to aid administered since 1967 by the International Governmental Group on Indonesia (IGGI). Susi Susanti won Indonesia's first Olympic gold medal in 1992 Summer Olympics in Barcelona, Spain. |
| 1992 | | East Timorese resistance leader Xanana Gusmão is captured by Brigadier General Theo Syafei and is tried and sentenced. (to 1993) |
| 1993 | | Suharto seeks a sixth term and is easily re-elected. |
| 1994 | June | Suharto shuts down Tempo and two other publications for critical reporting of Habibie's purchase of the former East German navy. |
| 1996 | | The Free Papua Movement (OPM) kidnaps fourteen scientists and foresters in Iran Jaya garnering international attention. After four months, the abductees are rescued in a bloody operation led by Prabowo. |
| 1996 | April | Ibu Tien Suharto, the president's wife of 48 years, dies of a heart attack. |
| 1996 | July | Military-backed thugs burst into headquarters of PDI, Megawati's party, and evict her supporters in a violent climax to government efforts to vitiate her party's popularity. |
| 1997 | | Severe social unrest breaks out across Indonesian cities against Chinese Indonesians, Christians, symbols of wealth, the police and bureaucracy. (to 1998) |
| 1997 | February | Alarmed at a dukun's prediction that 'the nail of Java has come loose', Suharto commands a massive Ruwat Dunia ceremony ('Cleansing of the world') near Borobudur. |
| 1997 | June | Pacific Ocean trade winds shift heralding the onset of the El Niño; severe drought across much of Indonesia follows in the ensuing months accompanied by highly destructive forest fires. |
| 1997 | July | The collapse of the Thai baht starts the East Asian financial crisis and over the ensuing months Indonesia is the country hardest hit. |
| 1997 | 26 September | Garuda Indonesia Flight 152, an Airbus A300, crashed in the mountains of a village called Buah Nabar. Killing all 222 passengers and 12 crew on board. One of the deadliest aviation accidents in Indonesian history. |
| 1997 | 11 October | Jakarta host the 19th SEA Games. (to 19 October) |
| 1998 | March | Largely peaceful student demonstrations against the regime rise to national prominence. |
| 1998 | 11 March | Suharto unanimously elected by the MPR to his seventh presidential term. |
| 1998 | 12 May | Four student demonstrators at Trisakti University are shot dead by bullets unproven but thought likely to have been from army sources. |
| 1998 | 13 May | Memorial services for killed students leads to riots; vandalism, arson, looting and rape by roving mobs which continue unchecked by security forces for two days leaving 1,200 dead. |
| 1998 | 20 May | For National Awakening Day, Amien Rais pledges to bring a million protestors into the streets to demonstrate against at the National Monument in Jakarta. Faced with barbed wire and massed troops he calls off the rally fearing bloodshed. |
| 1998 | 21 May | After being deserted by his cabinet, Suharto resigns the presidency. Habibie assumes presidency. |
| 1998 | August | General Wiranto announces the discharge of Lieutenant General Prabowo from active duty, with full pension benefits—and without court-martial for allegations of abduction and torture of student activist (some of whom remain missing as of 2003). |
| 1998 | 10 November | Megawati, Rais, and the sultan of Yogya, meet at Wahid's home in Ciganjur, and issue a series of statements including a demand for the military to end their role in politics within six years. |
| 1998 | 13 November | On the last day of the MPR sessions, soldiers open fire on demonstrating students killing at least fifteen and injuring hundreds. |
| 1999 | 19 January | A petty argument between in the city of Ambon triggers Christian-Muslim clashes that last for three years across Maluku. As many as 10,000 are killed and 700,000 or one third of the region are displaced. |
| 1999 | 7 June | Indonesia's first free and fair national elections since 1955 take place with almost no disruption and wide participation. Votes however are distributed across forty-eight parties with no party achieving a majority. |
| 1999 | September | Timor-Leste votes to secede from Indonesia in a referendum conducted under UN auspices. Four-fifths of voters choose independence for East Timor over integration with Indonesia. Pro-integration militias trained and paid by ABRI immediately resort to a scorched earth policy that leaves 1,000 dead and most of the territory's infrastructure ruined. |
| 1999 | 13 September | President Habibie relents to international pressure and allows a UN peacekeeping force known as 'INTERFET' to enter East Timor and restore order. |
| 1999 | October | The Indonesian parliament rejects President Habibie's accountability speech. Wahid whose party received one eighth of the popular vote is elected president by the MPR. Megawati whose party received one third of the vote (the highest) is elected vice president. |
| 2000 | | President Wahid's administration is marred by failures to stabilise the economy, patterns of political favouritism, economic corruption (although Wahid himself is not accused of corruption), inability to reform the military, personal eccentricity and pettiness, ineffectiveness in dealing with major religious violence in Maluku and Sulawesi, major ethnic violence (Dayaks vs. Madurese) in Kalimantan, and separatisms in Aceh and Irian Jaya. |
| 2000 | 24 December | In a coordinated attack involving more than three dozen sites across the country, churches are bombed and eighteen people killed. It is later proven to have been planned by Jemaah Islamiyah in retaliation for Christian killings of Muslims in the Maluku conflict. |

== 21st century ==
| Year | Date | Event |
|---|---|---|
| 2001 | | Ethnic violence in Kalimantan as indigenous Dayaks force out Madurese transmigrants. Mass political demonstrations by Wahid's supporters and opponents. IMF stops further loans citing lack of progress in tackling corruption. |
| 2001 | July | President Wahid is impeached chiefly on grounds of incompetence. The parliament elects Megawati president by 592 votes to 0. Hamzah Haz defeats Akbar Tandjung and Lieutenant General (ret.) Susilo Bambang Yudhoyono. |
| 2001 | September | President Megawati visits President George Bush a week after the 9/11 terrorist attacks and welcomes American investment. On her return to Indonesia, the Islamic right criticises her cooperation with America's war in Afghanistan, and the nationalist left criticises here for being too suppliant to foreign investors. |
| 2002 | | Nahdlatul Ulama and Muhammadiyah, the largest Muslim organisations in Indonesia, issue joint statements critical of militant Islamists. |
| 2002 | February | Peace talks in Malino, South Sulawesi appear to end three years of Christian-Muslim violence in Maluku and Poso. |
| 2002 | July | Tommy Suharto is sentenced to fifteen years jail for illegal possession of arms, contempt of law, and masterminding the assassination of a Supreme Court judge who had convicted him for graft. |
| 2002 | September | House Speaker Akbar Tandjung is sentenced to three years jail for corruption. |
| 2002 | 12 October | Bombs in the Kuta nightclub district in Bali kill 202 people, the deadliest terrorist attack in Indonesia's history. Indonesian police, aided by ten nations, track down Jemaah Islamiyah operatives. |
| 2002 | November | Eurico Guterres is sentenced to ten years prison for crimes committed following the 1999 ballot in East Timor. |
| 2002 | December | The Indonesian government and GAM sign a peace accord aimed at ending decades of violence in Aceh. The deal breaks down the following year. |
| 2003 | August | Jemaah Islamiyah bomb Jakarta's Marriott hotel killing twelve. All but one of those killed are Indonesians. |
| 2004 | April | Parliamentary and local elections: Golkar party of former President Suharto wins greatest share of vote, with Megawati Sukarnoputri's PDI-P coming second. |
| 2004 | 9 September | A bomb blast outside the Australian embassy in Jakarta kills 11 and injures up to 100 people. |
| 2004 | October | Indonesia's first direct presidential election elects Susilo Bambang Yudhoyono following popular disillusionment with incumbent Megawati. |
| 2004 | 26 December | An earthquake-triggered tsunami kills an estimated 170,000 in Aceh and causes widespread devastation. |
| 2005 | 15 August | Government and Free Aceh Movement separatists sign a peace deal providing for rebel disarmament and the withdrawal of government soldiers from the province. Rebels begin handing in weapons in September; government completes troop pull-out in December. |
| 2005 | 1 October | Bombings in Bali kill 20 people. |
| 2006 | 27 May | The 6.4 M_{w} Yogyakarta earthquake shakes central Java with an MSK intensity of IX (Destructive), leaving more than 5,700 dead and 37,000 injured. |
| 2007 | 1 January | Adam Air Flight 574 crashes into the sea in Makassar Strait off Sulawesi, killing all 102 on board. |
| 2007 | 7 March | Garuda Indonesia Flight 200 overran the runway in Adisucipto International Airport killing at least 21 people. |
| 2008 | 27 January | Suharto dies from multiple organ failure. He is buried in the family Mausoleum near Solo. |
| 2008 | 9 November | Jemaah Islamiyah Operatives are executed when found guilty for the 2002 bombings after numerous appeals from their families. |
| 2009 | 8 July | Incumbent President Susilo Bambang Yudhoyono won Indonesian presidential election. |
| 2009 | 17 July | Jemaah Islamiyah bomb two hotels in Jakarta, including the Marriott that was attacked in 2003. |
| 2009 | 17 September | Noordin Mohammad Top, the head of Jemaah Islamiyah, is shot in Solo, Central Java |
| 2009 | 30 December | Abdurrahman Wahid, the 4th president of Indonesia died because of complications from kidney disorders, heart disease and diabetes. |
| 2010 | 25 October | Merapi volcano erupted, over 350,000 people were evacuated, 353 people were killed, Borobudur was covered in volcanic ash. (to 17 November) |
| 2011 | 7 May | Jakarta host 18th ASEAN Summit, mark the beginning of Indonesian chairmanship in ASEAN 2011. (to 8 May) |
| 2011 | 11 November | Opening ceremony of the 26th Southeast Asian Games was held in Palembang. The largest multi-event sports in the region was held in Jakarta and Palembang. (to 22 November) |
| 2012 | 9 May | Russian Sukhoi Superjet 100 crashed against Mount Salak, West Java, killing 45 people abroad during a demonstrational flight. |
| 2013 | 5–7 October | Indonesia host the APEC Summit 2013 in Nusa Dua, Bali. |
| 2014 | 9 April | Indonesia held their legislative election, PDI-P dominate the People's Representative Council, followed closely by Golkar and Gerindra. |
| 2014 | 9 July | Indonesia held their presidential election, according to quick count Jakarta's Governor Joko Widodo won against former military general Prabowo Subianto, however both sides claims victory. |
| 2014 | 22 July | Indonesian Election Commission announced Joko Widodo wins Indonesian presidential election with 53.15% of the vote with his rival, ex-general Prabowo Subianto, on 46.85%. |
| 2014 | 20 October | Joko Widodo and Jusuf Kalla sworn in as Indonesian President and Vice President for the period of 2014–2019 in a plenary session of the People's Consultative Assembly (MPR). Thousands of people celebrating the inauguration ceremony by attending parade along Sudirman and Thamrin avenue, followed by a concert in Merdeka Square featuring Slank, Arkarna, and various bands. |
| 2014 | 28 December | Indonesia AirAsia Flight 8501 on its way from Surabaya to Singapore, crashed in bad weather into Java Sea, off the coast of Pangkalan Bun, Central Kalimantan, killing all 155 passengers and seven crew on board. |
| 2015 | June – November | Dozens of Indonesians are killed by respiratory illness and accidents due to poor visibility caused by severe haze. The haze occurs annually during dry season and is largely caused by illegal agricultural fires due to slash-and-burn practices in Indonesia, especially from the provinces of South Sumatra and Riau in Indonesia's Sumatra island, and Kalimantan on Indonesian Borneo. The haze also hit neighboring Singapore, Malaysia, and Brunei. |
| 2016 | 14 January | At least three militants reportedly detonated explosives in or near a Starbucks cafe in Central Jakarta. Then the militants threw grenade to a police post nearby, destroying the post and killing at least 3 men. Gunfire had ensued when police arrived shortly afterwards. |
| 2018 | 18 August to 2 September | Indonesian cities of Jakarta and Palembang hosts 2018 Asian Games. The opening ceremony was held in Gelora Bung Karno Stadium. This was the second time Indonesia hosted this Asian multi-sports event, the last time had been in 1962. |
| | 28 September | A 3 metres tall tsunami triggered by a 7.4 magnitude earthquake hits Palu, Donggala and Mamuju in Central Sulawesi, killing nearly 1,350 people. |
| | 29 October | Lion Air flight 610 crashes into the sea just after takeoff near Jakarta, Indonesia, killing all 189 on board. |
| 2019 | 17 April | Joko Widodo has been re-elected as Indonesia's president in 2019 Indonesian general election. |
| 2019 | 26 August | President Joko Widodo has announced that the country's new capital city will be located in East Kalimantan on Borneo island. The new capital will replace Jakarta and will be built in part of Penajam North Paser regency and part of Kutai Kertanegara regency. |
| 2020 | 2 March | President Joko Widodo confirmed the first two cases of COVID-19 in Indonesia. According to the Minister of Health Terawan Agus Putranto, the patients contracted the virus from an infected Japanese person in Depok and later tested positive in Malaysia. |
| 2020 | 6 October | Protests erupt throughout Indonesia after Indonesian House of Representatives passes the controversial Omnibus Law on Job Creation. |
| 2021 | 9 January | Sriwijaya Air Flight 182 crashed into the Java Sea, 4 minutes after takeoff, killing all 62 people on board. |

== See also ==
- Timeline of Jakarta
- List of years in Indonesia
