= 2012 in Indonesia =

- Centuries: 20th; 21st
- Decades: 1990s; 2000s; 2010s; 2020s
- See also: History of Indonesia; Timeline of Indonesian history; List of years in Indonesia

Events from the year 2012 in Indonesia

== Incumbents ==
| President | Vice President |
|---|---|
| Susilo Bambang Yudhoyono | Boediono |

== Events ==
- April 9: Acehnese gubernatorial election, 2012
- April 11: 2012 Indian Ocean earthquakes
- May 9: Mount Salak Sukhoi Superjet 100 crash
- June 21: 2012 Indonesian Air Force Fokker F27 crash
- June 21: 2012 Indian Ocean migrant boat disaster
- July 11: Jakarta gubernatorial election, 2012
- August 8: Multiply announced that it was closing down its social networking platform and continuing as an e-commerce website instead.

== Television ==
=== Debuted ===
- Asmara
- Eat Bulaga! Indonesia
- JKT48 School
- Love in Paris
- Separuh Aku
- Tukang Bubur Naik Haji The Series
- X Factor Indonesia
- Yusra dan Yumna

=== Ended ===
- Asmara
- Deal Or No Deal Indonesia
- JKT48 School

== Sport ==
- 2012 Indonesia national football team results
- 2011–12 Indonesian Premier League
- 2011–12 Indonesia Super League
- 2012 Piala Indonesia
- 2012 Aceh Governor Cup
- 2012 Indonesia Open Grand Prix Gold
- 2012 Pekan Olahraga Nasional
- 2012 ASEAN School Games
- 2012 Asian Aerobic Gymnastics Championships
- 2012 Asian Women's Handball Championship
- 2012 Tour de Singkarak
- Indonesia at the 2012 Summer Olympics
- Indonesia at the 2012 Summer Paralympics
- Indonesia at the 2012 Asian Beach Games
