= 2010 in Indonesia =

- Centuries: 19th; 20th; 21st
- Decades: 1990s; 2000s; 2010s; 2020s
- See also: History of Indonesia; Timeline of Indonesian history; List of years in Indonesia

Events from the year 2010 in Indonesia

== Incumbents ==
President	Vice President
Susilo Bambang Yudhoyono	Boediono

== Events ==
- April 7: 2010 Banyak Islands earthquake
- April 13: Merpati Nusantara Airlines Flight 836
- April 25 – 30: 2010 World Geothermal Congress
- May 22: Mount_Rinjani erupted three times
- May – June: Indonesia 2010 census
- June 1: Miss Indonesia 2010
- June 16: 2010 Papua earthquake
- October: 2010 eruptions of Mount Merapi
- October 2: Petarukan train collision
- October 6: 2010 West Papua floods
- October 8: Puteri Indonesia 2010
- October 25: 2010 Mentawai earthquake and tsunami
- November 4: Qantas Flight 32

== Television ==
The following TV shows debuted this year in Indonesia.

- Indonesia's Got Talent
- Katakan Katamu
- Putri yang Ditukar
- Who Wants to Be a Millionaire Hot Seat (Indonesian game show)

== Sport ==
- 2010 Indonesia national football team results
- 2009–10 Indonesia Super League
- 2009–10 Liga Indonesia Premier Division
- 2010 Commonwealth Bank Tournament of Champions
- 2010 Asian Women's Club Volleyball Championship
- 2010 Indonesia Super Series
- Indonesia at the 2010 Asian Games
- Indonesia at the 2010 Asian Beach Games
- Indonesia at the 2010 Summer Youth Olympics
- Indonesia at the 2010 Asian Para Games
