= 2013 in Indonesia =

- Centuries: 19th; 20th; 21st
- Decades: 1990s; 2000s; 2010s; 2020s
- See also: History of Indonesia; Timeline of Indonesian history; List of years in Indonesia

Events from the year 2013 in Indonesia

== Incumbents ==
President	Vice President
Susilo Bambang Yudhoyono	Boediono

== Events ==
=== January ===
- January 5 – 15: Cyclone Narelle
- January 15 – February 23: 2013 Jakarta flood

=== February ===
- February 20: Vania Larissa has winner at Miss Indonesia and become Top 10 at Miss World to honour Indonesia country.

=== March ===
- March 23: Cebongan Prison raid

=== April ===
- April 13: Lion Air Flight 904

=== May ===
- May 27: MIH Holdings confirmed that Multiply will shut down entirely on May 31.
- May 31: Multiply cease operations.

=== July ===
- July 2: 2013 Aceh earthquake

=== September ===
- September 28: Miss World 2013 held in Nusa Dua, Bali.

=== October ===
- October 5–7: APEC Indonesia 2013

=== November ===
- November: Shōnen Star's last issue is published.

=== December ===
- December 7: The Bali Package is signed
- December 9: 2013 Bintaro train crash

== Television ==
=== Debuted ===
- Minute to Win It
- The Voice Indonesia
- Yuk Keep Smile

=== Ended ===
- Love in Paris

== Sport ==
- 2013 Indonesia national football team results
- 2013 Indonesia Super League
- 2013 Indonesian Premier League
- 2013 Liga Indonesia First Division
- 2013 Liga Indonesia Second Division
- 2013 MNC Cup
- 2013 Indonesian Community Shield
- 2013 AFF U-19 Youth Championship
- 2013 Islamic Solidarity Games
- 2013 Indonesia Open Grand Prix Gold
- 2013 SEABA Under-16 Championship
- 2013 Indonesia Super Series Premier
- Indonesia at the 2013 Asian Indoor and Martial Arts Games
- Indonesia at the 2013 Asian Youth Games
- Indonesia at the 2013 Summer Universiade
- Indonesia at the 2013 World Aquatics Championships
- Indonesia at the 2013 World Championships in Athletics
