= 2011 in Indonesia =

- Centuries: 19th; 20th; 21st
- Decades: 1990s; 2000s; 2010s; 2020s
- See also: History of Indonesia; Timeline of Indonesian history; List of years in Indonesia

Events from the year 2011 in Indonesia

== Incumbents ==
President	Vice President
Susilo Bambang Yudhoyono	Boediono

== Events ==
- January 28
  - A massive fire broke out on MV Laut Teduh 2, causing 27 deaths and hundreds of injuries.
  - At least 5 people were killed and 35 others were injured after two passenger trains collided at a train station in Banjar, West Java.
- February 12 - A Sabang Merauke Raya Air Charter CASA C-212 carrying two crew members and three passengers crashed during a test flight in Tanjung Pinang, Riau Islands. All five people on board were killed.
- March 11 - At least 67 houses were damaged and one person was killed after a tsunami, which originated from Japan, struck Jayapura.
- April 15 - 2011 Cirebon bombing, a suicide bomber attacked a mosque inside a police compound in Cirebon. At least 28 people were injured.
- May 7 - Merpati Nusantara Airlines Flight 8968 crashes into the sea while on approach to Kaimana, Papua. All 25 people on board were killed.
- August 3 - A Nyaman Air Service Bell 420 crashed onto Dua Saudara Mountain in Bitung, North Sulawesi. All 10 people on board were killed.
- August 27 - MV Windu Karsa capsized off the coast of Lambesina Island in Kolaka Regency, Southeast Sulawesi. At least 13 people were killed and 23 others were missing.
- September 25 - A suicide bombing struck a cathedral in Solo. At least 28 people were injured in the attack. The perpetrator was the sole fatality.
- September 29 - Nusantara Buana Air Flight 823, a CASA C-212 carrying 18 passengers and crews, crashes into the jungle of Sumatra while enroute to Aceh, killing all aboard.
- November 18–19 - Sixth East Asia Summit

== Television ==
=== Debuted ===
- Big Brother
- MasterChef Indonesia

=== Ended ===
- Katakan Katamu
- Putri yang Ditukar

== Sport ==
- 2011 Indonesia national football team results
- 2010–11 in Indonesian football
- 2011 FIBA Asia Championship qualification
- 2011 Asian Men's Club Volleyball Championship
- 2011 Commonwealth Bank Tournament of Champions
- 2011 Indonesia Open Grand Prix Gold
- 2011 ASEAN Para Games
- 2011 Southeast Asian Games
- Indonesia at the 2011 Southeast Asian Games
- Indonesia at the 2011 World Championships in Athletics
- Indonesia at the 2011 World Aquatics Championships
- Indonesia at the 2011 Summer Universiade
