= 2017 in Indonesia =

- Centuries: 19th; 20th; 21st
- Decades: 1990s; 2000s; 2010s; 2020s
- See also: History of Indonesia; Timeline of Indonesian history; List of years in Indonesia

2017 (MMXVII) was a common year starting on Sunday of the Gregorian calendar, the 2017th year of the Common Era (CE) and Anno Domini (AD) designations, the 17th year of the 3rd millennium and the 21st century, and the 8th year of the 2010s decade.

Year 2017 was a major political year for Jakarta as the province held the 2017 gubernatorial election. Indonesia also held local elections across Indonesia simultaneously, the second time since 2015. The gubernatorial election was marred with controversies, particularly when the incumbent Governor of Jakarta Basuki Tjahaja Purnama was caught on tape quoting a certain verse of the Qur'an. This caused anger among residents which ultimately led to his defeat and subsequent mass protests and arrest. The blasphemy case supposedly revealed 'deep intolerance' in Indonesia.

== Incumbents ==
=== President and Vice President ===
President	Vice President
Joko Widodo	Jusuf Kalla

=== Ministers and Coordinating Ministers ===
==== Coordinating Ministers ====
Photo	Position	Name
	Coordinating Minister of Political, Legal, and Security Affairs	Wiranto
	Coordinating Minister of Economic Affairs	Darmin Nasution
	Coordinating Minister of Maritime Affairs and Investment	Luhut Binsar Pandjaitan
	Coordinating Minister of Human Development and Culture	Puan Maharani

==== Ministers ====
Photo	Position	Name
	Minister of State Secretariat	Pratikno
	Minister of Home Affairs	Tjahjo Kumolo
	Minister of Foreign Affairs	Retno Marsudi
	Minister of Defence	Ryamizard Ryacudu
	Minister of Law and Human Rights	Yasonna Laoly
	Minister of Finance	Sri Mulyani
	Minister of Energy and Mineral Resources	Ignasius Jonan
	Minister of Industry	Airlangga Hartarto
	Minister of Trade	Enggartiasto Lukita
	Minister of Agriculture	Amran Sulaiman
	Minister of Environment and Forestry	Siti Nurbaya Bakar
	Minister of Transportation	Budi Karya Sumadi
	Minister of Marine Affairs and Fisheries	Susi Pudjiastuti
	Minister of Manpower	Hanif Dhakiri
	Minister of Public Works and Public Housing	Basuki Hadimuljono
	Minister of Health	Nila Moeloek
	Minister of Education and Culture	Muhadjir Effendy
	Minister of Agrarian Affairs and Spatial Planning	Sofyan Djalil
	Minister of Social Affairs	Khofifah Indar Parawansa
	Minister of Religious Affairs	Lukman Hakim Saifuddin
	Minister of Communication and Information Technology	Rudiantara
	Minister of Research and Technology	Mohamad Nasir
	Minister of Cooperatives and Small & Medium Enterprises	Anak Agung Gede Ngurah Puspayoga
	Minister of Women's Empowerment and Child Protection	Yohana Yembise
	Minister of Administrative and Bureaucratic Reform	Asman Abnur
	Minister of Villages, Development of Disadvantaged Regions and Transmigration	Eko Putro Sandjojo
	Minister of National Development Planning	Bambang Brodjonegoro
	Minister of State-Owned Enterprises	Rini Soemarno
	Minister of Tourism and Creative Economy	Arief Yahya
	Minister of Youth and Sports	Imam Nahrawi

== Events ==
=== January ===
- 1 January
  - Indonesian rupiah new format has officially used in Indonesia but many of citizens used old format of rupiah.
  - The Government of Indonesia officially issued a statement condemning the attack on Istanbul nightclub on New Year's Eve perpetrated by ISIS. The Indonesian Embassy in Istanbul was advised to protect every Indonesian citizens in Turkey and advised Indonesian to stay in contact with local authorities.
  - MV Zahro Express, a tourist boat carrying 184 people caught fire while en route to Pulau Tidung in Thousands Islands, Jakarta. The incident was caught on video and due to its coincidence with New Year's Day, the incident was covered extensively. At least 23 people were killed in the blaze. Search and Rescue officials stated that 17 people were missing.
  - A fugitive suspected of carrying out a deadly robbery in Pulomas, East Jakarta in 2016 identified as Ius Pane was arrested by the Indonesian National Police.
- 4 January – Indonesian Government temporarily terminated its military relation with Australia after a suspected insult and discrimination against the symbol and ideology of Indonesia and several sensitive political issues of Indonesia were found during training on a military base in Australia.
- 18 January
  - Bears in Bandung Zoo caught the world's attention after photos taken by tourists shown that the bears have poor welfare and were very skinny.
  - A photo of a dolphin, who was transported by Sriwijaya Air in a 'really wrong procedure', sparked public debate on the handling of Indonesian animals for commercial and entertainment purposes.
- 19 January
  - A 5-month-old baby was found positive of cocaine by the National Narcotics Board in Central Kalimantan.
  - At least 20.000 people joined a march demanding the dismissal and the 'eradication' of the Islamic Defender Front in Bandung, West Java.
- 23–24 January – The death of 3 students of the Islamic University of Indonesia during an initiation program in Yogyakarta sparked massive outrage and an intense public debate on whether similar program should be continued or discontinued.
- 27 January – One of the judges of the Indonesian Constitutional Court Patrialis Akbar was arrested by the Indonesian Corruption Eradication Commission on a hotel in Jakarta.

=== February ===
- 2 February – A controversial incident occurred on board Lion Air Flight 745 when 3 crew members asked a female passenger to join them to smoke inside the cockpit. All 3 crew members were "de-activated" from their job. The female passenger reported this event and asked the police to investigate the incident. The incident, however, occurred on 9 January 2017.
- 3 February – A boat carrying 40 people sunk near Makassar. At least 21 people survived the accident and 9 people were killed.
- 9 February – 71 houses were either damaged or destroyed when a tornado struck two villages in Banyuasin, South Sumatra. Dozens of people were injured in the incident.
- 10 February
  - 12 people were killed in Kintamani, Bangli Regency, Bali as multiple landslides struck the island.
  - 7 schools collapsed after a freak storm struck Manggarai, East Nusa Tenggara. A hall was also destroyed.
- 11 February – A major protest was held by the Indonesian Islamic People Forum in response to Jakarta's Christian Governor Basuki Tjahaja Purnama's remarks on Al-Maidah ayah 51 in October 2016. The protest was one of several major protests opposing the governor that was held by Islamic hardliner organizations in the country.
- 12 February – Tensions rise as an Indonesian army post was destroyed by locals in Sukabumi.
- 14 February
  - Telkom 3S, an Indonesian satellite owned by Indonesian-communication giants Telkomsel, lifted off from Kourou, French Guiana.
  - An image depicting the killing of an orangutan and its subsequent eating by local people in Central Kalimantan shocked the nation. The Indonesian House of Representatives ordered an immediate investigation into the killing. Reports suggested that the perpetrators were workers of a nearby palm oil factory.
- 15 February – The 2017 Indonesian local election. President Joko Widodo designated this day as a national holiday.
- 16 February
  - Siti Aisyah, an Indonesian worker in Malaysia, was arrested as the police suspected that she had been involved in the assassination of North Korean supreme leader Kim Jong-un's half brother Kim Jong-nam.
  - 2 houses collapsed and 9 people were hurt after two strong aftershocks, measuring 5.5 MW and 5.4 MW jolted the regency of Pidie Jaya.

Incredible footage of Krian tornado

- 17 February
  - More than 4,000 people fled the city of Brebes after a massive flood submerged 4 villages in the city. Local Indonesian National Board for Disaster Management stated that a dam located on a nearby river had failed to operate.
  - A tornado struck several villages in Krian, Sidoarjo. At least 449 structures were heavily damaged or destroyed and 2 people were injured in the incident. 50 police personnel were deployed in response to the disaster. Indonesian National Police also stated that they would send aid and supplies to the people affected by the tornado.
- 21 February – Another major protest was held by the Indonesian Islamic People Forum in response to Jakarta's Christian Governor Basuki Thajaha Purnama's remarks on Al-Maidah ayah 51 in October 2016. It was the second time in a month and the fourth time in less than six-month.
- 24 February – A cover of a book depicting a child masturbation spurred intense debate on early sex education and Indonesian tradition and norms followed.
- 25 February – 3 people were killed and over 600 people were injured after a riot occurred due to dispute over the results on the regional election in Intan Jaya, Papua. Several buildings were burned during the riot. As situation went out of control, several aircraft had to be diverted and had to carry the injured.
- 26 February – 7 people were killed after a tourist bus carrying teachers and students plunged onto a ravine in Tawangmangu, Central Java.
- 27 February – Bandung terror attack
  - Terrorist detonated a pressure cooker bomb in Pandawa Park, Bandung when dozens of high school students were gathering at the site. No one was injured in the blast. After being chased by locals and students, the perpetrator entered a local office and began shouting and screaming, before telling people leave.
  - Police asked the perpetrator to turn himself in. However, the perpetrator refused and burned the second floor of the office. Bomb disposal unit were called in and the police later shot the perpetrator. The perpetrator was later pronounced dead.
  - According to police officials, the perpetrator was an ex-terrorist prisoner and had ties with ISIS.

=== March ===
- 1 March – King Salman of Saudi Arabia arrived at Halim Perdana Kusuma Airport and officially began the royal family first foreign trip to Indonesia in 35 years
- 2 March – Riot occurred inside a prison in Jambi. Widespread damage was reported at the prison. At least 6 prisoners were taken to hospital and 4 others escaped from the facility.
- 4 March
  - King Salman officially ended its diplomatic trip in Bogor and Jakarta and began his vacation trip in Bali.
  - The first ever Indian Ocean Rim Association (IORA) Leaders' Summit was held in Indonesia's capital city of Jakarta.
- 6 March – Hundreds of homes were destroyed after a massive landslide swept through a village in West Sumatra. 6 people, including one infant, were killed in the disaster.
- 8 March
  - Reports of widespread damage after a freak storm swept Surabaya. Indonesian National Police also confirmed the presence of hail during the storm. At least 1 person was killed due to the incident.
  - A Grab ojek driver in Bandung was rammed by a local bus driver, which caused him to be in critical condition. The suspect was arrested and was charged for attempted murder.
- 9 March – A video of a family frantically screaming inside a car after being attacked by mobs of local drivers, who refused the operation of online transportation in Indonesia, went viral on social media. The attack drew widespread condemnation and subsequently caused public outcry on whether local buses (angkot) should be operated anymore on the streets.
- 10 March – Thousands of people joined the anti-online transportation protest throughout Indonesia. The protest was attended mainly by local bus drivers and ojek drivers who refused to accept the operation of online transportation in Indonesia.
- 12 March – Arema FC won the 2017 President Cup.
- 13 March – A college student was shot dead by a policeman in Jember due to 'revenge'. Police later detained the suspect and fired him. The incident sparked massive outcry in police brutality.
- 17 March
  - A sling of a lift suddenly snapped in M Square Department Store in Jakarta. Due to the incident, 25 people were injured. Police suspected that the lift had been overloaded.
  - Public outrage after 58-year-old Indra hanged himself during Facebook Live.
- 20 March – Police rescued a Malaysian woman identified as Ling Ling in Batam. She had been kidnapped by several people for at least a month after being abducted by several people from her house in Johor, Malaysia.
- 22 March – Indonesian embassies had been informed about the attack on Westminster and condemned the attack. The Foreign Ministry later sent condolences to the victims of the attack.
- 24 March – Gunfire erupted in Cilegon after police raided a house linked to a terror plot. 1 person was killed in the incident.
- 31 March
  - Another massive protest conducted by Islamic religious group was held in Istiqlal Mosque, Jakarta.
  - A first year student of a renowned school Taruna Nusantara, was found dead in his bed in a barrack with a deep wound on his neck. Police later arrested the suspect who was his own barrack-mate. The murder drew public condemnation and outcry on Indonesian's school security.

=== April ===
- 1 April – A massive landslide swept through a village in Ponorogo. Dozens of people were missing in the initial aftermath and hundreds more were evacuated. Hundreds of homes were also destroyed. Disaster area was later declared and search and rescue operation was commenced in the area. 10 people were injured.
- 2 April – At least 4 people were killed and dozens more injured after a minibus carrying tourists slammed into a mango tree in Gunung Kidul, Yogyakarta.
- 3 April – Indonesian Ministry of Foreign Affairs condemned the bombing in Saint Petersburg Metro which killed 15 people and injured more than 60 others.
- 7 April – Indonesian Ministry of Foreign Affairs condemned another terror attack in Sweden's capital Stockholm and issued a warning for Indonesians living in Stockholm.
- 8 April – 6 suspected terrorists were involved in a gunfight with the police after attacking a police station in Tuban, all were later shot dead by police.
- 9 April
  - 5 people went missing after a landslide struck a village in Nganjuk, East Java.
  - Indonesia showed its solidarity to the Egyptians in response to the attacks on two Coptic churches in Alexandria and Tanta on Palm Sunday, which killed 45 people and wounded hundreds.
- 10 April – Massive public outcry and condemnation after 5 members of a family was killed "sadistically" by an unknown person. The only survivor of the murder was a 4-year-old Kirana who suffered serious injury in the aftermath of the murder. The case became sensational and an arrest warrant was later issued after the perpetrator was identified as Andi Lala.
- 10–12 April – Joko Widodo stated his intention on moving Indonesia's capital from Jakarta to Palangkaraya, Central Kalimantan due to economic and strategic benefit. This was the first serious discussion about the moving of the capital to Palangkaraya since 2013.
- 11 April
  - Prominent figure of the Indonesian Corruption Eradication Commission, Novel Baswedan, was splashed with highly corrosive liquid by unknown perpetrators. The incident drew widespread condemnation. He was later flown to Singapore for further treatment.
  - Banyumas Police Station was attacked by a man wielding a knife, injuring 3 people. The attacker was shot dead by police. Investigation found that he had pledged allegiance to ISIS before the attack.
  - At least 2.400 people were evacuated after massive flash flood swept through Southeast Aceh Regency. 2 people were killed and more than 100 houses were damaged.
- 12 April – 12 miners drowned to their deaths in Gresik, East Java after their boat capsized.
- 18 April – A driver rammed police during a traffic check in Palembang. The driver was going to escape the check when the incident occurred. Police fired several shots at the car, which later killed the driver's mother who was sitting at the back seat. The driver and the other passengers were injured. The incident sparked public debate, and opinions on the public were divided, where several people blamed the driver and several other blamed the police. The incident raised questions on police procedures on handling suspects.
- 19 April – 2017 Jakarta gubernatorial election, second round has been decided and confirmed with the next incumbent of Jakarta government is given to Anies Baswedan and Sandiaga Uno as vice government will taking office at October 2017.
- 20 April – Indonesia and America officially declared a joint effort to combat terrorism.
- 22 April – Achintya Holte Nielsen won the Miss Indonesia 2017 competition.
- 23 April – A bus carrying tourists rammed through 13 vehicles in Puncak, Bogor, killing 4 people and injuring 21people.
- 24 April
  - 11 hikers were struck by lightning in Dieng Plateau, Wonosobo. At least 3 of them died. The location of the hike was later closed by authorities.
  - At least 52 houses were damaged or destroyed after a magnitude 5.4 earthquake struck Tasikmalaya, West Java.
- 26 April – A police in Bengkulu fatally shot his own son after thinking he was a burglar. Outrage followed and sparking further debate on police procedure. Questions surfaced on whether police should own a gun.
- 28–30 April – 1.000 flower arrangements were sent to the Jakarta City Hall for Basuki Tjahaja Purnama in response to his loss during the Jakarta gubernatorial election, the first time in the history of Indonesian politic where such phenomenon occurred. The phenomenon went viral and was awarded by the Indonesian Museum of Records as the largest flower arrangements ever occurred in Indonesia.
- 30 April

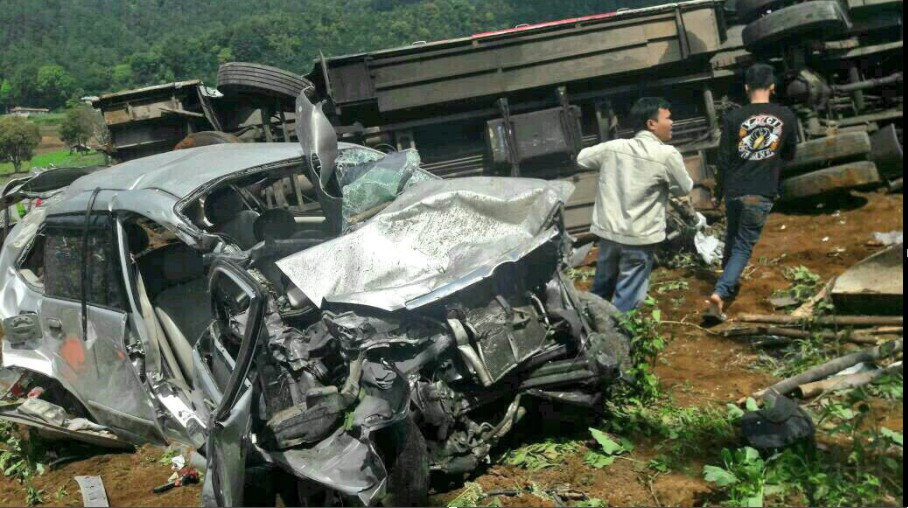
Immediate aftermath of the Second Puncak Tragedy (Ciloto Disaster)

  - At least 127 wells suddenly collapsed at the same time throughout a village in Kediri, East Java, prompting panic throughout the village. Eyewitnesses stated that the before the collapse the well released bubbles and the water quality in the well changed from pristine to murky.
  - 13 were killed after a flash flood swept through Sambungrejo Village, Magelang.
  - A bus carrying dozens of tourists suddenly suffered braking failure while descending from Puncak, Bogor. The bus went out of control, slammed onto a warung, rammed through at least 10 vehicles until it fell off a cliff, while dragging several other vehicles. The bus went upside down. The disaster killed 11 people and injured 47 people, 5 of them seriously wounded.

=== May ===
- 1 May – Several demonstrators of the International Labour Day set fire to several floral arrangement dedicated for Basuki Tjahaja Purnama, prompting criticism.
- 5 May – Islamist hardliner group held another mass rally, demanding the imprisonment of the incumbent Christian Governor of Jakarta Basuki Tjahaja Purnama.
- 8 May
  - At least 200 prisoners escaped from Sialang Bungkuk Prison in Pekanbaru, Riau. Several dozens were immediately captured by the Indonesian National Police while others were still on the run.
  - Indonesian Islamist Organisation, Hizbut Tahrir Indonesia (HTI) suspected of supporting the ideology of caliphate was "dissolved" by the Indonesian Government. The group was accused by Indonesians of supporting the change of Indonesian ideology from Pancasila to khilafah ideology. Multiple Islamic Organisation supported the Government.
- 9 May – Ahok Verdict
  - Djarot Saiful Hidayat was inaugurated as the acting governor of Jakarta after the incumbent Governor of Jakarta, Basuki Tjahaja Purnama a.k.a. Ahok, was convicted guilty for blasphemy.
  - Mass rally, organised by Ahok's supporter, was held immediately after the verdict
  - Hundreds of mass candles act, attended by thousands, were held across Indonesia, with numerous people sang Indonesian national song and demanded the release of Ahok. The hashtag #RIPHukum (eng: #RIPLaw) immediately went viral after Ahok's verdict.
- 12 May – 7 people were killed after a landslide swept houses in East Luwu, South Sulawesi.
- 17 May – 4 Indonesian soldiers were killed after a freak cannon accident during military training in Natuna, Riau Islands.
- 18 May – A student was killed after reportedly beaten to death by his senior in a police academy in Semarang. The seniors stated that they were "just teaching a lesson". The incident sparked massive public outcry, with Indonesian people questioned about the safety of public education places.
- 19 May – 5 people were killed after KM Mutiara, a ship carrying 134 passengers and 50 trucks, caught fire off Masalembu, East Java.
- 22 May – Indonesian Foreign Ministry advised Indonesians in Manchester to be cautious after a terror attack inside Manchester Arena, killing 22 people. The ministry later condemned the bombing.

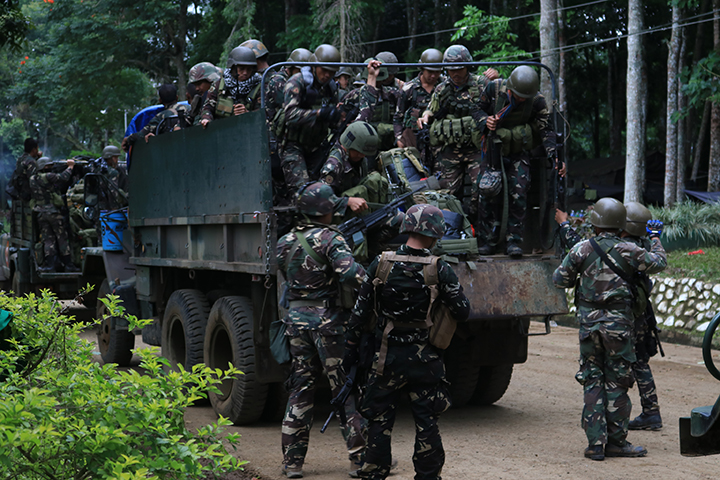
Troops deployed after deadly clashes between Philippines military and Islamic terrorist group in Marawi

- 23 May
  - Indonesian National Police raided a gay party attended by hundreds in Kelapa Gading, Jakarta. The gay sex party was condemned by the public. The public subsequently praised the police action.
  - Indonesian Government stated their concerns on the ISIS "invasion of Marawi" in the Philippines. They later stated that numerous Indonesians were in Marawi and some of them participated in the "invasion".
- 24 May
  - Basuki Tjahaja Purnama formally appealed to resign from office as governor in Jakarta to President Joko Widodo
  - Two Improvised explosive devices was set off near a bus stop in Kampung Melayu, East Jakarta at around 9 p.m. during a torch parade before Ramadhan. This incident caused 5 fatalities, 2 of the suicide bombers and 3 nearby policemen, as well as leaving several injured.
- 26 May – 7 people from the Audit Board of Indonesia, one of whom was the main auditor, were arrested by the Indonesian National Police. All of them were suspected of bribery.
- 28 May – SAFEnet warned the Indonesian National Police on "Ahok Effect Persecution".
- 29 May
  - Indonesian National Police declared Islamic Defenders Front leader Rizieq Shihab as a suspect in his pornography case with Firza Husein. Firza confirmed that the pornography chat was real.
  - A magnitude 5.0 earthquake struck Gayo at a depth of 10 km, damaging a house.
- 30 May – A shallow magnitude 6.6 earthquake struck the Indonesian city of Poso, collapsing dozens of structures including churches and injuring 5 people.
- 31 May – Indonesian Government condemned the terror blast near the German Embassy in Kabul which left at least 150 people dead.

=== June ===
- 1 June – Indonesian Rupiah 2017 banknotes new format has been officially used in all regions of Indonesia.
- 5 June – Concerns emerge among Indonesian officials after the start of the diplomatic crisis in Qatar.
- 7 June – The Ministry of Foreign Affairs issued a statement condemning the terror attack in London Bridge and Borough Street which left 7 people dead and 48 people injured.
- 11 June – A fatal shoot and run robbery in Daan Mogot, Jakarta sparked public debate on street safety.
- 12 June
  - 3 people were killed and 19 were injured after a bus fell into a ravine in Merak Highway.
  - 100 houses were damaged after a massive hailstorm in Karo, North Sumatra.
- 13 June – Indonesian college student Italia Chandra Kirana Putri was shot dead by a burglar after she tried to tackle the burglar from stealing her motorcycle. The incident caused mass outrage.
- 14 – 20 June
  - The decision of Indonesian Education and Culture Minister Muhadjir to implement "full day school" was criticized by the public.
  - The Ministry of Education and Culture reviewed the Full Day School program. Minister of Education and Culture Muhadjir Effendy later announced that Full Day School program won't be cancelled despite numerous criticisms from the public.
- 16 June – Former Indonesian Health Minister Siti Fadilah Supari was sentenced to 4 years in prison due to her involvement in a corruption case.
- 18 June
  - 8 people were killed after their car slammed into a truck in Bali.
  - An Indonesian soldier was stabbed by a suspected gang member in Kemayoran, Jakarta. Hours later, a revenge attack occurred. A car crashed into the gang members, killing two. The driver was later arrested.
- 23 June – 44th American President Barack Obama and his family visited Indonesia and stayed for vacation. His visit was welcomed warmly by the public and the media.
- 24 June – 4 people were killed after Rosalia Indah Bus fell into a ravine in Purbalingga, Central Java.
- 25 June – Two people snuck into a police station in North Sumatra and stabbed an officer to death. Witnesses reported that the attackers shouted "Allahu Akbar" (God is great) during the attack. One of the attacker was later shot dead by the police while the other was arrested. The attack drew widespread condemnation among Indonesians. Numerous religious group condemned the attack.
- 26 June – 7-Eleven closed all their operational franchises in Indonesia.
- 26 – 28 June – At least 33 hot air balloons were sighted and reported by airline pilots throughout Indonesia. The incident caused disturbance in air travel and sparked outrage and national debate on whether hot air balloon should be flown in Java.
- 30 June – A man stabbed two policemen inside a mosque in South Jakarta. The policemen were injured. Witnesses stated that the attacker shouted "Taghut" during the attack. The attacker was followed by the police and later was shot dead on the street. The attack drew widespread condemnation among Indonesians. Police stated that the attacker was a "hardliner Muslim".

=== July ===
- 2 July
  - A phreatic eruption occurred in Sileri Crater. injuring at least 10 people.
  - A BASARNAS-owned helicopter crashed onto a mountain in Temanggung, Central Java while responding to the aftermath of the eruption. All 8 people on board were killed in the crash.
- 4 July – An ISIS flag was found outside the Kebayoran Lama police station.
- 5 July
  - Muhammad Hidayat reported Kaesang Pangarep, the son of incumbent Indonesian President Joko Widodo, to the police. Hidayat suspected Kaesang of blasphemy since he claimed that he found blasphemous material in one of Kaesang's video. The incident caused massive media attention and public outrage on Hidayat since most of the public believed that not a single blasphemous material were found inside the video.
  - Joice Warouw slapped an Aviation Security official in Sam Ratulangi International Airport, Manado. The incident was caught on video and the video subsequently went viral. Joice slapped the official because she refused to take off her watch and put it into the airport's X-Ray machine because she was the wife of a commando. The incident caused subsequent outrage.
  - A marriage of a 16-year-old Slamet and 71-year-old Rohaya in South Sumatra shocked the public. The news of the marriage went viral. Later, Social Minister Khofifah Indar Parawansa stated that their marriage was illegal.
- 6 July – A tornado struck Deli Serdang, North Sumatra. 93 houses were either damaged or destroyed.
- 8 July – A suspected pressure cooker bomb exploded inside a house in Buah Batu, Bandung, West Java. The maker of the bomb, Agus Wiguna, was injured in the accidental explosion and was later arrested by the police. In the following hours, police found another bomb from the same house and foiled two terror plots targeting a church and a café in the area.
- 9 July – An IT expert, Hermansyah, was beaten while he was driving with his wife in Jagorawi toll. Police stated that he was in serious condition due to the beating. In the initial hours, conspiracy theory began to surface, with thousands of people blamed the police of conducting an inside job.
- 11 July – Police arrested the suspects of the hacking of Hermansyah. Road rage was revealed as the cause of the incident.
- 13 July – President Joko Widodo signed a decree to ban and dissolute hardline Islamist groups in Indonesia. The move was made since the authorities found an Islamist group that would like to implement sharia and a caliphate in Indonesia, which conflicted with the nation's secular ideology. Though the move was received positively by most Indonesians and most Islamic groups; civil rights group, opposition group and conservative Islamic group condemned the move; calling them as a move of dictatorship.
- 14 July
  - 40 houses were damaged after a magnitude 5.5 earthquake struck Padangsidempuan, North Sumatra.
  - Social media application Telegram was blocked by the Indonesian Government. The government blocked the app due to fear of terrorists using the app. This move however was shamed by the Indonesian public, stating that the move was ineffective and unnecessary.
  - Bus and truck collision in Probolinggo kills 10 people
- 16 July – Video footage captured an autistic boy being bullied at Gunadarma University, Jakarta. The video went viral and it immediately sparked massive public outrage, with the public demanded justice for the victim. Gunadarma University official later announced an investigation into the case.
- 17 July
  - A video captured a bullying of a Junior High School Student in Thamrin City, Jakarta. The victim was bullied by 9 other students. The video showed that the victim was kicked and punched by the perpetrators. The video immediately went viral, sparking massive outrage and criticism. Due to the recent incident of bullying, both cases become a national debate, with questions raised on school's safety.
  - Australia agreed to provide funding for 10 'new Bali'.
  - Gunadarma University confirmed that the boy that was being bullied the day prior was not an autistic boy.
- 18 July – At least 47 houses and 2 mosques were damaged after an earthquake measuring 3.7 on the Richter Scale struck Bandung Regency.
- 20 July
  - A villager was killed and several others were injured after a military bomb accidentally set off in a house in Riau. The bomb was accidentally left unattended by the military after training in the area.
- 22 July – Portions of a pillar collapsed during a graduation ceremony in Bandung Institute of Technology (ITB), Bandung. 6 people were injured in the incident.
- 23 July – A massive explosion rocked the city of Kebumen. The explosion occurred on a house in a dense residential area. Though dozens of structures were either damaged or destroyed, no one was killed or injured in the incident. Police stated that firecrackers inside the house might have been ignited.
- 26 July – Yulianis, witness of the corruption case of Anas Urbaningrum, testified on the People's Representative Council on how Corruption Eradication Commission treated her during the case.
- 28 July – Thousands of hardliner Islamist and Hizbut Tahrir Indonesia (HTI) members held a rally in Jakarta to oppose President Joko Widodo's decision to ban hardliner Muslims organisation.

=== August ===
- 2 August - Leader of the opposition party, Indonesian Unity Party, Hary Tanoesoedibjo, declared his intention to support incumbent President Joko Widodo as a candidate of the 2019 Indonesian presidential election.
- 7 August
  - Outcry after a pitbull fatally attacked a young child in Malang.
  - Series of attacks by monkeys in Boyolali, Central Java sparked fears among residents.
- 8 August - A burglar was beaten by a mob in Bekasi. The mob later set him on fire while he was in a critical condition. The incident was caught on tape and sparked a wide outrage throughout Indonesia. Public outcry regarding the mob justice immediately followed.
- 11 August - 5 people were killed and 4 others were injured after a propane tanker exploded in a harbour in Serang.
- 15 August - Indonesian National Police arrested 5 people in Antapani, Bandung. Police suspected that they were planning to execute a chemical attack.
- 16 August - After months of delay and uncertainty, the Indonesian Aerospace N-219 flew for the first time.
- 18 August - Indonesian President Joko Widodo officially opened the Asian Games Countdown in Jakarta and Palembang.
- 20 August - The Malaysian Government issued an official apology after an incident in which the Indonesian flag was accidentally shown upside down. The incident sparked massive outrage and further straining the diplomatic ties of the Indonesian and the Malaysian government.
- 20–29 August - A major Umrah company, First Travel, was accused of fraud after hundreds of its customers were neglected.
- 25 August - Indonesian Police revealed a major hate-speech website which was responsible for spreading false information and hoax.

=== September ===
- 3 September - 5 people died after a minibus went out of control on Cipali Highway, West Java.
- 7 September - The Indonesian Ministry of Foreign Affairs confirmed that no Indonesians were killed or injured after a massive 8.1 magnitude earthquake struck the state of Chiapas, Mexico, which killed at least 100 people. The Indonesian government later sent their deepest sympathy to Mexico.
- 8 September - A fire on board a Pertamina ship killed at least 5 workers. One person was critically injured.
- 9 September - A case in which a baby named Debora was denied treatment due to lack of funds sparked outrage.
- 14–24 September - 3 teenagers died and 76 were taken to hospital due to drug consumption in Southeast Sulawesi. The authorities stated that it was a new kind of drug, identified as Paracetamol Caffeine Carisoprodol.
- 15 September - 138 structures were damaged or destroyed in South Solok, West Sumatra after a massive flash flood swept the area. South Solok Regency later declared a state of emergency.
- 16 September
  - Indonesians who lives in the British Virgin Islands were evacuated by the government after major Hurricane Irma swept the area and causing mass devastation.
  - Prominent Indonesian figures Prabowo Subianto and Amien Rais took part in a "solidarity for Rohingya" act at the National Monument, Jakarta. The march, however, was accused of being filled with hate speech.
- 19 September - Indonesian Foreign Minister Retno Marsudi has appealed for calm after a 7.1 M.w earthquake struck Mexico City, the capital of Mexico, which killed 369 people. The government of Indonesia confirmed that there were no Indonesians killed in the disaster and later sent their deepest condolences to the victims of the disaster.
- 28 September – Indonesian Government official said that 120,000 people have been evacuated from their homes on Bali, following warnings that Mount Agung will erupt.
- 29 September - 7 people in Malang, East Java were killed due to carbon monoxide poisoning. Authorities believed that the generator was, somehow, placed inside the room and stated that most of the victims were not aware of the amount of carbon monoxide inside the room.

=== October ===
- 1 October - The Indonesian Government announced that no Indonesians were injured or killed in the mass shooting in Las Vegas, which killed 58 people. Indonesian President condemned the shooting in its strongest term and called the incident as a "despicable terror attack".
- 9 October - A gay spa in Jakarta was stormed by the Indonesian National Police. 51 people were arrested for "doing inappropriate sexual behavior".
- 11 October - A magnitude 4.9 earthquake struck the city of Lembata, East Nusa Tenggara. 10 aftershocks were recorded. At least 100 structures across the city were damaged or destroyed and more than 2.000 were displaced.
- 14 October - President Joko Widodo officially opened several newly built highways.
- 16 October -Anies Baswedan and Sandiaga Uno were officially inaugurated and ratified as governors and representative in Jakarta.
- 24 October - 7 Indonesians were killed after the bus they were riding on crashed in Penang. The Indonesian Government sent their condolences to the next of kin.
- 26 October – the Tangerang fireworks disaster, the deadliest industrial accident in Indonesia, resulted in at least 47 people killed and 46 others injured in the incident.
- 28 October - The Indonesian Government stated that they didn't recognize the final results of the 2017 Catalonia independence referendum, in which it claimed that 90% of Catalans supported an independent Catalonia, and added that they would only recognize Catalonia as a part of Spain.
- 29 October - 4 girders collapsed on top of construction workers in Pasuruan. 1 worker was killed and 2 others were injured. An investigation was launched into the cause of the collapse.

=== November ===
- 31 October -1 November - 88 earthquakes ranging from 5.0 to 6.0 struck Ambon, the capital of Maluku. Several structures were damaged. The Indonesian Agency for Meteorology, Climatology and Geophysics asked the residents of Ambon for calm in response to the earthquakes.
- 12 November
  - Suspected ISIS sympathizer set the Dharmasraya Police Headquarters in Dharmasraya, West Sumatra, on fire. Police officials stated that no police officers were injured in the incident. The incident was treated as a terror attack.
  - A massive 7.3 magnitude earthquake struck the province of Kermanshah in Iran. The quake was strongly felt in the Iraqi Kurdistan and throughout the Kermanshah province. At least 630 people were killed in the earthquake and thousands more were injured. The Indonesian Foreign Ministry announced that there were no Indonesians who were killed or injured in the disaster.
- 14 November - Puteri Indonesia Lingkungan 2017, Kevin Lilliana was crowned Miss International 2017 in the coronation night held at Tokyo Dome City Hall in Tokyo, Japan. She was the first ever Indonesian to win Miss International beauty pageant, the third oldest and biggest Big Four international beauty pageants in the world. During the speech portion of the pageant, the women were given a chance to express their plans if crowned Miss International and share their personal advocacies. Lilliana's speech read:

"Bhinneka Tunggal Ika, Indonesia’s national motto that means 'Unity in Diversity'. Indonesia is one of the few countries that has such a diversity of cultures, languages and beliefs. That is why I am a big believer in unity in diversity. This world is a beautiful place because of its wide variety, not similarities, and if I become Miss International I will spread these positive values and spread the culture of accepting and respecting differences, because I know that every country has their own cultures, character and identities. Therefore, let’s create a perfect solution by learning, understand and appreciating each other."

- 17 October - Setya Novanto, a suspect in the Indonesia's largest corruption scandal, got into a car accident in Jakarta. Indonesian public accused that the accident was staged.
- 23 November - A tornado struck a densely populated residential area in Sidoarjo, East Java. More than 700 homes were damaged or destroyed in the disaster. Hundreds of people evacuated from the area and the local government sent aids to the affected families.
- 27 November - 30 November - Tropical Cyclone Dahlia and Cempaka struck the Southern coast of Java, bringing torrential rains and flooding. In Pacitan, East Java, dozens of people were killed due to flash floods.

=== December ===
- 1 December - The Indonesian Government sent a strong condemnation to the government of America after President Donald Trump announced that his administration officially recognized Jerusalem as the capital of Israel.
- 5 December - Ministry of Health officially declared the diphtheria outbreak as Extraordinary Event (Kejadian Luar Biasa).
- 18 December - Rallies to support Palestine were conducted across Indonesia.

== Deaths ==
=== January ===
- 10 January – Achmad Kurniawan, footballer (b. 1979).
- 13 January – Muhammad Fachroni, Singer (b.1973).

=== March ===
- 16 March – Hasyim Muzadi, Islamic scholar, cleric and fourth Chairman of Nahdlatul Ulama (b.1944).
- 27 March – Eko DJ, TV Actor (b.1952).

=== April ===
- 10 April – Renita Sukardi, Actress (b.1979).
- 22 April – Natasha Rosdiana, former Presenter of Jak TV (b.1992).
- 30 April – Mbah Gotho (born, reportedly, 1870).

=== June ===
- 1 June – Yana Zein, actress (b.1972).
- 10 June – Julia Perez, actress (b.1980).

=== August ===
- 4 August - Ryan Thamrin, host and TV presenter (b.1978).

=== October ===
- 15 October - Choirul Huda, goalkeeper of Persela Lamongan (b. 1979).

=== November ===
- 20 November - Laila Sari, actress (b.1935).
