= Thamrin (disambiguation) =

Mohammad Husni Thamrin was an Indonesian national hero.

Thamrin may also refer to:

- Jalan MH Thamrin (Jakarta), a thoroughfare in Jakarta, Indonesia
- Thamrin City, a mall in Jakarta, Indonesia
- Thamrin Graha Metropolitan Medan, a football club based in North Sumatra, Indonesia
- Thamrin MRT station, a transit station in Jakarta, Indonesia
