= 2015 in Indonesia =

- Centuries: 20th; 21st
- Decades: 1990s; 2000s; 2010s; 2020s
- See also: History of Indonesia; Timeline of Indonesian history; List of years in Indonesia

The following lists events that happened during 2015 in Indonesia.

== Incumbents ==
- President: Joko Widodo
- Vice President: Jusuf Kalla
- Chief Justice: Muhammad Hatta Ali

== Events ==
=== January ===
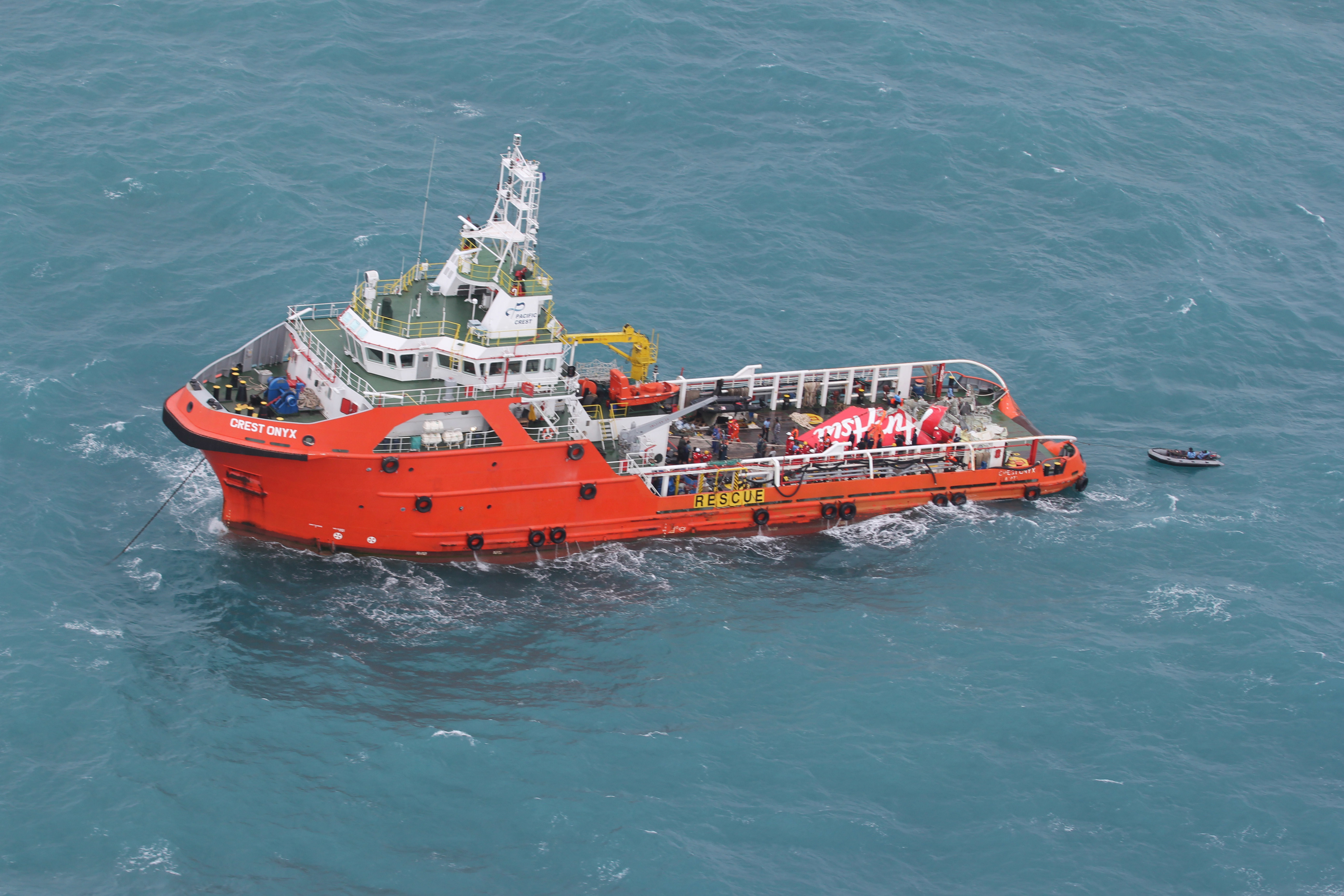
An offshore supply ship with the tail of PK-AXC on its stern on 10 January 2015

- 11 January – Divers retrieve the flight data recorder from the crashed Indonesia AirAsia Flight 8501.
- 13 January – Divers recover the cockpit voice recorder from the crashed Indonesia AirAsia Flight 8501.
- 23 January – Second Chief of Corruption Eradication Commission Bambang Widjajanto was arrested by the police in response to a corruption scandal.

=== February ===
- 14 February – The Prime Minister of Australia Tony Abbott issues a last-minute plea for Bali Nine drug smugglers Andrew Chan and Myuran Sukumaran facing the death penalty in Indonesia.
- 17 February – The President of Indonesia Joko Widodo drops his nomination of Budi Gunawan as national police chief following allegations that Gunawan was involved in a bribery scandal.
- 27 February – Salvage workers recovered a large piece of fuselage, including the wings, of QZ8501. Lifting balloons were used to lift the fuselage, but the first attempt failed as the balloons deflated.

=== March ===
- 17 March – The official search for bodies of QZ8501 ended, after 106 bodies had been recovered. Fifty-six bodies remained unaccounted for.

=== April ===
- 8 April – A bomb exploded in a residential area in Tanah Abang district, Jakarta, killing one person and wounded several others. Police have stated that terrorists were behind the attack, even though they have claimed that they didn't know who was responsible for the attack.
- 14 April – The Indonesian National Armed Forces has arrived in Yemen to evacuate the remaining Indonesian due to the ongoing conflict.
- 17 April – Inspector General Badrodin Haiti officially inaugurated by Joko Widodo, becomes the 22nd Chief of National Police.
- 29 April – Bali Nine duo, Andrew Chan and Myuran Sukumaran were executed in the Nusakambangan Island in Indonesia along with several others with the exception of Mary Jane Veloso, who was spared in the last minutes. The execution prompted a widespread protest in few countries, including Australia.

=== May ===
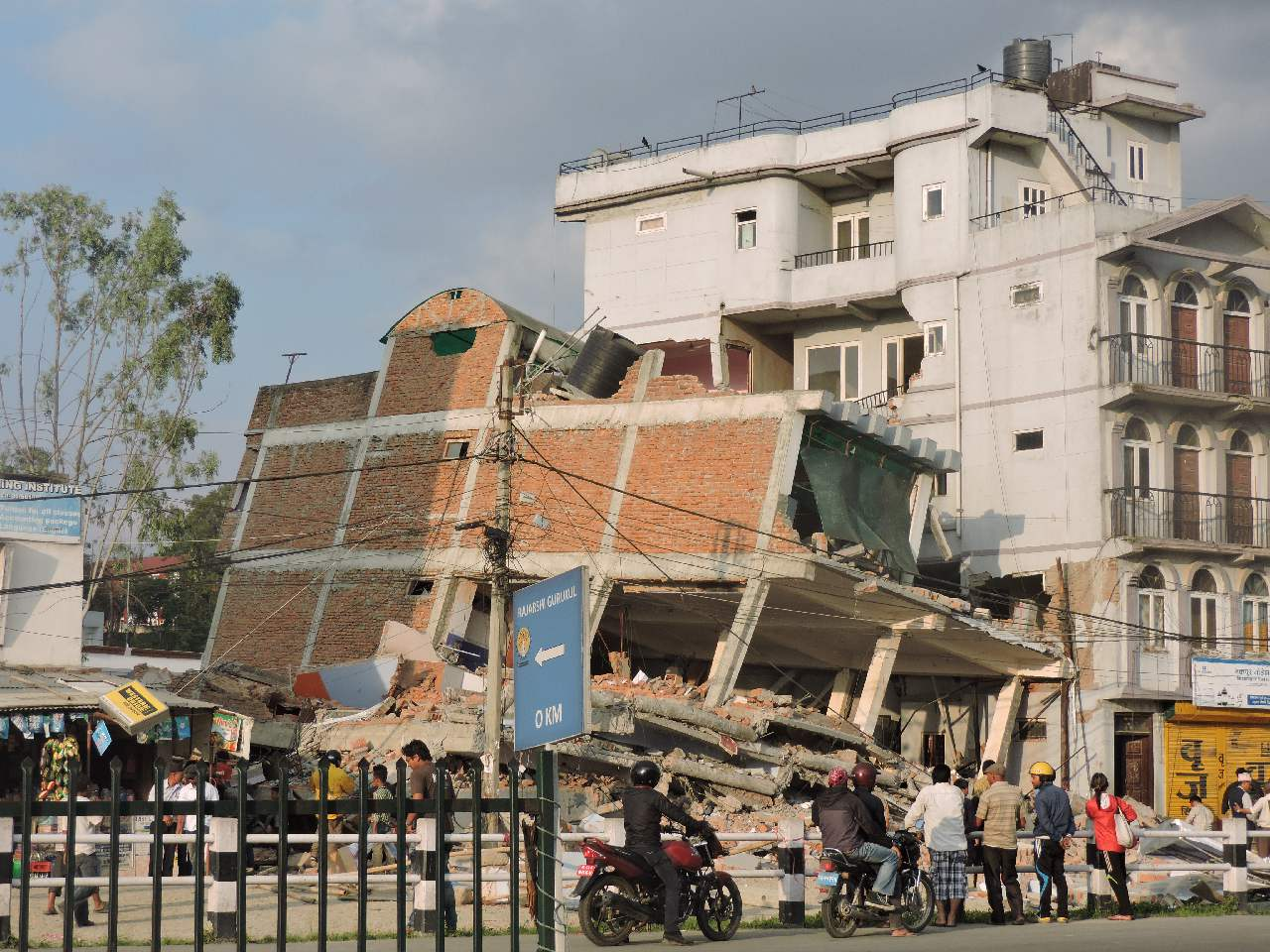
Massive earthquake in Nepal kills 8.000 people

- 4 May – In response to the massive earthquake in Nepal, President Joko Widodo ordered to evacuate all of the remaining Indonesian in Nepal.
- 16 May – Engeline Margret Megawe, an 8-year-old girl, went missing from her home in Bali.
- 23 May – President Joko Widodo announced the start of the construction of Indonesia's tallest skyscraper which resembles the twin tower in Kuala Lumpur. It was named 'Indonesia Satu Tower'.

=== June ===
"Honey, I want to go to sleep right now. Bye."

— Last words from Sandy Permana to his wife, Captain of the crashed Hercules.
- 2 June – 7 June – The 2015 Indonesia Super Series Premier is held in Jakarta.
- 10 June – After went missing from nearly a month, Engeline was found dead in her backyard, prompting widespread condemnation from the Indonesian media and speculations on whether someone behind the murder.

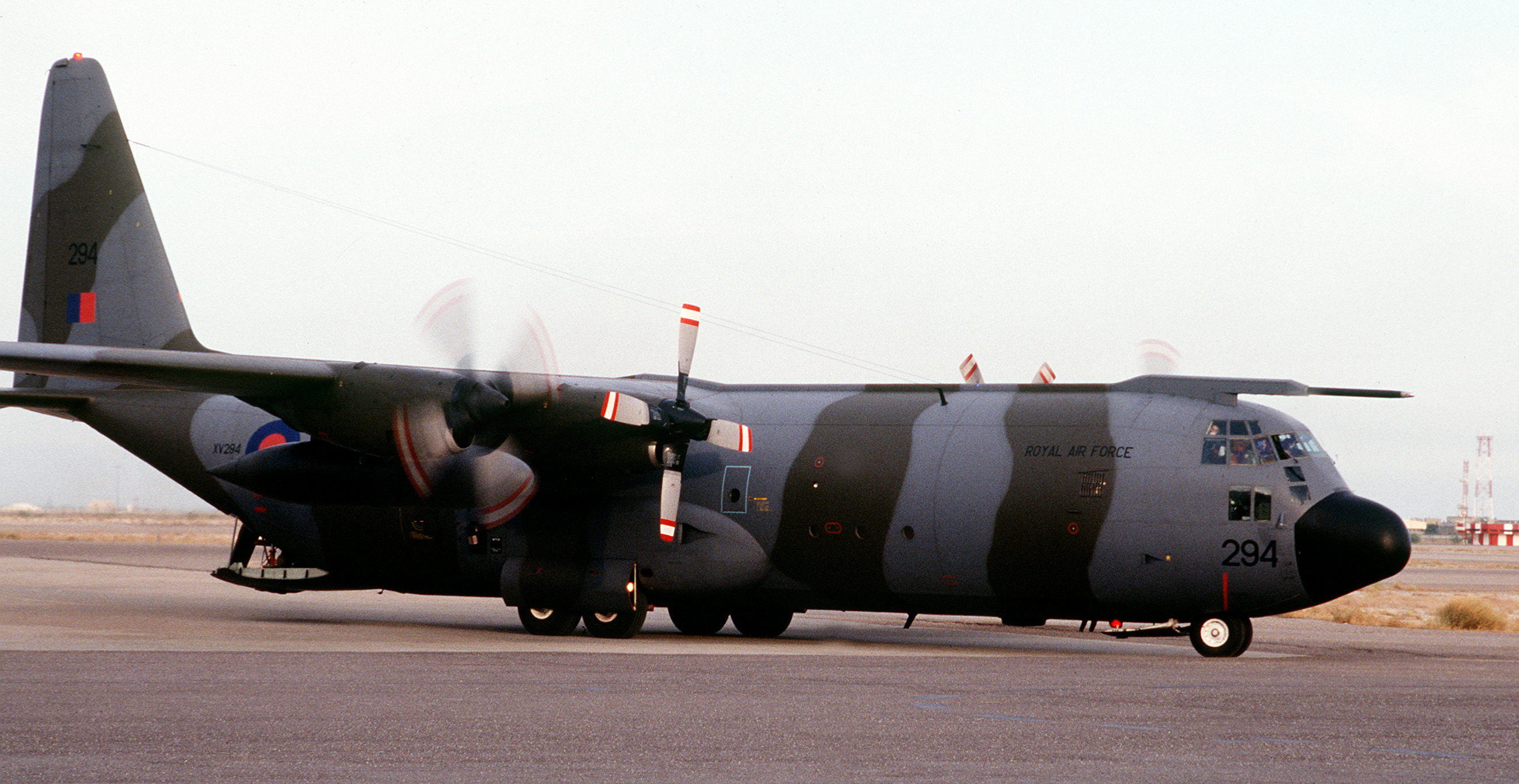
A Lockheed Hercules similar to the one involved in the deadliest air disaster in 2015 in Indonesia

- 30 June – A Lockheed C-130 Hercules operated by the Indonesian Air Force crashed onto a residential area in Medan, North Sumatra killing more than 140 people, marking the deadliest plane crash in Indonesian Air Force peacetime history and the second air disaster in Indonesia within six months.

=== July ===
- 9 July – A bomb exploded in a toilet at the Alam Sutera Mall in Tangerang, Banten. No one was killed or injured in the blast.
- 10 July – A massive explosion struck PT. Mandom, a perfume factory in Bekasi, West Java. At least 28 people were killed and 31 people were injured. Authorities suspected that a broken gas pipe caused a gas leak in the worker area, which subsequently caused the blast.
- 14 July – Twelve people were killed when a bus carrying dozens of passengers while celebrating the Eid Al-Fitr holiday on the Palimanan-Kanci toll flipped over and hit a bridge.
- 16 July – 22 July – A strombolian volcano in East Java, Mount Raung, erupted for the first time since the 1900s. The eruption later caused a massive delay and cancellation on flights, especially on the resort island of Bali.
- 28 July – The 7.0 M_{w} Papua earthquake affected Mamberamo Raya Regency with a maximum Mercalli intensity of VII (Very strong). One person was killed and some buildings were damaged or destroyed.

=== August ===
- 2 August – A student in Bekasi, West Java has died during the student orientation programme. The incident caused some controversies in the Indonesian government, whether to prohibit the programme or not.
- 3 August – A large explosion occurred in a housing complex in Makassar, killing two women and critically injured the other three. Three houses were also heavily damaged by the blast. Even though the police haven't officially announced the cause of such event, it was suspected that a fish bomb was planted in the area.
- 12 August – A Komala Air PAC 750 carrying six people crashed before landing at Ninia Airport, killing one onboard and injuring five others.
- 16 August
  - An ATR-42 carrying 54 people, operated by Trigana Air Service loses contact with air traffic controller in Indonesia's Papua region.
  - Six foreigners were reported missing while diving in Sangalaki Island in East Kalimantan.

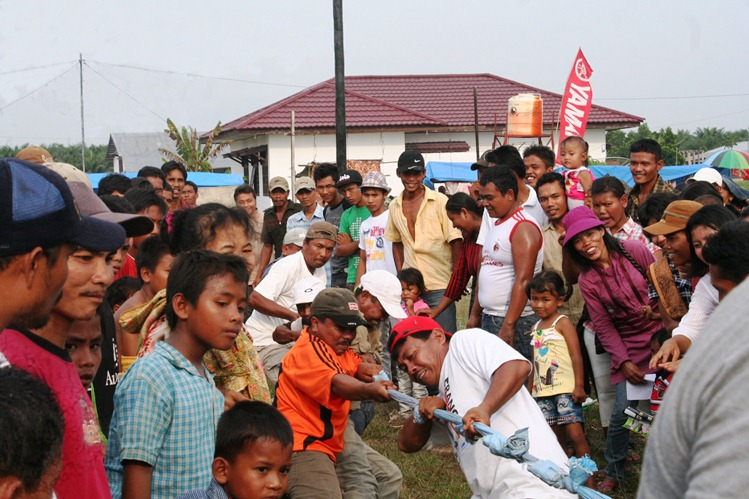
Celebrations and festivals as Indonesia celebrates its 70th anniversary

- 17 August
  - Indonesia celebrates its 70th birthday.

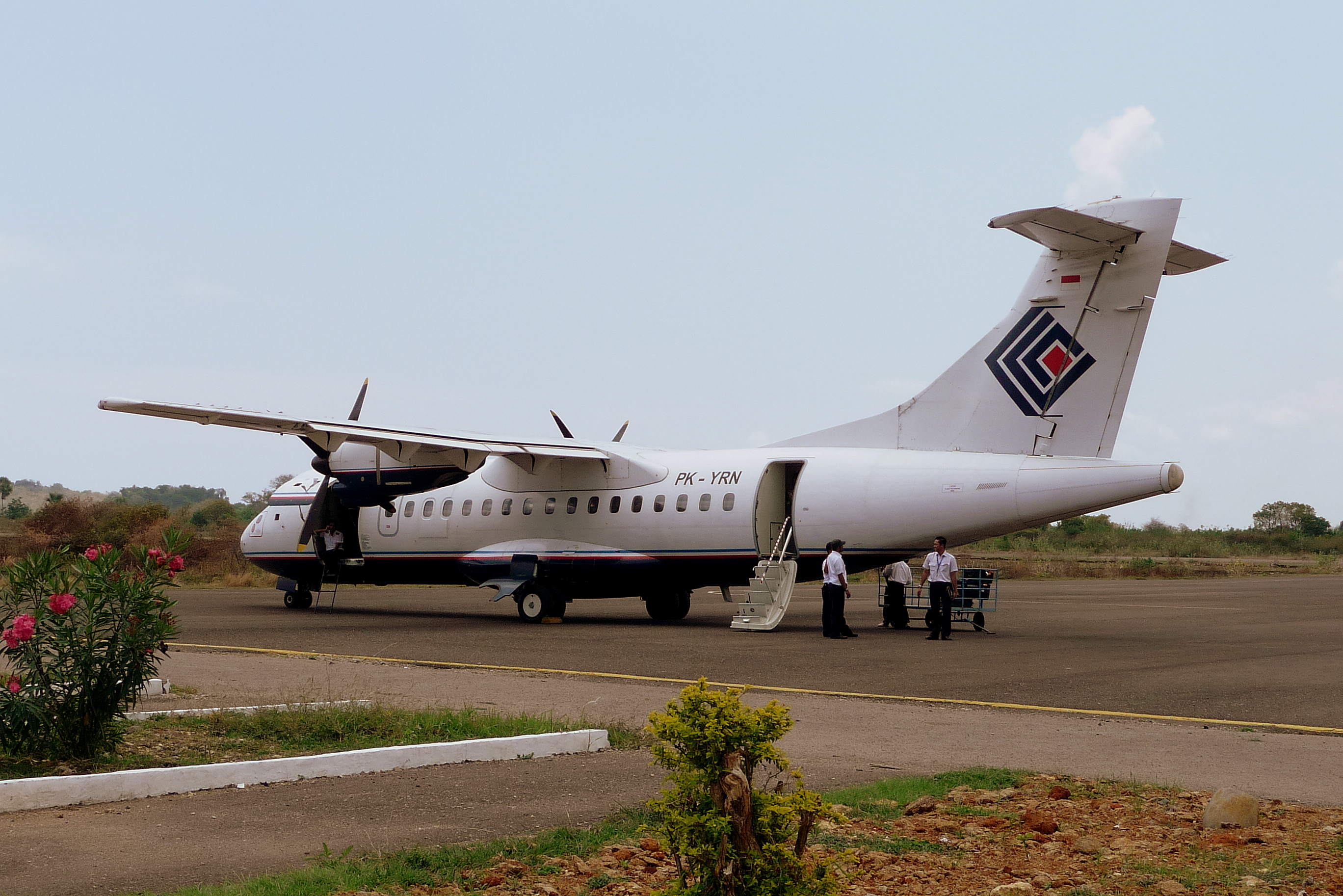
The aircraft that slammed into Mount Tangok in the deadliest plane crash involving the ATR-42

  - Trigana Air Service Flight 267 was found slammed into the mountainside of Mount Tangok in Papua. All 54 people on board died.
- 23 August – The once famously known as the world's dirtiest river was revitalized and cleaned to almost pristine by Jakarta Government.
- 24 August – Indonesia's Rupiah plunged to Rp. 14000 per USD in response to Black Monday, the lowest since 1997 Asian financial crisis, along with some stock market crashes around the world.

=== September ===
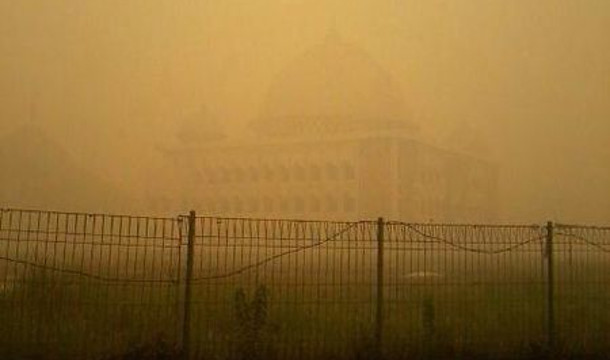
The worst environmental disaster in 2015, the 2015 Southeast Asian Haze, began in Indonesia

- 5 September – A ship carrying around 80 Indonesian workers sank off the coast of Malaysia. Around 20 people were found survived the incident. The rest were announced dead.
- 10 September – Haze in Sumatra and Borneo are getting worse. Most flights were cancelled in Dumai, Pekanbaru, Batam and Palembang.
- 17 September – Gabriella Sheryl Howard, also an 8-year-old girl, was founded sink at Global Sevilla Puri Indah School, Jakarta.
- 23 September – Two commuter train collided head on in Juanda Train Station, Surabaya. As the result forty-two people were injured in the incident. Miraculously, no one was killed.
- 25 September – An earthquake with a moment magnitude of 6.8 and depth of 10 km struck Sorong, Papua. The shaking was felt as far away as Manokwari. Around 62 people were injured and 57 houses were damaged. Reconstruction would cost billions of rupiah.
- 28 September – An anti illegal mining activist was murdered in Lumajang, Indonesia. It was the first killing of an activist since the killing of Munir in 2004.
- 30 September – An image of a dead baby killed due to haze with her mother has gone viral in social media.

=== October ===
- 2 October – a Twin Otter DHC-6, registered as PK-BRM, operated by Aviastar, disappeared above the Island of Sulawesi with 10 people on board.
- 5 October – Aviastar Flight 7503 was found crashed into the mountainside of Latimojong, all aboard were perished. It became the 4th Indonesian air tragedy in just 10 months.
- 7 October – After a series of downturn, finally the rupiah has strengthening in the wake of the weakening of U.S. Dollars.
- 11 October – A Eurocopter EC130 flying from Samosir Island to Kualanamu International Airport with five people on board went missing. It was suspected that the plane had crashed into Lake Toba.
- 13 October – After two days of fighting for survival, Fransiskus Susbihardayan, the only sole survivor of the crash was found alive from the missing Eurocopter. The others were still missing
- 18 October – Persib Bandung claimed victory in the final of 2015 President Cup.
- 19 October – A raging forest fire in Mount Lawu, Central Java caused by bonfire trapped several hikers. Seven hikers were burned to death.
- 25 October – Twelve people were killed due to suspected smoke inhalation and seventy one were injured after a fire occurred in a karaoke club in Manado, North Sulawesi. Most of them were trapped on the third floor and in karaoke rooms as the fire broke out on the second floor.
- 28 October – A bomb exploded in a canteen toilet in Alam Sutera mall, causing injury to one person. It was the second terror attack in the mall. The bomb was suspected to be smuggled in the paper holder inside the toilet.
- 29 October – The perpetrator of the bombing of Alam Sutera mall has been caught by the Indonesian National Police.

=== November ===
- 4 November – A strong 6.2 magnitude earthquake struck the island of Alor. Around 214 houses were damaged, one person was reported to have broken bones.
- 6 November
  - A Boeing 737 operated by Batik Air overran the runway in Adisucipto International Airport in Yogyakarta. No injuries were reported among 161 passengers.
  - A large criminal group, wanted for many years by the police, called 'Mama Minta Pulsa', had been caught in Cianjur, West Java.
- 7 November – Four people were killed after being struck by lightning in a camping grounds. Few others were injured.

The moment MV Wihan Sejahtera capsizes in the Java Sea

- 16 November – MV Wihan Sejahtera capsizes in Surabaya. Everyone onboard made out alive.
- 21 November – A magnitude 6.0 earthquake rocks the islands of Maluku. Even though no one was killed, more than 500 houses were damaged.
- 29 November – A ferry operated by BatamFast collided with a floating object in Singapore strait. The ferry was carrying 97 passengers in which 51 of them were Singaporean. None of the onboard killed.

=== December ===
- 3 December – 11 people were killed when an Isuzu Elf crashed into a truck in Cikopo-Palimanan toll.
- 6 December
  - In Muara Angke, Jakarta, a metromini bus crosses a rail track in a rail intersection when a train were going to pass 50 meters from them. The train hit them, and the bus split into two. The force of the impact was so massive that some of the bodies were mutilated. The train goes into a stop 200 meters from the point of impact. None of the passengers in the train were injured, but 18 people were killed in the bus. Thirteen of them died instantly, five others while in hospital. The six remaining survivors still in serious injuries.
  - A truck slammed another truck in Cikopo-Palimanan toll, killing two. Less than an hour later, a car, Daihatsu Luxio, carrying eleven people slammed into another car in the same toll. Six people were killed. The toll later nicknamed as the "Death Toll"
  - In Jakarta, another bus, suddenly flipped and crushed a pedestrian, killing him instantly.
  - In West Java, a military bus had a brake failure and accidentally run over two motorcycles. It came into a stop after hitting a car. Three people were killed due to the accident.
- 10 December – Indonesian Aerospace rolled out their first Indonesian aircraft since 1997's IPTN N-250, the Indonesian Aerospace N-219
- 19 December – MV Marina lost contact in the Gulf of Boni in South Sulawesi while carrying 122 people.
- Video of the Yogyakarta Air Show Crash
- 20 December
  - MV Marina was found listing and sinking in the Gulf of Boni. At this point everybody were still alive. However, bad weather hampers evacuation process.
  - A T-50 Golden Eagle operated by Indonesian Air Force crashes in Adisucipto International Airport in Yogyakarta, Indonesia. Both pilots killed after the plane swirling, spiraling and exploded.
- 23 December – A total of 55 people were drowned due to late evacuation process of MV Marina which was fatal as a result.
