= 2014 in Indonesia =

- Centuries: 19th; 20th; 21st
- Decades: 1990s; 2000s; 2010s; 2020s
- See also: History of Indonesia; Timeline of Indonesian history; List of years in Indonesia

The following lists events that happened during 2014 in Indonesia.

== Incumbents ==
- President: Susilo Bambang Yudhoyono (until 20 October), Joko Widodo (starting 20 October)
- Vice President: Boediono (until 20 October), Jusuf Kalla (starting 20 October)
- Chief Justice: Muhammad Hatta Ali

== Events ==
=== January ===
- January 1 – Police exchange gunfire with suspected militants near Jakarta, killing six people.
- January 1 – Sinabung volcano erupts, displacing more than 19,000 people.
- January 17 – Australia apologizes to Indonesia for breaching its territorial waters while conducting operations against people smugglers in Operation Sovereign Borders.
- January 20 – Monsoon rains cause flooding in Jakarta, causing 17 deaths and the evacuation of more than 30,000 people.
- January 20 – Hong Kong arrests an employer for abusing an Indonesian maid which resulted in protests by migrant workers from Indonesia and the Philippines in the Chinese territory.
- January 24 – Landslides in Kudus District, Central Java, caused by seasonal heavy rain, kill at least 12 villagers when mud and rocks bury homes in the area.
- January 28 – Two landslides triggered by torrential rain in Mekarsari village, Jombang District, East Java, kills at least 19 people and leaves 10 missing.

=== February ===
- February 1 – Mount Sinabung erupts killing 14 people.
- February 7 – Schapelle Corby is granted parole (along with 1,290 others) in Indonesia after serving nine years in a Bali prison for drug smuggling.
- February 13 – Mount Kelud erupts prompting the evacuation of 200,000 people on Java.
- February 14 – The eruption of Mount Kelud on the island of Java causes the closure of airports in three cities Surabaya, Yogyakarta and Solo as well as the reported death of two people.
- February 24 – The death toll in the Papua province reaches 11 people as torrential rain continues to form floods and landslides, occurring since Saturday.

=== May ===
- May 10 — The General Elections Commission completes the national recapitulation and formally determines the results of the 2014 Indonesian legislative election for the DPR, DPD, and regional legislatures.

=== September ===
- September 18 — 22nd The Indonesia International Motor Show (IIMS) 18-28 September 2014 JiExpo Kemayoran Jakarta Barat in Jakarta

=== October ===
- October 1 — Cabinet Indonesia President Joko Widodo and 2014 - 2019 Vice President Marty Natalegawa from Susilo Bambang Yudhoyono and Ani Yudhoyono 2004 - 2014 Vice Boediono 2009 - 2014 Cabinet Sudi Silalahi Minister and of Indonesia Zulkifli Hasan

=== November ===
- November 14 — Indonesia vs Australia President Indonesia Tony Abbott and Joko Widodo Prime Minister G-20 Summits Australian

=== December ===
- December 13 – Caused by heavy rain, the Banjarnegara landslides kill at least 93 people, with 23 unaccounted for and presumed dead.
- December 19 – The Gamalama erupts injuring four people and leaving one person missing.
- December 28 – Indonesia AirAsia Flight 8501 was an en route route from Surabaya to Singapore and went missing somewhere in the Java Sea.
- December 30 – After two days of uncertainty, Flight 8501 was found crashed onto the Java Sea in Karimata Strait. A live television footage (which caused a mass hysteria) purportedly shows a body floating on the water, confirming the crash of the flight. All 162 people on board were dead. Making it the most deadliest accident in 2014. The site was near Borneo in Indonesia at the Karimata Strait. However, it was revealed that the Indonesia AirAsia did not have permission to fly the Surabaya-Singapore route on that Sunday.
