= 2012 Indonesian Air Force Fokker F27 crash =

Aviation accident in Jakarta, Indonesia

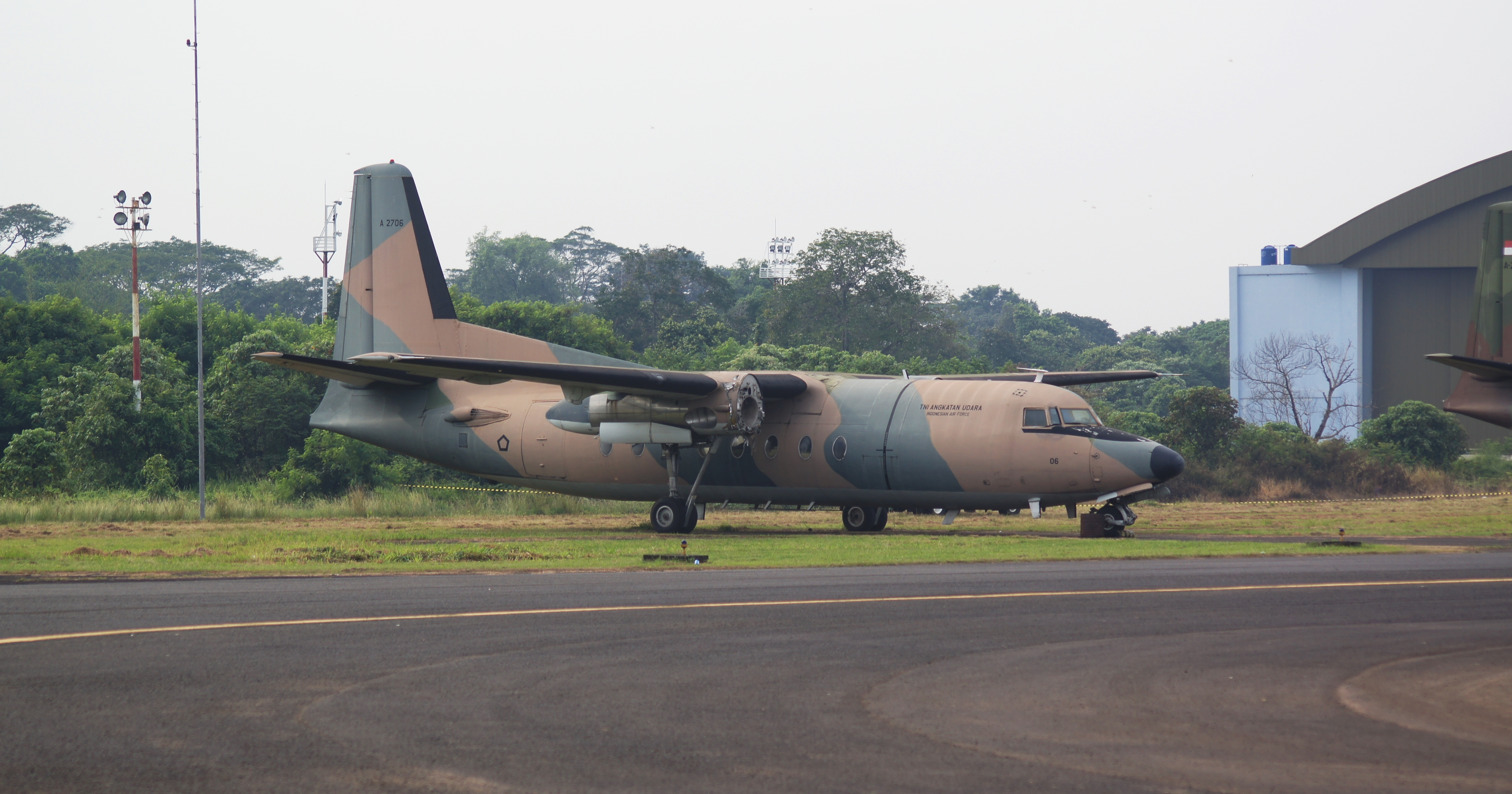
- A Fokker F27 similar to the one involved in the accident

Accident
- Date: 21 June 2012
- Summary: Crashed into hanger on landing
- Site: 6°16′S 106°53′E
- Total fatalities: 11
- Total injuries: 11

Aircraft
- Aircraft type: Fokker F27
- Operator: Indonesian Air Force
- Registration: A-2708
- Flight origin: Jakarta, Indonesia
- Destination: Jakarta
- Occupants: 7
- Crew: 7
- Fatalities: 7
- Survivors: 0

Ground casualties
- Ground fatalities: 4
- Ground injuries: 11

On 21 June 2012, a Fokker F27 military transport aircraft of the Indonesian Air Force crashed into a housing complex near Halim Airport in Jakarta, Indonesia, while conducting a training flight. All seven people on board, four people on the ground were killed and 11 more injured.

== Accident ==
The F27 was on a training flight when it crashed while trying to land. Officials previously said that the aircraft crew had been conducting a touch-and-go exercise before the crash. The aircraft was not equipped with flight data recorders.

== Aircraft ==
The plane was built in 1958 and used by the Air Force for the past several years. TNI has said that it is in the process of procuring CN-295s to replace its Fokker F27s.
