= Who Wants to Be a Millionaire Hot Seat (Indonesian game show) =

- Presented by: Ferdi Hasan
- Country of origin: Indonesia

Production
- Running time: 30 minutes

Original release
- Network: RCTI
- Release: September 13 – October 31, 2010

Who Wants to Be a Millionaire Hot Seat is an Indonesian game show. It based on Australian game show Millionaire Hot Seat. It premiered on RCTI on September 13, 2010. The host was Ferdi Hasan. Despite its name, the top prize was a quarter of a billion Indonesian rupiah, however after September 19, the top prize was increased to half a billion rupiah, and the money tree was changed. It can be earned by answering 15 multiple-choice questions correctly. The only lifeline was pass.

October 31, 2010, was the last day the show aired on RCTI.

Unlike the previous two 'classic' Millionaire ever aired in Indonesia, this time the format used is the Hot Seat format, similar to the Australian version. Several of the first five questions usually have three joke answers and one correct answer.

== Money tree ==
Payout structure
Question number	Question value	
Question number	Episodes 1–6	Episodes 7–49
15	Rp 250,000,000	Rp 500,000,000
14	Rp 50,000,000	Rp 250,000,000
13	Rp 25,000,000	Rp 100,000,000
12	Rp 15,000,000	Rp 50,000,000
11	Rp 12,000,000	Rp 30,000,000
10	Rp 10,000,000	Rp 20,000,000
9	Rp 8,000,000	Rp 15,000,000
8	Rp 6,000,000	Rp 12,000,000
7	Rp 4,000,000	Rp 9,000,000
6	Rp 2,000,000	Rp 7,000,000
5	Rp 1,000,000	Rp 5,000,000
4	Rp 500,000	Rp 4,000,000
3	Rp 400,000	Rp 3,000,000
2	Rp 300,000	Rp 2,000,000
1	Rp 200,000	Rp 1,000,000
Milestone (Note: The fifth question milestone is only applicable for the final contestant) Top prize
