= Asmara (TV series) =

- Created by: SinemArt
- Directed by: Desiana Larasati
- Starring: Velove Vexia; Glenn Alinskie; Yasmine Wildblood; Fero Walandouw
- Theme music composer: Michael Christian
- Opening theme: Yang No. 1, D'Bagindas
- Ending theme: Yang No. 1, D'Bagindas
- Composer: Kafka Nafisa
- Country of origin: Indonesia
- Original language: Indonesian
- No. of seasons: 1
- No. of episodes: 24

Production
- Production location: Jakarta
- Running time: 1 hours

Original release
- Network: RCTI; Astro Aruna
- Release: April 30 – May 23, 2012

Asmara (Love) is an Indonesian soap opera television series that aired on RCTI daily at 7:00 p.m. in 2012. Produced by SinemArt, it starred Velove Vexia, Glenn Alinskie, Yasmine Wildblood, Fero Walandouw, Arifin Putra, and others.

== Cast ==
- Velove Vexia as Asmara
- Yasmin Wildblood as Cinta
- Tsania Marwa as Flora
- Alice Norin as Nora
- Fero Walandouw as Petir
- Glenn Alinskie as Januari
- Arifin Putra as Don
- Atalarik Syah as Praja
- Jihan Fahira as Anya
- Ponco Buwono as Dhamar
- Ana Pinem as Inem
- Tengku Firmansyah as Maulana
- Marini Zumarnis as Asti
