= 2010 West Papua floods =

The 2010 West Papua floods occurred on 6 October 2010 in the eastern Indonesian province of West Papua. The floods, which have centered on the town of Wasior in West Papua, resulted from heavy rains resulted in a river overflowing its banks, causing landslides.

At least 145 people have reported to have been killed in the floods, as of October 12, 2010.

Indonesian President Susilo Bambang Yudhoyono visited the area on October 12, 2010. Many survivors have been evacuated to the city of Manokwari. Large amounts of aid had been mistakenly sent to the town of Wasior in the aftermath of the flooding, despite the mass relocation of the relocation of its residents to Manokwari. Officials and NGOs blamed miscommunications for the mistake.

As of December 2010, there were plans to relocate 5,100, or around 7,900 people, to temporary settlements as part of a relocation program for people affected by the floods.

The government of Indonesia has blamed heavy rains for the severe flooding, rather than illegal logging and deforestation by locals.
