= 2016 AFF Championship Group A =

Group A was one of the two groups of the 2016 AFF Championship. It consisted of hosts the Philippines, Thailand, Singapore and Indonesia. Play in Group A began on 19 November and ended on 25 November.

== Teams ==
Draw position	Team	Appearance	Previous best performance	FIFA World Rankings (as of 20 October 2016)
A1	Philippines (H)	10th	Semi-finalists (2010, 2012, 2014)	124
A2	Thailand	11th	Winners (1996, 2000, 2002, 2014)	146
A3	Singapore	11th	Winners (1998, 2004, 2007, 2012)	171
A4	Indonesia	11th	Runners-up (2000, 2002, 2004, 2010)	179

== Group standings ==
Pos	Team	Pld	W	D	L	GF	GA	GD	Pts	Qualification
1	Thailand	3	3	0	0	6	2	+4	9	Advance to knockout stage
2	Indonesia	3	1	1	1	6	7	−1	4	Advance to knockout stage
3	Philippines (H)	3	0	2	1	2	3	−1	2	
4	Singapore	3	0	1	2	1	3	−2	1	

Source: AFF
(H) Hosts

In the semi-finals:

- Thailand advanced to play against Myanmar (runners-up of Group B).
- Indonesia advanced to play against Vietnam (winners of Group B).

== Matches ==
All times are in local, Philippines Time (UTC+08:00).

=== Thailand vs Indonesia ===
19 November 2016
16:30

Thailand	4–2	Indonesia
Peerapat 4'; Teerasil 36', 79', 90+4'	Report	Boaz 53'; Lerby 56'

Philippine Sports Stadium, Bocaue
Attendance: 1,153
Referee: Valentin Kovalenko (Uzbekistan)

Thailand	Indonesia

GK	1	Kawin Thamsatchanan
RB	19	Tristan Do	(substituted off) 64'
CB	5	Adison Promrak
CB	16	Pratum Chuthong
LB	2	Peerapat Notchaiya	(substituted off) 72'
DM	17	Tanaboon Kesarat
DM	6	Sarach Yooyen
CM	21	Pokklaw Anan
RF	9	Siroch Chatthong	(substituted off) 83'
CF	10	Teerasil Dangda (c)
LF	18	Chanathip Songkrasin
Substitutions:
DF	15	Koravit Namwiset	(substituted on) 64'
DF	3	Theerathon Bunmathan	(substituted on) 72'
MF	7	Charyl Chappuis	(substituted on) 83'
Manager:
Kiatisuk Senamuang

GK	1	Kurnia Meiga
RB	2	Beny Wahyudi
CB	16	Fachrudin Aryanto
CB	13	Yanto Basna
LB	3	Abduh Lestaluhu
DM	19	Bayu Pradana	(substituted off) 90+1'
RM	21	Andik Vermansyah	(substituted off) 82'
LM	14	Rizky Pora
AM	12	Lerby Eliandry	(substituted off) 74'
CF	8	Stefano Lilipaly
CF	7	Boaz Solossa (c)
Substitutions:
FW	10	Zulham Zamrun	(substituted on) 74'
MF	6	Evan Dimas	(substituted on) 82'
FW	9	Ferdinand Sinaga	(substituted on) 90+1'
Manager:
(Austria) Alfred Riedl

Man of the Match:
Teerasil Dangda (Thailand)

Assistant referees:
Andrey Tsapenko (Uzbekistan)
Hsu Min-yu (Chinese Taipei)
Fourth official:
Yu Ming-hsun (Chinese Taipei)

Overall
Statistics	Thailand	Indonesia
Goals scored	4	2
Total shots	12	12
Shots on target	4	5
Ball possession	62%	38%
Corner kicks	4	4
Fouls committed	9	14
Offsides	1	3
Yellow cards	0	0
Red cards	0	0

=== Philippines vs Singapore ===
19 November 2016
20:00

Philippines	0–0	Singapore
	Report

Philippine Sports Stadium, Bocaue
Attendance: 4,339
Referee: Masoud Tufaylieh (Syria)

Philippines	Singapore

GK	15	Roland Müller
CB	14	Kevin Ingreso
CB	12	Amani Aguinaldo
CB	28	Jeffrey Christiaens
RM	9	Misagh Bahadoran		(substituted off) 58'
CM	5	Mike Ott	(yellow card) 85'
CM	8	Manuel Ott	(yellow card) 33'
CM	17	Stephan Schröck
LM	7	Iain Ramsay		(substituted off) 46'
CF	22	Kenshiro Daniels		(substituted off) 81'
CF	10	Phil Younghusband (c)
Substitutions:
FW	40	Hikaru Minegishi		(substituted on) 46'
FW	26	Mark Hartmann		(substituted on) 58'
DF	2	Junior Muñoz		(substituted on) 81'
Manager:
(United States) Thomas Dooley

GK	18	Hassan Sunny	(yellow card) 90+1'
CB	6	Madhu Mohana
CB	14	Hariss Harun (c)
CB	16	Daniel Bennett
RWB	9	Faritz Hameed		(substituted off) 77'
LWB	21	Safuwan Baharudin	(yellow card) 88'
RM	4	Juma'at Jantan		(substituted off) 64'
CM	25	Anumanthan Kumar	(yellow card) 80'
CM	28	Hafiz Abu Sujad	(red card) 34'
LM	2	Shakir Hamzah
CF	19	Khairul Amri		(substituted off) 90+4'
Substitutions:
FW	10	Faris Ramli		(substituted on) 64'
DF	5	Baihakki Khaizan		(substituted on) 77'
MF	24	Yasir Hanapi		(substituted on) 90+4'
Manager:
V. Sundramoorthy

Man of the Match:
N/A

Assistant referees:
Zakariya Kanat (Syria)
Samar Pal (India)
Fourth official:
Rowan Arumughan (India)

Overall
Statistics	Philippines	Singapore
Goals scored	0	0
Total shots	20	4
Shots on target	5	0
Ball possession	70%	30%
Corner kicks	9	3
Fouls committed	19	20
Offsides	4	0
Yellow cards	2	3
Red cards	0	1

=== Thailand vs Singapore ===
22 November 2016
16:30

Thailand	1–0	Singapore
Sarawut 89'	Report

Philippine Sports Stadium, Bocaue
Attendance: 359
Referee: Rowan Arumughan (India)

Thailand	Singapore

GK	1	Kawin Thamsatchanan
CB	17	Tanaboon Kesarat
CB	15	Koravit Namwiset
CB	6	Sarach Yooyen
CM	19	Tristan Do
CM	21	Pokklaw Anan	(substituted off) 86'
CM	3	Theerathon Bunmathan
RW	9	Siroch Chatthong	(substituted off) 63'
AM	18	Chanathip Songkrasin
LW	29	Rungrath Poomchantuek	(substituted off) 72'
CF	10	Teerasil Dangda (c)
Substitutions:
MF	14	Sarawut Masuk	(substituted on) 63'
DF	5	Adison Promrak	(substituted on) 72'
MF	7	Charyl Chappuis	(substituted on) 86'
Manager:
Kiatisuk Senamuang

GK	18	Hassan Sunny
CB	6	Madhu Mohana
CB	14	Hariss Harun (c)
CB	16	Daniel Bennett	(yellow card) 78'
RWB	9	Faritz Hameed	(yellow card) 14'
LWB	21	Safuwan Baharudin		(substituted off) 74'
CM	4	Juma'at Jantan		(substituted off) 82'
CM	25	Anumanthan Kumar		(substituted off) 90+2'
CM	2	Shakir Hamzah
SS	10	Faris Ramli
CF	19	Khairul Amri	(yellow card) 26'
Substitutions:
MF	13	Izzdin Shafiq		(substituted on) 74'
MF	24	Yasir Hanapi		(substituted on) 82'
FW	17	Shahril Ishak		(substituted on) 90+2'
Manager:
V. Sundramoorthy

Man of the Match:
Chanathip Songkrasin (Thailand)

Assistant referees:
Bang Ki-yeol (South Korea)
Andrey Tsapenko (Uzbekistan)
Fourth official:
Valentin Kovalenko (Uzbekistan)

Overall
Statistics	Thailand	Singapore
Goals scored	1	0
Total shots	13	7
Shots on target	4	3
Ball possession	81%	19%
Corner kicks	7	3
Fouls committed	4	19
Offsides	3	0
Yellow cards	0	3
Red cards	0	0

=== Indonesia vs Philippines ===
22 November 2016
20:00

Indonesia	2–2	Philippines
Fachrudin 7'; Boaz 68'	Report	Bahadoran 31'; P. Younghusband 82'

Philippine Sports Stadium, Bocaue
Attendance: 2,068
Referee: Yu Ming-hsun (Chinese Taipei)

Indonesia	Philippines

GK	1	Kurnia Meiga
RB	2	Beny Wahyudi
CB	16	Fachrudin Aryanto	(yellow card) 19'
CB	13	Yanto Basna	(yellow card) 80'
LB	3	Abduh Lestaluhu
CM	21	Andik Vermansyah		(substituted off) 78'
CM	6	Evan Dimas	(yellow card) 72'	(substituted off) 81'
CM	14	Rizky Pora
RF	8	Stefano Lilipaly	(yellow card) 73'
CF	12	Lerby Eliandry		(substituted off) 87'
LF	7	Boaz Solossa (c)
Substitutions:
FW	10	Zulham Zamrun		(substituted on) 78'
MF	19	Bayu Pradana		(substituted on) 81'
FW	9	Ferdinand Sinaga		(substituted on) 87'
Manager:
(Austria) Alfred Riedl

GK	15	Roland Müller
RB	21	Martin Steuble
CB	12	Amani Aguinaldo
CB	14	Kevin Ingreso
LB	28	Jeffrey Christiaens
RM	9	Misagh Bahadoran
CM	8	Manuel Ott		(substituted off) 75'
LM	40	Hikaru Minegishi		(substituted off) 55'
AM	5	Mike Ott		(substituted off) 75'
AM	17	Stephan Schröck
CF	10	Phil Younghusband (c)
Substitutions:
MF	7	Iain Ramsay		(substituted on) 55'
FW	4	OJ Porteria	(yellow card) 87'	(substituted on) 75'
FW	26	Mark Hartmann	(yellow card) 85'	(substituted on) 75'
Manager:
(United States) Thomas Dooley

Man of the Match:
Phil Younghusband (Philippines)

Assistant referees:
Hsu Min-yu (Chinese Taipei)
Zakariya Kanat (Syria)
Fourth official:
Masoud Tufaylieh (Syria)

Overall
Statistics	Indonesia	Philippines
Goals scored	2	2
Total shots	17	16
Shots on target	10	8
Ball possession	38%	62%
Corner kicks	5	6
Fouls committed	13	13
Offsides	5	1
Yellow cards	4	2
Red cards	0	0

=== Singapore vs Indonesia ===
25 November 2016
20:00

Singapore	1–2	Indonesia
Khairul 27'	Report	Andik 62'; Lilipaly 85'

Rizal Memorial Stadium, Manila
Attendance: 467
Referee: Masoud Tufaylieh (Syria)

Singapore	Indonesia

GK	18	Hassan Sunny
RB	9	Faritz Hameed
CB	14	Hariss Harun (c)
CB	24	Yasir Hanapi		(substituted off) 76'
LB	21	Safuwan Baharudin
DM	6	Madhu Mohana
DM	16	Daniel Bennett
CM	25	Anumanthan Kumar		(substituted off) 84'
RF	10	Faris Ramli		(substituted off) 90+1'
CF	19	Khairul Amri
LF	2	Shakir Hamzah	(yellow card) 7'
Substitutions:
FW	17	Shahril Ishak		(substituted on) 76'
MF	29	Shahfiq Ghani		(substituted on) 84'
FW	7	Gabriel Quak		(substituted on) 90+1'
Manager:
V. Sundramoorthy

GK	1	Kurnia Meiga
CB	16	Fachrudin Aryanto	(yellow card) 43'
CB	19	Bayu Pradana
CB	13	Yanto Basna	(yellow card) 89'
RWB	2	Beny Wahyudi		(substituted off) 74'
LWB	3	Abduh Lestaluhu
CM	21	Andik Vermansyah
CM	6	Evan Dimas		(substituted off) 58'
CM	14	Rizky Pora		(substituted off) 78'
CF	8	Stefano Lilipaly
CF	7	Boaz Solossa (c)	(yellow card) 68'
Substitutions:
FW	9	Ferdinand Sinaga		(substituted on) 58'
MF	25	Manahati Lestusen		(substituted on) 74'
FW	10	Zulham Zamrun		(substituted on) 78'
Manager:
(Austria) Alfred Riedl

Man of the Match:
Stefano Lilipaly (Indonesia)

Assistant referees:
Zakariya Kanat (Syria)
Hsu Min-yu (Chinese Taipei)
Fourth official:
Yu Ming-hsun (Chinese Taipei)

Overall
Statistics	Singapore	Indonesia
Goals scored	1	2
Total shots	16	24
Shots on target	4	10
Ball possession	37%	63%
Corner kicks	2	2
Fouls committed	16	13
Offsides	2	4
Yellow cards	1	3
Red cards	0	0

=== Philippines vs Thailand ===
25 November 2016
20:00

Philippines	0–1	Thailand
	Report	Sarawut 81'

Philippine Sports Stadium, Bocaue
Attendance: 3,185
Referee: Valentin Kovalenko (Uzbekistan)

Philippines	Thailand

GK	15	Roland Müller
CB	21	Martin Steuble
CB	12	Amani Aguinaldo
CB	28	Jeffrey Christiaens
RWB	35	Marco Casambre		(substituted off) 79'
LWB	40	Hikaru Minegishi		(substituted off) 46'
CM	5	Mike Ott
CM	8	Manuel Ott
CM	17	Stephan Schröck	(yellow card) 90+1'
CF	22	Kenshiro Daniels		(substituted off) 46'
CF	10	Phil Younghusband (c)
Substitutions:
FW	23	James Younghusband		(substituted on) 46'
FW	9	Misagh Bahadoran		(substituted on) 46'
MF	14	Kevin Ingreso		(substituted on) 79'
Manager:
(United States) Thomas Dooley

GK	20	Sinthaweechai Hathairattanakool (c)
CB	5	Adison Promrak	(yellow card) 67'
CB	36	Pravinwat Boonyong
CB	15	Koravit Namwiset
RM	14	Sarawut Masuk		(substituted off) 90'
CM	12	Adul Lahsoh
CM	35	Prakit Deeprom	(yellow card) 90+4'
CM	7	Charyl Chappuis
LM	4	Kroekrit Thaweekarn	(yellow card) 23'
CF	11	Mongkol Tossakrai		(substituted off) 86'
CF	2	Peerapat Notchaiya
Substitutions:
FW	29	Rungrath Poomchantuek		(substituted on) 86'
FW	9	Siroch Chatthong		(substituted on) 90'
Manager:
Kiatisuk Senamuang

Man of the Match:
Sinthaweechai Hathairattanakool (Thailand)

Assistant referees:
Samar Pal (India)
Bang Ki-yeol (South Korea)
Fourth official:
Rowan Arumughan (India)

Overall
Statistics	Philippines	Thailand
Goals scored	0	1
Total shots	21	14
Shots on target	8	5
Ball possession	48%	52%
Corner kicks	6	11
Fouls committed	16	10
Offsides	2	3
Yellow cards	1	3
Red cards	0	0
