= Minute to Win It Indonesia =

Indonesian game show

- Genre: Game show
- Created by: Friday TV
- Based on: Minute to Win It
- Developed by: Mattias Olsson; Jock Millgårdh
- Presented by: Andhika Pratama
- Theme music composer: Jess Bailey & Graeme Perkins (based on UK's Minute to Win It)
- Country of origin: Indonesia
- Original language: Indonesian
- No. of episodes: 26

Production
- Production locations: MNC Studios, RCTI Complex, Jl. Raya Perjuangan No. 1, Kebon Jeruk, West Jakarta
- Running time: 60 minutes
- Production company: Endemol Shine Group (now Banijay Entertainment)

Original release
- Network: MNCTV
- Release: 17 July 2017 – 8 January 2018

Related
- MasterChef Indonesia (RCTI); Deal Or No Deal Indonesia: 1st season (RCTI, 2007-08); 2nd season (ANTV, 2011-12); 3rd season (Global TV, 2014-15); Who Wants to Be a Millionaire Indonesia: Original version (RCTI, 2001-06); Super Milyarder 3 Milyar (ANTV, 2006-07); Hot Seat (RCTI, 2010)

Minute to Win It Indonesia is an Indonesian game show that was adapted from the Minute to Win It format created by Friday TV, NBCUniversal and Endemol Shine Group. The show premiered on MNCTV from 17 July 2017 to 8 January 2018 and airs every Monday at 16.30 Western Indonesian Time. The host for this version was Andhika Pratama

In addition to its own version of Minute to Win It, MNCTV have also rebroadcast the first American version of Minute to WIn It.

== Gameplay ==
- The gameplay is basically same as the American version and other international versions of the show.
- Contestants take part in a series of 60-second challenges that use objects that are commonly available around the house and will be faced with blueprints to give an instructions of the game.
- Contestants must complete the first game to win the first level with a prize Rp1.000.000, and the process is repeated for the next level. Contestant that completed all 10 games will won the grand prize which is Rp100,000,000.
- The difficulty of the games progressively increase throughout the show. If time expires or contestants didn't fulfill the conditions of the game (such as by the contestant exhausting any allotted attempts or committing a foul), the contestant loses a "life". Contestant that loses all three of their "lives" will have the game ends and the contestant's winnings drop to the previous safety level they passed.
- After successfully completing a game, the contestant can leave with the amount of money already won before seeing the blueprint for the next game. If the contestant elects for the game, the contestant must keep playing until that game is complete or they have exhausted all three of their "lives".

=== Money tree ===
if the contestant(s) clear the safe levels (stylized in bold and lime green background), the contestant will guaranteed to leave with no less than the cash value for that level.

Level	Value
**1**	**Rp1,000,000**
2	Rp2,000,000
**3**	**Rp5,000,000**
4	Rp7,500,000
**5**	**Rp10,000,000**
6	Rp15,000,000
7	Rp25,000,000
**8**	**Rp50,000,000**
9	Rp75,000,000
**10**	**Rp100,000,000**
