= Katakan Katamu =

- Presented by: Ben Kasyafani
- Narrated by: Budi Iskandar
- Country of origin: Indonesia
- Original language: Indonesian
- No. of episodes: 214

Production
- Running time: 60 minutes (with commercials)
- Production company: FremantleMedia

Original release
- Network: ANTV
- Release: 4 October 2010 – 17 June 2011

Related
- Komunikata (TPI, 2000-2005)

Katakan Katamu (lit. Say Your Say) is the Indonesian format of television game show Bruce Forsyth's Hot Streak. In this quiz, 4 teams (2 boys and 2 girls), 5 persons for each team, will examined the knowledge of the vocabulary and played in single-elimination tournament mode. Katakan Katamu is aired on ANTV from 4 October 2010 to 17 June 2011, hosted by Ben Kasyafani. Previously aired on TPI (now MNCTV) in 5 years renamed Komunikata (2000-2005).

== Showtime ==
Start	End	Day and time
4 October 2010	22 October 2010	Monday-Friday, 5.30 pm - 6.30 pm
25 October 2010	25 December 2010	Monday-Sunday, 5:30 pm - 6.30 pm
27 December 2010	20 May 2011	Monday-Friday, 5:30 pm - 6.30 pm
20 May 2011	17 June 2011	Wednesday-Friday, 5:30 pm - 6.30 pm

== Preliminary round ==
Preliminary round is played twice, each game plays a katakan katamu round and a tebak gaya round.

=== Katakan Katamu (Give your Words) ===
Two gender-specific teams of five contestants each compete in a game of word association. The challengers, or winners of a coin toss in the case of two new teams, play first. In round one, the captain of the team in control chooses one of two words presented by the host. The other four team members wear headphones to ensure they could not hear the word. The opposing team played the other word in the round. Once a word was chosen, the team was given 40 seconds to communicate the word down the line. The team captain describes the word to the second team member, who, after guessing the word, then does the same for the third team member. The process continues down the line until the team completes the transition down the line, time runs out, the team gave an illegal clue, using trademarks, using a foreign language, repeated a key word, gestured or said the word (or a form of the word).

=== Tebak gaya (Guess the Mimic) ===
In this round, 8 categories that played (each played by 2 teams in the first and second half, which contained 4 categories, and each team played each 2 categories). Each categories has 5 words. This round is played turnly, started from the lowest-score team. Each round played in 60 seconds. Team captain acted as illustrator. The rules: do not making noise, do not showing the things from question word, only moving the body. The word that guessed correctly will be given 10 points. The winning team will advance to the playoff round. If the both team have a same score, will playing tie-break round. This round only playing with 1 category and 1 word. If lose the game, other team will win the game.

== Playoff round ==
The two last round winners would be in only 2 segments, which is the words only round, and the mimic only round. The episode's winning team later will be played for Rp.12 million .

== Sikat habis (Clean up) ==
This round only played by the winners from the play-off round. This round will playing with 3 categories. Captain team will giving 4 words that related with this category and other 4 teams using headphone and standing up turning back from viewers to prevent cheating. After the captain give 4 related words, 4 teammates take off the headphone and standing up facing viewers.

=== Prizes ===
For the regular edition: (Monday-Thursday)

- 1st category: Each guessed words will be given Rp500.000,00. All 4 guessed words will given Rp2.000.000,00. Played in 20 seconds. Each person has 5 seconds to guess the related words.
- 2nd category: Each guessed words will be given Rp1.000.000,00. All 4 guessed words will be given Rp4.000.000,00. If totalled, the money in present are Rp6.000.000,00. Played in 20 seconds. Each person has 5 seconds to guess the related words.
- 3rd category: If 4 member teams guessing all the words, the prize will be doubled become Rp12.000.000,00. If there one word unguessed, captain team only getting the prize that formulated from 1st category prize add 2nd category prize. Played in 16 seconds. Each person has 4 seconds to guess the related words.

But, the format of the celebrity edition (Katakan Katamu Bintang-Bintang) is different.

- 1st category: Each guessed words will be given Rp500.000,00. All 4 guessed words will given Rp2.000.000,00. Played in 20 seconds. Each person has 5 seconds to guess the related words.
- 2nd category: Each guessed words will be given Rp500.000,00. All 4 guessed words will given Rp2.000.000,00. If totalled, the money in present are Rp4.000.000,00. Played in 20 seconds. Each person has 5 seconds to guess the related words.
- 3rd category: Each guessed words will be given Rp1.000.000,00. All 4 guessed words will given Rp4.000.000,00. If totalled, the money in present are Rp8.000.000,00. Played in 20 seconds. Each person has 5 seconds to guess the related words.
- 4th category: If 4 member teams guessing all the words, the prize will be doubled become Rp16.000.000,00. If there is one word unguessed, captain team only gets the prize that formulated from 1st category prize add 2nd category prize add 3rd category prize. Played in 16 seconds. Each person has 4 seconds to guess the related words.

== See also ==
- antv
- Bruce Forsyth's Hot Streak
