= Multiply (website) =

Social networking website

- Website type: e-commerce
- Available in: English, Indonesian, Japanese, Thai, Spanish, Portuguese
- Dissolved: March 21, 2013
- Owner: Stefan Magdalinski
- Website: http://multiply.com/
- Commercial: Yes
- Registration: Free
- Launched: December 2003
- Current status: Defunct/Inactive (as a social networking site); Closed (as a site on March 21, 2013; as a company on April 1, 2015)

Multiply was an American then Indonesian social networking service with an emphasis on allowing users to share media – such as photos, videos and blog entries – with their "real-world" network. The website was launched in March 2004 and was privately held with backing by VantagePoint Venture Partners, Point Judith Capital, Transcosmos, and private investors. Multiply had over 11 million registered users. The company was headquartered in Boca Raton, Florida but moved to Jakarta, Indonesia early in 2012 and recently announced intentions to switch to e-commerce, dropping the social networking aspect entirely. Quantcast estimates Multiply had 2.47 million monthly U.S. unique visitors at their peak on July 30, 2012.

On Multiply, a user's network is made up of their direct contacts, as well as others who are closely connected to them through their first-degree relationships. Additionally, users were encouraged to specify the nature of their relationship with one another, making it possible to share content with their entire network of closely related people, or subsets thereof including friends, family, professional contacts, and so on.

The site was closed on March 21, 2013, and April 1, 2015 officially marked the closing of the company itself after 12 years and 4 months following its inability to make a profit and was later dissolved and had its assets redistributed after filing articles of dissolution due to financial difficulties whilst expressing the hope that the website might reorganize, retain Jakarta, Indonesia as headquarters, and reopen as a social networking service in the future, but although plans to revive the website as a social networking services have been proposed. When business stabilized, the management began to re-open the site and to recovering hosted blogs, videos, photos and messaging.

== History ==
Multiply Inc. was founded in 2004 by Peter Pezaris, Michael Gersh, and David Hersh. With headquarters in Boca Raton, Florida, United States, Multiply is the second largest social network in Southeast Asia, with millions of users in the US, Brazil, India and more. Multiply initially carried out the main function as a social network where users shared photos, blogs, videos, and others. In its development, Multiply changed its function to become an electronic trading site. On September 20, 2010, most of Multiply.com's shares were acquired by Naspers Limited (NPSN-JSE), an electronic trading expert company in Europe, Asia, Latin America and Africa, in which also owns a stake in Multiply's sister company, Tencent, OLX and Mail.ru Group.

In September 2005, Multiply gathered one million users worldwide.

In June 2007, Multiply staff through its blog stated that the number of users reached five million users.

In October 2008, Multiply was used by ten million members worldwide.

Multiply has announced that it will end all its social networking and content sharing services, such as blogging, photo and video sharing, and social messaging, from 1 December 2012. The move is part of the company's strategy to focus on e-commerce in Southeast Asia, especially for Indonesia and the Philippines, the company said. The move came after the firm decided that the social networking services were better suited for rival social networks.

The company announced in December 2012 that it was considering a revamped E-commerce system for the year 2013. One of its plans was to enhance payment solutions, logistics, and the customer shopping experience in Indonesia and the Philippines.

== Blogging Paired with Media Sharing and Storage ==
Multiply Logo (2003-2013)

Multiply screenshot as of August 23, 2008

Multiply tried to be the one-stop shop for a user's Web 2.0 experience. Its bid is enhanced by the capabilities with which it empowers its users. There was a blog module, of course, but beyond that, users could upload videos, and host them on their pages rather than on third-party pages. Videos could also be added from major sites, notably YouTube. The user could also upload unlimited photos into their albums, hosted in the photo module. There were also modules for music, reviews, links, recipes, and a personal marketplace.

A blog traditionally follows a linear format (each entry rests above the other in chronological order regardless of the type of content that is included in the post). Though it is possible to have a traditional style blog on Multiply, content could also be organized according to the type of post (text, video, photo, etc.) or by topic (using tagged content boxes). By organizing posts based on topic or type of media, a user can essentially create a personal web page.

Multiply provided blog cross-posting; blog entries posted to Multiply could be automatically posted to a LiveJournal, Blogger or TypePad account. There was also an option to post via e-mail or MMS, enabling posting from mobile phones. Users could also post reviews (of movies and books, for example), and share a calendar of events. Multiply also reintroduced the Marketplace and Recipes modules, which allowed users to share interests in purchases, and favourite foods and drinks.

Multiply was especially flexible in that users could choose to edit their background and theme colours, but the ability to incorporate CSS makes customizing more extensive. Many users had pages far different from the base theme due to their mastery of CSS.

=== Traditional Blogging ===
Blog posts on Multiply included the ability to easily change font style, type, colour or size. Photos could be added and moved about within the post. A poll could be included and files could be attached. Users could use Multiply's WYSIWYG blog editor or edit HTML directly.

As with all types of posts on Multiply, users could set privacy settings on a per-post basis, enabling a user to essentially run a private blog for friends and family right on top of, or embedded within a public blog. (In other words, a user can post thoughts on politics to a public audience while reserving posts on the cute things the kids did for only friends and family. Both types of posts were treated the same by Multiply in terms of alerts to the poster and the poster's contacts, but the privacy settings limit the content to only those that the user wants to give access to.)

=== Unlimited Photo Sharing ===
All accounts on Multiply included the ability to add an unlimited number of photos. In addition to being able to share photos with contacts on Multiply, users could also let non-Multiply members see even their private photos by using the "share" link.

Multiply offered limited editing capabilities for photos: Photos could be rotated and a variety of picture frames can be added. Using the Multiply Media Locker users could crop photos, eliminate red eye, retouch photos, and adjust contrast, exposure, and saturation. There was also an Auto Fix function that adjusted photos with one click. All of the adjustments were reversible until clicked to apply them.

Photos in albums could be embedded into other posts or replies on Multiply, or they could be hotlinked outside of Multiply, in which case a watermark is added.

Multiply had partnered with QOOP for photo printing and other photo services.

Multiply had an Auto Uploading tool which automatically uploads your photos into your Media Locker where they are stored until you choose to share them. For premium users, the full-size original was stored indefinitely.

=== Videos ===
Users could easily upload videos directly to Multiply, or they could pull videos from YouTube, Photobucket, Google Video, Metacafe, or myspacetv.com. Free users could upload up to 10 minutes (or 100mb of video footage). Premium members had a limit of 20 minutes (or 200mb).

=== Calendar ===
Users could post calendar entries for themselves, for their contacts, their network or even for public access (enabling users to keep personal entries, such as doctor appointments, private, while allowing a wider audience for such entries as a fundraising event that is open to the public).

Users had access to an aggregated calendar on their Inbox page that collects all of their calendar entries as well as those of their contacts and displays them in one calendar feed.

Calendar entries, as with all entries on Multiply, could be discussed within the calendar entry post, enabling members to not only announce an event but discuss it as well.

=== Reviews ===
Users could add reviews to their website, not only rating and explaining their view on the product but discussing it as well with friends and family. Reviews used a 5-star system so both those who post and those who reply can rate how well they liked a product.

=== Recipes ===
The recipe section was a component of Multiply at the time of its launch in 2004, but it was removed for a time. The recipe and marketplace sections were returned in 2007 due to popular demand.

=== Marketplace ===
The marketplace section was designed to be a way to showcase items that a person may want to pass on to contacts or to search for an item that a user's contacts may have.

=== Music ===
Since its inception the website had allowed users to upload music playlists to their profile page. Initially, users could upload up to 10 songs at a time with an unlimited number of songs allowed on any given playlist (they could upload more songs after the first ten by starting a second upload and specifying that they should be added to a pre-existing playlist.) This brought the site's initial popularity due to the ease with which people could share copyrighted digital music. Originally one could download each track individually in mp3 format.

To combat illegal music sharing (as the intent was for users to be able to share only music that they had the legal right to), the site cut the maximum uploads at one time to five, and then to three. They then removed the ability to easily right-click and download each track and instead put a link to a *.m3u playlist file. However, users could simply save that file, open it with a text editor, and then cut and paste the individual file links and save the mp3 files.

In July 2008, the site removed the ability to download the *.m3u playlist file and replaced it with an embedded music player. However, users can still use third-party software to obtain the original mp3 files (which are also stored in a computer's download cache.) Nonetheless, these changes (as well as the large number of users forcibly removed from the site due to copyright violations) have affected the size of the user base.

== Inbox newsfeed ==
Multiply had a newsfeed since its inception, variously called the "Explore" page, "My Multiply" and the "Inbox". This feed aggregates not only the user's posts but those of the user's contacts, network and groups as well, using technology that Multiply has patented. The inbox alerts users not only to new posts by their contacts or within their network, but it also notifies users of new replies to posts that users have shown an interest in. If a user ignores a post, then the post is not popped to the top of the page no matter how many new replies are made. In this way, users don't need to "clean up" their inbox because uninteresting posts simply "drop off" the page.

The feed was highly customizable, allowing the user to set filters to show specific posts. Filters could be saved and users can easily switch between them. In this way, users were only alerted to posts and replies that are interesting to them, though they can switch to a "wider" view of network or group activity when that is preferred.

== Groups ==
In addition to networking with your "real life" friends and family, Multiply also provided a way to meet and socialize with other members through groups.

Registered users could create groups on Multiply. These groups exist outside of the "network" structure, enabling people with certain interests to share the aforementioned types of media with others who share their interests, but may not be closely connected to them through relationships.

Groups were categorized as Business, Computers & Internet, Cultures & Community, Entertainment & Arts, Friends & Family, Games, Government & Politics, Health & Wellness, Hobbies & Crafts, Money & Investing, Places & Travel, Recreation & Sports, Religion & Beliefs, Romance & Relationships, Schools & Education, Science & History, and Other.

=== Migration from MSN Groups ===
In February 2009, MSN Groups closed to make way for the new Windows Live Groups. Communities hosted on the old MSN Groups service can not be migrated across to the new platform. As such MSN have worked with Multiply to create a tool which allowed group owners to move their MSN Groups community over to the Multiply service.

This move by MSN and Multiply succeeded in killing off a large number of MSN Groups communities. This was because the migration process was rather complex, essentially creating a new group, and importing content from the old one.

This meant that all existing MSN users had to re-join the new group, and if the old community located on MSN Groups was not closed by the owner after the migration process, any changes made afterwards were to be lost when the service closed.

Details of the migration process could be found on the MSN Groups homepage which has subsequently been removed and now directs to a Microsoft Account login page, however, information regarding Groups' closure and migration to Multiply has been preserved on a Windows Live blog.

With the announced closure of Multiply's social networking sites, members who used the site for that purpose are looking for alternatives offering similar features. While Multiply has not announced a partnership with any other website or sites for migration as MSN did, the CEO did promise to provide "easy ways for you to either download your stuff (photos, blogs, content, etc) or migrate it to other online services" with details to be announced at a later date.

== Personal website ==
Though Multiply did provide a profile page for users, that was not the main focal point of a user's Multiply presence. Rather, each user had a home page where all of their recent content was aggregated. The content boxes on this home page could be rearranged and could be aligned into a one or two-column format (or a mixture of both). Tagged content boxes could also be added and unwanted boxes could be hidden.

Users could customize the overall look of their site using either one-click customization tools that Multiply provides or by adding customizations with CSS.

== Awards & recognitions ==
In 2008, Multiply was named Open Web Awards finalist.

== Headquarters moves to Indonesia ==
As Multiply expanded to include e-commerce, the announcement was made that the company was moving from its headquarters in Florida to Indonesia.

== Multiply announces closure of social networking site ==
An official announcement by Multiply's CEO, Stefan Magdalinski, was made on August 9, 2012, that the social networking portion of Multiply would be discontinued, including hosted blogs, videos, photos and messaging, in order to focus solely on e-commerce. Multiply International ceased its social network on March 21, 2013. The Indonesian division filed for bankruptcy at the Central Jakarta Commercial Court, as it is no longer able to operate on May 11, 2013, and was eventually liquidated, the affair generally involves the sale of all of the company’s property (such as social networking portion) and holdings, followed by the complete dissolution and closure of the site. Upon closure, Indonesian and Philippine users were directed to local e-commerce websites, Tokobagus and Sulit.com.ph respectively, both of which later was purchased and rebranded by the OLX Group the following year.

=== Legacy ===
As a social networking site, Multiply is best remembered for its social networking service and as a competition with other social networking services.

The multiply.com domain is currently owned by Multiply Media LLC, the owner of Answers.com.

== See also ==
- E-commerce
- Social network service
- List of social networking websites
- Comparison of video services
