= Jakarta City Center =

Coordinates: 6.210624°S 106.816506°E

- Interactive map of the Jakarta City Center area

General information
- Status: Completed
- Type: mixed
- Location: Jakarta, Indonesia, Jl. K.H. Mas Mansyur Kav.126
- Construction started: 2009
- Completed: 2012

Design and construction
- Architects: DP Architects Pte. Ltd. Singapore and PT Airmas Asri
- Developer: PT.Jakarta Realty
- Structural engineer: PT. Davysukamta Konsultan
- Main contractor: PT PP (Persero) Tbk

Other information
- Parking: 6000

Jakarta City Center or JaCC is a mixed-use development complex consist of five towers and shopping mall, located at Tanah Abang in Jakarta, Indonesia. Land area of the complex is about 13.5 hectares. A wholesale shopping mall known as Thamrin City is located at the lower 9 floors of the complex, which is the largest and most comprehensive wholesale center in Jakarta. There is a Amaris hotel in one of the apartments towers. The complex has a land area of about 12.5 hectares.

== See also ==
- List of tallest buildings in Jakarta
