= Indonesia national football team results (2010–2019) =

This article provides details of international football games played by the Indonesia national football team from 2010 to 2019.

== Results ==
Key
Win
Draw
Defeat

=== 2010 ===
6 January 2011 AFC Asian Cup qualification	Indonesia	1–2	Oman	Jakarta, Indonesia
18:30 UTC+7	Boaz 45'	Report	Bashir 32'; Sulaiman 52'	Stadium: Gelora Bung Karno Stadium; Attendance: 45,000; Referee: Subkhiddin Mohd Salleh (Malaysia)

3 March 2011 AFC Asian Cup qualification	Australia	1–0	Indonesia	Brisbane, Australia
19:00 UTC+10	Milligan 42'	Report		Stadium: Suncorp Stadium; Attendance: 20,422; Referee: Kenji Ogiya (Japan)

8 October Friendly	Indonesia	1–7	Uruguay	Jakarta, Indonesia
20:00 UTC+7	Boaz 17'	Report	Cavani 35', 80', 82'; Suárez 41', 53', 69' (pen.); Eguren 57'	Stadium: Gelora Bung Karno Stadium; Attendance: 25,000; Referee: Nagor Amir Noor Mohamed (Malaysia)

12 October Friendly	Indonesia	3–0	Maldives	Bandung, Indonesia
15:30 UTC+7	Okto 30'; Yongki 74'; Tony 90'	Report		Stadium: Siliwangi Stadium; Attendance: 13,000; Referee: Pandian Palaniyandi (Singapore)

21 November Friendly	Indonesia	6–0	Timor-Leste	Palembang, Indonesia
18:30 UTC+7	Ridwan 12'; Okto 26'; Gonzáles 37', 46'; Bambang 70'; Yongki 83'	Report		Stadium: Gelora Sriwijaya Stadium

24 November Friendly	Indonesia	2–0	Chinese Taipei	Palembang, Indonesia
18:30 UTC+7	Gonzáles 10'; Firman 18' (pen.)	Report		Stadium: Gelora Sriwijaya Stadium; Attendance: 5,000; Referee: Sukhbir Singh (Singapore)

1 December 2010 AFF Cup Group A	Indonesia	5–1	Malaysia	Jakarta, Indonesia
19:30 UTC+7	Asraruddin 22' (o.g.); Gonzáles 33'; Ridwan 52'; Arif 76'; Bachdim 90+4'	Report	Norshahrul 18'	Stadium: Gelora Bung Karno Stadium; Attendance: 62,000; Referee: Vo Minh Tri (Vietnam)

4 December 2010 AFF Cup Group A	Laos	0–6	Indonesia	Jakarta, Indonesia
19:30 UTC+7		Report	Firman 26' (pen.), 51'; Ridwan 33'; Bachdim 63'; Arif 77'; Okto 82'	Stadium: Gelora Bung Karno Stadium; Attendance: 70,000; Referee: Daud Abbas (Singapore)

7 December 2010 AFF Cup Group A	Indonesia	2–1	Thailand	Jakarta, Indonesia
19:30 UTC+7	Bambang 82' (pen.), 90+1' (pen.)	Report	Suree 69'	Stadium: Gelora Bung Karno Stadium; Attendance: 65,000; Referee: Ryuji Sato (Japan)

16 December 2010 AFF Cup Semi-finals 1st Leg	Philippines	0–1	Indonesia	Jakarta, Indonesia
19:00 UTC+7		Report	Gonzáles 32'	Stadium: Gelora Bung Karno Stadium; Attendance: 70,000; Referee: Masoud Moradi (Iran)

19 December 2010 AFF Cup Semi-finals 2nd Leg	Indonesia	1–0	Philippines	Jakarta, Indonesia
19:00 UTC+7	Gonzáles 43'	Report		Stadium: Gelora Bung Karno Stadium; Attendance: 88,000; Referee: Ali Abdulnabi (Bahrain)

26 December 2010 AFF Cup Finals 1st Leg	Malaysia	3–0	Indonesia	Kuala Lumpur, Malaysia
20:00 UTC+8	Safee 61', 72'; Ashaari 68'	Report		Stadium: Bukit Jalil National Stadium; Attendance: 98,543; Referee: Masaaki Toma (Japan)

29 December 2010 AFF Cup Finals 2nd Leg	Indonesia	2–1	Malaysia	Jakarta, Indonesia
19:00 UTC+7	Nasuha 72'; Ridwan 87'	Report	Safee 54'	Stadium: Gelora Bung Karno Stadium; Attendance: 88,000; Referee: Peter Green (Australia)

=== 2011 ===
23 July 2014 FIFA World Cup qualification	Turkmenistan	1–1	Indonesia	Ashgabat, Turkmenistan
18:30 UTC+3	Krendelew 12'	report	Ilham 30'	Stadium: Ashgabat Olympic Stadium; Attendance: 7,500; Referee: Mohsen Torky (Iran)

28 July 2014 FIFA World Cup qualification	Indonesia	4–3	Turkmenistan	Jakarta, Indonesia
19:00 UTC+7	Gonzáles 9', 19'; Nasuha 43'; Ridwan 76'	Report	Amanow 72'; Şamyradow 83'; Çoňkaýew 86'	Stadium: Gelora Bung Karno Stadium; Attendance: 88,000; Referee: Ben Williams (Australia)

22 August Friendly	Indonesia	4–1	Palestine	Surakarta, Indonesia
20:30 UTC+7	Hariono 65'; Gonzáles 70'; Bambang 77', 85'	Report	Obeid 48'	Stadium: Manahan Stadium; Attendance: 25,000; Referee: Pechsri Mongkolchai (Thailand)

27 August Friendly	Jordan	1–0	Indonesia	Amman, Jordan
22:30 UTC+4	Deeb 49'	Report		Stadium: Amman International Stadium

2 September 2014 FIFA World Cup qualification	Iran	3–0	Indonesia	Tehran, Iran
20:00 UTC+4:30	Nekounam 53', 74'; Teymourian 87'	Report		Stadium: Azadi Stadium; Attendance: 75,800; Referee: Masaaki Toma (Japan)

6 September 2014 FIFA World Cup qualification	Indonesia	0–2	Bahrain	Jakarta, Indonesia
19:00 UTC+7		Report	Saeed 45+1'; Abdul-Latif 70'	Stadium: Gelora Bung Karno Stadium; Attendance: 85,000; Referee: Lee Min-Hu (Korea Republic)

7 October Friendly	Indonesia	0–0	Saudi Arabia	Selangor, Malaysia
18:30 UTC+8		Report		Stadium: Shah Alam Stadium; Attendance: 150; Referee: Mohd Nafeez Abdul Wahab (Malaysia)

11 October 2014 FIFA World Cup qualification	Indonesia	2–3	Qatar	Jakarta, Indonesia
19:00 UTC+7	Gonzáles 27', 35'	Report	Al Sulaiti 14'; Khalfan 32'; Razak 59'	Stadium: Gelora Bung Karno Stadium; Attendance: 28,000; Referee: Malik Abdul Bashir (Singapore)

11 November 2014 FIFA World Cup qualification	Qatar	4–0	Indonesia	Doha, Qatar
19:00 UTC+3	Razak 30'; Khalfan 34' (pen.), 63'; Soria 90+2'	Report		Stadium: Jassim Bin Hamad Stadium; Attendance: 6,500; Referee: Muhsen Basma (Syria)

15 November 2014 FIFA World Cup qualification	Indonesia	1–4	Iran	Jakarta, Indonesia
19:00 UTC+7	Bambang 44'	Report	Meydavoudi 7'; Jabbari 21'; Rezaei 25'; Nekounam 73' (pen.)	Stadium: Gelora Bung Karno Stadium; Attendance: 6,000; Referee: Tan Hai (China PR)

=== 2012 ===
29 February 2014 FIFA World Cup qualification	Bahrain	10–0	Indonesia	Riffa, Bahrain
16:30 UTC+3	Abdul-Latif 5' (pen.), 71', 75'; Al Alawi 16', 61'; Abdulrahman 35' (pen.), 42'; Dhiya 63', 82', 90+4'	Report		Stadium: Bahrain National Stadium; Attendance: 3,000; Referee: Andre El Haddad (Lebanon)

5 June Friendly	Philippines	2–2	Indonesia	Manila, Philippines
19:30 UTC+8	J. Younghusband 59'; P. Younghusband 84'	Report	Wanggai 58'; Bachdim 61'	Stadium: Rizal Memorial Stadium; Referee: Kuo Jung Fan (Chinese Taipei)

10 September 2012 SCTV Cup	Indonesia	0–2	North Korea	Surabaya, Indonesia
19:00 UTC+7		Report	Park Song Chol 66'; Jong Il-Gwan 75'	Stadium: Gelora Bung Tomo Stadium; Referee: Shuhaizi bin Shukri (Malaysia)

15 September Friendly	Indonesia	0–0	Vietnam	Surabaya, Indonesia
15:30 UTC+7		Report		Stadium: Gelora Bung Tomo Stadium; Attendance: 8,000

26 September Friendly	Brunei	0–5	Indonesia	Bandar Seri Begawan, Brunei
20:15 UTC+8		Report	Bachdim 23' (pen.), 49', 72'; Bayauw 63'; Mofu 45'	Stadium: Sultan Hassanal Bolkiah Stadium

16 October Friendly	Vietnam	0–0	Indonesia	Hanoi, Vietnam
15:30 UTC+7		Report		Stadium: Mỹ Đình National Stadium

25 November 2012 AFF Cup Group B	Indonesia	2–2	Laos	Kuala Lumpur, Malaysia
17:00 UTC+8	Maitimo 43'; Mofu 90'	Report	Sayavutthi 30' (pen.); Liththideth 80'	Stadium: Bukit Jalil National Stadium; Referee: Ng Kai Lam (Hong Kong)

28 November 2012 AFF Cup Group B	Indonesia	1–0	Singapore	Kuala Lumpur, Malaysia
18:00 UTC+8	Andik 88'	Report		Stadium: Bukit Jalil National Stadium; Referee: Ali Abdulnabi (Bahrain)

1 December 2012 AFF Cup Group B	Malaysia	2–0	Indonesia	Kuala Lumpur, Malaysia
20:45 UTC+8	Azamuddin 27'; Mahali 29'	Report		Stadium: Bukit Jalil National Stadium; Referee: Valentin Kovalenko (Uzbekistan)

=== 2013 ===
31 January Friendly	Jordan	5–0	Indonesia	Amman, Jordan
21:00 UTC+3	Za'tara 30'; Bani Attiah 41', 90+2'; Amer Deeb 57' (pen.); Saeed Murjan 60'	Report		Stadium: Amman International Stadium; Referee: Abdulrahman Al-Jassim (Qatar)

6 February 2015 AFC Asian Cup qualification	Iraq	1–0	Indonesia	Dubai, United Arab Emirates
17:30 UTC+4	Mahmoud 66'	Report		Stadium: Al-Rashid Stadium; Attendance: 3,600; Referee: Minoru Tōjō (Japan)

23 March 2015 AFC Asian Cup qualification	Indonesia	1–2	Saudi Arabia	Jakarta, Indonesia
19:00 UTC+7	Boaz 5'	Report	Al-Salem 14', 55'	Stadium: Gelora Bung Karno Stadium; Attendance: 75,000; Referee: Kim Jong-Hyeok (South Korea)

7 June Friendly	Indonesia	0–3	Netherlands	Jakarta, Indonesia
20:30 UTC+7		Report	Siem 57', 67'; Robben 90'	Stadium: Gelora Bung Karno Stadium; Attendance: 80,000; Referee: Nagor Amir Noor Mohamed (Malaysia)

14 August Friendly	Indonesia	2–0	Philippines	Surakarta, Indonesia
20:45 UTC+7	Nwokolo 31'; M. Roby 65'	Report		Stadium: Manahan Stadium; Attendance: 25,000; Referee: Win Cho (Myanmar)

15 October 2015 AFC Asian Cup qualification	Indonesia	1–1	China	Jakarta, Indonesia
19:00 UTC+7	Boaz 67'	Report	Wu Xi 36'	Stadium: Gelora Bung Karno Stadium; Attendance: 500; Referee: Abdul Malik Abdul Bashir (Singapore)

1 November Friendly	Indonesia	4–0	Kyrgyzstan	Jakarta, Indonesia
19:30 UTC+7	Zulham 27', 38'; Bonai 64'; Jufriyanto 70'	Report		Stadium: Gelora Bung Karno Stadium; Attendance: 1,527; Referee: Mohd Nafeez Abdul Wahab (Malaysia)

15 November 2015 AFC Asian Cup qualification	China	1–0	Indonesia	Xi'an, China
19:35 UTC+8	Wu Lei 45+1'	Report		Stadium: Shaanxi Province Stadium; Attendance: 33,217; Referee: Peter Green (Australia)

19 November 2015 AFC Asian Cup qualification	Indonesia	0–2	Iraq	Jakarta, Indonesia
19:00 UTC+7		Report	Ahmad 27'; Jassim 32' (pen.)	Stadium: Gelora Bung Karno Stadium; Attendance: 300; Referee: Ravshan Irmatov (Uzbekistan)

=== 2014 ===
5 March 2015 AFC Asian Cup qualification	Saudi Arabia	1–0	Indonesia	Dammam, Saudi Arabia
20:30 UTC+3	Al-Muwallad 87'	Report		Stadium: Prince Mohamed bin Fahd Stadium; Attendance: 9,500; Referee: Ammar Al-Jeneibi (United Arab Emirates)

26 March Friendly	Andorra	0–1	Indonesia	Alzira, Spain
15:00 UTC+1		Report	Maitimo 49' (pen.)	Stadium: Estadio Luis Suñer Picó; Referee: Fernando Teixeira (Spain)

29 March Friendly	Cuba	1–0	Indonesia	Alzira, Spain
15:00 UTC+1	M. Roby 30' (o.g.)	Report		Stadium: Estadio Luis Suñer Picó; Referee: Antonio Mateu Lahoz (Spain)

14 July Friendly	Qatar	2–2	Indonesia	Al Wakrah, Qatar
22:00 UTC+3	Muftah 40'; A.B Ilyas 54'	Report	Salampessy 1'; Bachdim 90+3'	Stadium: Saoud bin Abdulrahman Stadium; Attendance: 1,000; Referee: Jameel Juma Abdulhasain Mohamed ( Qatar)

9 September Friendly	Indonesia	0–0	Yemen	Sleman, Indonesia
17:00 UTC+7		Report		Stadium: Maguwoharjo Stadium; Referee: Handri Kristanto (Indonesia)

14 September Friendly	Indonesia	2–0	Malaysia	Sidoarjo, Indonesia
17:00 UTC+7	Ahmad 64' (o.g.); Samsul 88'	Report		Stadium: Gelora Delta Stadium; Referee: Muhammad Taqi Aljaafari Bin Jahari (Singapore)

15 November Friendly	Indonesia	0–2	Syria	Jakarta, Indonesia
20:00 UTC+7			Khribin 4', 85'	Stadium: Gelora Bung Karno Stadium; Referee: Suhaizi Shukri (Malaysia)

22 November 2014 AFF Cup Group A	Vietnam	2–2	Indonesia	Hanoi, Vietnam
19:00 UTC+7	Quế Ngọc Hải 11'; Lê Công Vinh 68'	Report	Zulham 33'; Samsul 84'	Stadium: Mỹ Đình National Stadium; Referee: Minoru Tōjō (Japan)

25 November 2014 AFF Cup Group A	Philippines	4–0	Indonesia	Hanoi, Vietnam
16:00 UTC+7	P. Younghusband 16' (pen.); Ott 52'; Steuble 68'; Gier 79'	Report		Stadium: Mỹ Đình National Stadium; Referee: Fahad Al-Marri (Qatar)

28 November 2014 AFF Cup Group A	Indonesia	5–1	Laos	Hanoi, Vietnam
19:00 UTC+7	Evan 8'; Ramdani 20', 50'; Zulham 82'; Souksavanh 89' (o.g.)	Report	Sayavutthi 28' (pen.)	Stadium: Hàng Đẫy Stadium; Referee: Ali Sabah (Iraq)

=== 2015 ===
25 March Friendly	Indonesia	0–1	Cameroon	Sidoarjo, Indonesia
17:00 UTC+7		Report	Aboubakar 36'	Stadium: Gelora Delta Stadium; Referee: Phùng Đình Dũng (Vietnam)

30 March Friendly	Indonesia	2–1	Myanmar	Sidoarjo, Indonesia
17:00 UTC+7	Maitimo 61'; Gonzáles 74'	Report	David Htan 87'	Stadium: Gelora Delta Stadium; Attendance: 14,000; Referee: Nagor Amir bin Mohamed (Malaysia)

=== 2016 ===
6 September Friendly	Indonesia	3–0	Malaysia	Surakarta, Indonesia
21:00 UTC+7	Boaz 6', 21'; Bachdim 11'	Report		Stadium: Manahan Stadium; Attendance: 25,055; Referee: Muhammad Taqi Aljaafari (Singapore)

9 October Friendly	Indonesia	2–2	Vietnam	Sleman, Indonesia
16:45 UTC+7	Zulham 26'; Bachdim 28'	Report	Lê Văn Thắng 4'; Vũ Minh Tuấn 12'	Stadium: Maguwoharjo Stadium; Attendance: 22,167; Referee: Win Khin Maung (Myanmar)

4 November Friendly	Myanmar	0–0	Indonesia	Yangon, Myanmar
17:00 UTC+6:30		Report		Stadium: Thuwunna Stadium; Attendance: 3,631; Referee: Sassadee Warintorn (Thailand)

8 November Friendly	Vietnam	3–2	Indonesia	Hanoi, Vietnam
19:00 UTC+7	Công Vinh 45'; Công Phượng 71'; Văn Toàn 83'	Report	Boaz 32'; Bachdim 52' (pen.)	Stadium: Mỹ Đình National Stadium; Referee: Feemuechang Alongkron (Thailand)

19 November 2016 AFF Cup Group A	Thailand	4–2	Indonesia	Bocaue, Philippines
16:30 UTC+8	Peerapat 4'; Teerasil 36', 79', 90+4'	Report	Boaz 53'; Lerby 56'	Stadium: Philippine Sports Stadium; Attendance: 1,153; Referee: Valentin Kovalenko (Uzbekistan)

22 November 2016 AFF Cup Group A	Indonesia	2–2	Philippines	Bocaue, Philippines
20:00 UTC+8	Fachrudin 7'; Boaz 68'	Report	Bahadoran 31'; Younghusband 82'	Stadium: Philippine Sports Stadium; Attendance: 2,068; Referee: Yu Ming-hsun (Chinese Taipei)

25 November 2016 AFF Cup Group A	Singapore	1–2	Indonesia	Manila, Philippines
20:00 UTC+8	Khairul 27'	Report	Andik 62'; Lilipaly 85'	Stadium: Rizal Memorial Stadium; Attendance: 467; Referee: Masoud Tufaylieh (Syria)

3 December 2016 AFF Cup Semi-finals 1st Leg	Indonesia	2–1	Vietnam	Cibinong, Indonesia
19:00 UTC+7	Hansamu 7'; Boaz 50' (pen.)	Report	Quyết 17' (pen.)	Stadium: Pakansari Stadium; Attendance: 30,000; Referee: Jarred Gillett (Australia)

7 December 2016 AFF Cup Semi-finals 2nd Leg	Vietnam	2–2 (a.e.t.)	Indonesia	Hanoi, Vietnam
19:00 UTC+7	Vũ Văn Thanh 83'; Vũ Minh Tuấn 90+3'	Report	Lilipaly 54'; Lestusen 97' (pen.)	Stadium: Mỹ Đình National Stadium; Attendance: 40,000; Referee: Fu Ming (China)

14 December 2016 AFF Cup Finals 1st Leg	Indonesia	2–1	Thailand	Cibinong, Indonesia
19:00 UTC+7	Rizky 65'; Hansamu 70'	Report	Teerasil 33'	Stadium: Pakansari Stadium; Attendance: 30,000; Referee: Jumpei Iida (Japan)

17 December 2016 AFF Cup Finals 2nd Leg	Thailand	2–0	Indonesia	Bangkok, Thailand
19:00 UTC+7	Siroch 38', 47'	Report		Stadium: Rajamangala Stadium; Attendance: 48,000; Referee: Abdulla Hassan (United Arab Emirates)

=== 2017 ===
21 March Friendly	Indonesia	1–3	Myanmar	Cibinong, Indonesia
16:00 UTC+7	Hardianto 22'	Report	Maung 39'; Kyaw 74' (pen.); Sithu 90+1'	Stadium: Pakansari Stadium; Attendance: 13,150; Referee: Clifford Daypuyat (Philippines)

8 June Friendly	Cambodia	0–2	Indonesia	Phnom Penh, Cambodia
18:00 UTC+7		Report	Bachdim 26'; Zola 90+6'	Stadium: Olympic Stadium; Attendance: 70,000; Referee: Warintorn Sassadee (Thailand)

13 June Friendly	Indonesia	0–0	Puerto Rico	Sleman, Indonesia
21:45 UTC+7		Report		Stadium: Maguwoharjo Stadium; Attendance: 16,592; Referee: Sukhbir Singh (Singapore)

25 November Friendly	Indonesia	2–1	Guyana	Bekasi, Indonesia
18:30 UTC+7	Spasojević 37' (pen.), 75'	Report	Agard 9'	Stadium: Patriot Candrabhaga Stadium; Attendance: 7,491; Referee: Chaireag Ngamsom (Thailand)

2 December 2017 Aceh Tsunami Cup	Indonesia	4–0	Brunei	Banda Aceh, Indonesia
21:30 UTC+7	Hansamu 18'; Septian 25'; Fachrudin 69'; Yabes 89'	Report		Stadium: Harapan Bangsa Stadium; Referee: Oki Dwi Putra (Indonesia)

4 December 2017 Aceh Tsunami Cup	Mongolia	2–3	Indonesia	Banda Aceh, Indonesia
21:30 UTC+7	Tögöldör 38' (pen.), 58' (pen.)	Report	Adsit 7'; Haay 25'; Spasojević 45+2' (pen.)	Stadium: Harapan Bangsa Stadium; Referee: Thoriq Alkatiri (Indonesia)

6 December 2017 Aceh Tsunami Cup	Kyrgyzstan	1–0	Indonesia	Banda Aceh, Indonesia
16:00 UTC+7	Saliev 20'			Stadium: Harapan Bangsa Stadium; Referee: Musthofa Umarella (Indonesia)

=== 2018 ===
14 January Friendly	Indonesia	1–4	Iceland	Jakarta, Indonesia
19:00 UTC+7	Armaiyn 29'	Report	Guðmundsson 45+2', 66' (pen.), 72'; Smárason 59'	Stadium: Gelora Bung Karno Stadium; Attendance: 36,220; Referee: Yusuke Araki (Japan)

11 September Friendly	Indonesia	1–0	Mauritius	Cikarang, Indonesia
16:30 UTC+7	Evan 89'	Report		Stadium: Wibawa Mukti Stadium; Attendance: 12,621; Referee: Minoru Tōjō (Japan)

10 October Friendly	Indonesia	3–0	Myanmar	Cikarang, Indonesia
18:30 UTC+7	Beto 19'; Irfan 26', 40'	Report		Stadium: Wibawa Mukti Stadium; Attendance: 4,217; Referee: Hiroyuki Kimura (Japan)

16 October Friendly	Indonesia	1–1	Hong Kong	Cikarang, Indonesia
18:30 UTC+7	Beto 39'	Report	Baise 69'	Stadium: Wibawa Mukti Stadium; Attendance: 3,729; Referee: Lim Bunthoeun (Cambodia)

9 November 2018 AFF Cup Group B	Singapore	1–0	Indonesia	Kallang, Singapore
20:00 UTC+8	Hariss 37'	Report (AFFSZ); Report (AFF)		Stadium: National Stadium; Attendance: 30,783; Referee: Nguyễn Hiền Triết (Vietnam)

13 November 2018 AFF Cup Group B	Indonesia	3–1	Timor-Leste	Jakarta, Indonesia
19:00 UTC+7	Alfath 61'; Lilipaly 69' (pen.); Beto 82'	Report (AFFSZ); Report (AFF)	Gama 48'	Stadium: Gelora Bung Karno Stadium; Attendance: 15,138; Referee: Aziz Asimov (Uzbekistan)

17 November 2018 AFF Cup Group B	Thailand	4–2	Indonesia	Bangkok, Thailand
19:00 UTC+7	Korrakot 38'; Pansa 45+2'; Adisak 65'; Pokklaw 74'	Report (AFFSZ); Report (AFF)	Zulfiandi 29'; Fachrudin 89'	Stadium: Rajamangala Stadium; Attendance: 37,570; Referee: Amirul Izwan Yaacob (Malaysia)

25 November 2018 AFF Cup Group B	Indonesia	0–0	Philippines	Jakarta, Indonesia
19:00 UTC+7		Report (AFFSZ)		Stadium: Gelora Bung Karno Stadium; Attendance: 15,436; Referee: Fu Ming (China)

=== 2019 ===
25 March Friendly	Myanmar	0–2	Indonesia	Mandalay, Myanmar
18:00 UTC+6:30		Report	Nwokolo 41'; Spasojević 85' (pen.)	Stadium: Mandalarthiri Stadium; Attendance: 32,000; Referee: Torpong Somsingha (Thailand)

11 June Friendly	Jordan	4–1	Indonesia	Amman, Jordan
16:00 UTC+3	Faisal 23'; Ersan 42'; Al-Rawashdeh 63'; Al-Dardour 79'	Report	Beto 86' (pen.)	Stadium: King Abdullah II Stadium; Attendance: 500; Referee: Maher Ali (Lebanon)

15 June Friendly	Indonesia	6–0	Vanuatu	Jakarta, Indonesia
18:30 UTC+7	Beto 2', 48', 61', 65'; Evan 19', 74'	Report		Stadium: Gelora Bung Karno Stadium; Attendance: 10,000; Referee: Yudi Nurcahya (Indonesia)

5 September 2022 FIFA World Cup qualification	Indonesia	2–3	Malaysia	Jakarta, Indonesia
19:30 UTC+7	Beto 11', 38'	Report (FIFA); Report (AFC)	Sumareh 36', 90+6'; Syafiq 65'	Stadium: Gelora Bung Karno Stadium; Attendance: 54,659; Referee: Ko Hyung-jin (South Korea)

10 September 2022 FIFA World Cup qualification	Indonesia	0–3	Thailand	Jakarta, Indonesia
19:30 UTC+7		Report (FIFA); Report (AFC)	Supachok 55', 71'; Theerathon 63' (pen.)	Stadium: Gelora Bung Karno Stadium; Attendance: 11,619; Referee: Ma Ning (China)

10 October 2022 FIFA World Cup qualification	United Arab Emirates	5–0	Indonesia	Dubai, United Arab Emirates
20:00 UTC+4	Ibrahim 40'; Mabkhout 51', 63' (pen.), 72'; Ahmed 90+3'	Report (FIFA); Report (AFC)		Stadium: Al Maktoum Stadium; Attendance: 6,678; Referee: Adham Makhadmeh (Jordan)

15 October 2022 FIFA World Cup qualification	Indonesia	1–3	Vietnam	Gianyar, Indonesia
19:30 UTC+8	Bachdim 84'	Report (FIFA); Report (AFC)	Yanto 26' (o.g.); Quế Ngọc Hải 55' (pen.); Nguyễn Tiến Linh 61'	Stadium: Kapten I Wayan Dipta Stadium (Note: The Indonesia v Vietnam match was shifted to Kapten I Wayan Dipta Stadium, Gianyar from Gelora Bung Karno Stadium, Jakarta based on an internal risk management process and analysis by the PSSI General Secretariat.); Attendance: 8,237; Referee: Turki Al-Khudhayr (Saudi Arabia)

19 November 2022 FIFA World Cup qualification	Malaysia	2–0	Indonesia	Kuala Lumpur, Malaysia
20:45 UTC+8	Safawi 30', 73'	Report (FIFA); Report (AFC)		Stadium: Bukit Jalil National Stadium; Attendance: 75,044; Referee: Alireza Faghani (Iran)

== Head-to-head record ==
Indonesia national football team head-to-head records (2010–2019)
Opponent	Pld	W	D	L	GF	GA	GD	Pts	Confederation
Andorra	1	1	0	0	1	0	+1	3	UEFA
Australia	1	0	0	1	0	1	–1	0	AFC
Bahrain	2	0	0	2	0	12	–12	0	AFC
Brunei	1	1	0	0	5	0	+5	3	AFC
Cambodia	1	1	0	0	2	0	+2	3	AFC
Cameroon	1	0	0	1	0	1	–1	0	CAF
China	2	0	1	1	1	2	–1	1	AFC
Chinese Taipei	1	1	0	0	2	0	+2	3	AFC
Cuba	1	0	0	1	0	1	–1	0	CONCACAF
Guyana	1	1	0	0	2	1	+1	3	CONCACAF
Hong Kong	1	0	1	0	1	1	0	1	AFC
Iceland	1	0	0	1	1	4	–3	0	UEFA
Iran	2	0	0	2	1	7	–6	0	AFC
Iraq	2	0	0	2	0	3	–3	0	AFC
Jordan	3	0	0	3	1	10	–9	0	AFC
Kyrgyzstan	1	1	0	0	4	0	+4	3	AFC
Laos	3	2	1	0	13	3	+10	7	AFC
Malaysia	8	4	0	4	14	12	+2	12	AFC
Maldives	1	1	0	0	3	0	+3	3	AFC
Mauritius	1	1	0	0	1	0	+1	3	CAF
Myanmar	5	3	1	1	8	4	+4	10	AFC
Netherlands	1	0	0	1	0	3	–3	0	UEFA
Oman	1	0	0	1	1	2	–1	0	AFC
Palestine	1	1	0	0	4	1	+3	3	AFC
Philippines	7	3	3	1	8	8	0	12	AFC
Puerto Rico	1	0	1	0	0	0	0	1	CONCACAF
Qatar	3	0	1	2	4	9	–5	1	AFC
Saudi Arabia	3	0	1	2	1	3	–2	1	AFC
Singapore	3	2	0	1	3	2	+1	6	AFC
Syria	1	0	0	1	0	2	–2	0	AFC
Thailand	6	2	0	4	8	15	–7	6	AFC
Timor-Leste	2	2	0	0	9	1	+8	6	AFC
Turkmenistan	2	1	1	0	5	4	+1	4	AFC
United Arab Emirates	1	0	0	1	0	5	–5	0	AFC
Uruguay	1	0	0	1	1	7	–6	0	CONMEBOL
Vanuatu	1	1	0	0	6	0	+6	3	OFC
Vietnam	8	1	5	2	11	13	–2	8	AFC
Yemen	1	0	1	0	0	0	0	1	AFC
Total	82	29	17	36	121	137	–16	104	
