= 2016 in Indonesia =

- Centuries: 20th; 21st
- Decades: 1990s; 2000s; 2010s; 2020s
- See also: History of Indonesia; Timeline of Indonesian history; List of years in Indonesia

Mohamad, Ardyan (2016-03-31). "Filipina tolak TNI ikut bebaskan WNI disandera Abu Sayyaf". merdeka.com.

2016 (MMXVI) was a leap year starting on Friday of the Gregorian calendar, the 2016th year of the Common Era (CE) and Anno Domini (AD) designations, the 16th year of the 3rd millennium and the 21st century, and the 7th year of the 2010s decade.

Several events with high level media coverage occurred during the year, including the first ISIS-related terror attack in Southeast Asia in Indonesian capital Jakarta on January. The murder of Mirna Salihin was dubbed as the nation's "trial of the century" as public viewership of the trial reached a record high. Mass protests in the middle and late on the year, which erupted after controversial remarks from incumbent Governor of Jakarta Basuki Tjahaja Purnama, were both noted by observers as a prelude of the rising religious intolerance in Indonesia.

== Incumbents ==
=== President and Vice President ===
President	Vice President
Joko Widodo	Jusuf Kalla

=== Ministers and Coordinating Ministers ===
==== Coordinating Ministers ====
Photo	Position	Name
	Coordinating Minister of Political, Legal, and Security Affairs	Wiranto
	Coordinating Minister of Economic Affairs	Darmin Nasution
	Coordinating Minister of Maritime Affairs and Investment	Luhut Binsar Pandjaitan
	Coordinating Minister of Human Development and Culture	Puan Maharani

==== Ministers ====
Photo	Position	Name
	Minister of State Secretariat	Pratikno
	Minister of Home Affairs	Tjahjo Kumolo
	Minister of Foreign Affairs	Retno Marsudi
	Minister of Defence	Ryamizard Ryacudu
	Minister of Law and Human Rights	Yasonna Laoly
	Minister of Finance	Sri Mulyani
	Minister of Energy and Mineral Resources	Ignasius Jonan
	Minister of Industry	Airlangga Hartarto
	Minister of Trade	Enggartiasto Lukita
	Minister of Agriculture	Amran Sulaiman
	Minister of Environment and Forestry	Siti Nurbaya Bakar
	Minister of Transportation	Budi Karya Sumadi
	Minister of Marine Affairs and Fisheries	Susi Pudjiastuti
	Minister of Manpower	Hanif Dhakiri
	Minister of Public Works and Public Housing	Basuki Hadimuljono
	Minister of Health	Nila Moeloek
	Minister of Education and Culture	Muhadjir Effendy
	Minister of Agrarian Affairs and Spatial Planning	Sofyan Djalil
	Minister of Social Affairs	Khofifah Indar Parawansa
	Minister of Religious Affairs	Lukman Hakim Saifuddin
	Minister of Communication and Information Technology	Rudiantara
	Minister of Research and Technology	Mohamad Nasir
	Minister of Cooperatives and Small & Medium Enterprises	Anak Agung Gede Ngurah Puspayoga
	Minister of Women's Empowerment and Child Protection	Yohana Yembise
	Minister of Administrative and Bureaucratic Reform	Asman Abnur
	Minister of Villages, Development of Disadvantaged Regions and Transmigration	Eko Putro Sandjojo
	Minister of National Development Planning	Bambang Brodjonegoro
	Minister of State-Owned Enterprises	Rini Soemarno
	Minister of Tourism and Creative Economy	Arief Yahya
	Minister of Youth and Sports	Imam Nahrawi

==== Reshuffled Ministers ====
Photo	Position	Name
	Coordinating Minister of Political, Legal, and Security Affairs	Luhut Binsar Pandjaitan
	Coordinating Minister of Maritime Affairs and Investment	Rizal Ramli
	Minister of Energy and Mineral Resources (1st)	Sudirman Said
	Minister of Energy and Mineral Resources (2nd)	Arcandra Tahar
	Minister of Finance	Bambang Brodjonegoro
	Minister of Industry	Saleh Husin
	Minister of Trade	Thomas Trikasih Lembong
	Minister of Transportation	Ignasius Jonan
	Minister of Education and Culture	Anies Baswedan
	Minister of Agrarian Affairs and Spatial Planning	Ferry Mursyidan Baldan
	Minister of Administrative and Bureaucratic Reform	Yuddy Chrisnandi
	Minister of Villages, Development of Disadvantaged Regions and Transmigration	Marwan Jafar
	Minister of National Development Planning	Sofyan Djalil

== Events ==
=== January ===
- January 1 - A low explosive device exploded under a local television TVOne van outside Bandung's mayor house. No one was injured.
- January 4 - A young doctor with her child went missing in Yogyakarta. Her disappearance went viral in social media as she left a note that she will "fight for Allah".
- January 6 - After the disappearance of Dr. Rica, another five people went missing in Yogyakarta; the youngest was a high school student.
- January 11 - Dr. Rica and five other missing people were found by the police in Pangkalan Bun, West Kalimantan. Two other people were arrested in connection with the disappearance, as police thought they were "recruiters".
- January 12 - After the discovery of Dr. Rica, reports of missing persons spiked to 15 people in Yogyakarta alone.
- January 13 - More than 33 people were reported missing in Yogyakarta after the discovery of Dr. Rica. It was suspected that they had joined an Islamist group called 'GAFATAR'.

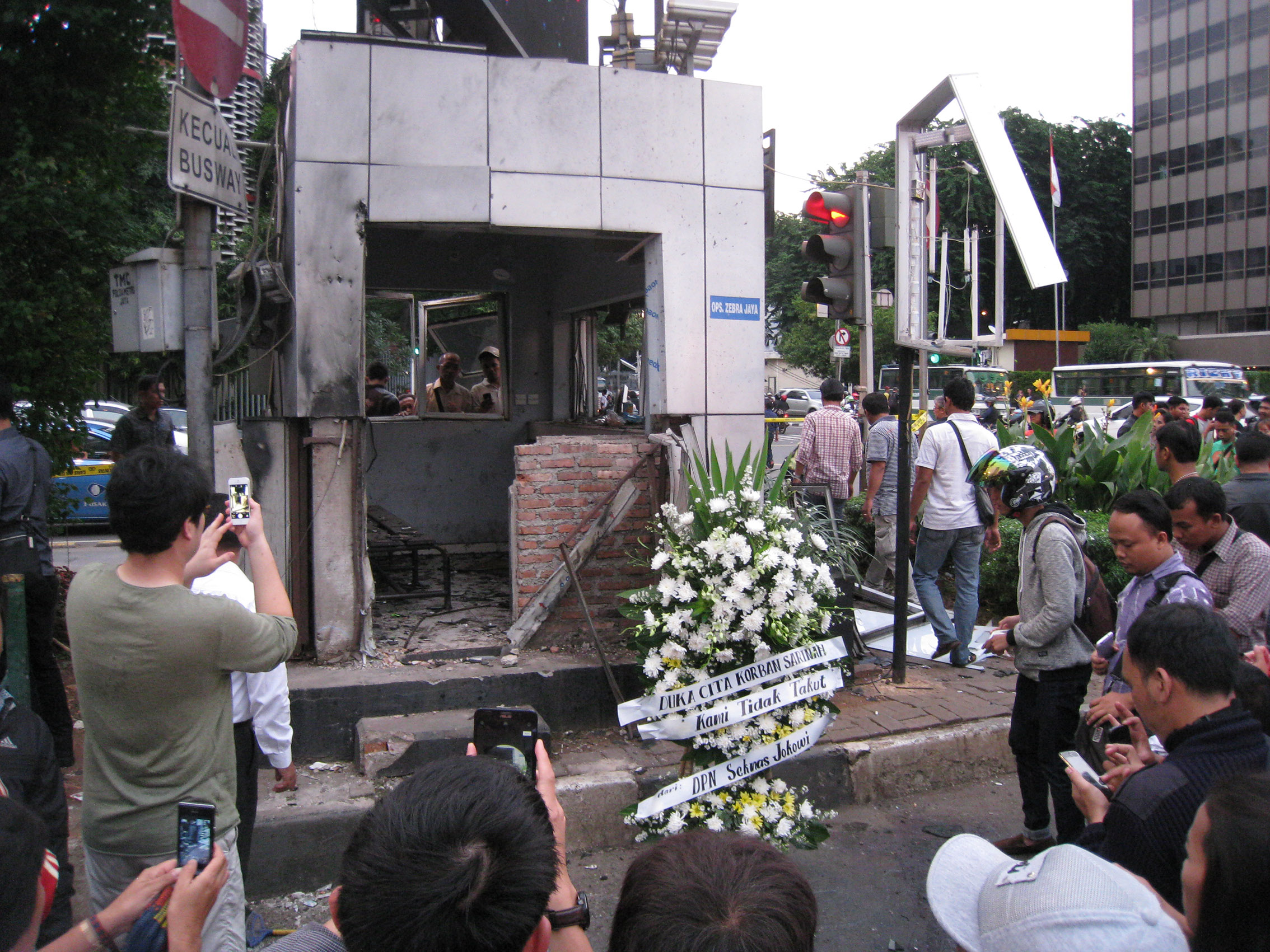
A damaged police station in Sarinah due to grenades in Jakarta attacks

Video of the 2016 Jakarta Attacks

- January 14 - 2016 Jakarta Terror Attack; a terrorist attacked a Starbucks cafe and a police box in Jakarta, killing four civilians (one fatality occurred a few days after the attack) and wounding 24. Islamic State of Iraq and Syria claimed responsibility in the first ISIS attack in Southeast Asia.
- January 15 -
  - Three people were arrested in Cirebon in connection with the Jakarta attacks.
  - Numbers of missing people, possibly joining GAFATAR, kept rising.
- January 19 - An ex-GAFATAR barrack was found by locals in Mempawah, West Kalimantan. Outraged, they burned it to the ground as the mayor watched and cried.
- January 20 - Yogyakarta Regional Police sent 100 personnel from their division to Mempawah to pick up ex-GAFATAR and 'would be' GAFATAR members.
- January 21

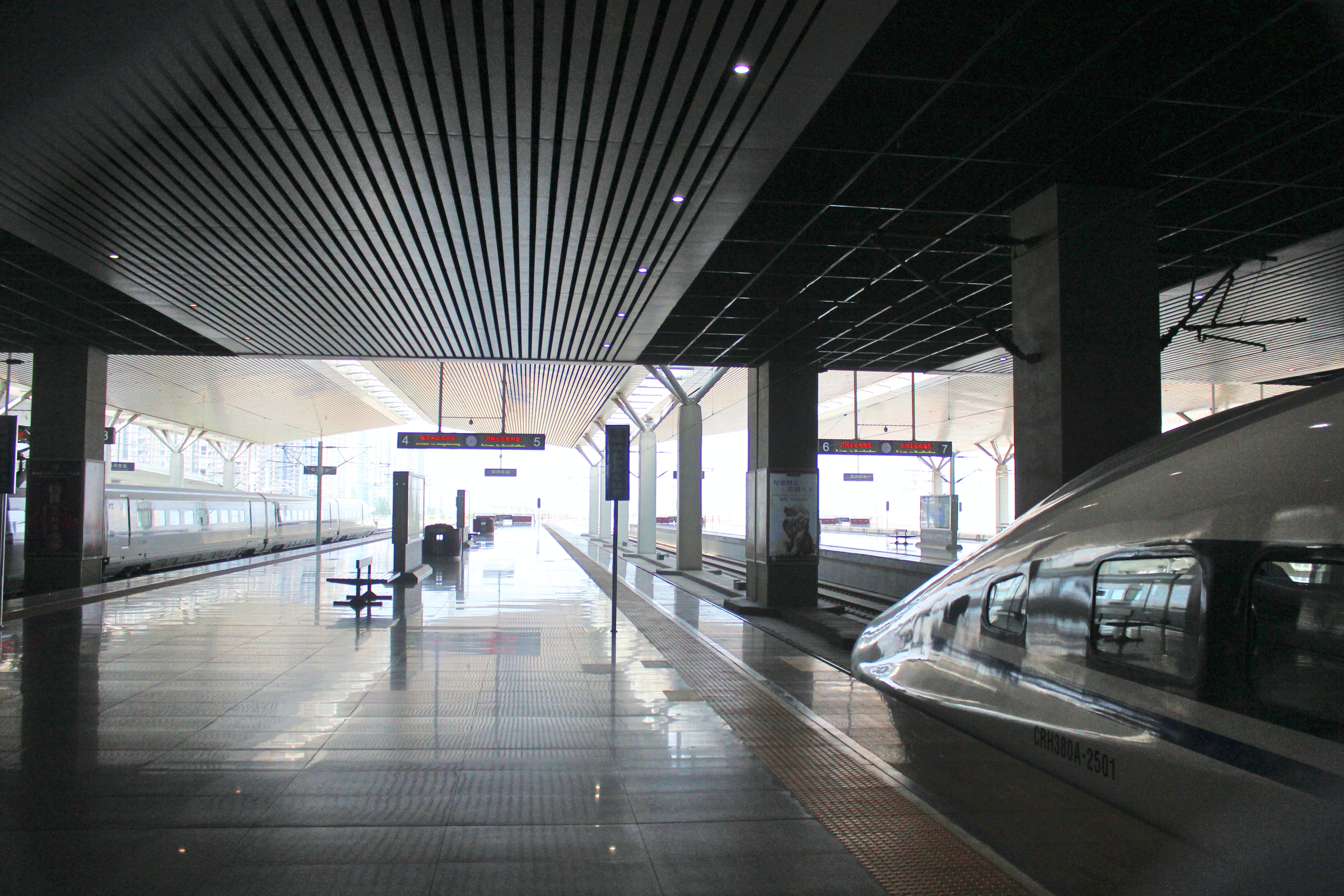
President Joko Widodo planned to create a bullet train route between Jakarta and Bandung

  - President Joko Widodo announced the construction of a bullet train with its starting route from Jakarta to Bandung, the first in Indonesia and Southeast Asia.
  - A total of 92 people went missing in Yogyakarta alone. Police stated that 300 people were missing across Indonesia to join the organization.

=== February ===
- February 6 - 19 people, mostly students from Papua, died of alcohol poisoning in Sleman, Yogyakarta after drinking bootleg liquor.
- February 7 - The death toll from bootleg liquor in Yogyakarta rose to 21 people. A few hours later, the number rose to 24.
- February 8 - The death toll from bootleg liquor in Yogyakarta reached 25 people.

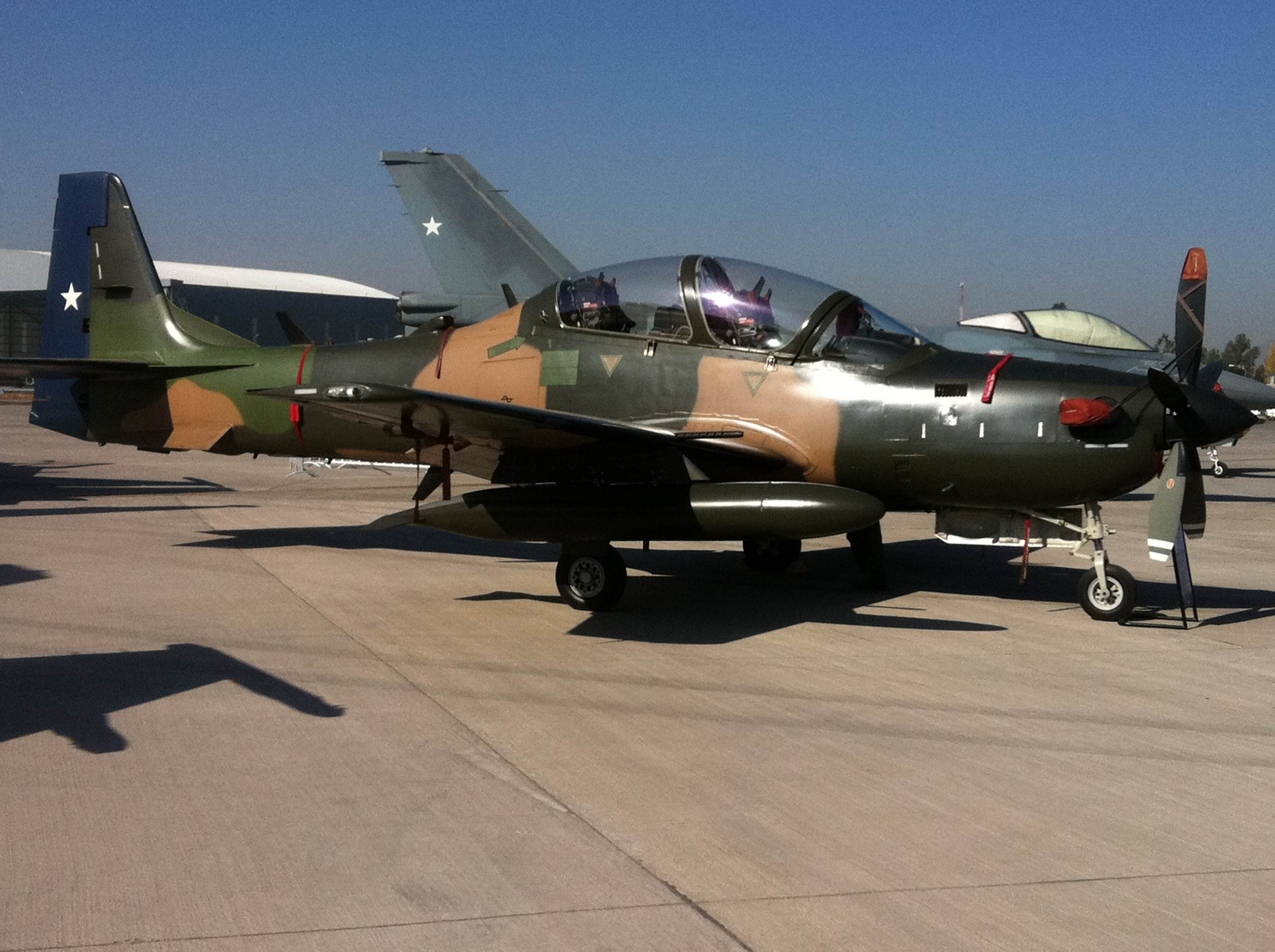
An Embraer EMB 314 Super Tucano similar to the one involved in the crash in Malang

- February 10 - A Super Tucano operated by the Indonesian Air Force crashed into a crowded neighborhood in Malang, killing a woman. One person was pronounced missing. The pilot was found in a paddy field in critical condition. It was the second Indonesian Air Force aviation accident in just two months. President Joko Widodo called for an audit program immediately.
- February 12
  - President Joko Widodo inaugurated ten elected people as governors and vice governors of Bengkulu, Jambi, Riau Islands, South Kalimantan, and West Sumatra.
  - Indonesian National Police announced that 22 people were arrested in connection with the Jakarta attacks.
- February 16 - The death toll from bootleg liquor topped 26 people. At the same time, Yogyakarta police found that a total of 37 percent of methane and some insecticides had been added to the liquor.
- February 18 - Rio Haryanto became the first Indonesian racer to join Formula One.

=== March ===
- March 3 - A shallow, magnitude 7.9 earthquake rocked Mentawai Island. A tsunami warning was issued throughout Sumatra, but later cancelled. No reports of damage and casualties.
- March 4
- Video of MV Rafelia capsizing Another angle of MV Rafelia capsizing
  - A roll on roll off vessel, MV Rafelia, carrying 76 people and 25 cars and trucks, tilted and capsized in Bali Strait while en route to Ketapang. Most passengers weren't aware that the vessel was tilting, as it kept moving forward. A total of five people were found dead. One body was found steering the wheel, later identified as a passenger, not the captain. The incident was caught on camera.
  - The largest jazz music festival in Southeast Asia, the 2016 Java Jazz Festival, began in Jakarta.
- March 6
  - The High Conferention Meeting of Organisation of Islamic Cooperation began in Jakarta, opened by President Joko Widodo. President Joko Widodo announced that Indonesia strongly supports the independence of Palestine and will open a consulate in Ramallah.
  - Seven people were killed and several others injured in Bojonegoro when an Elf carrying 15 people collided with a Honda Mobilio.
- March 8 - Three orangutans were found burned to death in Bontang, East Kalimantan. Their deaths went viral on social media and were known as the "Orangutan Tragedy".

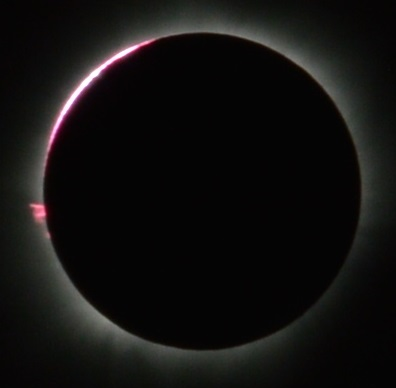
9 March 2016 total solar eclipse seen from Balikpapan

- March 9 - The 2016 total solar eclipse could be seen in every Southeast Asian countries. The totality could only be seen in West Sumatra, South Sumatra, Bengkulu, Jambi, Bangka Belitung, West Kalimantan, Central Kalimantan, South Kalimantan, East Kalimantan, West Sulawesi, Central Sulawesi and North Maluku. Festivals and celebrations were held around the country, particularly in the area the total eclipse hit.
- March 14 - The head of Ogan Ilir Regency, Noviadi Marwadi, was detained by authorities due to drug abuse. He was caught while having a drug party. He had been just sworn in by President Joko Widodo a month earlier. Two civil staff members accompanying him were also detained.
- March 16 - Four construction workers were shot dead when a gunman opened fire in Papua. One person survived the carnage by fleeing the scene, and later reported the incident to local police.
- March 17 - A laser was shot at an aircraft while taking off from Yogyakarta Adisucipto International Airport. This caused widespread concern about aviation safety in Indonesia. The chief of the Indonesian Police ordered a manhunt for the shooter.
- March 19
  - Due to massive reports of illegal fishing, the government of Indonesia finally stated that they would blow up every ship that was caught doing illegal fishing in their territory. A Chinese fishing boat named MV Fey was caught doing this and the Indonesian army tugged the boat to the "sinking" site. However, possibly outraged, the Chinese coastguard rammed into the Indonesian army boat. Furious, the Minister of Maritime and Fishery Susi Pudjiastuti asked China to explain their action that defended the illegal fisher, claiming that they support illegal fishing.
  - A total of 32 cities and municipalities in Indonesia participated in an event to switch all the lights off for a total of one hour. Lights in famous landmarks in Indonesia, including Prambanan and Borobudur, were switched off.
  - A controversial video made by Red Bull, which showed a foreign man jumping on Borobudur, was condemned by netizens in Indonesia and residents of the area. Red Bull then pulled the video from its Facebook page.
- March 20
  - An Indonesian Air Force helicopter Bell 412 crashed in Poso, Central Sulawesi, killing all 13 people on board. They were generals, lieutenant generals, Army officers, and high-profile military people. Witnesses stated that lightning had struck the helicopter, causing it to crash. President Joko Widodo sent his sincere condolences to the victims and their next of kin. He later stated that an immediate investigation was needed. Australia also sent their sincere condolences. The helicopter crashed while the army conducted a manhunt for a famous local Islamist militant Santoso. This particular group usually attack police stations and threw grenades at them. A search and rescue team found that the plane was totally destroyed by the force of impact.
  - Indonesian Foreign Minister Retno Marsudi condemned China's action to stop the sinking of their ship that was caught doing illegal fishing in Indonesian territory, MV Fey. In a press conference, she had already called the ambassador of China to Indonesia and stated three violations of China's action.
- March 22
  - As three coordinated bombs exploded in the city of Brussels, Belgium, Indonesian Foreign Minister Retno Marsudi quickly gathered whereabouts of Indonesians in Brussels. Later, it was revealed that three Indonesians were injured in the Zaventem International Airport explosion. Retno Marsudi, on behalf of the Indonesian government and people, condemned the attack.
  - A riot took place in Jakarta, where thousands of taxi drivers marched down the streets and protested other vehicle for hire companies in Indonesia. They damaged other taxis, beat a Go-Jek driver, smashed the windows of a bus, and set a tire fire. Most netizens responded to their actions negatively and created some memes to insult them.
- March 25 - Malabero Jail, located in the province of Bengkulu, caught fire. The fire, raged throughout the structure, destroying the building. A total of 257 prisoners were evacuated. As a few prisoners tried to escape, gunshots were fired in the air. Five prisoners burned to death. Witnesses reported that several explosions were heard inside the jail before the fire, indicating a possible short circuit.
- March 26 - Philippines terrorist group Abu Sayyaf hijacked two Indonesian ships carrying 7.000 tonnes of coal. A total of 10 Indonesian crews were held hostage. The perpetrators asked for a ransom worth 50 million Philippines pesos.
- March 29 - A massive blast occurred in Haluoleo University in Kendari, Southeast Sulawesi. Four people were killed and eight others were injured. The blast occurred when the university conducted a police training to "evacuate an explosive device". The device had faulty wiring, and thus exploded while police officers demonstrated how to evacuate the device.
- March 31 - The Philippines refused an Indonesian offer to help its military in rescuing the 10 Indonesians held hostage by Abu Sayyaf.

=== April ===
- April 1 - A shallow, 13 kilometers deep, magnitude 4.7 earthquake jolted the Island of Lombok, damaging a total of 44 structures including houses and community services buildings. No one was killed in the incident.
- April 4 - Batik Air Flight 7703, a Boeing 737 registered as PK-LBS, collided with a TransNusa Air Services ATR 42, registered PK-TNJ in Halim Perdanakusuma Airport in Jakarta. The Boeing 737's wingtip sliced off the ATR 42 tailfin and its winglets. The Boeing 737's wing burst into flames. No one was killed. Several people were injured.
- April 8 - A few months after being sworn in by President Joko Widodo, the Governor of Riau Islands, Muhammad Sani, took his last breath in Jakarta's Abdi Waluyo Hospital. He died at 03.00 p.m after being in intensive care in the hospital. He planned to meet Joko Widodo and Jusuf Kalla to discuss several things. President Joko Widodo and Vice President Jusuf Kalla later visited his body in Jakarta.
- April 9 - Foreign Minister Retno Marsudi met with Vice President Jusuf Kalla to discuss the fate of the 10 Indonesians held hostage by Abu Sayyaf.
- April 11 - A shallow, 16 kilometers deep, 5.9 magnitude earthquake rocked the province of Bengkulu, damaging a total of 27 houses and even Bengkulu's Meteorological Office. No one was killed in the earthquake.

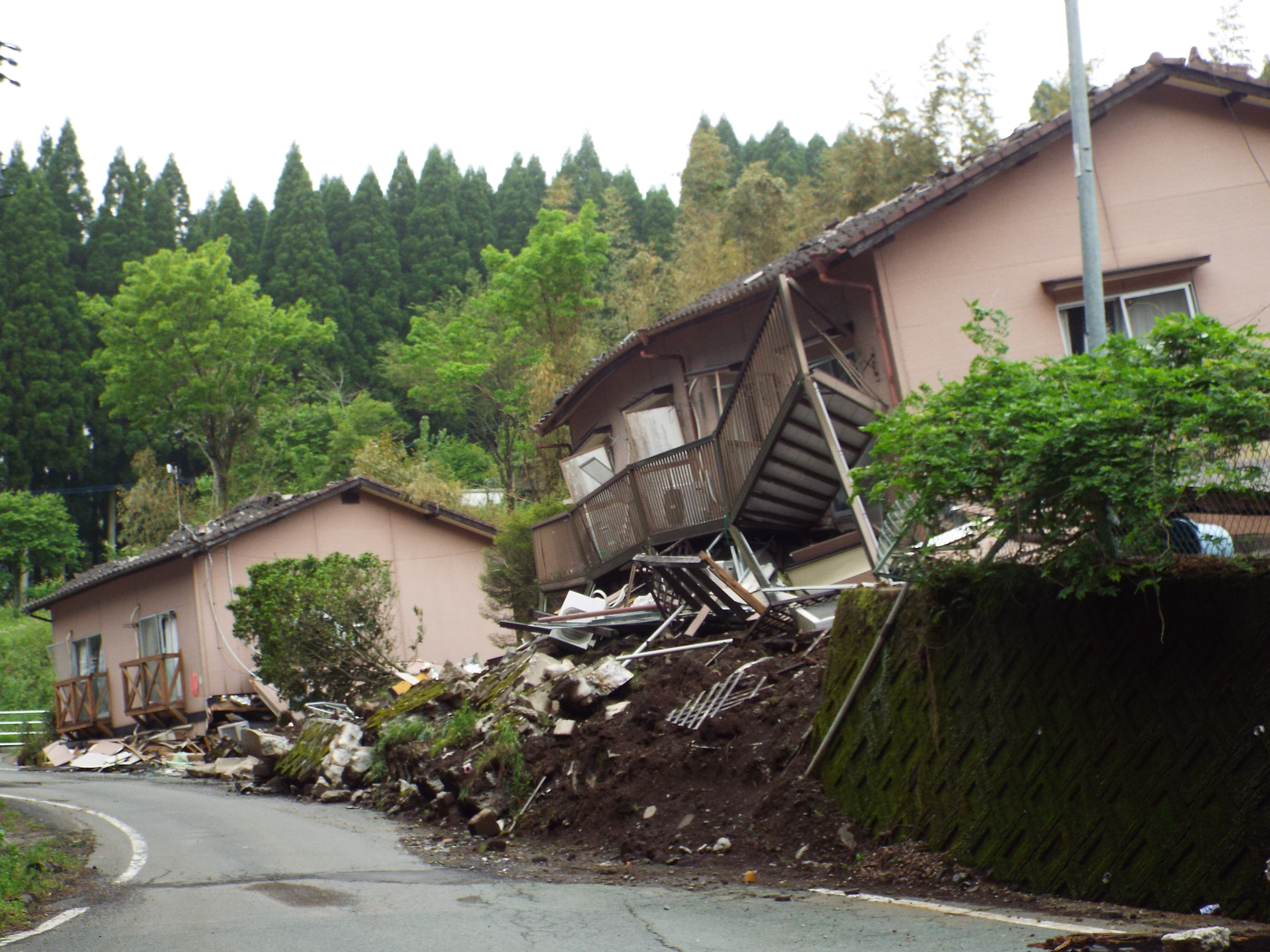
Massive earthquake in Kumamoto, Japan destroyed houses and structures

- April 15 - The Indonesian government stated that two Indonesian citizens studying in Japan were injured after a massive earthquake rocked Kumamoto, Japan. More than 300 Indonesian citizens were evacuated as the result of the quake, 19 of them to Fukuoka. The Indonesian consulate in Japan later assisted the Japanese search and rescue team to help the victims of the disaster.

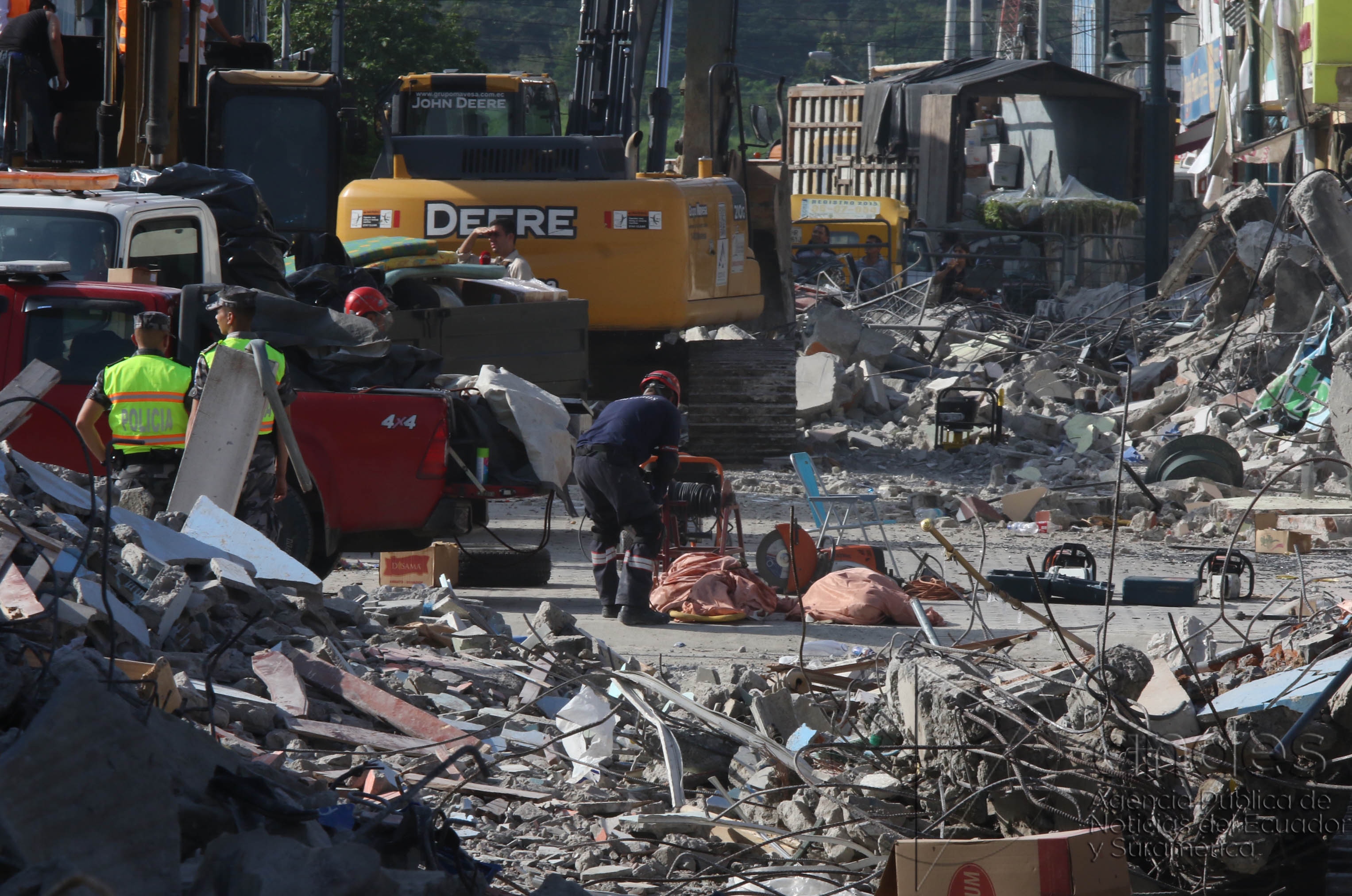
Earthquake in Ecuador kills hundreds

- April 16
  - As a massive earthquake rocked Ecuador killing hundreds and injuring thousands, Indonesian Foreign Minister Retno Marsudi urged all Indonesians to stay calm while receiving information from Ecuador about the safety of Indonesian citizens in Ecuador due to the quake. She later received a statement that no Indonesians were killed or injured in the quake.
  - A Philippine terrorist group hijacked another Indonesian ship carrying 10 Indonesian citizens while returning home to Tarakan, North Kalimantan. However, this time, the Malaysian police took action, and rescued a of six Indonesian citizens, one of whom received a gunshot wound in the leg. The remaining four Indonesians were taken hostage by the group. Indonesian President Joko Widodo urged to tighten the security in the Philippines' Southern Sea.
- April 16–20 - A total of six people were shot by a mysterious person in Chinatown in Magelang, Central Java. All of the victims were women, and they stated that most of them had just walked for about ten steps from a shop until they were attacked by the man.
- April 19 - Four Indonesians were held hostage by Philippines terrorist group Abu Sayyaf and were moved to the Island of Tawi-Tawi.
- April 22 - Samadikun Hartono, a suspect for a corruption scandal that had been searched for 11 years, was finally arrested by Indonesian police. He was caught while watching the Formula One in Shanghai.
- April 23 - A riot broke out in Banceuy Prison in Bandung, West Java. The riot started when a prisoner found his fellow prisoner hanging himself in his room. The prisoners then set fire to the guard room and overturned several cars.
- April 25 - A gashing incident occurred in the city of Yogyakarta when a man gashed three women randomly in the street with a cutter. One of them was an elementary school student. One of the victims suffered a deep wound due to the gashing. Police stated that the suspect might be related to the shooting in Magelang.
- April 26 - President Joko Widodo invited the General and the Foreign Minister of Malaysia and Philippines to talk about safety in the Philippines South Sea.
- April 27
  - Nahdlatul Ulama condemned the taking of 14 Indonesians as hostages by Abu Sayyaf.
  - The total number of victims shot by the mysterious man in Magelang rose to 13. Most of them were women. Police stated that the incident might be related to the gashing incident in Yogyakarta.
- April 29 - The suspected Magelang shooter was finally arrested by Indonesian National Police in Magelang. He was caught while in effect with drugs. They later conducted a manhunt for his brother, possibly also involved in the shooting.
- April 30 - After the arrest of the suspected Magelang shooter, another shooting occurred. This one was in Bantul when four people, using an air soft gun, shot two teenagers in a warong. The four suspects then fled the scene. Both teenagers were injured.

=== May ===
May 2016 was remembered in Indonesia as a month of rape cases, revealing a massive moral crises in Indonesia, as rapes were reported nearly every day.

- May 1 - After being held hostage by Abu Sayyaf since March 26, 10 hostages were freed and returned to Indonesia, arriving at Halim Perdanakusuma International Airport. They then attended a dinner celebration, hosted by Indonesian President Joko Widodo in his residence, before returning to their families. However, four Indonesians remained as hostages of Abu Sayyaf, held since April 16.
- May 3
  - Amokrane, a former MMA fighter from France, was shot dead by police after he stabbed an Indonesian police officer to death while police tried to interrogate him.
  - Yuyun, a 13-year-old student in Bengkulu, was brutally raped and killed by 14 minors. This sparked further intense national debate about women's safety. News of the incident was shared in social media, and vigils were held in several cities around the country.
  - Feby Kurnia, a student of Gadjah Mada University, was found dead in a locked toilet in the university, after being missing for 5 days. Her death sparked national debate concerning security within Indonesian universities.
  - Nurain Lubis, a lecturer at the Muhammadiyah University of North Sumatera, was stabbed to death on-campus by one of her own students, in revenge. This killing, together with the discovery of the body of Feby Kurnia on the same day in another university, made security in every university in Indonesia a topic of national debate.
- May 4
  - 415 people were infected during a dengue fever outbreak in Banten, and there were seven fatalities.
  - Women's rights activists and the Indonesian public demonstrated in response to the rape and murder of Yuyun on May 3, which had been neglected by the national media. The protesters demanded that the law to tighten convictions of perpetrators of sexual assault, as suggested by President Joko Widodo in 2015, be passed.
  - Amran Andi Sinta, a former national basketball athlete, died.
  - Tuty Awaliyah, a former Minister of Women's Affairs, died.
- May 5
  - Etihad Airways Flight 474, an Etihad Airways Airbus A330-200 bound for Jakarta from Abu Dhabi, entered severe turbulence while flying over Medan and Palembang airspace. The A330 landed safely, but 33 people were injured, 9 of whom were seriously injured.
  - Indonesia became the host country of the 2017 World Press Freedom Day.
- May 6
  - MV Vega, a passenger boat carrying 54 persons heading to a wedding reception, sank in Muara Selangot, Paser, East Kalimantan. A search and rescue team eventually found only 47 survivors, while the remainder drowned. Investigators stated that the boat should have only had 28 occupants, suggesting that it may have been overloaded.
  - In response to recent hijackings and kidnappings by the Philippines' terrorist group Abu Sayyaf, Indonesia, Malaysia and the Philippines agreed to tighten sea patrols in the Sulu Sea.
- May 7
  - Nusantara Qur'an Reading was held throughout the nation.
  - Hong Kong Airlines Flight 6704, an Airbus A330-200 operated by Hong Kong Airlines, was hit by severe turbulence and made an emergency landing at Ngurah Rai International Airport in Denpasar, Bali. 17 people were injured, three of whom were seriously injured.
- May 8
  - Only five days after the rape of Yuyun, a 13-year-old girl in Manado, North Sulawesi was raped by 19 men, two of whom were local police officers.
  - A tour bus overturned in Kudus Regency, Central Java. Five people were killed.
- May 10 - Indonesian Police officially stated that 15 drug dealers would be executed in Nusakambangan Island during the year.
- May 11
  - After nearly a month in captivity, the last four Indonesians held hostage by Abu Sayyaf were finally freed and returned home to Indonesia. Indonesian President Joko Widodo thanked the Philippines Government and the Malaysian Government for their cooperation.
  - A two-and-a-half-year-old girl was raped and killed by her own neighbour in Bogor, West Java. The suspect hid her body inside a closet that was disposed behind the house as the whole village went searching for her.
- May 12 - A 12-year-old girl was raped by four men in Jakarta, while in Surabaya a girl was sexually abused by eight children, one of them an elementary school student.
- May 14 - An 11-year-old elementary school student was raped by four teenagers, in Klaten, Central Java. Due to the number of rape cases in recent weeks, there was public outcry about the lack of women's safety throughout Indonesia, with demands for immediate action by the Indonesian Government.
- May 15 - Eno Fariha, a factory worker in Tangerang, was found dead after being raped and murdered by her boyfriend and two accomplices after refusing to have sexual intercourse with him. Her death generated further intense national debate about women's safety, as her killing was one of the most sadistic murder cases in Indonesia. The murder weapon was the handle of a hoe, which had been forced so deeply into her vagina that it penetrated her lungs.
- May 16 - A total of 21 tourists were killed in Sibolangit, North Sumatra by a flash flood. 200 personnel were deployed by the Search and Rescue Agency.
- May 17 - The alarming total of 58 children, ranging from elementary school to junior high school students, were reported to have been victims of rape in Kediri, East Java. The perpetrator was a well-known local businessman, Sony Sandra, a former national footballer. The many rapes were condemned by the government and Indonesian Police, who describing it as ‘a crime against humanity’.
- May 19 – A large explosion occurred in the basement of Gandaria City Mall in Jakarta due to a suspected gas leak. 13 people were injured in the incident.
- May 21 – Mount Sinabung erupted for the first time since 2013. A pyroclastic flow descended the side of the volcano and engulfed a nearby village. A total of nine people were burned to death. Mass evacuations were ordered immediately after the incident.

=== June ===
- June 2
  - A deep, strong magnitude 6.5 earthquake rocked West Sumatra. More than 2000 structures were damaged in the quake. The shaking was felt as far away as Johor, Malaysia. At least seven Singaporeans reported that they felt moderate shaking in their apartments in Singapore. No one was killed in the quake, but 30 people were injured.
  - An empty, half-built 17-story building collapsed in Bintaro, Jakarta. Shaking due to the collapse could be felt for kilometers in Jakarta. No one was killed or injured in the incident.
- June 4 – A helicopter belonging to PT Amor exploded and crashed in Paniai, Papua Province. One person was killed, and three passengers were critically injured.
- June 9–12 - Indonesia storm surge: 24 regions in Southern Java were affected by destructive storm surge. Storm surge destroys most villages and cities infrastructures, and paralyzes locst Asia, was al economies. In Aceh several villages were submerged due to the storm surge.
- June 10 - July 17 - Jakarta Fair Kemayoran, the largest fair in Southeast Asia, is officially opened.

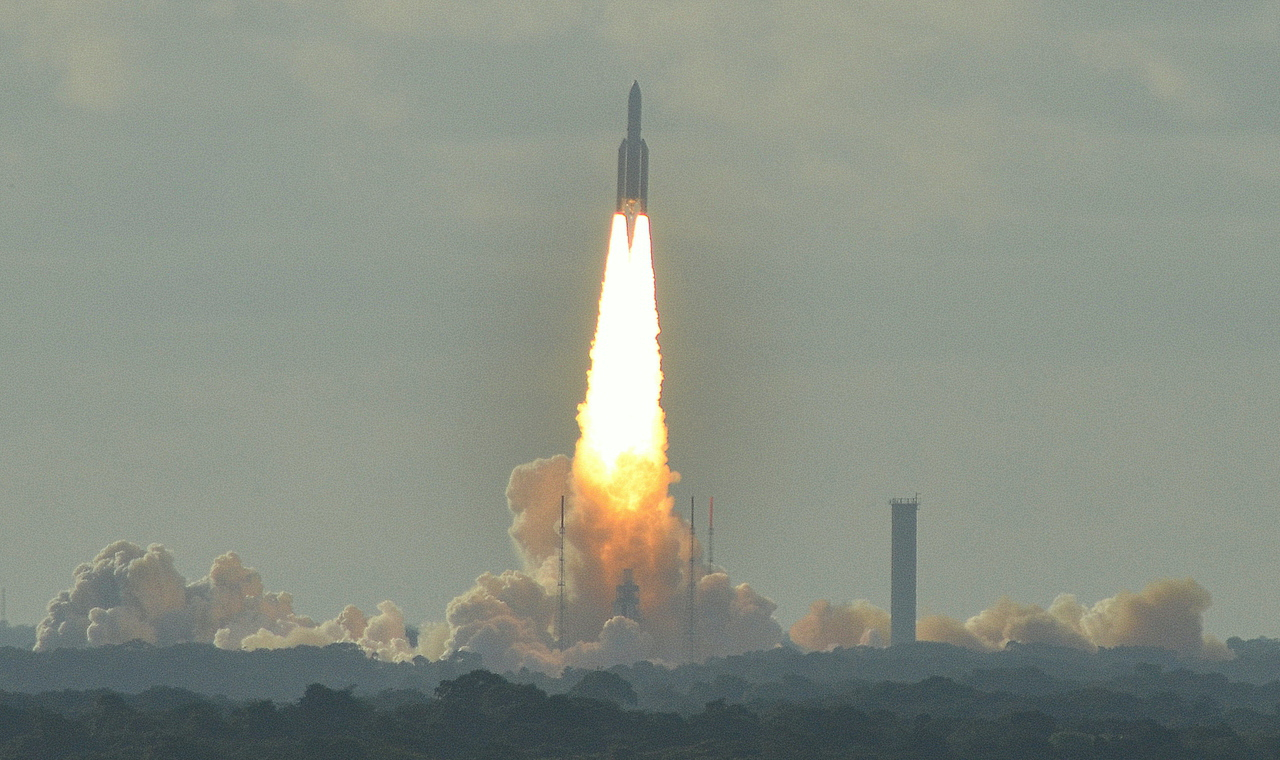
BRIsat, the first bank-operated satellite in the world, lifts off

- June 16 - BRIsat Launch: BRIsat, the first bank-operated satellite in the world, owned by Indonesian national bank BRI, lift off from Kourou, French Guiana.
- June 17 - Having a mechanical failure in mid-ocean, a Sri Lankan migrant boat landed in Lhoknga, Aceh to seek help. They asked if the Indonesian Government could request help from the UNHCR, so the migrants could continue their journey to Christmas Island, Australia.
- June 18 – 32 whales were found stranded on the coast of Probolinggo, East Java. Eight died; the rest were released back to the sea after being rescued by locals.
- June 19 - Purworejo Landslide: On 18:30 local time, a massive landslide engulfed several villages in Purworejo, Central Java. At least 15 people were listed as missing and 47 were killed. Search and Rescue Agency set up a crisis center and evacuation center in nearby area, and deployed more than 450 personnel to ground zero. President Joko Widodo sent his sincere condolences to the victims of the disaster, as well as the victims in the wake of a string of natural disasters in Central Java.

Moment of the Sangihe Disaster

- June 21 - Sangihe Disaster: A tsunami-like mudslide slammed the Municipality of Sangihe Islands in North Sulawesi. Five people were killed, two were missing and 209 houses were damaged in the disaster. More than 5000 people sought refuge in an evacuation centre. Authorities stated that the damage was estimated at 56 billion rupiah.
- June 22 - Philippine's terrorist group Abu Sayyaf were suspected to have taken hostage of seven Indonesians in the sea near East Kalimantan. The East Kalimantan Police had been notified by local authorities. Suspicion of the third hostage-taking situation in 2016 arose when one of the hostages called his wife that his ship has been hijacked and the crews were taken hostage by Abu Sayyaf.

=== July ===
- July 3–5 - Horror in Brexit (Brebes Exit): Twelve people died due to a three-day gridlock in Brebes exit toll. Some of them were killed due to CO_{2} poisoning.
- July 5 - A suicide bomber identified as Nur Rohman, 30, attacked a police headquarters in Surakarta, Indonesia after being denied entry to the building. The blast, which was described as a "low explosive blast", injured an officer's face. Nur Rohman, the perpetrator, was the only casualty. Nur Rohman initially tried to detonate his explosives while the police conducting a morning ceremony. The attack occurred just one day before Indonesia celebrates Eid-Al-Fitr. President Joko Widodo cut short his visit in Padang, and ordered police to tighten security in Indonesia. Minister of Tourism stated that Indonesians should not be scared due to the incident. Police later announced that Nur Rohman was linked with the Jakarta attacks earlier in January, and stated that this incident might be ISIL inspired.
- July 8 - An Indonesian Air Force Bell 205 A-1 registered as HA-5073 crashed into two houses in Tamanmartani Village, Kalasan, Sleman. 3 people were killed and 3 people were wounded. Investigators suspected that an engine failure occurred mid-flight.
- July 11 - Indonesian government confirmed that 3 Indonesians were abducted and taken hostage by Philippines' terrorist group Abu Sayyaf, making the total number of Indonesians taken hostage by Abu Sayyaf to 10.

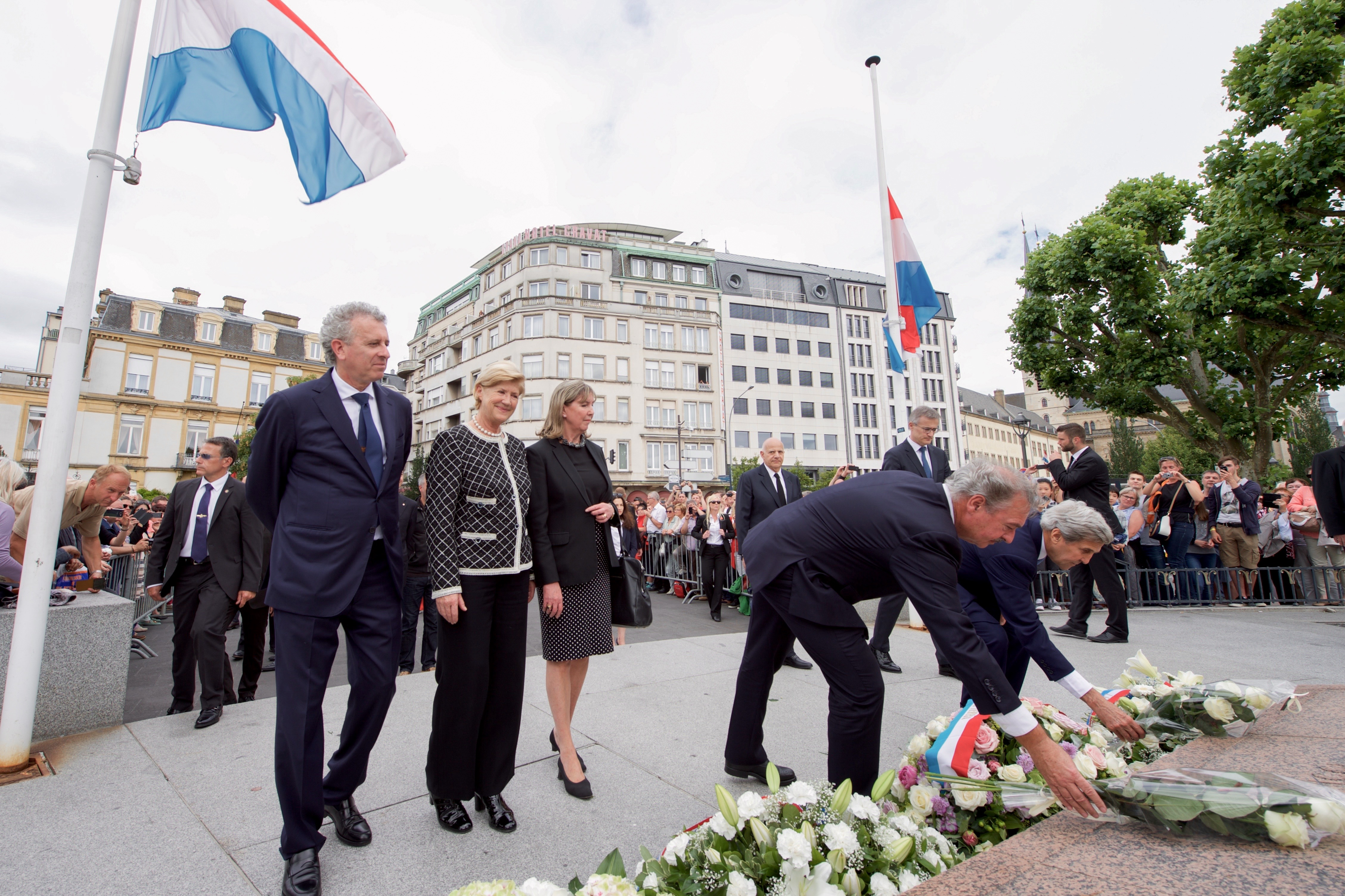
U.S Secretary of State John Kerry lays flowers at Monument of Remembrance in Luxembourg City, Luxembourg in response to the deadly terror attack in Nice, France.

- July 14 - Foreign Minister Retno Marsudi was alerted after Mohamed Lahouaiej-Bouhlel slammed his 19-tonne lorry into crowd of people in Nice celebrating Bastille Day, killing 86 people. Indonesians were urged to stay calm and went home. The Indonesian Government later issued a statement of condemnation to the attack.
- July 19
  - Fake Vaccine:
    - Massive protests from the public as mass distribution of fake vaccine revealed by Indonesia's National Police. Families affected by the vaccine became angry by hospital officials.
    - Fake vaccine became a national debate as Indonesian police found out that the vaccine had been produced and distributed for 13 years.
  - Operation Tinombala:
    - Indonesia's most wanted terrorist, Santoso, was shot dead in Poso, Central Sulawesi after police conducted a manhunt for Santoso. His henchman was also shot dead on the scene.

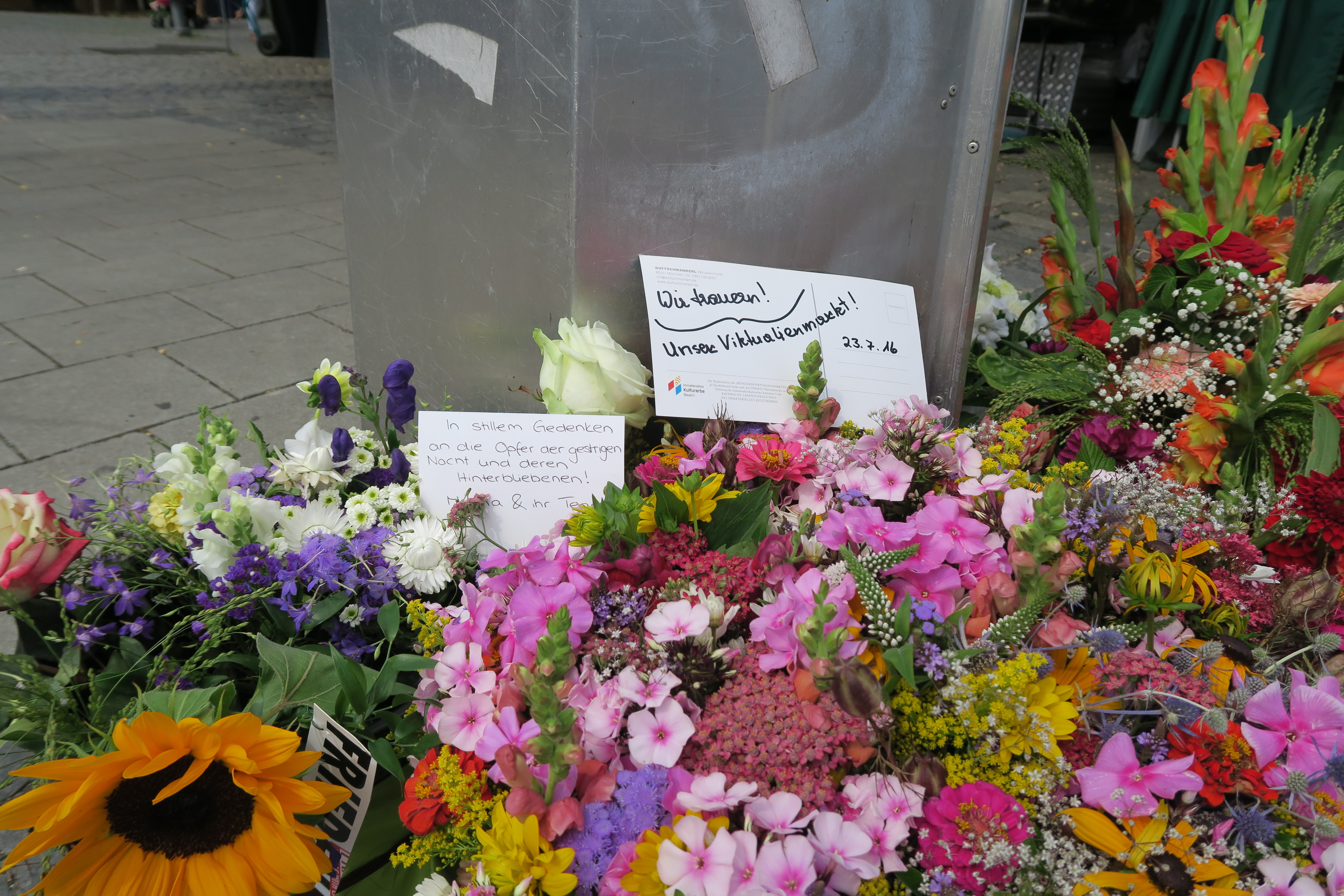
Flowers and condolence letters to the victims of the shooting in Munich, Germany.

- July 22 - After a shooting rampage in Olympia shopping mall in Munich, Germany, the Minister of Foreign Affair was alerted by authorities. Hundreds of Indonesians who live in Munich were urged to calm. German authorities urged people to stay indoors and shut down all transportation system in the city.
- July 23
  - A ship carrying at least 30 Indonesians capsizes on the water off Johor Bahru, Malaysia. The ship was travelling from Johor Bahru to Batam when it capsizes. At least 20 people were missing. Search and Rescue Agency were deployed to the scene and evacuated 14 bodies from the sea. 34 people survived the accident.
  - Operation Tinombala: Santoso's wife was apprehended by the police.
- July 25 - Fictional graves in Jakarta shocked the public.
- July 27 - Cabinet reshuffle - President Joko Widodo reshuffled his ministerial cabinet.
- July 28 - Operation Tinombala: A friendly fire occurred during the manhunt operation for the remaining terrorists in the forest of Poso. One soldier was shot dead after being mistakenly identified by his fellow soldier.
- July 29 - 4 convicted drug traffickers were executed on the island of Nusakambangan. The other 10 drug traffickers, including the one from India and Pakistan, were spared.
- July 30 - Riots occurred throughout the city of Tanjung Balai, North Sumatra. Rioters burn several Buddhist temple and destroyed several vehicles. The riot was caused due to mistreatment of the Mount Sinabung eruption's refugee. Hundreds of police personnel were deployed onto the scene of the riot. The riot was deemed as a "racial" riot.

=== August ===
- August 1 - Mount Barujari erupted, prompting the closure of Lombok International Airport in Lombok.

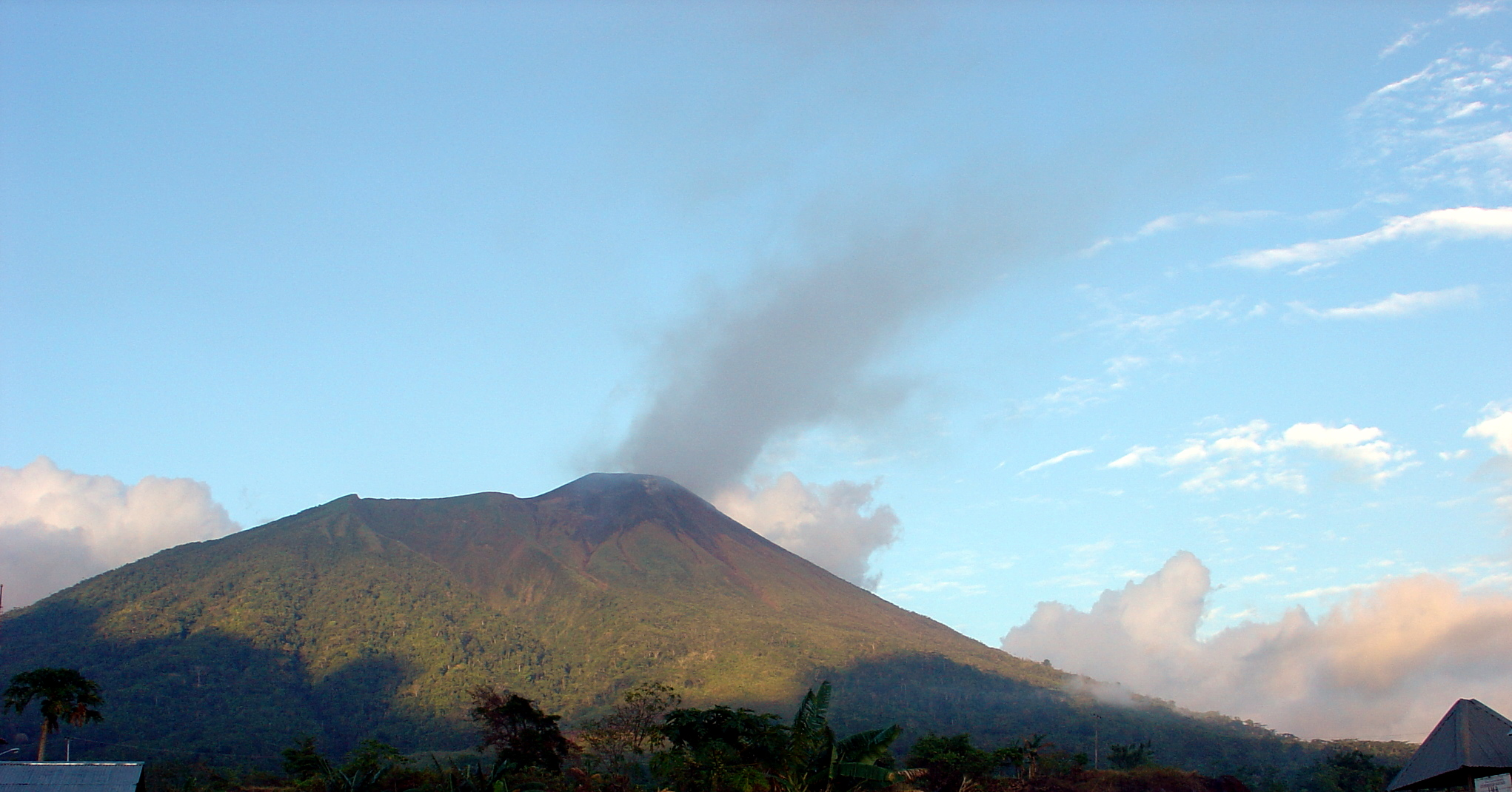
Mount Gamalama erupted in Ternate

- August 4
  - Mount Gamalama erupted in Ternate, local residents were advised to stay away from area around the mountain.
  - A snack entitled "Snack Bikini" became popular and controversial.

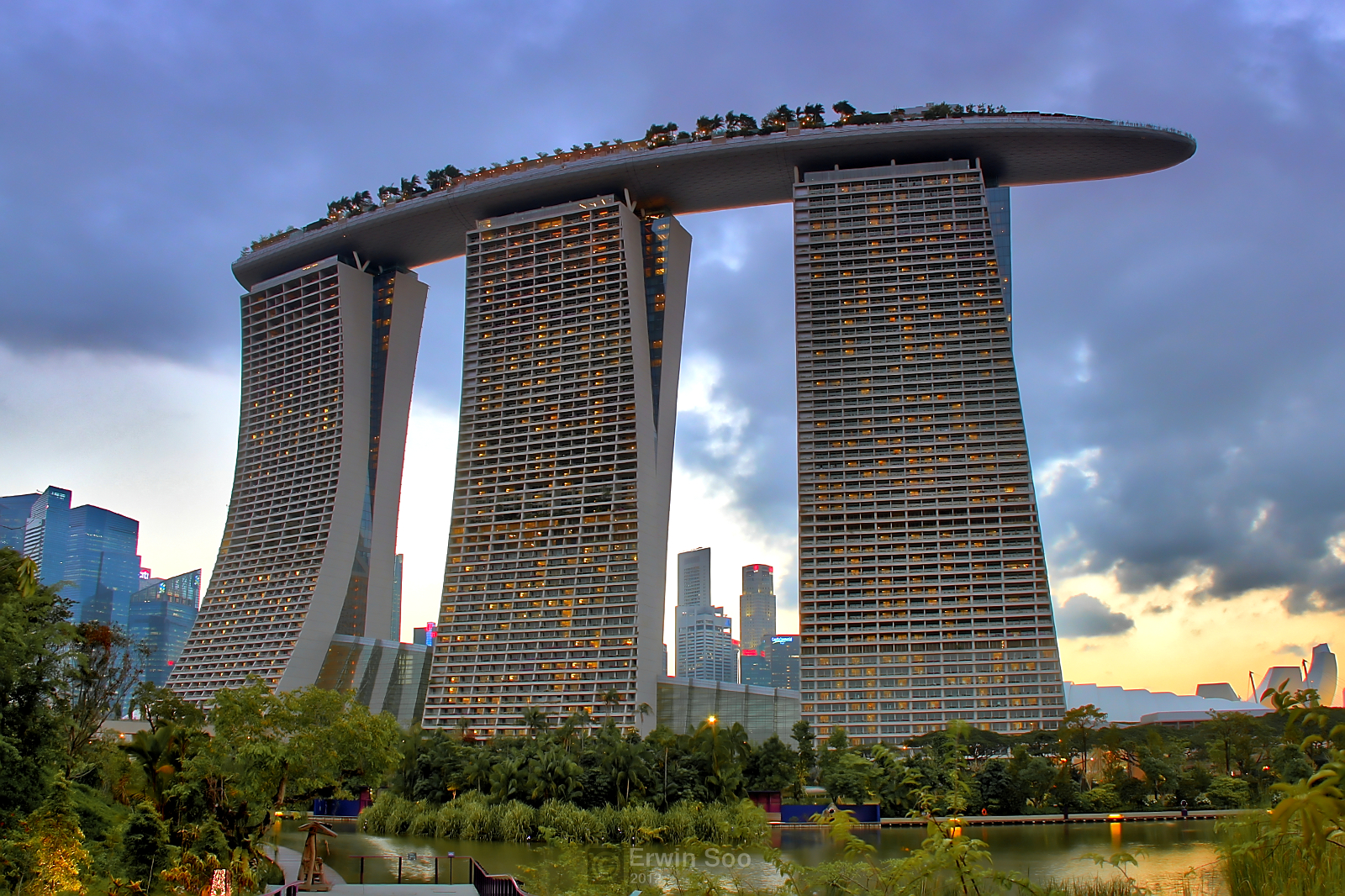
Terrorist in Batam attempted to attack Marina Bay Sands in Singapore using rocket launchers

- August 5 - Singapore terror plot:
  - Indonesian police raided and arrested 6 people in Batam. Police suspected that they were planning an attack on Marina Bay Sands in Singapore with a rocket launched from the island. The group was affiliated by Bahrun Naim, the group that ordered Nur Rohman, the perpetrator of the July's Solo bombing. Though the group was planning to attack Marina Bay Sands with rockets, anti-terror squad didn't find any rockets on the scene.
  - Singaporean Government issued a statement declaring that they were grateful with the finding and would cooperate more with the Indonesian authorities.
- August 7 - The new Minister of Education and Culture Muhadjir opined that Indonesia should apply Full Day School program in which students would learn in school for a total of 12 hour. It would be applied on every school in Indonesia. Students would learn from 06.00 AM until 06.00 PM.

Video of Kelapa Gading fire

- August 8
  - Muhadjir explained about the importance of Full Day School Program. The program later became an intense national debate in Indonesia, and was not welcomed warmly both from students nor parents. Muhadjir stated that students won't study at Saturday anymore as the compensation of Full Day School program.
  - A massive fire occurred on the 27th floor of a planned Swiss-Belhotel building in Kelapa Gading, trapping at least 8 people. Several other people tried to escape with a rope. During their escape, two people slipped and fell from a high height. Both of them were pronounced dead. A total of 14 people were injured in the blaze.
- August 10 - Haze disaster looms Indonesia as new hotspots began to appear in Sumatra, Borneo and Sulawesi.
- August 11 - School violence in Makassar
  - Dasrul, a senior teacher in SMK 2 Makassar, South Sulawesi was beaten by a student parent, later identified as Ahmad Adnan, the teacher's former student. Initially, the boy, identified by initial as AS, was slapped by the teacher because the boy used harsh words to the teacher. Outraged, the boy called his father, Ahmad Adnan, and his father (along with the boy) beaten the teacher in front of the class. Dahrul suffered nose fracture and bleeding continuously. Doctor later stated that there were several permanent damages to his face.
  - Government officials, including Minister of Education and Culture Muhadjir, condemned the beating. Students from the school, along with the teachers and the Republic of Indonesia Teachers Association protested the beating. The boy was later expelled from the school and wouldn't be accepted to any school throughout the province.
  - Members of the People's Representatives stated that immediate action should be taken in order to protect every teachers in Indonesia while doing their duties.
- August 14 - Dual Nationality Issues - The new Minister of Energy and Natural Resources Arcandra Tahar sparked a national debate and controversy after findings revealed that he had dual nationality, an Indonesian and a U.S citizenship. Indonesia only allowed someone to have a dual nationality until 18 year old. Subsequently, he was "put off duty" by President Joko Widodo due to the dual nationality issues.
- August 16 - A national flag raising team member was revealed to have a dual nationality. Identified as a Senior High School student Gloria Natapradja Hamel, an Indonesian citizen and French citizen. She was expelled from the national flag raising team for Indonesia Independence Day on August 17. A petition to allow her to come back to the group was made shortly after the incident.
- August 17
  - Happiness and joy as Gloria Natapradja was accepted as one of the members of the national flag lowering team.
  - Indonesians rejoiced as they won their first and only gold medal in the 2016 Summer Olympics.
- August 18 - The Indonesian Government confirmed that 2 Indonesians hostages had escaped from Abu Sayyaf and had been found by locals. One hostages escaped when he was about to be beheaded.

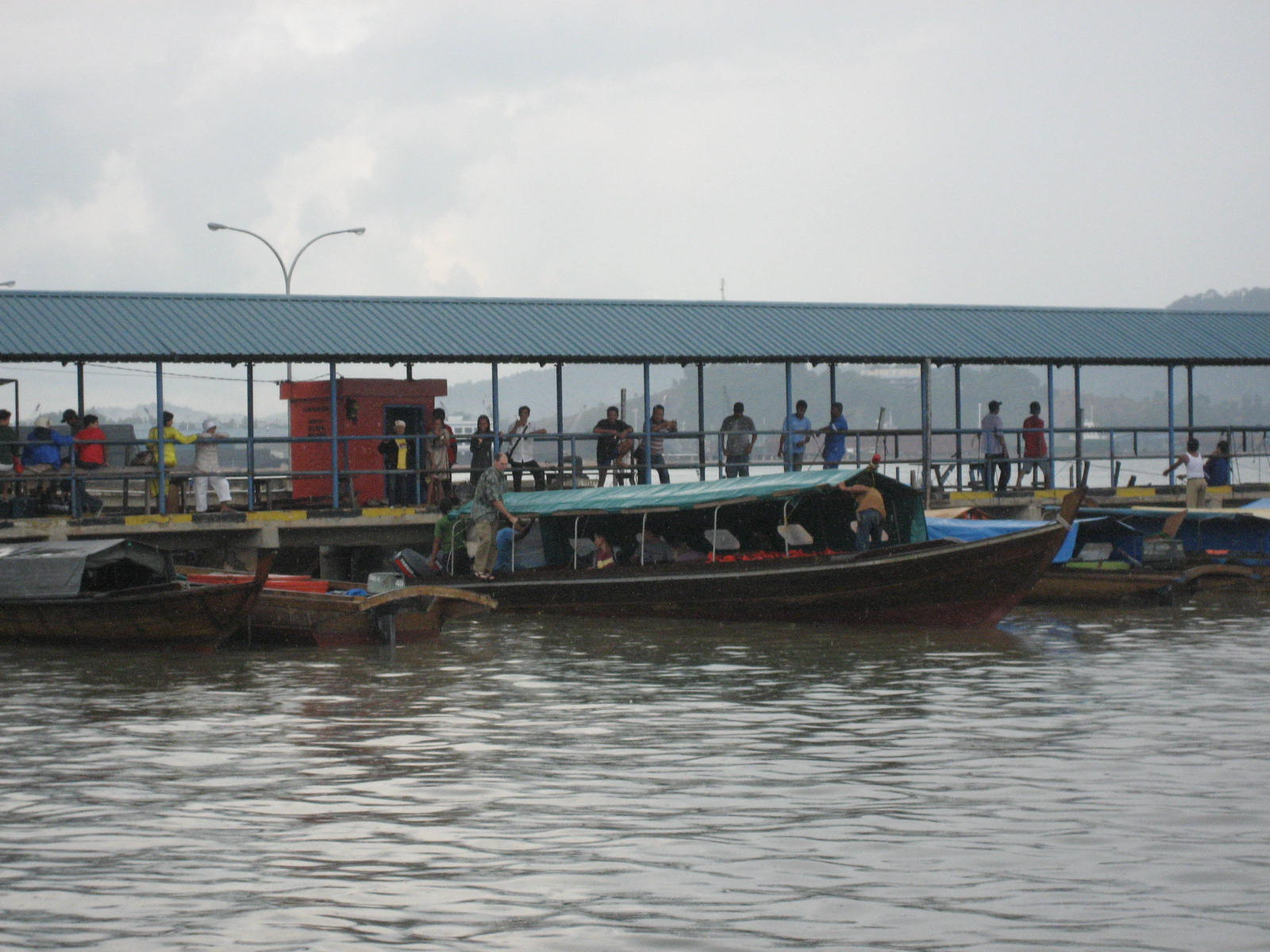
A pompong boat at Batam Island, near Tanjung Pinang

- August 20
  - Two foreign tourists, one Australian and one British, were arrested by Indonesian Police due to suspected murder of Wayan Sudarsa, an Indonesian police officer.
  - A native Riau Islands' boat called pompong, carrying 17 people including 2 children sank off the coast of Tanjung Pinang, the provincial capital of Riau Islands Province. The boat was heading to Penyengat Island, a popular tourist island when it sank during thunderstorm. Search and rescue team found 10 bodies and rescued two survivors. Five others were still missing.
- August 21
  - 177 Indonesian hajj pilgrims were found using Philippines passports instead of Indonesian passports, leading to a possible, "loss of Indonesian citizenship".
  - 5 missing people from the boat accident in Tanjung Pinang has been found, lifeless.
- August 23 - Plan to raise cigarettes' price from typical Rp.18.000-Rp.20.000 to Rp.50.000 sparked an intense debate between smokers and non-smokers.
- August 28 - Inspired by the church attack in Normandy, Mohammad Irfan detonated his homemade bomb while a mass was taking place in a church in Medan. After his bomb failed to explode, he chased the priest and tried to kill him with a knife, later overpowered by the people of the church. Police stated that the bomber had a connection with Bahrun Naim, and would be rewarded Rp.10 million if he succeed.
- August 29 - Philippines arrested 5 people over fake hajj passports.

=== September ===
- September 11 - Anniesa Hasibuan makes history as the first Indonesian designer in the New York Fashion Week and the first in the history of the event that features "a collection of hijabs in every look".
- September 12 - Massive explosion occurred on the suburb of Makassar, South Sulawesi. The explosion was caused due to gas leak. Damages in the neighborhood were massive, with cars flipped and buildings destroyed.
- September 15 - An explosion occurred on board the Gili Cat 2 ship in Bali while en route to Gili Trawangan, a popular island resort. 2 people were killed and 20 people were injured in the incident. Police suspected that the fuel tank located on the rear of the boat contacted a faulty wire on the boat, causing a short circuit that led to the explosion.
- September 17 - A grenade was thrown into a Local Representative's car and exploded in Bener Meriah, Aceh Province. 2 people were killed instantly, including a 5-year-old boy. The third was pronounced dead at hospital. A manhunt was ordered immediately after the blast.
- September 19
  - Three Indonesians that had previously taken hostages by Philippines terrorist group Abu Sayyaf were released.
  - Garut flash flood - A massive, 'tsunami-like' flash flood struck the city of Garut during the early hours of September 19. The Cimanuk River suddenly overflow, and a large, massive wall of water suddenly swept the residential area around the river. At least 30 people were killed when the flood struck the city. Most of them were killed while in their sleep. 22 people were missing. Preliminary report suggests that 100 houses went missing during the disaster and 300 houses were either damaged or destroyed
- September 22
  - Conflict arose between Google and the Indonesian Government as Google accused by the Indonesian Government for tax evasion.
  - Another Indonesian identified as Herman has been released by Abu Sayyaf in the Philippines.
- September 24 - A pedestrian bridge in Jakarta collapsed during a massive storm. 3 people were killed in the incident. Several people blamed the weather condition for the cause of the collapse, while several others stated that advertising billboards on the bridge might have caused an overloading, causing the collapse.
- September 26 - Rioters burned the second floor of Gowa's Local Representative Building in Gowa, South Sulawesi. The arson started after a fight broke out during the protest.
- September 28 - A video of a young Indonesian diplomat Nara Masista Rakhmatia complaining about the statements of Papuan human rights violations made by Oceanian leaders from Solomon Islands, Vanuatu, Nauru, Marshall Islands, Tuvalu, and Tonga went viral in Indonesia. During the United Nations General Assembly, the six nations that complained about human rights condition in Papua were mocked and accused by the Indonesian Government for "falsely report and accusing Indonesians for Papuans human rights violations.

=== October ===
- October 2 - Three Indonesians, who had been held hostage by Abu Sayyaf, were released in Sulu.
- October 3 -A woman, identified as Mutmainah, was arrested by the police after mutilating her own children in Cengkareng. News of the incident was widely shared on social media.
- October 7 - A boat carrying 25 people sank in Bengawan Solo River. At least 7 people went missing, most of them were teenagers.
- October 9 - All 7 missing people from Bengawan Solo boat accident were found, none survived.
- October 11 - A bomb exploded inside Golkar politician Marthinus Werimon's house in Kotaraja, Jayapura. No one was killed or injured in the incident, with only minimal damages were reported.
- October 12 - At least 172 houses were destroyed and a further 265 houses were damaged after a tornado struck the city of Pangandaran, West Java. One person was killed indirectly.
- October 13 - Following an outcry by campaigners and the Indonesian people, a new law on paedophiles was approved by the government. Paedophiles would face chemical castration and possibly execution under the new laws. The courts can also order the police to plant a microchip instead of a chemical castration to surveillance the paedophiles' movement.
- October 14 - After a long week of nationality issues, Archanda Tahar was inaugurated by President Joko Widodo as the Vice Minister of Energy and Human Resources, with Ignasius Jonan, the former Minister of Transportation, as the Minister of Energy and Human Resources.
- October 15 - A speedboat carrying more than 40 people caught fire shortly after departing Jailolo Harbour in West Halmahera. At least 41 people were injured and 4 people were killed in the incident. Police stated that the fire started when one of the engines failed. The fire then contacted gasoline and ignited a massive fire.
- October 16 - A suspension bridge, named by the local as the Yellow Bridge in Klungkung, Bali, collapsed. At least 8 people were killed in the incident, 34 others were injured. Eyewitnesses stated that the slings that were holding the weight of the bridge suddenly snapped. This structural failure could have been caused by overloading, as witnesses stated that there were many people and motorcycles seconds before the collapse.
- October 20
  - Indonesia ratified the Paris Agreement.
  - An ISIS supporter, identified as Sultan Azianzah from South Tangerang, attacked three police officers in Tangerang police department with a knife. Sultan was shot by police and later pronounced dead at hospital. Two pipe bombs were recovered in the area near the attack site.
- October 23 - A massive explosion occurred on a Pizza Hut Delivery building in Bekasi. The blast were so massive that a supermarket nearby were completely destroyed. Several structures located nearby the blast site were also suffered major damages. Several people were injured in the blast but no one was killed. Police stated that the blast might have been caused by a leak of a 50 kg gas tube.
- October 25 - Puteri Indonesia Perdamaian 2016, Ariska Putri Pertiwi was crowned Miss Grand International 2016 in the coronation night held at Las Vegas Strip, in Las Vegas, United States. She was the first ever Indonesian to win Miss Grand beauty pageant, one of the grand slam pageant in the world.
- October 27 - Indonesian murderer Jessica Kumala Wongso was convicted guilty and was sentenced to 20 years in jail after proved to have murdered Wayan Mirna Salihin on 6 January 2016.
- October 31 - A DHC-4 Caribou carrying construction materials with 4 crews on board went missing over Ilaga Pass while on approach to Ilaga.

=== November ===
- November 1
  - The wreckage of the missing DHC-4 Caribou has been found by Indonesian search and rescue team. The aircraft had impacted a hill and was pulverized by the impact. No survivors were found on the crash site.
  - A nail bomb exploded on a roadside in Bantul after being stepped by a buffalo. No one was injured in the incident, but the buffalo was killed in the blast.
- November 2 - Batam ferry sinking - A ferry carrying 101 passengers and crews sank off the coast of Nongsa in Batam, Riau Islands. The ferry was carrying illegal Indonesian workers from Malaysia when it sank during a thunderstorm. Survivors stated that the ferry was docking at the time when a big wave struck and capsized on its side. 39 people survived the sinking, while 44 were missing. At least 18 bodies, including a 6 month old baby, were recovered from the sea. Search and Rescue Team were immediately assembled. A crisis centre was set up in Nongsa.
- November 3 - At least 54 bodies were recovered during search and rescue operation of the Batam ferry sinking.
- November 4 - November 4 protest - Thousands of hardliner Muslims joined a march in Jakarta to protest the province's ethnic Chinese and Christian Governor Basuki Tjahaja Purnama (known in Indonesia as Ahok) after his remarks on 5 October 2016 about Sura Al-Ma'ida Ayah 51 went viral on the internet. The remarks was made by him while campaigning in Pulau Pramuka, Kepulauan Seribu. The remarks sparked condemnation by hardline Muslims across Indonesia. The protest started peacefully early on the day, however it ended violently after several protesters refused to move from the protest area by the Indonesian Police. 350 people were hurt in the following clash, with 1 people died after suffering breathing problem.
- November 5 - President Joko Widodo addressed the nation in response to the November 4 protest and had asked Indonesians to stay calm.
- November 6 - 4 year old Intan Olivia Marbun was killed after a molotov bomb exploded in front of a church in Samarinda, East Kalimantan. The perpetrator, Muhammad Juhanda, and 3 toddlers were injured in the attack. The attack was inspired by ISIS, marking the third ISIS attack to occur in Indonesia in less than a month.
- November 17 - At least 37 houses were damaged after a strong, magnitude 5.8 earthquake rocked the city of Malang in East Java. No one was killed in the incident.
- November 19 - 15 people went missing after their boat collided with a Vietnamese vessel in Tuban, East Java.
- November 24 - A Bell 412 EP helicopter carrying 5 people on board went missing over Borneo while en route to Malinau Regency in North Kalimantan. The helicopter, registered as HA-5166, had its last contact with Tarakan Tower at 11.29 local time. A search and rescue team was deployed in response to the disappearance.
- November 25 - Anti-terror squad raided a house in Majalengka in West Java and arrested a terrorist in the operation. They found that the terrorist had bought materials for making bombs. Indonesian police confirmed that the blast would be three times more powerful than the bombs that had been used in the 2002 Bali bombings, in which a car bomb exploded in Legian Street, killing 202 people. The police later revealed that the terrorist was intended to attack several vital places in Jakarta, including the People's Representatives Council building, Indonesian Police Headquarters, Foreign embassies (including the U.S consulate), T.V stations, several "undisclosed" religious sites, and cafes in Jakarta. The attack was supposed to take place on the New Year's Eve. Had the attack occurred, the total number of casualties could surpass the number of victims in the 2002 Bali bombings.
- November 26 - Indonesian anti terror squad arrested a man in Northern Aceh suspected to be involved in the Majalengka terror plot.
- November 27
  - Search and rescue team found the wreckage of the helicopter that had gone missing over Borneo on November 24. At least 1 person survived the crash with injuries, while 3 people were killed in the crash. Their bodies were later recovered by search and rescue team. The pilot of the flight was still missing.
  - Indonesian Minister of Education and Social Culture Muhadjir stated his intention to remove the National Examination Test programme.

=== December ===
- December 2
  - A massive demonstration involving more than 200.000 hardliner Muslims was held in Jakarta. Protesters demanded for the imprisonment of Jakarta's Christian and Chinese Governor Basuki Tjahaja Purnama due to his remarks on 5 October about Sura Al-Ma'ida Ayah 51. The protest was peaceful unlike the previous on 4 November. However, reports had emerged that protesters attacked multiple journalists on the scene, which drew condemnation from the public.
  - The Indonesian National Police arrested 10 people suspected of "planning an assault to the government".
- December 3 - A PZL M28 Skytruck belonged to the Indonesian National Police lost contact with air traffic controller near Lingga, Riau Islands. The plane was approaching Batam when the incident occurred while carrying 13 police personnel. Local fishermen joined the search and rescue operation. Later, several personal belongings were retrieved from the sea near the area where the plane had lost contact.
- December 4 - The first body part from one of the passengers of the missing Skytruck was found by search and rescue team. All passengers and crews were declared dead.
- December 7 - Aceh earthquake - A shallow and violent magnitude 6.5 earthquake rocked the Aceh region on the morning of 7 December 2016, killing at least 104 people and injuring more than 1.000 people.
- December 10 - Indonesian National Police arrested three people in a homestay in Bekasi. In a press conference, investigators stated that the terrorist were using TATP explosives. Investigators said that the bombs were highly explosive and added that the terrorists were planning to execute the bombing on the Presidential Palace on 11 December 2016 during guards exchange.
- December 13 - Jakarta Governor Basuki Tjahaja Purnama attended his first blasphemy trial.
- December 18 - An Indonesian Air Force Lockheed C-130 Hercules slammed onto Mount Lisuwa in Wamena while on approach to Wamena Airport, killing all 13 people on board.
- December 21
  - Three terrorists were shot dead by the Indonesian National Police at a house in South Tangerang, West Java. Police then safely detonated the homemade bombs that they had discovered in the house. According to the police, the attackers were resisting arrests and threw bombs at the police, which forced them to shoot the terrorists on the spot. The police later added that the three terrorists were planning to attack police by throwing bombs into a police box during the New Year's Eve, similar to the earlier attack in Jakarta in January.
  - An Indonesian phrase, called "Om Telolet Om" went viral in social media and throughout the world. The phrase, translated in English as "Uncle, Honk Your Horn, Uncle" went viral after a video showing a group of children asked for a bus driver to honk their horn in Jepara, East Java was shared on social media (although several people claimed that the phrase went viral through spamming)"Om telolet om: Bus pertama yang membuat tren klakson ini mendunia". BBC News Indonesia. BBC Indonesia.
- December 25 - Indonesian Police shot dead 2 people after resisting arrests and assaulted police in Jatiluhur Dam, Purwakarta, West Java. Another 2 people were arrested. All of them were arrested due to "supporting terror attack" as they were planning to blown up the Jatiluhur Dam, according to the a paper founded by the police. Had the attack occurred, the whole Jakarta would be submerged in water and thousands could be killed in the act.
- December 27
  - 6 people were suffocated to death and 5 people were seriously injured when a group of armed robber held them as hostages inside a toilet with no ventilation. The robbery occurred in an elite neighborhood of Pulomas in East Jakarta. The victims were held for "several hours", which caused a lack of oxygen (hypoxia). A nationwide manhunt was ordered by the Chief of the National Police.
  - Former Head of the Indonesian National Football Association La Nyala Mataliti was convicted not guilty by prosecutor.
- December 28 - 2 people suspected as accomplices in the robbery in Pulomas were arrested by the police.

Drunk pilot's announcement aboard a Citlink flight

- December 30 - An incident involving a drunk pilot in Citilink Flight 800 had drawn widespread condemnation throughout the public and the government. The incident caused a national debate on the safety of the Indonesian aviation industry.

== Death ==
- Irena Justine - Actress (born 1993)
