= Loa Janan Ilir =

District of Samarinda, East Kalimantan

- District
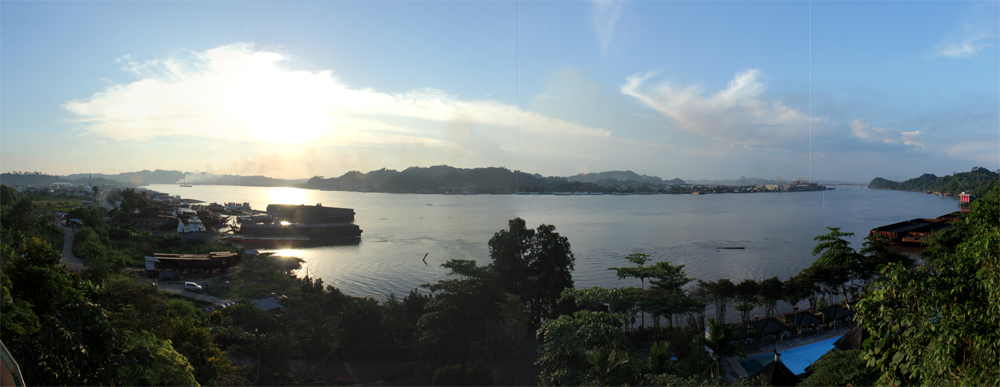
- Panorama of the Mahakam
- Interactive map of Loa Janan Ilir
- Location Loa Janan Ilir (Indonesia)
- Coordinates: 0°34′32.52166″S 117°6′49.24282″E
- Country: Indonesia
- Province: East Kalimantan
- Regency: Samarinda
- Established: 14 December 2010
- District seat: Simpang Tiga

Government
  - District head (Camat): Syahrudins

Area
  - Total: 26.13 km^{2} (10.09 sq mi)

Population (2023)
  - Total: 69,396
  - Density: 2,656/km^{2} (6,878/sq mi)
- Time zone: UTC+8 (ICT)
- Regional code: 64.72.10
- Villages: 5

Loa Janan Ilir (Indonesian pronunciation: [ˈloa ˈdʒanan ˈilɪr]) is a district in Samarinda, East Kalimantan, Indonesia. As of 2023, it was inhabited by 69,396 people, and currently has the total area of 26.13 km^{2}. Its district seat is located at the village of Simpang Tiga.

== History ==
Before 21 October 1987, the former village of Loa Janan Ilir (lit. 'Lower Loa Janan') was part of Loa Janan in Kutai Regency. From that date, it was transferred to Samarinda Seberang, along with Loa Bakung and Loa Buah to Samarinda Ulu (both then became part of Sungai Kunjang in 1996). On 22 February 2006, Loa Janan Ilir ceased to exist as a village and split into three, namely Simpang Tiga (parent), Sengkotek, and Tani Aman. At the same time, Rapak Dalam was separated from Baqa (the two villages now belong into two separate districts).

Loa Janan Ilir was reestablished as a district on 14 December 2010, by creating from southern parts (5 villages) of Samarinda Seberang.

== Governance ==
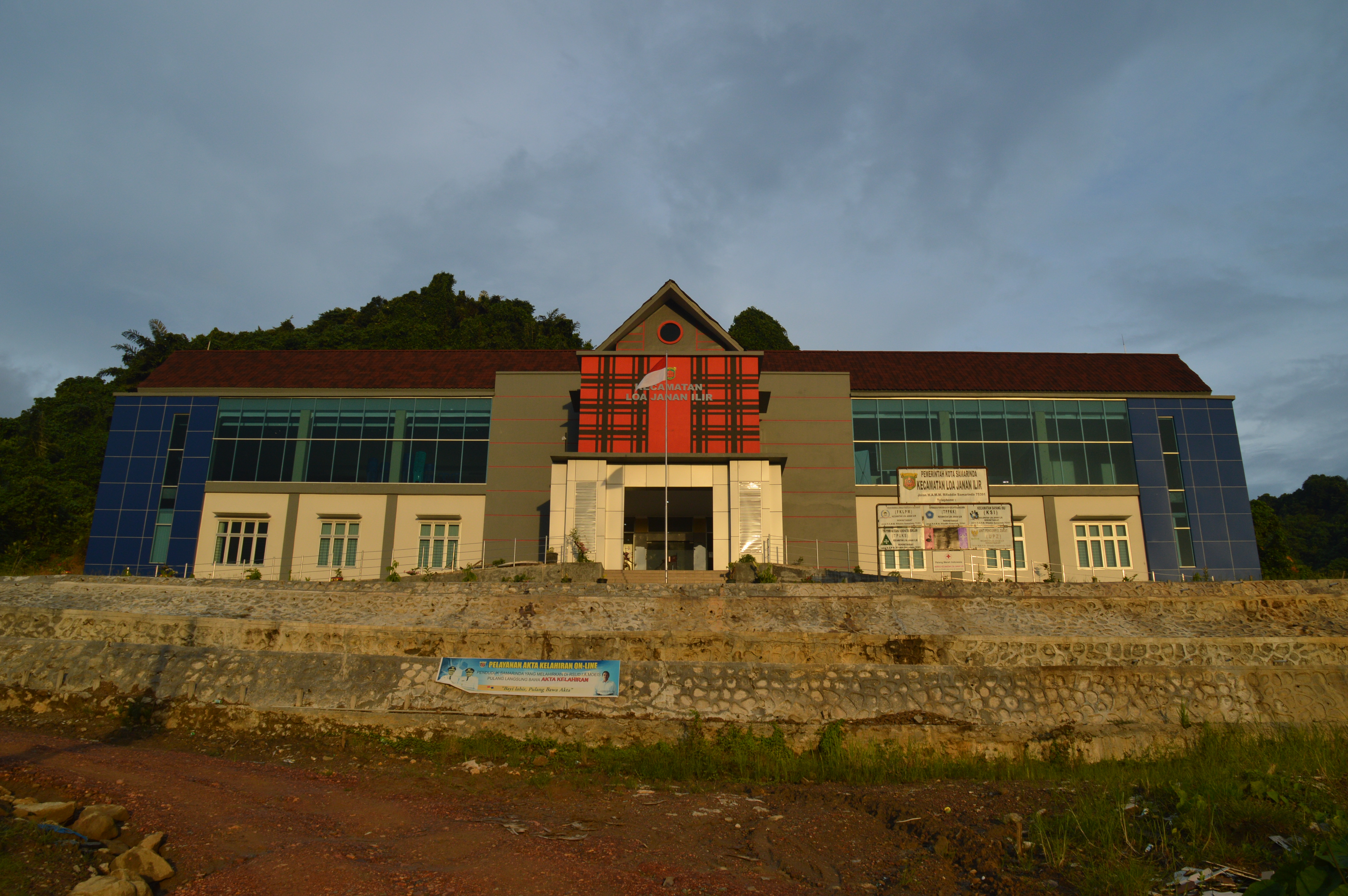
District head office at Simpang Tiga, Loa Janan Ilir.

=== Villages ===
Loa Janan Ilir is divided into the following 5 villages (kelurahan):

Regional code (Kode wilayah)	Name	Area (km^{2})	Population (2023)	Density (2023)	RT (rukun tetangga)
64.72.10.1001	Simpang Tiga	4.21	12,701	3,017	30
64.72.10.1002	Tani Aman	3.92	9,699	2,474	20
64.72.10.1003	Sengkotek	4.95	7,122	1,439	20
64.72.10.1004	Harapan Baru	6.33	17,759	2,806	43
64.72.10.1005	Rapak Dalam	6.72	22,115	3,291	29
	Totals	26.13	69,396	2,656	142
