= Samarinda Seberang =

District of Samarinda, East Kalimantan

- District
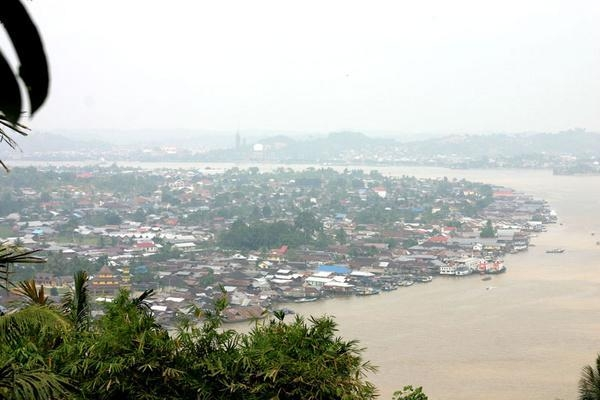
- View of the Mahakam
- Interactive map of Samarinda Seberang
- Location in Kalimantan and Indonesia Samarinda Seberang (Indonesia)
- Coordinates: 0°30′36.000″S 117°8′18.168″E
- Country: Indonesia
- Province: East Kalimantan
- Regency: Samarinda
- Established: 19 December 1923
- District seat: Baqa

Government
  - District head (Camat): Aditya Koesprayogi

Area
  - Total: 11.72 km^{2} (4.53 sq mi)

Population (2023)
  - Total: 65,796
  - Density: 5,614/km^{2} (14,540/sq mi)
- Time zone: UTC+8 (ICT)
- Postal code: 75131 - 75133
- Regional code: 64.72.02
- Villages: 6

Samarinda Seberang (Indonesian pronunciation: [samaˈrinda səˈbəraŋ], lit. 'Samarinda opposite (of the Mahakam)') is a district of Samarinda, East Kalimantan, Indonesia. As of 2023, it was inhabited by 65,796 people, and currently has a total area of 11.72 km^{2}. Its district seat is located at the village of Baqa.

Samarinda Seberang was legally established as a separate district by a decree of self-government (zelfbestuurbesluit) dated 19 December 1923 by Dutch colonial authorities (approved on 11 March 1924), making it the oldest existing district in the city. On 14 December 2010, the district of Loa Janan Ilir was separated from Samarinda Seberang.

== Governance ==
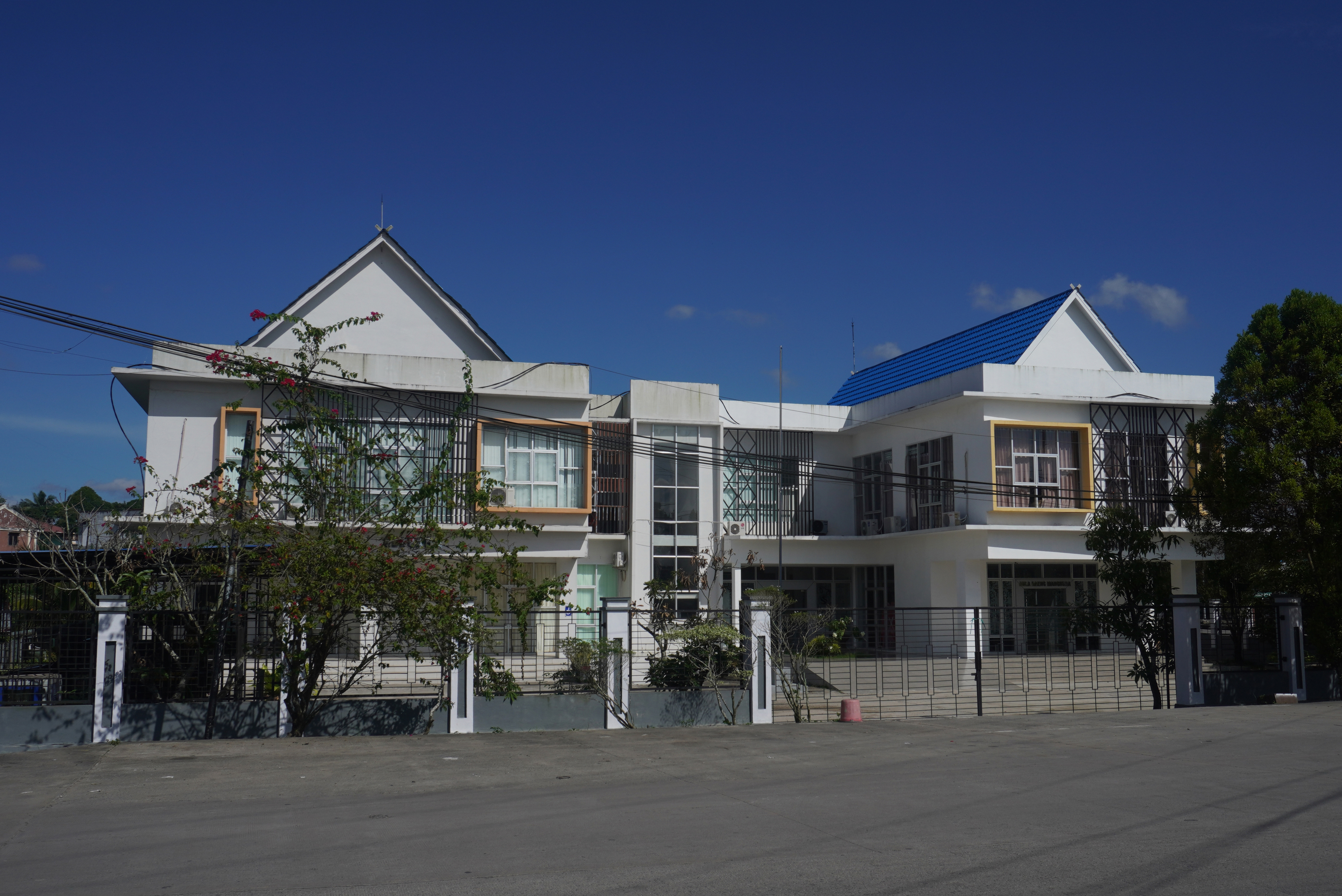
District head office at Baqa, Samarinda Seberang.

=== Villages ===
Samarinda Seberang is divided into the following 6 villages (kelurahan):

Regional code (Kode wilayah)	Name	Area (km^{2})	Population (2023)	RT (rukun tetangga)
64.72.02.1001	Sungai Keledang	3.00	17,351	36
64.72.02.1002	Baqa	1.18	14,799	22
64.72.02.1003	Mesjid	0.58	13,719	21
64.72.02.1009	Mangkupalas	1.74	9,418	19
64.72.02.1010	Tenun; Tenun Samarinda	0.41	6,519	13
64.72.02.1011	Gunung Panjang	3.30	3,990	8
	Totals	11.72	65,796	170

The villages of Mangkupalas, Tenun [Samarinda] (from Mesjid), and Gunung Panjang (from Sungai Keledang) were created on 12 August 2014.
