= 2016 Samarinda church bombing =

Terrorist attack in Indonesia

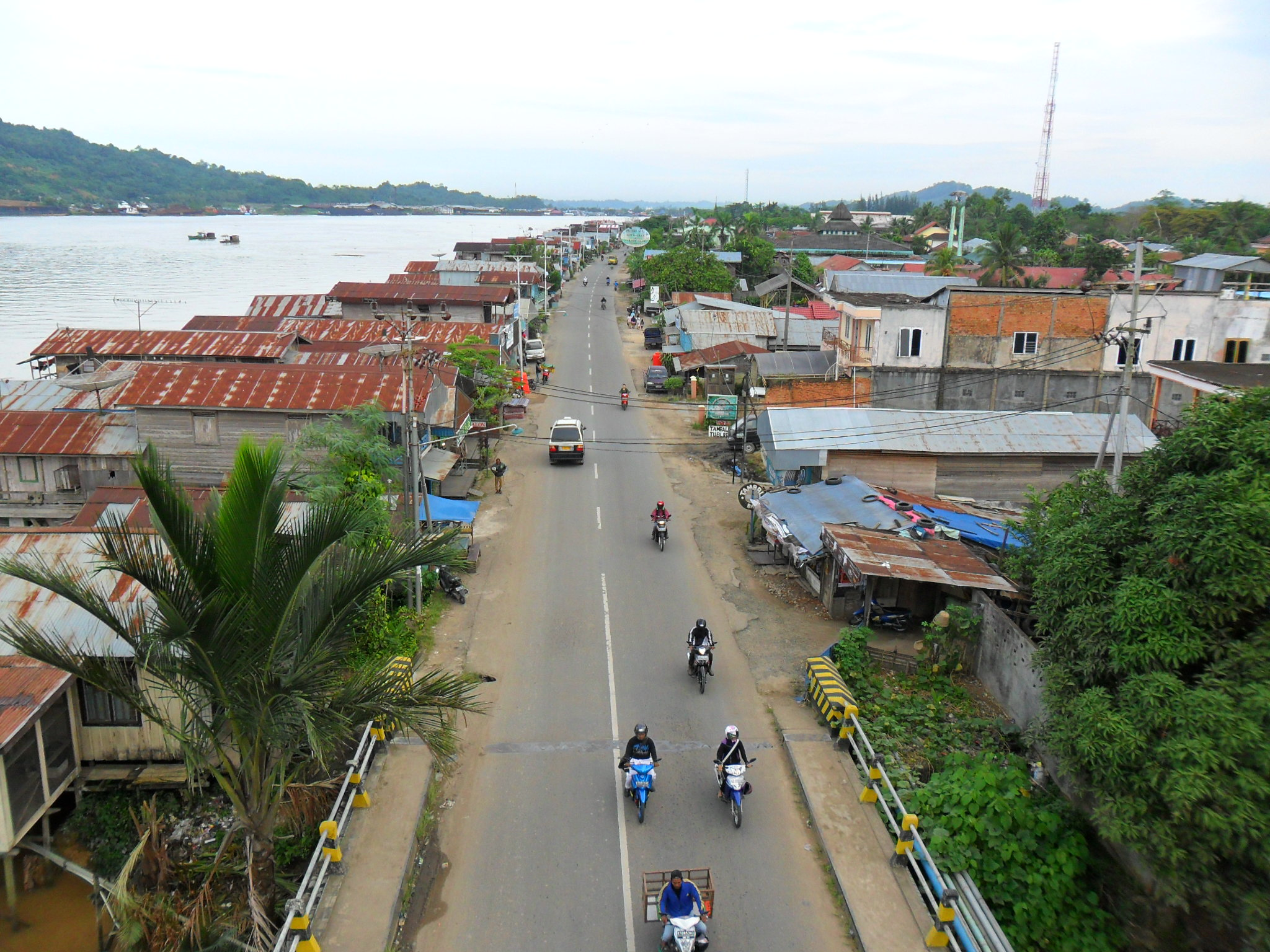
- Sengkotek, Samarinda, the location of the bombing
- Location: Oikumene Church, Sengkotek, Loa Janan Ilir, Samarinda, East Kalimantan, Indonesia
- Date: November 13, 2016; 10:10 WITA (UTC+8)
- Target: Christians
- Attack type: Bombing; terrorist attack
- Weapon: Molotov bomb
- Deaths: 1
- Injuries: 4 (including the perpetrator)
- Perpetrators: Juhanda, out of sympathy for the Islamic State of Iraq and the Levant
- Assailant: Juhanda
- No. of participants: 5

A terrorist attack occurred on November 13, 2016, when a man named Juhanda detonated a Molotov bomb in front of Oikumene Church in Loa Janan Ilir, Samarinda, East Kalimantan, Indonesia, where children were playing. A toddler was killed in the incident and three other toddlers were injured. In September 2017, Juhanda and four others were convicted of the attack, with Juhanda sentenced to life imprisonment, while the others received sentences ranging from six to seven years.

The bombing was the second attack on church in Indonesia in 2016, with the first attack occurred in Medan on August when an ISIS sympathiser attacked a priest during a mass. It was also the second terror attack to occur in less than a month, after another ISIS sympathiser was shot dead after wounding three police officers with a machete in Tangerang.

== Bombing ==
The explosion occurred on 10:10 WITA (Central Indonesian Time), on Oikumene Church located on Dr. Cipto Mangunkusumo Road in Sengkotek, Loa Janan Ilir, Samarinda. Oikumene Church is the most popular church in Sengkotek. At the time, the prayer service had just finished and crowds were getting out from the church. Prosecutors said Juhanda traveled to the church by motorbike, carrying a bag full of black explosive powder and a fuse, intending to cause mass casualties. But instead it exploded when he fell from the bike in front of the church, where children were playing. Four toddlers were injured in the explosion. Juhanda immediately ran away, but later was caught by locals and people from the church after he fell into Mahakam River.

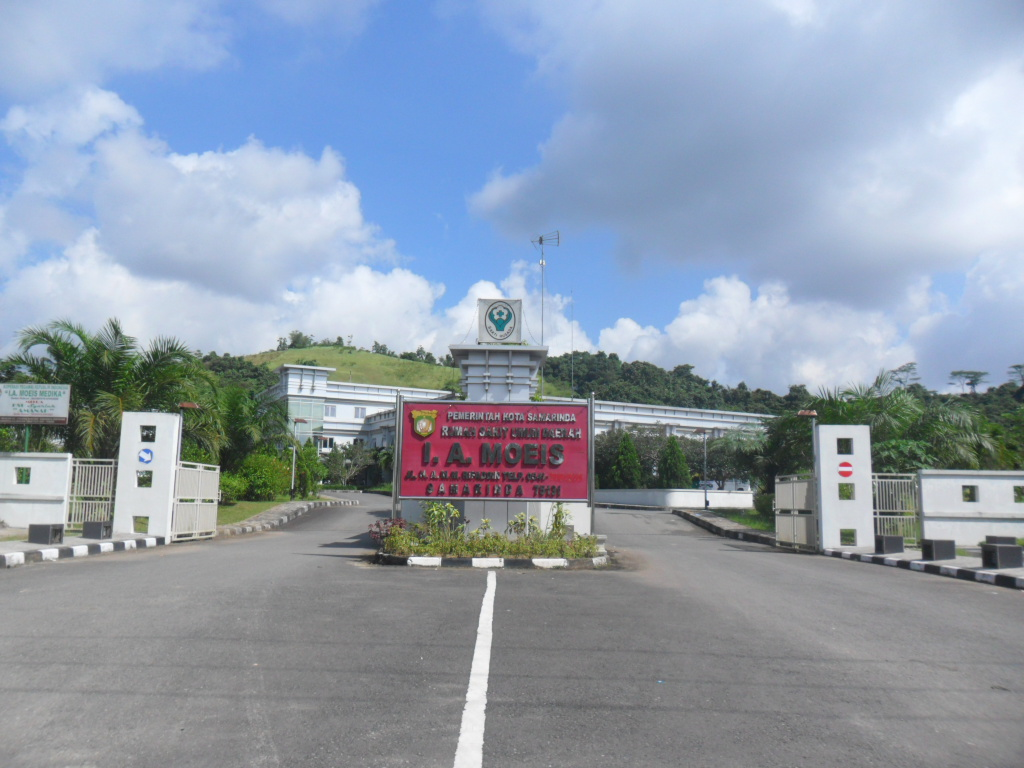
The injured were immediately taken to Samarinda's I.A Moeis Hospital

Firefighters, Indonesian National Police and its bomb disposal unit were immediately dispatched after the bombing. The injured, all of them toddlers with age ranging from two to four-year-old, were immediately taken by emergency services to Samarinda's main hospital, I.A Moeis Hospital. People from the church were evacuated from the area after the explosion. Two toddlers were critically injured in the incident. On 14 November, the next day of the bombing, 2-year-old Olivia Intan Marbun Banjarnahor, succumbed to her wounds and became the only fatality in the attack.

== Perpetrator ==
The perpetrator was identified by the Indonesian National Police as Juhanda, who had only been released from jail a few months before the Samarinda attack; he had been previously convicted of attempted terror against the Christ Cathedral in Jakarta, and a series of "book bombings" where explosives were hidden in books and sent to activists, both occurring in 2011. At the time, he joined a terrorist group identified by the police as Pepy Vernando. Before he lived in Samarinda, he settled in Bogor. He moved to Samarinda in 2015 and worked in local mosque. Juhanda was noticed by people shortly before the attack using a "Jihad, Way of life" T-shirt outside the church. He was sentenced to 3 years and 6 months in prison by the Jakarta's Civil Court on 29 February 2012. In July 2014, Juhanda was released due to Eid Al-Fitr remission and immediately joined another terrorist group in East Kalimantan, named as the JAD, which has a link with the Anshori Group, another terrorist group that could bring weapons from the Philippines.

On September 25, 2017, Juhanda was sentenced to life imprisonment. Juhanda was arrested and convicted along with four others, all five accused of belonging to the JAD group. The others received sentences ranging from six to seven years.

== Aftermath ==
Immediately after the incident, several high Muslim organisations in Indonesia, such as Nahdlatul Ulama and Indonesian Ulema Council (MUI) condemned the bombing, with MUI calling Intan's death as "a tragedy of humanity". President Joko Widodo immediately ordered the Indonesian National Police for a fully thorough investigation into the incident. The Chief of the Indonesian National Police General Tito Karnavian immediately stated to all Indonesians to "not panic" after the attack and stay calm. The Minister of Internal Affairs, Tjahjo Kumolo, immediately called the bombing as a terror attack. Jakarta's Religions Tolerance Forum condemned the bombing, calling it as "inhumane".

Security measures were immediately taken after the bombing. Indonesian National Police ordered security measures to be taken in Oikumene Church after the bombing. Similar measures were taken in churches in Medan and Yogyakarta. The Vice Governor of East Java stated that the East Java Government, including the police, Indonesian National Soldier and Ulema to stay alert after the incident, and taken a "precaution steps" in order to detect terrorism in the region.

Shortly after the news of Intan's death broke, the hashtag #RIPIntan went viral on social media, with many Indonesians shared their disbelief and condemned the attack, especially knowing that the victim was a toddler. News articles and media in Indonesia immediately stated their sorrows and regrets for "not guarding Intan". Thousands of condolences were sent to Intan's relatives and next of kin. Those who sent condolences include President Joko Widodo, Ridwan Kamil, and many other political figures in Indonesia. On 14 November, a candlelight vigil, attended by hundreds of people, was held in Hotel Indonesia Roundabout (Bundaran HI) in Jakarta. Similar vigils were held throughout Indonesia, including in Samarinda and Pontianak. In Manado, the vigil was attended by hundreds of people from many religious beliefs. In Ambon, a peace rally was held immediately after the blast. Shortly after the incident, Muslim volunteers in Samarinda joined churchgoers to clean their church. Tolerance were shown between Muslims and non-Muslims in Purwakarta, Banyuwangi and Papua. A painting dedicated for Intan, depicting Intan as an angel with wings behind her back, immediately went viral after the incident.
