= Samarinda Islamic Center Mosque =

Mosque in Samarinda, East Kalimantan, Indonesia

Coordinates: 0°30′9.1″S 117°7′11.8″E

Samarinda Islamic Center Mosque Masjid Baitul Muttaqien
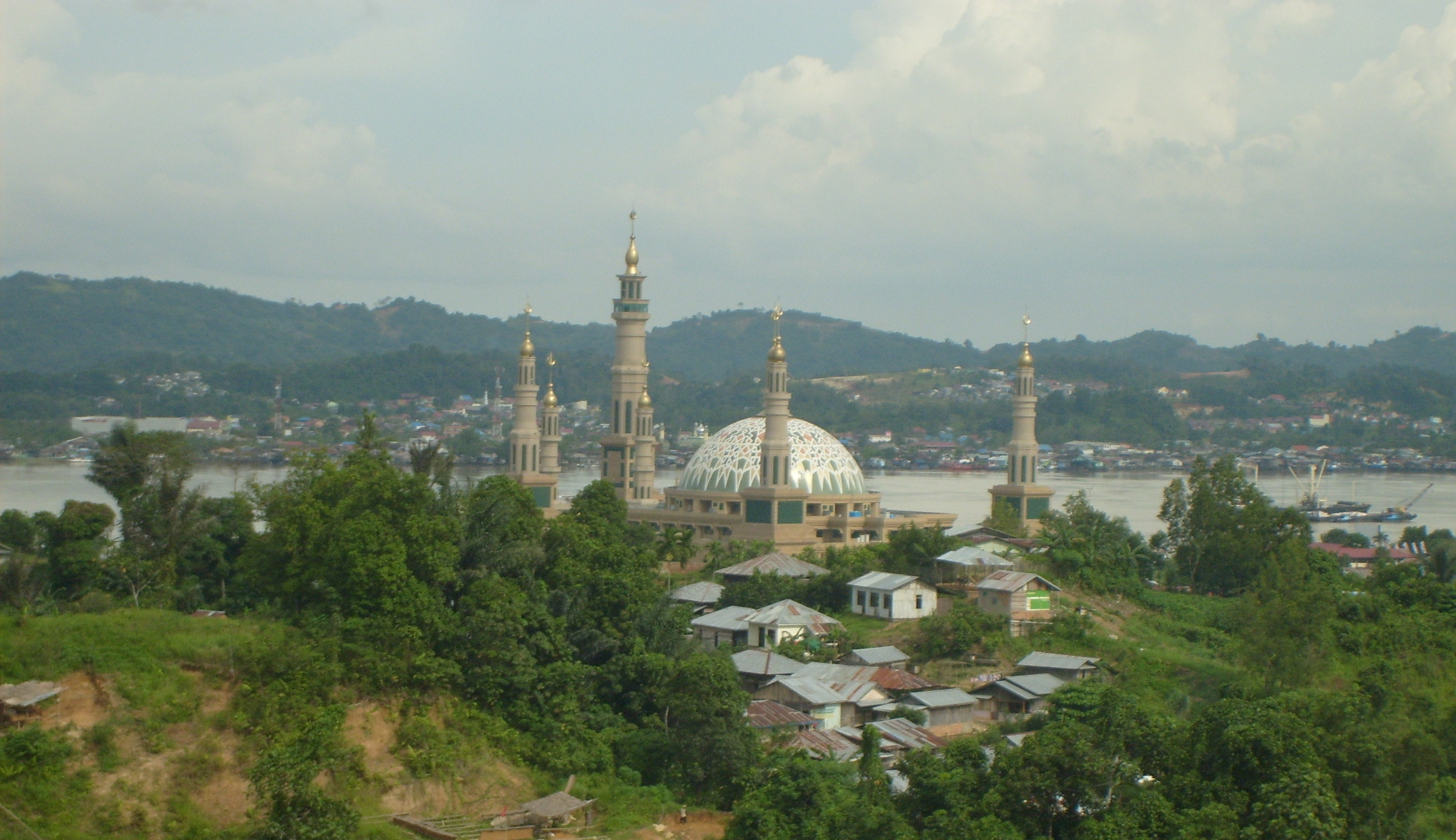

Religion
- Affiliation: Islam
- Branch/tradition: Sunni

Location
- Location: Samarinda, East Kalimantan, Indonesia
- Interactive map of Samarinda Islamic Center Mosque; Masjid Baitul Muttaqien

Architecture
- Type: Mosque
- Groundbreaking: 43.500 m^{2}

Specifications
- Capacity: 10.000 pilgrims
- Minaret: 7
- Minaret height: 99 meters

The Samarinda Islamic Center Mosque, also known as the Baitul Muttaqien Mosque, is a mosque located in the subdistrict of Teluk Lerong Ulu, Sungai Kunjang, Samarinda, East Kalimantan, Indonesia, and is one of the largest mosques in Southeast Asia. It is situated at the foreground of the Mahakam River, and it has seven minarets and a huge dome.

== Description ==
The mosque has a building area of 43,500 square meters, a supporting building area of 7,115 square meters and a basement floor area of 10,235 square meters. The ground floor of the mosque has an area of 10,270 square meters and the main floor has an area of 8,185 square meters. The mezzanine floor area (balcony) is 5,290 square meters. This location was formerly a sawmill area owned by PT Inhutani I which was then granted to the Provincial Government of East Kalimantan.

The mosque has seven minarets, and the main tower reaches 99 meters, which is a reference to the Asmaul Husna, or the 99 names of Allah. The main tower consists of building with 15 floors and each floor has height of an average of 6 meters. Meanwhile, stairs from the ground floor to the main floor of the mosque amount to 33 steps. This amount is deliberately equated with one-third the number of Islamic prayer beads. In addition to the main tower, this building also has six minarets on the side of the mosque. Four of them are located in each corner of the mosque and reach 70-meter-high, and two of them are at the gate and reaches 57-meter-high. The six towers also mean Six Pillars of Islam.

== Gallery ==
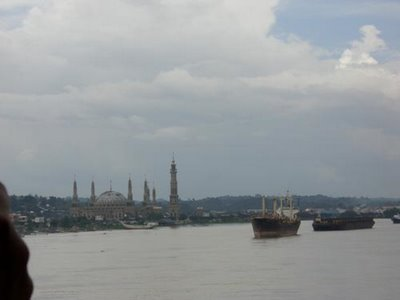
Mosque seen from the Mahakam Bridge.

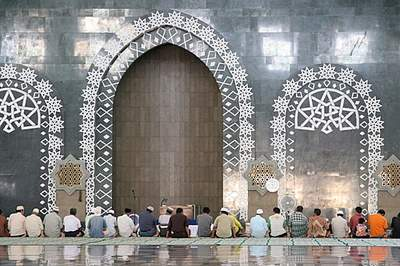
Friday prayer at the mosque.

== See also ==
- List of mosques in Indonesia
