= Sungai Kunjang =

District of Samarinda, East Kalimantan

- District
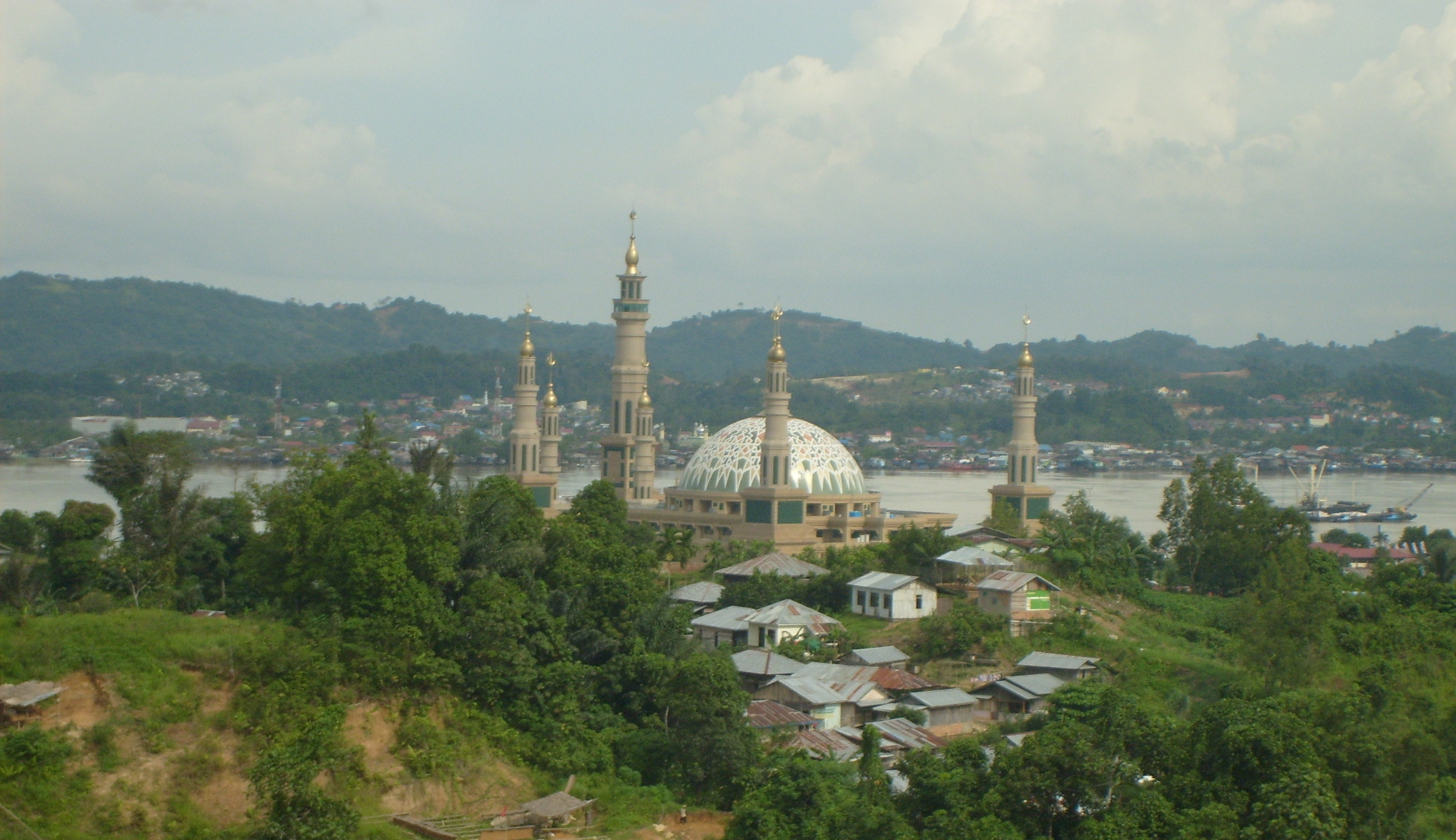
- Samarinda Islamic Center Mosque
- Interactive map of Sungai Kunjang
- Location in Kalimantan and Indonesia Sungai Kunjang (Indonesia)
- Coordinates: 0°30′52.36319″S 117°5′33.30204″E
- Country: Indonesia
- Province: East Kalimantan
- Regency: Samarinda
- Established: 11 June 1996
- District seat: Loa Bakung

Government
  - District head (Camat): Dwi Siti Noorbayah

Area
  - Total: 43.04 km^{2} (16.62 sq mi)

Population (2023)
  - Total: 139,320
  - Density: 3,237/km^{2} (8,384/sq mi)
- Time zone: UTC+8 (ICT)
- Postal code: 75125 - 75127
- Regional code: 64.72.06
- Villages: 7

Sungai Kunjang (Indonesian pronunciation: [ˌsuŋai̯ ˈkundʒaŋ]) is a district of Samarinda, East Kalimantan, Indonesia. As of 2023, it was inhabited by 139,320 people, and currently has a total area of 43.04 km^{2}. Its district seat is located at the village of Loa Bakung.

The district was formed on 11 June 1996 from the western parts of Samarinda Ulu, and it initially consisted of 5 villages. Two of them, Loa Bakung and Loa Buah, were originally part of Loa Janan, Kutai Regency, until being transferred to Samarinda on 21 October 1987.

== Governance ==
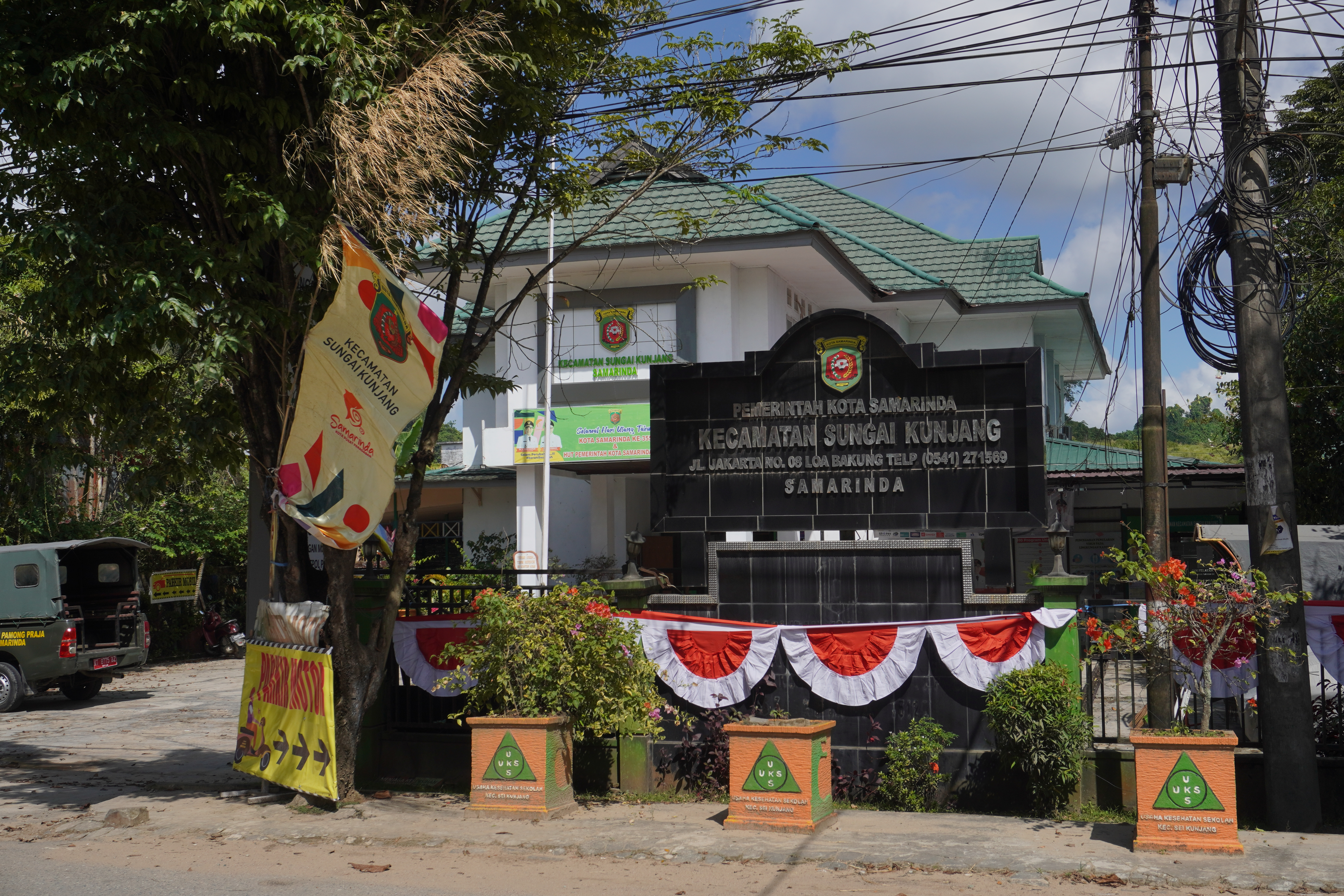
District head office at Loa Bakung, Sungai Kunjang.

=== Villages ===
Sungai Kunjang is divided into the following 7 villages (kelurahan):

| Regional code (Kode wilayah) | Name | Area (km^{2}) | Population (2023) | RT (rukun tetangga) |
|---|---|---|---|---|
| 64.72.06.1001 | Loa Bakung | 16.59 | 32,266 | 83 |
| 64.72.06.1002 | Loa Buah | 16.90 | 8,558 | 20 |
| 64.72.06.1003 | Karang Asam Ulu | 2.25 | 16,907 | 38 |
| 64.72.06.1004 | Lok Bahu | 3.42 | 35,124 | 51 |
| 64.72.06.1005 | Teluk Lerong Ulu | 1.20 | 14,300 | 42 |
| 64.72.06.1006 | Karang Asam Ilir | 1.29 | 15,239 | 35 |
| 64.72.06.1007 | Karang Anyar | 1.39 | 16,926 | 38 |
| | Totals | 43.04 | 139,320 | 307 |
