= 2016 Alfa Indonesia DHC-4 crash =

Air crash in Papua, Indonesia

Alfa Indonesia DHC-4 crash
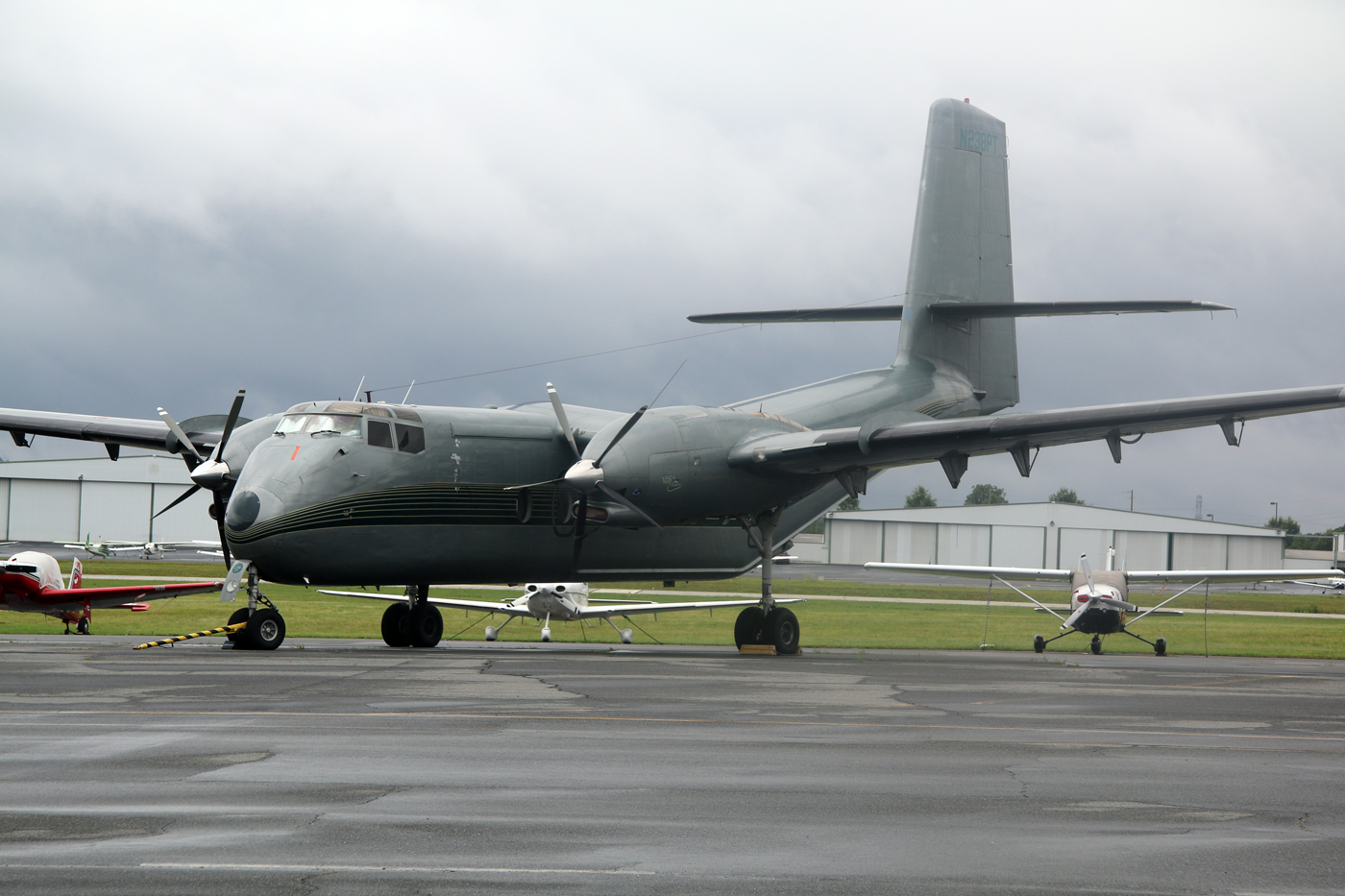
- A DHC-4T Turbo Caribou similar to the aircraft involved

Accident
- Date: 31 October 2016
- Summary: It is suspected that there was a navigation error and it was flying too low due to bad weather.
- Site: Near Jila, Papua, Indonesia; 4°7′46″S 137°38′11″E

Aircraft
- Aircraft type: DHC-4T Turbo Caribou
- Operator: Alfa Indonesia
- Registration: PK-SWW
- Flight origin: Mozes Kilangin Airport, Timika, Indonesia
- Destination: Ilaga Airport, Ilaga, Indonesia
- Occupants: 4
- Crew: 4
- Fatalities: 4
- Survivors: 0

On 31 October 2016, a modified DHC-4 Caribou transport aircraft operated by Alfa Indonesia crashed in the Papuan jungle while en route to Ilaga Airport in Ilaga, Indonesia. The flight was operated by Alfa Indonesia as a chartered cargo flight with four people on board. There were no survivors among the four crew members on board.

== Background ==
Infrastructure is an ongoing issue in Eastern Indonesia. For the past few years, the Indonesian Government had concentrated its development on the island of Java and Sumatra, causing a disparity in infrastructure on the east of Indonesia. After Joko Widodo was elected as president, the government then started to spread infrastructure development around Eastern Indonesia. Under the same program, airport development and the frequency of essential flights were increased in less developed areas in Papua.

In September 2016, to decrease the oil price in Puncak Regency, the government brought a DHC-4 Caribou to the region.

== Aircraft ==
The aircraft involved in the crash was a PEN Turbo DHC-4T Turbo Caribou, a de Havilland Canada DHC-4 Caribou modified with Pratt & Whitney Canada PT6-67A turboprop engines. Built in 1971, it first flew in modified form in September 2014. In May 2016, the aircraft was delivered to Indonesia, and entered service in September. It was registered in Indonesia as PK-SWW. It was jointly owned by the Indonesian government and the Puncak Regency local government. The four crew on board were Indonesians.

== Disappearance ==
The Caribou took off from Timika at 07:57 a.m. local time with an estimated time of arrival at 08:22, carrying construction materials. At 08:23, the crew made their first radio contact with Ilaga Tower and reported their position, which was on Ilaga Pass, a valley near Ilaga. After reporting their estimated time of arrival at Ilaga, contact with the tower was suddenly lost at 08:27 a.m.

At 09:22 a.m., the crew of another aircraft reported to Ilaga that they had received a signal suspected to have come from the missing aircraft's emergency locator transmitter near Jila. A search and rescue team was quickly assembled by the National Search and Rescue Agency. Local authorities and residents also joined the search operation. However, heavy rain and limited visibility hampered the search and rescue operation and it was postponed. The search and rescue team, consisting of personnel from the Indonesian Air Force, the National Search and Rescue Agency, the Indonesian Army and the Indonesian National Police along with two helicopters, set up three main camps in response to the disappearance. Two fixed-wing aircraft were also deployed.

== Discovery of the wreckage ==
On 1 November 2016, the smoldering wreckage was found on the side of Ilaga Pass, at an elevation of 12,800 feet (3,900 m) in Jila District, approximately 9 nautical miles (17 km; 10 mi) from Jila and 6 nautical miles (11 km; 6.9 mi) from Ilaga. The aircraft was totally burnt out with wreckage strewn over the valley. The impact was so severe that there was no chance of finding any survivors. After the discovery, two helicopters were deployed to evacuate the bodies from the crash site and bring them to Timika, where a procession was held to honour the victims.

== Investigation ==
The National Transportation Safety Committee was ordered to investigate the crash and had received the debris of the aircraft. Both the Flight Data Recorder and Cockpit Voice Recorder were still missing. On 6 November, both the FDR and the CVR were found and were recovered by search team. Both later were sent to the NTSC facility in Jakarta for further analysis.

The interim report included a recommendation to Perkumpulan Penerbangan Alfa Indonesia "to comply the DGCA Safety Circular number SE.24 of 2016".

== See also ==
- Aviastar Flight 7503
- Trigana Air Service Flight 267
