= Samarinda Ulu =

District of Samarinda, East Kalimantan

- District
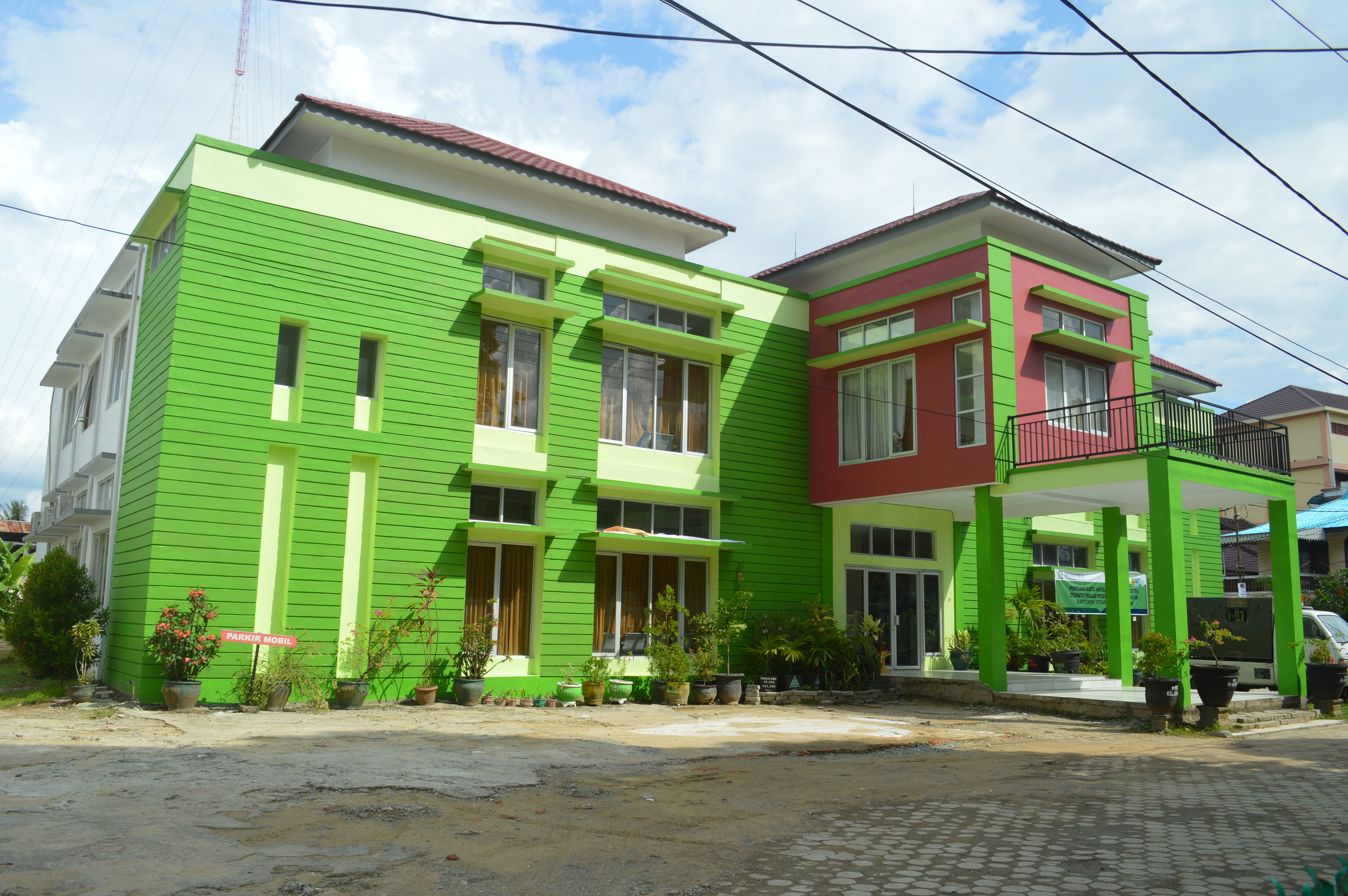
- Samarinda Ulu District Office, Samarinda
- Interactive map of Samarinda Ulu
- Location in Kalimantan and Indonesia Samarinda Ulu (Indonesia)
- Coordinates: 0°29′5.280″S 117°7′39.216″E
- Country: Indonesia
- Province: East Kalimantan
- Regency: Samarinda
- District seat: Air Putih

Government
  - District head (Camat): Sujono

Area
  - Total: 22.12 km^{2} (8.54 sq mi)

Population (2023)
  - Total: 133,331
  - Density: 6,028/km^{2} (15,610/sq mi)
- Time zone: UTC+8 (ICT)
- Postal code: 75122 - 75128
- Regional code: 64.72.03
- Villages: 8

Samarinda Ulu (Indonesian pronunciation: [samaˈrinda ˈulu], lit. 'upper Samarinda') is a district of the Samarinda, East Kalimantan, Indonesia. As of 2023, it was inhabited by 133,331 people, and currently has a total area of 22.12 km^{2}. Its district seat is located at the village of Air Putih.

On 11 June 1996, the district of Sungai Kunjang was separated from Samarinda Ulu.

== Governance ==
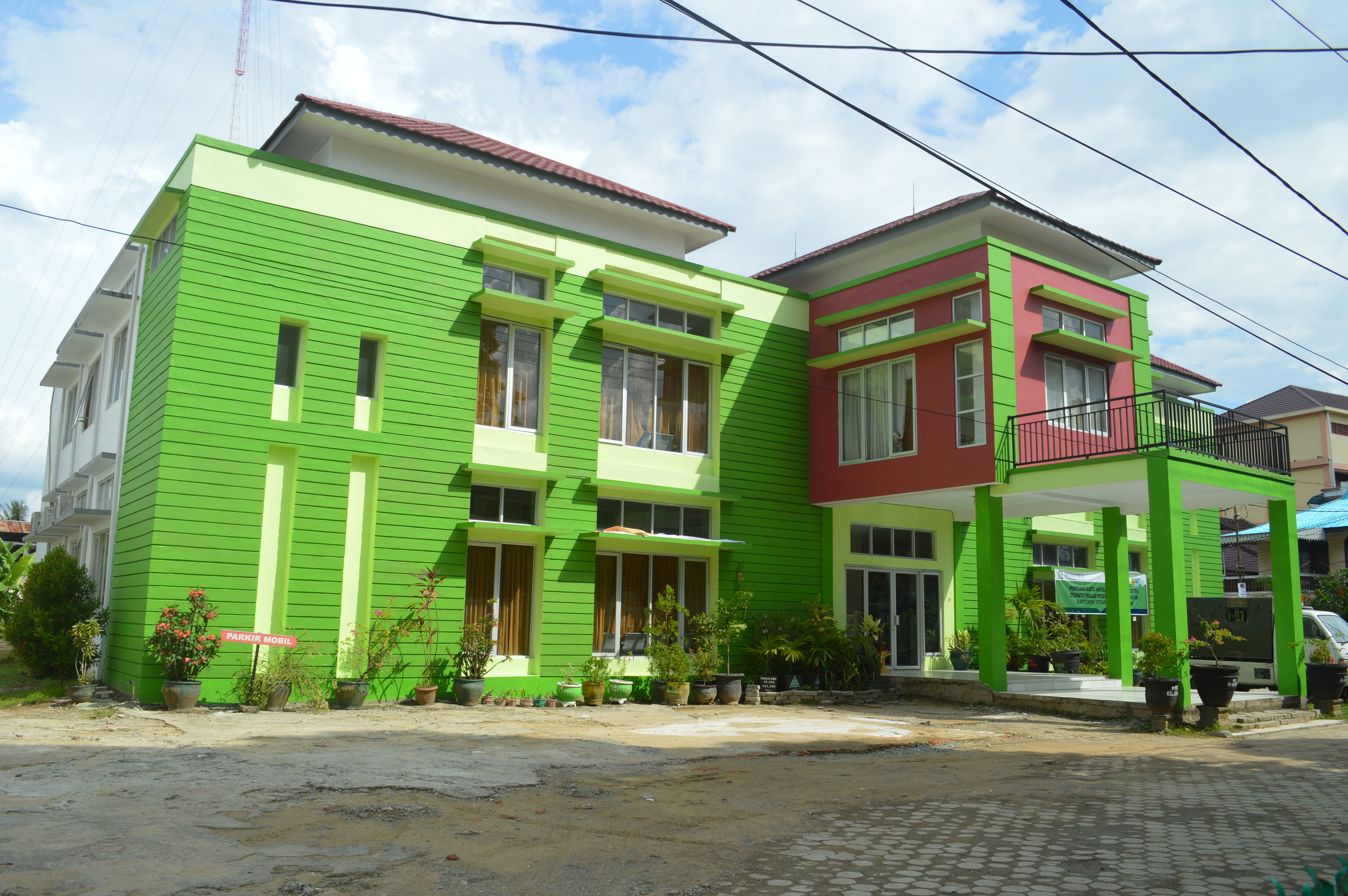
District head office at Air Putih, North Samarinda.

=== Villages ===
Samarinda Ulu is divided into the following 8 villages (kelurahan):

Regional code (Kode wilayah)	Name	Area (km^{2})	Population (2023)	RT (rukun tetangga)
64.72.03.1001	Teluk Lerong Ilir	0.69	13,178	30
64.72.03.1002	Jawa	7.68	11,443	40
64.72.03.1004	Air Putih	2.16	30,249	60
64.72.03.1005	Sidodadi	1.37	23,890	56
64.72.03.1006	Air Hitam	2.65	16,701	35
64.72.03.1007	Dadi Mulya	2.89	12,080	40
64.72.03.1008	Gunung Kelua	1.19	13,630	38
64.72.03.1009	Bukit Pinang	3.49	12,160	21
	Totals	22.12	133,331	320
