= Om Telolet Om =

Social media meme

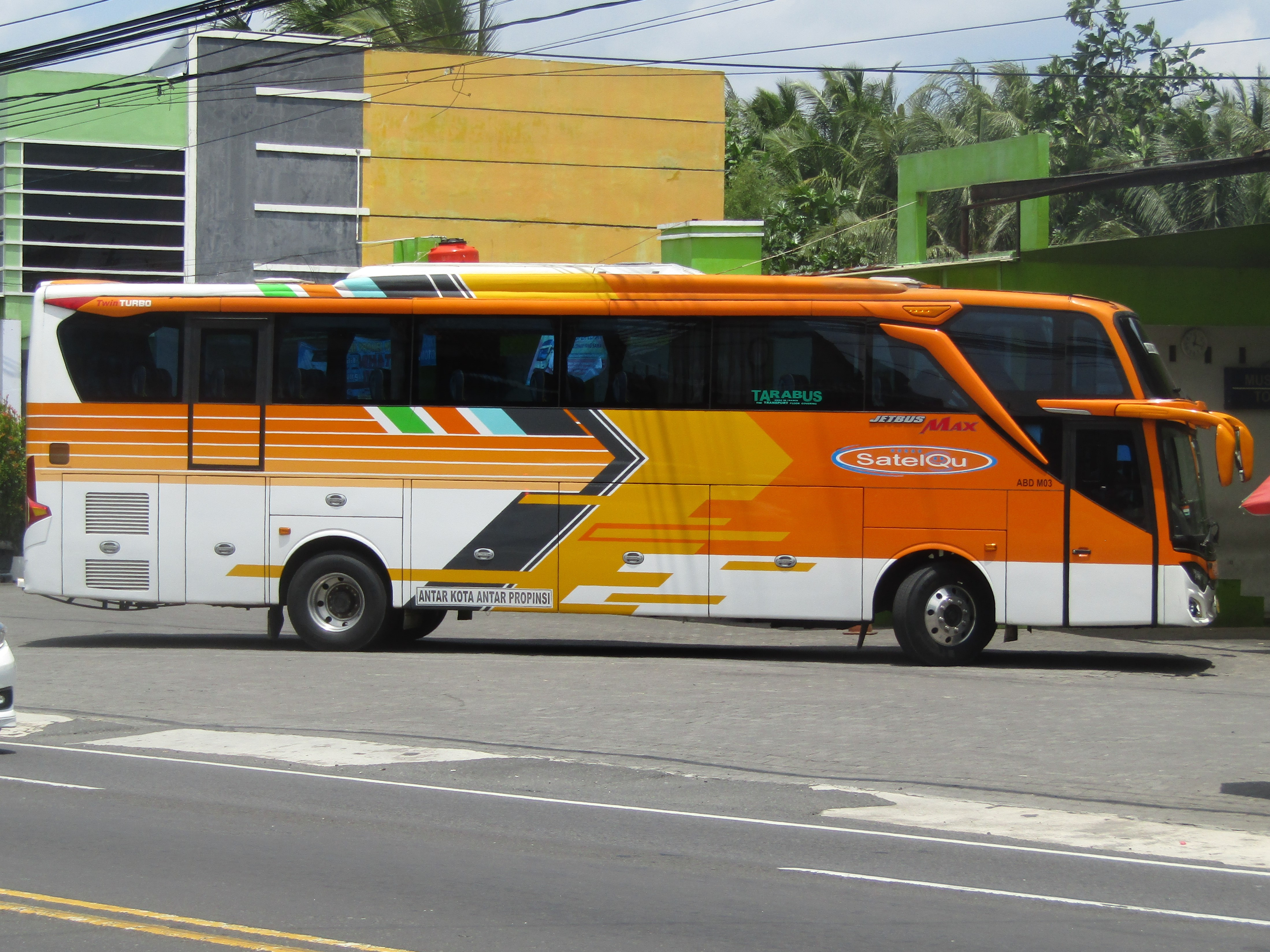
An Efisiensi bus (branded with SatelQu logo), which is considered as an inspiration for telolet horn sound

Om Telolet Om (also known as #OmTeloletOm) is a social media meme that depicts Indonesian youths' excitement when a bus driver honks a modified horn in a rhythmic manner as they pass by. This phenomenon gained popularity after a video showing a group of youths waiting roadside for a passing bus in Jepara, Central Java was uploaded to social media. In practice, a crowd would shout "Om Telolet Om" at passing buses, often while holding a piece of paper with the phrase written on it.

The word om is a term that originally means “uncle”, but it can be used in general to address older men akin to “sir”; telolet on the other hand is onomatopoeic describing the rhythmatic sound of horns found in most Indonesian bus models while some simply produce a simple “honk”. In short, the phrase "om, telolet, om" (roughly "Honk the horn!") signals bus and truck drivers to blare their horns mirroring the "trucker salute", an arm-pumping gesture for a similar purpose common in Canada, the U.S. and even Europe.

However, the type of horn used for the telolet is proscribed de jure in some countries such as Vietnam.

== Background ==
As Indonesian netizens spammed the Twitter and Instagram accounts of several DJs including DJ Snake, Marshmello, Firebeatz, Dillon Francis, Zedd, DJ Soda, and Cash Cash with the hashtag "OmTeloletOm", the phrase began to gain popularity. By the end of December 2016, it had become a trending topic internationally. The spam effort worked and international DJs started to create musical arrangements using modified bus honking, youths shouting "Om Telolet Om" and their laughter. The DJs also played these arrangements in their concerts including Life in Color, a paint and music concert in Miami which announced that their secret headliner would be "Om Tell et Om". The phrase also found its use in the video game Mobile Legends: Bang Bang as a voice line for the character Gatotkaca, while music videos have been created based on it, with the most notable one performed by iMeyMey.
