= 1945 in Indonesia =

- Centuries: 20th; 21st
- Decades: 1940s; 1950s; 1960s
- See also: History of Indonesia; Timeline of Indonesian history; List of years in Indonesia

Events in the year 1945 in Indonesia. The country had an estimated population of 68,517,300 people.

== Incumbents ==
- President: Sukarno (from 18 August)
- Vice President: Mohammad Hatta (from 18 August)
- Prime Minister: Sutan Sjahrir (from 14 November)
- Chief Justice: Kusumah Atmaja (from 18 August)

Sukarno

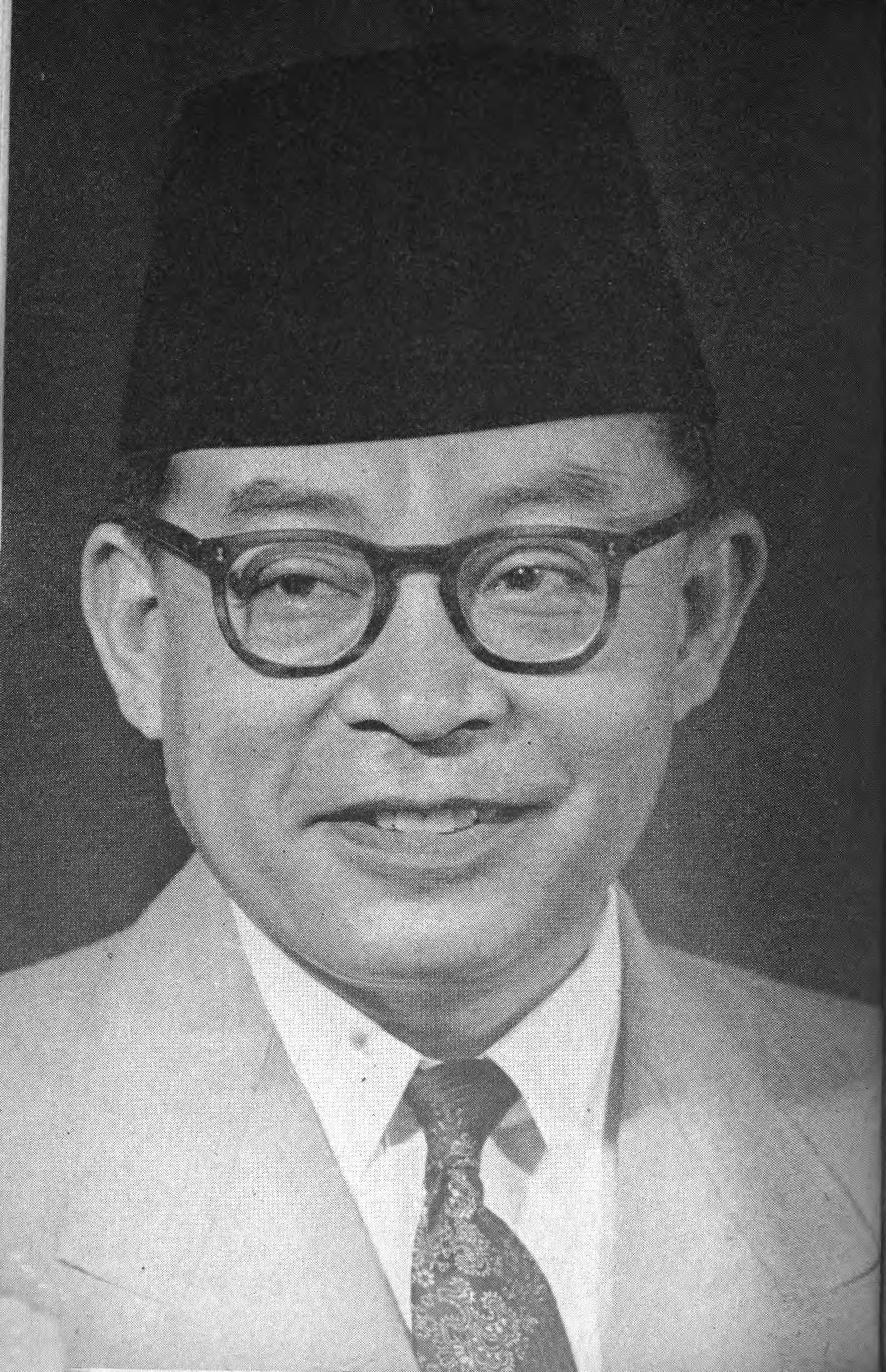
Mohammad
Hatta

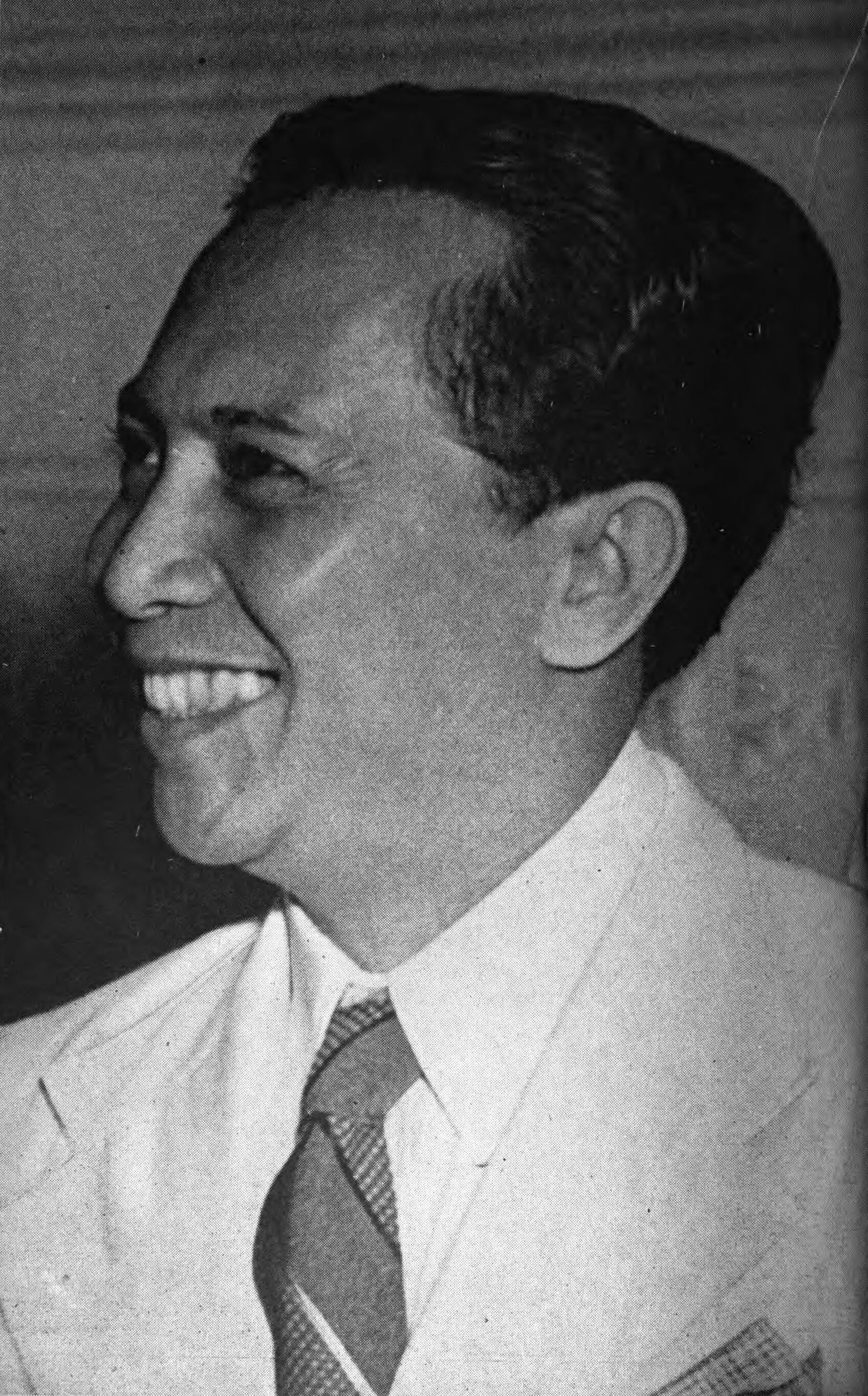
Sutan
Sjahrir

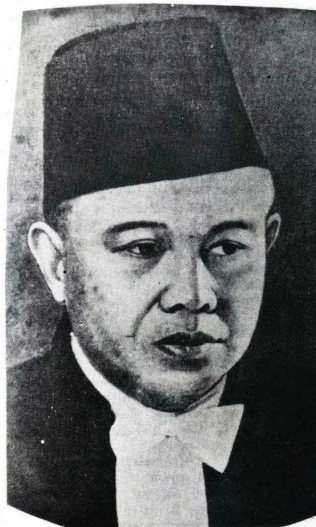
Kusumah
Atmaja

== Events ==
- 8 July – Establishment of the Islamic University of Indonesia, in Sleman, Yogyakarta
- 17 August –
  - Proclamation of Indonesian Independence
  - Start of the Indonesian National Revolution
- 22 August – Launch of Voice of Indonesia
- August – Start of Bersiap
- 2 September – Establishment of the Presidential Cabinet
- 7 September – Disestablishment of Asia Raja newspaper
- 11 September – Establishment of the Radio Republik Indonesia
- 17 September – Establishment of the Indonesian Red Cross Society
- 27 October – 20 November – Battle of Surabaya
- 3 November - 3 November 1945 declaration
- 11 November – VP Mohammad Hatta issued the Vice-Presidential Edict No.X
- 14 November –
  - Disestablishment of the Presidential Cabinet
  - Establishment of the office of Prime Minister of Indonesia
  - Establishment of the First Sjahrir Cabinet

== Births ==
- Ahmad Mushaddeq, founder of Milah Abraham
- 15 February - I Gede Ardhika, politician and Minister for Culture and Tourism (died 2021)
- 24 February - Sjahrir, economist (died 2008)
- 28 February - Luthfi Dahlan, retired police officer
- 2 March - Anwar Udjang, footballer (died 2014)
- 4 April - Gugum Gumbira, composer, orchestra leader, choreographer (died 2020)
- 5 May - Fabianus Tibo, alleged leader of Poso riots (died 2006)
- 7 May - A.M. Hendropriyono, retired Kopassus honorary general, first head of State Intelligence Agency
- 12 May - Achmad Sutjipto, admiral and Chief of Staff of the Indonesian Navy (died 2000)
- 27 June - Wisran Hadi, playwright and novelist (died 2011)
- 9 July - Ngatmin Nanto, military officer and politician
- 12 July - Remy Sylado, writer (died 2022)
- 14 August - Akbar Tandjung, politician and former Speaker of the House of Representatives
- 15 August - Hadi Utomo, politician
- 3 October - Aiyub Mohsin, diplomat and ambassador to Vietnam
- 12 December - Donald Pandiangan, archer (died 2008)
- 17 December - Agum Gumelar, politician and former general
- 20 December - Badrul Kamal, politician (died 2026)
- 28 December - Muhadi Suyono, regent of Ponorogo Regency (died 2012)

== Deaths ==
- 14 February - Supriyadi, national hero (born 1923)
- 2 September - Roekiah, singer and actress (born 1917)
- 30 October - Aubertin Walter Sothern Mallaby, British Indian Army officer (born 1899)
- 20 December - Oto Iskandar di Nata, politician (born 1897)
