= 1947 in Indonesia =

- Centuries: 18th; 19th; 20th; 21st
- Decades: 1940s; 1950s; 1960s
- See also: History of Indonesia; Timeline of Indonesian history; List of years in Indonesia

Events in the year 1947 in Indonesia. The country had an estimated population of 71,460,600 people.

== Incumbents ==
- President: Sukarno
- Vice President: Mohammad Hatta
- Prime Minister: Sutan Sjahrir (until 3 July), Amir Sjarifuddin (from 3 July)
- Chief Justice: Kusumah Atmaja

== Events ==
- Continuing Indonesian National Revolution
- February - Establishment of Sarbupri
- 8 March - Establishment of the Communist Party of Indonesia (Red)
- 7 June - Establishment of the Toraja Mamasa Church
- June - Disestablishment of the Third Sjahrir Cabinet
- 3 July - Establishment of the First Amir Sjarifuddin Cabinet
- 21 July to 4 August - Operation Product
- 29 July - Shoot down of Dakota VT-CLA
- 1 August - United Nations Security Council Resolution 27
- 25 August - United Nations Security Council Resolution 30
- 25 August - United Nations Security Council Resolution 31
- 26 August - United Nations Security Council Resolution 32
- 3 October - United Nations Security Council Resolution 35
- 1 November - United Nations Security Council Resolution 36
- 11 November - Disestablishment of the First Amir Sjarifuddin Cabinet
- 12 November - Establishment of the Second Amir Sjarifuddin Cabinet
- November - Establishment of the Sentral Organisasi Buruh Seluruh Indonesia
- 9 December - Rawagede massacre

== Births ==
- 23 January – Megawati Sukarnoputri, politician, President of Indonesia
