= 1949 in Indonesia =

- Centuries: 18th; 19th; 20th; 21st
- Decades: 1940s; 1950s; 1960s
- See also: History of Indonesia; Timeline of Indonesian history; List of years in Indonesia

Events in the year 1949 in Indonesia. The country had an estimated population of 74,530,300.

== Incumbents ==
- President: Sukarno
- Vice President: Mohammad Hatta
- Prime Minister: Mohammad Hatta, Susanto Tirtoprodjo (Acting)
- Chief Justice: Kusumah Atmaja

== Events ==
- Continuing Indonesian National Revolution
- 28 January - Adoption of the United Nations Security Council Resolution 67
- 7 May - Roem–Van Roijen Agreement
- 12 May - Establishment of the Apostolic Prefecture of Hollandia
- 1 July - Founding of the Jawa Pos newspaper
- 4 August - Disestablishment of the First Hatta Cabinet
- 4 August - The Second Hatta Cabinet takes office
- 23 August - 2 November - Dutch–Indonesian Round Table Conference
- August - Establishment of the Kolese Loyola high school, in Semarang
- 5 October - Adoption of the United Nations Security Council Resolution 76
- 15 October - Founding of the Universitas Nasional
- 14 December - Dissolution of the Second Hatta Cabinet
- 19 December - Founding of the Gadjah Mada University, in Yogyakarta
- 27 December - Treaty of The Hague
- 27 December - Establishment of the Netherlands-Indonesian Union
- 27 December - End of the Indonesian National Revolution with an Indonesian victory
- 27 December - The Susanto Cabinet takes office
