= 1946 in Indonesia =

- Centuries: 20th; 21st
- Decades: 1940s; 1950s; 1960s
- See also: History of Indonesia; Timeline of Indonesian history; List of years in Indonesia

Events in the year 1946 in Indonesia. The country had an estimated population of 69,973,500 people.

== Incumbents ==
- President: Sukarno
- Vice President: Mohammad Hatta
- Prime Minister: Sutan Sjahrir
- Chief Justice: Kusumah Atmaja

Sukarno

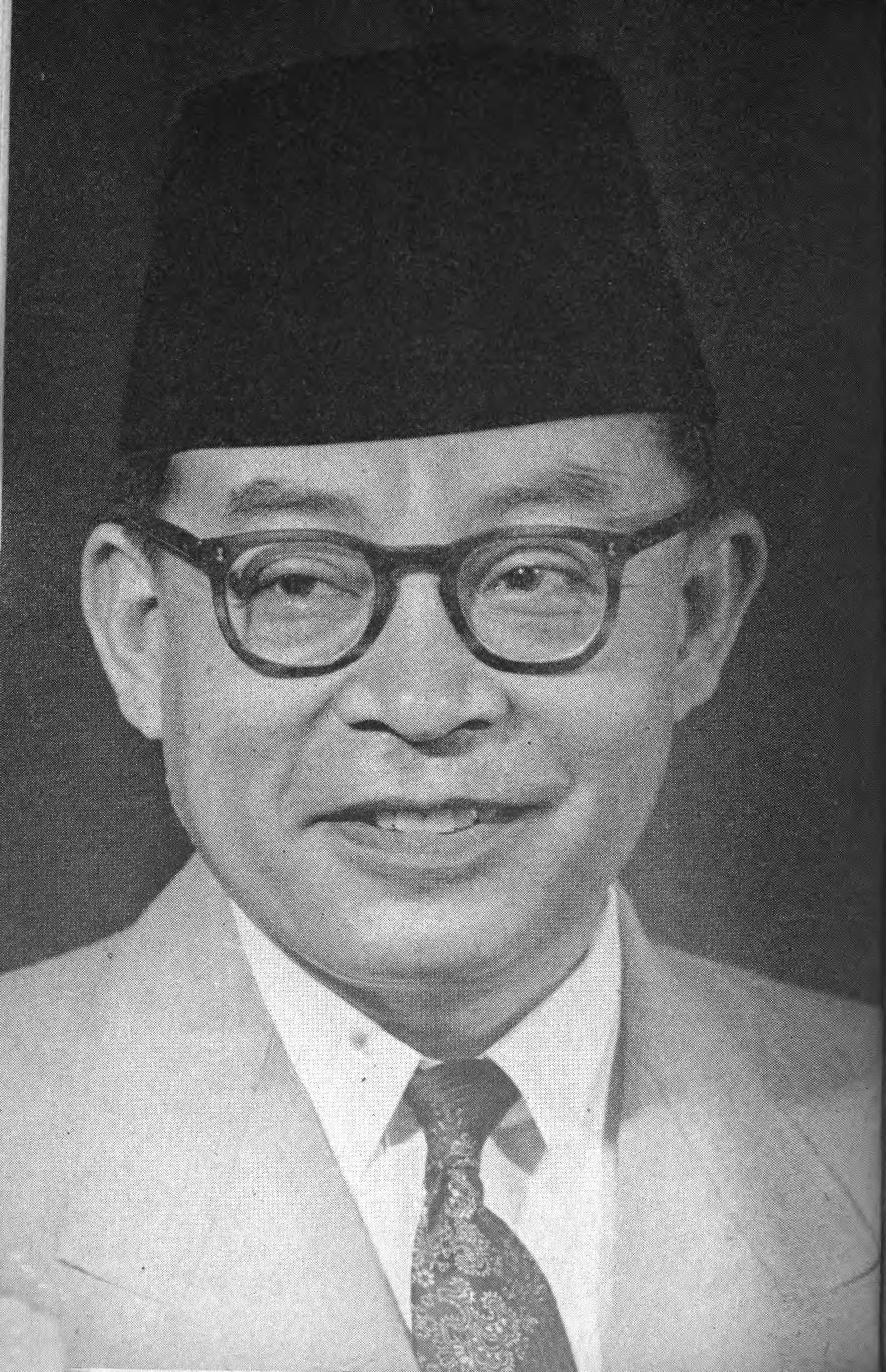
Mohammad
Hatta

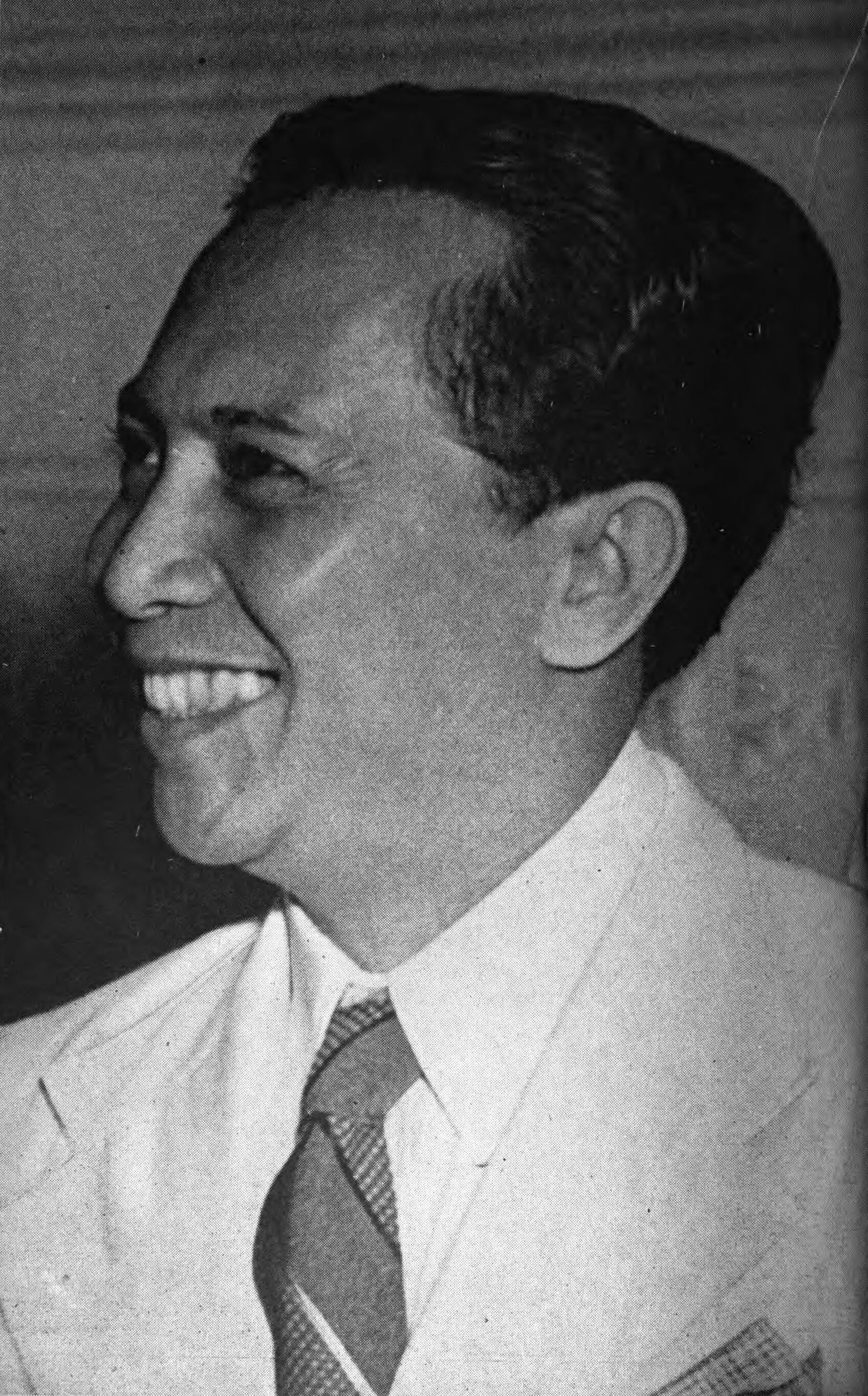
Sutan
Sjahrir

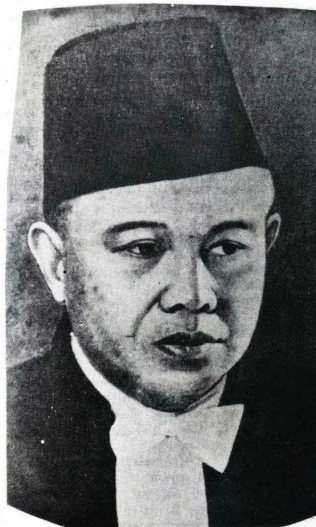
Kusumah
Atmaja

== Events ==
- Continuing Indonesian National Revolution
- February - Disestablishment of the First Sjahrir Cabinet
- 24 March - Bandung Sea of Fire
- March - Establishment of the Second Sjahrir Cabinet
- 27 June to 3 July - 3 July Affair
- 28 June - Disestablishment of the Second Sjahrir Cabinet
- 5 July - Establishment of the Bank Negara Indonesia
- July - Malino Conference
- October - Establishment of the Third Sjahrir Cabinet
- 15 November - Linggadjati Agreement
- December - End of Bersiap phase of the Indonesian National Revolution
- Establishment of the Indonesian Olympic Committee
- Establishment of the National Sports Committee of Indonesia

== Deaths ==
- 25 January - Daan Mogot, military officer (born 1928)
- 7 June - Siti Rukiah, poet and novelist (born 1927)
- 11 July - Muhammad Toha, national hero (born 1927)
