= 1948 in Indonesia =

- Centuries: 18th; 19th; 20th; 21st
- Decades: 1940s; 1950s; 1960s
- See also: History of Indonesia; Timeline of Indonesian history; List of years in Indonesia

Events in the year 1948 in Indonesia. The country had an estimated population of 72,979,300.

== Incumbents ==
- President: Sukarno
- Vice President: Mohammad Hatta
- Prime Minister: Amir Sjarifuddin (until 29 January), Mohammad Hatta (from 29 January)
- Chief Justice: Kusumah Atmaja

== Events ==
- Continuing Indonesian National Revolution
- 17 January - Ratification of the Renville Agreement
- 23 January - End of the Second Amir Sjarifuddin Cabinet
- 2 February - First Hatta Cabinet takes office
- 28 February - Adoption of United Nations Security Council Resolution 40 and United Nations Security Council Resolution 41 at the United Nations Security Council
- 29 July - Adoption of United Nations Security Council Resolution 55
- 16 August - Founding of Bali Post Media Group media conglomerate
- Madiun Affair
- 31 October - Establishment of the Protestant Church in West Indonesia
- 19–20 December - Operation Kraai
- 24 December - Adoption of United Nations Security Council Resolution 63
- 28 December - Adoption of United Nations Security Council Resolution 64 and United Nations Security Council Resolution 65
- Founding of Lippo Bank

== Births ==
- March 8 - Sinta Nuriyah, 4th First Lady of Indonesia, wife of Abdurrahman Wahid
- April 10 - Fauzi Bowo, politician, diplomat and former governor of Jakarta
- December 3 - Abdul Hamid, actor and puppeteer (died 2022)

== Sports ==
- Founding of Assyabaab Surabaya football club
