= Gandrung =

Indonesian traditional dance

Gandrung dance
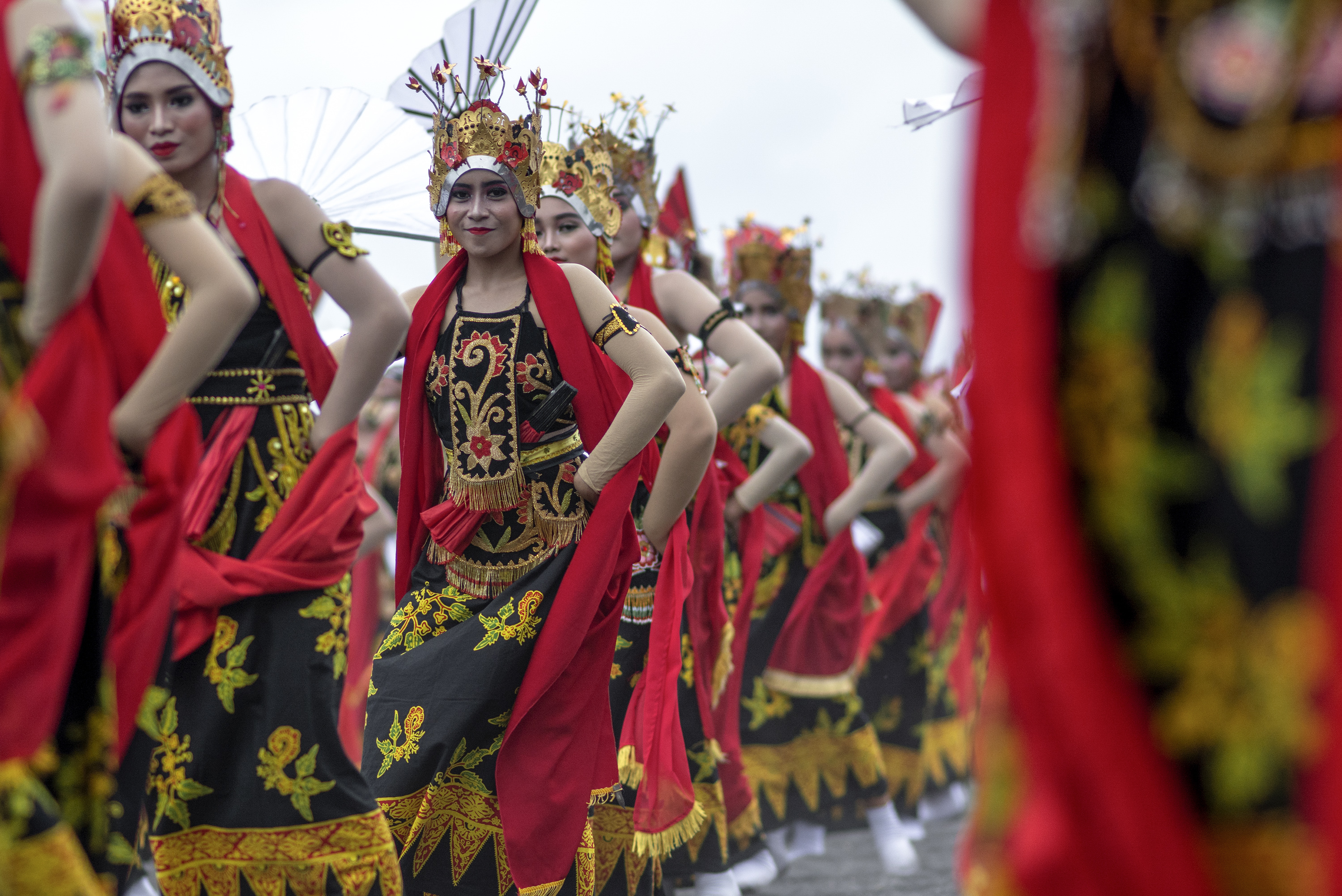
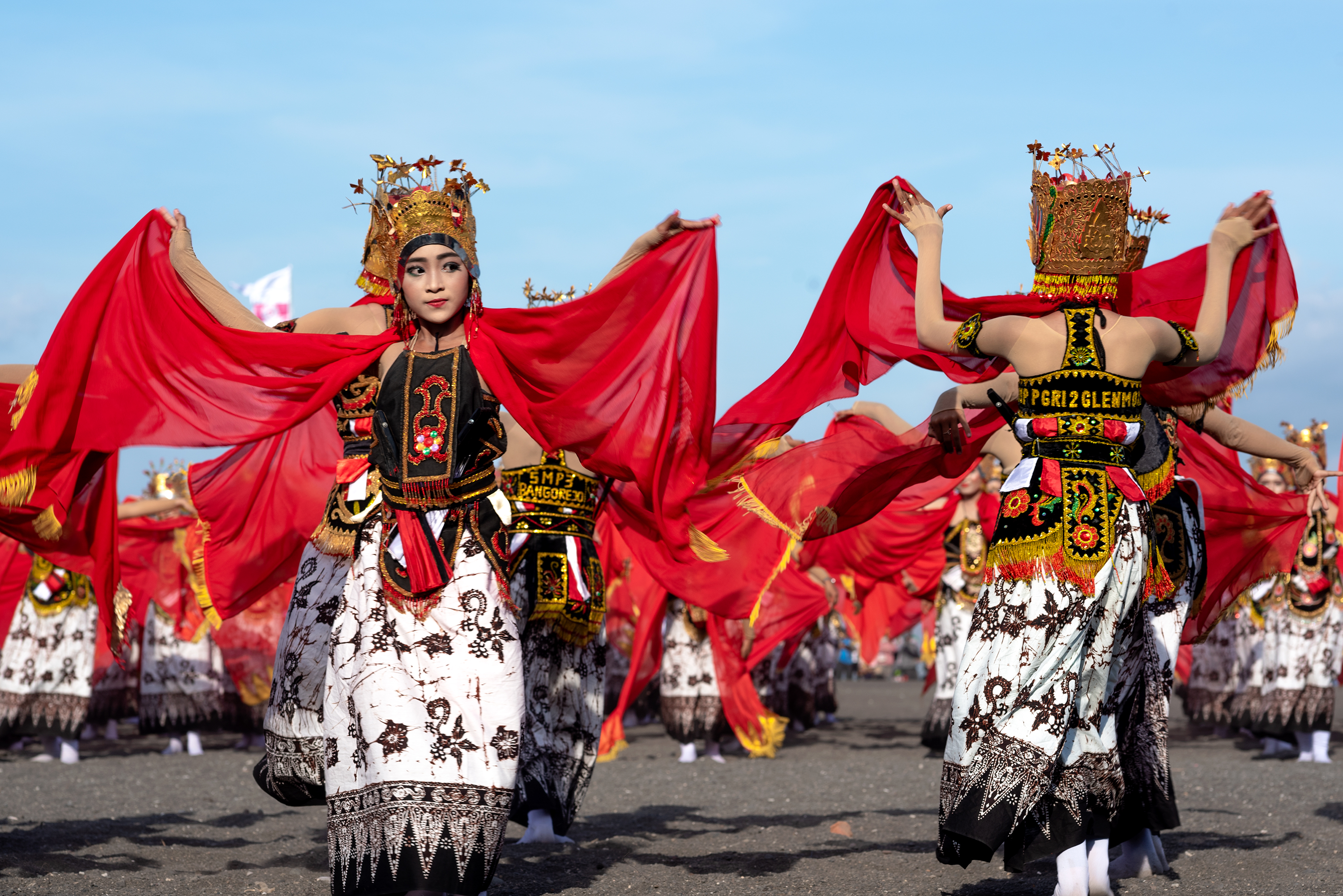
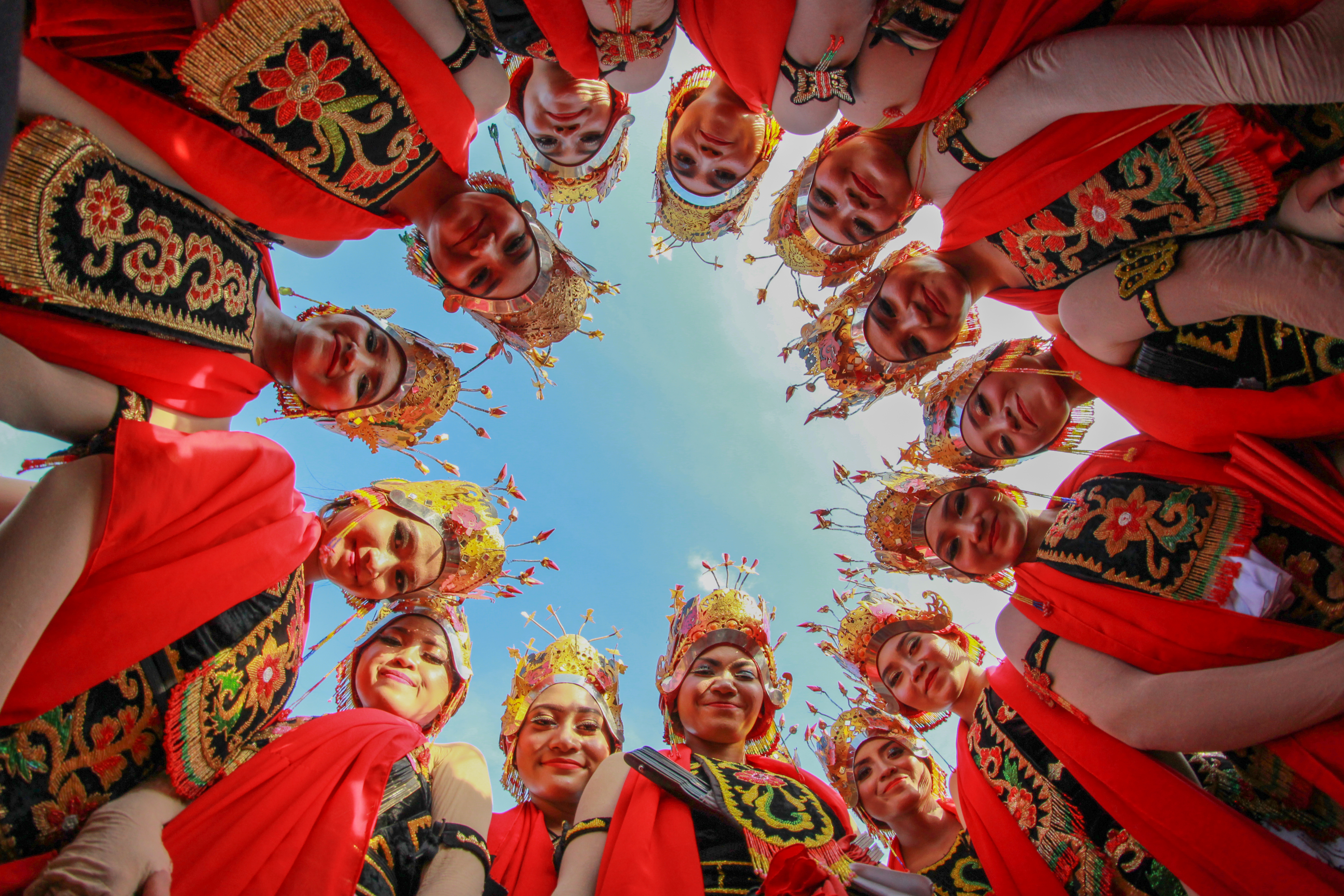
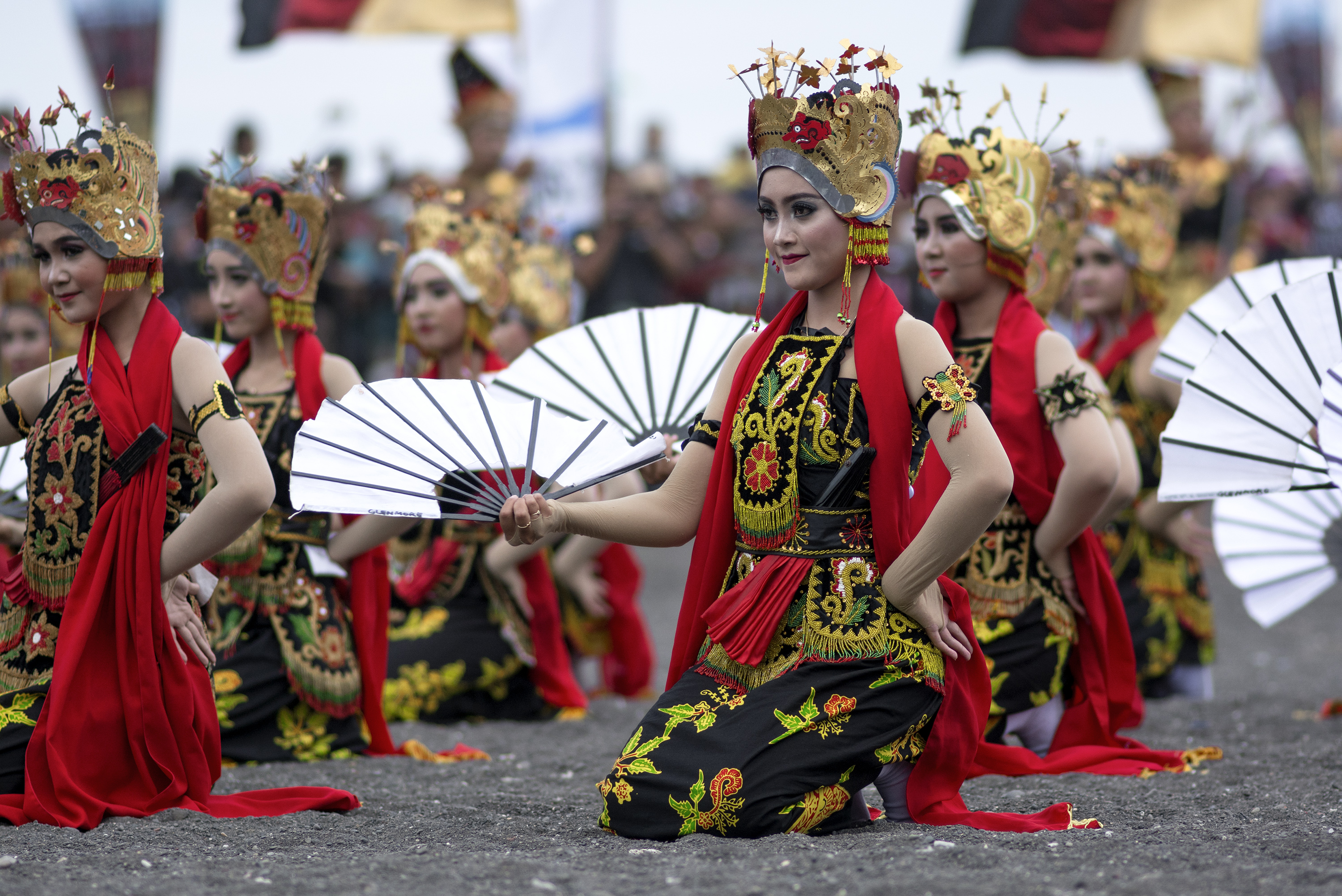
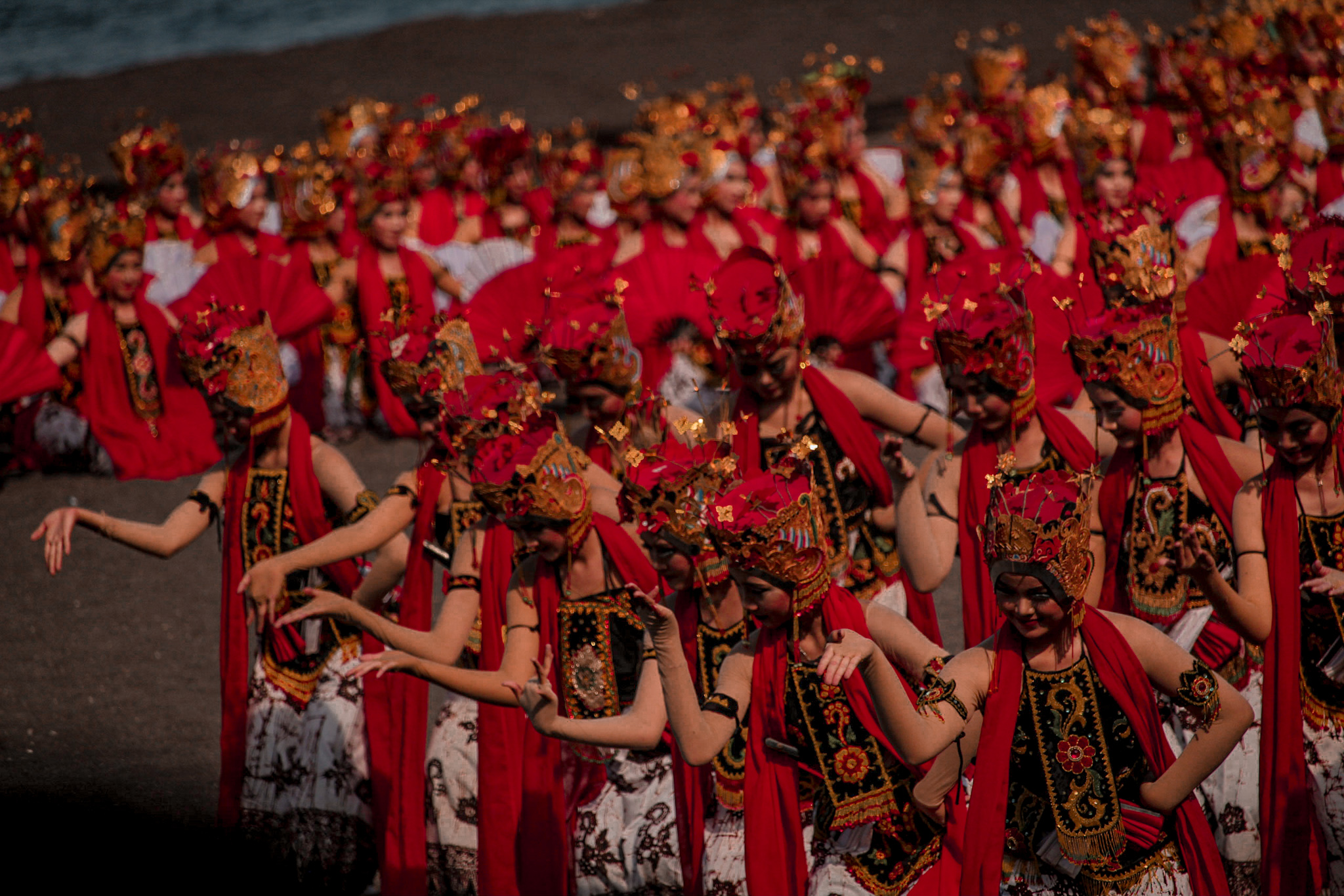
- Gandrung dance performance Gandrung dance performed in Banyuwangi
- Native name: ꦒꦤ꧀ꦝꦿꦸꦁ (Javanese); Gandrong (Osing) ᬕᬦ᭄ᬤ᭄ᬭᬸᬂ (Balinese); Tari Gandrung (Indonesian)
- Genre: Traditional dance
- Instrument(s): Bonang, Gambang, Gong, Kendhang, Violin
- Inventor: Osing
- Origin: Indonesia

Gandrung (Javanese: ꦒꦤ꧀ꦝꦿꦸꦁ; Osing: Gandrong; Balinese: ᬕᬦ᭄ᬤ᭄ᬭᬸᬂ; Petjo: Gandroeng) is a traditional dance from Indonesia. Gandrung has many variations and is popular in Bali, Lombok, and Eastern Java among the Balinese, Sasak, and Javanese (especially the Osing Javanese). The most popular variation is gandrung from the Banyuwangi region in the eastern peninsula of Java; thus, the city is often referred to as Kota Gandrung, or "the city of gandrung". Originally a ritual dance dedicated to the goddess of rice and fertility, Dewi Sri, it is currently performed as a social dance of courtship and love in communal and social events, or as a tourist attraction. The Gandrung Sewu Festival is held at Banyuwangi annually.

== Descriptions ==
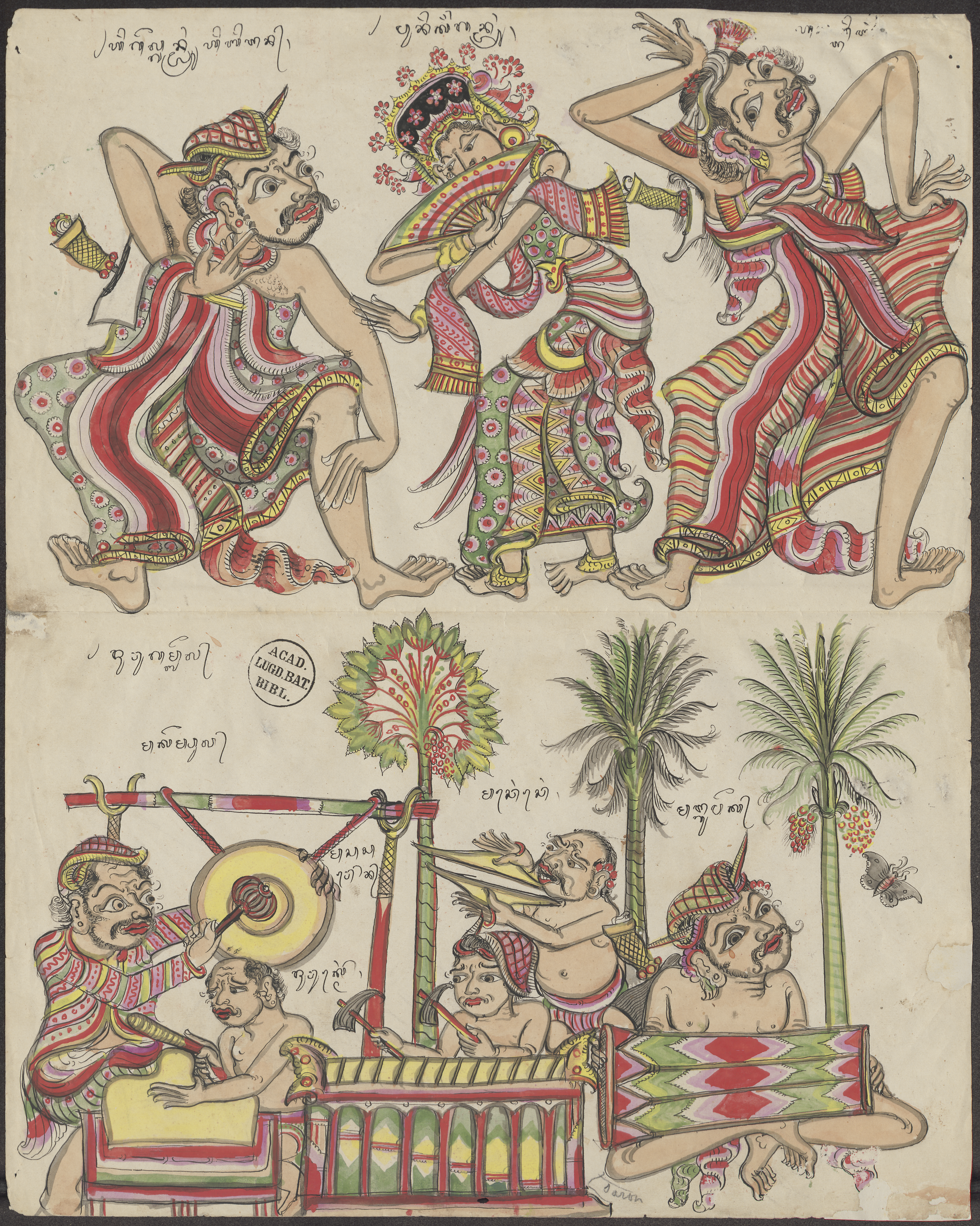
Gandrung dance performance in Balinese manuscripts. A collection of the University of Leiden, Netherlands

Gandrung derives its name from the Javanese word for "love". It is theorized that the dance originated as a ritual dance to express the people's affection for the rice goddess Dewi Sri, with trance and as a kind of fertility dance. However, it has now lost its ritual connotations, especially among the Muslim Javanese and the Sasak. The dance has evolved into a social dance describing a girl looking for love companions. The dance has thus been de-ritualized and has mostly lost its connections with the rice goddess.

Gandrung is usually performed in an all-night performance that begins sometime around 9 p.m. and ends just before dawn. It is also commonly performed as a tourist attraction, for example in Bali or in Grajagan Bay in Banyuwangi. It is also performed as a social dance at communal and social events such as circumcisions or weddings.

The gandrung, or main dancer, is usually an unmarried girl or a transvestite (or simply a boy playing the role of a female dancer). The dancer is dressed in traditional costume, with a fan, shawl, and ornamental headgear. Often there will be more than one gandrung dancer in the performance.

Gandrung usually starts with the dancer(s) at the side of the stage, surrounded by the gamelan ensemble. When the music starts, the dancer begins dancing with hip thrusts and moves to the center stage. When the gandrung spots an audience member she wishes to dance with, she throws her shawl to him to bring him to the stage. The dancer and the audience member will then dance together. If there is more than one gandrung dancer in the performance, each dancer will choose a different partner to dance with. The audience member who has danced with the gandrung usually gives a small amount of money as a token of appreciation.

Gandrung is now also performed as a dance of courtship and love between girls and boys in central and eastern Lombok. It is usually performed outdoors by the young men and women of the village, with everyone standing around in a circle.

Similar dances are known throughout the Indonesian archipelago, such as ronggeng or tayuban in East and Central Java, jaipongan in West Java and Banten, and joged in Jakarta.

== Music ==
The dance is performed to the tunes of a traditional ensemble similar to the gamelan, often composed of two violins, gendangs, bonang and gongs with gamelan xylophones (gambang). A singer is also present to sing the accompanying song for the gandrung performance. Villages in Banyuwangi, Bali, and Lombok sometimes have their own gandrung music ensemble. Variations in ensemble composition exist between the different areas where gandrung is performed. The music has been described as "vibrant and earthy" and has been recorded by several anthropologists.

Gandrung Movement
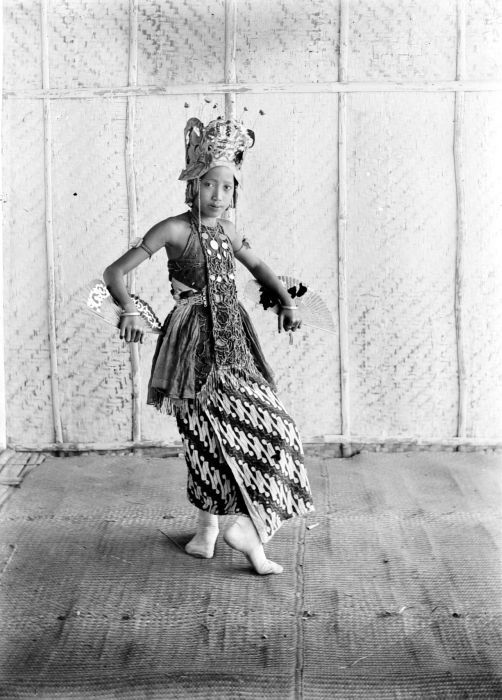
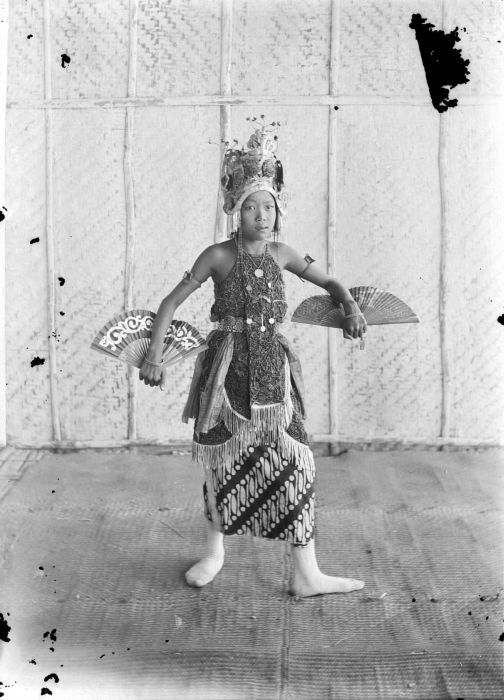
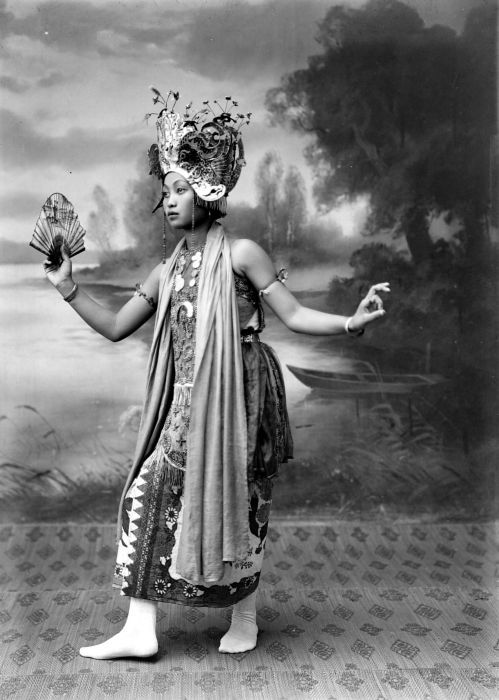
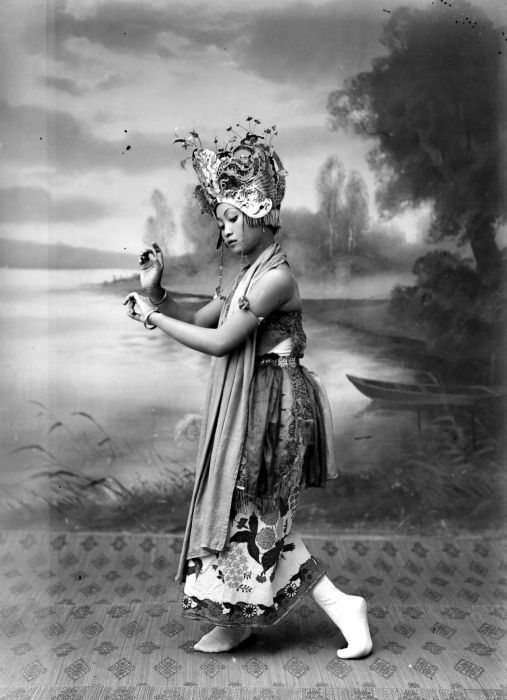
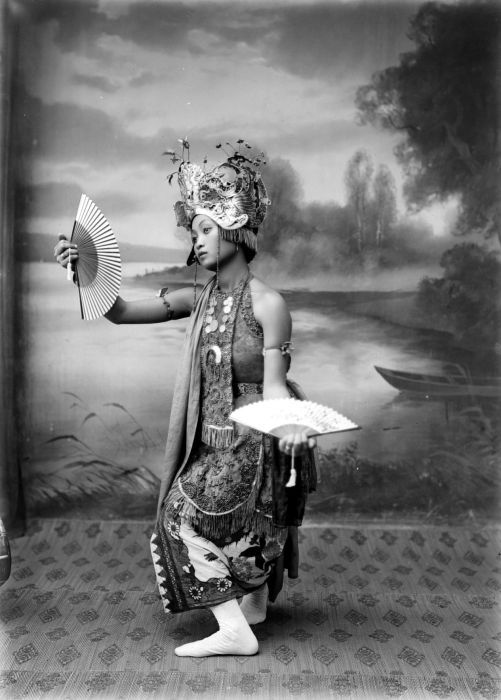
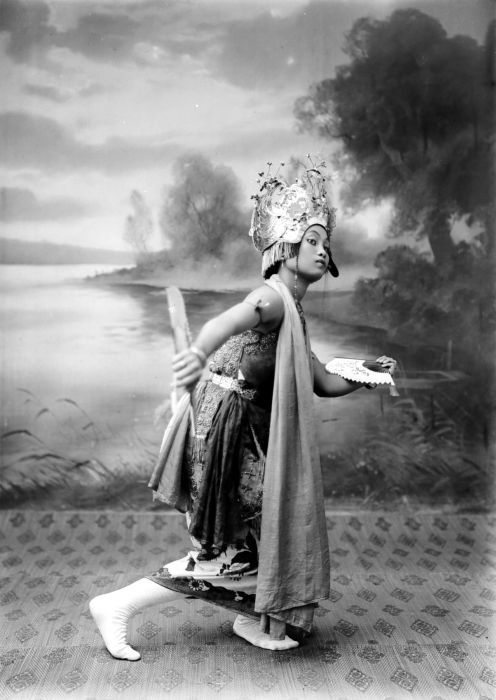
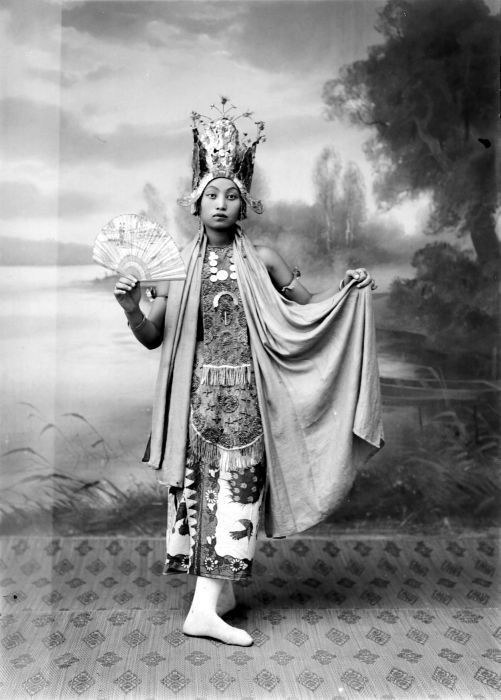

== Gallery ==
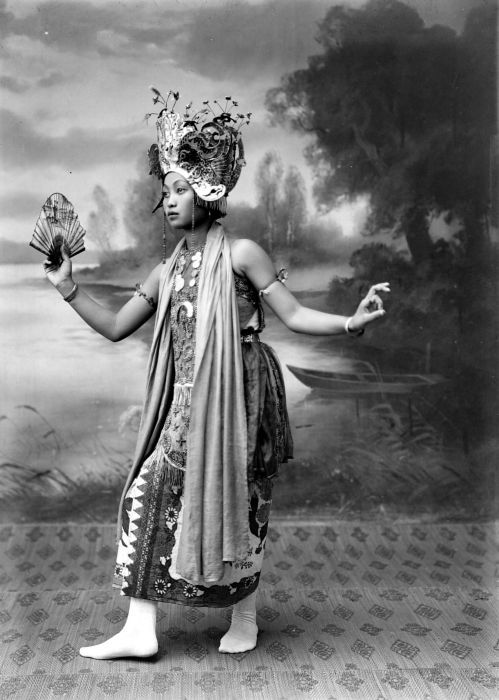
A gandrung dancer with traditional costume, a fan and a shawl

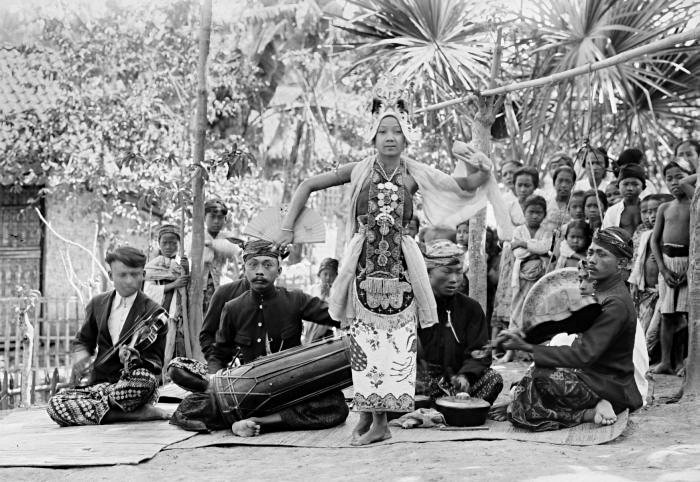
Musical ensemble that accompanies the gandrung

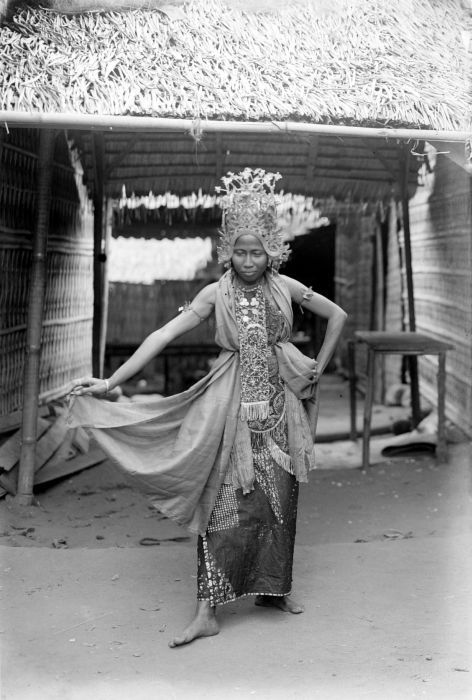
Gandrung dancer with a scarf as a dance accessory

== See also ==
- Javanese dance
- Pajoge
