= Jaipongan =

Indonesian traditional dance

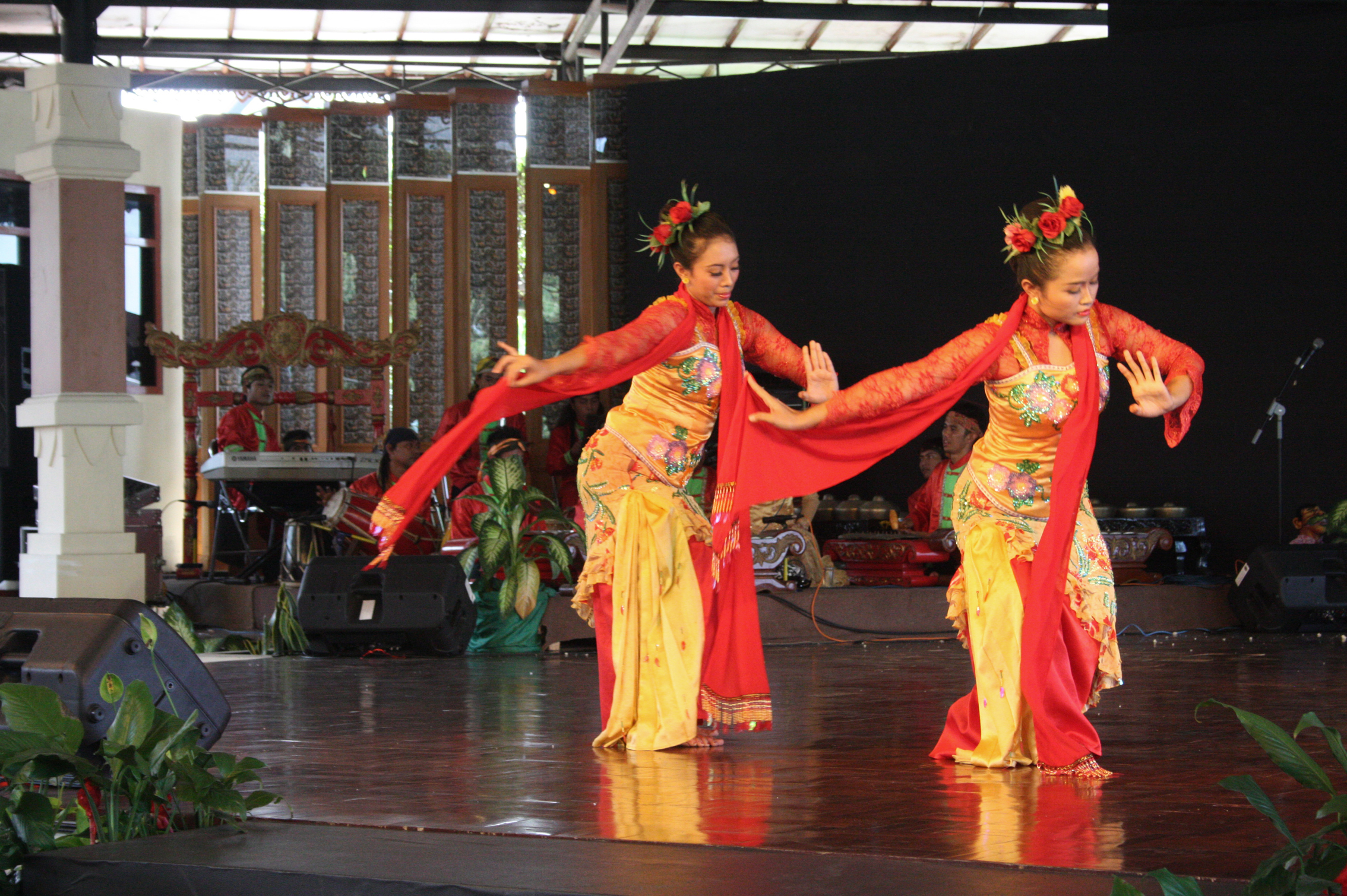
- Jaipongan Mojang Priangan dance performance
- Native name: ᮏᮄᮕᮧᮍᮔ᮪ (Sundanese); Tari Jaipong (Indonesian)
- Genre: Neo-Traditional
- Time signature: degung style of gamelan, Angklung
- Inventor: Sundanese (Gugum Gumbira)
- Origin: Indonesia

Jaipongan (Sundanese: ᮏᮄᮕᮧᮍᮔ᮪), also known as Jaipong, is a popular traditional dance of Sundanese people from Indonesia. The dance was created by Gugum Gumbira, based on the traditional Sundanese Ketuk Tilu music and pencak silat movements.

== Background ==
In 1961, Indonesian President Sukarno prohibited rock and roll and other Western genres of music and challenged Indonesian musicians to revive the indigenous arts. The name jaipongan came from people mimicking the sounds created by some of the drums in the ensemble. Audiences were often heard shouting jaipong after specific sections of rhythmic music were played. Jaipongan made its public debut in 1974 when Gugum Gumbira and his degung and dancers first performed in public.

The most widely accessible album of Jaipongan outside of Indonesia is Tonggeret by singer Idjah Hadidjah and Gugum Gumbira's Jugala orchestra, released in 1987, and re-released as West Java: Sundanese Jaipong and other Popular Music by Nonesuch/Elektra Records.

== Gugum Gumbira ==
Gugum Gumbira is a Sundanese composer, orchestra leader, choreographer, and entrepreneur from Bandung, Indonesia. After 1961, when Indonesian President Sukarno banned all forms of Western music and challenged his people to revive their cultural music, Gugum Gumbira made this task his own. To do this, he spent twelve years studying rural, festival dance music and the result was jaipongan. He also created his recording studio in Indonesia, called Jugala.

Gugum Gumbira was born in 1945 in Bandung, Indonesia. He attended college in Bandung where he majored in social and political UNPAD. Once he left college, he took up a position at the Ministry of Finance and later moved to Government Vehicles. He also lectured at the Academy of Finance until 1988.

He currently owns a recording studio called Jugala where he conducts his orchestra also called Jugala and a dance troupe that shares the same name. They travel around the world to perform. As the choreographer for Jugala, he met his wife, Euis Komariah, who was the singer for the orchestra and a dancer in the troupe.

== Musical origins ==
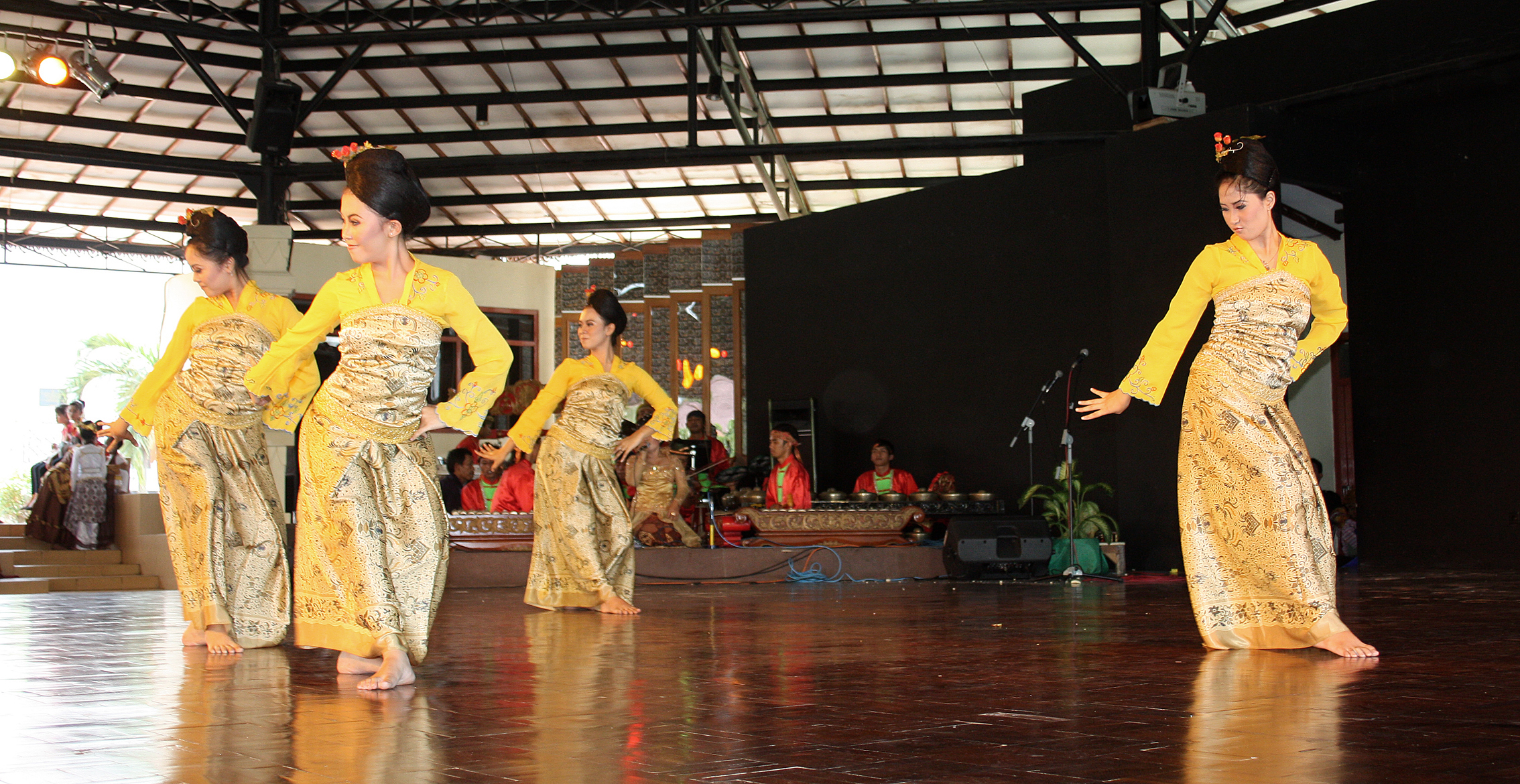
Jaipongan dance performance accompanied by Sundanese degung mixed with modern instruments.

Jaipongan, also known as jaipong, is a musical performance genre of the Sundanese people in the Sundanese language of West Java, Indonesia. Jaipongan includes revived indigenous arts, like gamelan, but it also does not ignore Western music completely despite the ban on rock and roll. It uses the sensuality found in traditional village music and dance, ketuk tilu. However, many believe it is something purely Indonesian or Sundanese in origin and style. It is developed predominately from rural folk forms and traditions as a purely indigenous form. The rise of cassettes and films has led to the popularity of the musical form of jaipongan. It has spread from its home in West Java's Sunda to greater Java and throughout Indonesia. It can be seen as many regional varieties of gong-chime performance found throughout much of Indonesia. Ketuk tilu is its biggest influence, as a traditional Sundanese musical entertainment form.

Gong-chime performance is characterized by such features as the use of an ensemble dominated by idiophones, metallophones, and knobbed gongs. It is a stratified polyphony, with lower-pitch instruments playing parts of lesser density and all parts are structured monotonically around time cycles This can be found in traditional Indonesian gamelan. There is an improvisation on certain instruments. The modes used are grouped into two broad types: slendro and pelog.

Ronggeng probably has existed in Java since ancient times, the bas reliefs in the Karmawibhanga section on Borobudur display the scene of a travelling entertainment troupe with musicians and female dancers.

The cassette industry and its boom in Indonesia helped popularize jaipongan greatly and promoted regional styles rather than hurt them.

The song repertoire of jaipongan is varied, and that is why it is better understood as an intertwined performance style of music and dance. Many songs are associated with ketuk tilu or other wide-reaching regional varieties, not traditional gamelan. It consists of songs of more recent origin often composed for jaipongan. Song topics vary, encompassing amatory, moralistic, bawdy, topical and spiritual subjects, often emphasizing grassroots culture.

== Instrumentation and choreography ==
Jaipongan is "a more slick and expanded version of ketuk tilu".

Jaipongan takes much of its instrumentation from the West Javan ketuk tilu ensembles. The ketuk tilu group is composed of pot-gongs. Besides the core three main kettle gongs (ketuk means to knock (or knocking sound), but in this case, refers to the three gongs; while tilu means three), the instruments include a rebab, a small upright bowed instrument, also known as a spike fiddle, other small gongs — a hanging gong and two iron plates, and two or three barrel drums. The traditional singer is female or a sinden, but also dances and invites men to dance with her sensually, so it is assumed she is a prostitute or ronggeng. Today a few ensembles hire male singers.

The idiophonic accompaniment of jaipongan may also include a few saron or a gegung (an L-shaped row of gong chimes), and often a gambang (xylophone). Otherwise, instruments are the same as in ketuk tilu, plus a drum kit, bongo drums, electric guitars, classic guitars and keyboards.

== Social implications ==
With the ban, Sukarno urged the public to “return to and revive the musical traditions of the past”. Gugum Gumbira heard this and decided to create a genre of music that would revive the musical interests of the past and add sexual undertones and a sense of elegance to bring it into the future. In addition to being a musical reincarnation, jaipongan also reincarnated martial arts and traditional dance. It became so popular that the government decided that it needed to be taught to people of all generations.

When jaipongan was first introduced in 1974, there was a lack of acceptable music in the area of West Java—Sunda more specifically. It gained popularity instantly because it was a completely non-western form of music that the government accepted and promoted. It had all of the values of traditional Sundanese music to entice the older generations, yet had enough energy, vibrancy, and sexuality to entice the younger generations. Jaipongan was also based on the life of the lower class and elevated their stories and struggles. It allowed the people to see themselves in the music and feel as if they were a part of their culture. Once it became popular, many other musicians began recreating it.

When situations in Sunda became more political, the music shifted and took on themes of moral, political, social, and spiritual awareness. Once the shift occurred, the government tried its best to end jaipongan. Due to its popularity with the people, it was able to maintain its craze and even outlasted the ban on Western music.

The sexual nature of the songs was taken from the idea of prostitution and was then elevated to make it a more elegant, civilized part of art. This broke gender barriers because it changed how men and women interacted. Never before had men and women danced or interacted together in promiscuous sexually explicit or suggestive ways in performance in Indonesia. Even though jaipongan was created to stay away from musical themes of sex, love, drugs, and rock and roll, it incorporated some of these themes in small increments. When the government discovered the sexual nature of the songs and dances, they looked to curb the popularity of jaipongan, but it had already become the music of the people and their efforts were thwarted.

Jaipongan was a way for the Sundanese people to take back their culture from Western ideas and rid themselves of the colonial Dutch influences. Jaipongan elevated the idea of village music or the music of the people. It focused on love, money, and agriculture, and as the world became filled with more turmoil, it became a vehicle for moral, political spiritual, and social awareness.

Jaipongan became so popular that in 1976, two years after its creation, it was recorded on cassettes on Gumbira's record label Jugala. With the cassette's release international popularity rose and helped to create a larger musical industry in Sunda and Indonesia at large. All of which was and still is used to help preserve the culture and history of West Java and the Sundanese people.

The rapid popularity of Jaipongan along with the boom in cassette tapes helped the genre to spread and become popular in Asia, Europe, and America during the 1980s. In addition, it created a tourism industry in Sunda. People from all over the world came to learn about and experience Jaipongan firsthand. Music and dance schools were created to preserve the art form and history of the Sundanese people. The government felt that Jaipongan was such a cultural staple that it needed to be taught to all citizens.

== Jaipong today ==
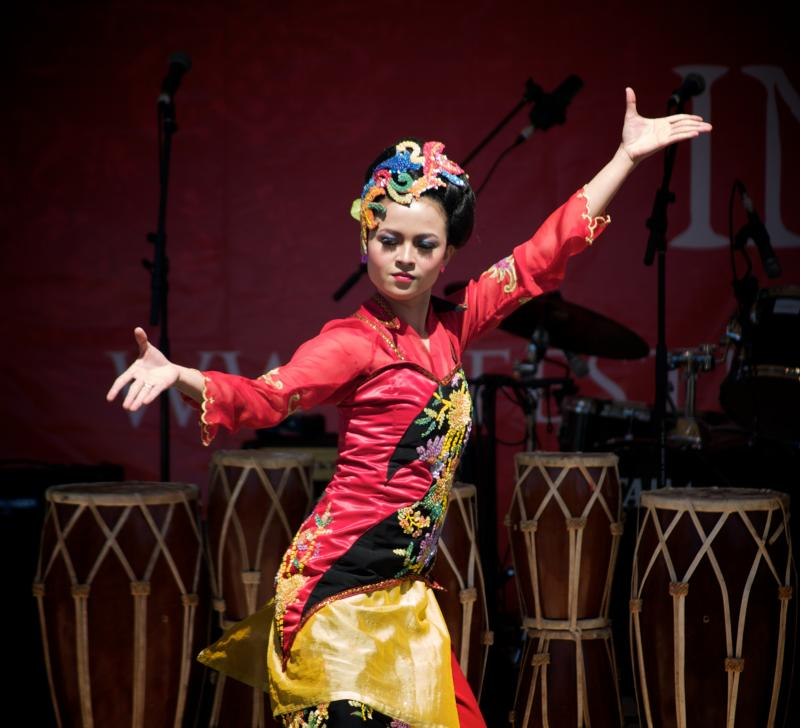
Jaipongan

In 2011, the international popularity of jaipongan has decreased, but in Asia, the genre is still extremely popular. It is most popular in the areas of Sunda, where it was created, as well as the surrounding villages and cities.

Although the genre is most popular in Asia, there are jaipongan dance troupes and musical ensembles in Europe in addition to the United States (like Harsanari of San Francisco, California) and throughout other parts of the world. Dutch-Indonesian choreographer Gerard Mosterd devised a modern dance choreography, "Ketuk Tilu" in 1998. Approved and inspired by Gugum Gumbira. Based on a classic recording with Euis Komariah and Jugala Orchestra.

In 2009, fundamentalist political proposals were submitted to blacklist jaipongan and several other "sensual" Indonesian dance forms. The ban attempt didn't succeed and jaipongan remains a very popular underground genre associated with erotic and rebellious power instead.

In 2015, jaipongan was noted as a modern classical genre of music, which is often utilized in other Asian music, and has multiple subgenres. There is still is a large market for jaipongan recordings.

== Film ==
There are many filmed performances online from students/audiences and dance documentaries from Java/Indonesia. Jaipongan songs have been taken and set to Mr. Bean, a character created by Rowan Atkinson, and other modern popular cultural references in YouTube videos.

Music videos and performances of Tonggeret by Idijah Hadijah as well as other famous artists can be seen on YouTube and also can be heard and referenced in use by Indian film songs. There is a full-length film called Mistri Ronggeng Jaipong from Indonesia, which was made in 1982 by Mardali Syareif.

There is also a Jean Hellwig film on popular dancing in West Java, from 1989, with accompanying book and jaipongan chapter called Sundanese Pop Culture Alive. A snippet can be seen in the reference section.

== Popular artists ==
- CBMW (Bandung Music Group)
- Jugala Orchestra
- Detty Kurnia
- Yayah Ratnasari & Karawang Group
- Idjah Hadidjah

== See also ==
- Gandrung, similar dance from Bali, Lombok and Eastern Java.
- Sundanese dance
- Dance in Indonesia
