= Gugum Gumbira =

Indonesian musician (1945-2020)

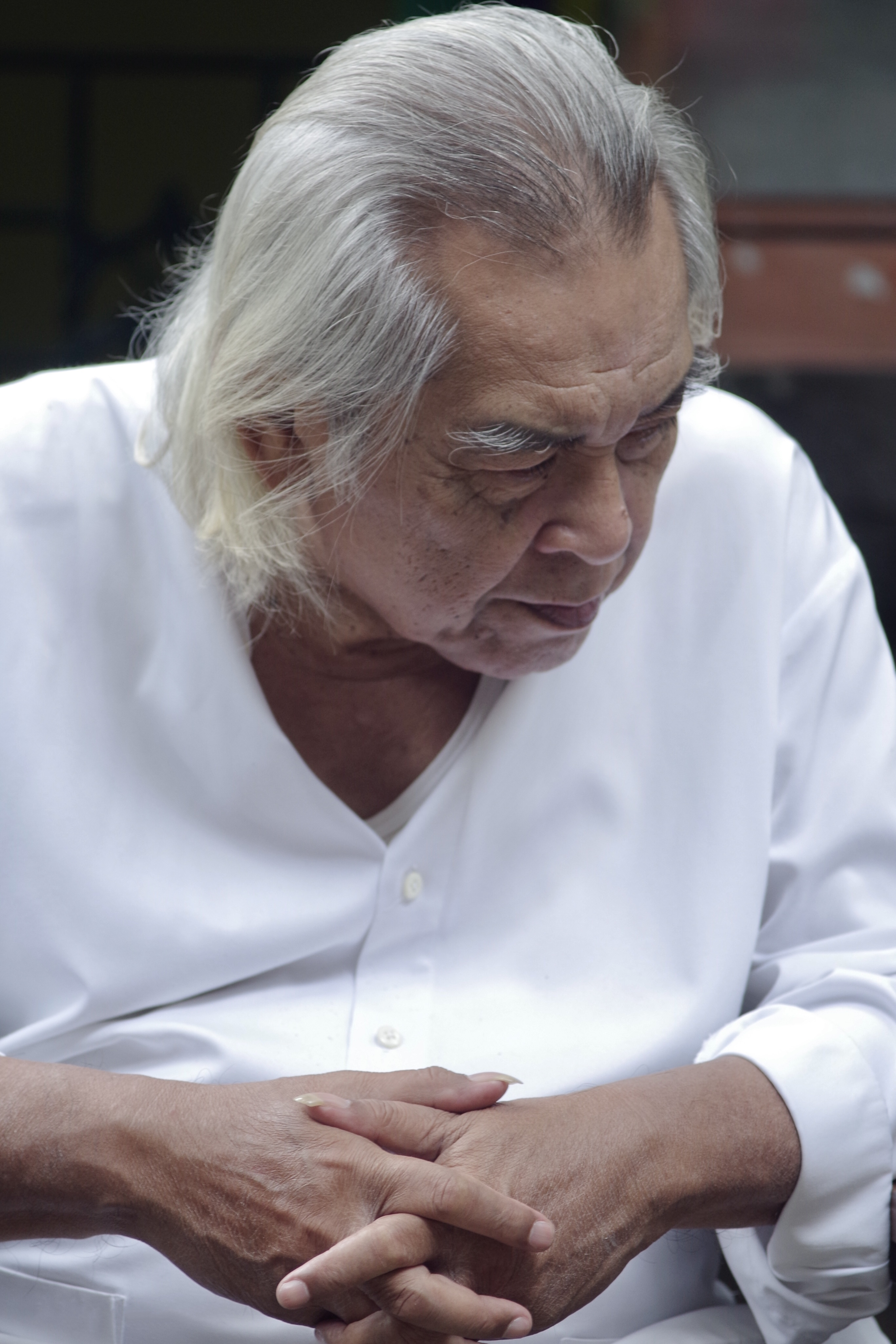
- Gugum Gumbira

Background information
- Born: Gugum Gumbira Tirasondjaja; April 4, 1945; Bandung, West Java, Indonesia
- Died: January 4, 2020 (aged 74) Bandung, West Java, Indonesia
- Genres: Gamelan, jaipongan
- Occupations: Composer, orchestra leader, choreographer

Gugum Gumbira Tirasondjaja (April 4, 1945 – January 4, 2020), often known just as Gugum Gumbira, was a Sundanese composer, orchestra leader, choreographer, and entrepreneur from Bandung, West Java, Indonesia.

== Jaipongan ==
In 1961, Indonesian President Sukarno prohibited rock and roll and other Western genres of music and challenged Indonesian musicians to revive the indigenous arts. Gugum Gumbira took up the challenge and studied rural dance and festival music for twelve years. Jaipongan, or Jaipong, was the most popular result of his study, derived from the updating of a village ritual music called ketuk tilu, with moves from Pencak Silat, the Indonesian martial art, and music from the masked theater dance, Topeng Banjet, and the Wayang Golek puppet theater.

In the original ketuk tilu, the group typically consists of the ketuk tilu pot-gong, other small gongs, a rebab (spike fiddle), barrel drums, and a female singer-dancer (ronggeng) who is often also a prostitute, who invites men to dance with her sensually. Gugum expanded the drum section as part of an urban gamelan orchestra, sped up the music, redefined the singer as just a singer (Pesindhèn), and came up with the catchy onomatopoeic name. Many listeners consider the music very complex, with the dynamic rhythm liable to change seemingly randomly.

Jaipongan debuted in 1974 when Pak Gugum and his gamelan and dancers first performed in public. Sporadic government attempts to suppress it due to its perceived immorality (it inherited some of the sensuality of ketuk tilu) just made it more popular. It survived even after the official Indonesian ban on foreign pop music was lifted after a few years, and became a craze in the 1980s. Since the mid-1980s Jaipongan's importance as a social dance has waned, but it remained popular as a stage dance, performed by women, mixed couples, or as a solo.

The most widely available album of Jaipongan outside Indonesia is Tonggeret by Idjah Hadidjah and Gugum Gumbira's Jugala orchestra, released in 1987, and re-released as West Java: Sundanese Jaipong and other Popular Music by Nonesuch/Elektra Records.

== Jugala ==
Gugum Gumbira's Jugala Studios in Bandung served as the base for his own Jugala orchestra and dance troupe, and hosted and recorded many other musicians, including Sabah Habas Mustapha, and The Residents.

The Jugala orchestra includes Sundanese gamelan instruments, drums, rebab, and suling flute, and plays Jaipongan and contemporary degung music.

== Personal life ==
Gugum Gumbira was born in Bandung on April 4, 1945. In 1968, he married Euis Komariah (September 9, 1949 – August 11, 2011), who sang for the Jugala Orchestra. Their daughter, Mira Tejaningrum (born March 4, 1969), is a dancer and choreographer for the Jugala dance troupe. Gugum died on January 4, 2020, at Santosa Hospital in Bandung.
