= Ngatmin Nanto =

Indonesian politician

Ngatmin Nanto (born 9 July 1945) is an Indonesian military officer and politician who served as a member of the House of Representatives from 1998 to 2001. He holds the rank of brigadier general in the Indonesian National Armed Forces and has served in various military roles throughout his career.

== Early life and education ==
Ngatmin Nanto was born on 9 July 1945, in Karanganyar, Surakarta, Central Java into a Javanese family. His father, Saman Jaya Reja, worked as a farmer and trader, while his mother, Sukarni Jaya Reja, was also engaged in farming and homemaking. Nanto spent his childhood in Karanganyar, where he completed his education at the 1st state junior high school from 1958 to 1961 and at the 1st state high school from 1961 to 1964. He then attended the Indonesian Military Academy in Magelang, graduating in 1968. He received a degree in administrative sciences from the College of Administrative Sciences of the Institute of State Administration in 1991.

== Career ==
Ngatmin Nanto began his military career as a company commander in the Communications Battalion of the Jakarta Regional Military Command from 1972 to 1975. He then attended a course on defence and security management by the defense department and a course for army communication corps officer in 1976. He was then promoted, before attending an advanced army course in 1979 and a course held by the Indonesian Army Command and Staff College (Seskoad) in Bandung in 1986. He later served as a military instructor at the Indonesian Military Academy in Magelang between 1986 and 1987.

From 1991 to 1994, he was the chief of communications for the Jakarta Regional Military Command. Subsequently, he worked as an assistant officer for technical control in the communications and electronics division of the Indonesian Armed Forces from 1994 to 1998. Around the same time during his service as assistant officer, Ngatmin also became the Executive Chair of the Daily Committee of the Defense Department-Armed Forces Headquarters Tennis Association. He later attended the National Resilience Institute Lecturer Candidate Course in Jakarta in 1994, and the Socio-Political Course at the Armed Forces Staff and Command School in 1997.

Following his military service, Nanto joined the House of Representatives as a delegate of the armed forces through a presidential decree on 23 July 1998. He retained his membership in the parliament and served until his replacement on 27 April 2001 by Abdul Rachman Husin. He served as a member of the parliament's legislative body, and became a member of Commission B, responsible for decrees of the People's Consultative Assembly, and Commission IV (Transportation and Infrastructure), Special Committee for Draft Laws, and the Sub-Commission on Transportation of the House of Representatives.

== Personal life ==
Ngatmin Nanto is married to Sri Triastuty, who is active as a homemaker and as a member of the Armed Forces Family Welfare Association. They have three children. Nanto is fluent in Indonesian and Javanese, with passive knowledge of Karo and Sundanese. His hobbies include playing tennis.

== Honors and awards ==
Throughout his career, Ngatmin Nanto has received several service medals, including the Armed Forces Service Star of eight, sixteen, and twenty-four years, as well as the Army Meritorious Service Star, 3rd Class.
