= Communist Party of Indonesia (Red) =

Communist Party of Indonesia (Red) Partai Komunis Indonesia (Merah)
- Chairman: Mohamad Djoni
- Secretary: Amir Hoesin
- Founded: March 8, 1947
- Ideology: Communism

The Communist Party of Indonesia (Red) (Indonesian: Partai Komunis Indonesia (Merah), PKI Merah) was a political party in Indonesia. It was formed through a split away from the main Communist Party of Indonesia (PKI) in 1947, as a section of the secondary party leadership broke with PKI. The group included Mohamad Djoni (a demagogue from East Sumatra), Amir Hoesin and L.A. Kasim. On March 8–9, 1947 they founded PKI Merah. At the founding meeting of PKI Merah, Djoni was elected chairman, Hoesin party secretary and Kasim treasurer of the party. The split in the PKI had been provoked by differences of opinion on Sardjono's leadership in the party, rather than polemics on theory. Djono had revolted against Sardjono's openness towards the possibility of entering into negotiations with the Netherlands, a position which Djono saw as a deviation from the revolutionary path.

Soon after its foundation, PKI Merah sent a delegation to president Sukarno to seek recognition.

PKI reacted to the split condemning PKI Merah, stating that PKI was the sole genuine Marxist-Leninist party in Indonesia. Furthermore, the PKI argued that PKI Merah was the product of anti-Marxist/anti-Communist reaction. Immediately after the split PKI tried to downplay the importance of PKI Merah (Sardjono called PKI Merah a mere 'atom in the universe of international communism'). However, PKI soon shifted its attitude to the splinter party, and in Magelang a special meeting was held to condemn PKI Merah.

In July 1948, PKI Merah was one of twenty political parties that signed a declaration in support of the National Program.
