= Anwar Udjang =

Indonesian footballer (1948–2008)

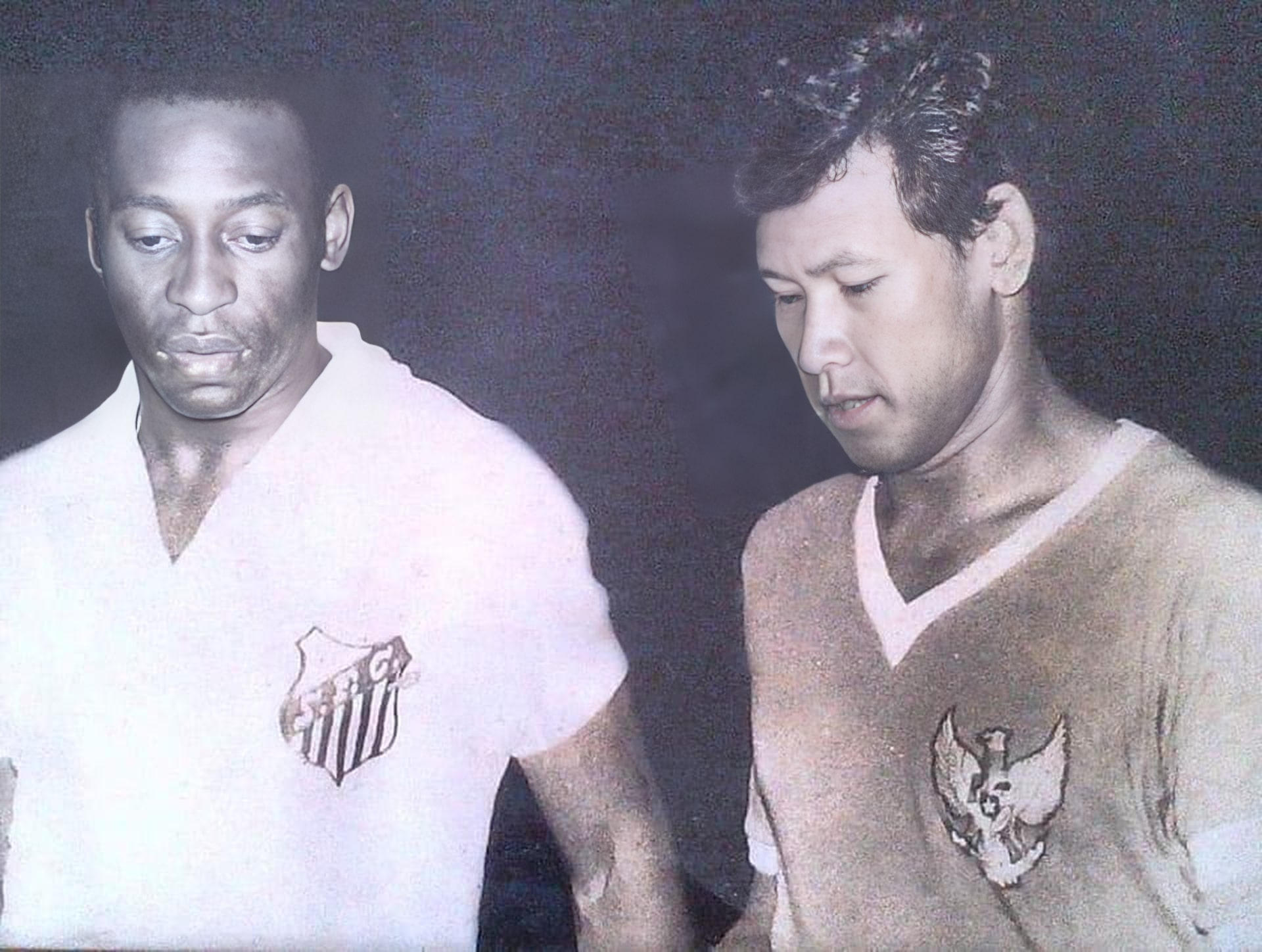
- Anwar (right) with Pelé in 1972

Personal information
- Full name: Anwar Udjang
- Date of birth: 2 March 1945
- Place of birth: Karawang, Japanese occupation of the Dutch East Indies
- Date of death: 18 October 2014 (aged 69)
- Place of death: Medan, Indonesia
- Position: Centre-back

Youth career
- Bond Cikampek
- Persika Karawang

Senior career*
Years	Team	Apps	(Gls)
–1965	Persika Karawang		
1967–1968	Persija Jakarta		
1968–1975	PSMS Medan		
1975–1976	Bintang Utara		

International career
1965–1974	Indonesia		
- * Club domestic league appearances and goals

Anwar Udjang (2 March 1945 – 18 October 2014) was an Indonesian footballer. He was nicknamed "Indonesian Beckenbauer" due to his versatile game and solid defensive work similar to Franz Beckenbauer. He was captain of the Indonesia national football team from 1971 to 1974.

== Career ==
Born on 2 March 1945 in Karawang, Japanese occupation of the Dutch East Indies, Anwar began his career as an employee of Pertamina before switching professions to become a footballer in 1960.

Anwarfirst joined the Indonesia national team in April 1965 and became captain in the period 1971–1974. In his prime, he was often nicknamed the Indonesian Beckenbauer and often played matches against big teams from Europe (UEFA) and Asia (AFC) with the national team.

== Death ==
Anwar died in Medan on 18 October 2014 and was buried there according to his own will, even though he was a native of Karawang.

== Honours ==
=== International ===
- King's Cup (1) : 1968; runner-up: 1969
- Merdeka Tournament (1) : 1969; runner-up: 1971
- Jakarta Anniversary Tournament (1) : 1972; runner-up: 1971, 1973, 1974
- Pesta Sukan Cup (1): 1972
- President's Cup runner-up: 1972

Preceded by Iswadi Idris	Indonesian Captain; 1970–1980	Succeeded by Iswadi Idris
