= Treaty of The Hague (1949) =

Treaty between Indonesia and the Netherlands

The Treaty of Den Haag (also known as the Treaty of The Hague) was signed on December 27, 1949, between representatives from Indonesia and the Netherlands. Based on the terms of the treaty, the Netherlands granted independence to Indonesia except for the West Irian. The accord officially established the Netherlands-Indonesia Union whereby Indonesia was transformed into a federation.
