= 3 November 1945 declaration =

3 November 1945 declaration is an Indonesian declaration which encouraged the formation of political parties as part of democracy. This declaration was released to prepare for the implementation of elections. This declaration can be referred to as the pioneering act of democracy in Indonesia. With this declaration, the government hoped that political parties could be formed before the legislative election in January 1946. This declaration legitimized the political parties that had formed since the Dutch and Japanese periods and also encouraged the continued birth of new political parties. However, the stabilization of democracy in Indonesia through the plan for the 1946 election could not be realized. This is because the Indonesian people were focused on the struggle for independence as a result of the arrival of the Allied military forces. At that time, the election was no longer a priority.
