= Siti Rukiah =

Indonesian poet and novelist (1927–1996)

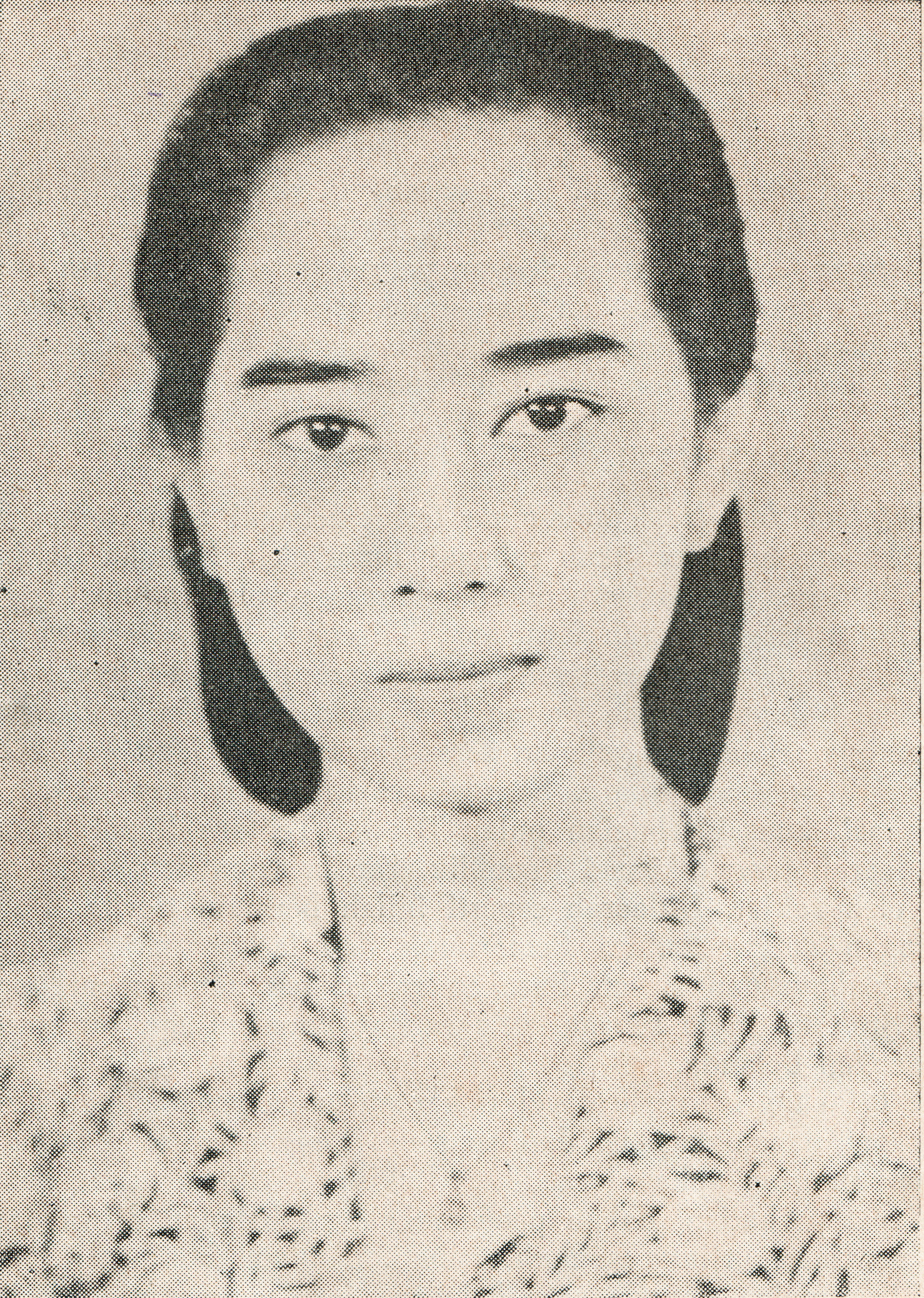
- Roekiah, c. 1955
- Born: Siti Rukiah; 1927, April 25; Tabanan, West Java, Bali
- Died: 1996, June 7 Purwakarta, West Java
- Occupation: Writer
- Spouse: Sidik Kertapati
- Writing career
- Language: Indonesian
- Genres: Novel, poetry
- Notable works: "The Fall and the Heart" (1950)

S. Rukiah (also known as Siti Rukiah Kertapati; April 25, 1927 – June 7, 1996) was an Indonesian poet and novelist.

== Biography ==
Siti Rukiah was born in Purwakarta, West Java on April 25, 1927. After her graduation, she pursued teaching in Purwakarta, before initiating her career into writing. She began by writing poems for magazines like "Zaman Gelombang" (Era of Waves), and moved on to write short stories, children's stories and novels. In 1948, she joined the literary magazine Poedjangga Baroe as its Purwakarta correspondent, and in 1950 she moved to Jakarta to become the journal's editorial secretary. Her first novel also appeared in 1950, entitled Kedjatuhan dan Hati (The Fall and the Heart). Though a lesser known classic, the novel strongly presents the dark side of the revolution touching the lives of peoples and their emotions. The novel precedes Elena Ferrante’s theme about being young and intellectual and belonging to the women’s category, the impact of social policy and feminism, political ideologies and reality, economic independence, and acceptance from family. The novel is a forceful rendition of a woman's struggle during the country's independence struggle as well as in the period post-independence. It stands as the only novel that explores the negative impact of war on personal relationship through the character of a middle-class woman who lived during the Indonesian National Revolution. Realizing its significance as a classic piece of prose by a woman writer before the 1970s, Rukiah's novel became one of the first five titles chosen by the Lontar Foundation for its new Modern Library of Indonesia series.

In 1951, she relocated to Bandung and became the editor of the children's magazine Paradise. In 1952, her collection of short stories and poems was published under the title Deficient, which won national literary prize. In the same year she started writing children's stories under her married name, "S. Rukiah Kertapati", and published continuously in this field until 1964. She also compiled an anthology of realistic fiction in the form of short stories with her lover and husband, Sidik Kertapati, titled The Love Love, along with another collection, Teragedi Humanity.

Though Rukiah never joined LEKRA, the cultural wing of the Indonesian Communist Party (PKI), she was chosen the member of LEKRA central leadership in 1959. Owing to this affiliation, her books were banned during the overthrow of President Sukarno and the forbidding of the Indonesian Communist Party (PKI) in 1965. As a result of the events of 1965, she suffered emotional trauma, which put a halt to her creative self.

== Publications ==
- Rukiah, S. (1950). Kedjatuhan dan hati (in Indonesian). Jakarta: Pustaka Rakjat. OCLC 40912761.
- Rukiah, S. (1954). Kenang-kenangan dari tanah rentjong: Teuku Hassan Djohan Pahlawan (in Indonesian). Jakarta: Grafika. OCLC 42594708.
- Rukiah, S. (1957). Teuku Hassan Djohan Pahlawan: kenang-kenangan dari tanah rentjong (in Indonesian). Jakarta: Grafika. OCLC 21650508.
- Rukiah, S. (1958). Tandus (in Indonesian). Jakarta: Balai Pustaka. OCLC 607761.
- Rukiah, S. (1959). Taman sandjak si Ketjil; batjaan anak² umur 8-10 tahun (in Indonesian). Jakarta: Balai Pustaka. OCLC 36682963.
- Rukiah, S. (1959). Kisah perdjalanan si Apin (in Indonesian). Jakarta: Grafica. OCLC 63863199.
- Rukiah, S. (1961). Pak Supi kakek pengungsi (in Indonesian). Jakarta: Swada. OCLC 42908528.
- Rukiah, S. (1962). Djaka tingkir (in Indonesian). Jakarta: Balai Pustaka. OCLC 4278836.
- Rukiah, S. (1962). Dongeng² Kutilang (in Indonesian). Jakarta: Jajasan Kebudajaan Sadar. OCLC 752244.
- Rukiah, S. (1964). Tandus: sandjak-sandjak (in Indonesian). Jakarta: P.N. Balai Pustaka. OCLC 13474416.
- Rukiah, S. (1964). Sekumpulan fabel Junani kuno (in Indonesian). Jakarta: Jajasan Kebudajan Sader. OCLC 63839566.
- Rukiah, S. (1964). 20 dongeng pilihan (in Indonesian). Jakarta: Jajasan Kebudajaan Sadar. OCLC 63863200.
- Rukiah, S. (1965). Si Lenting Kuning (in Indonesian). Jakarta: Swada. OCLC 652182.
- Rukiah, S. (2010). Kedjatuhan dan hati [The fall and the heart]. Jakarta: Lontar. ISBN 978-979-8083-77-8. OCLC 689022533.
