= Luthfi Dahlan =

Indonesian police officer (born 1945)

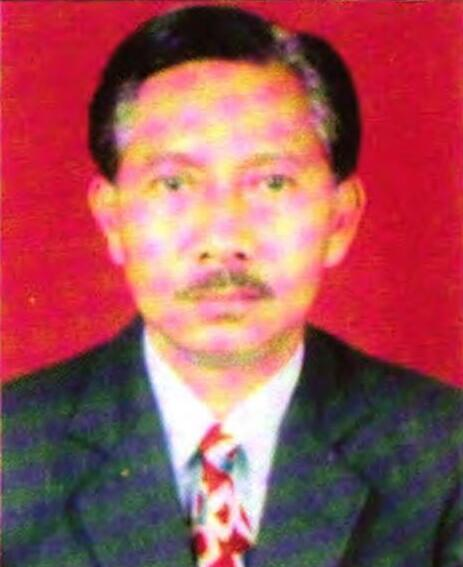

Inspector General of the Department of Religious Affairs
- In office 7 August 1998 – 29 May 2000
- Preceded by: Sukarya A.G.
- Succeeded by: Mochtar Zarkasyi

Deputy Chief of the Indonesian National Police
- In office 22 July 1997 – 7 September 1998
- Preceded by: Pamoedji (1984)
- Succeeded by: Nana S. Permana

Personal details
- Born: February 28, 1945 (age 81) Porong, Sidoarjo, East Java, Dutch East Indies

Military service
- Allegiance: Indonesia
- Branch/service: Indonesian National Police
- Years of service: 1968—2000
- Rank: Police Lieutenant General

Luthfi Dahlan (born 28 February 1945) is an Indonesian retired police officer. He was the Deputy Chief of the Indonesian National Police from 1997 until 1998 and the Inspector General of the Department of Religious Affairs from 1998 until 2000.

== Career ==
Luthfi was born on 28 February 1945 in Porong, a small town in the Sidoarjo Regency of East Java. Upon completing high school, he entered the police academy and graduated in 1968. His first assignment was in South Kalimantan, where he quickly rose to become a platoon commander in the police regiment three years later. He then continued his studies at the Higher Police Science College, receiving a degree from the latter in 1975. Luthfi returned to South Kalimantan and was appointed as the chief of investigation at the Pontianak police and the deputy chief of the Kapuas Hulu police.

Luthfi underwent further education in policing at the police leadership school in 1981. He was then sent to Central Kalimantan as a police officer in the community development unit. Three years later, Luthfi was assigned to the police leadership school, where he consecutively become the head of the management department and the chief of planning. From the school, he was sent to Malang in 1988 as deputy police chief. In 1991, Luthfi returned to Jakarta as an assistant officer for management system in the central police planning staff.

Upon completing the Armed Forces Staff and Command School in 1991 and the National Resilience Institute in 1993, Luthfi became the secretary of the community development directorate. After two years, in 1995 Luthfi was appointed to head the Police Mental Guidance Service.

Luthfi became the Director for Personnel Planning and Control inside the police headquarters with the rank of brigadier general. He was promoted to the rank of major general in 1996, becoming the assistant for planning to police chief Dibyo Widodo. The next year, on 22 June 1997, Luthfi was appointed as the Deputy Chief of the Indonesian National Police. The post had been left empty since 1984 until then. On 4 August 1997, Luthfi was promoted to the rank of lieutenant general.

Following the fall of Suharto, on 7 August 1998 Luthfi was installed as the Inspector General of the Department of Religious Affairs. Luthfi held this office until 29 May 2000 and retired from the police shortly after. In 2010, Luthfi become the deputy president commissioner of the Indonesian Prima Property company.

== Personal life ==
Luthfi is fluent in English, French, Javanese, Sundanese, and Madurese.

== Awards ==
- Military Long Service Medals, 2nd Category (Indonesian: Satyalancana Kesetiaan 24 Tahun)
- Medal for Combat Against Communists (Indonesian: Satyalancana Penegak)
- Medal for Concrete Work in the Police Force (Indonesian: Satyalancana Karya Bhakti)
- Police Long Service Medal (Indonesian: Satyalancana Prasetya Pancawarsa)
