= Ahmad Mushaddeq =

Ahmad Mushaddeq (born 1945) is the founder of Milah Abraham, a religious movement within Islam. He is seen by his 50,000 plus followers as a spiritual successor to Muhammad.

Mushaddeq was at one point a coach on the Indonesia national badminton team.
