= Ronggeng =

Javanese traditional dance

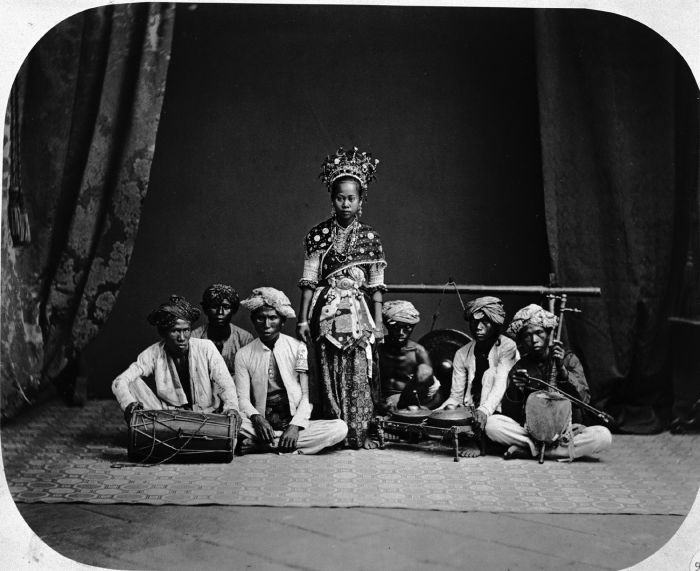
- Ronggeng ensemble (ca. 1870)
- Native name: ꦫꦺꦴꦁꦒꦺꦁ (Javanese); Tari Ronggeng (Indonesian)
- Genre: Traditional dance
- Instrument(s): Gamelan, Gong, Rebab, Kendhang
- Inventor: Javanese
- Origin: Indonesia

Ronggeng (from Javanese ꦫꦺꦴꦁꦒꦺꦁ 'ronggèng') is a type of Javanese dance in which couples exchange poetic verses as they dance to the music of a rebab or violin and a gong. Ronggeng originated in Java, Indonesia.

When performed in its entirety, it depicts the different stages of courtship, characterized by an increasingly fast-paced rhythm. According to Malay customs, there is no physical contact between the dancers, although its subject matter has often led to it being associated with sexual taboos.

== History ==
Ronggeng has probably existed in Java since ancient times, as the bas reliefs in the Karmawibhanga section of the eighth-century Borobudur display the scene of a travelling entertainment troupe with musicians and female dancers. In Java, a traditional ronggeng performance features a travelling dance troupe, who would have been the ones bringing this form of entertainment village-to-village.

The origin of the name is debated, as some attribute it to the Portuguese (who are said to have taken it directly from Javanese, where it would mean “one for the other”) and others to the English (from “wrong gang,” apparently following a fight that took place at a dance hall).

It reached its peak between 1936 and 1960, when a group of rural artists spread this art form throughout Indonesia, eventually reaching Thailand and the Andaman Coast as well.Since the 2000s, it has experienced a new resurgence, linked to local nationalism and the passing down of folk tales.

This dance is closely associated with themes of sexuality and courtship, which is why it has come to have a dubious reputation, even being considered a form of prostitution disguised as art.

== In popular culture ==
Ronggeng is the main theme of Ahmad Tohari's novel Ronggeng Dukuh Paruk, which tells the story of a dancer girl who is also a prostitute, in a remote village in Central Java. Ronggeng is closely related to Sundanese Jaipongan dance. Apart from that, Javanese ronggeng also influenced the art of the Sula people, which is known as ronggeng gala.

== See also ==
- Gamelan
- Javanese culture
- Dance in Indonesia
