= Kusumah Atmaja =

Indonesian judge and national hero (1898 – 1952)

Dr. Raden Kusumah Atmaja
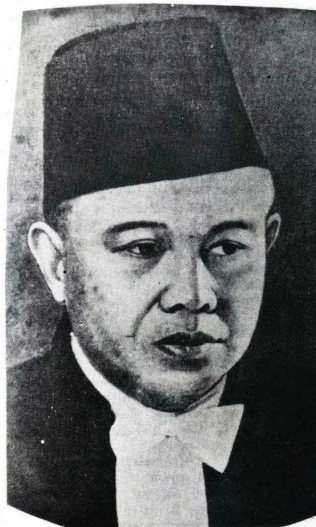
- Portrait, date unknown

1st Chief Justice of the Supreme Court of Indonesia
- In office 19 August 1945 – 11 August 1952
- Nominated by: Sukarno
- Preceded by: Office established
- Succeeded by: Wirjono Prodjodikoro

Personal details
- Born: Sulaiman Effendi Kusumah Atmaja; 8 September 1898 Purwakarta, Dutch East Indies
- Died: 11 August 1952 (aged 53) Jakarta, Indonesia
- Education: Leiden University
- Occupation: Judge
- Awards: National Hero of Indonesia

Sulaiman Effendi Kusumah Atmaja (EVO: Soelaiman Effendi Koesoemah Atmadja; 8 September 1898 – 11 August 1952) was an Indonesian judge and national hero who served as the first chief justice of the Supreme Court of Indonesia from August 1945 until August 1952. He was born to a noble ethnic-Sundanese family in Purwakarta, and obtained a law diploma from the Rechtschool in 1913. In 1919, he worked as a court clerk in Bandung, before leaving that job to continue his legal education at Leiden University. After graduating from Leiden in 1922, he returned to the East Indies, and became a judge in Batavia and later Indramayu.

During the Japanese occupation period, he continued working as a court official, serving as chief justices in the courts of Semarang and Padang. He became a member of the Investigating Committee for Preparatory Work for Independence in March 1945, and following the proclamation of independence, he played a role in the formation of the supreme court. On 19 August 1945, he was appointed chief justice by President Sukarno. As chief justice, he was involved in the prosecution of the officers who had been involved in the 3 July Affair and served as the legal advisor to the Indonesian delegation at the Dutch–Indonesian Round Table Conference. He died on 11 August 1952, in Jakarta, and his body was interred in the Heroes' Cemetery in Kalibata.

== Early life ==
Kusumah Atmaja was born on 8 September 1898, to a noble family in Purwakarta Regency, Purwakarta, West Java.

He obtained his diploma from the Recht Hoge School (literally 'High School of Justice') in 1913.

Kusumah Atmadja started his career as a court clerk in 1919 and was seconded to the Court at Buitenzorg (now Bogor). That same year he received a scholarship to continue his legal education at the University of Leiden.

In 1922 he completed his studies. He obtained the title Doctor in de rechtsgeleerheid with a dissertation entitled De Mohamedaansche Vrome Stichtingen in Indië (Institute of Islamic Scholars in the Dutch East Indies), in which he outlined the law of war in the Dutch East Indies.

== Judicial career ==
Upon his return to the Dutch East Indies, Kusumah Atmadja was offered a position as a judge at the Raad Van Justitie (High Court) in Batavia (now Jakarta) After a year, Kusumah Atmadja was appointed Landraad Voorzitter (Chairman of the District Court) in Indramayu.

He was listed as a High Court judge in Padang, chairman of the District Court in Semarang, and then a High Court judge in the same city.

When the Japanese occupied the Dutch East Indies, evicting the Dutch, Kusumah Atmadja continued as a court official. In 1942, he served as Chairman of Chihoo Hooin (District Court) in Semarang. In addition, he was also appointed as Chief Justice for Central Java in 1944.

== Member of BPUPK ==
Atmaja became a member of the Investigating Committee for Preparatory Work for Independence (BPUPK), on 29 April 1945. The body was an effort to gain the support of the Indonesian people using the promise of Japanese help for Indonesian independence.

== Indonesian Independence Era ==
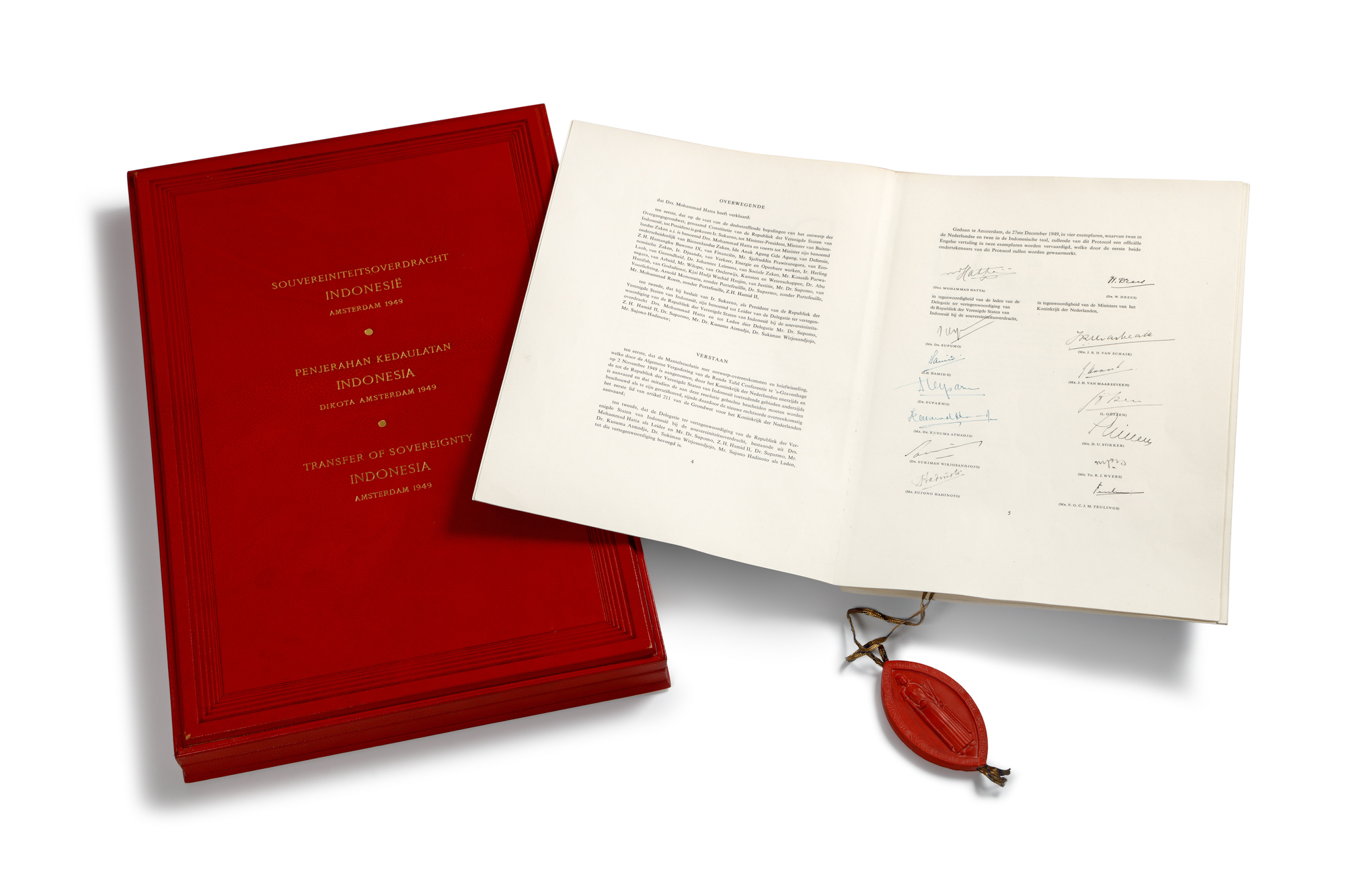
Signature of Kusumah Atmaja on the Treaty ending Dutch rule over Indonesia

After Indonesia declared its independence on August 17, 1945, Atmaja was assigned to establish the country's Supreme Court in 1950. He served as the first Chief Justice from 1950 until his death in 1952.

He was asked by the Dutch State to lead the formation of the Dutch puppet state of Pasundan in 1947, but refused.

== Death ==
Prof. Dr. Raden Soelaiman Koesoemah Atmadja Effendi died on 11 August 1952, in Jakarta and was buried in Karet Bivak Cemetery.

== Recognition ==
Atmadja was awarded the title of National Hero of Indonesia by Presidential Decree No. 124/1965.

Legal offices
Preceded by Established	Chief Justice of the Supreme Court of Indonesia; 1945–1952	Succeeded by Wirjono Prodjodikoro
