= 2003 Davao City ferry terminal bombing =

2003 terrorist attack on a ferry terminal in Davao City, the Philippines

- Part of the Moro conflict
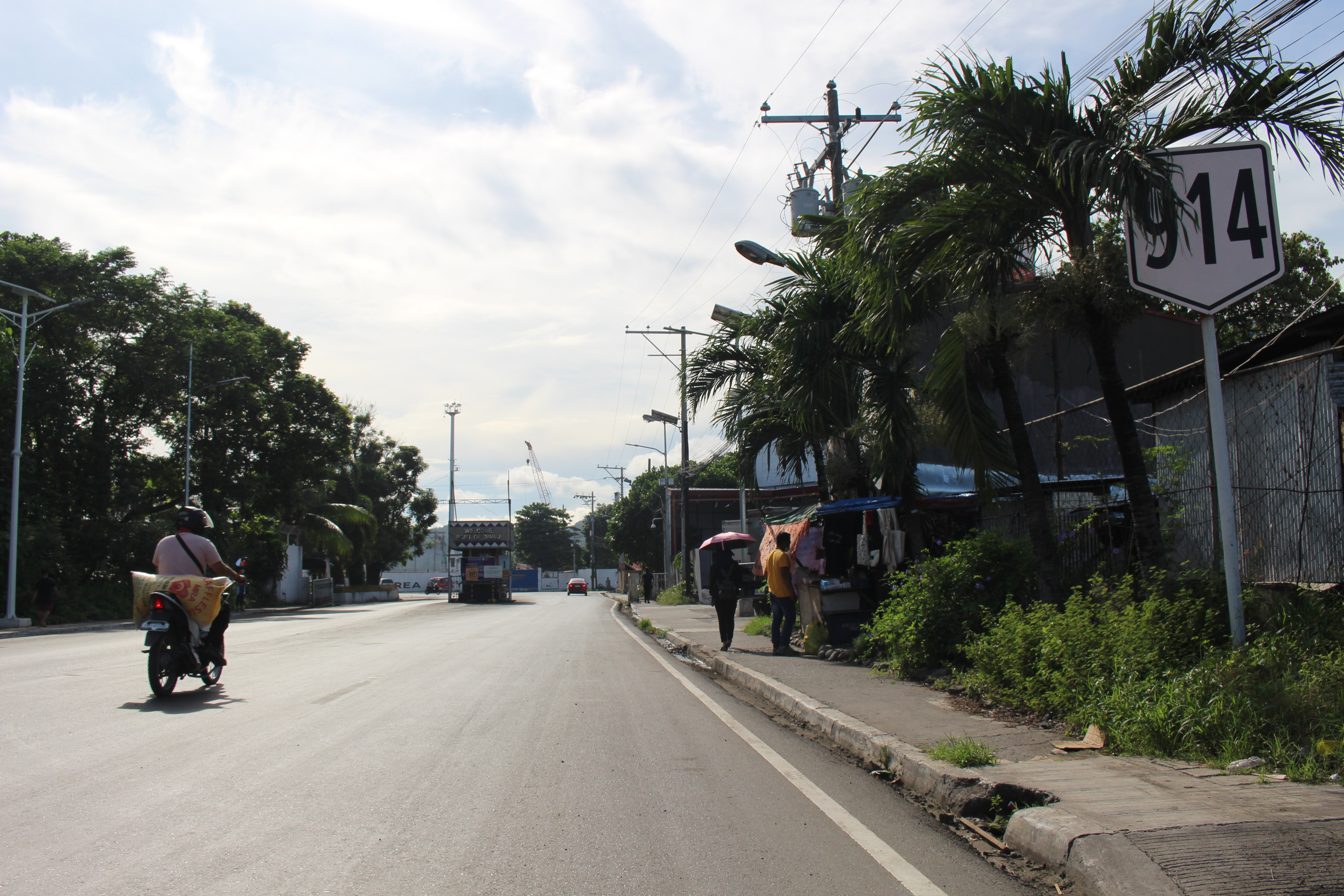
- The entrance to Davao City ferry terminal, taken in 2021

- Port of Davao (Mindanao mainland)
- Location: 7.13174°N 125.66173°E; Sasa, Buhangin, Davao City, Philippines
- Date: April 2, 2003 c. 19:00 (PST)
- Target: Civilians
- Attack type: Bombing
- Weapon: Improvised explosive device
- Deaths: 17
- Injuries: 56
- Victims: Pablita Espera; Mark Gariel Espera; Gadilyn Espera; Bonnel Songaling Espera; Jemarie Grace Espera; Danilo Pandapatan; Jaylord Amarillento; Ian Nicko Banal; Rene Oyami; Bryan Gesulga; Noriel Juarez; Soledad Puno; Christopher Morales; June Rey Morales; Rodito Asis; Albert Gumata; Sister Dulce De Guzman
- Perpetrators: Moro Islamic Liberation Front (suspected); Jemaah Islamiyah (suspected)
- Accused: Toto Akman; Jimmy Bululao; Tohami Bagundang; Ting Idar; Esmael Mamalangkas
- Charges: Murder and attempted murder
- Verdict: Guilty
- Convicted: Toto Akman

The Davao City ferry terminal bombing was a terrorist attack that occurred on the evening of April 2, 2003 at the Sasa wharf section of the Port of Davao in Mindanao, Philippines. It was believed to be carried out by members of the Moro Islamic Liberation Front (MILF), an Islamist group fighting against the Manila government for an autonomous region in the southern Philippines. Authorities also suspected members of the jihadist pan-Islamist militant organization Jemaah Islamiyah (JI) of involvement in the attack. The bombing, which occurred nearly one month after a similar fatal terrorist attack on the nearby Davao International Airport, killed 17 civilians and injured over 50 others.

== Background ==
From the times of Spanish colonial rule in the late 1500s, the Muslim-majority Moro people have been fighting for an autonomous region in Mindanao from Christian-majority governments in Luzon. By the 20th century, the Moro conflict had produced several armed militant Islamic groups in the region, one the most prominent being the Moro Islamic Liberation Front (MILF), which sought the establishment of a Moro republic through the force of arms.

Although an Autonomous Region in Muslim Mindanao was created by the Aquino government in August 1989 through Republic Act No. 6734, the MILF refused to accept this offer and continued their insurgency operations. In Davao City, MILF members were believed to be responsible for a December 1993 grenade attack on San Pedro Cathedral that killed 6 civilians and wounded over 130 other victims.

In early February 2003, the Armed Forces of the Philippines stormed a MILF stronghold in Pagalungan, which resulted in the death of an estimated 160 militants during the Battle of the Buliok Complex. A few weeks afterwards, MILF leader Salamat Hashim released an audio message for broadcast, informing his followers that "we have to fight back”. In late February 2003, a fatal car bombing at Awang Airport in Cotabato City was blamed on the MILF. A night time sabotage attack on the Mindanao electricity grid around the same time, which resulted in 18 million people being cut off after half a dozen transmission towers were blown up in Lanao del Norte, was also attributed to the MILF.

On March 4, 2003, the Davao City airport bombing killed 22 people and injured 113 others, and caused substantial damage to the terminal building itself. Minutes later, separate explosions were reported at the Ecoland Bus Terminal in Davao City's Talomo District and also outside a health center in nearby Tagum City, which wounded two civilians.

== Bomb attack ==
At around 7 pm PST (11 am UTC) on April 2, 2003, an improvised explosive device hidden inside a cardboard box detonated at a fast food stall outside the Sasa wharf in Davao City. The resulting explosion killed 17 people and left another 56 injured. Witnesses at the scene would later describe how two men carrying a cardboard box had earlier approached the entrance to the Port of Davao around the time a ferry had arrived, but had apparently changed their minds after seeing officials inspecting packages at a security checkpoint. The men instead sat down at a table beside a barbecue stand and ordered chicken Shish kebabs, and the bomb exploded there about 10 minutes after they left the scene.

In the immediate aftermath of the explosion at Sasa wharf, a series of retaliatory attacks were carried out on mosques throughout Davao City. At 2am on the night of the attack, unidentified men threw grenades and opened fire with assault rifles at a mosque in Tibungco, while an improvised explosive device was thrown at a mosque on Roxas Boulevard about an hour later. A bomb explosion was also reported outside a mosque in Toril around the same time.

In a press release, Davao Mayor Rodrigo Duterte asked people travelling to the city to avoid wearing backpacks or carrying bags unless absolutely necessary, as he had instructed authorities to increase searches of personal belongings in response to the recent spate of attacks.

== Investigation ==
The day after the attack, MILF spokesman Eid Kabalu condemned the bombing of Sasa wharf and denied his group was responsible. Preliminary investigations by local law enforcement agencies determined that the Sasa ferry terminal bombing, along with the previous explosion at Davao City airport, were both carried out by MILF operatives with the assistance of Jemaah Islamiyah In early April 2003, police in Cotabato City arrested five men (Toto Akman, Jimmy Bululao, Tohami Bagundang, Ting Idar and Esmael Mamalangkas) on suspicion of involvement in the earlier bomb attacks in Davao City, with the suspects facing multiple criminal charges of murder and frustrated murder.

In late October 2004, Philippine National Police in Manila arrested MILF member Abdul Manap Mentang on charges of conspiring to bomb the US Embassy. While under interrogation, Mentang admitted responsibility for the attacks on Davao airport and Sasa ferry port, which he claimed were directed by a senior Jemaah Islamiyah leader named Zulkifli Abdhir. However, in January 2005 Mentang was released by Philippine authorities in an amnesty, after the MILF had threatened to cancel their precipitation in the Bangsamoro peace process talks unless all members of their organization were released from prison and absolved of all criminal charges. In 2016, Mentang was again apprehended by Philippine law enforcement for questioning in relation to the 2005 Valentine's Day bombings, which had resulted in the deaths of 9 civilians during near simultaneous attacks at a mall in General Santos, a bus station in Davao City, and on board a bus in the Makati district of Manila.

== Convictions ==
In January 2010, at the end of a criminal trial at Regional Trial Court 12, Presiding Judge Pelagio Paguican found Toto Akman guilty of direct participation in the Sasa ferry port bomb attack in Davao City and sentenced him to life in prison, with a minimum term of 40 years. Akman was also ordered to pay PHP 4.125 million in civil damages to the survivors of the attack. The judge had earlier acquitted Akman and four other defendants (Jimmy Bululao, Tohami Bagundang, Ting Idar and Esmael Mamalangkas) of murder charges relating to the Davao City airport bombing, citing lack of evidence to warrant a conviction.

== Allegations of false flag attack ==
Philippine military officers involved in the July 2003 Oakwood mutiny alleged that the Davao City airport bombing, along with a second explosion at Sasa ferry port, were false flag operations involving US intelligence agencies. A mysterious incident the previous year, regarding an explosion at Evergreen Hotel in downtown Davao City and the perpetrator (67-year-old hotel guest Michael Meiring) then being whisked out of the country by US federal agents, gave rise to conspiracy theories that Meiring was responsible for false flag operations designed to induce the Philippine government to grant American authorities greater influence locally in regards to the war on terror.

Articles in the BusinessWorld newspaper specifically accused Meiring of being a Central Intelligence Agency agent involved in covert operations in Southeast Asia, who staged terrorist atrocities to destabilize the Mindanao region with the intent to justify increased military operations against the MILF, and thus incentivize an increased US military presence in the Philippines. In 2016, President Rodrigo Duterte was quoted by the media in linking the terrorist attacks on Davao City airport and Sasa ferry port, along with the earlier Evergreen Hotel explosion, to covert American intelligence agencies.

== See also ==
- Terrorism in Davao City
- Terrorism in the Philippines
- 2003 Davao City airport bombing
- 2016 Davao City bombing
