= 2003 Davao City airport bombing =

2003 terrorist attack on International Airport in Davao City, the Philippines

- Part of the Moro conflict
- Davao City airport terminal (2008)

- Davao International Airport (Mindanao mainland)
- Location: 7.13078°N 125.64484°E; Sasa, Buhangin, Davao City, Philippines
- Date: March 4, 2003; 17:20 (PST)
- Target: Civilians
- Attack type: Suicide Bombing
- Weapon: Improvised explosive device
- Deaths: 22
- Injuries: 113
- Victims: Dariusa Lafuente; Miguel Alcaria; Gregorio Pusta; Samuel Ramos; Cecilia Aligato Tsuboshima; Ailene Galo; Cayatano Calesa Jr; Armand Picar; Leonardo Laborte; Julius Maunas; Felimon Lantapon; Celeste Aruta; Mary Ann Carnecer; Lowedie Marilao; Chonadale Parilla; Kenneth Rasay; William Hyde; Ronieta Odog; Ledona Lumanda; Adela Fugata; Reina Fideliz Juan
- Perpetrators: Moro Islamic Liberation Front (suspected); Jemaah Islamiyah (suspected)
- Assailant: Montazer Sudang (suicide bomber)
- Accused: Jimmy Bululao; Tohami Bagundang; Ting Idar; Esmael Mamalangkas; Toto Akman
- Charges: Murder and attempted murder
- Verdict: Acquittal
- Convicted: 0

The Davao City airport bombing was a terrorist attack that occurred on the evening of March 4, 2003 at the Francisco Bangoy International Airport on the outskirts of Davao City in Mindanao, the Philippines. It was believed to be carried out by members of the Moro Islamic Liberation Front (MILF), an Islamist group fighting against the Manila government for an autonomous region in the southern Philippines. Authorities also suspected members of the jihadist pan-Islamist militant organization Jemaah Islamiyah of involvement in the attack. The suicide bombing killed 22 civilians and injured over 100 others, making it the deadliest terrorist incident to have been perpetrated in Davao City.

== Background ==
From the times of Spanish colonial rule in the late 1500s, the Muslim-majority Moro people have been fighting for an autonomous region in Mindanao from Christian-majority governments in Luzon. By the 20th century, the Moro conflict had produced several armed militant Islamic groups in the region, one of the most prominent being the Moro Islamic Liberation Front (MILF), which sought the establishment of a Moro republic through the force of arms.

Although an Autonomous Region in Muslim Mindanao was created by the Aquino government in August 1989 through Republic Act No. 6734, the MILF refused to accept this offer and continued their insurgency operations. In Davao City, MILF members were believed to be responsible for a December 1993 grenade attack on San Pedro Cathedral that killed 6 civilians and wounded over 130 other victims.

In early February 2003, the Armed Forces of the Philippines stormed a MILF stronghold in Pagalungan, which resulted in the death of an estimated 160 militants during the Battle of the Buliok Complex. A few weeks afterwards, MILF leader Salamat Hashim released an audio message for broadcast, informing his followers that "we have to fight back”. In late February 2003, a fatal car bombing at Awang Airport in Cotabato City was blamed on the MILF. A night time sabotage attack on the Mindanao electricity grid around the same time, which resulted in 18 million people being cut off after half a dozen transmission towers were blown up in Lanao del Norte, was also attributed to the MILF.

== Bomb attack ==
At 5:20 pm PST (9:20 am UTC) on March 4, 2003, an improvised explosive device hidden inside a backpack exploded in the busy waiting area of Francisco Bangoy International Airport on the outskirts of Davao City. The terminal was crowded with people after a Cebu Pacific flight from Manila had landed a few minutes earlier. The blast killed 22 people and injured 113 others, and caused substantial damage to the terminal building itself. Minutes later, separate explosions were reported at the Ecoland Bus Terminal in Davao City's Talomo District and also outside a health center in nearby Tagum City, which wounded two civilians. Dr. Joselito Cembrano would later describe how Davao Doctors Hospital was overwhelmed by incoming casualties from the airport attack, with many victims suffering from severe shrapnel wounds, and that the hospital blood bank was soon exhausted of supplies.

== Aftermath ==
The following day, President Gloria Arroyo visited the scene of the airport attack to a lay a wreath for the victims who perished in the atrocity. President Arroyo described the bombing as a "brazen act of terrorism which shall not go unpunished". US President George W. Bush also denounced the attack and vowed to help Filipino authorities in tracking down those who were responsible. Officials from the American Federal Bureau of Investigation would later assist local police in sifting through evidence at the airport and also to perform an autopsy on the body of the suspected suicide bomber who carried out the attack. Australian Federal Police were also involved in the investigation, to determine if there were any links with the October 2002 Bali bombings.

In an interview with ABS CBN, a senior commander of the Abu Sayyaf Jihadist militant group named Hamsiraji Marusi Sali claimed responsibility for the attack on Davao airport, however this was dismissed by the Philippine authorities as a propaganda stunt. The Moro Islamic Liberation Front was suspected of carrying out the near simultaneous bombings by Davao City mayor Rodrigo Duterte, who revealed that authorities had received intelligence reports in February 2003 that Davao City would be targeted with no warning bomb attacks unless the Philippines Military halted its offensive against the MILF in Maguindanao del Sur. All accusations of involvement in the airport attack were immediately denied by the MILF in a communiqué to local media. However, inquiries by the Philippine National Police identified 23-year-old Montazer Sudang, who had links to the MILF, as the airport bomber. The PNP believed the explosion was caused by a large pipe bomb hidden in Sudang's backpack, which also resulted in his own death.

On April 2, 2003, a similar ferry terminal bombing near a barbecue stand by the Sasa wharf in Davao City killed 17 people and left another 56 injured. In response to these escalating terrorist attacks, Filipino authorities established the Task Force Davao paramilitary unit, with a mission to secure Davao City from future terrorist related incidents and also aid the civil power to maintain order. The unit soon had over 700 heavily armed members, who would patrol the downtown area in full battle dress and mount security checkpoints at strategic transport nodes.

== Investigation ==
Preliminary investigations by local law enforcement agencies determined that the Davao City airport bombing, along with the explosion at Sasa ferry port, were both carried out by MILF operatives with the assistance of Jemaah Islamiyah In early April 2003, police in Cotabato City arrested five men (Toto Akman, Jimmy Bululao, Tohami Bagundang, Ting Idar and Esmael Mamalangkas) on suspicion of involvement in the earlier bomb attacks in Davao City, with the suspects facing multiple criminal charges of murder and frustrated murder. In late October 2004, Philippine National Police in Manila arrested MILF member Abdul Manap Mentang on charges of conspiring to bomb the US Embassy. While under interrogation, Mentang admitted responsibility for the attacks on Davao airport and Sasa ferry port, which he claimed were directed by a senior Jemaah Islamiyah leader named Zulkifli Abdhir.

However, in January 2005 Mentang was released by Philippine authorities in an amnesty, after the MILF had threatened to cancel their precipitation in the Bangsamoro peace process talks unless all members of their organization were released from prison and absolved of all criminal charges. In 2016, Mentang was again apprehended by Philippine law enforcement for questioning in relation to the 2005 Valentine's Day bombings, which resulted in the deaths of 9 civilians during near simultaneous attacks at a mall in General Santos, a bus station in Davao City, and onboard a bus in the Makati district of Manila.

== Convictions ==
In January 2010, at the end of a criminal trial at Regional Trial Court 12, Presiding Judge Pelagio Paguican acquitted five defendants (Toto Akman, Jimmy Bululao, Tohami Bagundang, Ting Idar and Esmael Mamalangkas) of murder charges relating to the Davao City airport bombing, citing lack of evidence to warrant a conviction. However, the Judge did find Toto Akman guilty of direct participation in the Sasa ferry port bomb attack in Davao City and sentenced him to life in prison, with a minimum term of 40 years. Akman was also ordered to pay PHP 4.125 million in civil damages to the survivors of the attack.

== Allegations of false flag attack ==
Philippine military officers involved in the July 2003 Oakwood mutiny alleged that the Davao City airport bombing, along with a second explosion at Sasa ferry port, were false flag operations involving US intelligence agencies. A mysterious incident the previous year, regarding an explosion at Evergreen Hotel in downtown Davao City and the perpetrator (67-year-old hotel guest Michael Meiring) then being whisked out of the country by US federal agents, gave rise to conspiracy theories that Meiring was responsible for false flag operations designed to induce the Philippine government to grant American authorities greater influence locally in regards to the war on terror.

Articles in the BusinessWorld newspaper specifically accused Meiring of being a Central Intelligence Agency agent involved in covert operations in Southeast Asia, who staged terrorist atrocities to destabilize the Mindanao region with the intent to justify increased military operations against the MILF, and thus incentivize an increased US military presence in the Philippines. In 2016, President Rodrigo Duterte was quoted by the media in linking the terrorist attacks on Davao City airport and Sasa ferry port, along with the earlier Evergreen Hotel explosion, to covert American intelligence agencies.

== See also ==
- Terrorism in Davao City
- Terrorism in the Philippines
- 2003 Davao City ferry terminal bombing
- 2016 Davao City bombing
