= Terrorism in Davao City =

Terrorist attacks and terrorist groups in Davao City, the Philippines

Moro conflict, War on Terror, Communist armed conflicts in the Philippines
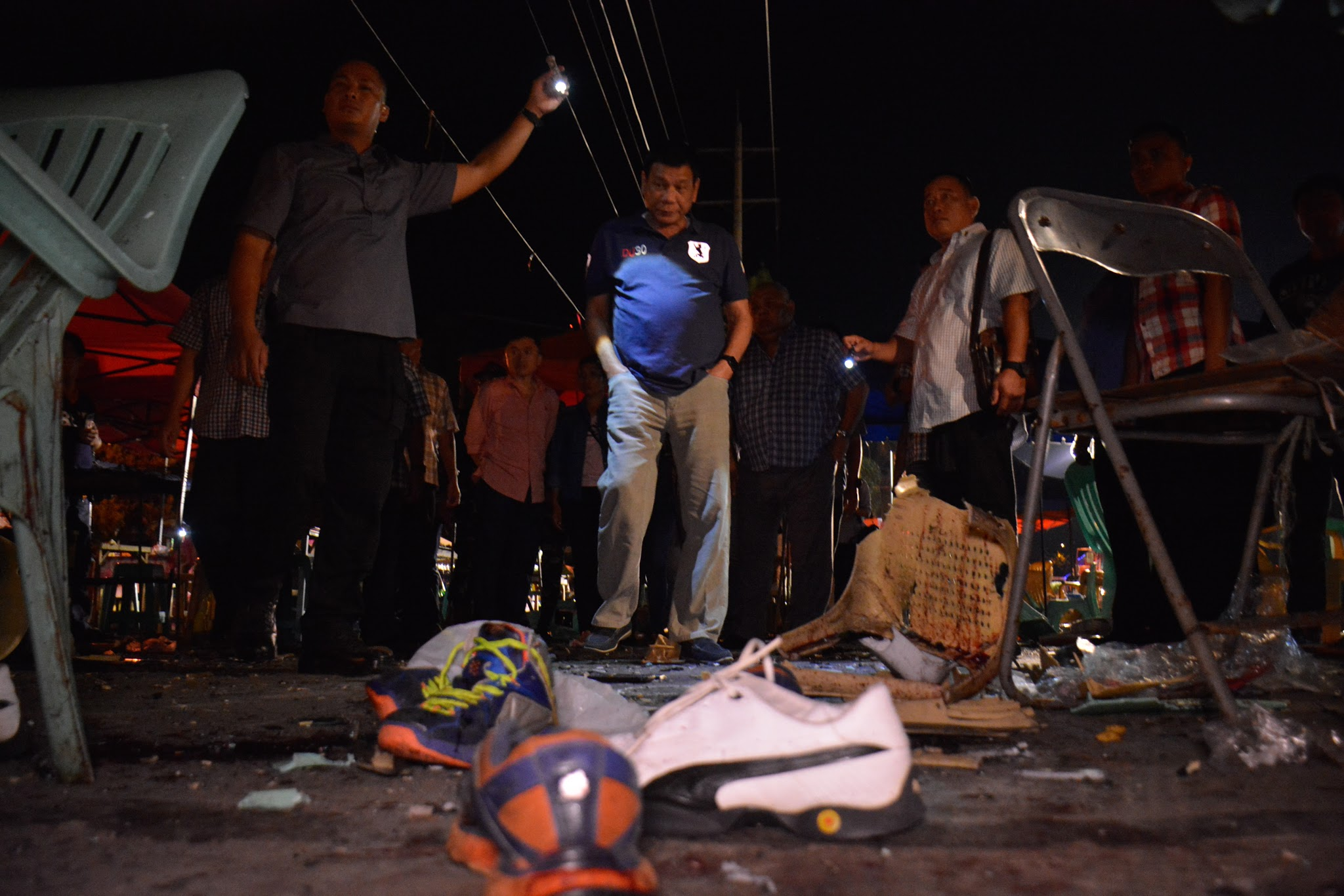
- President Rodrigo Duterte visits the blast site of the Roxas Night Market bombing in 2016
Date	19 April 1981 – present
Location	Davao City, the Philippines 7.0754°N 125.6111°E
Status	Ongoing
- Location within Mindanao mainland

Multiple terrorist attacks have occurred in Davao City metropolitan area during the 20th and 21st centuries. Despite Davao City being consistently ranked as the safest city in the Philippines and one of the safest cities in Southeast Asia, its location in the turbulent Mindanao region has resulted in several terrorist attacks linked to ongoing jihadist insurgencies, as well as left-wing extremism, occurring within the city and in its surrounding districts. As of early 2026, the majority of terrorist groups who had previously targeted Davao City have either been neutralized by the authorities or have declared ceasefires with the Philippine government.

== List of militant groups active in Davao City ==
The following militant groups are alleged to have been involved in terrorist related incidents in Davao City and its surrounding areas:

Name	Active regions	Conflicts	Ideology	Motives	Modus Operandi	Notes
Moro Islamic Liberation Front	Mindanao	Moro conflict	Islamism	Independence for the Bangsamoro region	Guerrilla warfare; Urban terrorism; Sabotage	Fought an insurgency from the late 1960's that resulted in thousands of deaths. Announced a permanent ceasefire in 2014.
Abu Sayyaf	Philippines; Malaysia	Moro conflict; War on terror; Siege of Marawi	Islamic Statism; Salafi jihadism	Establish a global Islamic caliphate through armed struggle.	Urban terrorism; Kidnappings; Beheadings	Considered more of a criminal group than a militant organization due to numerous kidnap-for-ransom incidents. Declared as "dismantled" in 2024 by Philippine authorities.
Maute group	Lanao del Sur; Maguindanao del Sur	Siege of Marawi	Salafi jihadism	Establish a global Islamic caliphate through armed struggle.	Urban terrorism; Guerrilla warfare	Composed mostly of former Moro Islamic Liberation Front guerrillas and foreign Jihadists.
Jemaah Islamiyah	Southeast Asia	Moro conflict; War on terror	Salafi jihadism	Establishment of an Islamic state throughout Southeast Asia.	Urban terrorism; Suicide Bombing	Launched numerous attacks within the Philippines as well as training local terrorist groups in bomb making. Disbanded in 2024.
New People's Army	Philippines	New People's Army rebellion	Marxism–Leninism–Maoism	Establishment of a People's Democratic Government through a proletarian revolution	Urban terrorism; Guerrilla warfare; Sabotage	The armed wing of the Communist Party of the Philippines. The entire Davao Region was declared as free of "active NPA influence" in 2025 by Philippine authorities

== List of terrorist related incidents ==
The following is a list of notable terrorist related incidents in Davao City. They are arranged in chronological order.

=== 1980's ===
- 19 April 1981: a grenade attack during Easter Sunday mass at San Pedro Cathedral kills 17 people and injures over 150 others. Two young Marxists suspected of carrying out the attack were later arrested.
- 27 August 1987: the New People's Army attacked the DXMF-AM radio station in Ma-a and the DXRA radio station in Matina Crossing, in an apparent retaliation for broadcasting criticism of group, killing 9 people.

=== 1990's ===
- January 1990: the New People's Army bombs the U.S. Cultural Center in Davao City.
- July 1990: the New People's Army open fire with assault rifles on the U.S. Cultural Center in Davao City during a drive by shooting.
- 27 December 1993: a grenade attack on San Pedro Cathedral kills 6 people and injures over 130 others. A whistleblower later alleges that then Mayor Rodrigo Duterte ordered vigilantes to bomb local mosques in retaliation.
- 17 February 1999: the New People's Army kidnap Philippine Military officers Brigadier general Victor Obillo and Captain Eduardo Montealto on the outskirts of Davao City, and demand the release from prison of Amado Payot (responsible for the Rano massacre) for their safe return.

=== 2000's ===
- 30 September 2000: a New People's Army ambush on a military convoy in Paquibato District kills 4 soldiers and 5 civilians
- 16 May 2002: an explosion at Evergreen Hotel in the room of 67-year-old American citizen Michael Meiring results in him being rushed to hospital and thereafter whisked out of the country by individuals claiming to be American federal agents. Investigations later determined the blast to have been caused by an improvised explosive device.These mysterious circumstances resulted in conspiracy theories that Meiring was responsible for false flag operations that utilized staged terrorist atrocities to destabilize the Mindanao region, with the intent to justify increased military operations against the MILF and thus incentivize an enlarged US military presence in the Philippines during the War on Terror.
- 4 March 2003: the Davao City airport bombing kills 22 people and injures over 100 others, after a suicide bomber attacks the main arrivals hall. Authorities allege the bombing was carried out by Moro Islamic Liberation Front operatives, with the assistance of Jemaah Islamiyah, in retaliation for the death of over 160 MILF members during the Battle of the Buliok Complex a few weeks earlier. A separate explosion was also reported at the Ecoland Bus Terminal in downtown Davao around the same time as the attack on the airport.
- 2 April 2003: an improvised explosive device left under a food stall table kills 17 civilians and injures over 50 others in the Sasa ferry terminal bombing. Authorities believe the same group of MILF and Jemaah Islamiyah members who earlier attacked the airport are responsible, and a senior JI leader named Zulkifli Abdhir was later accused of directing both attacks. In the immediate aftermath of the explosion at Sasa wharf, a series of retaliatory attacks were carried out on mosques throughout Davao City, with grenades and assault rifles being used in several incidents.
- 28 March 2004: the New People's Army launch a large scale attack an army patrol base in Davao City. Two members of the Civilian Active Auxiliary are wounded in the near four-hour gun battle that followed.
- 14 February 2005: a series of coordinated bomb attacks throughout the Philippines, known as the Valentine's Day bombings, result in a 12-year-old boy being killed and 5 other being wounded at the Davao City Overland Transport Terminal in Talomo district. The Abu Sayyaf claimed responsibility for the explosions, calling them a "Valentine's Day gift to Mrs. Arroyo".

=== 2010's ===
- 15 March 2010: a soldier was killed and two others injured after a truck carrying members of the Philippine Army was bombed by the New People's Army while driving through the Paquibato district.
- 29 November 2011: three soldiers from the 69th Infantry Battalion are killed in an I.E.D. attack launched by the New People's Army in Paquibato District
- 19 April 2012: three soldiers are killed and two are wounded in a New People's Army I.E.D. attack on a military convoy in Barangay Marilog.
- 26 August 2012: the New People’s Army launch a pre-dawn attack on the Paquibato base of the Philippine Army's 69th Infantry Battalion, with 5 N.P.A. rebels being killed in the ensuing 90 minute firefight
- 1 September 2012: a hand grenade explosion injures 48 civilians during a circus performance in Paquibato, with the New People's Army later claiming responsibility and clarifying that they were targeting a nearby military detachment when the grenade accidentally bounced off a tarpaulin into the civilian crowd
- 14 December 2012: a Malaysian member of Jemaah Islamiyah, who is subsequently identified as Mohammad Noor Fikrie bin Abdul Kahar from Kedah, is shot dead by a S.W.A.T team sniper outside the Apo View Hotel in Poblacion District, after he had threatened to detonate an I.E.D. made from a 60-millimeter mortar round when confronted by police.
- 17 June 2013: five soldiers are kidnapped after being captured at a New People's Army checkpoint in Paquibato District. They are held captive for 45 days before being released unconditionally after appeals from their families
- 17 September 2013: movie theaters at the SM City mall and the Gaisano Mall are bombed 22 minutes apart from each other, resulting in five people being taken to hospital with minor injuries. Investigations determined the explosive devices were crudely made from gunpowder packed into aluminum cans of Diet Pepsi and were designed to intimidate rather than cause serious injury, while authorities revealed that the US Embassy in Manila had warned American-owned businesses in southern Mindanao to be on alert for potential terrorist attacks a few days previously
- 28 January 2015: the New People's Army rebels killed a soldier of the 69th Infantry Battalion during an ambush in the Paquibato district.
- 25 April 2015: New People’s Army rebels attack government forces in Paquibato District, and the following morning the 84th Infantry Battalion engaged in follow up operations in Toril District are ambushed by the NPA, resulting in four soldiers being wounded and one NPA rebel being killed
- 28 June 2015: a senior New People’s Army’s commander Leoncio Pitao (a.k.a. Commander Parago) is killed during a firefight with Scout Ranger commandos in the Panalum Village area of Paquibato District
- 22 September 2015: Abu Sayyaf militants kidnap four people at gunpoint from the Holiday Oceanview Marina resort on the northern tip of Samal Island. They were later taken to Sulu, where two hostages (Canadian's Robert Hall and John Ridsdel) are eventually beheaded after the group's ransom demands (300 million Philippine pesos per hostage) were not met.
- 18 November 2015: an I.E.D. made from a 60-millimeter mortar round explodes inside a mini bus near SM City Davao mall, causing minor injuries to two people
- 17 April 2016: the New People's Army attack an army base in Paquibato District and raid its armoury for weapons, five policemen sent to investigate are subsequently take captive by the group
- 2 September 2016: an I.E.D. explosion causes 15 deaths and 70 injuries during the Roxas Night Market attack. The I.E.D. consisted of a mortar shell fitted with a remote detonator, similar to the device used in the 2005 Valentine's Day bombings. Authorities blamed the Maute group for the atrocity, and efforts to apprehend the group's leadership would result in the Siege of Marawi the following year.
- 16 February 2017: 2 soldiers are killed and 15 others were wounded in Calinan district after the New People's Army detonated a landmine under a convoy of military vehicles, with 2 NPA rebels being killed in the ensuing firefight.
- 11 June 2017: the New People's Army ambush a patrol from the 16th Infantry Battalion in Paquibato District, resulting in 2 soldiers being killed and 6 others wounded
- 13 January 2018: three agricultural vehicles belonging to Sumitumo Fruits Corp are hijacked by the New People's Army, in apparent revenge for the Japanese banana firm not paying extortion demands
- 25 January 2018: the New People's Army killed First lieutenant Jarren Jay Relota and wounded 2 other soldiers from the 16th Infantry Battalion during an ambush in Paquibato district.
- 1 April 2018: the New People's Army destroyed 10 vehicles belonging to construction companies in three districts of Davao City, after they had refused to pay a "revolutionary tax" to the group.
- 27 June 2018: two soldiers from the Philippine Army’s 3rd Infantry Battalion are wounded during a two hour long firefight with a platoon of New People's Army in Baguio District, with the dead bodies of two NPA rebels being recovered in the aftermath
- 23 March 2019: troops from the Philippine Army’s 3rd Infantry Battalion come under fire while patrolling Baguio District, with one member of the New People's Army being killed by the soldiers' suppressive fire

=== 2020's ===
- 22 April 2020: the New People's Army detonate an I.E.D. in Paquibato district as a Philippine Army foot patrol attempt to secure Barangay Malabog in advance of Social Welfare cash distribution, resulting in two soldiers being wounded
- 9 September 2020: the Philippine Army’s 27th Infantry Battalion are ambushed by the New People's Army in Calinan District, with the ensuing gunbattle resulting in 2 NPA rebels being killed and another seriously wounded
- 24 March 2022: Davao City is officially declared "insurgency-free" by Major General Nolasco Mempin of the Philippine Army's 10th Infantry Division due to the mass surrendering of New People's Army rebels after 12 of the top ranking leaders of the N.P.A's Southern Mindanao Regional Committee were captured in Kitaotao in January 2022
- 15 June 2023: a booby-trap bomb planted under an SUV in front of the Magulta law office on Ecoland Drive explodes causing no injuries

== See also ==
- Terrorism in the Philippines
- List of terrorist incidents in the Philippines
- Insurgency in the Philippines
- Philippines–United States relations
