= Proclamation No. 55 =

2016 Philippine state of emergency declaration after the Davao City bombing

- Long title: Declaring a State of National Emergency on Account of Lawless Violence in Mindanao
- Citation: Proclamation No. 55, s. 2016
- Territorial extent: Philippines
- Signed by: Rodrigo Duterte
- Signed: September 4, 2016
- Repealed: July 25, 2023

Repealed by
- Proclamation No. 298, s. 2023; Lifting the State of National Emergency on Account of Lawless Violence in Mindanao

Keywords
- state of emergency, terrorism
- Status: Repealed

Proclamation No. 55 was signed by Philippine President Rodrigo Duterte on September 4, 2016, to officially declare a state of emergency in the Philippines in response to the 2016 Davao City bombing.

== History ==
Following the September 2 bombing in Davao City that killed 14 people and seriously wounded at least 60 others, President Duterte placed the entire country under a national state of emergency. By virtue of the proclamation declaring a "State of National Emergency on Account of Lawless Violence in Mindanao", the Armed Forces of the Philippines (AFP) and the Philippine National Police (PNP) were ordered to suppress all forms of lawless violence in Mindanao and to undertake measures to prevent violence from spreading to other parts of the Philippines. The proclamation also came on the heels of the Philippine military offensive against the terrorist group Abu Sayyaf in Patikul, Sulu which left 15 soldiers dead on August 29, 2016. It also acknowledged the threats of further terror attacks by lawless elements in other parts of the country, including the metropolitan areas, following these developments in Mindanao.

President Duterte issued the proclamation in Manila just before leaving for Laos to attend the 2016 ASEAN Summit. Earlier, he verbally declared a "state of lawlessness" in the country on September 3, 2016. In a press conference in Davao the day following the attacks, Duterte said the declaration was to "ensure coordinated efforts" between the police and the military in the government's fight against illegal drugs, criminals and terrorism. He also said it was not a declaration of martial law and that the writ of habeas corpus will not be suspended.

The presidential proclamation orders the Philippine law enforcement officials to carry out suppression of violence "as may be permitted in the Constitution and existing laws," as well as "with due regard to the fundamental civil and political rights of our citizens." It also states that the "state of national emergency on account of lawless violence shall remain in force and effect until lifted or withdrawn by the President."

=== Repeal ===
On July 25, 2023, Duterte's successor, President Bongbong Marcos, issued Proclamation No. 298 which was also signed by Executive Secretary Lucas Bersamin. This repealed Proclamation No. 55, s. 2016, thus lifting the state of national emergency. It was said that the conditions that prompted such status had been "significantly mitigated or reduced;" and the lifting would strengthen economic activity and speed up the recovery of the local economy.

== Directives ==
Under Memorandum Order No. 3 released on September 7, 2016, the Department of National Defense and the Department of the Interior and Local Government are ordered to deploy additional forces of the AFP and PNP in public areas throughout the country without causing undue alarm to the general public, and to intensify their local and transnational intelligence operations against individuals or groups suspected of, or responsible for, committing or conspiring to commit acts of lawless violence. It also orders the Department of Justice to coordinate with law enforcement agencies for the prompt investigation and prosecution of all suspected individuals or groups.

The memorandum guarantees the civil and political rights of individuals in the duration of the state of emergency and sets out the rules governing arrests for AFP and PNP personnel. It states:

No warrantless arrests shall be effected unless the situation falls under any of the following circumstances, among others:

(i) when the person to be arrested has committed, is actually committing, or is attempting to commit an offense in the presence of the arresting officer;

(ii) when an offense has just been committed and the arresting officer has personal knowledge of facts indicating that the person to be arrested has committed the offense;

(iii) when the person to be arrested is a prisoner who escaped from a penal establishment or place where he is serving final judgment or temporarily confined with his case is pending;

(iv) when the person arrested, or to be arrested, has voluntarily waived his rights against warrantless arrests.

— M.O. 3 sec. 5

The memorandum also lists the existing rules and procedures in carrying out warrantless searches and seizures, such as when the individual consents to the search or waives his right against warrantless search; when the search is made contemporaneous to a lawful arrest; the search of vessels and aircraft for violation of immigration and customs laws; the search of automobiles at borders for violation of immigration or smuggling laws; the seizure of objects made in plain view; stop-and-frisk situations; and searches arising from emergency circumstances.

Military and police checkpoint inspections shall be limited to requesting to roll down vehicle windows to search for objects in plain view only, and the production of identification and vehicle registration papers. The memorandum also states:

Any AFP/PNP personnel found violating any of the foregoing constitutional rights shall be held administratively and civilly/criminally liable therefor.

— M.O. 3 sec. 6

== See also ==
- 2006 state of emergency in the Philippines
- Proclamation No. 216
