= 2016 Davao City bombing =

Terrorist attack in the Philippines

- Part of the Moro conflict
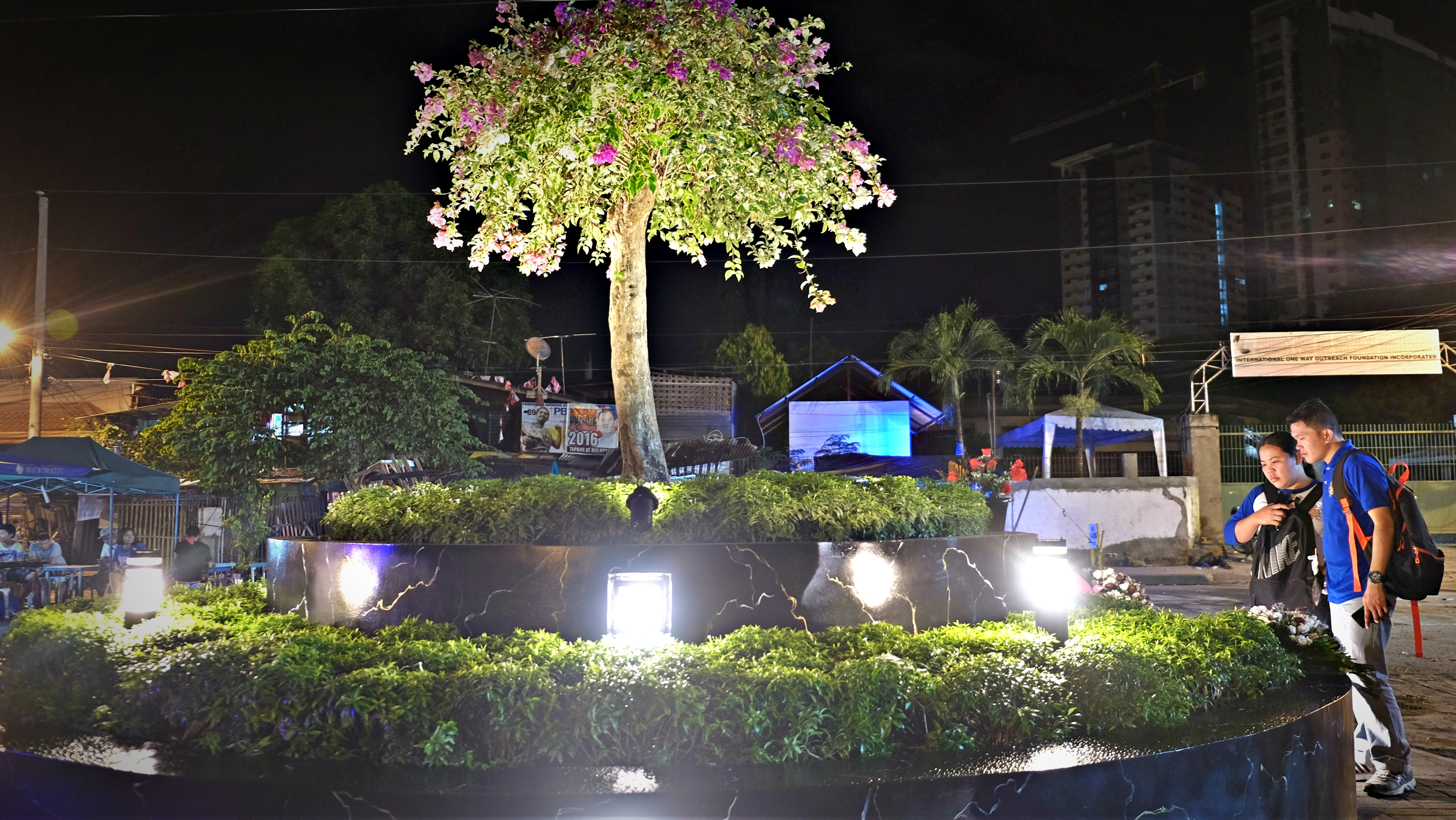
- Memorial unveiled dedicated to the victims of the bombing.

- Davao City (Mindanao mainland)
- Location: 7.07194°N 125.61216°E; Roxas Night Market, Roxas Avenue, Davao City, Philippines
- Date: September 2, 2016; 22:17 (PST)
- Target: Civilians
- Attack type: Bombings
- Weapon: Improvised explosive device
- Deaths: 15
- Injuries: 70
- Perpetrator: (Islamic State) Maute Group
- Motive: Islamic terrorism

A bombing at the Roxas Night Market occurred in Davao City, Philippines, on September 2, 2016, causing at least 14 deaths and 70 injuries. On September 13, 2016, one of those injured, a pregnant woman, died, bringing the death toll up to 15.

Militant Islamic group Abu Sayyaf reportedly claimed responsibility for the bombing but later denied responsibility, claiming that their allies, the Daulat Ul-Islamiya, were responsible for the incident as a show of sympathy to the group. Disgruntled vendors are also being considered as possible perpetrators.

On October 2, 2016, three of the ten suspects were arrested. The arrested are linked to the Maute group which has ties with the Abu Sayyaf.

== Background ==
On August 28, 2016, President Rodrigo Duterte ordered the Armed Forces of the Philippines to capture and eliminate Abu Sayyaf members, after the group beheaded an 18-year-old boy on August 22, 2016, after the victim's family failed to pay ransom.

On July 7, 2016, Davao City Vice Mayor Paolo Duterte announced that the city was facing threats from Islamic State, prompting authorities to increase security in the area. He however got criticized for such announcement. After the night market bombing, Duterte admitted he received a bomb threat two days before the incident stating that an attack will occur either in General Santos or Davao City, but opted not to inform the public per the message's instructions.

Davao City Mayor Sara Duterte had previously ordered the popular night market to be closed due to "a number of violations and complaints". It however reopened on August 13 following meetings with the vendors and provided that all vendors follow stricter rules set by the city government.

== Attacks ==
The bombing took place around 22:17 PST at the night market, which is located along Roxas Avenue in the city's central business district, some 100 meters from the main campus of the Ateneo de Davao University.

At the Command Conference of the Police Region Office 11 in Davao the night following the incident, Philippine National Police Director General Ronald dela Rosa confirmed that the Davao blast was a terror attack and that an improvised explosive device was used.

== Suspected perpetrators ==
Abu Sayyaf, through its spokesman, reportedly claimed responsibility for the alleged bombing as it called on the mujahideen in the country to unite against the Armed Forces of the Philippines. The group later denied the reports by saying that it was their allies, the Daulat Ul-Islamiya responsible for the explosion saying that the Daulat's actions was to sympathize with Abu Sayyaf. Its spokesman said that the attacks will not stop unless President Rodrigo Duterte adopted the hadith as law of the country and he himself seek convert to Islam.

Before the attack, the group reportedly vowed retaliation against the Philippine government for launching a major offensive against it recently in Sulu.

The Davao City Government offered a 3 million peso-reward for the eventual arrest of the perpetrators. Two million pesos was to be given for those who can give information on the whereabouts of the bombing suspects, while another 1 million pesos was to be given for those who can arrest and bring the suspects to the authorities.

=== Individuals ===
The Philippine National Police's investigation remarked the similarities of the IED used in the bombing of the night market at the 2005 Valentine's Day bombings. Like in 2005, the 2016 bombings used an IED composed of a mortar shell fitted with a remote detonator. This finding caused the police to suspect that Abdul Manap Mentang, who was suspected on responsibility for the 2005 blasts, may be directly involved in the 2016 bombings.

As of 5 September, the PNP had three "persons of interest" in connection with the bombings based from testimonies from witnesses. One of them was a medium-built male in his 40s who was seen leaving a bag under a massage table. The two other persons of interest are female.

On October 4, 2016, three men who are linked to the Maute group were arrested through the joint efforts of the police and military and were presented to the media on October 7. They were identified as TJ Tagadaya Macabalang, Wendel Apostol Facturan, and Musali Mustapha. Defense Secretary Delfin Lorenzana said that the Maute Group had already established links with Abu Sayyaf and that there are "indications" that the group is aligning themselves with Islamic State. Seven other suspects remain at large.

== Convictions ==
On September 29, 2020, the Regional trial court of Taguig convicted 11 men for the murder of 15 people and the attempted murder of 69 others during the Roxas night market bombing of 2016. Seven of the arrested bombers (TJ Macabalang, Wendel Facturan, Musali Mustapha, Jessy Vincent Original, Zack Haron Lopez, Jackson Usi and Ausa Abdullah Mamasapano) were in custody when the verdict was handed down by Judge Marivic Vitor, while four other co-accused (Abubakar Zulkipli, Datu Masla Sema, Mohammad Abdul Jabbar Sema and Pendatun Coy Maruhom) were convicted in absentia. All eleven were sentenced to reclusión perpetua, with a minimum term of 20 years in prison, and ordered to compensate the families of the dead victims P350,000 each and P150,000 to each of the injured survivors of the bombings.

== Reactions ==
=== Domestic ===
==== Government ====
The Philippine National Police placed all of its units nationwide under full alert following the attack while the Davao City Police Office has also set up a hotline specifically for use of the victims' relatives.

President Rodrigo Duterte declared a "state of emergency on account of lawless violence" in the Philippines as the entirety of Davao City was placed on lockdown. Under the declaration, the Armed Forces of the Philippines are given the authority to conduct law enforcement operations normally done by the Philippine National Police, but unlike martial law, the writ of habeas corpus is not suspended. While no nationwide curfew has been imposed, residents were advised to stay indoors as police and soldiers set up checkpoints and searched vehicles and houses. Duterte also postponed a scheduled state visit to Brunei scheduled on 4 to 5 September.

==== Non-state parties ====
On September 4, 2016, the Communist Party of the Philippines accused the United States of instigating the bomb attack. In a statement, Siegfried Red of the CPP's Southern Mindanao Regional Party Committee claimed that the US planned the bombing to derail the peace talks between the party and the Duterte administration. The communist group has accused the Central Intelligence Agency in particular with collaborating with critics of the peace talks, ultra-rightists groups linked to the Armed Forces of the Philippines, and drug lords.

=== International ===
==== Countries ====
The United States, through the US National Security Council expressed readiness to coordinate with local authorities regarding the investigation of the incident and offered condolences to the relatives of the victims of the blast. Australia, Brunei, Cambodia, China, France, Indonesia, Japan, Malaysia, Singapore, South Korea, Spain and Vietnam also expressed their condolences and condemning the attack. Similarly, Israel, through their embassy in the country expressed condolences to the victims and wished a speedy recovery to the injured.

The governments of Canada, China, Singapore, Taiwan, the United Kingdom and the United States issued travel warnings to its citizens, while Australia reiterated its travel warning in the area.

==== Others ====
Amnesty International acknowledged the tragedy and extended its condolences to the victims.

Facebook activated its Safety Check feature hours after the bombing.

== Other bombings ==
Two separate bomb attacks struck Carmen, Cotabato and Polomolok, South Cotabato on September 3.

== Impact ==
The Miss Universe 2016 pageant which was originally scheduled to be hosted in the Philippines on December 12, 2016, was delayed by the Miss Universe organization to January 30, 2017, due to "security reasons".

== See also ==
- Terrorism in Davao City
- Crimes committed by the Abu Sayyaf network
- List of terrorist incidents in September 2016
- Terrorism in the Philippines
