= Poblacion, Davao City =

District in Davao City, Philippines

Coordinates: 7°03′51″N 125°36′33″E

Poblacion
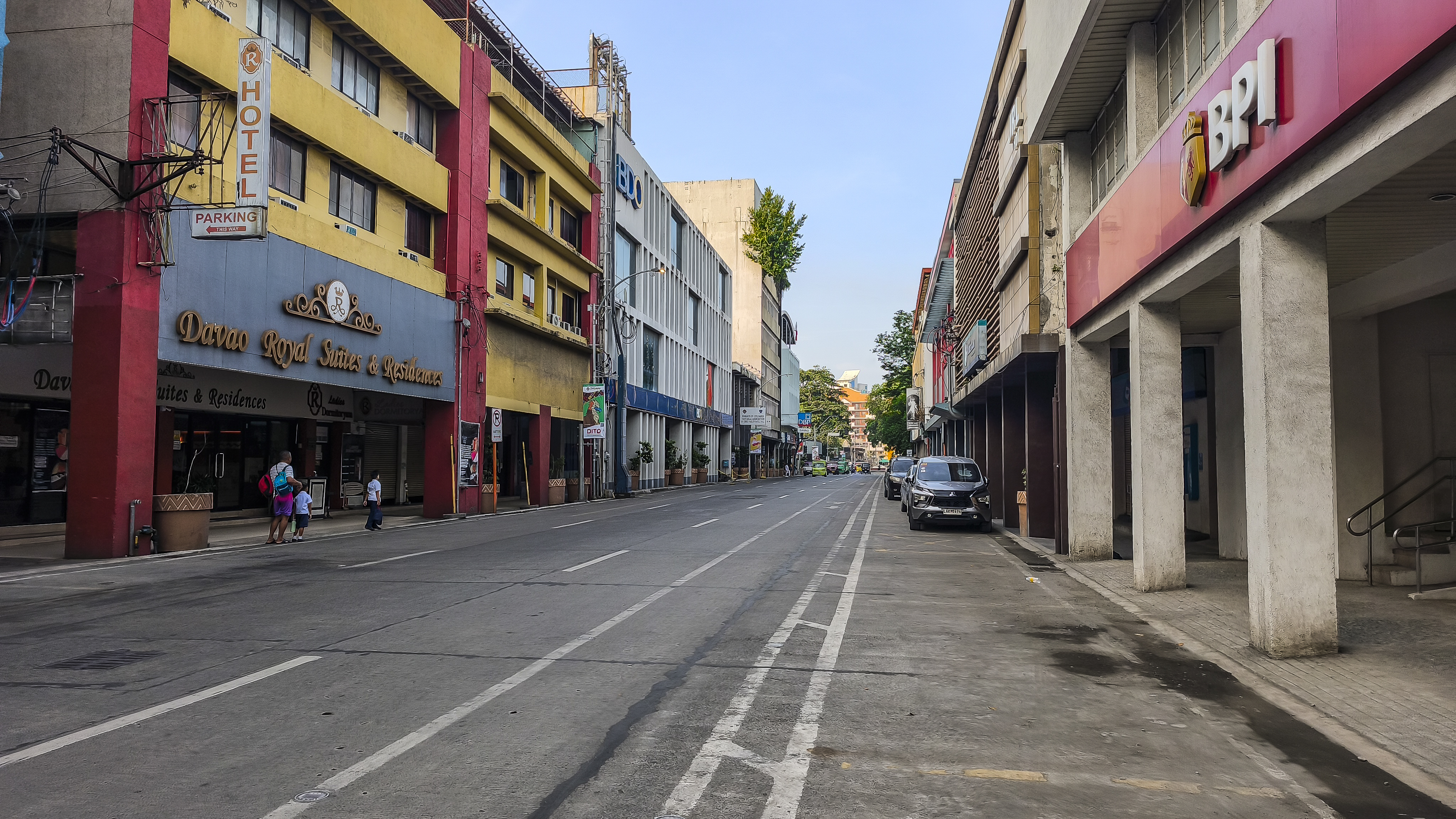
- CM Recto Street

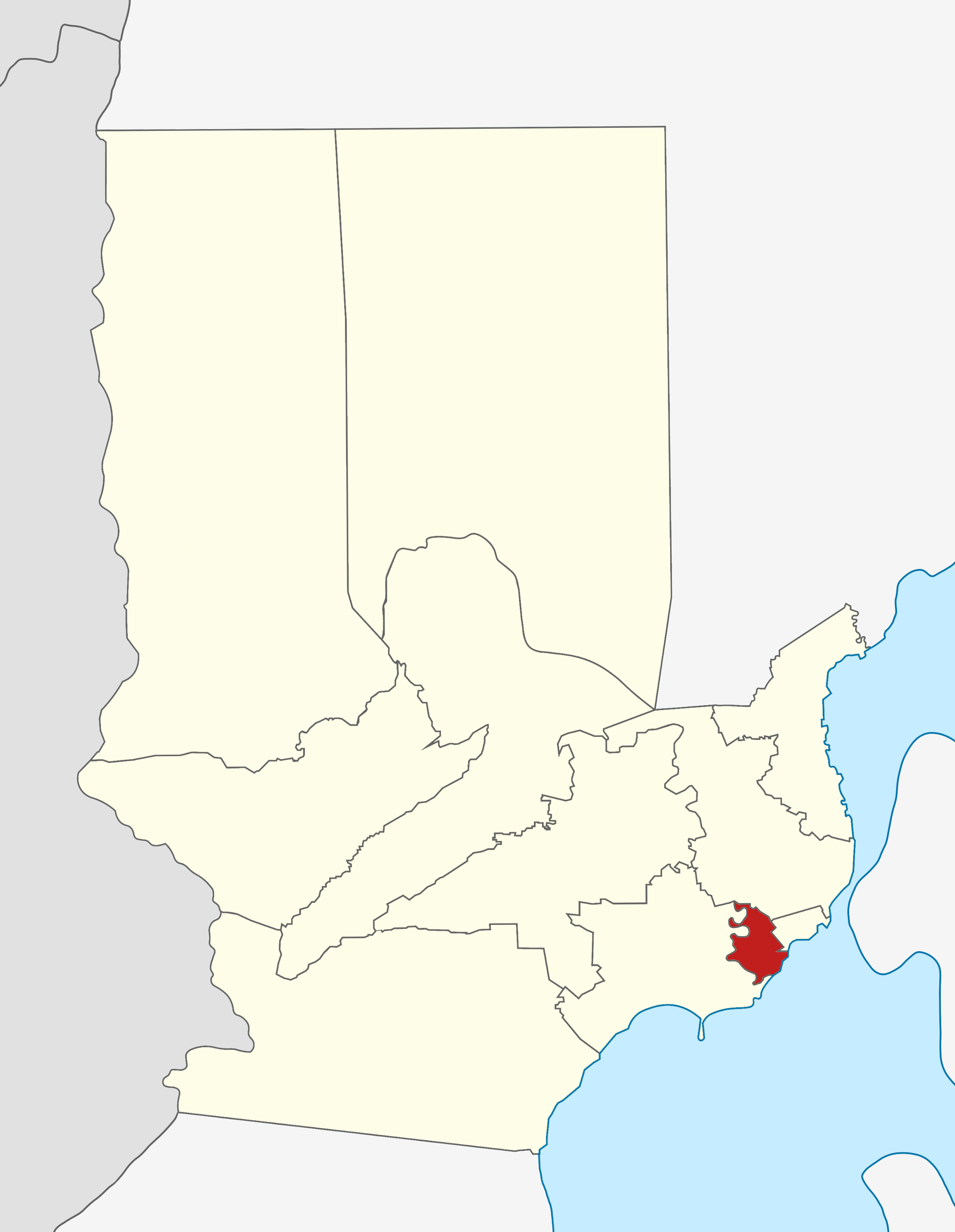
- Location of Poblacion District in Davao City.
- Country: Philippines
- Region: Region XI
- Province: Davao del Sur (geographically only)
- City: Davao City

Population (2020 census)
  - Total: 173,896
- Time zone: UTC+08:00 (Philippine Standard Time)

Poblacion is an administrative district of Davao City in the Philippines. In 2020, Poblacion had a population of 173,896. It is situated in the 1st congressional district of Davao City.

== Geography ==
Poblacion is a district that borders the districts of Talomo, Buhangin and Agdao.

== Culture and Attractions ==
Poblacion District is a buzzing mix of businesses and hotels with People's Park at its heart, a sculpture-filled green space popular for jogging and picnics. In the district also located the Ramon Magsaysay Park. Kadayawan Village showcases Davao's indigenous culture through traditional architecture and performances, while displays at the D’ Bone Collector Museum include a sperm whale skeleton. Street food stalls pack busy Roxas Night Market.

== Barangays ==
Poblacion District is politically subdivided into 40 barangays. Each barangay consists of puroks.

- 1-A
- 2-A
- 3-A
- 4-A
- 5-A
- 6-A
- 7-A
- 8-A
- 9-A
- 10-A
- 11-B
- 12-B
- 13-B
- 14-B
- 15-B
- 16-B
- 17-B
- 18-B
- 19-B
- 20-B
- 21-C
- 22-C
- 23-C
- 24-C
- 25-C
- 26-C
- 27-C
- 28-C
- 29-C
- 30-C
- 31-D
- 32-D
- 33-D
- 34-D
- 35-D
- 36-D
- 37-D
- 38-D
- 39-D
- 40-D
