= Oakwood mutiny =

2003 military incident in the Philippines

Date	July 27, 2003
Location	Makati, Metro Manila, Philippines 14.5515°N 121.0263°E
Result	Philippine government victory

Belligerents
Government of the Philippines	Magdalo Group

Commanders and leaders
(Philippines) Narciso Abaya (Philippines) Hermogenes Ebdane	Gerardo Gambala; Antonio Trillanes IV; Nicanor Faeldon

Military support
Armed Forces of the Philippines; Philippine National Police	c. 300 defectors from the Armed Forces of the Philippines and Philippine National Police
- Location within Metro Manila

On July 27, 2003, the Oakwood mutiny was led by a group of about 300 armed defectors from the Armed Forces of the Philippines (AFP) and the Philippine National Police (PNP) led by Army Capt. Gerardo Gambala and Navy Lt. Senior Grade Antonio Trillanes IV against the Arroyo administration. The group forcibly seized and occupied Oakwood Premier Ayala Center, an apartment complex in Glorietta, Makati, for almost 20 hours. They expressed grievances against the government's supervision of the military, and demanded the resignation of Defense Secretary Angelo Reyes, PNP Chief Hermogenes Ebdane, and AFP Chief of Intelligence Service Victor Corpus; they also aired their grievances against the military establishment and anomalies on the AFP. The mutiny was covered heavily by the local press, with ABS-CBN News writer Joel Saracho dubbing the group "Magdalo" in reference to their insignia, mistakenly assuming it referred to the Magdalo faction of the Katipunan during the Philippine Revolution, despite the group officially calling themselves "Bagong Katipuneros" (transl. New Katipuneros). The mutiny ended after the government successfully negotiated with the group. Several prominent participants of the mutiny, including Trillanes and Gambala, were later charged.

An official investigation was launched afterwards. A final report released in October of the same year identified the mutiny leaders, as well as underscoring the need for the modernization of the AFP. While detained, Trillanes wrote a thesis in 2004 on how to prevent future military interventions based on his analysis of Arroyo administration policies. He later ran and won a seat for senator in the 2007 elections under the Genuine Opposition coalition, despite being in prison. He attempted another mutiny against Arroyo in 2007, but it also failed. He was later released in 2010 following an executive order issued by Arroyo. Meanwhile, Gambala and eight other rebel officials were later given a presidential pardon in 2008 upon their admission of guilt. They were discharged from military service after pleading guilty on the military tribunal.

== Background ==
=== The Fact-Finding Commission ===
According to the report of the post-mortem Fact Finding Commission chaired by Florentino P. Feliciano, a retired Supreme Court justice, "the incidents leading to the mutiny were not spontaneous, but a mere alternative plan to an overarching plot to overthrow the government". The finding disproved the initial claim made by Trillanes before the commission that the forceful occupation of the Oakwood Service Apartments by the Magdalo Group was "unplanned and spontaneous".

Further findings gathered by the commission revealed that extensive planning and preparations for several months had preceded the events of July 27, 2003. "Gripe sessions" were held among military personnel sought to be recruited, which included the dissemination and discussion of copies of the "National Recovery Program" (NRP) authored by Col. Gregorio Honasan (retired), and a document entitled "The Last Revolution". Bloodletting meetings and the taking of an "Oath of Loyalty" by the recruits were conducted. The purchase of flags, armbands, uniforms, backpacks and other rebel paraphernalia, including telecommunications equipment and vehicles were also taking place.

A photograph taken in one of these meetings, which was released to the press by the Presidential Security Group (PSG), showed Trillanes and a person believed to be Honasan standing before the Philippine flag and a flag or streamer with the Magdalo countersign.

From July to December 2002, word began to spread about military personnel who were disseminating spurious queries about grievances within the Armed Forces of the Philippines (AFP). Reports were leaked involving the Reform the Armed Forces Movement (RAM), constituted by maverick junior officers and discontented enlisted personnel. These reports were submitted to Brig. Gen. Victor Corpus, confirmed by a later investigation that secret meetings were taking place among the insurgents; being held in Metro Manila, Central Luzon, and Mindanao.

Meetings reportedly took place in the Robinsons Galleria Suites in Ortigas Center, Pasig, Metro Manila, on June 4, 2003, and a "Blood Compact" ritual among the RAM recruits on June 12, 2003, in a safehouse located in San Juan, Metro Manila, allegedly presided over by Gregorio Honasan. In the meeting, Honasan discussed his NRP agenda and “The Last Revolution”, concluding that "the only means to achieve that platform or vision is through the use of force, violence, or armed struggle". The bloodletting rite was administered to those who membership in the "Magdalo" group. To carry out the bloodletting rite, Honasan provided special knives and showed the participants how to inscribe the letter “ᜃ” (Unicode 1703) or "Ka" of the Old Tagalog alphabet under their left upper arms.

In the June 12 meeting in San Juan, the following topics were discussed: the peace and order situation, the national economy, the alleged illegitimacy of the Arroyo administration, the Joseph Estrada plunder case, and the military's purported need to rectify the supposed errors brought about by the consequence of EDSA 2. It was during this meeting that Army Maj. Perfecto Ragil, a member of the AFP Electronics and Information Systems Services assigned to Malacañang Palace, was tasked by Marine Capt. Gary Alejano to disable the palace's telephone system on "D-Day".

=== Intelligence reports ===
Based on intelligence reports, two documents of dubious origin were distributed during the meeting in San Juan. These documents were "designed to pollute the minds of the junior officers". The first was a supposed Memorandum of Instructions addressed to the Secretary of National Defense dated February 11, 2003, directing the full implementation of "Oplan Greenbase".

The document, purportedly signed by President Gloria Macapagal Arroyo, contained a plan to capture Hashim Salamat dead or alive and to occupy the Buliok Complex at the Liguasan Marsh area in Cotabato. Secretary Eduardo Ermita of the Office of the Presidential Adviser on the Peace Process (OPAPP) purportedly signed the other document entitled "The President' s Four-Point Policy Framework in Addressing the Southern Philippines Secessionist/MILF Problem", allegedly pursuant to the February 11 Presidential Memorandum of Instructions. This latter document purports to show that "there is apparently a plan by the government to hold the MILF responsible for AFP-backed bombings in urban areas in Mindanao". President Arroyo denied having issued the first memorandum, and Ermita denounced the second document as being spurious and fabricated.

The meeting on the night of June 12 was reportedly attended by top RAM officers including Honasan and retired Navy Capt. Felix Turingan, and the rebel leaders Trillanes, Gambala, and other junior officers. The group planned to attack high impact targets such as the Malacañang Palace, Ninoy Aquino International Airport, Fort Bonifacio, Camp Crame, Villamor Air Base, Camp Aguinaldo, and all television and radio stations in Metro Manila.

The plotters underwent the ritual earlier described as bloodletting, which they termed "dinuguan". Apart from the gripe sessions and bloodletting rites, the Magdalo group’s preparations included the acquisition of rebel paraphernalia. On June 4, 2003, a male customer went to the International Flag House (IFH) in Manila and placed a job order for 100 pieces each of Philippine flags and Aguinaldo flags (i.e., displaying the Magdalo symbol). He deposited ₱1,000.00 (equivalent to ₱1,974 in 2021) for the job order, the total cost of which was ₱24,000.00 (equivalent to ₱47,379 in 2021). The customer wrote his name on Job Order 2186 as Armand Pontejos and his telephone number as 456-3222.

Subsequent additional orders were placed for more flags, which orders raised the total cost to P45,000.00. The customer was later identified as Navy Ensign Armand Pontejos, PMA '00, one of the rebel soldiers who went to Oakwood.

Another rebel soldier who went to Oakwood was Navy Lt. Manuel Cabochan, of PMA '95 who bought 49 sets of battle dress attire (BDA) uniforms, T-shirts, and combat boots worth ₱108,780.00 (equivalent to ₱214,743 in 2021) on June 30, 2003.

There is evidence the Magdalo group also acquired vehicles apparently to transport troops to target areas. On July 23, five Hyundai Aero buses (presumably second hand) were purchased for ₱2.10 million in cash by Francisco Dimaculangan and Isidro Samaco from a company named Car Option Sales, Inc.

One bus was later found in Oakwood while another was abandoned in Binakayan, Kawit, Cavite. There is also evidence that some communications equipment used by the rebel soldiers were of the same specifications as those proposed to be acquired under the AFP Modernization Act. It was established that such equipment was not taken from any known or existing inventory of the AFP.

The Magdalo group, it appears, targeted Oakwood as the site for the execution of "Plan Charlie". On July 19, Gambala checked in at Oakwood under the name of George Uy, coincidentally the same name as SOUTHCOM Admiral George Uy. A cash deposit of ₱48,800.00 (equivalent to ₱96,336 in 2021) for room rental from July 19 to 28, 2003 was paid by someone calling herself Tina Uy Angeles, who made the reservation.

== Discovery of the plot ==
From July 21 to 23, unauthorized troop movements apparently bound for Manila had been monitored upon validation of the information that there was restiveness among junior AFP officers.

Having validated the coup rumors and considering the troop movements, the government took a number of pre-emptive measures. It was fortuitous that these rumors and troop movements materialized just prior to President Arroyo's State of the Nation Address (SONA) scheduled for delivery on July 28. In connection with the SONA, the government was already taking measures to ensure the security of the president and the government. On July 10, the National Security Council (NSC) had requested the National Intelligence Coordinating Agency (NICA) to host a "small group" meeting of the Special Monitoring Committee Alpha (SMC Alpha), which was organized to ensure security during the SONA, together with the major service intelligence chiefs of the AFP and counter-intelligence specialists.

SMC Alpha is composed of representatives from various intelligence bodies, and is mandated to monitor domestic threats, particularly destabilization plots against the government, and to recommend appropriate counterintelligence measures. Its task is to prevent mass mobilizations from turning into a situation similar to the attempted siege of Malacañang Palace on May 1, 2001, by the supporters of former President Joseph Estrada.

At the SMC Alpha meeting held on July 11, the details of the recruitment by the Magdalo group were discussed and those involved were identified. On the same day, NICA Director General Cesar Garcia reported to National Security Adviser Roilo Golez on the ongoing recruitment activities in the AFP by certain junior officers. Subsequently, SMC Alpha submitted a report from various intelligence sources that the plot being watched involved plans to temporarily reinstate deposed President Estrada.

On July 12, the intelligence group informed President Arroyo about persistent reports of rebel recruitment activities in the AFP and the Philippine National Police (PNP), particularly in Mindanao, Central Luzon, and Metro Manila. The Deputy Chief of Staff for Intelligence (J2), MGen. Pedro Cabuay, presented a summary of what was taken up at NICA the previous day. Considering its highly sensitive nature, the information was kept within a small group. Apart from the top officers of the AFP and the PNP, only a small number of Cabinet members attended. Recruitment efforts were noted to be most intense in the 1st Scout Ranger Regiment and Special Forces Regiment of the Special Operations Command, the Philippine Navy (SWAG), Fort Bonifacio Units, the Philippine Army’s Light Armor Brigade (LABDE) and the Anti-Crime Task Force (ACTAF). Most of those who were approached were junior officers from the PMA classes of ’95 thru ’99. Considering the situation as having developed into a crisis, the President immediately designated Golez as crisis manager. An action plan was approved which consisted of pre-emptive measures employing persuasion efforts on the one hand, and cracking down on the suspected plotters should they commit any overt illegal acts, on the other.

Recruitment activities by suspected rebels were again reported during the July 14 meeting of the Cabinet Oversight Committee – Internal Security (COC-IS). The meeting discussed threats to SONA and the concomitant security preparations. At this time, the Government had not yet established concrete links between the recruitment of military officers as rebels and the anti-government mass actions mobilized for the SONA. In the meeting of SMC Alpha on July 15, the recruitment had been reported as led by a covert fraternity called the “New Filipino Heroes” who were advocating the adoption of the NRP of Honasan. Plans of the groups to rescue and release former President Estrada from the Veterans Memorial Medical Center (VMMC) and to take over radio and television stations were likewise revealed. Another meeting by the SMC Alpha took place on July 18 to ensure that the action plans agreed upon were already in place and being implemented.

Having received reports about the troop movements, PNP Chief and Director General Hermogenes Ebdane, Jr. issued a directive to all field commanders to coordinate with AFP units and investigate any unauthorized movements and other groupings. He also ordered all PNP personnel to be accounted for, and declared a full alert status for the PNP National Headquarters in Camp Crame, effective 6:00 pm on July 22, 2003. There was also an order to reinforce the guards at Camp Crame.

It further appears that the intelligence community had been receiving reports that Honasan had been holding sessions with the members of the Magdalo group in Metro Manila and Sangley Point, Cavite. Information on these sessions was shared during the preparation for President Arroyo’ s SONA. At the meeting on July 23, the SMC Alpha discussed plans on how to counter the likely staging of mass actions by anti-government groups at the Batasang Pambansa Complex during the SONA. At this meeting, the efforts at recruitment of junior officers in the AFP and the PNP in Mindanao were reported. The February 11 Memorandum of Instructions to the DND Secretary purportedly issued by the president and the “Oplan Greenbase” attributed to Ermita were reported to have been disseminated to bolster the recruitment effort.

Troop movements actually occurred two days before the Oakwood incident. Some 47 marines, carrying firearms were sighted coming from Ternate, Cavite. In the early morning of July 25, Some 28 Scout Ranger personnel boarded a Cebu Pacific flight for Manila and were monitored to have proceeded to Virramall Shopping Center in Greenhills, San Juan. On the same day several Scout Rangers were also reported surveying the Makati business district. Moreover, a group of Scout Rangers and members of the Philippine Marines boarded Superferry 2 from Zamboanga City for Manila via Iloilo City. The troop movement was being monitored and it was decided that the soldiers be met once they arrive in North Harbor. Upon their arrival, they were in fact met by some officers, including Col. Danilo Lim of the First Scout Ranger Regiment (FSRR), and were found to have apparently legitimate reasons for coming to Manila. They carried documents showing either they were on rest and recreation or about to undergo training. Despite the coup rumors, government security forces refrained from taking punitive action against the junior officers at that time as nothing overtly illegal had been committed. Some of them came in BDA uniforms and carried arms and ammunition. Some of them ended up in Oakwood.

Before the Oakwood incident, amid the coup rumors, Arroyo met with officers and men, including Trillanes and some members of PMA '94 and '95. On July 10, Navy Lt. Christopher Magdangal, an aide-de-camp to Arroyo and a member of PMA '95, called his classmate Trillanes to ask him about the veracity of reports that the latter was a leader of a rebel group moving to destabilize the government. Trillanes said he was surprised to hear such report and later confided to Magdangal, after several exchanges of text and cellular phone messages, that he was in fact receiving death threats over the phone. Trillanes then asked Magdangal if he could meet Arroyo in Malacañang on July 13 to clarify the issue with her.

Trillanes, who would later act as spokesman of the Magdalo group, met with two members of the PSG, Col. Delfin Bangit and Magdangal in the early morning of July 13. They talked for nearly four hours from 3:00 am onwards. The two officers were present when Trillanes met with President Arroyo at 7:00 am of the same day. During the meeting with Arroyo, Trillanes brought up the problem of corruption as discussed in the two term papers which he submitted for his masters program at the University of the Philippines’ National College of Public Administration and Governance. He later alleged that Arroyo did not give him a chance to discuss the papers and instead scolded him. Arroyo allegedly ordered the PSG officers to parade him before the media to give him a lesson and called the Flag Officer-in-Command (FOIC), Vice Admiral Ernesto de Leon, to detain him at the Naval Intelligence and Security Force (NISF) in Fort Bonifacio. In this connection, Magdangal, testified that, to the contrary, the conversation between Arroyo and Trillanes was cordial. The President’s parting shot was "Trillanes, you are a young, very bright and very idealistic officer. Huwag mong gayahin si Honasan at si Cardeño". The meeting lasted for about an hour.

In the evening of July 23, 2003, about 100 members of PMA '94 and '95 had dinner and a "photo opportunity" with President Arroyo in Malacañang Palace. A few days before the dinner, Chief of Staff, AFP (CSAFP) General Narciso Abaya held separate meetings with the officers of the two classes. He was informed of their sentiments, particularly that they were being unjustly dragged into the alleged plan for a rebellion. Through the efforts of their classmates in the PSG and Abaya, the dinner with Arroyo took place. Members of PMA ‘94 and ’95 were invited to the occasion for "pure socializing" through text messages that originated from Magdangal. The class officers, expecting to have a “dialogue” with Arroyo that night regarding the issues in the AFP that they would like to raise, got frustrated as all Air Force Capt. Segundino Orfiano was able to say after the dinner, when Arroyo briefly asked about the coup issue, was "…we are against corruption". Likewise, based on the remarks made on television immediately after the dinner, PMA ’94 class president Army Capt. Ma. Noel Tolentino said, "we assured her that we are still... we are loyal to her".

President Arroyo also attended on July 24 the turn-over of the command at the FSRR in Camp Tecson in San Miguel, Bulacan as part of the effort to neutralize the mutiny. Arroyo took this opportunity to visit with the members of the FSRR, which at that time was reported to have been significantly infiltrated by suspected rebels. She also visited on July 25 the Marine Training Camp in Ternate, Cavite, the PAF 15th Strike Wing, and the SWAG in Sangley Point, Cavite. Abaya made rounds of other units where restiveness had been reported.

In the early morning of July 26, the 10 suspected leaders declared unaccounted for by the AFP were identified as Trillanes, Layug, Gambala, Maestrecampo, and army officers Capt. Lawrence Louis Somera, Capt. Albert Baloloy, 1st Lt. Lawrence San Juan, 1st Lt. Florentino Somera, 1st Lt. Jose Enrico Demetrio Dingle, and 1st Lt. Waren Lee Dagupon. At 5:00 am, emergency meetings were held by Abaya, Golez, and Garcia with the general staff and senior officers to discuss the reports on the missing officers and the reported destabilization plot.

At around 10:00 am, Arroyo and Corpuz met with a group of NGOs at the EDSA Shrine. Corpuz announced that certain units from Tanay were missing.

At 2:00 pm, a meeting was held by the same group with House Speaker Jose de Venecia and the House Committee Chairman for Defense and Security, Prospero Pichay, to discuss the matter.

At 5:00 pm of July 26, 2003, Arroyo convened a full cabinet meeting where Cabuay presented a briefing on the looming coup plot. Thereafter, Arroyo publicly announced for the first time at 8:19 pm in the media that "a small band of rogue junior officers and soldiers had deserted their posts and illegally brought weapons with them". The security plan of action was immediately set in motion. Task Force Libra (TF Libra), the counter-coup composite unit of the AFP, was set in motion. The action forces were immediately dispatched in anticipation of the rumored coup.

A week earlier, a meeting of the leaders of "anti-President Gloria Macapagal Arroyo" (PGMA) groups allegedly to discuss pre-SONA activities at the Danarra Hotel in Quezon City was monitored by Government intelligence. On July 25, 2003, intelligence reports were received that some so-called "anti-PGMA" groups like the People's Movement Against Poverty (PMAP) and DEMOKRASYA had been instructed to assemble at the EDSA Shrine at 4:00 pm on July 27 and hold an overnight vigil there before proceeding to the Batasan area to hold anti-government rallies during the SONA. Invitations by the "anti-PGMA" group members to civilians to join the coup to be staged on July 27 were made through cellphone text messages. Among those who were recruited were past and present members of the DIABLO and Philippine Guardians Brotherhood, Inc. (PGBI). Police Chief Inspector Leborio Jangao, one of the founding members of PGBI, stated he received cellphone text messages on July 26 informing him that a coup d'état would be staged on July 27. At this time the crime disturbance personnel of the PNP had already been instructed to secure the EDSA Shrine, the Connecticut Street area, and the Ortigas Avenue Extension area from rallyists. There were reports the EDSA Shrine would be the target where another EDSA 2 or EDSA 3 would be staged.

Early on Friday night of July 25, the 80th Infantry Battalion based in Camp Capinpin was ordered to augment TF Libra. The mission of the TF Libra included the securing of vital communications installations such as radio and TV stations. It assisted the PNP in securing the EDSA Shrine and containing civilian groups in the area. The first elements of the joint TF Libra arrived in Camp Aguinaldo at about 11:00 pm.

For his part, Ebdane declared a full alert status nationwide, effective on 12:00 noon on July 26, as a contingency measure. All PNP field commanders were directed to secure vital installations and key establishments.

At around 2:00 pm of July 26, the Mandaluyong City police started the deployment of at least one hundred forty (140) personnel at the Poveda, Connecticut, and Ortigas areas. Later at 3:00 pm, intelligence reports indicated a change of instructions to the rallyists manning the EDSA Shrine. The anti-government groups were advised to assemble at the EDSA Shrine at 6:00 am on July 27 instead.

At about 7:00 pm of July 26, Maj. Gen. Efren L. Abu, Vice Commander PA and Commander of TF Libra, visited the 80th Infantry Battalion. By this time, TF Libra was already at its full strength. An hour later, Arroyo went on air and ordered the arrest of the junior officers who had deserted their posts. A conference presided over by Abaya was held at about 9:00 pm to assess the intelligence situation. Abu gave an update on the forces composition of TF Libra.

The PNP report on troop movement by Marines from Ternate, Cavite to the North or to Manila was confirmed by Cavite PNP Provincial Director Police Senior Superintendent Roberto L. Rosales and Marine Commandant, Maj. Gen. Emmanuel Teodosio. The advancing Marines were able to avoid checkpoints on their way to Makati by evasive movements. The PAF civil disturbance contingent earlier deployed at the Batasan area and the PN contingent at the VMMC, both in Quezon City, were then redeployed to the Makati area. An additional 100 Special Action Force (SAF) personnel of the PNP were then sent to secure the Batasan complex. In addition, one PA platoon and a PNP contingent reinforced the security forces of TV stations and telecommunications facilities.

Also on July 26, Naval Base personnel in Cavite received a report that three suspicious-looking vehicles were parked at the back of the Naval Sea Systems Command Armory in Fort San Felipe, Cavite City.

Following the order issued by Arroyo to the AFP and PNP for the arrest of the Magdalo officers at around 8:00 pm and the conference called by Abaya to assess the intelligence reports at 9:00 pm, operatives of the PNP’s Criminal Investigation and Detection Group (CIDG) were dispatched to Dasmariñas Village, Makati at around 10:00 pm that same night of July 26 to verify the presence of heavily armed men in military uniform reported by security guards of the Dasmariñas Village. National Bureau of Investigation (NBI) agents were also dispatched to monitor this development.

== The mutiny ==
Oakwood Premier (now Ascott Makati), Glorietta, in 2008, where the Oakwood mutiny occurred.

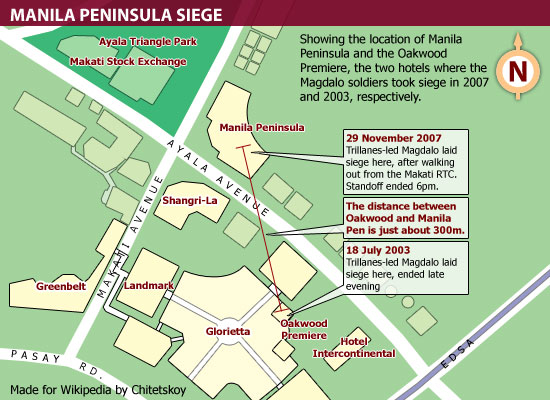
Location of Oakwood Premiere and the Manila Peninsula Hotel in Makati. These hotels had become the location of the Magdalo mutiny of 2003 and 2007, respectively.

The Oakwood siege had been facilitated by earlier activities as seen in the foregoing account. The antecedents show that the rebellion was not a spontaneous phenomenon as extensive preparations and mobilization activities were undertaken prior to the occupation and control of the Oakwood Apartments.

The rebels took over Oakwood at past 1:00 am of July 27. Over 300 soldiers quietly entered the premises of Ayala Center in several groups. The soldiers disarmed the security guards and took over Oakwood. They planted claymore mines around the building and in the vicinity. Snipers were posted at the Oakwood roof deck.

Two government command groups were immediately dispatched after reports of the occupation of Oakwood, and of movement of the Marine contingent from Ternate towards Camp Aguinaldo were confirmed. The Crisis Management Staff was formed at the Command Operation Center in Camp Crame, and the Advanced Command Post of the PNP was established behind the Intercontinental Hotel in Makati. Marines and Army officers later joined the PNP at the Makati post, and the Southern Police District Director, Police Chief Superintendent Jose Gutierrez, was designated as the ground commander. At around 2:00 am on July 27, Abu was informed by the Joint Operation Center in Camp Aguinaldo about the presence of troops moving towards Metro Manila. Most of these troops were coming from Ternate, Cavite. At this time, the Marines under Teodosio were already poised to stop the troops. They were pre-positioned around the car park behind Oakwood.

At about the same time, the security guards of Dasmariñas Village in Makati confirmed the presence of heavily armed men in full battle gear marching from Paraiso Street to the EDSA-Pasay Road gate of the village. The armed soldiers, wearing red armbands, forced the security guards to open the gate. They were seen crossing EDSA and going towards the direction of Ayala Center, Makati. The CIDG-NBI composite team confirmed that the rebel soldiers came from a house at 2177 Paraiso Street, Dasmariñas Village, owned by Ramon Cardenas who was residing at 1346 Palm Avenue in the same village. At 4:00 am TF Ayala of the Marine Corps had been activated and had occupied positions with infantry and armor, encircling the Ayala Center Complex.

Between 4:00 and 5:00 am, the rebel soldiers were able to make arrangements to go on air to issue a public statement. The ABS-CBN News (ANC) network showed a live TV coverage of the prepared statement read by Gambala. In the statement, the rebels declared their withdrawal of support from the chain of command and presented their grievances against the Arroyo government. They demanded the resignation of the Arroyo administration leaders and endorsed the NRP as the solution to the problems of the Philippines.

Also at dawn, Alex Benasin, a resident of the Baseco Compound in Port Area, Manila, was busy recruiting residents of the compound to go to Oakwood for a consideration of ₱300.00 (equivalent to ₱592.23 in 2021) each. Later, at about 8:30 am, members of the PGBI carrying banners of the NRP were seen in the Makati area but they were prevented by the PNP from reaching and camping in the vicinity of Oakwood. Pro-Estrada rallyists headed towards the People Power Monument on EDSA were also dispersed by police stationed in the area. It was reported that more pro-Estrada followers actively recruited people from various Metro Manila locations to regroup in the EDSA Shrine. Members of the PMAP marched in the direction of Makati from Greenhills.

After 9:00 am of July 27, Arroyo gave the rebel soldiers a 5:00 pm deadline to give up their positions peacefully and return to barracks. At around 1:00 pm, she declared the existence of a “State of Rebellion” and issued an order to use reasonable force, and pay due regard to constitutional rights, in putting down the rebellion. The rebel soldiers held another public airing of their grievances at around 4:20 pm. By that time, 25 rebel soldiers had surrendered to the TF Libra in two batches, as revealed by the Government command stationed outside of Oakwood. The announcement of the surrender was downplayed by the Magdalo group as part of a “psywar” operation on the part of the Government, during an ambush interview of Trillanes.

During the media briefing in the afternoon, other rebel officers besides the known leaders expressed their grievances against the Government while the press conference was going on. Trillanes, in a side interview by a news reporter, stated that they were willing to negotiate.

Teodosio arranged for the rebels’ close family members to go to Oakwood and help persuade members of the rebel group to give up their plans.

Shortly before the 5:00 pm deadline, Arroyo announced an extension of the deadline to 7:00 pm. It was during the two-hour reprieve that negotiations with various personalities and groups of negotiators prospered. As the deadline approached, negotiations between the rebel soldiers and the government team led by the government chief negotiator, Ambassador Roy Cimatu, effectively extended the deadline indefinitely. An agreement was forged between the two groups at 9:30 pm At 10:00 pm, Arroyo announced that the occupation of Oakwood was over. The rebels agreed to return to barracks and were out of the Oakwood premises by 11:00 pm.

== Grievances ==
Based on the press conference held by the rebels during their hold of the hotel, they justified their actions that they are merely taking this drastic actions to air their grievances which are to name a few:

- Alleged involvement of the Arroyo regime in staging "false flag" attacks regarding the Davao City airport bombing and the Sasa wharf bombing.
- Corruption in the AFP's Procurement System
- AFP Grievances Mechanism
- Sad and obsolete state of the AFP equipment
- State of the AFP Medical Services
- Benefits of soldiers killed in action
- State of the Philippine Air Force, and modernization
- Inadequate housing program for soldiers
- Overstaying retired officers in official housing for soldiers

== Outcome ==
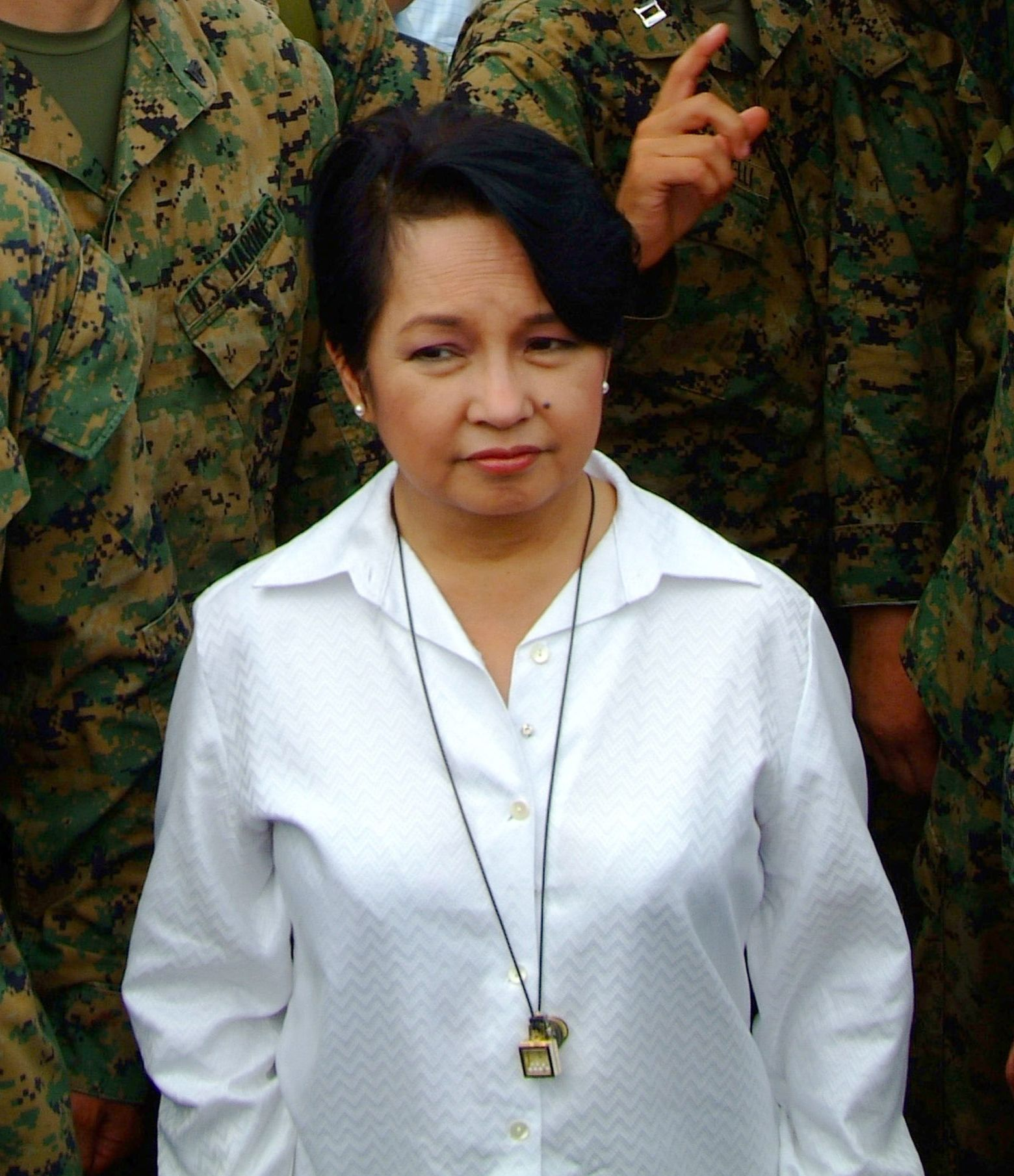
President Gloria Macapagal Arroyo

Flag of the rebel soldiers

The bloodless mutiny ended unsuccessfully within 18 hours when the soldiers failed to rally support from the public or the armed forces. All soldiers involved surrendered peacefully and were charged in a general court martial.

More than a year after the mutiny, its leaders apologized to President Arroyo for the failed military rebellion. Arroyo accepted the apology, but ruled out immediate pardon and said their trial would proceed. The officers faced sentences up to life in prison for the mutiny. Trillanes ran for a senatorial position during the 2007 Philippine Elections, using Magdalo paraphernalia. In November 2004, Arroyo ordered 133 of the 321 soldiers freed, saying they were deceived by their officers into joining the mutiny. However, insiders say that this was made possible through back-channel negotiations in the wake of the Magdalo leaders' apology.

== Escape ==
On December 14, 2005, Marine Capt. Nicanor Faeldon, one of the alleged leaders, escaped from custody and heavy guard after a hearing at the Regional Trial Court of Makati. He later issued a statement saying that after keeping his silence for over two years, he was leaving to "join the fight for a credible government." He stated that he knew that such actions would bear no benefit for himself, that he would never run for public office, while noting that the events since 2003 have proven him right. Shortly after his escape, four others of his co-accused, led by Army Lt. Lawrence San Juan also escaped from their detention in Fort Bonifacio, Makati.

While outside, Capt. Faeldon called for civil disobedience and set up an organization, Pilipino.org. His website received over a million visits in the days following his escape. He also had himself videotaped and photographed inside various military camps throughout the Philippines posting the videos and pictures on his website, saying that:

“Unless those corrupt generals man the gates themselves, no one can stop me from going in and out of these camps. The enlisted men and officers of the military and the police who remain loyal to the people will not turn me in.”

He was recaptured on January 27, 2006, in Mandaluyong by the AITF under the supervision of PCI Franz Georsua.

He was placed in solitary confinement in the detention center of the Intelligence Service Armed Forces of the Philippines, in Camp Aguinaldo. His salary was also suspended indefinitely. Thereafter, he was transferred to the Philippine Marine Brig in Fort Bonifacio where he was incarcerated until he disappeared during the Manila Peninsula mutiny.

== Guilty plea ==
On July 10, 2007, twelve junior officers, leaders of the Magdalo group – Magdalo is the name of the group of Officers involved in Oakwood Mutiny Incident, entered guilty pleas on charges of "conduct unbecoming an officer and a gentleman" – (Article 96, Articles of War) at a hearing at Camp Aguinaldo. They were Army Captains Gerardo Gambala, Milo Maestrocampo, Lawrence Luis San Juan, Albert Baloloy, John Andres, Florentino Somera and Alvin Ebreo, and First Lieutenants Cleao Donga-as, Audie Tocloy, Von Rio Tayab, Rex Bolo and Brian Yasay.

The verdict on the twelve officers, along with 17 others, will be released on the next scheduled hearing. The court will likely impose the penalty of “dishonorable discharge” on the junior officers. Five other junior officers, including former Lt/SG Grade Antonio Trillanes IV, who won a seat in the Senate in the 2007 Philippine mid-term elections, have not indicated any intention to enter into a plea bargaining agreement with the court. Trillanes, Gambala and Maestrecampo are members of the Philippine Military Academy Class of 1995.

On August 22, 2007, twelve of the accused were meted the sentence of dishonorable discharge by a military court under Brig. Gen. Nathaniel Legaspi. Sentenced were Army Captains Milo Maestrecampo, Gerardo Gambala, Albert Baloloy, Alvin Ebreo, Lawrence Somera, and John Andres; and First Lieutenants Rex Bolo, Von Rio Tayab, Audie Tocloy, Cleo Donga-as, Florentino Somera, and Brian Yasay. The sentence took effect once approved by President Gloria Macapagal Arroyo.

On December 20, 2007, fifty two officers led by Lt Jeveehboy Macarubbo of the Philippine Air Force was released upon the order of the Military Court. These officers were sentenced to be separated from the service. The mass release came after they were granted executive clemency that shortened the jail term handed down by a military tribunal.

On April 29, 2008, the military tribunal, presided by Brig. Gen. Nathaniel Legaspi, sentenced 5 Magdalo soldiers to be discharged from service for pleading guilty for violation of Articles of War 96 (conduct unbecoming an officer and gentleman) for their participation in the July 27, 2003, Oakwood mutiny. Army 1st Lieutenants Lawrence San Juan, Sonny Bumidang, and Nathaniel Rabonza were discharged from the military service. Also sentenced were 1Lt. Jason Panaligan and 2Lt. Christopher Orogan, to 7 years and 6 months imprisonment for violating AW 97 (conduct prejudicial to good order and military discipline). The court's decision was still subject to the approval of President Arroyo.

Eleven junior officers, led by Navy Lt. Senior Grade James Layug and Marine Capt. Gary Alejano, on June 10, 2008, altered their pleas to guilty to a general court martial for violations of the Articles of War concerning the Oakwood (now Ascott hotel) mutiny. Accordingly, just 6 officers remain charged before the court martial, including Sen. Antonio Trillanes IV, and fugitive Marine Capt. Nicanor Faeldon.

=== Appointment, presidential pardon and release from detention ===
Seventeen former members of the Magdalo group were each given a Philippine Drug Enforcement Agent (PDEA) badge and were appointed PDEA agents on May 6, 2008. They were part of the 53 junior officers who were honorably discharged after a plea bargain agreement after four years of detention. Arroyo on May 12, 2008, approved the conditional pardon for 9 convicted Magdalo soldiers. Captains Milo Maestrecampo and Gerardo Gambala, Albert Baloloy, John Andres, Alvin Ebreo, Laurence Luis Somera, First Lieutenants Florentino Somera and Cleo Donga-as and Second Lieutenant Bryan Yasay, were all released from detention in Fort Bonifacio on May 16, 2008, by newly installed Army commander Lt. Gen. Victor Ibrado per Court release order, and after their signing of the joint sworn acceptance of conditional pardon. On April 8, after plea of guilt, the Makati Regional Trial Court sentenced Gambala and Milo Maestrecampo to reclusion perpetua, while Army Captains Alvin Ebreo, Laurence Louis Somera, Albert Baloloy and John Andres, 1Lt. Florentino Somera, 2Lt. Kristoffer Bryan Yasay and 1Lt. Cleo Dongga were sentenced to prison mayor. On April 11, Army Captain Gerardo Gambala spoke for the 9 Magdalo officers, appealing for presidential pardon. The 9th division of the Court of Appeals acquitted the coup d'état charges of Army 1Lt. Lawrence San Juan and 1Lt. Rex Bolo filed by the Department of Justice on April 5, 2015.

== Refusal to plea bargain ==
Marine Capt. Nicanor Faeldon, one of the accused officers, refused to enter a guilty plea and issued a statement on July 27, 2007, the fourth anniversary of the incident, explaining his decision.

== See also ==
- Hello Garci scandal
- Manila Peninsula siege
