= State of rebellion =

Government declaration that suspends a number of civil rights in the Philippines

In the Philippines, a state of rebellion is a government declaration that suspends a number of civil rights for a short period of time. It is a form of martial law that allows a government to suppress protest, detain and arrest people, search private property, read private mail, and listen to phone conversations using wiretaps - all without legal warrants. It is mainly used to stop an attempted coup. It differs from martial law, in that the military does not take over functions the government, although the military is often called to protect the government from rebels.

President Gloria Macapagal Arroyo of the Philippines declared a state of rebellion in the country for two times: first on May 1, 2001 throughout Metro Manila by virtue of Proclamation No. 38 because of EDSA III (or the May 1 riots), a protests by supporters of former president Joseph Estrada and the Iglesia ni Cristo (INC) after the arrest of Estrada and second, covering the entire country on July 27, 2003 by virtue of Proclamation No. 427 after the mutiny at the Oakwood Premier Ayala Center apartment tower by the Magdalo Group in Makati.

The term "state of rebellion" is a euphemism favored by those in power in the Philippines because former president Ferdinand Marcos ruled under martial law for nine years.

== See also ==
- 2006 state of emergency in the Philippines
- Martial law in the Philippines
- State of calamity (Philippines)
- State of emergency
