= Port of Davao =

Port of Davao Pantalan sa Dabaw Daungan ng Dabaw
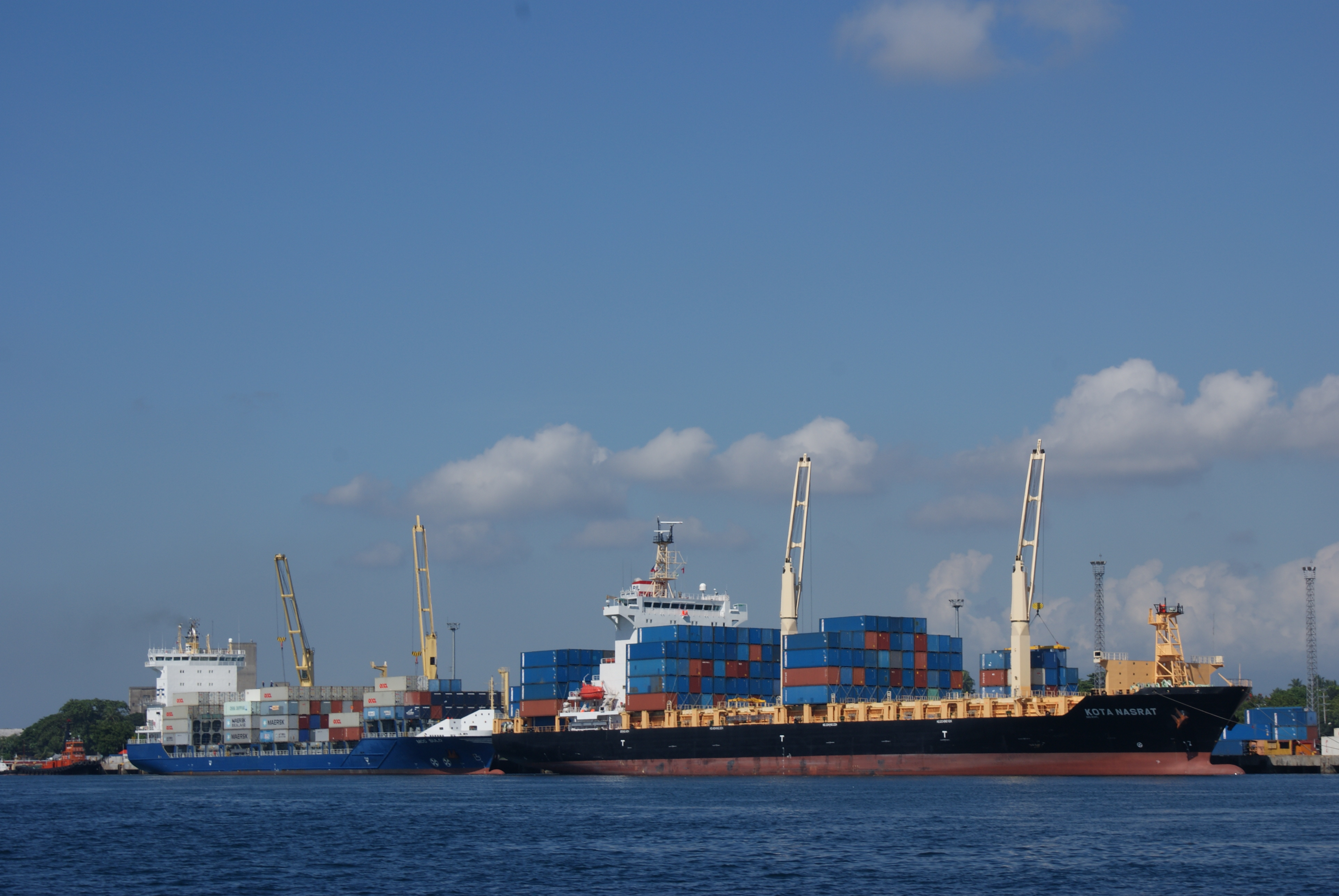
- Sasa International Seaport, Davao City
- Interactive map of Port of Davao; Pantalan sa Dabaw; Daungan ng Dabaw

Location
- Country: Philippines
- Location: Sasa, Buhangin, Davao City, Philippines
- Coordinates: 7.128234°N 125.663705°E
- UN/LOCODE: PHDVO

Details
- Opened: 20th Century
- Operated by: Philippine Ports Authority/Davao Port Management Office
- Owned by: City Government of Davao
- Type of Harbor: Natural/Artificial
- No. of wharfs: 2
- No. of piers: 9

Statistics
- Vessel arrivals: 25,337^{(2013)}
- Annual cargo tonnage: 9,877,615^{(2013)}
- Annual container volume: 544,642 TEU^{(2013)}
- Passenger traffic: 1,634,277^{(2013)}
- Website http://www.ppa.com.ph/

The Port of Davao, or Davao Port (Cebuano: Pantalan sa Dabaw, Filipino: Daungan ng Dabaw), is a seaport located in Davao, Philippines. The Port of Davao consists of a number of ports, all within Davao Gulf which is part of the Celebes Sea, but its main office and seaport is located at Brgy. Sasa, Davao City. The Port of Davao is largely dominated by container cargo, raw materials exportation, bulk cargo, general cargo, and passenger traffic facilities.

== About ==
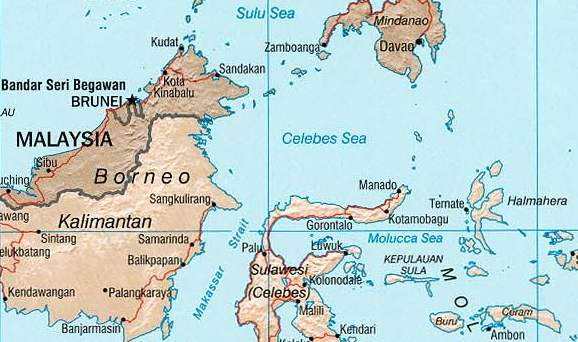
Celebes Sea

Davao Port, or the Port of Davao, is one of the Philippines major seaports alongside Manila, Subic, Cebu, Zamboanga, and others. The Port of Davao, often called Port District of Davao, includes Davao City and the five provinces. Davao port services inter-island and international shipments. The city is situated 974 kilometers south of Manila, on the shore of Davao Gulf. "Davao" also refers to five provinces: Davao de Oro, Davao del Norte, Davao del Sur, Davao Occidental, and Davao Oriental. Davao City is located in Davao del Sur but is politically and administratively independent of the province. The access to the port of entry in Davao City is through Davao Gulf, which has two approaches. One is at Pakiputan Strait between Davao and the water west of Samal Island. The other approach is at the east side of Samal Island mainly used as an exit channel of vessels departing from points north of Davao Gulf. Access to the subport of entry in Mati, Davao Oriental is through Pujada Bay. Davao Gulf is situated on the south coast of Mindanao, the second largest island in the Philippines.

The port itself is the most important in Mindanao and also has the busiest international container port in both Visayas and Mindanao. The port serves as the gateway to the southern Philippines and is considered as the best-performing port in Mindanao. A number of passenger ship-lines operate to Davao, including 2GO Travel.

== History ==
The Port of Davao, which replaced the nearby Bankerohan harbor, was opened on July 1, 1908. The construction of the Santa Ana pier amounted to ₱29,940.42 and used timber contributed by local merchants and planters. A typhoon in 1910 destroyed the wharf and caused Davao to close its port of entry on October 31, 1910, and move its foreign trade to Zamboanga. The repair for the Santa Ana port was completed in 1921, but its design was insufficient to handle trade for large vessels. Ships that could not dock in Davao had to ship its crops to Zamboanga or Cebu.

The Davao port was opened to international trade in 1926, and underwent gradual improvements, such as pier widening from 9 meters (30 ft) to 15 meters (49 ft) in 1936 and land reclamation. After several testimonies from ship captains, the Commonwealth government approved the deepwater port of Catitipan, used by the Asiatic Petroleum Company in the mid-1930s, as a secondary port of entry.

Due to the ever-expanding economy of the city, it later became one of the busiest seaports in the country.

In World War II, the port became a landing and anchor zone for American naval forces participating in the Battle of Davao.

== Facilities ==
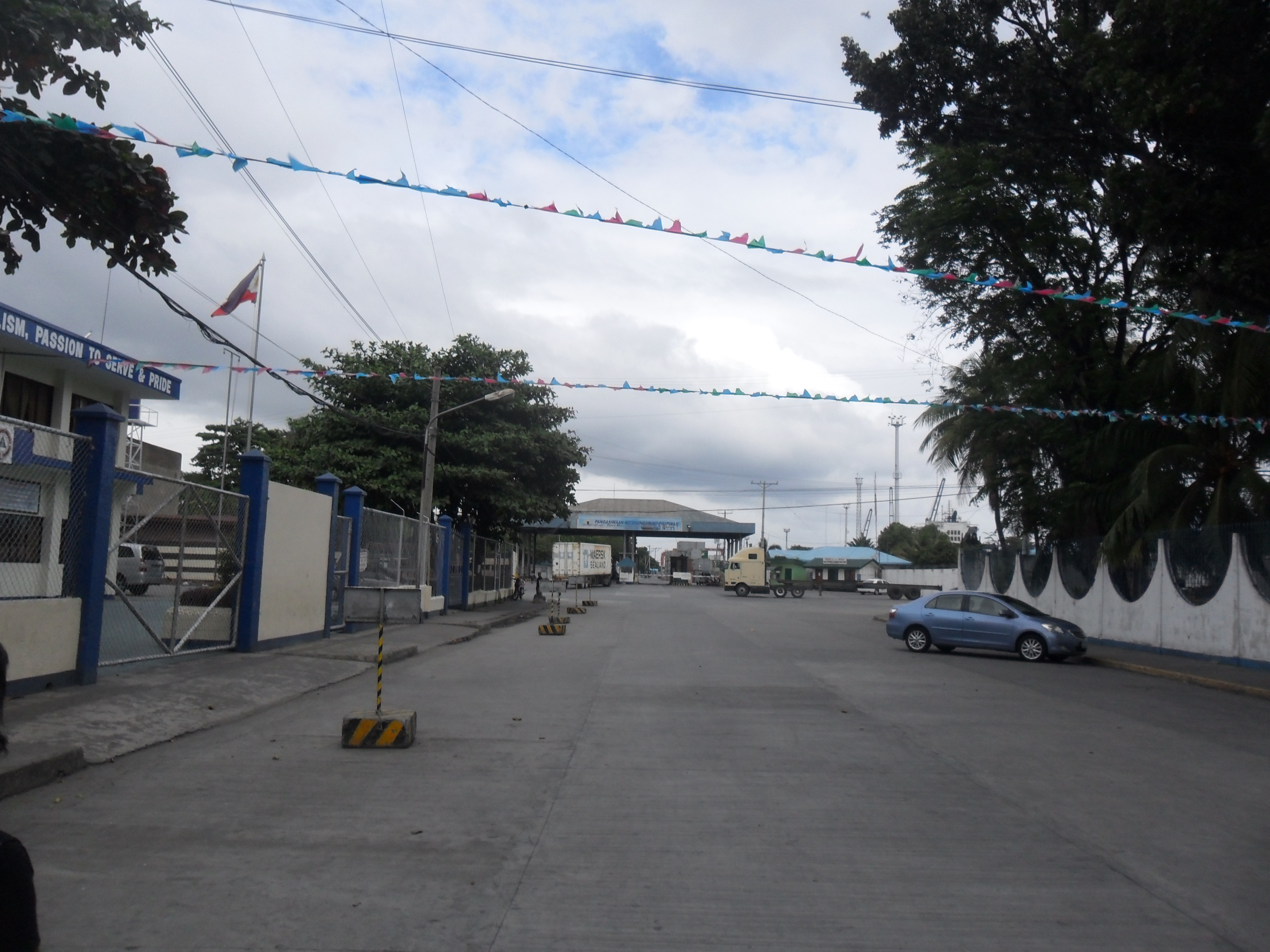
Vicinity of Port of Davao

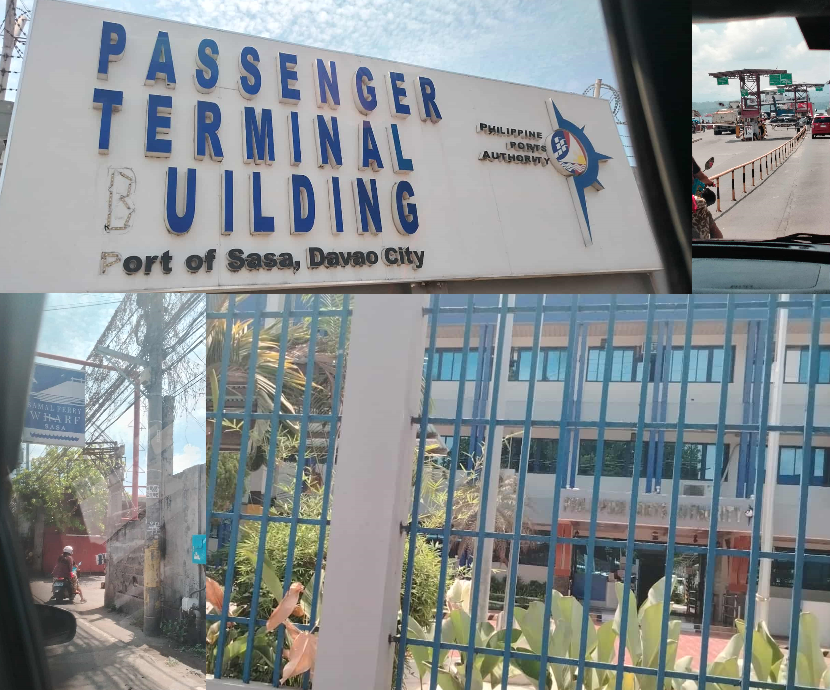
Montage of Port of Davao

Apart from the government pier and private pier, a number of piers and wharves exist in the Davao Port region specifically for commercial use. Vessels awaiting berth availability anchor about 400 meters (1,300 ft) off Sta. Ana pier in 21.9 meters (72 ft) mud. The anchorage is well protected except during strong southwest monsoon. Pilotage is compulsory for foreign-going vessels with 100 GT and over; and for domestic vessels with 75 GT and over. Request for pilot should be made 48 hours in advance, and contact made on VHF 2 hours before arrival.

Davao City and the Port of Davao has 2 government international seaports, that of the Sasa International Port and the Sta. Ana Wharf, and 9 privately owned ports. The city government is currently in the process of taking over the management of the seaports to modernize facilities, such as 3 big modern quayside cranes and to expand capacity. In addition, the Toril international Fish Port Complex accommodates small and large-scale fishing activities as well as provides among others cold-storage facilities.

Below is a list of major piers and wharves within Davao Port.

=== Sasa International Seaport ===
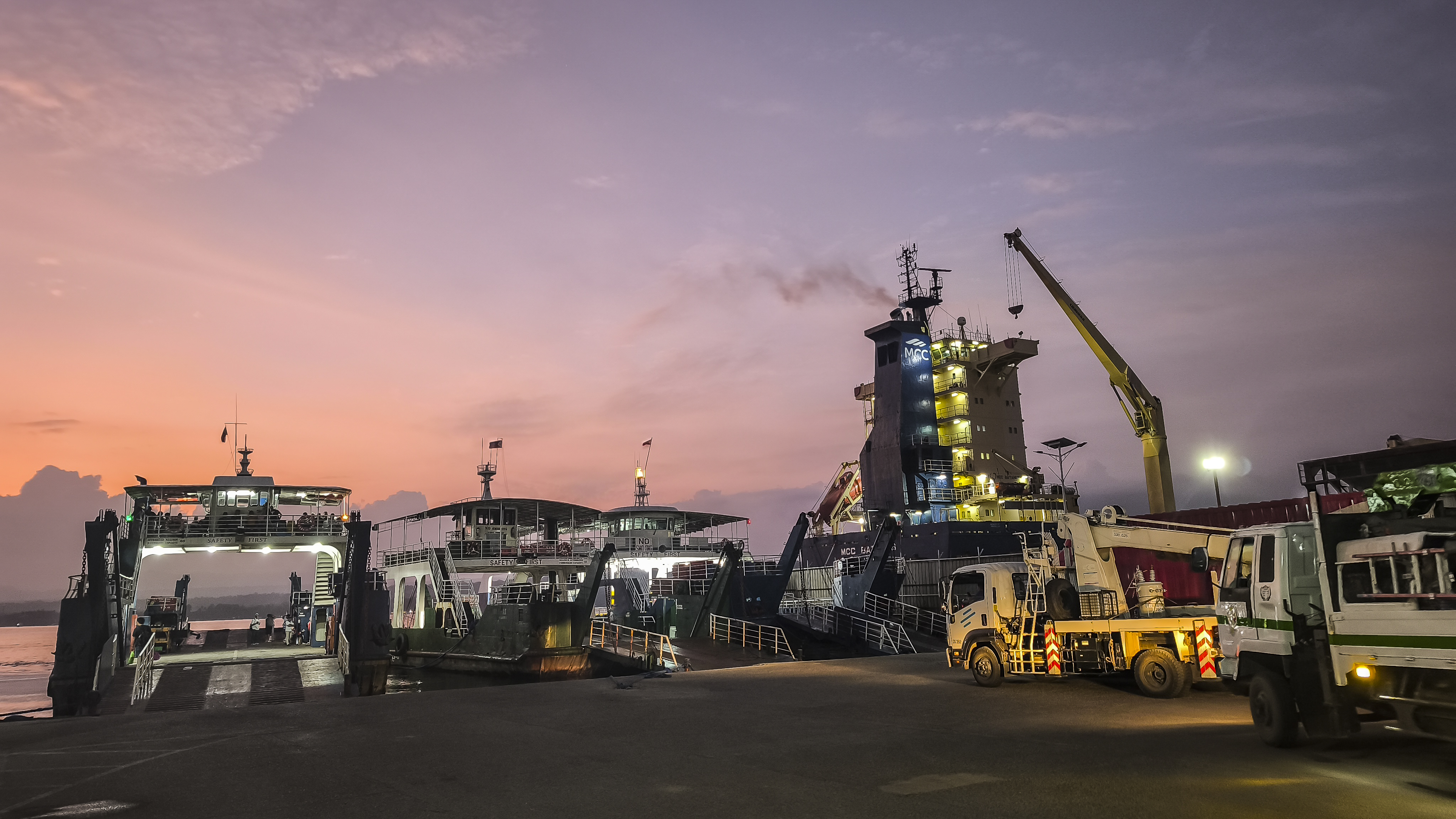
Sasa International Seaport, Davao City

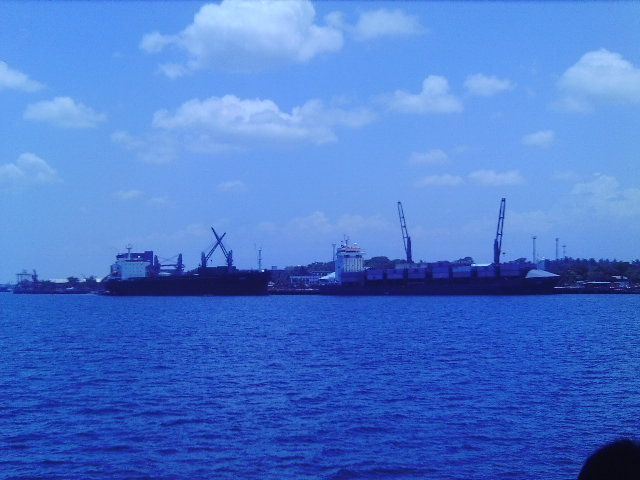
Sasa International Seaport, Davao City

Located in Brgy. Sasa, Davao City, Sasa International Seaport is the main seaport serving the Davao Gulf area as the main base of the port. It is generally used for container and international shipping and operated by the International Container Terminal Services inc., which also operates at the Port of Manila and Port of Subic. It is one of the largest piers in the Port area and also the busiest.

=== Samal Ferry Wharf ===
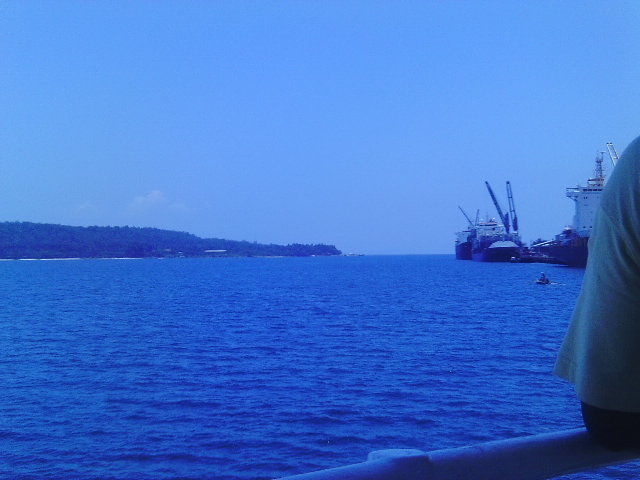
Sasa International Seaport, with Samal Island in the distance

Located just north of the International Seaport at Km11, Sasa, Davao City. Home to the roll on / roll off vehicle and passenger ferry from Davao City to Samal Island. In December 2021, the Mae Wess Company (who operate the ferry service) announced they would begin running the service 24 hours a day.

=== Sta. Ana Pier ===
Located in Davao Chinatown, Magsaysay St., Davao City, Sta. Ana Pier handles mainly domestic and passenger vessels.

=== Mati Wharf, Mati City, Davao Oriental ===
Used primarily for corn, copra, logs, and general cargo.

=== Pacific International Terminal Pier ===
Non-commercial port that handles exportation of bananas and other fruit products.

=== Legaspi Oil Company Pier ===
Non-commercial port that handles exportation of coconut products such as copra, coco oil & copra pellets.

=== Universal Robina Pier ===
Handles importation of flour grains and similar types.

=== Davao Union Cement Pier ===
Handles exportation of cement to coal and other ore products.

=== Piso Point Port ===
Located at Piso Point, Banaybanay town, Davao Oriental province, this port is primarily used for mineral stockpiling and exportation.

=== Tefasco pier ===
Handles asphalt and similar products.

=== Stevedorage Services Corporation pier ===
The Stevedorage Services Corporation pier handles general cargo, bulk cargo, vehicles and lumber. It is one of the busiest piers in the port.

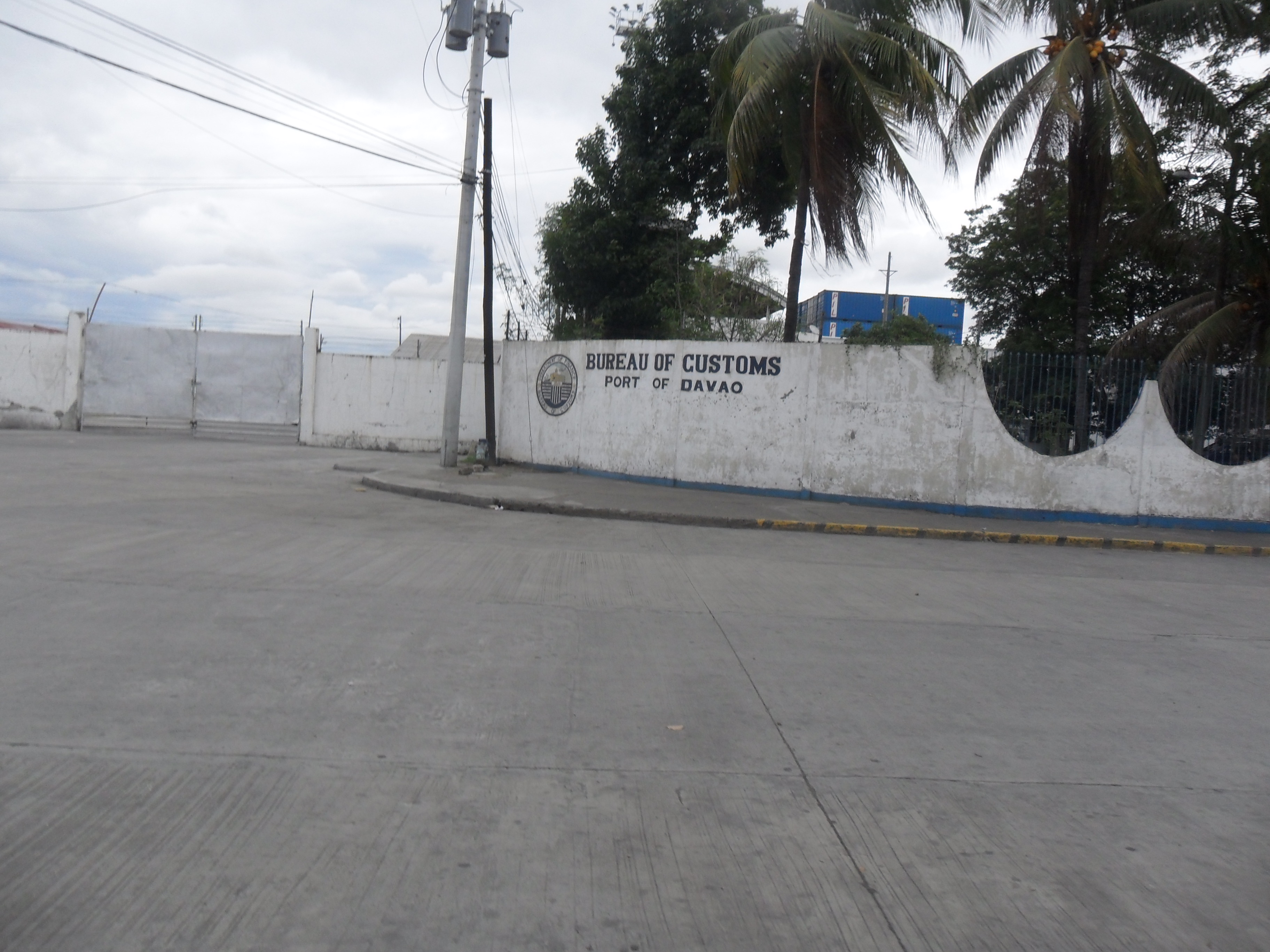
Bureau of Customs Davao City Office

== Data ==
Facility Data for The Port of Davao
Type	m^{2}
Transit Shed	
Passenger Terminals + Parking	
Container Yard	
Storage Areas	
Warehouse	

== See also ==
- List of East Asian ports
- Port of Manila
- Port of Zamboanga
- Davao City
- Metro Davao
- Davao Gulf
