= Battle of the Buliok Complex =

- Part of the Moro conflict
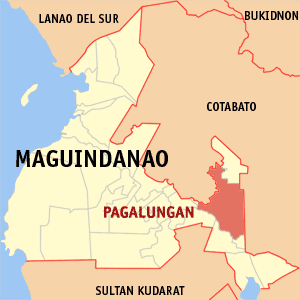
- Barangay Buliok is located in Pagalungan, Maguindanao del Sur
Date	1st phase: February 11 – February 16 2003; 2nd phase: March 10–13, 2003
Location	Pagalungan, Maguindanao del Sur, Philippines 6.9693°N 124.7520°E
Result	Philippine government victory

Belligerents
Philippines: Armed Forces of the Philippines	Moro Islamic Liberation Front

Commanders and leaders
Gloria Macapagal Arroyo; Narciso Abaya	Salamat Hashim; Murad Ebrahim; Abu Nidal †

Strength
	2nd phase: 1,000

Casualties and losses
First Phase: 8 killed (Philippine Government claim); 118 killed (MILF source); 86 wounded (MILF source) Second Phase: Unknown	First Phase: 161 killed (Philippine government source; denied by the MILF); 40 killed (MILF source) Second Phase: 200 killed (Philippine government source)
- 7 civilians killed 41,000 residents displaced 3 – 100 evacuees died

The Battle of the Buliok Complex took place on 11 February 2003 in an area within the present provinces of Maguindanao del Sur and Cotabato in Mindanao, Philippines. The 60-hectare complex, which stretches from Pikit to Pagalungan, was a stronghold of the Muslim separatist Moro Islamic Liberation Front (MILF). Accused by the Philippine government of harboring members of Pentagon, a notorious kidnap-for-ransom gang operating in Mindanao, the MILF was attacked in the Buliok complex by the Armed Forces of the Philippines under orders from then-President Gloria Macapagal Arroyo.

== Background ==
After losing their camps, foremost of which was Camp Abubakar, due to the "all-out-war" policy of then-President Joseph Estrada in 2000, the MILF withdrew into the areas around the Liguasan Marsh. The Buliok Complex (called the Buliok Islamic Center or the Buliok Mosque by the MILF) encompasses areas where the boundaries of Maguindanao (before the province was divided), Cotabato and Sultan Kudarat meet. It was within this complex that the MILF re-established their presence.

== The battle ==
The Philippine government commenced military operations against the MILF on the day Eid al-Adha was being celebrated, tactically reasoning that the MILF forces would be vulnerable to attack. The government at first would not state the reason for the attack on the complex; later it would admit that the main objective was the MILF itself, in order for the government to maintain the dominant position in the conflict. Jesus Dureza, chairman of the government panel during peace talks with the MILF during this time, is on record stating that the attack on the Buliok complex came after the government failed to forge a ceasefire agreement with the MILF.

A thousand MILF rebels also tried to recapture the complex on March 10 however were repulsed

From March 10 to 13, 200 MILF fighters were killed in attempts to retake the complex according to the Philippine Government

== Aftermath ==
The Buliok complex was captured by government forces on 13 February 2003. A month after, the MILF attempted to retake their lost stronghold in an offensive that resulted in the deaths of 68 of their members. During this period, the Armed Forces of the Philippines and the MILF exchanged widely-conflicting casualty reports. Government military officials commented on how "youthful-looking" the slain MILF fighters were; Mohagher Iqbal, then-spokesman of the MILF central committee, admitted that some of their fighters were "able-bodied teenagers" who voluntarily joined the MILF.

Salamat Hashim, the founder of the Moro Islamic Liberation Front, died by year's end.

== See also ==
- 2000 Philippine campaign against the Moro Islamic Liberation Front
- Bangsamoro peace process

LLambayong–Tinumiguis Operation (2003)

The Lambayong–Tinumiguis operation was a Philippine Army military operation conducted on 13 February 2003 in Sitio Taga, Barangay Tinumiguis, Lambayong, Sultan Kudarat, Philippines, during the broader conflict between the Philippine government and the Moro Islamic Liberation Front (MILF).

The operation involved personnel of the 24th Light Armor (LIONHEART) Company, Task Force “Bigkis Lahi,” under the Light Armor Battalion, Philippine Army. The unit conducted an offensive operation following an attack and harassment of the area by an estimated 200 MILF fighters reportedly led by a commander identified as “Guevarra.”

During the engagement, a platoon led by 2LT Sylvia Lina Varona deployed several armored vehicles, including V-150 Commando and Simba Fighting Vehicles, to support ground operations. The vehicles were deployed in formation and employed their onboard weapon systems against identified enemy positions.

The armored crews maneuvered under small-arms and heavier weapons fire, including rocket-propelled grenades (RPGs) and crew-served weapons. According to the unit's account, the armored vehicles' suppressive fire disrupted the attacking force and contributed to the rescue of civilians reportedly held hostage during the encounter.

The engagement demonstrated the use of Philippine Army light armored vehicles in support of ground forces during counterinsurgency operations in Central Mindanao in the early 2000s.
