= Terrorism in the Philippines =

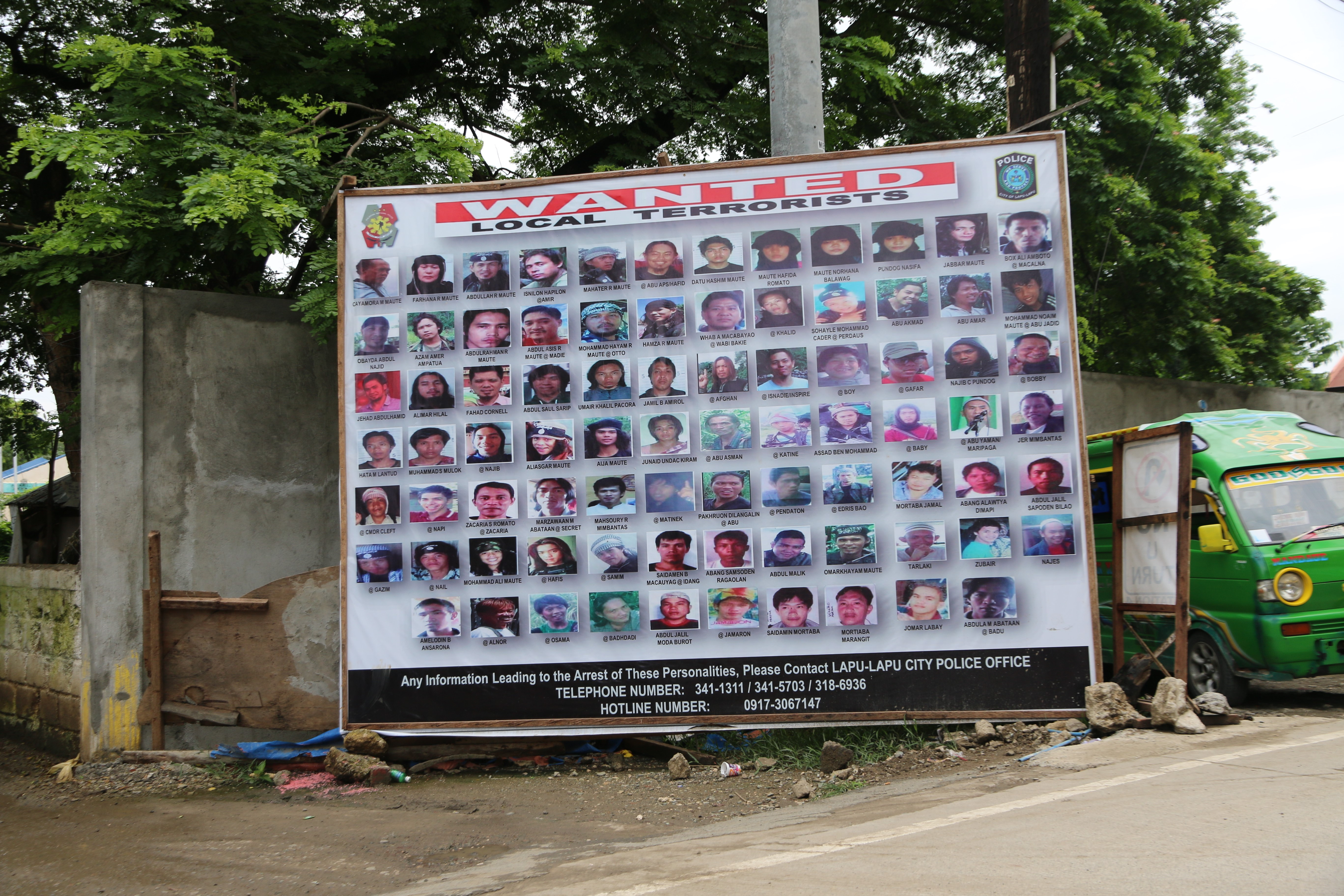
Wanted poster in Lapu-Lapu City displaying the photos and names of local terrorist suspects.

Terrorism is a major social issue in the Philippines linked to the Moro conflict and the communist rebellion. The country ranks in 23rd place on the Global Terrorism Index's 2026 list of countries most affected by terrorism.

== Overview ==
Since the late 1960s, terrorism has become a major problem in the Philippines. These terrorist attacks are often carried out by several Jihadist and militants groups with different ideologies and motives. Such acts of terrorism include bombings, domestic terrorism, kidnapping, drug trafficking, extortion, mass murder, assassination and other types of attack. Terrorist groups like Abu Sayyaf, the Bangsamoro Islamic Freedom Fighters and Jemaah Islamiyah mostly operate in the Southern Philippines. The New People's Army maintains a wider range of operations across the country and launches attacks albeit on a lesser intensity than other rebel movements.

Following the September 11 attacks, the Philippines became a new front on the American-led war on terror During George W. Bush’s presidency, the U.S sent foreign aid and American troops in Mindanao to assist in counterinsurgency operations as part of Operation Enduring Freedom in the Philippines. The Siege of Marawi ended in the deaths of several terrorist leaders and reduction of Islamic State presence in the Philippines.

Terrorist incidents in the Philippines
Year	Number of incidents	Deaths	Injuries
2019	348	284	393
2018	424	297	343
2017	692	218	+1,400
2016	633	411	720
2015	717	444	752
2014	597	472	723
2013	651	432	666
2012	247	210	440
2011	149	127	224
2010	205	155	231
2009	230	152	354
2008	275	220	388
2007	65	115	404
2006	58	60	163
2005	25	49	149
2004	32	206	160
2003	107	288	531
2002	48	125	342
2001	50	154	274
2000	132	190	643
1999	31	45	190
1998	18	6	85
1997	57	98	273
1996	61	95	143
1995	63	201	102
1994	72	126	198
1993	8	56	216
1992	162	395	465
1991	162	432	247
1990	320	457	340
1989	156	393	323
1988	210	550	256
1987	160	404	485
1986	80	322	355
1985	124	452	377
1984	43	262	108
1983	16	101	30
1982	38	139	250
1981	31	176	362
1980	60	163	540
1979	50	107	76
1978	36	128	193
1977	2	0	0
1976	10	47	73
1975	4	1	45
1974	1	3	0
1973	0	0	0
1972	7	2	1
1971	4	0	0
1970	10	41	13

== Legal aspects ==
According to Philippine laws, terrorism is a crime under the Human Security Act of 2007 which describes such acts as causing "widespread and extraordinary fear and panic among the populace". The first group to be officially listed as a terrorist organization under the law was the Abu Sayyaf on September 10, 2015, by the Basilan provincial court. The law's weaknesses was cited by Senator Panfilo Lacson, who called the law a "dead letter law" for being "severely underutilized".

On 3 July 2020, President Rodrigo Duterte signed into law Republic Act 11479, better known as the Anti-Terrorism Act of 2020. This replaced the Human Security Act and revised and expanded the definition of terror offenses. Rights groups criticized the law, calling it "draconian", and filed a case on its constitutionality to the Supreme Court; the Court upheld the law on 26 April 2022 but struck down provisions allowing the anti-terror council (ATC) to designate a person or a group as terrorists based on a request by another country and a vague definition of terrorist acts that was deemed too "overbroad and violative of freedom of expression."

Through the ATC, the Philippine government has designated individuals and organizations linked to the group as "terrorists". On 21 September 2022, a petition filed by the Philippine government in 2018 to declare the Communist Party of the Philippines (CPP) and its armed wing, the New People's Army (NPA) as terrorist organizations citing the Human Security Act was denied by the Manila Regional Trial Court, which ruled that the groups were not organized for terrorism and their resort to armed guerrilla warfare was only a means to achieve their purpose. It also cited the absence of a law that banned membership in communist groups.

=== Challenges to allegations of violating the anti-terror law ===
In 2021, the Olongapo Regional Trial Court acquitted Japer Gurung and Junior Ramos, Indigenous Aeta residents of Zamboanga, in the first known anti-terror law case, ruling that the accusations were the result of mistaken identities.

In November 2023, the prosecutor's office in Santa Rosa City in Laguna rejected a complaint against human rights worker Hailey Pecayo and other activists over the alleged violation of the anti-terror law. In the same month, a prosecutor in Antipolo, Rizal, dismissed anti-terror law charges against human rights activists Kenneth Rementilla and Jasmine Rubia.

In November 2023, Windel Bolinget and three other Indigenous rights workers of the Cordillera People's Alliance filed a case before the Baguio Regional Trial Court challenging their designation as terrorists by the Anti-Terrorism Council.

== Recent trends ==
Since January 2000 radical Islamist groups and Islamist separatist forces have carried out over 40 major bombings against civilian targets, mostly in the southern regions of the country around Mindanao and the Sulu archipelago. Numerous bombings have also been carried out in and around Metro Manila, several hundred kilometres from the conflict in the southern regions, due to its political importance. From 2000 to 2007 attacks killed nearly 400 civilians and injured well over 1500 more, more casualties than caused by bombings and other attacks in Indonesia, Morocco, Spain, Turkey, or Britain during the same period.

Public transport and other gathering places, such as street markets, have been targets, however large-scale abductions and shootings have also been carried out by these groups, predominantly by the Abu Sayyaf and the Rajah Solaiman Movement.

Under the Bongbong Marcos administration in June 2023, the Anti-Terrorism Council (ATC) designated four leaders of the Cordillera Peoples Alliance (CPA) as terrorists; Windel Bolinget, Jennifer Awingan, Sarah Abellon-Alikes, and Steve Tauli were accused of being members of the CPP-NPA Ilocos Cordillera Regional White Area Committee. A month later, the ATC suspended Congressman for the 3rd district of Negros Occidental, Arnolfo Teves Jr.; his brother, Pryde Henry Teves; and eleven other associates as terrorists acting under what it called the "Teves Terrorist Group", in connection with the assassination of Negros Oriental Governor Roel Degamo in March. This was the first time the council designated an elected official as a terrorist.

== See also ==
- List of terrorist incidents in the Philippines
- Terrorism in Davao City
- Insurgency in the Philippines
- Moro conflict
- War on terror
- Philippines–United States relations
