= Talomo =

District in Davao City, Philippines

Coordinates: 7°04′30″N 125°32′50″E

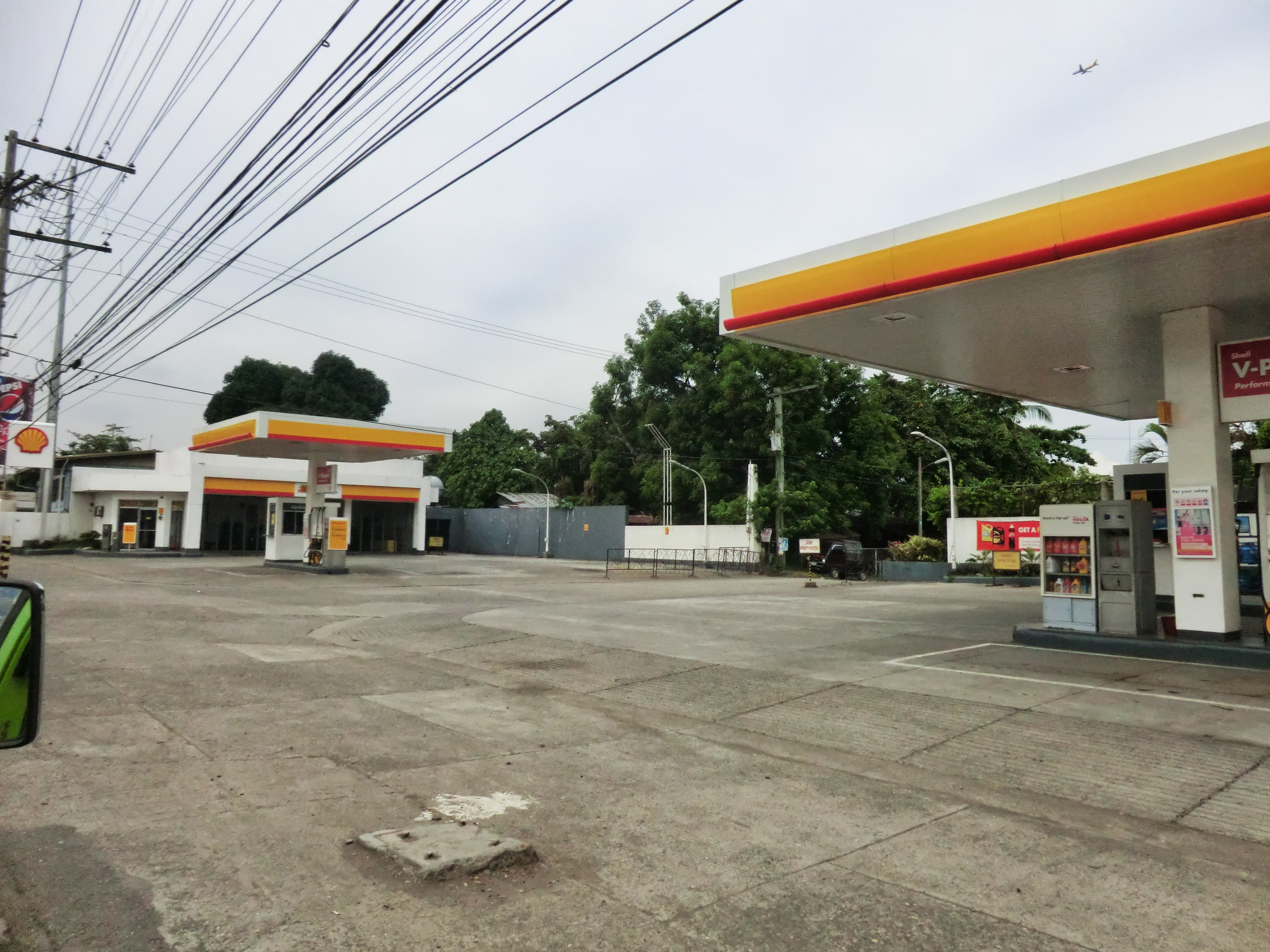
- A Shell station in Talomo Proper

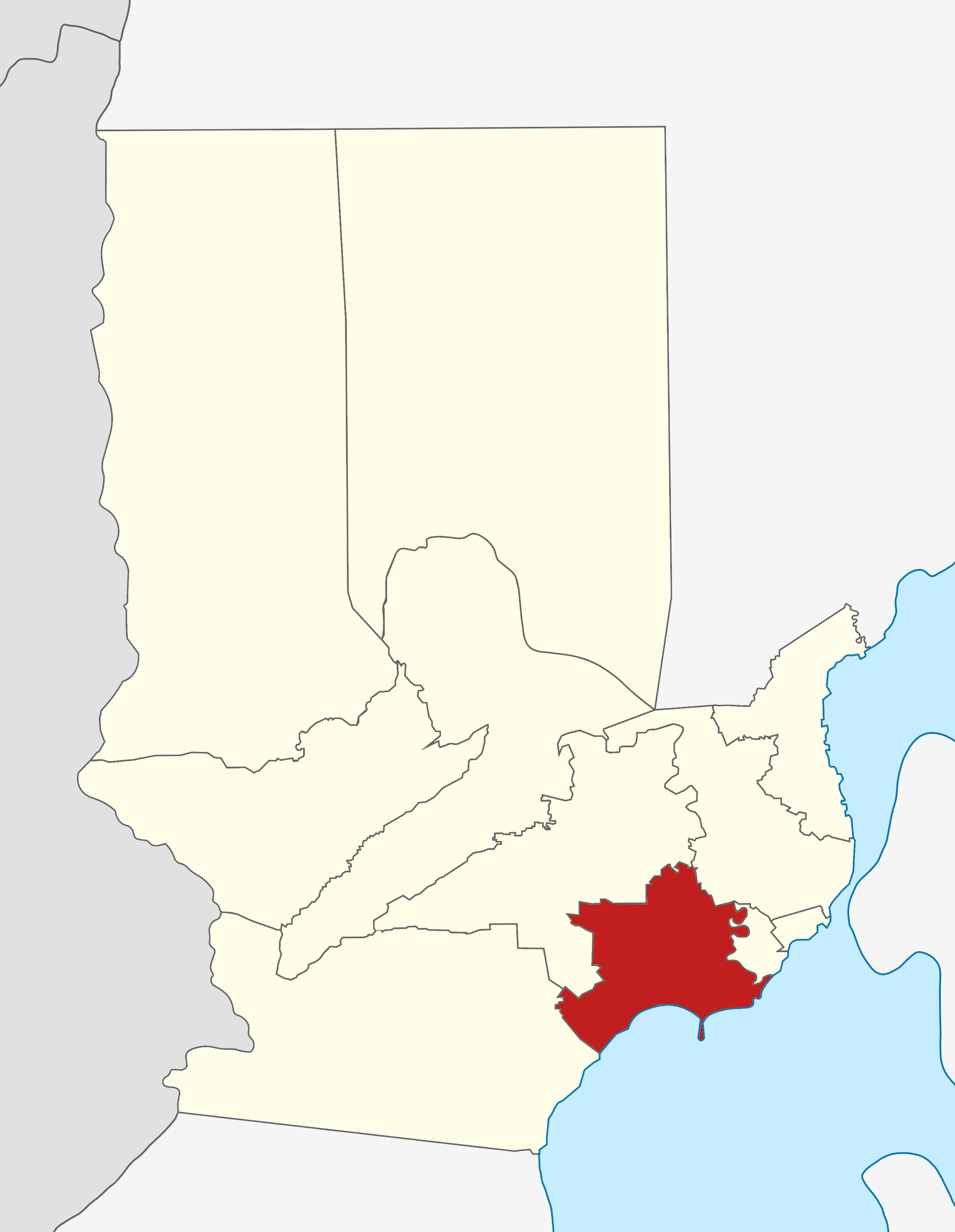
- Location of Talomo District in Davao City.
- Country: Philippines
- Region: Region XI
- Province: Davao del Sur (geographically only)
- City: Davao City

Population (2020 census)
  - Total: 444,833
- Time zone: UTC+08:00 (Philippine Standard Time)

Talomo is an administrative district of Davao City in the Philippines. In 2020, Talomo had a population of 444,835, and is the most populated district in Davao City. It is situated in the 1st congressional district of Davao City.

== Geography ==
Talomo is a district in Davao City that borders the districts of Toril, Buhangin, Tugbok, and Poblacion.

== Barangays ==
Talomo is politically subdivided into 14 barangays. Each barangay consists of puroks and some have sitios.

- Bago Aplaya
- Bago Gallera
- Baliok
- Bucana
- Catalunan Grande
- Catalunan Pequeño
- Dumoy
- Langub
- Ma-a
- Magtuod
- Matina Aplaya
- Matina Crossing
- Matina Pangi
- Talomo Proper
