= 2005 Valentine's Day bombings =

Building bombing in the Philippines

The Valentine's Day bombings happened on 14 February 2005 in different cities in the Philippines. Three bombs exploded on that day killing at least nine people and injuring more than a hundred. Abu Sayyaf claimed responsibility and three members of the group were convicted of murder in one bombing.

== Bombings ==
On 14 February 2005, bombs exploded almost simultaneously at a bus terminal in Davao and outside the Gaisano Mall in General Santos. Half an hour later, at about 7:30 p.m., a third bomb exploded on a bus in Makati, under the Ayala station of the elevated Manila Metro Rail Transit System and near Glorietta and the InterContinental Hotel, where President Arroyo and her family were to have been dining to celebrate Valentine's Day. At least nine people were killed and more than 100 injured (some sources say 11 deaths and at least 85 injuries, or twelve deaths and at least 144 injuries). Abu Sayyaf claimed responsibility, as it had for bombings the previous year including the SuperFerry 14 bombing in February 2004; a spokesman called the three explosions a "Valentine's Day gift to Mrs. Arroyo".

== Investigation and trials ==
The following month, seven men were charged in the bombings, including the head of Abu Sayyaf, Khadaffy Janjalani, charged with others in absentia. Gappal Bannah y Asali, known as "Maidan" or "Boy Negro", became a witness for the prosecution after surrendering to the police on 3 March. On his testimony, three Abu Sayyaf members, Gamal Baharan ("Tapay"), Angelo Trinidad ("Abu Khalil"), and Rohmat Abdurrohim ("Abu Jackie" or "Abu Zaky") were convicted by the Makati Regional Trial Court of responsibility for planting the Manila bomb and sentenced to death. Baharan and Trinidad had confessed to planting the bomb on the bus. In 2008 the Court of Appeals affirmed the verdict but commuted the sentences to life imprisonment without parole. In 2011 the Supreme Court of the Philippines confirmed their convictions.

The Valentine's Day bombings are considered part of a campaign of terrorist attacks carried out by Abu Sayyaf with the assistance of Jemaah Islamiyah to disrupt government negotiations with the Moro Islamic Liberation Front; a third such major attack was the bombing of the ferry Doña Ramoña on 28 August 2005.
