= Philippines–United States relations =

- Philippines: United States

Diplomatic mission
- Philippine Embassy, Washington, D.C.: United States Embassy, Manila

Envoy
- Ambassador Jose Manuel Romualdez: Ambassador Lee Lipton

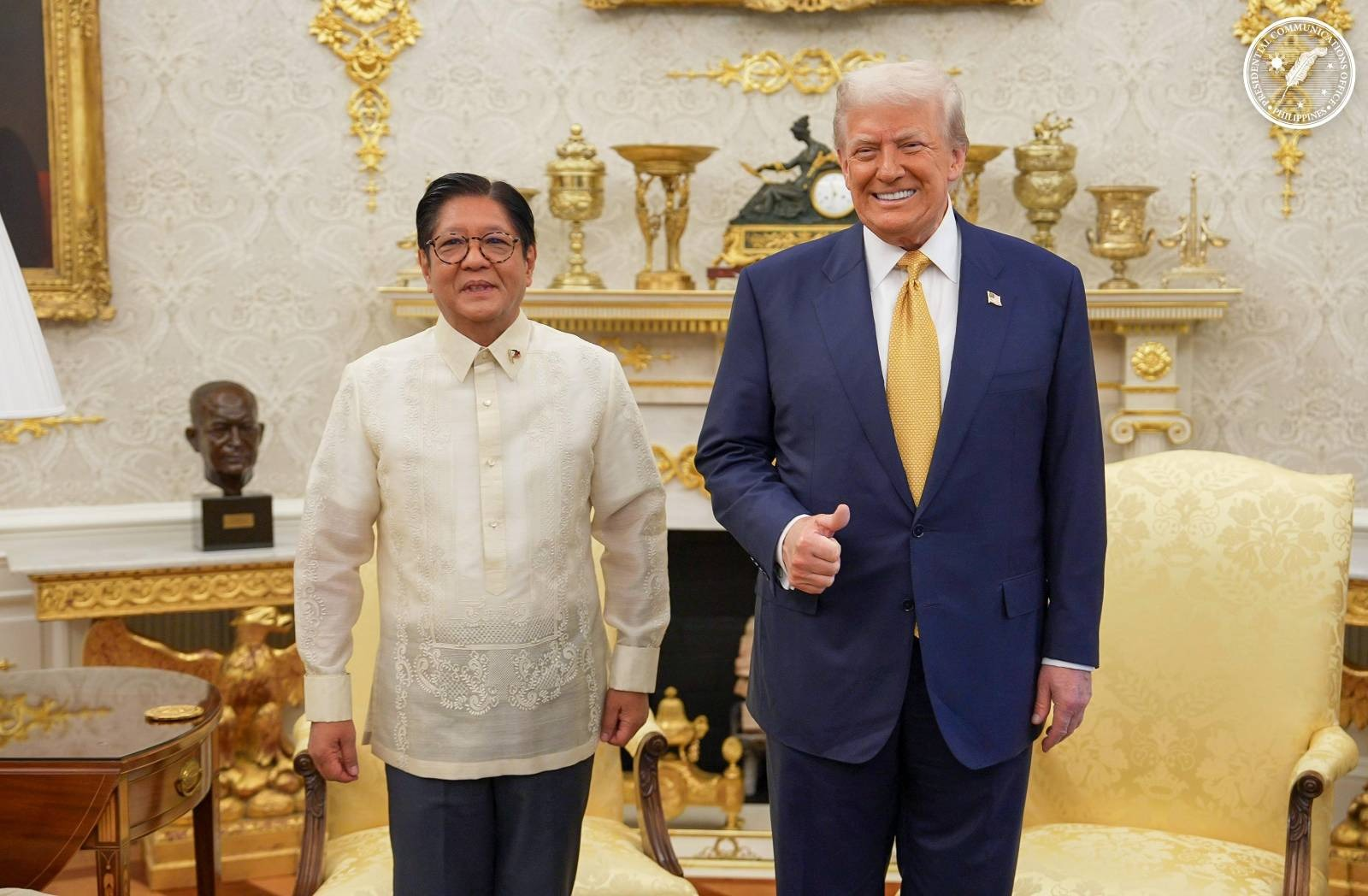
Philippine President Bongbong Marcos meeting with U.S. President Donald Trump in Washington, D.C., July 22, 2025

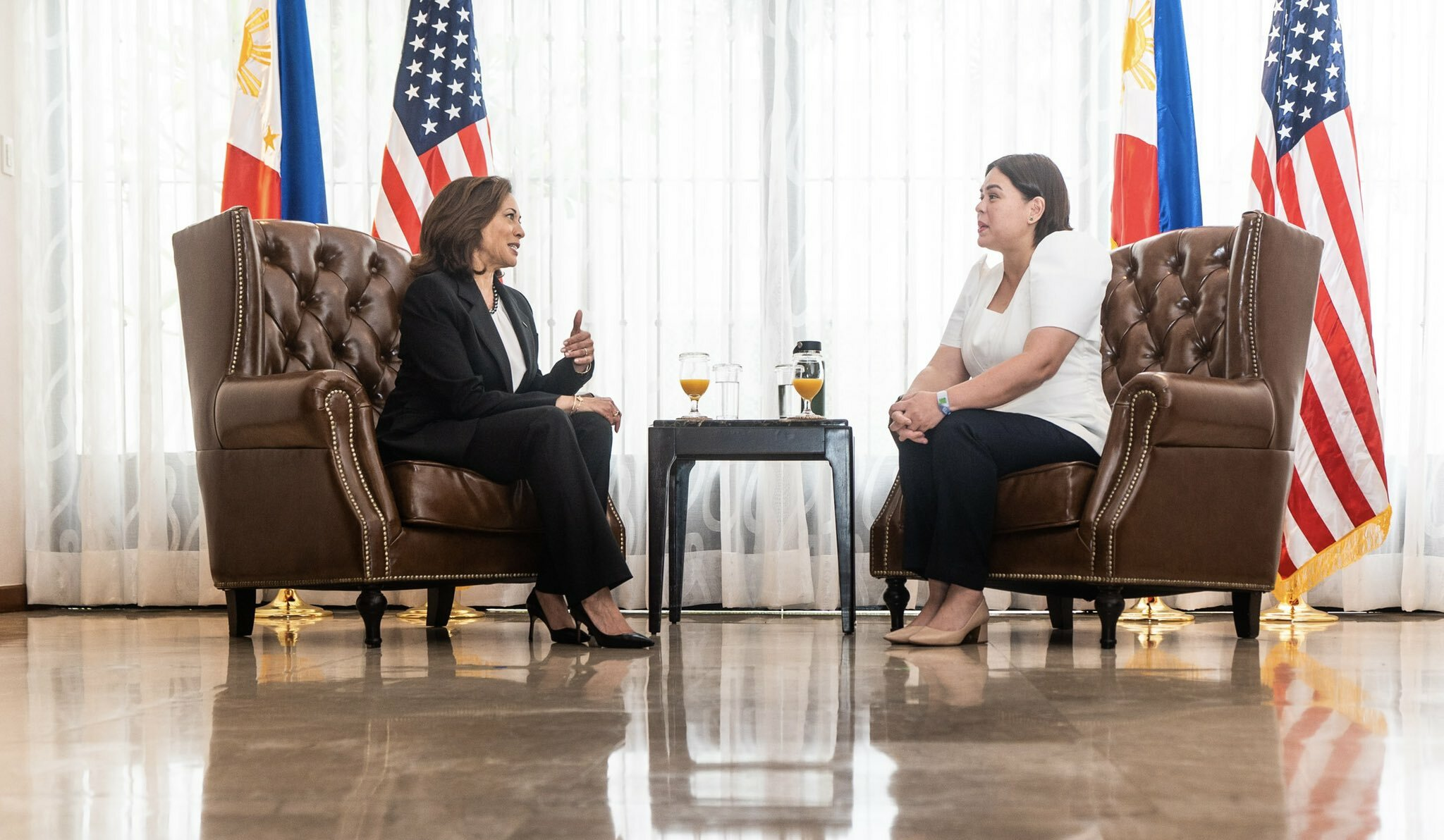
Then-U.S. Vice President Kamala Harris meeting with Philippine Vice President Sara Duterte in Manila, November 21, 2022

Philippines–United States relations (Filipino: Ugnayang Pilipinas at Estados Unidos) are the bilateral and diplomatic relations of the Republic of the Philippines and the United States of America.

The relationship has been historically strong, described by some as a "special relationship" as a consequence of the Philippines' American colonial period between 1898 and 1946. The Philippines is one of the United States' oldest Asian partners and a strategically major non-NATO ally. Since 1951, the countries have been formally bound in a mutual defense treaty. An outlier was the early presidency of Rodrigo Duterte, who sought closer relations with China and Russia.

The economic dimensions of the relationship have been shaped by U.S. advocacy for neoliberal reforms under the Washington Consensus framework, implemented through IMF and World Bank structural adjustment programs since the 1980s.

This article covers Philippine–American relations after Philippine independence from the United States in 1946, while the article History of the Philippines (1898–1946) describes the history of the Philippines during American colonial rule.

== History ==
The Republic of the Philippines and the United States of America have a long and storied history with each other. Firstly, Filipinos are the oldest Asian ethnic group in the Americas. Filipino sailors were the first Asians in North America. The first documented presence of Filipinos in what is now the United States dates back to October 1587 around Morro Bay, California. The first permanent settlement of Filipinos was in Louisiana in 1763; the settlers there were called "Manilamen", and they served in the Battle of New Orleans during the closing stages of the War of 1812, supporting the Americans against the British Empire. The American state of Texas, due to it being a former Spanish territory, was even once called "New Philippines", so named since the Spanish wanted to replicate the prosperity they achieved in the Philippines in that territory in the Americas. The 1898 Philippine Revolution against Spain was inspired by the French and American revolutions. The United States eventually purchased the Philippines from Spain in the Treaty of Paris, and afterwards the Americans invaded and destroyed the First Philippine Republic in the Philippine–American War.

The United States federal government nearly considered selling Mindanao to the German Empire in 1910.

Except for the brief interruption of the Japanese occupation between 1942 and 1945, the United States ruled the Philippines from 1898 to 1946, after which, the Philippines was granted independence after being devastated by the Second World War.

Despite the essential role Filipino soldiers played in the United States victory in the Pacific during World War II, their contributions in defending democracy and liberty were totally ignored. Instead, the U.S. government denied them one important right given to everyone else who has served in the United States Military: the right to veterans’ benefits. Of the 66 allied nations who fought with the U.S. in World War II, only the Philippines was singled out by the Rescission Acts of 1946.

In the Second World War, the Filipinos formed a close alliance with the United States to resist Japanese occupation—they became independent on July 4, 1946.

During the Cold War between the capitalist United States and communist Soviet Union, the Philippines received negligible financial assistance from the United States despite being devastated by World War 2, having defended US interests, and being a former colony. It received only US$5 billion of aid in totality since independence compared to the larger amounts of free development aid given to other Asian allies like: Israel (US$317.9 billion in free aid), South Korea (US$119.9 billion in free aid) South Vietnam (US$104 billion), Taiwan, (US$41.81015 billion by year 1975, equivalent to US$242 billion in 2024) and Japan. The United States considered the economic development of their other allies more important than that of the Philippines because they had hostile pro-Soviet Union neighbours which the United States were opposed to. Furthermore, America applied a deindustrialization policy and supported free market reforms in the Philippines, assigning it a role of only "supplying raw materials" while being open to foreign imports, because Japan was designated to be the main industrial export power in Asia, thus retarding industrialization efforts in the Philippines while the other nations that were protectionist and had industrial policy surged ahead in development.

According to the Book: "The Anti-Development State: The Political Economy of Permanent Crisis in the Philippines - by Economists; Walden Bello, with Herbert Docena, Marissa de Guzman and Marylou Malig", according to them, the "unfair" treatment of the United States; by actively investing in its own former enemies: Japan, and its colonies; Taiwan and South Korea, since they were threatened by Communist Russia and China, and the United States wanted them as rich "Showcase Countries" to be a good examples against Communism, and also allowing: Japan, South Korea, and Taiwan, to have an Activist State-Led Capitalism which was also protectionist, made them grow rich. Whereas the United States "hypocritically" applied the reverse policy in the Philippines its own former colony and steadfast friend, since the American led World Trade Organization forced the reverse of the policies it did for East Asia, in supporting the privatization of National Companies in the Philippines and mass adoption of unrestricted open-trade killing local companies and industries, and adopt the reverse of protectionism, which was trade-liberalization, as well as imposing the Bell Trade Act giving Americans equal rights to Filipino citizens to exploiting local resources in exchange for World War 2 repair money, allowing for massive capital flight away from the Philippines to the United States, which they didn't even apply to American occupied Japan.

The US supported the dictatorship of Ferdinand Marcos.

=== Pivot to China during the Duterte administration ===
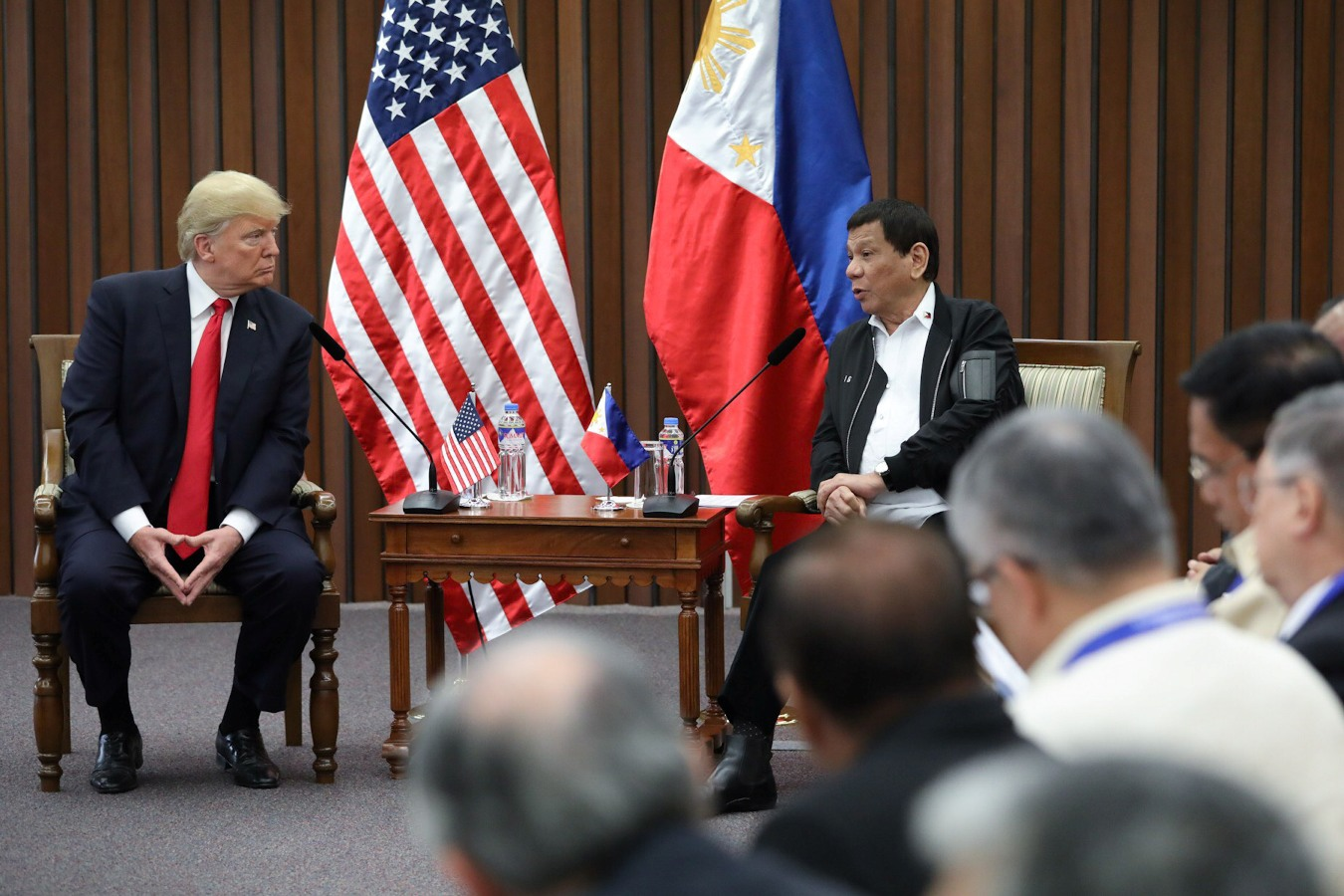
U.S. President Donald Trump meeting with Philippine President Rodrigo Duterte in Manila, November 13, 2017

After President Rodrigo Duterte formally assumed the office on June 30, 2016, US–Philippine relations began to sour. A rift between Duterte and then-US President Barack Obama began when Obama expressed his concern over human rights issues on Duterte's "War on Criminality and Drugs". According to a statement issued by the White House, Obama commended the country for its "vibrant democracy", but also highlighted "enduring values" that underpinned their "longstanding ties", including "shared commitments to democracy, human rights and rule of law". This intervention and Duterte's choice of words while speaking about Obama during a press conference, where he called him "a son of a whore" resulted in a canceled meeting between the two leaders during the 2016 ASEAN summit held in Laos.

A few weeks later, Duterte suggested American special forces cease their operations in Mindanao and leave. He cited the killings of Muslim Filipinos during a U.S. pacification campaign in the early 1900s, which he said were at the root of the long restiveness by minority Muslims in the largely Catholic nation's south. During an official visit to Vietnam on September 28, 2016, he explicitly expressed his desire to end the Philippines' joint military exercises with the United States. Duterte announced the upcoming scheduled war games would be the last under his term, while adding that he would continue to uphold the Philippines' treaties with the U.S.

As of October 2016, despite Duterte's shift of foreign policy towards China and away from the U.S., Filipinos still held low approval and trust in China relative to the U.S. On former president Fidel Ramos' resignation as special envoy to China, he stated that he didn't like Duterte's treatment of Obama.

Duterte later said following the 2016 U.S. presidential election that he would stop quarrels with the U.S. following President Donald Trump's victory. Trump had planned to continue to aid the country during his presidency.

According to a report by Reuters, the United States ran the #ChinaAngVirus disinformation campaign to discredit the Sinovac Chinese COVID-19 vaccine, including using fake social media accounts to spread the disinformation that it contained pork-derived ingredients and was therefore haram under Islamic law. The campaign primarily targeted people in the Philippines and used a social media hashtag for "China is the virus" in Tagalog. The campaign ran from 2020 to mid-2021. The primary contractor for the U.S. military on the project was General Dynamics IT, which received $493 million for its role.

=== Relations during the Marcos Jr. administration ===
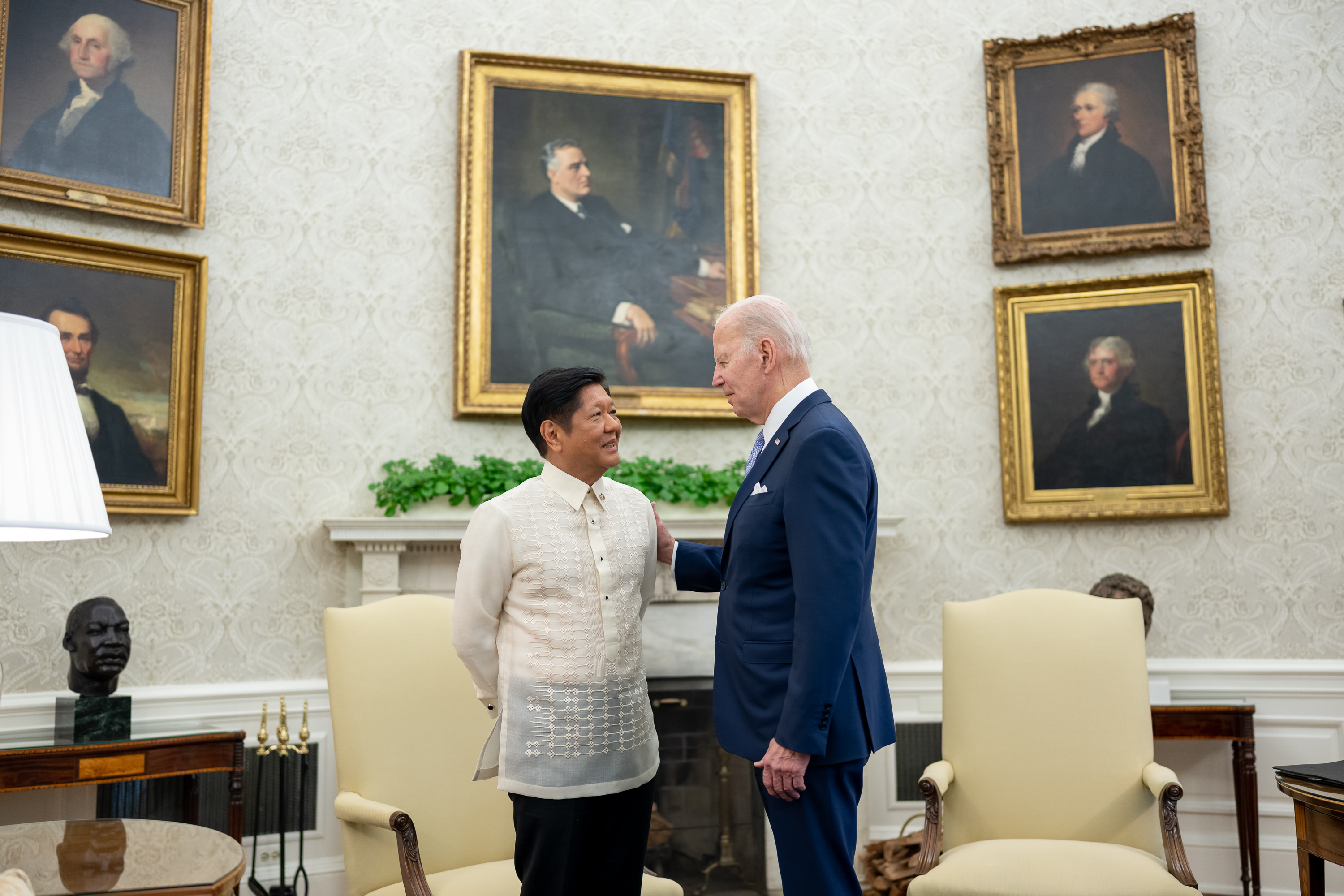
Philippine President Marcos meeting with then-U.S. President Joe Biden in Washington, D.C., May 1, 2023

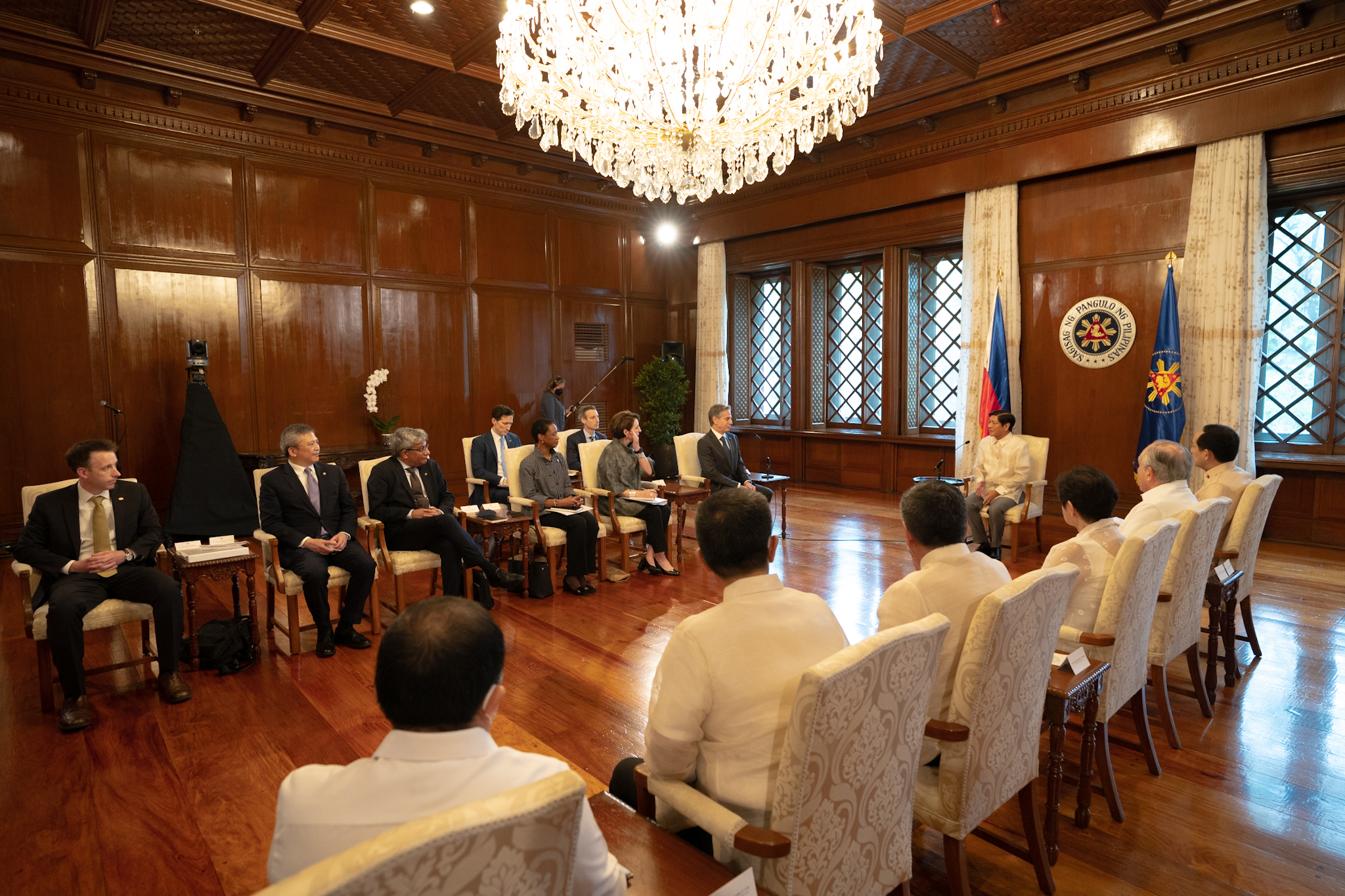
American diplomats, led by then-U.S. Secretary of State Antony Blinken, meet with Philippine officials, led by President Marcos, at Malacañang Palace in 2022

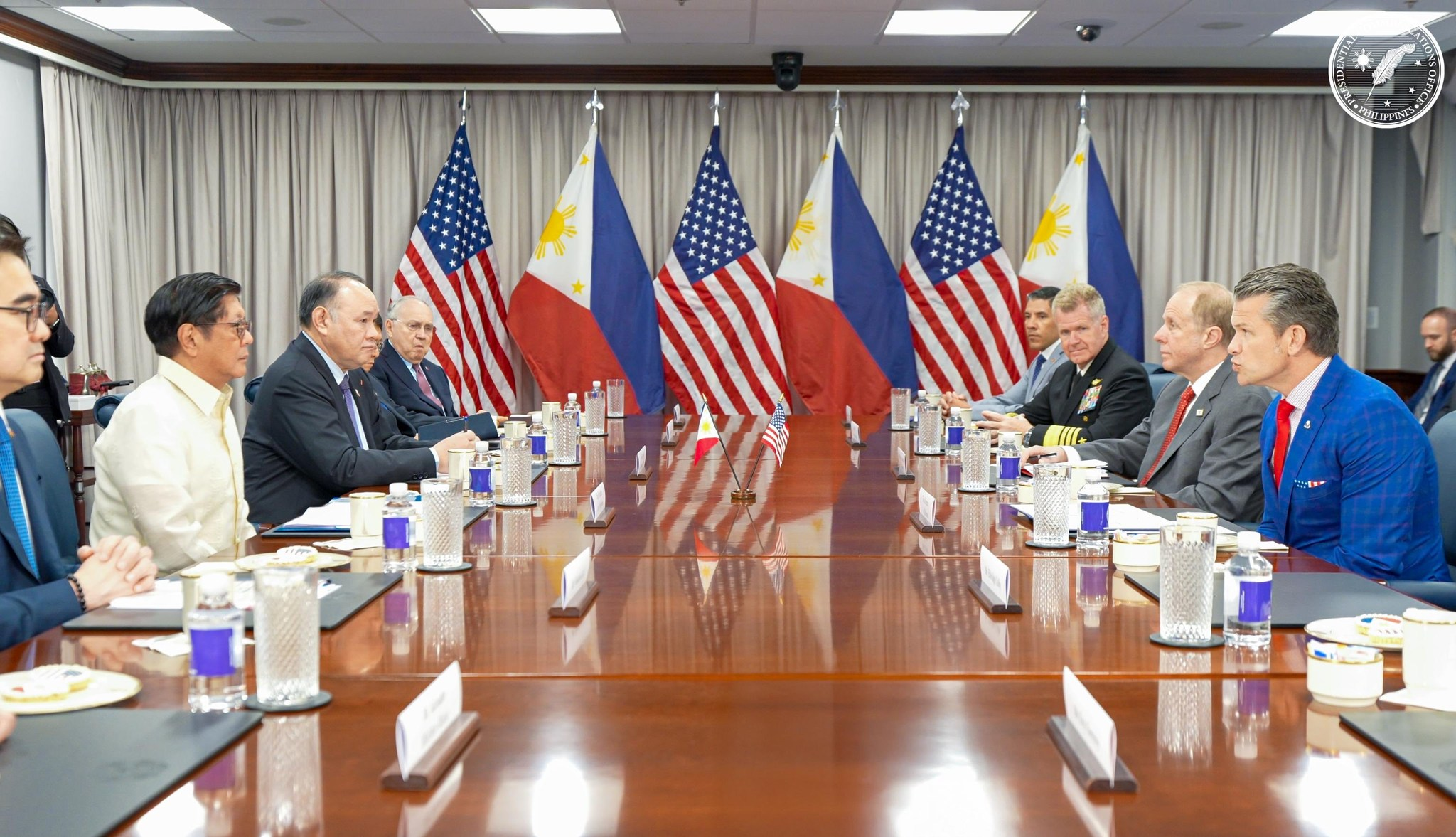
Philippine officials, led by President Marcos, meet with U.S. defense officials, led by Secretary Pete Hegseth, at the Pentagon in 2025

Ferdinand "Bongbong" Marcos Jr., the Philippine president since June 2022, appears to be attempting to normalize relations with the United States in part due to China's geostrategic rise and the need to cooperate on the economy. However, the Biden administration has said human rights will come first in America's dealings with the Philippines, responding to concerns with Marcos' and Duterte's human rights records.

In August 2022, Marcos met with U.S. Secretary of State Antony Blinken. He met with U.S. Vice President Kamala Harris and Second Gentleman Doug Emhoff in November.

Marcos and U.S. President Joe Biden met face-to-face on the sidelines of the 2022 United Nations General Assembly on September 23. During Marcos's working visit to the United States on September 18–24, top financial officials secured investment pledges of $4 billion and 100,000 jobs for the Philippines. Biden pledged to help the Philippines with energy and food security, reiterating that message during the 40th and 41st ASEAN Summits in Cambodia during the week of November 9–13, 2022.

In February 2023, Marcos briefly met with Biden's Defense Secretary Lloyd Austin to finalize an agreement to add U.S.-accessible Philippine military bases to the Enhanced Defense Cooperation Agreement.

On April 11, 2024, Marcos, along with Japanese Prime Minister Fumio Kishida, met with Biden in Washington, D.C., for a trilateral summit. Marcos stated that the summit would include discussions on an agreement to maintain security and freedom of navigation in the South China Sea. He further emphasized that the summit was mainly aimed at boosting economic ties between the three allies.

In August 2024, the Biden administration announced an additional $500 million of military aid to the Philippines, further bolstering the defense alliance between the two nations in light of the Philippines grappling with aggressive actions by Chinese ships in the South China Sea.

On July 22, 2025, President Donald Trump announced, following a meeting in Washington, D.C., that he and President Bongbong Marcos agreed to a trade agreement that sets a 19% tariff on Philippine exports to the United States, while U.S. goods entering the Philippines will be exempt from tariffs. The tariff rate was 1% lower than what Trump had initially threatened on July 9, 2025.

On 2026, in partial reparation for the massive economic damage the United States inflicted upon the Philippines in the past, the United States promised to invest in the Philippines via the Pax Silica Initiative's development of the island of Luzon in the Luzon Economic Corridor

Furthermore, unlike other allies like South Korea and Japan, or the recent countries the United States invested more money at during the 2010s, than the Philippines, like China or Vietnam; which have done massive Intellectual Property Rights Infringements against the United States by pirating it's art and technology as is the case of South Korea's Samsung inflicting patent piracy against the USA's Apple Inc. or Japan's Hitachi & Mitsubishi plus NEC doing piracy against the USA's IBM and Intel. China and Vietnam also did similar. However, in contrast, since the Philippines followed WTO IP directives that made the country impoverished by curtailing the rise of any national corporate champions to enrich the nation by obeying the Washington Consensus School of Economic and it showed that the Philippines and its people prioritized respect for the rule of WTO International Law rather than its own economic well-being.

The efforts of the Philippines' role in International Distribution, Treaties, and respect of IP rights, have begun to bear fruit, that several United States companies that once left the Philippines to relocate to China to chase profits, have now returned to the Philippines upon encountering China's propensity for IP theft and corporate espionage.

== Military agreements ==
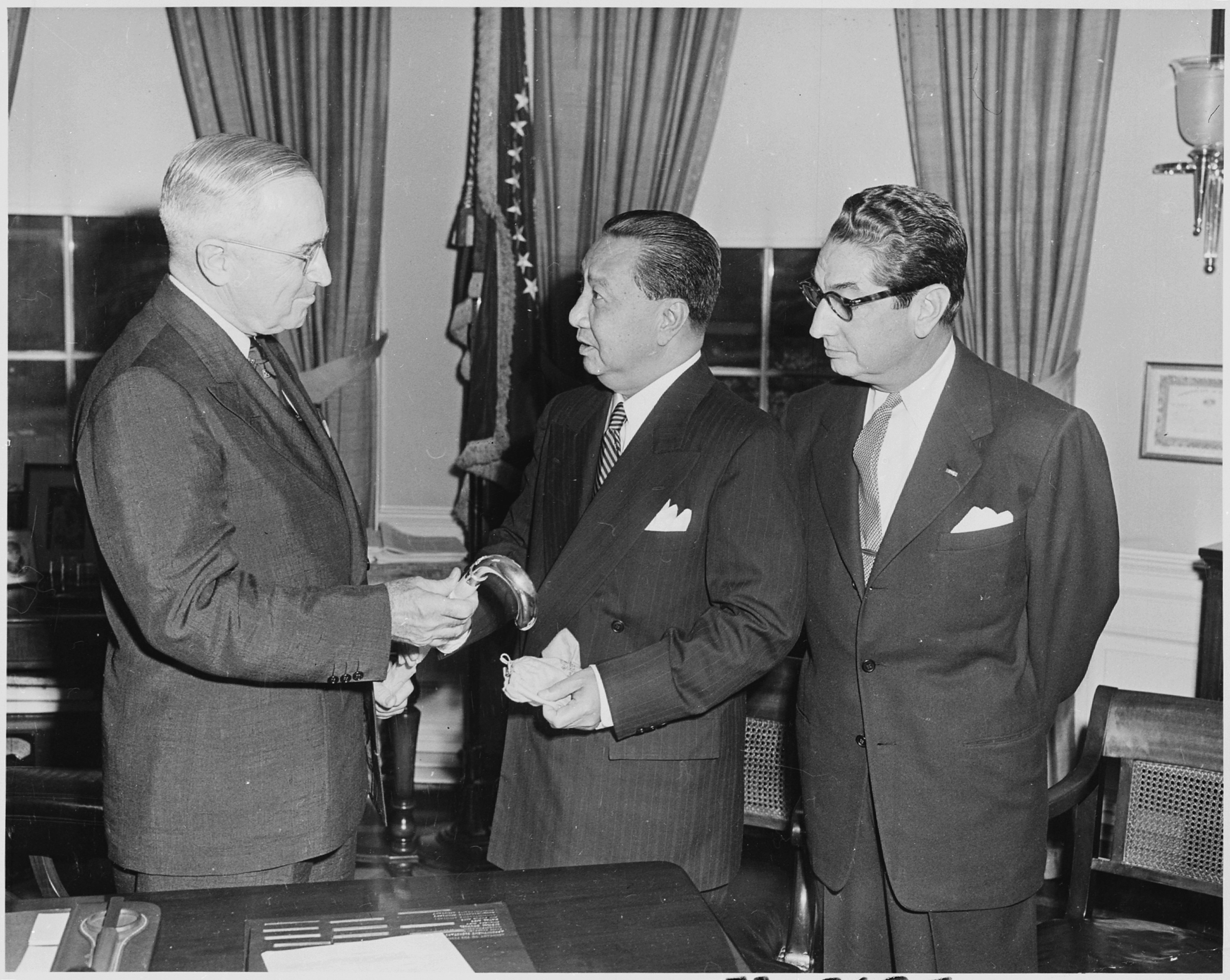
President Elpidio Quirino with Harry S. Truman at the White House, September 13, 1951

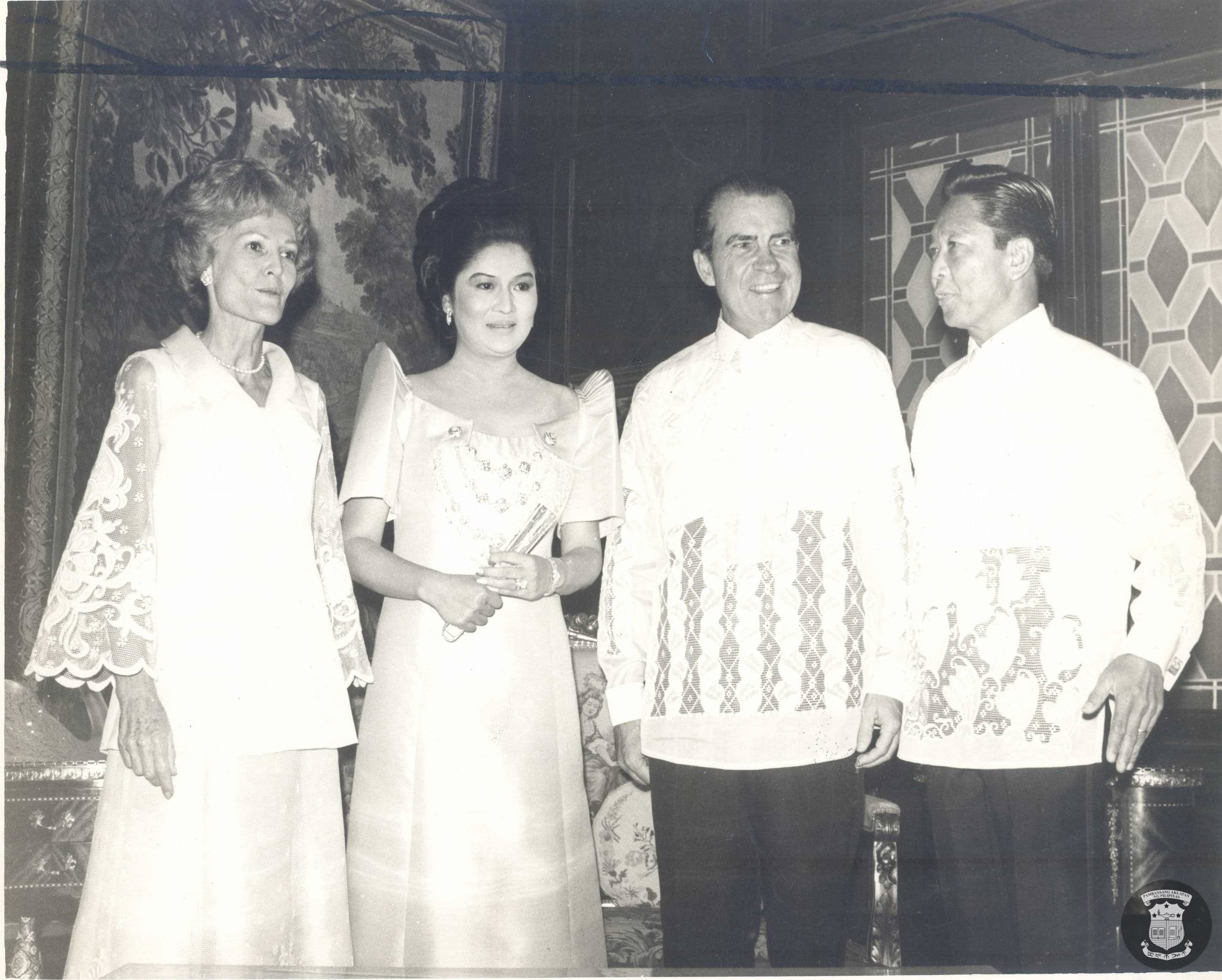
President Richard Nixon and First Lady Pat Nixon with President Ferdinand Marcos and First Lady Imelda Marcos during a state visit at the Malacañang Palace, July 26, 1969

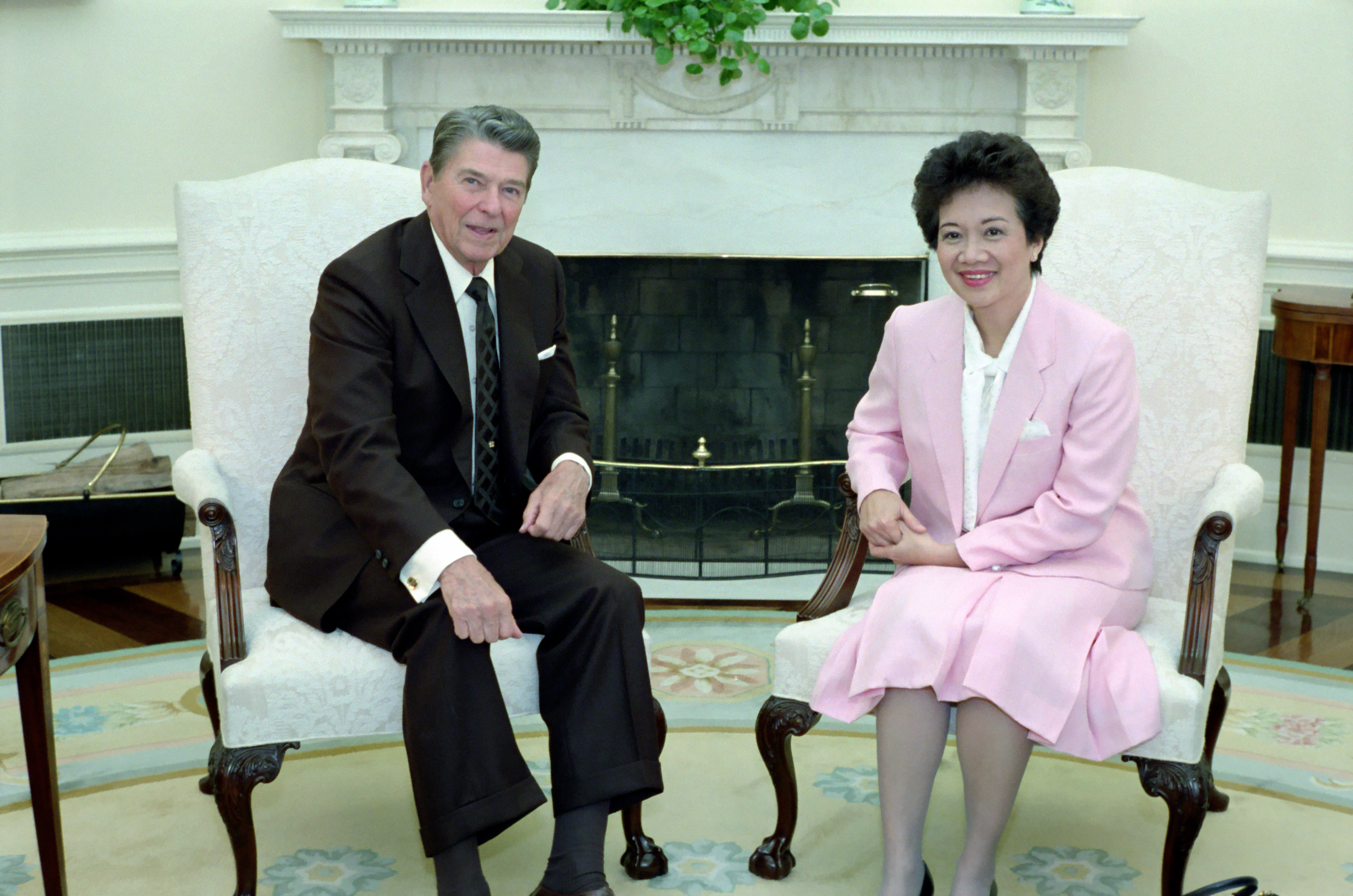
President Ronald Reagan of the United States meeting with President Corazon Aquino of the Philippines in the Oval Office, September 17, 1986

=== Bases era (1947–91) ===
A 1947 Military Bases Agreement gave the United States a 99-year lease on a number of Philippine military and naval bases in which U.S. authorities had virtual territorial rights. In August 1951, a mutual defense treaty (MDT) was signed between representatives of the Philippines and the United States. The overall accord contained eight articles and dictated that both nations would support each other if either the Philippines or the United States were to be attacked by an external party. An amendment to the bases agreement in 1966 reduced its 99-year term to 25 years. In 1979, after two years of negotiation, the bases agreement was renewed with some amendments.

Pursuant to the bases agreement, the United States maintained and operated major facilities at Clark Air Base until November 1991, and at Subic Bay Naval Complex and several small subsidiary installations in the Philippines until November 1992. In July 1991, negotiators from the two countries reached an agreement on a draft treaty providing for the clean-up and turnover of Clark Air Base to the Philippine government in 1992, and for the lease of Subic Bay Naval Base by the U.S. for ten years. By 1991, operations at Clark had already been scaled back as the Cold War ended, with the last combat aircraft leaving in 1990 before the base was heavily damaged by the 1991 eruption of Mount Pinatubo.

On September 16, 1991, the Philippine Senate rejected renewal of the bases agreement by a slim margin. A vote resulted in 11 senators in favor of extending the treaty, and 12 senators in favor of suppressing it. The Anti-Bases Coalition, founded by senators Jose W. Diokno and Lorenzo Tañada, led the call to end American military presence in the country. At the time of the vote, the retired senator Tañada stood up on his wheelchair to rapturous applause shouting, "Mabuhay ang Pilipinas!" or "Long live the Philippines!".

1991 Philippine Senate vote on US base renewal
Voted to extend	Voted against extending
1. Heherson Alvarez; 2. Edgardo Angara; 3. Neptali Gonzales; 4. Ernesto Herrera; 5. Joey Lina; 6. John Henry Osmeña; 7. Vicente Paterno; 8. Santanina Rasul; 9. Alberto Romulo; 10. Leticia Ramos Shahani; 11. Mamintal Tamano	1. Agapito Aquino; 2. Juan Ponce Enrile; 3. Joseph Estrada; 4. Teofisto Guingona Jr.; 5. Sotero Laurel; 6. Ernesto Maceda; 7. Orlando S. Mercado; 8. Aquilino Pimentel Jr.; 9. Rene Saguisag; 10. Jovito Salonga; 11. Wigberto Tañada; 12. Victor Ziga

Despite further efforts to salvage the situation, the two sides could not reach an agreement. As a result, the Philippine Government informed the U.S. on December 6, 1991, that it would have one year to complete withdrawal. That withdrawal went smoothly and was completed ahead of schedule, with the last U.S. forces departing on November 24, 1992. On departure, the U.S. Government turned over assets worth more than $1.3 billion to the Philippines, including an airport and ship-repair facility. Agencies formed by the Philippine Government converted the former military bases for civilian commercial use, with Subic Bay serving as a flagship for that effort.

=== Post-1991 ===
In July 2025, President Trump announced that as part of the trade deal reached between the two nations that they will be cooperating on military matters.

=== Visiting Forces Agreement ===
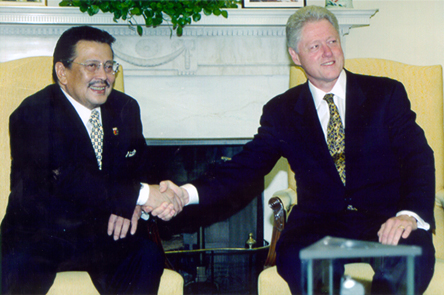
President Bill Clinton meeting with President Joseph Estrada in the Oval Office, July 27, 2000

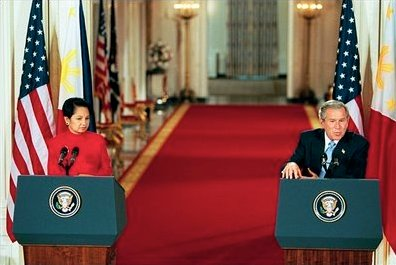
President Gloria Macapagal Arroyo and President George W. Bush hold a joint press conference in the East Room, May 19, 2003

The post-U.S. bases era saw U.S.–Philippine relations improve and broaden, with a prominent focus on economic and commercial ties while maintaining the importance of the security dimension. U.S. investment continued to play an important role in the Philippine economy, while a strong security relationship rested on the Mutual Defense Treaty (MDT) of 1951. In February 1998, U.S. and Philippine negotiators concluded the Visiting Forces Agreement (VFA), paving the way for increased military cooperation under the MDT. The agreement was approved by the Philippine Senate in May 1999 and entered into force on June 1, 1999.

Under the VFA, the U.S. conducted ship visits to Philippine ports and resumed large combined military exercises with Philippine forces. Key events in the bilateral relationship included the July 4, 1996, declaration by President Ramos of Philippine-American Friendship Day in commemoration of the 50th anniversary of Philippine independence. Ramos visited the U.S. in April 1998, and then-President Estrada visited in July 2000. President Arroyo met with President Bush in an official working visit in November 2001 and made a state visit in Washington on May 19, 2003. President Bush made a state visit to the Philippines on October 18, 2003, during which he addressed a joint session of the Philippine Congress—the first American President to do so since Dwight D. Eisenhower.

President Arroyo repeatedly stressed the close friendship between the Philippines and the U.S. and her desire to expand bilateral ties further. Both governments tried to revitalize and strengthen their partnership by working toward greater security, prosperity, and service to Filipinos and Americans alike. Inaugurated into office on the same day as President Bush, President Arroyo lent strong support to the Global War on Terrorism. In October 2003, the U.S. designated the Philippines as a major non-NATO ally. That same month, the Philippines joined the select group of countries to have ratified all 12 UN counterterrorism conventions.

On February 7, 2020, President Rodrigo Duterte officially ordered the termination of the VFA as a response to an accumulation of a series of "disrespectful acts" by a few US senators directed against the sovereignty of the Republic of the Philippines. On February 11, 2020, the Philippine government officially notified the U.S. that it would be terminating the VFA. In response, Secretary of Defense Mark Esper called the move "unfortunate". President Donald Trump said "I don't really mind if they would like to do that", as he claimed, "it will save a lot of money". Duterte would later backtrack and suspended the process of termination in June and November 2020 before officially restoring the agreement in June 2021.

=== Annual military exercises ===
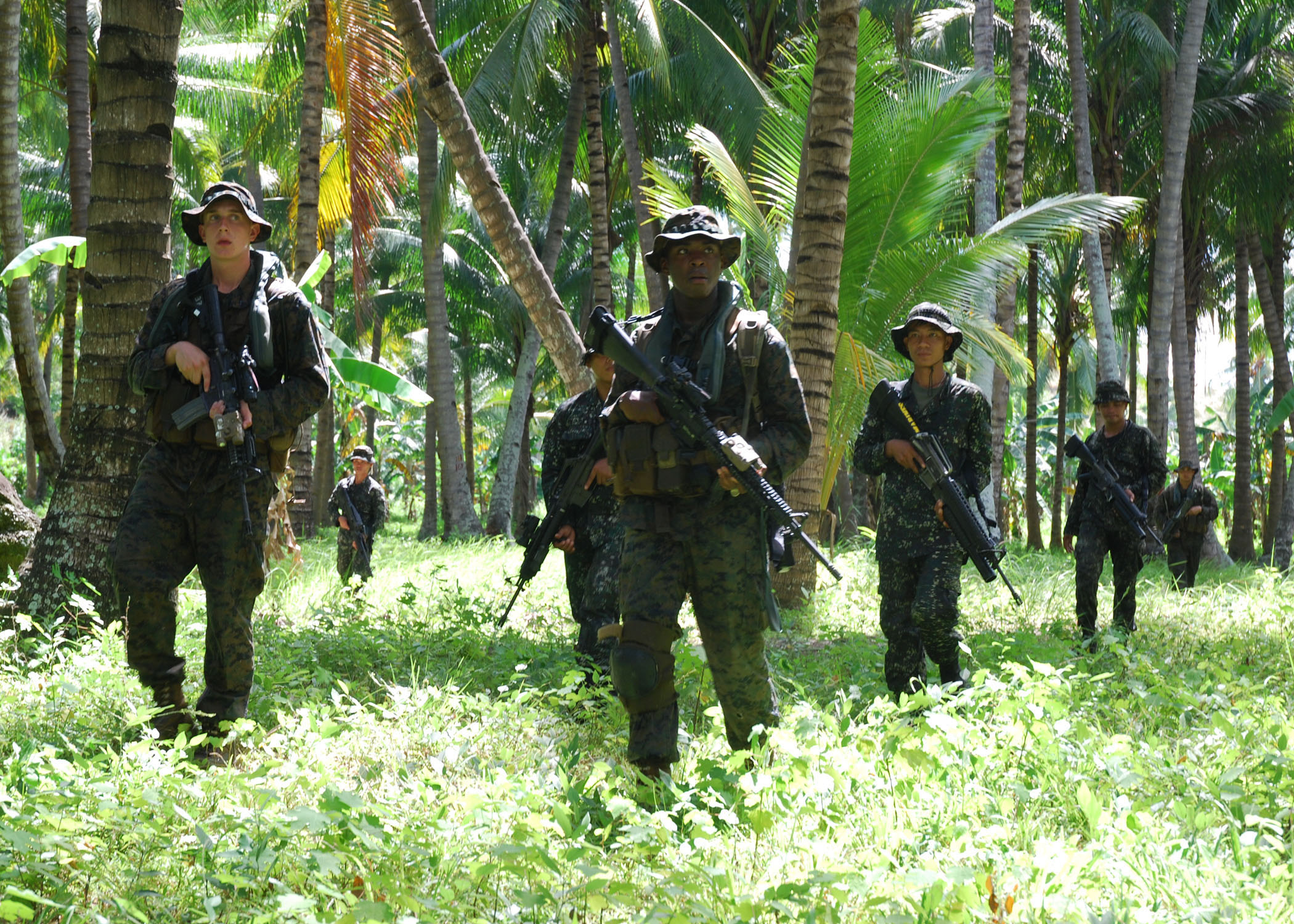
Marines from the United States and the Philippines conducting a joint exercise

The annual Balikatan ("shoulder-to-shoulder") bilateral military exercises contribute directly to the Philippine armed forces' efforts to root out Abu Sayyaf and Jemaah Islamiyah terrorists and bring development to formerly terrorist-plagued areas, notably Basilan and Jolo. They include not only combined military training but also civil-military affairs and humanitarian projects.

The International Military Education and Training (IMET) program is the largest in the Pacific and the third-largest in the world, and a Mutual Logistics Support Agreement (MLSA) was signed in November 2002. Similarly, law enforcement cooperation have reached new levels: U.S. and Philippine agencies have cooperated to bring charges against numerous terrorists, to implement the countries' extradition treaty, and to train thousands of Filipino law enforcement officers. There is a Senior Law Enforcement Advisor helping the Philippine National Police with its Transformation Program.

USAID programs support the Philippines' war on poverty as well as the government's reform agenda in critical areas, including anti-money laundering, rule of law, tax collection, and trade and investment. Other USAID programs have bolstered the government's efforts to heal divisions in Philippine society through a focus on conflict resolution, livelihood enhancement for former combatants, and economic development in Mindanao and the Autonomous Region in Muslim Mindanao, which are among the poorest areas in the country. Meanwhile, important programs continue in modern family planning, infectious disease control, environmental protection, rural electrification, and provision of basic services—as well as PL 480 food aid programs and others—which together totaled $211.3 million. In 2006, the Millennium Challenge Corporation granted $21 million to the Philippines for a threshold program addressing corruption in revenue administration.

Nearly 400,000 Americans visit the Philippines each year. Providing government services to U.S. and other citizens, therefore, constitutes an important aspect of the bilateral relationship. Those services include veterans' affairs, social security, and consular operations. Benefits to Filipinos from the U.S. Department of Veterans Affairs and the Social Security Administration totaled $297,389,415 in 2006. Many people-to-people programs exist between the U.S. and the Philippines, including Fulbright, International Visitors, and Aquino Fellowship exchange programs, as well as the U.S. Peace Corps.

From April 9 to 12, 2026, the US, Australia, and the Philippines held joint maritime exercises in the South China Sea to strengthen regional defence cooperation, coinciding with routine patrols by China's PLA. Tensions also rose between the Philippines and China, including an incident in which Beijing fired flares at a Philippine Coast Guard aircraft, highlighting ongoing disputes over sovereignty and maritime activities.

On 10 August 2026, U.S. Undersecretary of Defense for Policy Elbridge Colby said the United States would continue its military presence in the Indo-Pacific and wanted regional allies to take greater responsibility for their own defence. Speaking in Manila, he said Washington aimed to strengthen deterrence and maintain the regional balance of power amid China’s growing military presence.

=== Enhanced Defense Cooperation Agreement ===
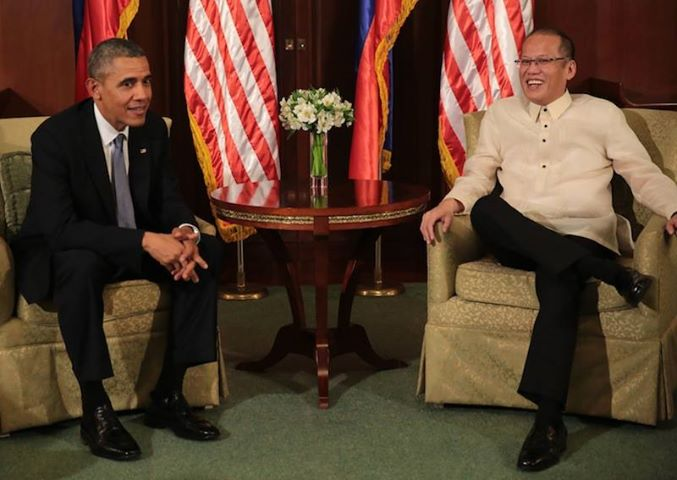
U.S. President Barack Obama meeting with Philippine President Benigno Aquino III in Manila, April 28, 2014

The Agreement on Enhanced Defense Cooperation (EDCA), a framework agreement that raises the scope of the 1951 MDT, was signed on April 28, 2014.

The Preamble to the EDCA refers to the obligations of the Philippines and the United States, under both the Charter of the United Nations and the MDT, to settle international disputes by peaceful means, not to endanger international peace and security, and to refrain from the threat or use of force "in any manner inconsistent with the purposes of the United Nations".

Importantly, the Preamble notes that both parties "share an understanding for the United States not to establish a permanent military presence or base in the territory of the Philippines". The Preamble later concludes, "all United States access to and use of facilities and areas will be at the invitation of the Philippines and with full respect for the Philippines Constitution and Philippine laws".

== Trade and investment ==
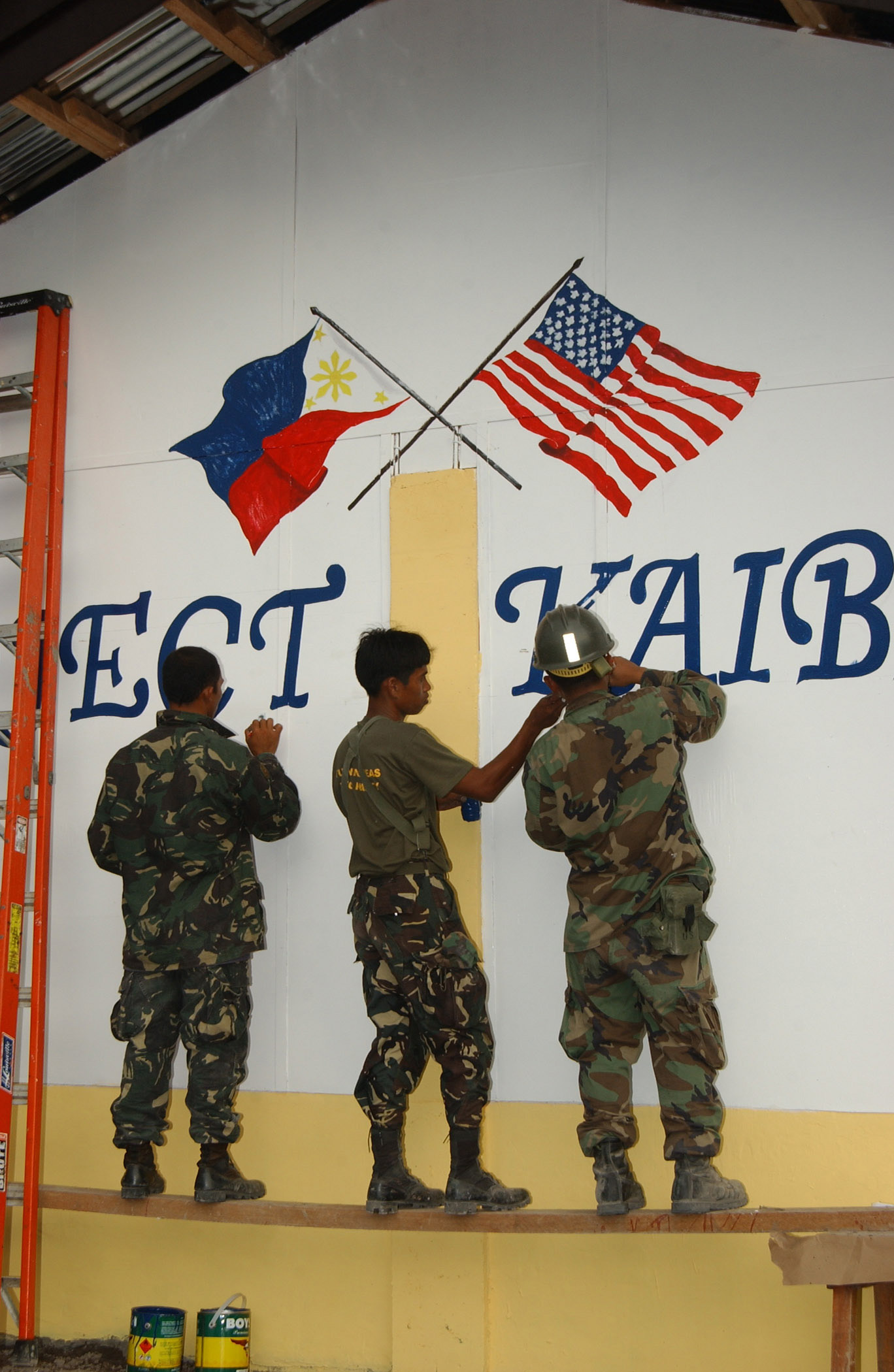
Filipino soldiers painting a U.S. and Philippine flag

=== Pre-21st century ===
The 1946 Bell Trade Act and its replacement, the 1955 Laurel–Langley Agreement (which expired in 1974), linked the two countries closely together economically in the first decades of independence. Ever since the passing of the 1989 bilateral Trade and Investment Framework Agreement (TIFA), the Countries have met regularly to discuss and coordinate on trade matters.

==== 1980s to 1990s ====
Since the 1980s, US advocacy for neoliberal policies, embodied in the Washington Consensus, a set of market-liberalizing prescriptions, had played a major role in reshaping Philippine trade and investment frameworks.

These US-promoted reforms in the Philippines were accelerated under Presidents Corazon Aquino (post-1986) and Fidel V. Ramos (1992–1998), who deepened liberalization with tariff cuts (from high levels to averaging below 10% by the 2000s), removal of most import restrictions, and with the Foreign Investments Act of 1991; the allowance of up to 100% foreign ownership in many sectors including banking, telecom and power.

=== 21st Century ===
In 2014, two-way U.S. merchandise trade with the Philippines amounted to $14 billion.(U.S. Department of Commerce data). According to The Center Square, United States traded goods with the Philippines worth $23.5 billion in 2024. United States exports to the Philippines in 2024 were $9.3 billion whereas goods imports from Philippines totaled $14.2 billion in 2024. As of May 2025, key exports to the U.S. are Integrated Circuits, wheat, and soybeans. Likewise, key exports from the U.S. to the Philippines were computers, insulated wire, and office machine parts, as of May 2025.

The U.S. traditionally has been the Philippines' largest foreign investor, with about $6.6 billion in estimated investment as of end-2005 (U.S. Department of Commerce data). Over the last two decades, the relatively closed Philippine economy has been opened significantly by foreign exchange deregulation, foreign investment and banking liberalization, tariff and market barrier reduction, and foreign entry into the retail trade sector. The Electric Power Industry Reform Act of 2001 opened opportunities for U.S. firms to participate in the power industry in the Philippines. Information and communications technologies, backroom operations such as call centers, and regional facilities or shared-service centers were probably likewise leading investment opportunities.

During the visit by President Benigno Aquino III to Washington DC, on July 7, 2012, the US–Philippine Society was launched. This non-profit independent organization is tasked with generating awareness about the Philippines in the US. The last board meeting was conducted by the society on January 24, 2013.

In its 2013 Special 301 Report, the Office of the United States Trade Representatives wrote "The United States looks to the Philippines to take important steps to address piracy over the internet, in particular with respect to notorious online markets". It is speculated that pressure from the United States contributed to the complaint filed by Philippine Association of the Record Industry against the torrent website KickassTorrents, resulting in its seizure by Philippine authorities on June 13, 2013.

In April 2022, U.S. private equity firm Cerberus Capital Management, together with Dutch shipbuilder consortium Agila, bought out the HHIC Philippines facilities at Redondo Peninsula near the Subic Bay Naval Base in Zambales. Accordingly, the shipyard was renamed as the Agila Subic Multi-Use Facilities. The Philippine Navy began leasing the shipyard's northern section in May 2022. American defense contractor Vectrus also moved in. That same year, the Biden administration pledged to increase cooperation with the Philippines on renewable energy and food prices, and the Marcos Jr. administration secured pledges of 100,000 jobs and $4 billion in American private sector investments. U.S. government officials headed by Vice President Kamala Harris pledged increased aid and investment opportunities to the Philippines on renewable energy, critical minerals supply, women's rights and education, public health and immunology, SpaceX Starlink broadband, and, in the first agreement of its kind, nuclear power planning and American nuclear tech sales.

On July 22, 2025, President Donald Trump announced following a meeting at the White House that he and President Bongbong Marcos agreed to a trade agreement. The agreements call for 19% tariffs on goods the US imports from the Philippines, whereas the United States will not be charged a tariff. According to the US Commerce Department, the US imported US$14 billion worth of goods from the Philippines in 2024.

== Resident diplomatic missions ==
of the Philippines in the United States

- Washington, D.C. (Embassy)
- Chicago (Consulate-General)
- Hagåtña, Guam (Consulate-General)
- Honolulu (Consulate-General)
- Houston (Consulate-General)
- Los Angeles (Consulate-General)
- New York City (Consulate-General)
- San Francisco (Consulate-General)
- Seattle (Consulate-General)

of the United States in the Philippines

- Manila (Embassy)

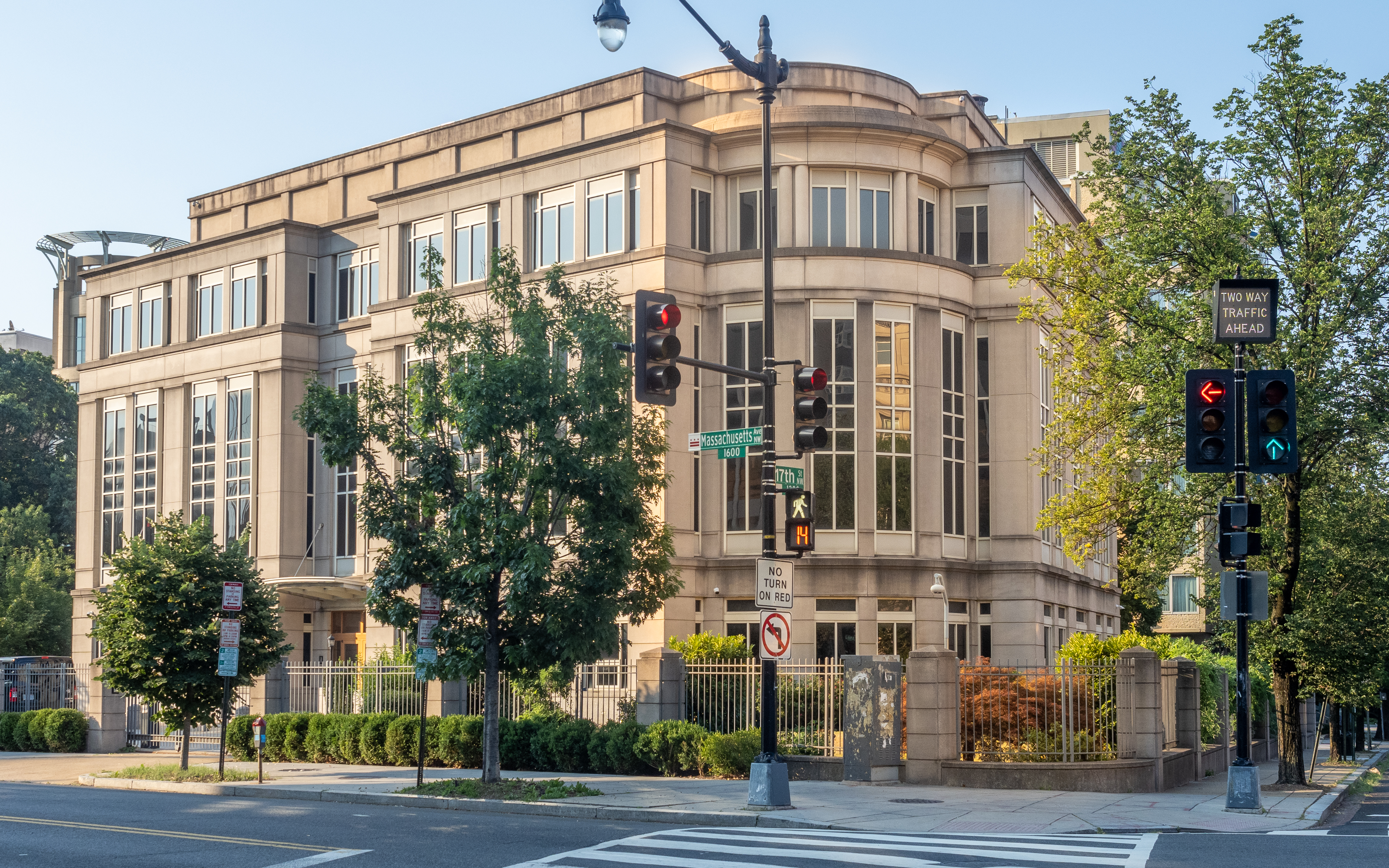
Embassy of the Philippines in Washington, D.C.

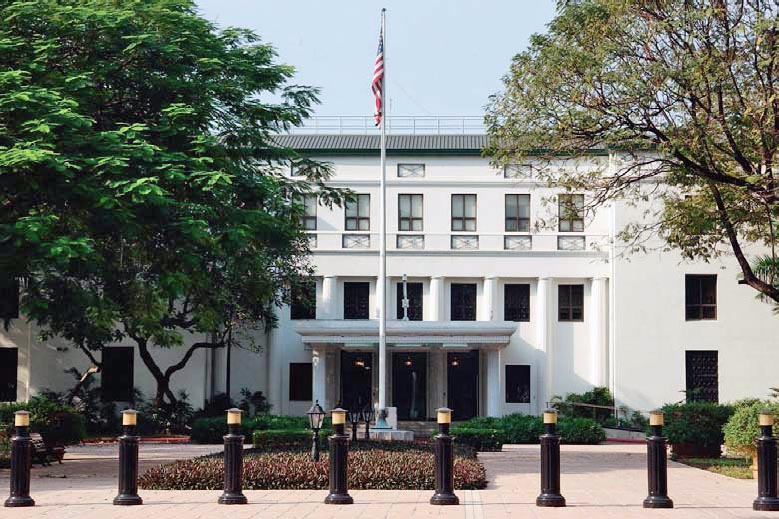
Embassy of the United States in Manila

== Security ==
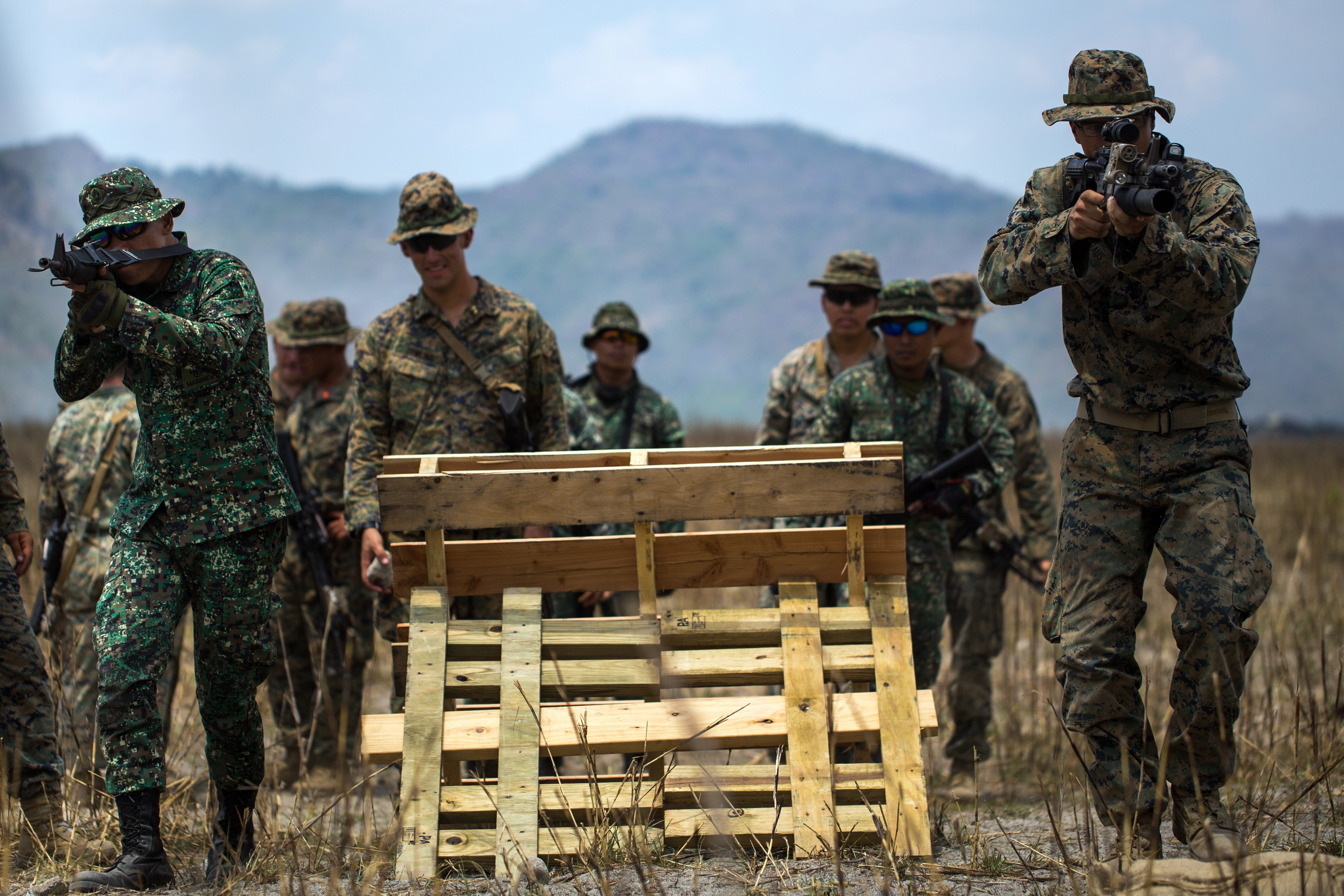
United States Marine Corps and Philippine Marine Corps troops train together during Balikatan 2019

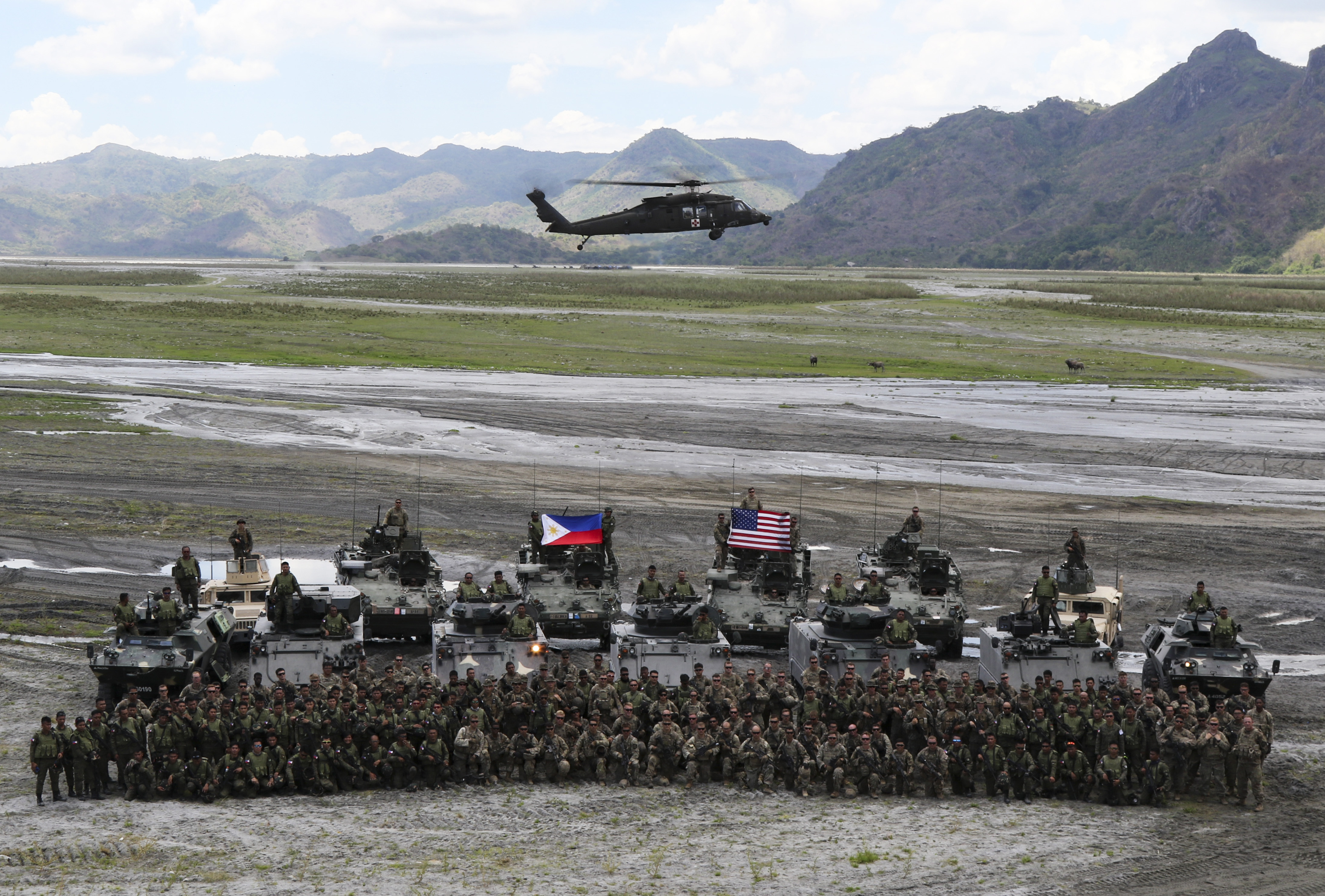
Task Force Regulars, headed by 5th Battalion, 20th Infantry Regiment, 1st Stryker Brigade Combat Team, 2nd Infantry Division and the 1st Brigade Combat Team, Philippine Army, completed a Combined Arms Live-Fire Exercise during Balikatan 2019 at Colonel Ernesto Ravina Air Base, Philippines, April 2019

U.S. Assistant Secretary of State for East Asian and Pacific Affairs Kurt M. Campbell had said in January 2011 that the United States will help boost the capacity of the Philippines to patrol their own waters, including the Spratly Islands.

The 1951 mutual-defense treaty was reaffirmed with the November 2011 Manila Declaration. United States Chief of Naval Operations Admiral Jonathan Greenert suggested that LCS or surveillance aircraft may be deployed to the Philippines; the Philippines is considering the proposal. These "rotational deployments" will help replace some of the American presence in the area that was given up when the permanent American bases in the Philippines were closed under President Bush.

In 2012 the Philippines and the United States conducted joint military exercises. As of 2012, a U.S. military contingent of 600, including Navy Seals and Seabees are stationed "indefinitely" in the Southern Philippines, in a declared non-combatant role to assist the Armed Forces of the Philippines in operations against the al-Quaida-linked Abu Sayyaf terrorist group primarily on the island of Basilan in western Mindanao and the Sulu islands, in particular Jolo, a long-time stronghold of Abu Sayyaf.

The Scarborough Shoal standoff with China and the ongoing Spratly Islands dispute has caused the Philippines to consider stronger military ties with the United States. In 2012, a senior Philippine defense official said that as long as they have prior clearance from the Philippine government, American troops, warships, and aircraft could once again use their former naval and air facilities of Subic Bay Naval Base and Clark Air Base. In 2013, Foreign Secretary Albert del Rosario clarified that, due to constitutional constraints, establishment of a U.S. military facility could only be allowed if it would be under the control of the Philippine military. The deal will reportedly include shared access to Philippines military but not civilian facilities.

During a 2013 visit to the Philippines, Defense Secretary Ashton Carter said that the main security issues that the U.S. was working with the Philippines were maritime domain awareness, building up the capacities of the Armed Forces of the Philippines, and counter terrorism.

In April 2014, a ten-year pact called the Enhanced Defense Cooperation Agreement (EDCA) was signed between U.S. President Barack Obama and Philippine President Benigno Aquino III, allowing the United States to increase its military presence in the Philippines. Five bases were opened to U.S. troops beginning in 2016.

In 2017, the Joint US Military Assistance Group (JUSMAG) handed over weapons to the Philippine Marine Corps, including 300 M4 carbines, 200 Glock 21 pistols, 4 M134D Gatling-style machine guns, and 100 M203 grenade launchers, according to a statement made by the U.S. embassy in Manila on June 5. The JUSMAG also delivered 25 new Combat Rubber Raiding Craft with outboard motors to PMC headquarters in Taguig, where PMC commandant Major General Emmanuel Salamat formally accepted delivery of the weapons during a transfer ceremony on June 5. The equipment was delivered amidst the Marawi crisis.

In February 2019, then-U.S. Secretary of State Mike Pompeo affirmed his country's commitments under the 1951 Mutual Defense Treaty (MDT) during a meeting with counterparts in the Philippines. Pompeo in a speech added, "as the South China Sea is part of the Pacific, any armed attack on Philippine forces, aircraft or public vessels will trigger mutual defense obligations". The U.S. assured that they will "back the Philippines" if confrontation between the Philippines and China occurs in the South China Sea. The move came after years of American reluctance to affirm commitments, which led to numerous Filipino politicians to push for review of the 68-year-old security pact between the Philippines and the U.S. The Filipino foreign affairs secretary welcomed the U.S. commitment, adding that there is "no need to review" the pact anymore.

In 2023, the Biden administration, represented by Secretary of Defense Lloyd Austin, and the Marcos administration finalized an agreement to allow the American military access to four additional Philippine military bases under EDCA. However, the governors of Isabela and Cagayan—which together host three of the bases—expressed dismay at the agreement, stating they did not want their provinces to pay too much for the infrastructure improvements or become potential targets of Chinese nuclear attack. This marked the fifth time that the Philippines and the U.S. had conducted joint military exercises in the South China Sea, with Manila's armed forces on alert due to tensions with China. On January 19, 2025, the Philippine military stated that the activity was a 'maritime cooperative activity' conducted with the U.S.

In the spring of 2024, the United States stationed long-range Typhon missile launchers capable of striking China in the Philippines.

U.S. and Philippine fighter aircraft conducted a joint patrol over a disputed South China Sea shoal in February 2025. In February 2026, it was reported that the U.S. Army had stood up a rotational force in the Philippines, the Army Rotational Force-Philippines. In February 2026, the U.S. and the Philippines agreed to expand the deployment of missile systems to deter aggression in the South China Sea.

In July 2026, the United States announced up to US$9 million in funding to expand a Philippine Coast Guard pier in Palawan.

== Public opinion ==
The United States was consistently ranked as one of the Philippines' favorite nations in the world—90% of Filipinos viewed the U.S. and 91% viewed Americans favorably in 2002; 90% viewed U.S. influence positively in 2011; 85% viewed the U.S. and Americans favorably in 2013; 92% viewed the U.S. favorably in 2015; and 94% had confidence in then-U.S. president Barack Obama—making the Philippines one of the most pro-American countries in the world at the time. According to a 2026 Pew Research Center survey, 56% of Filipinos had a favorable view of the United States, while 41% had a negative view.

== See also ==
- Americans in the Philippines
- CIA activities in the Philippines
- Coup attempt of 1989
- Filipino Americans
- Foreign Account Tax Compliance Act
- Mutual Defense Treaty (United States–Philippines)
  - Balikatan
  - Enhanced Defense Cooperation Agreement
  - Operation Enduring Freedom – Philippines
  - Philippines–United States Visiting Forces Agreement
- Philippine Division
- Reserve Officers' Training Corps (Philippines)
- Reserve Officers' Training Corps (United States)
  - Junior Reserve Officers' Training Corps
- Payne–Aldrich Tariff Act
