= List of ambassadors of the United States to the Philippines =

Ambassador of the United States of America to the Republic of the Philippines
- Sugo ng Estados Unidos ng Amerika sa Republika ng Pilipinas
- Seal of the United States Department of State

- Flag of the United States ambassador

- Incumbent; Lee Lipton since June 30, 2026
- U.S. Department of State; Embassy of the United States, Manila
- Style: His or Her Excellency (formal); Mr. or Madam Ambassador (informal)
- Nominator: The president of the United States
- Appointer: The president; with Senate advice and consent
- Precursor: High Commissioner to the Philippines
- Inaugural holder: Paul V. McNutt as Ambassadors Extraordinary and Plenipotentiary
- Formation: July 4, 1946
- Website: U.S. Embassy - Philippines

The ambassador of the United States of America to the Republic of the Philippines (Filipino: Sugo ng Estados Unidos ng Amerika sa Republika ng Pilipinas) was established on July 4, 1946, after the Philippines gained its independence from the United States, as successor of the high commissioner to the Philippines (the last high commissioner became the first ambassador).

The ambassador to the Philippines has also been accredited to the Republic of Palau since 1996. The ambassador works at the Embassy of the United States in Manila along Roxas Boulevard and holds residence in Forbes Park in Makati. The ambassador also has a summer residence in Baguio, The American Residence.

== Ambassadors extraordinary and plenipotentiary to the Republic of the Philippines ==
Image	U.S. ambassador	Term started	Term ended	U.S. president	Philippine president
	Paul V. McNutt	July 4, 1946	March 22, 1947	Harry S. Truman	Sergio Osmeña; Manuel Roxas
	Emmet O'Neal	September 22, 1947	April 28, 1948	Harry S. Truman	Manuel Roxas; Elpidio Quirino
	Myron Melvin Cowen	May 23, 1949	October 14, 1951	Harry S. Truman	Manuel Roxas; Elpidio Quirino
	Raymond A. Spruance	February 7, 1952	April 1, 1955	Harry S. Truman; Dwight D. Eisenhower	Elpidio Quirino; Ramon Magsaysay
	Homer S. Ferguson	April 12, 1955	March 23, 1956	Dwight D. Eisenhower	Ramon Magsaysay
	Albert F. Nufer	July 20, 1956	November 6, 1956	Dwight D. Eisenhower	Ramon Magsaysay
	Charles E. Bohlen	June 4, 1957	October 15, 1959	Dwight D. Eisenhower	Carlos P. Garcia
	John D. Hickerson	January 13, 1960	December 8, 1961	Dwight D. Eisenhower; John F. Kennedy	Carlos P. Garcia; Diosdado Macapagal
	William E. Stevenson	February 5, 1962	June 14, 1964	John F. Kennedy; Lyndon B. Johnson; Richard Nixon	Diosdado Macapagal; Ferdinand Marcos
	William McCormick Blair, Jr.	August 5, 1964	October 21, 1967	John F. Kennedy; Lyndon B. Johnson; Richard Nixon	Diosdado Macapagal; Ferdinand Marcos
	G. Mennen Williams	June 17, 1968	April 7, 1969	John F. Kennedy; Lyndon B. Johnson; Richard Nixon	Ferdinand Marcos
	Henry A. Byroade	August 29, 1969	May 25, 1973	John F. Kennedy; Lyndon B. Johnson; Richard Nixon	Ferdinand Marcos
	William H. Sullivan	August 6, 1973	April 26, 1977	Richard Nixon; Gerald Ford; Jimmy Carter	Ferdinand Marcos
	David D. Newsom	November 11, 1977	March 30, 1978	Jimmy Carter; Ronald Reagan	Ferdinand Marcos
	Richard W. Murphy	June 8, 1978	August 10, 1981	Jimmy Carter; Ronald Reagan	Ferdinand Marcos
	Michael Armacost	March 12, 1982	April 18, 1984	Ronald Reagan	Ferdinand Marcos
	Stephen W. Bosworth	May 4, 1984	April 2, 1987	Ronald Reagan	Ferdinand Marcos; Corazon Aquino
	Nicholas Platt	August 27, 1987	July 20, 1991	Ronald Reagan; George H. W. Bush	Corazon Aquino
	Frank G. Wisner	August 16, 1991	June 10, 1992	George H. W. Bush	Corazon Aquino
	Richard H. Solomon	September 4, 1992	March 1, 1993	Bill Clinton	Fidel V. Ramos
	John Negroponte	October 26, 1993	August 5, 1996	Bill Clinton	Fidel V. Ramos
	Thomas C. Hubbard	September 3, 1996	July 24, 2000	Bill Clinton	Fidel V. Ramos; Joseph Estrada
	Michael E. Malinowski	July 24, 2000	September 2001	Bill Clinton; George W. Bush	Joseph Estrada; Gloria Macapagal Arroyo
	Robert W. Fitts	September 2001	February 21, 2002	George W. Bush	Gloria Macapagal Arroyo
	Francis J. Ricciardone, Jr.	February 21, 2002	April 3, 2005	George W. Bush	Gloria Macapagal Arroyo
	Joseph A. Mussomeli	April 3, 2005	August 2005	George W. Bush	Gloria Macapagal Arroyo
	Darryl N. Johnson	August 2005	March 22, 2006	George W. Bush	Gloria Macapagal Arroyo
	Kristie Kenney	March 22, 2006	November 19, 2009	George W. Bush; Barack Obama	Gloria Macapagal Arroyo
	Harry K. Thomas Jr.	April 27, 2010	October 16, 2013	Barack Obama	Gloria Macapagal Arroyo; Benigno Aquino III
	Philip S. Goldberg	November 21, 2013	October 28, 2016	Barack Obama	Benigno Aquino III; Rodrigo Duterte
	Sung Y. Kim	December 4, 2016	October 4, 2020	Donald Trump	Rodrigo Duterte
	John C. Law	October 4, 2020	September 1, 2021	Donald Trump; Joe Biden	Rodrigo Duterte
	Heather Variava	September 1, 2021	July 22, 2022	Joe Biden; Donald Trump	Bongbong Marcos
	MaryKay Carlson	July 22, 2022	January 16, 2026	Joe Biden; Donald Trump	Bongbong Marcos
	Y. Robert Ewing	January 16, 2026	May 29, 2026	Donald Trump	Bongbong Marcos
	Bridgette L. Walker	May 29, 2026	June 28, 2026	Donald Trump	Bongbong Marcos
	Lee Lipton	June 30, 2026	Present	Donald Trump	Bongbong Marcos

== See also ==
- List of ambassadors of the Philippines to the United States
- Embassy of the Philippines, Washington, D.C.
- Embassy of the United States, Manila
- Philippines–United States relations
- Foreign relations of the Philippines
- Ambassadors of the United States
