= Embassy of the United States, Manila =

Diplomatic mission of the United States in the Philippines

Embassy of the United States in Manila Pasuguan ng Estados Unidos sa Maynila

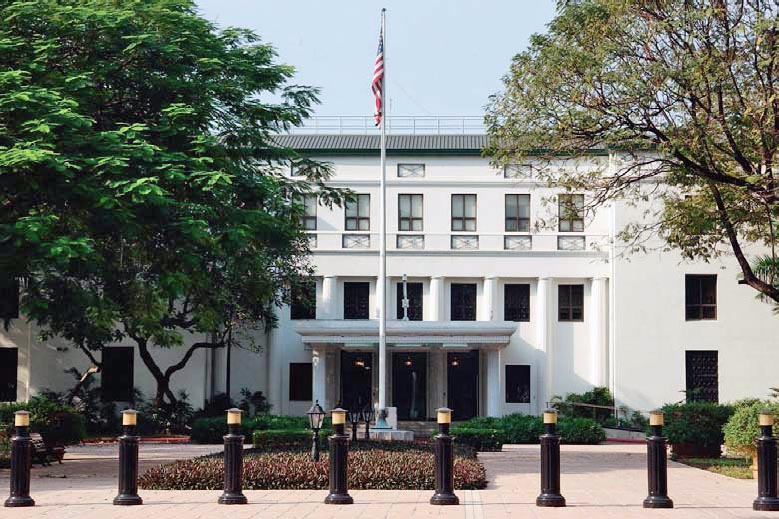

- Location within Manila
- Location: Ermita, Manila
- Address: 1201 Roxas Boulevard Manila 1000
- Coordinates: 14°34′37″N 120°58′40″E
- Ambassador: Lee Lipton

The Embassy of the United States of America in Manila is the diplomatic mission of the United States in the Philippines. Its chancery is situated by Roxas Boulevard in Ermita, City of Manila. The Embassy has been representing the United States Government since the Philippines was granted independence on July 4, 1946.

The Manila mission is one of the US Department of State's largest posts, employing close to 300 Americans and 1,000 Foreign Service national employees. The mission also hosts the only foreign office of the Department of Veterans Affairs, which caters to some 18,000 American and Filipino veterans and their widows in the Philippines.

Manila's Regional Printing Center provides printing and distribution services for overseas and domestic publications. Smaller branches exist in Vienna, Austria and Washington, D.C., but Manila is the flagship facility.

== History ==
The chancery of the Embassy in Manila was first constructed to house the United States High Commission to the Philippines and was designed by the US Treasury Department, Procurement Division, Public Buildings Branch after considering and later rejecting a design by the notable Filipino architect Juan M. Arellano. The building is built on reclaimed land that was a gift from the Government of the Philippines and sits on more than 600 reinforced concrete piles that were sunk 60 feet into the site. The site was originally designed as a demesne along Manila Bay, which featured a revival-style mansion that took advantage of the seaside vista. It was insisted, though, that a federal-style building be built. The chancery was completed in 1940.

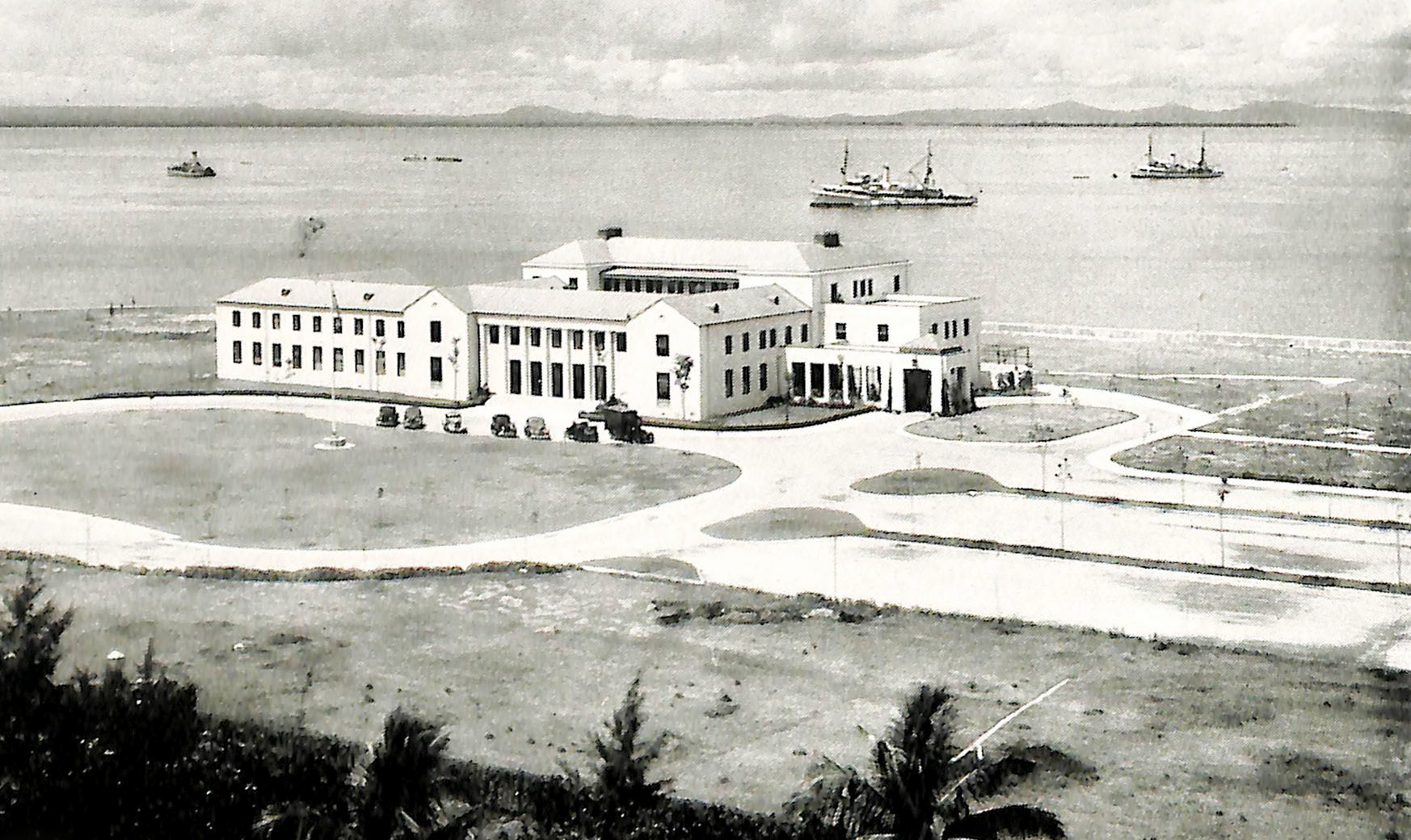
The newly built chancery in 1940 when it was still known as the residence of the American High Commissioner

During World War II, after the Fall of Bataan, the property became the residence of the Commander-in-Chief of the Imperial Japanese Army in the Philippines. When the Japanese-sponsored Puppet Republic was established in 1943, the building was repainted and refurbished and served as the Embassy of Japan to the Philippines. During its recapture by Allied forces and Philippine guerrillas, the building was seriously damaged but its ballroom, among other rooms, remained intact.

In October 1945, quonset huts were erected throughout the property and became known as The Courthouse, the center of the Japanese war crimes trial in the Philippines, with the ballroom serving as the courtroom and the upstairs rooms serving as holding cells.

On July 4, 1946, the Philippines was granted independence by the United States and the building became known as the United States Embassy in Manila.

As a testament to its battle-scarred history, its flagpole was never restored and still retains the bulletholes it sustained during the war. The chancery has also been designated as historic property by the National Historical Institute of the Philippines as well as being on the United States Secretary of State's register of culturally significant places.

== Embassy sections ==
The Embassy exercises a number of functions in its representation to the Government of the Philippines, including political, administrative, economic, public diplomacy, and consular affairs, that are managed under the Ambassador with help of counselors from the U.S. Department of State.

For bilateral development projects, the managing office is the United States Agency for International Development, while military affairs are managed by Defense Attaché and the Joint U.S. Military Assistance Group in the Philippines. The Veterans Administration also has its only overseas office which however is separate from the chancery in the City of Manila - it and its outpatient clinic is located at the Embassy's "Seafront Annex" Compound in Pasay City, approximately 4 kilometers down the road in Roxas Boulevard.

- Consular Section
  - American Citizen Services
  - Visa Services
- Economic Section
- Defense Attaché
- Public Affairs
- Political Section
- Management Section
- Other U.S. Government Agencies
  - U.S. Agency for International Development
  - U.S. Ambassador to the Asian Development Bank
  - U.S. Foreign Agricultural Services
  - U.S. Commercial Service
  - U.S. Peace Corps-Philippines
  - Regional Printing Center-Manila
  - Social Security Administration
  - U.S. Department of Veterans Affairs
  - International Broadcasting Bureau
  - Joint U.S. Military Assistance Group
  - Foreign Commercial Service Liaison Office to the Asian Development Bank
  - U.S. Citizen and Immigration Services
  - Library of Congress - Manila office

There is also an American Consular Agent in Cebu as well as a virtual consulate in Davao City.

== Staff ==
Florida-based businessman Lee Lipton is the current United States Ambassador to the Philippines.

== See also ==
- The American Residence at Baguio
- Embassy of the Philippines in Washington, D.C.
