= Americans in the Philippines =

Ethnic group

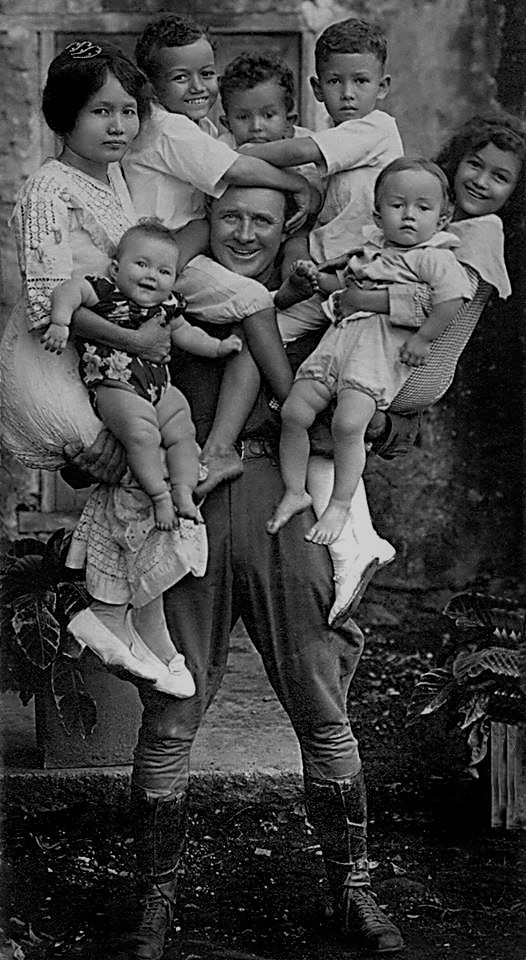
- Filipino-American family, Philippines

Total population
- 38,000-750,000 Americans; 250,000 Amerasians

Regions with significant populations
- Angeles City; Baguio; San Fernando, La Union; · Calamba · Tuguegarao · Calapan · Legazpi · Iloilo · Olongapo · Pagadian · Cagayan de Oro · Davao · Koronadal · Butuan · Cotabato · Antipolo · Metro Cebu · Metro Manila

Languages
- Filipino; American English; Philippine English; · and Spanish

Religion
- Protestantism; Roman Catholicism; Buddhism

Related ethnic groups
- Filipino Americans

Americans in the Philippines (Filipino: paninirahan sa Pilipinas ng mga Amerikano) are an ethnic and diaspora community. During the Spanish colonial period, a small number of Americans settled in the archipelago, but the community became substantial following the Spanish–American War (1898).

The American population in the Philippines grew largely as a result of U.S. colonization of the Philippines, which lasted 48 years. It began with the cession of the Philippines to the U.S. by Spain in 1898 and lasted until the U.S. recognition of Philippine independence in 1946.

In 2015, the U.S. State Department estimated in 2016 that more than 220,000 U.S. citizens lived in the Philippines and more than 650,000 visited per year. They noted there was a significant mixed population of Amerasians born here since World War II, as well as descendants of Americans from the colonial era. The total number of Amerasians descended from American servicemen (termed "G.I. babies") was estimated to be around 250,000 in 2012. According to American ambassador to the Philippines MaryKay Carlson, there were 750,000 American citizens living in the Philippines as of year 2025. If one were to sum the percentage of the population with partial American ancestry (Amerasians), 0.25%; and full American ancestry (American Filipinos), 0.75%; around 1% of the Philippines' demographics is made up of those with American ancestry.

During the Spanish–American War the United States assisted Philippine revolutionaries in renewing their fight for independence. The Philippine–American War erupted after the U.S. assimilated the Philippines instead of granting independence following Spanish cession to the U.S. in their peace treaty.

== History of immigration ==
=== American colonialization ===
During American colonial rule in the Philippines, there was an increase in American immigration to the Philippines. Retiring soldiers and other military men were among the first Americans to become long-term Philippine residents and settlers; these included Buffalo Soldiers and former Volunteers, primarily from the Western states.

The Education Act of 1901 authorized the colonial government to recruit American teachers to help establish an English-language educational system to replace the Spanish one. Some 80 former soldiers became teachers. They were soon joined by 48 teachers recruited in the United States who arrived in June 1901 on the US Army Transport ship Sheridan (named after General Philip Sheridan, a prominent military officer during and after the Civil War.) Some 523 others arrived on August 1, 1901, on the USAT Thomas. Collectively, these teachers became known as the Thomasites.

By 1913, there were more than 1,400 mestizos with American parentage, the children of the nearly 8,000 Americans living in the Philippines. 15% of the Amerasian children were orphans. Prior to World War I, Americans were not prevalent in the Philippines; most lived in restricted enclaves, particularly around Fort Santiago; one term for those who settled in the Philippines was Manila Americans. By 1939, 8,709 Americans were in the Philippines, primarily in Manila. Of these 4,022 were working age and employed. The Japanese invasion of the Philippines brought about an abrupt end to the distinctions of race, due to the external threat caused by the invasion.

=== Commonwealth period ===
The Commonwealth period (1935–1946) saw significant increases of American presence in the Philippines. By 1941, more than 20,000 U.S. military personnel were assigned to the Philippine Department of the United States Army Forces in the Far East when the Japanese invaded the Philippines. Many Americans were captured and imprisoned by Japanese forces. This U.S. military presence increased substantially during the U.S. Army actions to liberate the Philippines.

=== Post independence ===
When the Philippines gained independence from the United States in 1946, many Americans chose to settle there permanently. Until the mid-1990s, Americans were concentrated in the cities of Angeles and Olongapo, northwest of Metro Manila, because of the large US military bases there. During the American colonial period (1898–1946), a recorded number of more than 800,000 Americans were born in the Philippines. In 2008, it was estimated that 50,000 first-generation amerasians remained, and more than 200,000 if their descendants were included.

=== Lasting impacts ===
The American colonization of the Philippines imposed a universal formal education system, which helped increase the number of Filipinos working in business, educational, and governmental sectors. This system was mostly taught in English, and often had Americans as teachers.

Another lasting impact was on sanitation. Government officials enlisted the American military and health officers to monitor the overall sanitary conditions of the people, to the extent that soldiers took on the role of "Sanitary inspector", according to Warwick Anderson.

The colonization period of the Philippines formally ended in 1946, yet scholars continue to debate about the lasting effects of American settlement there. Critical internationalists of the early Cold War saw similarities between US-Philippines relations and European imperialism. Notions of neocolonialism have been attached in describing the United States' relations with the Philippines. Some historians of American foreign relations have argued that Philippine formal independence in 1946 was incomplete and unequal, and that there exists a 'dependent' alliance between the two countries. It has also been argued that historians who have drawn conclusions mainly from hindsight should pay closer attention to contemporary views.

== Amerasians ==
As the Philippines lies in Southeast Asia, the offspring of a Filipino national and an American service member or contractor is termed an Amerasian. These individuals were not covered under the American Homecoming Act.

In 1939, there were an estimated 50,000 mixed-race American mestizos. The 1939 census was undertaken in conformity with Section 1 of Commonwealth Act 170. The Philippine population figure was 16,000,303.

In 2012, the number of American mestizos is estimated to be 52,000. Most speak English, Tagalog and/or other Philippine languages. The majority are to be found in Angeles City, which has the largest proportion of Amerasians in the Philippines. Amerasians born in the Philippines have intermarried with other Amerasian and Filipino natives, creating a large number of Amerasian people with less than 50% Amerasian heritages.

A 2012 paper by an Angeles, Pampanga, Philippines Amerasian college research study unit suggests that the number of military origin, biracial Filipino Amerasians probably lies between 200,000 and 250,000, and possibly substantially more. The paper said that the number of Filipino Amerasians, the progeny of U.S. servicemen, private corporate contractor and government employees stationed over the years in the Philippines, is so significant that mixed-heritage Anglo, African and Latino Amerasians qualify as a genuine human diaspora. It focused on stigmatization, discrimination, psychosocial risks, and mental disorders among a sample of African and Anglo Amerasians residing in Angeles, site of the Clark Air Force Base. The paper asserts that the Angeles-Manila-Olongapo Triangle (AMO) contains the highest concentration of biracial Anglo, African and Latino Amerasians in the world.

As of 2013, the Philippines has a large population of Americans and people with American roots, including a significant Amerasian population; there are estimates of 52,000 to 250,000 Amerasians in the Philippines in 1992. These Americans have been joined by a number of Filipino Americans with U.S. citizenship who had immigrated to the United States, then returned to their country of birth. In addition, there is a population of Filipino Americans, who were born in the United States, who are immigrating to the Philippines, known as "baliktad", meaning backwards. In 2016, the total number of US citizens living in the Philippines was estimated officially as more than 220,000, with an unofficial source having estimated 600,000 in 2013. According to numbers cited by American Ambassador to the Philippines MaryKay Carlson, the number of American citizens living in the Philippines increased to 750,000 during year 2025.

The newer Amerasians from the United States would add to the already older settlement of peoples from other countries in the Americas that happened when the Philippines was under Spanish rule, as the Philippines once received immigrants from Spanish occupied Panama, Peru, and Mexico.

=== Education ===
American international schools in the Philippines include:

- International School Manila (formerly the "American School")
- St. Paul American School - Clark

== See also ==
- Afro-Asian
- Filipino American
- Foreign Account Tax Compliance Act
- Philippines–United States relations
- Thomasites
- Philippine nationality law
- Demographics of the Philippines
