= Lee Lipton =

American businessman and diplomat (born 1958)

- Official portrait, 2026

United States Ambassador to the Philippines
- Incumbent
- Assumed office June 30, 2026
- President: Donald Trump
- Preceded by: MaryKay Carlson

United States Ambassador to the Organization of American States
- Interim
- In office July 2025 – October 20, 2025
- President: Donald Trump
- Preceded by: Francisco O. Mora
- Succeeded by: Leandro Rizzuto Jr.

Personal details
- Born: Lee Marc Lipton; 1958 (age 67–68)
- Spouse: Erika Lipton (m. 1981)
- Children: 2
- Education: Bryant University
- Occupation: Businessman

Lee Marc Lipton (born 1958) is an American businessman and diplomat who has served as the United States ambassador to the Philippines since June 2026. Before entering public service, Lipton worked in the apparel industry in New York and later became a restaurant owner in South Florida. He was president of outerwear company Andy Johns and subsequently led an apparel business involved in licensed clothing for brands including Calvin Klein, St. John Knits, and Guess. He later became the owner of Benny's on the Beach in Lake Worth Beach, Florida.

Lipton entered public service during the second presidency of Donald Trump. In 2025, he served as chief of staff of the U.S. mission to the Organization of American States (OAS) and subsequently as interim U.S. ambassador to the organization. Trump also appointed him to the United States Holocaust Memorial Council that year.

== Early life and education ==
Lee Marc Lipton was born in 1958. He earned a bachelor's degree from Bryant University.

== Business career ==
=== Apparel industry ===
Lipton began his business career in the New York apparel industry. He was a junior partner in Andy Johns, an outerwear company, when the business was sold in 1986.

By May 1995, Lipton was president of Andy Johns, which was then associated with Biscayne Apparel. That year, the company introduced a young outerwear collection under the "Lee Lipton" name for Nordstrom. Lipton and Andrew Reid later resigned from their positions at Biscayne Apparel.

Lipton subsequently founded and led an apparel company in New York City. The company designed, manufactured, marketed, and distributed licensed clothing associated with Calvin Klein, St. John Knits, and Guess. He later sold the company to a publicly traded corporation.

=== Restaurants ===
By the 2010s, Lipton had left the apparel industry and entered the restaurant business in South Florida. In 2013, he acquired Benny's on the Beach, a seafood restaurant on the Lake Worth Beach pier, and entered a business partnership with chef Jeremy Hanlon. Lipton sought to expand the restaurant from a primarily breakfast-focused operation into an all-day restaurant. His sons Max and Dylan later became involved in the business. Benny's expanded under Lipton's ownership. By 2023, it employed about 200 people, compared with approximately 20 when he acquired the business.

In 2020, Lipton, his son Max, and Hanlon opened Viva La Playa, a Latin American restaurant in Lake Worth Beach. Following Hurricane Ian in 2022, Lipton and his business partners converted Viva La Playa into a second Benny's on the Beach branch, which opened in December 2022. The expansion was partly intended to provide an alternative location if hurricane damage disrupted operations at the original pier restaurant, while also accommodating demand at the original location.

== Public service ==
=== Organization of American States ===
In January 2025, Lipton became chief of staff of the U.S. mission to the Organization of American States (OAS). In the role, he oversaw staff operations, financial resources, and interagency coordination in support of U.S. foreign policy priorities in the Western Hemisphere. His work also included U.S. engagement concerning the Haitian crisis and efforts to counter what the U.S. government characterized as malign influence by the Chinese Communist Party within the inter-American system.

In July 2025, Lipton became interim Ambassador of the United States to the OAS, serving until October 20, 2025. In that capacity, he served as the senior U.S. representative to the organization.

=== United States Holocaust Memorial Council ===
In May 2025, President Donald Trump appointed Lipton to the United States Holocaust Memorial Council.

=== Ambassador to the Philippines ===
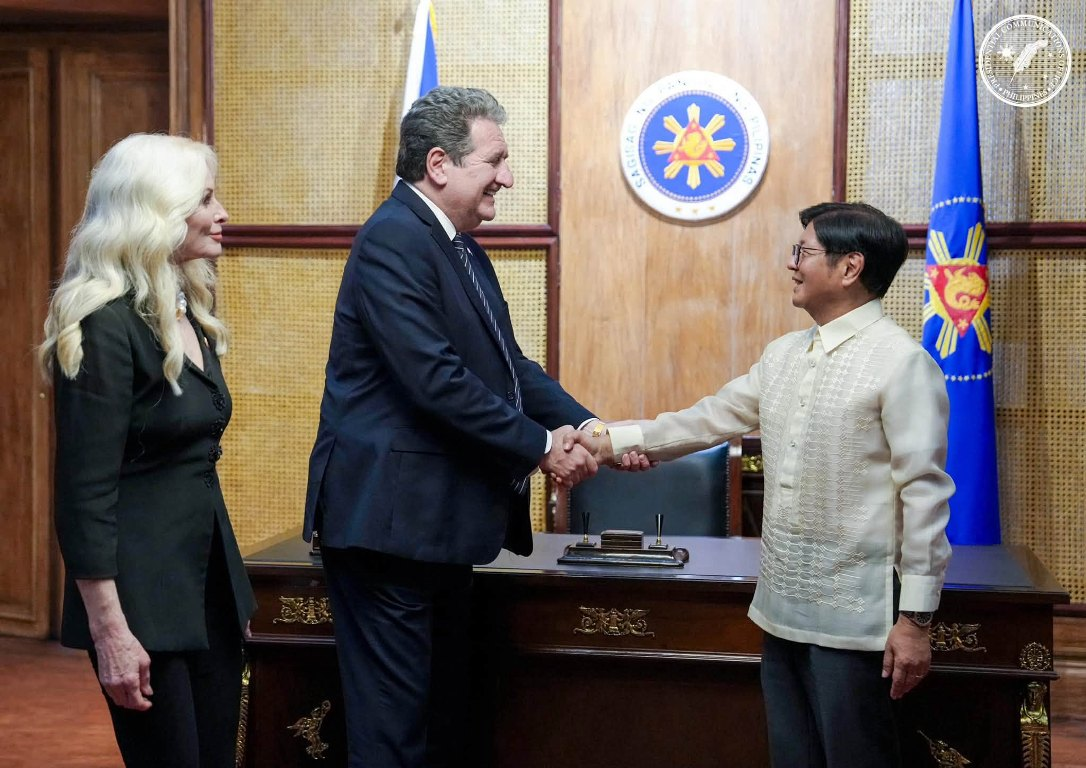
Lipton (center) and his wife Erika (left) meeting Philippine president Bongbong Marcos on June 30, 2026

President Trump nominated Lipton as United States ambassador to the Philippines on October 8, 2025, to succeed MaryKay Carlson.

At his confirmation hearing before the Senate Foreign Relations Committee on March 5, 2026, Lipton identified competition with China as a major issue in Philippines–United States relations. He said the United States should respond to what he described as China's unlawful expansion and aggressive conduct and compete with China "from a position of strength". Lipton also supported strengthening Philippine military capabilities and said implementation of the Philippines Enhanced Resilience Act, which provides U.S. financing for Philippine defense modernization, would be a priority.

The Senate confirmed Lipton on May 18, 2026, by a vote of 46–43. His confirmation made him the first political appointee, rather than a career Foreign Service officer, to serve as U.S. ambassador to the Philippines since G. Mennen Williams in 1969.

Lipton arrived in Manila on June 28, 2026, to begin his post. On June 30, he presented his credentials to Philippine president Bongbong Marcos, formally assuming his duties as ambassador.

Lipton has supported U.S. investment in the Luzon Economic Corridor (LEC), which he viewed as a means of countering Chinese economic influence in the Philippines. He advocated expanding civil nuclear-energy cooperation between the Philippines and the U.S., stating that nuclear power could help reduce electricity costs in the Philippines and supporting partnerships with American energy companies. Lipton has also promoted the Pax Silica initiative as a major component of Philippine–U.S. economic cooperation. In July 2026, he said that the Philippines and the U.S. were moving "quickly" to advance both Pax Silica and the LEC, describing them as major priorities for the two countries. He also visited the proposed Pax Silica Economic Security Zone in New Clark City, Tarlac, and described the project as a major focus of his tenure.

== Personal life ==
Lipton has been married to Erika Lipton since 1981. They have two sons, Max and Dylan, both of whom have worked in the family's restaurant businesses.

The media has described Lipton as a personal friend, supporter, and longtime golfing companion of President Donald Trump. He is a member of the Mar-a-Lago Club in Palm Beach, Florida. Before the 2024 presidential election, Lipton contributed approximately $10,000 to political committees supporting Trump.

== See also ==
- List of ambassadors appointed in the second Trump presidency

Diplomatic posts
Preceded by MaryKay Carlson	United States Ambassador to the Philippines; 2026–present	Incumbent
