= John Hay Air Station =

Former military installation in Baguio, Philippines

- Baguio in Philippines

Site information
- Controlled by: United States

Location
- Location within Luzon Location within Philippines
- Coordinates: 16°23′33″N 120°37′09″E

Site history
- Built: 1903
- In use: 1903 – 1991
- Fate: Turned over to the Philippine government for civilian use
- Battles/wars: World War II

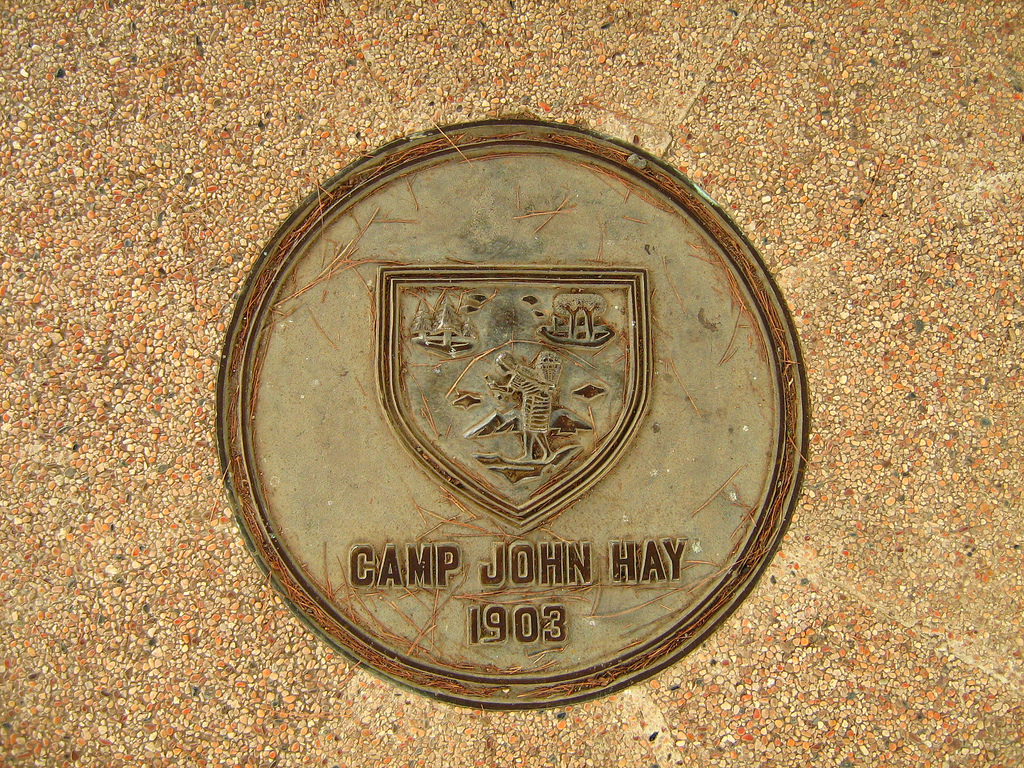
Seal of camp John Hay

John Hay Air Station, more commonly known as Camp John Hay, was a military installation in Baguio, Philippines.

The site was a major hill station used for rest and recreation, or R&R, for personnel and dependents of the United States Armed Forces in the Philippines as well as United States Department of Defense employees and their dependents. It was last run by the United States Air Force as a communications station.

With an average elevation of 5,000 feet (1,500 m), Camp John Hay – and Baguio in general – is much cooler and less humid than the rest of the Philippine Islands (later known as the Republic of the Philippines from 1946), thereby providing a more familiar mild climate the typical American soldier knows back home. The facility housed The American Residence as well as broadcasting facilities of the Voice of America.

In World War II, Camp Hay was bombed by the Japanese on December 8, 1941, captured by the Japanese army on December 27, 1941, and used for several months to house 500 civilian internees, mostly Americans, who were living in the area. It was recaptured by the United States Army in 1945.

The site was turned over to the Philippine government in 1991, and was converted into a leisure and tourist site.

== History ==
John Hay Air Station was established on October 25, 1903, after President Theodore Roosevelt signed an executive order setting aside land in Benguet for a military reservation under the United States Army. The reservation was named after Roosevelt's Secretary of State, John Milton Hay. For a time, elements of the 1st Battalion of the Philippine Division's 43d Infantry Regiment (PS) were stationed here. Prior to World War II, a number of buildings had been constructed on base, including a U.S. Army Hospital and the summer residence of the Governor-General of the Philippines, later to be known as The American Residence, which is now used as the summer house of the United States Ambassador to the Philippines.

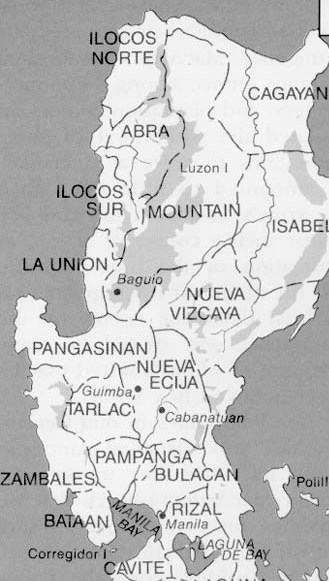
A map of Luzon island, Philippines. John Hay Air Base was adjacent to the town of Baguio.

== World War II ==
Camp John Hay was the first place in the Philippines bombed by Japan in World War II. At 8:19 a.m. on December 8, 1941 – December 7 on the Hawaii side of the International Date Line – seventeen Japanese bombers attacked Camp John Hay killing eleven soldiers, American and Filipino, and several civilians in the town of Baguio.

The first response of John Hay’s commander, Col. John P. Horan, was to order all the several hundred Japanese residents of Baguio rounded up and interned in two damaged barracks on the base. The Japanese pleaded with Horan not to confine them in a place likely to bombed again. The one thousand American and Filipino soldiers at Camp Hay made little effort to defend Baguio from the advancing Japanese invaders. They abandoned the area on December 24, destroying most of their weapons and equipment and leaving the Japanese internees locked up without food and water. The soldiers left former Mayor, E.J. Halsema, in charge and he and Elmer Herold, another American resident of Baguio, provided food and water to the Japanese internees.

The Japanese army marched into Baguio unopposed the night of December 27. About 500 civilians, the great majority Americans, were interned by the Japanese at Camp John Hay in the same barracks where the Japanese had been interned. About 40 percent were missionaries from 22 different denominations, some who had recently fled China and organized a language school in Baguio. The other 60 percent were primarily miners and businessmen. Two U.S. Army nurses were among the internees. The Japanese appointed Elmer Herold as leader of the internees. Many of the Americans later attributed their relatively benign treatment, compared to internees in other camps, to the concern shown by Halsema and Herold for the welfare of the former Japanese internees, some of whom now became employed in the camp.

However, living conditions were difficult. All 500 internees were crowded into a single building, which had previously housed 60 soldiers, and the Japanese made little provision for food and water. Bedding was on the floor and each bed was rolled into a bundle during the day to allow for more space. After a few weeks, because of the obvious need, an additional building was obtained for male internees. The first project for the prisoners was to clean the building. Water had to be carried for one mile as the water main had been broken during the bombing. Drinking water was boiled as chemicals were not available. Lack of water, outside latrines, lack of screens for doors and windows, crowded buildings and the general lethargy of the prisoners contributed to poor sanitation. Intestinal diseases soon developed. Dysentery became so prevalent among the children, and adults as well, that a small dispensary was set up in the barracks.

On April 23, 1942, the five hundred American and Western internees were moved to Camp Holmes, a base of the Philippine constabulary, five miles from Camp Hay. They were joined there by 300 Chinese internees. Conditions at Camp Holmes were much better.

Many of the original buildings which were used to house internees still stand such as the building now occupied by the Lonestar Steakhouse, the Base Chapel and the adjoining rows of cottages.

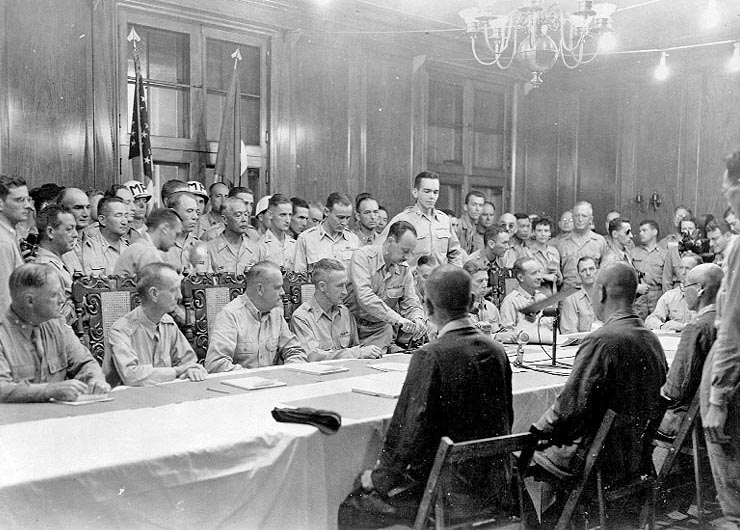
Surrender of Japanese Forces in the Philippines, September 3, 1945. General Tomoyuki Yamashita, is seated in the middle on the near side of the table. Seated on the opposite side, second from left, is Lieutenant General Jonathan M. Wainwright

During the Japanese occupation, General Tomoyuki Yamashita used The American Residence as his headquarters and official residence.

On April 26, 1945, Baguio and Camp John Hay fell into American hands. Combined Filipino and American forces pursued the retreating Japanese into the forests of the Benguet Mountains. Finally, on September 3, 1945, Yamashita surrendered to General Jonathan Wainwright at The American Residence. British General Arthur Percival stood as witness. These two Generals, who were both defeated by Yamashita, especially flew up to Baguio to accept the surrender of Yamashita.

== Facilities ==
At present, the former American R&R facility serves as a tourist attraction. Among its facilities are the 19th Tee, Halfway House, Scout Hill baseball field, Main Club (also known as Officer's Building), the Par-69 golf course, several restaurants and shops, The Manor Hotel, The Forest Lodge at Camp John Hay. and the well-known Mile-Hi Recreation Center. It was off-limits to the general public, except for some who had access due to connections or official business. .

=== The American Residence ===
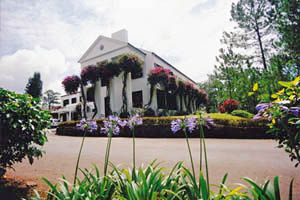
The American Residence

Baguio's 78-acre L-shaped 2-storey American Residence was constructed in 1940 and was envisioned to be the summer residence of the High Commissioner to the Philippines. Previously, the highest American official in the Philippines, the Governor-General, had summered at The Mansion but with the establishment of the Philippine Commonwealth The Mansion was turned over to the President of the Philippines for his use.

Built by Paul V. McNutt, then high commissioner and later Ambassador to the Philippines, his "summer palace" was criticized at the time for being too expensive, notably by Representative Albert J. Engel of Michigan. With the granting of Philippine independence on July 4, 1946, it became the summer residence of the United States Ambassador to the Philippines.

It is the site of surrender of Japan signing ceremony at the famous "Tomoyuki Yamashita Room." The Japanese military and political leaders occupied it from December 28, 1941 until the liberation of Baguio on April 27, 1945. At 1210 hours, September 3, 1945, Tomoyuki Yamashita and Vice Admiral Denhici Okochi emerged from Kiangan to sign the Instrument of surrender with Major General Edmond H. Leavey.

When the Americans turned over John Hay to the Philippines, the Philippine Government reportedly requested the U.S. Government to include The American Residence in the transfer; this request was denied by the Americans.

During Ambassador Francis J. Ricciardone's term, the U.S. State Department wanted to give up the residence because it was costing too much to maintain. The Ambassador was able to convince the State Department to keep it because of its historical value.

On September 3, 2005, during the term of Ambassador Ricciardone, the Philippines' National Historical Institute installed a Level II marker on the residence, which reads:

This building was completed in 1940 to serve as the summer residence of the US High Commissioner of [sic] the Philippines. During World War II, Japanese military and political leaders occupied the residence from December 28, 1941, until April 27, 1945, when Allied Forces and Filipino guerrillas liberated the city of Baguio, forcing the Japanese to withdraw into the surrounding mountains. On September 2, 1945, as the Japanese surrendered to Allied Forces in Tokyo, Commander of the Japanese Army in the Philippines, General Tomoyuki Yamashita emerged from hiding in Kiangan to surrender and was brought to Baguio. In this building on September 3, 1945, at 1210 hours, General Yamashita and Vice Admiral Denhici Okochi, Commander of the Japanese Navy in the Philippines, formally surrendered to United States' Forces represented by Major General Edmond H. Leavey, Deputy Commander of the United States Army Forces, Western Pacific. They signed the Instrument for Surrender, which completed the surrender of all Japanese Forces in the Philippines and officially ended the war here. Since 1946, the US Embassy has used the residence for meetings, receptions and staff retreats.

The residence is also listed in the Register of Culturally Significant Property. MaryKay Carlson announced her intention to open its door to visitors. Today, its façade showcases the 1930s modern style with traditional southern plantation, white columns, US embassy seal and tall flagpole. The interior has 7 bedrooms upstairs with the ambassador and deputy chief of mission suites, dining room, library, living room with large fireplaces, art Deco kitchen and black-and-white checkered tile flooring. It also has a pergola open terrace and veranda.

== See also ==
- Battle of Baguio (1945)
- Military History of the Philippines
- Military History of the United States
