= MaryKay Carlson =

American diplomat

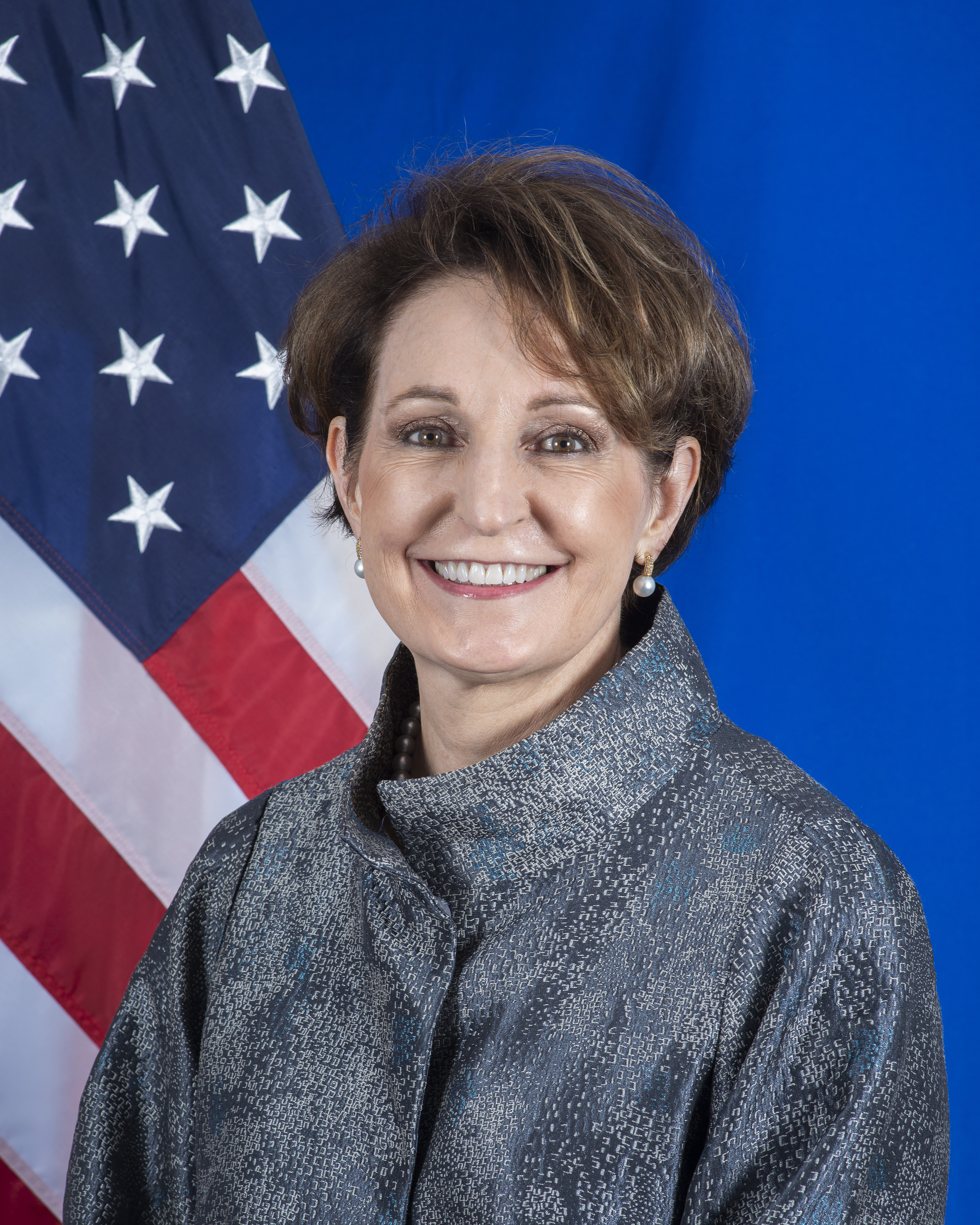

United States Ambassador to the Philippines
- In office July 22, 2022 – January 16, 2026
- President: Joe Biden; Donald Trump
- Preceded by: Sung Kim
- Succeeded by: Lee Lipton

United States Chargé d’affaires to Argentina
- In office January 20, 2021 – January 24, 2022
- President: Joe Biden
- Preceded by: Edward C. Prado
- Succeeded by: Marc Stanley

United States Chargé d'affaires to India
- In office January 20, 2017 – November 15, 2017
- President: Donald Trump
- Preceded by: Richard Verma
- Succeeded by: Kenneth Juster

Personal details
- Born: Little Rock, Arkansas, U.S.
- Spouse: Aubrey Carlson
- Children: 2
- Education: Rhodes College (BA); Georgetown University (MA); National War College (M.S.)
- Occupation: Diplomat
- MaryKay Carlson's voice Carlson's opening statement at her confirmation hearing before the Senate Foreign Relations Committee to be United States ambassador to the Philippines; Recorded April 7, 2022

MaryKay Loss Carlson is an American diplomat who served as the United States ambassador to the Philippines from 2022 to 2026. She was previously the United States chargé d'affaires in Argentina from 2021 to 2022, after having served as the Deputy Chief of Mission in the country from September 2019.

== Early life and education ==
Carlson graduated from Rhodes College in 1985 with a degree in Spanish and international studies before pursuing an M.A. in international relations from Georgetown University and M.S. in national security strategy from the National War College.

== Career ==
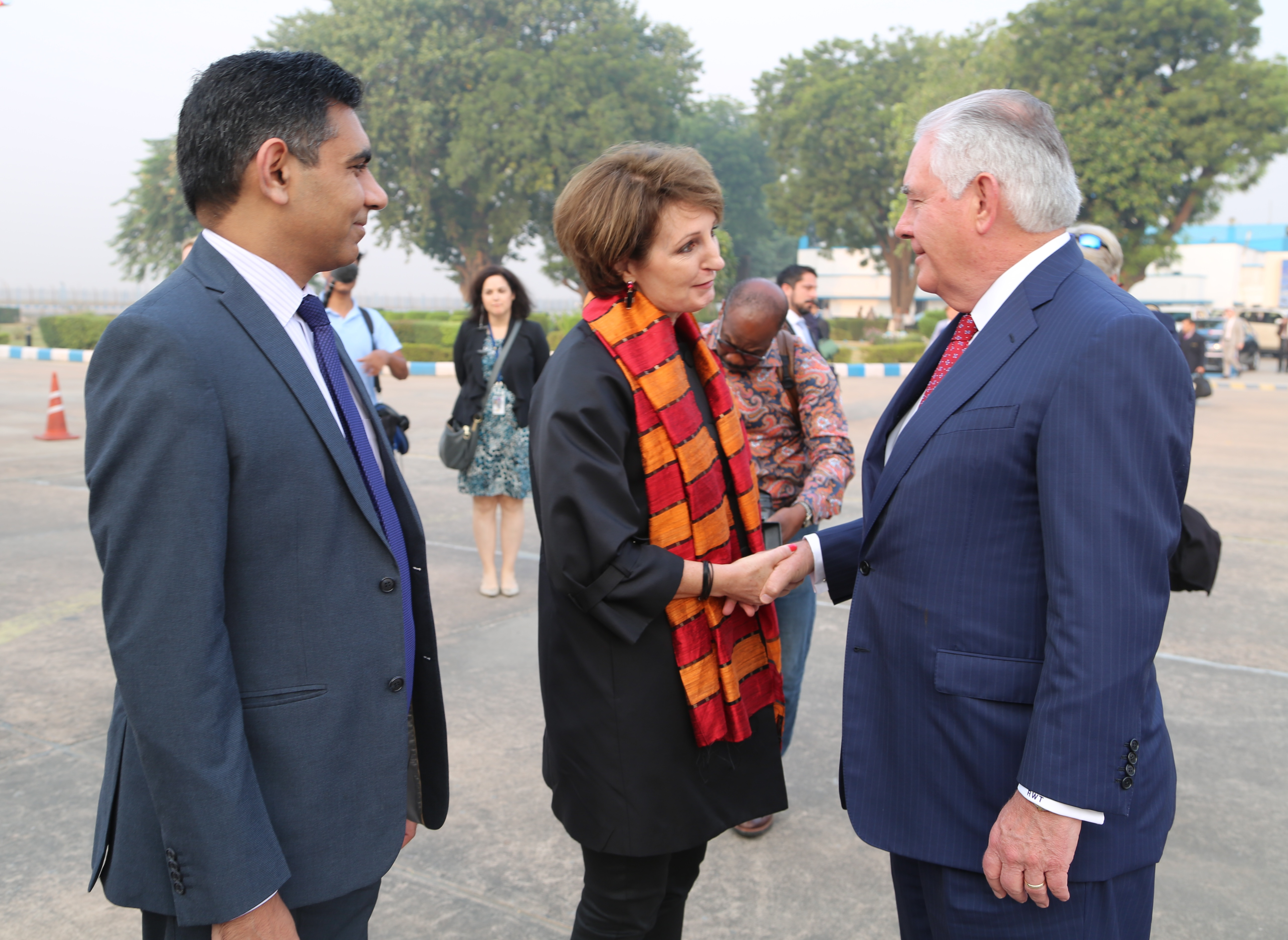
Carlson with then-Secretary Rex Tillerson in New Delhi.

Carlson is a career member of the Foreign Service, serving since 1985. She holds the rank of Minister-Counselor. Carlson worked at the Embassy of the United States in New Delhi, India as the Deputy Chief of Mission for three years and Chargé d'affaires for two years. She has also served at U.S. Embassy in Beijing, China (twice), Embassy in Kyiv, Ukraine, Consulate General in Hong Kong, Embassy in Maputo, Mozambique, Embassy in Nairobi, Kenya, and the Embassy in Santo Domingo, Dominican Republic. She had also served as Deputy Chief of Mission at the U.S. embassy in Buenos Aires, Argentina. Her domestic assignments include director of the Secretary's Executive Secretariat Staff and deputy director of Korean Affairs.

=== United States ambassador to the Philippines ===
On February 4, 2022, President Joe Biden nominated Carlson to serve as US Ambassador to the Philippines. Hearings on her nomination were held before the Senate Foreign Relations Committee on April 7, 2022. The committee favorably reported the nomination to the Senate floor on May 4, 2022. Carlson was confirmed by the entire Senate via voice vote on May 5, 2022. Carlson was sworn in on May 26, 2022. She presented her credentials to Philippine president Bongbong Marcos on July 22, 2022.

== Awards and recognitions ==
Carlson has received numerous performance awards, including six Superior Honor Awards.

== Personal life ==
Carlson is married to retired Foreign Service officer Aubrey Carlson, and they have two daughters, Kathryn and Karen. She is a native of Little Rock, Arkansas and speaks Spanish and Chinese.

Diplomatic posts
Preceded by Edward C. Prado	United States Chargé d’affaires in Argentina; 2021–2022	Succeeded by Marc Stanley
Preceded by Sung Kim	United States Ambassador to the Philippines; 2022–2026	Succeeded by Lee Lipton
