= US–Japan–Philippines trilateral summit =

Transpacific alliance

Map indicating the United States (blue), Japan (orange), and the Philippines (green)
Member states and key leaders:
- United States: President Joe Biden
- Japan: Prime Minister Fumio Kishida
- Philippines: President Bongbong Marcos
- Participants: United States, Japan, Philippines
- Founded: 2024

The US–Japan–Philippines trilateral summit is a summit meeting attended by the United States, Japan and the Philippines. The latter two are Asian countries that are treaty allies to the United States.

== History ==
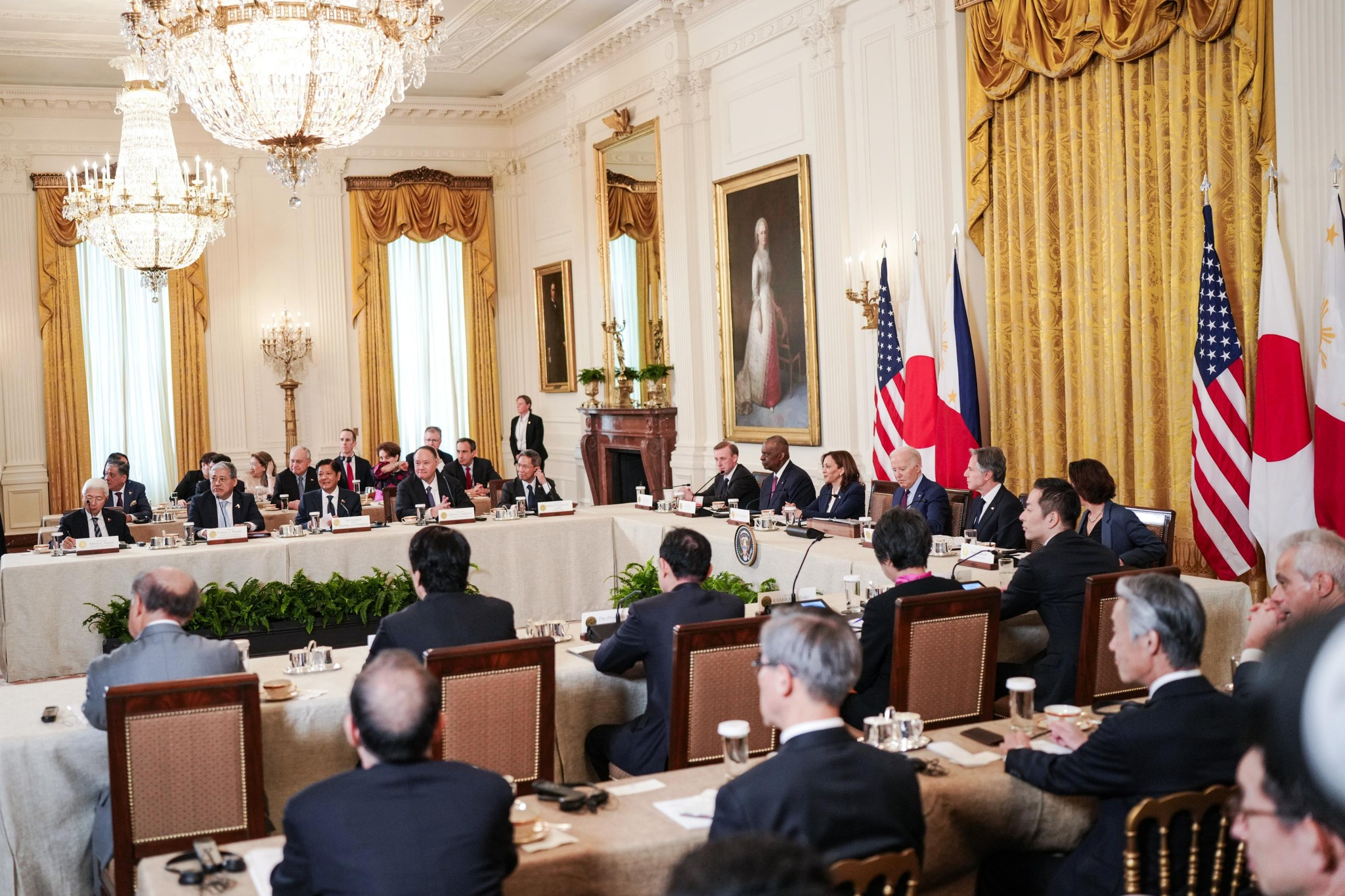
April 2024 meeting

The first ever trilateral summit involving the United States, Japan and the Philippines would be held at the White House in Washington D.C. on April 11, 2024.

This followed joint meeting between national security advisers of the three countries in and join exercise of the nation's coast guards off the waters of Bataan in June 2023.

The summit was held in response to China's enforcement of its own sovereignty claims in relation to the South China Sea dispute which the three nations deemed to be made through "dangerous and aggressive behavior". China would condemn the meeting insisting that its actions in the South China Sea and East China Sea as "lawful". Japan has EEZ disputes with China in the latter.

US President Joe Biden has affirmed the United States' treaty alliances with Japan and the Philippines.

It was also announced that the three nations would make the Philippines as a new hub for the Partnership for Global Infrastructure and Investment scheme of the Group of Seven, by opening the Luzon Economic Corridor in Luzon island.

Japan and the United States would commit $8 million for the funding of Open Radio Access Network (RAN) field trials in the Philippines.

== Summits ==
Trilateral Leaders' Summit
Summit	Host Country	Participants			Host city	Date
Summit	Host Country	United States President	Japan Prime Minister	Philippines President	Host city	Date
1st	United States	Joe Biden	Fumio Kishida	Bongbong Marcos	Washington D.C.	April 11, 2024
2nd	Philippines	Michael George DeSombre, Assistant Secretary for East Asian and Pacific Affairs	Hokugo Kyoko, Deputy Director-General, Ministry of Foreign Affairs	Leo M. Herrera-Lim, Foreign Affairs Undersecretary	Manila, Philippines	June 8, 2026

== See also ==
- U.S.–Japan Alliance
- Mutual Defense Treaty (United States–Philippines)
- Enhanced Defense Cooperation Agreement
- China–Japan–South Korea trilateral summit
