= United States bases in the Philippines =

American military bases following World War II

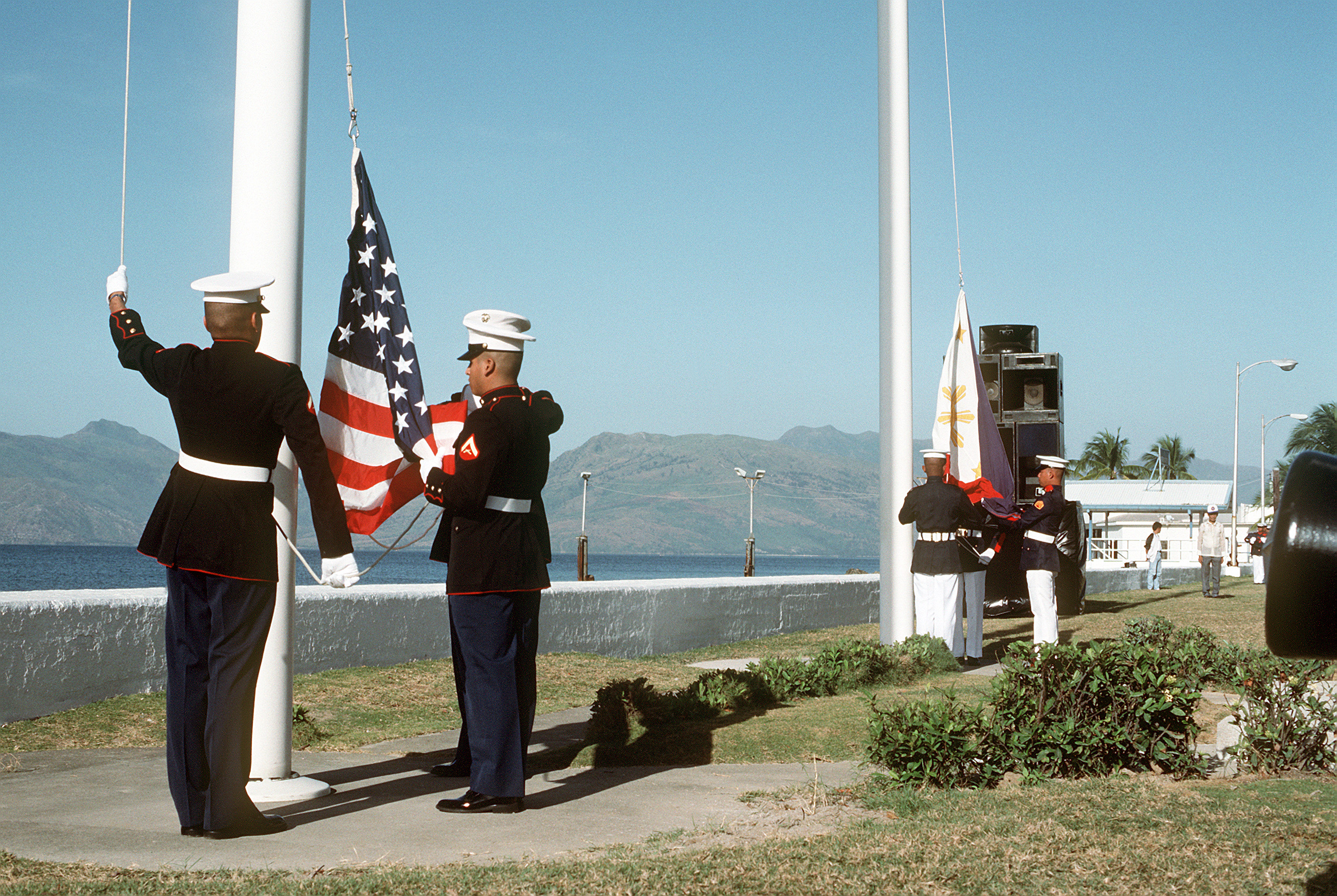
- The American flag is lowered and Philippine flag is raised during turnover of Naval Station Subic Bay.

United States military bases were established in the Philippines on the basis of a treaty signed after the conclusion of World War II and the recognition of Philippine independence by the US. The bases established under that treaty were discontinued in 1991 and 1992, after the Senate of the Philippines narrowly rejected a new treaty which would have allowed some of the bases to continue for another ten years.

In 2014, the Enhanced Defense Cooperation Agreement (EDCA) designated five Philippine military bases as locations for American troops. In 2023, four additional locations were designated.

== Establishment ==
- On June 29, 1944, with WW-II still underway in both the European and Pacific theatres, a Joint Resolution of the US Congress authorized the President of the United States to acquire bases for the mutual protection of the Philippines.
- On July 28, 1945, the Congress of the Philippines unanimously approved Joint Resolution No. 4, which authorized the President of the Philippines to enter into negotiations for the establishment of such bases. At that time, the Philippine islands were still occupied by Japan and the government of the Commonwealth of the Philippines was seated in the US, in exile.

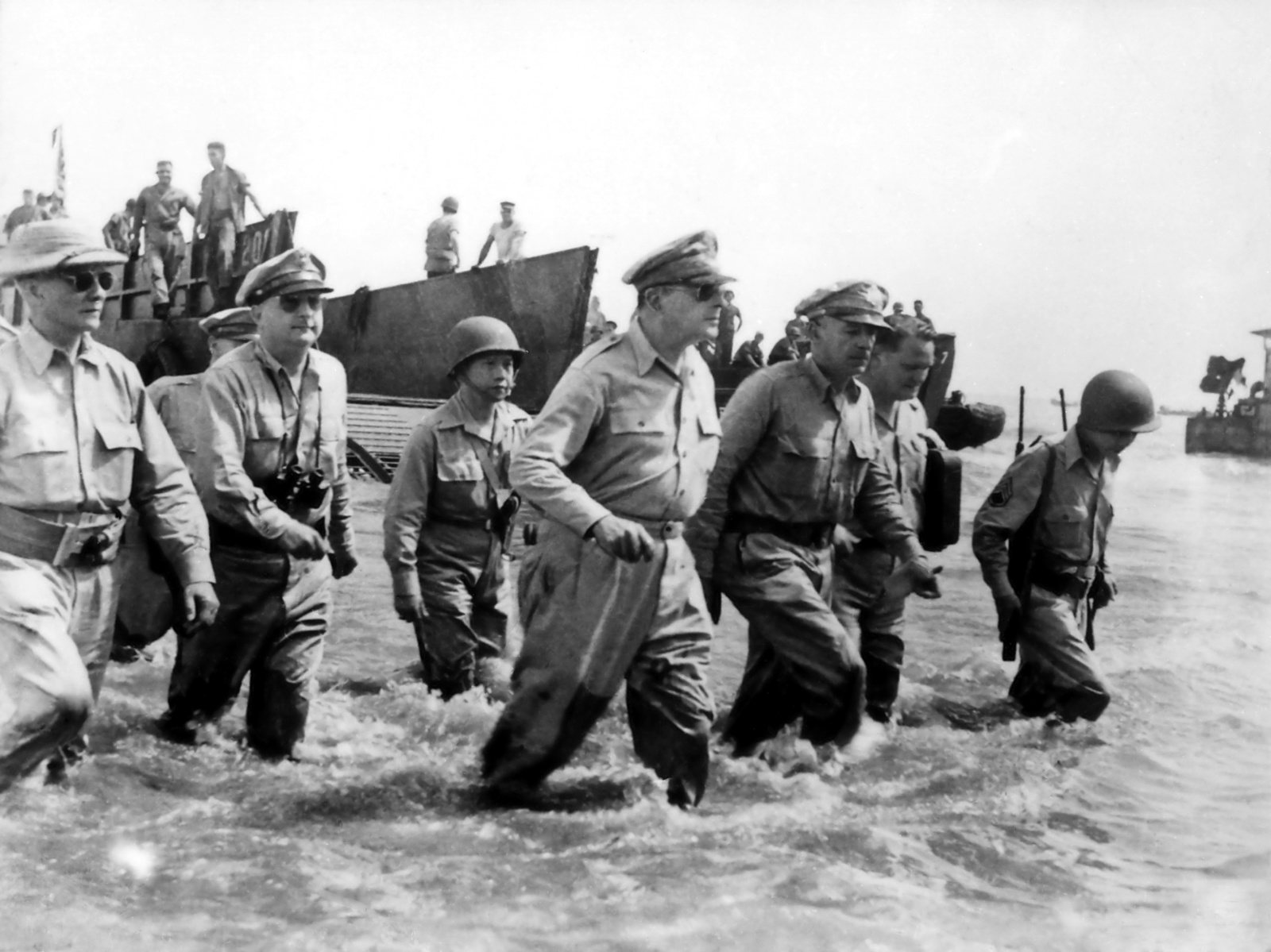
General Douglas MacArthur, President Osmeña, and staff land at Palo, Leyte on October 20, 1944.

- On October 20, 1944, the Commonwealth government returned to the Philippines as President Sergio Osmeña returned to the Philippines with the US Sixth Army as the US Philippines campaign to liberate the Philippines began.
- On March 26, 1947, following on the US recognition of Philippine independence, a military bases agreement between the Philippines and the US entered into force. That agreement was to remain in force for 99 years and granted the right to retain the use of the following bases, with some restrictions:

- Clark Field Air Base, Pampanga;
- Fort Stotsenberg, Pampanga;
- Mariveles Military Reservation, POL Terminal and Training Area, Bataan
- Camp John Hay Leave and Recreation Center, Baguio;
- An Army Communication System with the deletion of all stations in the Port of Manila Area.
- United States Armed Forces Cemetery No. 2, San Francisco del Monte, Rizal. (Note: Manila #2 Cemetery was disinterred and moved to the American Graves Registration Service (AGRS) mausoleum at Nichols Field beginning in the fall of 1947 and continuing through July 1948.)
- Leyte-Samar Naval Base including shore installations and air bases;
- Subic Bay, Northwest Shore Naval Base, Zambales Province, and the existing Naval reservation at Olongapo and the existing Baguio Naval Reservation;
- Tawi Tawi Naval Anchorage and small adjacent land areas;
- Cañacao-Sangley Point Navy Base, Cavite Province.
- Bagobantay Transmitter Area, Quezon City, and associated radio receiving and control sites, Manila Area;
- Tarumpitao Point (Loran Master Transmitter Station), Palawan;
- Talampulan Island, Coast Guard No. 354 (Loran), Palawan;
- Naule Point (Loran Station), Zambales;
- Castillejos, Coast Guard No, 356, Zambales.

That agreement also specified that the Philippine government would permit the US, upon notice, to use such of the following bases as the US determined that to be required by military necessity:

- Mactan Island Army and Navy Air Base;
- Florida Blanca Air Base, Pampanga;
- Aircraft Service Warning Net;
- Camp Wallace, San Fernando, La Union;
- Puerto Princesa Army and Navy Air Base, including Navy Section Base and Ai;
- Warning Sites, Palawan;
- Tawi Tawi Naval Base, Sulu Archipelago;
- Aparri Naval Air Base.

== During the postwar era ==
- In 1958, the US relinquished the Manila Military Port area, the only remaining American military installation in Manila
- In 1966, the Rusk-Ramos Agreement shortened base leaseholds from 99 to 25 years, terminated US control over Olongapo, and limited US military holdings to a few minor installations and four major bases: Clark Air Base in Pampanga, two main naval bases at Sangley Point in Cavite and Subic Bay Naval Base in Zambales, and recreational Camp John Hay in Baguio. With this agreement, the leasehold termination date changed from 2046 to 1991, with renewal options.

== During the Marcos dictatorship ==
- By the time Ferdinand Marcos was inaugurated as the Tenth President of the Philippines on December 30, 1965, the bases agreement between the Philippines and the US was nearly two decades old, and the continued presence of the bases helped shape the tone of the relationship between the two countries. All five of the American presidents from 1965 to 1985 were unwilling to jeopardize the US–Marcos relationship, mainly because they felt a need to protect and retain the bases in order to project power in Asia and the Asia-Pacific. Marcos managed to hold on to power for 21 years despite Martial Law and the many human rights violations perpetuated by his administration, and the negative international press that came with it all, by manipulating the U.S. military's dependence on the bases.
- The US Bases became a political issue in the Philippines during the late 1960s, which saw a resurgence of Filipino nationalism, especially among students. The presence of the bases became rallying points in the First Quarter Storm protests of January to March 1970, alongside the deployment of Filipino troops to the Vietnam War and the economic strain caused by the 1969 Philippine balance of payments crisis and Marcos' debt-driven spending in the leadup to the 1969 presidential campaign
- In 1979, the Military Bases Agreement was substantially altered in many areas in direct response to growing Filipino popular criticism. A Philippine commander was designated at each base but the US retained operational command over US facilities located there, substantially reducing areas directly under US control. The issue of compensation was also addressed for the first time with the US agreeing to pay $500 million for a five-year period. This increased to $900 million in 1983 for the next five years.

== During and after the People Power Revolution ==
- The US Bases in the Philippines ended up playing various roles as the civilian-led People Power revolution played out in February 1986. Camp John Hay played a minor role in the local People Power protests in Baguio City because the protesters there were receiving news from the Armed Forces Radio and Television Network station attached to the camp. This enabled the protesters to adapt their protest tactics just as events in distant Camps Aguinaldo and Crame played out. Clark Air Base played a more direct role when the Ferdinand Marcos and a party of about 80 family members and close associates were brought there after fleeing Malacañang Palace, and were eventually brought into an exile location in Honolulu, Hawaii made available to them by the US.
- US support for the new government of Corazon Aquino translated into military action when the George H. W. Bush administration sent F-4 fighter jets from Clark to "buzz" the planes being used by the Reform the Armed Forces Movement forces during the 1989 Philippine coup attempt - an action that effectively caused the coup to collapse.
- The US Bases in the Philippines, particularly Clark and Subic, became major staging areas during the Gulf War.

== Final years of the bases treaty ==
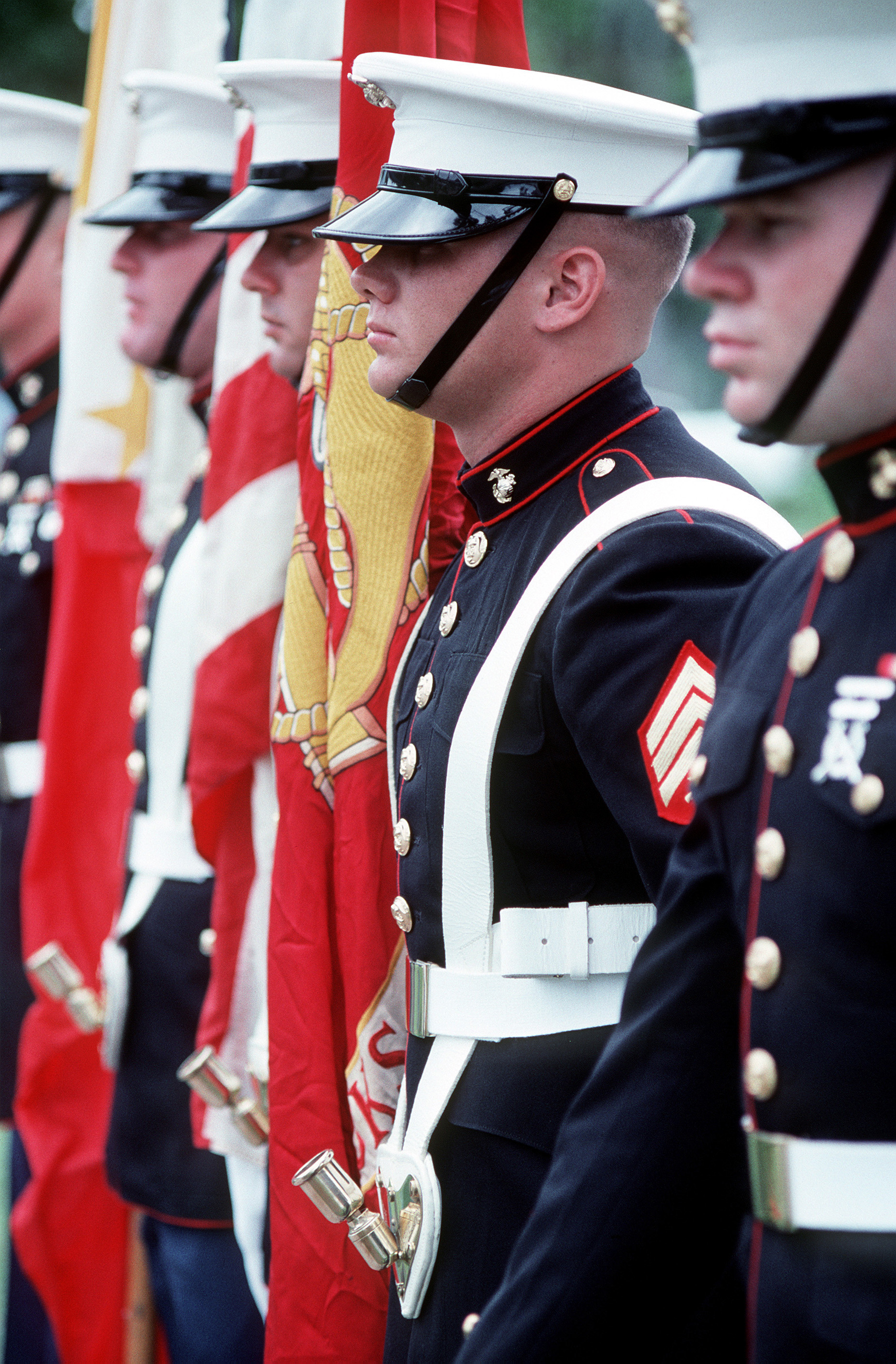
A Marine color guard stands at attention during the deactivation ceremony for Naval station, Subic Bay.

=== Renegotiation and proposed new treaty ===
From 1988 to 1992, the US government and Philippine government worked to renegotiate the terms of an extension of the military bases at Subic and Clark, because the 1947 bases agreement was due to expire. One bone of contention on the part of the negotiators was the amount of money that the US government would pay to the Philippine government for the lease and use of the bases, but the bases had also become a political liability for the Aquino government, with the Los Angeles Times noting that "many Filipinos denounce the bases as an affront to Philippine sovereignty, remnants of American paternalism and colonialism."

After the eruption of Mount Pinatubo in June 1991, the US decided to abandon nearby Clark Air Base, which had been heavily damaged by ash emissions and lahar flows. An emergency evacuation of all non-essential military and U.S. Department of Defense civilian personnel and their dependents from Clark Air Base and U.S. Naval Base Subic Bay ensued.

In July 1991, the negotiators agreed on a draft agreement titled the Treaty of Friendship, Peace and Cooperation, proposing the clean-up and turn over of Clark to the Philippine government in 1992, and extending the lease of Subic Bay Naval Base by the US for ten years.

=== Extension rejection by the Philippine Senate ===
On September 16, 1991, the Philippine Senate rejected renewal of the bases agreement by a slim margin. The vote resulted in 11 senators in favor of extending the treaty, and 12 senators in favor of suppressing it. The Anti-Bases Coalition, founded by senators Jose W. Diokno and Lorenzo Tañada led the call to end American military presence in the country. At the time of the vote, the retired senator Tañada stood up on his wheelchair to rapturous applause shouting, "Mabuhay!" or "Long live the Philippines."

Voted to extend	Voted against extending
1. Heherson Alvarez; 2. Edgardo Angara; 3. Neptali Gonzales; 4. Ernesto Herrera; 5. Joey Lina; 6. John Henry Osmeña; 7. Vicente Paterno; 8. Santanina Rasul; 9. Alberto Romulo; 10. Leticia Ramos Shahani; 11. Mamintal Tamano	1. Agapito Aquino; 2. Juan Ponce Enrile; 3. Joseph Estrada; 4. Teofisto Guingona Jr.; 5. Sotero Laurel; 6. Ernesto Maceda; 7. Orlando S. Mercado; 8. Aquilino Pimentel Jr.; 9. Rene Saguisag; 10. Jovito Salonga; 11. Wigberto Tañada; 12. Victor Ziga

Despite further efforts by the Aquino administration to salvage the treaty, the two sides could not reach a new agreement. As a result, the Philippine Government informed the US on December 6, 1991, that it would have one year to complete withdrawal.

=== Closure and turnover ===
On November 26, 1991, the US government formally turned Clark over to the Philippine government, which transformed the airfield into Clark International Airport. Subic Bay Naval Base was deactivated in 1992. These were the two largest US military bases in the Philippines at the time, and other US bases were deactivated in this same time period, ending the US military presence in the Philippines.

== Impact on Ibaloi and Aeta indigenous communities ==
The establishment of the US bases, particularly of Fort Stotsenberg, Clark Airfield, Subic Bay, and John Hay, frequently resulted in the displacement and disenfranchisement of the Aeta and Ibaloi indigenous peoples who lived in the land, at a time when they were already facing pressures from the incursions of civilian lowlanders. None of these indigenous peoples were properly compensated at the time the bases were established, and they remain marginalized and unable to return to their historic lands today.

== Leftover toxic wastes in Subic and Clark ==
A dispute arose over toxic waste contamination in Clark Air Base and Subic Naval Base as soon as the US government turned over the bases to the Philippine government. At the time, U.S. government and United Nations reports confirming serious contamination at 46 locations in the two bases had come out. But the U.S. government determined that it was not legally responsible for the cleanup.

Various Philippine administrations have sought to get the US government to take responsibility for the cleanup of the wastes, but to no avail.

== Philippines–United States military cooperation after the bases treaty ==
While the end of the US Bases Treaty marked an end to permanent bases, and supposedly the end of permanent US military presence in the Philippines, the Philippines and the United States later signed a number of agreements for the purpose of facilitating bilateral military cooperation between the two countries. The most significant of these have been the Philippines–United States Visiting Forces Agreement which came into effect in May 1999; and the Enhanced Defense Cooperation Agreement which came into effect in April 2014.

=== The Enhanced Defense Cooperation Agreement ===
On April 28, 2014, the Philippines and the US signed the Enhanced Defense Cooperation Agreement (EDCA), effective for a period of ten years and thereafter, unless terminated by either party by giving one year's written notice. This allowed US forces and contractors to operate out of "agreed locations" defined as "facilities and areas that are provided by the Government of the Philippines through the Armed Forces of the Philippines (AFP)".

In April 2015, the United States government asked for access to eight bases in the Philippines, including the formerly American Subic Bay Naval Base, and Clark Air Base, as well as locations in Luzon, Cebu, and Palawan.

Original EDCA bases: 1 = Antonio Bautista Air Base (Palawan), 2 = Cesar Basa Air Base (Pampanga), 3 = Benito Ebuen Air Base (Cebu), 4 = Fort Magsaysay (Nueva Ecija), 5 = Lumbia Airport (Cagayan de Oro)
Bases added in 2023: 6 = Naval Station Narciso del Rosario (Balabac Island, Palawan), 7 = Camp Melchor F. dela Cruz (Gamu, Isabela), 8 = Lal-lo Airport (Lal-lo, Cagayan), 9 = Naval Base Camilo Osias (Santa Ana, Cagayan)

On March 19, 2016, the Philippines and the United States government agreed on 5 locations of military bases for the American troops under the EDCA:

- Antonio Bautista Air Base (Palawan)
- Basa Air Base (Pampanga)
- Benito Ebuen Air Base (Cebu)
- Fort Magsaysay (Nueva Ecija)
- Lumbia Airport (Cagayan de Oro)

In November 2022, the Philippine Department of National Defense released a statement saying, "The Department is committed to accelerate the implementation of the Edca by concluding infrastructure enhancement and repair projects, developing new infrastructure projects at existing Edca locations, and exploring new locations that will build a more credible mutual defense posture".

On February 2, 2023, four additional locations of military bases were designated under the EDCA. On April 3, 2023, the locations of the four new EDCA sites were announced:

- Balabac Island (Palawan)
- Camp Melchor Dela Cruz (Gamu, Isabela)
- Lal-lo Airport (Lal-lo, Cagayan)
- Naval Base Camilo Osias (Santa Ana, Cagayan)

The governors of Isabela and Cagayan, which together host three of the bases, expressed dismay at the agreement, stating they had not been consulted on the sites and did not want their provinces to pay too much for the infrastructure improvements or become potential targets of Chinese or North Korean nuclear attack.

== See also ==
- Philippines–United States relations
- United States military deployments
- Naval Air Station Cubi Point
- CIA activities in the Philippines
