= CIA activities in the Philippines =

The Central Intelligence Agency has been active in the Philippines almost since the agency's creation in the 1940s. The Philippines were frequently of great value to the CIA's operations in the second half of the 20th century. The United States has long had a clandestine intelligence apparatus in the Philippines. The Philippines have always been considered an important asset to the United States. There was a strong American influence until 1992.

The CIA's main headquarters for Southeast Asia is located in Manila, the capital of the Philippines. The CIA was founded in 1947 and soon began to play a major role in Philippine affairs. The presence of US military bases in the Philippines, originally conceived through the 1947 Military Bases Agreement giving the United States authorization to utilize Clark Field and Subic Bay, made it highly accessible to the agency.

During this time, the CIA ran many covert operations in the country and employed it as a base to launch actions against other countries. The agency had supply, training, and logistical centers on multiple Philippine islands. After their successful counterinsurgency against the Hukbalahap, the CIA reused this model in both Vietnam and Latin America.The Hukbalahap rebellion provided the agency with valuable information and strategies that were later applied in the previously stated places.

The Philippines also served as a laboratory for refining counterinsurgency tactics, showcasing the global influence of the CIA's operations. The CIA also deployed psychological warfare in the Philippines which went beyond conventional intelligence tactics. The agency attempted to create an environment that supported its strategic objectives by influencing social dynamics and public perceptions. This meant influencing attitudes within the country as well as pursuing international threats. The Philippines served as a testing ground for innovative psychological warfare techniques, reflecting the CIA's adaptability in information and influence to operations. The CIA also engaged in violent action in order to advance its agenda.

The establishment of a military base in the Philippines serves a dual-purpose beneficial to both the United States and the Philippines. Strategically, it functions as a deterrent against Soviet and Communist influences in the region. Economically, it fosters growth among US allies without imposing significant strains on their defense budgets. Additionally, it provides the United States with a strategic point for rapid military deployment and power projection in the Pacific. This partnership enhances the security and defense capabilities of both nations, ensuring mutual protection and support.

The Philippines, formally titled the Republic of the Philippines, is an archipelago nation in Southeast Asia between the Philippine Sea and the South China Sea to the east of Vietnam. It is the main "US imperial power [base] in Southeast Asia," according to Roland G. Simbulan of the University of the Philippines. Credible allegations exist revealing that the CIA has operated in support of the pro-American for big businesses such as Coca-Cola which is called Crony capitalism oligarchy in the Philippines, and uses its resources to advance the interests of American corporations such as Ford, Nike, and Coca-Cola. The CIA and the United States have consistently played a role in political and economic life of the Philippines. The Filipino counterpart to the CIA is the National Intelligence Coordinating Agency (NICA), with which it cooperates. The Central Intelligence Agency has long undergone major political involvement within the Philippines. Throughout the history of the agency, they have been influencing and organizing by blackmail, brute force, or funds to engage in political intervention. While covert operation and sabotage for American gain may be more limited to date, the CIA demonstrated their ability to influence by engaging with the political powers in the Philippines.

== Hukbalahap (Huk) rebellion ==
In 1898, the Philippines became a colony of the US after the territory was relinquished by Spain following the American victory of the Spanish–American War lasting from April–August 1898. During World War II, the Imperial Japanese Army occupied the islands from 1942 to 1945 and where General MacArthur vowed to return to the island. The Hukbalahap (Huk) was formed in order to fend off the Japanese during their occupation. The Huk resistance created strongholds throughout Philippine villages using guerrilla warfare tactics. During this time, the movement was widespread and largely successful. After the Philippines were liberated by the Americans and Filipino troops, the US began to influence and control the Philippine government once again. The US ordered the Philippine government to disarm and arrest the Huks, These activities were overseen by the Counterintelligence Corps, a predecessor to the CIA. The Huks advocated a communist ideology which would make them a threat in post-World War II. With aid from the US, the Philippine military began to hunt down the Huks. The guerillas took refuge in the mountains and soon began to counter-attack the Philippine government. The Huk Rebellion not only had local implications but also drew attention on the international stage, with allegations of Soviet support for the Hukbalahap. This external support added a layer of complexity to the conflict, linking it to the broader Cold War dynamics and the ideological struggle between the superpowers.

As the amount of free trade between the US and the Philippines increased, landowners began to favor the cultivation and exportation of cash crops to the US such as tobacco and sugarcane over rice and cereals, which resulted in a reduced food supply for the peasants which would lead to other issues much later on relating to starvation.

During this period, the agricultural sector in the Philippines experienced significant transformation. Farmers increasingly prioritized trade with the United States over local markets. Traditional landowners began employing tenants under legal contracts, establishing a rentier relationship aimed at maximizing profits. These tenants were responsible for the arduous labor on the farms as stipulated by their contracts. This new landlord-tenant dynamic imposed severe hardships on the peasants, making survival challenging.

In response, farmers sought innovative cultivation methods to increase profitability. They discovered that utilizing farming machinery, similar to that used in the US, allowed for more efficient use of time and resources. As machinery became prevalent, farmers were seldom seen working their own lands. The new tenant farming arrangements proved more onerous than traditional ones, with returns skewed 60/40 in favor of the landowners, compared to the previous 50/50 split. This inequity was deemed unsustainable by the Hukbalahap (Huks), a local resistance movement.

The in-sustainability was rooted in the new division between the elite and the poor. The peasants then came together to host riots and strikes against the elite in efforts to revert the Philippines back to the "old" tactics of farming. Their efforts were futile as the elite received support from the United States.

Peasants decided to form their own social organizations as a way to voice concerns, demanding change and a reinforced protection of their rights. After numerous protests and strikes, the status quo between the peasants and the landowners remained. As a result, the peasants decided to join forces with the Huks to combat the economic injustices. The union of the peasants and the Huks intensified the "Huk-resistance" against the government of the Philippines. The Huks developed major influence in local politics with an image of "Robin Hood and taking from the rich and helping the poor". Huks were hunted continuously by the Philippine and US governments. There is a dispute as to how ingrained a Marxist–Leninist communist ideology was within the organization, but they appeared to have some connections with subgroups of the Communist Party. The massacre of Huk squadron 77, that occurred in February 1945, consisted of 109 Huks who were shot and buried in a mass grave by Filipinos and US soldiers.

On August 24, 1948, the CIA received a message from Filipino Secretary of Defense Ruperto Kangleon. This message detailed a peace offering from the Huks to the Filipino government. Their demands included an American expulsion, the cancellation of all base agreements with the United States, and the cancellation of the trade parity. Any cessation in hostility or truces that took place during that time period were only at the top level between government officials and peasant leaders. The fighting on the ground continued largely unabated. Kangleon saw these demands as detrimental to Filipino interests. Kangleon also informed the CIA that he had come into possession of recordings of high-ranking Huks meeting with leading communists. These recordings implicated President Elpidio Quirino's brother as being a communist, causing upheaval for the government. Kangleon also claimed that the Huks were preparing to overthrow the Filipino government in the advent of war between the Soviet Union and the United States. It was even alleged that the Soviet Union was supplying the Huk rebellion with guns, ammunition and supplies via submarine shipments.

On September 15, 1951, the CIA released an assessment on the strength of the Huk. Based on the assessment, the Huk had reached the peak of strength in 1950. The danger of the Huks overthrowing the government had receded. Factors that contributed to the increase of strength included a lack of funds in the public treasury, low export prices, exposed scandals involving high Filipino government officials and the public concern of local government payments being balanced. The outcome of these negative factors enabled the Hukbalahap to gain a large amount of support from the peasants. The CIA would later form their own organizations or would manipulate their own organizations for their own interests.

On April 15, 1950, the CIA issued an information report regarding Huk arms from US surplus and the location of Huk leaders in Singapore. The report first noted that the Huks possessed approximately 100 bazookas from US surplus that they would use in their main offensive. The CIA also reached an assessment that Huk leaders Mariano Balgos and Guillermo Capadocia were not in Singapore. They based this evaluation on the improvement of Huk coordination and leadership, leading the CIA to believe that the leaders were taking part in the action on the battlefield.

== Manila ==
Regarded as a "stronghold of US imperial power in Asia," the Philippines capital, Manila, has been the main station or regional headquarters for the United States CIA since the late-1940s. In connections to its operations, Filipino recruits were trained as part of American and CIA covert operations, forming a larger of the CIA's covert network in Manila and the larger Southeast Asia region. These recruits were themselves American Filipinos, who were heavily influenced by American culture. Willingly, they offered themselves to provide critical intelligence for the United States and its CIA. However, unknown to them, such actions seem engaging in treason against their own country folks on behalf of the CIA. Intelligence collection in Manila was crucial for informing the CIA of the events leading up to the proclamation of martial law in 1972. They were provided with a copy of Proclamation 1081 and Marco's list of people who he planned to imprison. They were also able to gauge Marco's health by receiving information from the doctors who treated him for kidney failure. In the early 1950s, the CIA established the Trans-Asiatic Airlines Inc. as a front to recruit veteran Filipino war pilots and veterans from the Armed Forces of the Philippines' Military Intelligence Services (MIS) who were active in their service still.

Through Manila, the CIA and the Joint US Military Advisory Group (JUSMAG) engineered the bloody suppression of the nationalist Hukbong Mapagpalaya ng Bayan (HMB). Success from this CIA suppression was made into a model for future counterinsurgency operations including the Phoenix Program in Vietnam and a multitude of missions in Latin America including the overthrow of Chilean President Salvadore Allende in 1973. CIA agents Lansdale and Valeriano used their counter-guerrilla experiences in the Philippines to train covert operatives for Vietnam and guerrilla assassins for Latin America. The Philippines became the CIA's prototype in successful covert operations and psychological warfare.

Also, in Manila, the CIA was able to possess and control the "Regional Service Center" (RSC). The RSC is a CIA front for the United States Information Service. This state-of-the-art printing facility covertly serves as a propaganda plant, and it has the capabilities to manufacture large amounts of first-rate color magazines, posters, and pamphlets in at least 14 different Asian Languages. During the Vietnam War, the RSC was involved in the CIA attempts to sabotage North Vietnam economy. The RSC counterfeit North Vietnam currency and airdropped through the North Vietnam territory in order to paralyze the resistance.

In a lecture given at the University of the Philippines Manila on August 18, 2000, Roland B. Simbulan, Coordinator of the Manila Studies Program, said of the CIA's presence in the Philippines: "The CIA in the Philippines has engaged in countless covert operations for intervention and dirty tricks particularly in Philippine domestic policies. On top of all this is the US diplomatic mission, especially the political section that is a favorite cover for CIA operatives. CIA front companies also provide an additional but convenient layer for operatives assigned overseas. "In general, wherever you find U.S. big business interests...you also find a very active CIA." These business interests include big corporations such as Nike, United Fruits, Coca~Cola, Ford, and Citicorp. Relatedly, CIA operative David Sternberg fronted as a foreign correspondent for an American newspaper based in Boston, The Christian Science Monitor, when he assisted Gabriel Kaplan in managing the presidential campaign of Ramon Magsaysay."

On April 18, 1973, National Security Advisor Henry Kissinger discussed the possibility of the United States State Department to consider providing assistance in improving the Manila police administration in the form of equipment and expert advice. The discussion of merging the 17 separate departments into one was highlighted in this letter.

== 1940s ==
After being driven out of the country by the Empire of Japan in 1942, the Allies returned in 1944 and liberated the Philippines from Japanese occupation. This notably improved relations between the United States and the Philippine people. After the war, the United States granted the Philippines independence. In 1947, two years after the surrender of Japan, the CIA released a country report on the Philippines that assessed the political and economic conditions of the newly independent nation. It further attributed political stability to the pro-American, liberal democratic Roxas administration, which maintained a strong political position and had successfully deterred violent opposition from the Hukbalahap leftist organization. The report also concluded that, wartime damage aside, the country appeared to be financially stable. US economic aid, provided in the form of both direct and indirect assistance, was based on prior commitments the United States had made to the Philippines. The US government promised to “assist in making the Philippines...economically secure.” The total direct financial aid provided in 1947 and expected to be fully paid by 1950 exceeded $800 million and was filed under the Philippine Rehabilitation Act. Indirect aid came in the form of military and naval equipment, veterans' benefits, and army and navy expenditures. The indirect aid was valued at $700 million in 1951.

The report emphasized the important political and economic impacts that US assistance had on Filipino government. The improvement of infrastructure, industry, and agriculture helped lift the Philippines out of financial disorganization and possible political instability. The aid also increased popular support for the pro-American Roxas regime. However, while US assistance aimed to build up the nation, it did not come without political objectives. The report described the aims of the US government in providing the aid which included the solidification of a "strong independent, democratic, and friendly Republic." The report expressed optimistic beliefs that the Roxas regime would implement fiscal reforms that would further consolidate political stability. The report suggests that financial assistance should be a last resort and if the appropriate measures are taken, the Philippines will not be able to obtain financial aid from the US. It also suggests that any support or assistance should be technical and administrative. The report concluded that policy objectives from both the CIA and the State Department should encourage the Philippines to participate with the United Nations and its specialized agencies.

== 1950s ==
In 1950, the CIA studied conditions that were causing unrest. A partially declassified intelligence memorandum titled "The Situation in the Philippines" from June 1950 highlighted how the CIA viewed the political situation in the Philippines. While the agency believed that after President Quirino fell, a US-allied government would follow, it stressed that the Philippines could become a communist country should conditions continue to deteriorate. It found that Filipino trust in their president was steadily decreasing due to his administration's lack of power. They determined the ineptitude of then-President Quirino would lead to political upheaval rendering the Philippine police and military incapable at maintaining law and order in the country or stopping Hukbalahap raids in Luzon. It was initially believed that the political instability in the Philippines would drive President Quirino out of office and possibly be succeeded by a pro-US replacement. However, if the instability were to continue to worsen for another decade or so after that, the likelihood of a communist takeover would greatly increase.

A declassified report from the CIA mentions that "in early 1950 the Huks numbered some 20,000 and were gaining support as a result of popular disillusion with the government and ill-disciplined armed forces". The Huks had been able to perform successful raids against President Quirino. The success of the Huk raids relied “on mass support, without which they [could not] win or even exist". By the end of 1951, the Huks lost a large portion of their fighting forces due to Magsaysay bringing order back to the Filipino military.

The election of 1951 was not rigged, producing a big effect on the population of the Philippines. The Huks had tried to stop the voter participation with slogans including "Boycott the Election." However, many of the Huks ranks soon scattered and turned themselves in to authorities. Groups of Huks began to come into army camps, voluntarily surrendering and commenting bitterly that they had been misled by their leaders. In 1952, support for the Huks was close to non-existent. The Huks withdrew most forces from their old heartland in the Northern Manila province. The main Huk forces retreated south into the jungles where they set up new camps and new headquarters. The Huks believed they were safe from the Philippine forces and would have time to rebuild. The Philippine army and the US Battalion Combat Team (BCT) hunted the Huks into the jungles, once again forcing the rebels to relocate.

Shortly after becoming Defense Minister in 1950, future Philippines president Ramon Magsaysay began a series of programs to undermine the popularity of the Huks nationally. The first program organized a Defense Corps, starting from 1950 and ending in 1955, to resettle Huks and their families. In 1954, in order to win more favor from the general populace, Magsaysay created the National Resettlement and Rehabilitation agency, which redistributed land to the peasants of the Philippines, as well as encouraging migration to the more rural areas of the country. By the time Magsaysay died in 1957, he had completely undermined the Huk movement, changing it from a strong movement with thousands of armed insurgents to a few hundred with little public support.

The CIA engaged in psyops. They spread rumors that there was a local aswang or "vampire". They then punctured holes in the corpse of a Huk and drained all the blood from his body before leaving the body to be discovered on a road. According to a retrospective study of the anti-Huk counterinsurgency, local anti-communist Filipinos were recruited as part of OPERATION COVERUP. As part of COVERUP, anti-communist were trained in "special operations and in impersonating the insurgents," before settling "into the local community as farmers and laborers. From their base in a house rented by the unit...they reported on guerrilla activities, ambushed several Huk patrols, and carried out a number of 'snatch' operations against local Huk officials. Before the operation ended, seventy Huk officials disappeared and almost all guerrilla activities in the area were documented."

The report also describes another psyop meant to sow discord among the Huk insurgents, stating that "a plane flew over a small battle and called down to the surprised Huks below by name. As the pilot departed, he thanked several 'informers' on the ground and wished them good luck in escaping injury as a result of helping the Army find their unit. The Huks stared at one another, especially those whose names were called out, and wondered how much of what they had just heard was true. Could their comrades be informers? They just couldn't be sure." This operation was a success; the report notes that "several mock trials were held and more than one innocent guerrilla was put before a convenient wall. Those who watched the execution must surely have prayed that the next plane to fly over them didn't have a list with their names on it."

The CIA's experiments in psychological warfare would have a lasting impact on American counterinsurgencies throughout the twentieth and twenty-first centuries; When CIA director Allen Dulles assigned Edward Lansdale to Indochina, he told Lansdale "to do what you did in the Philippines [in Vietnam]." Lansdale's successes in the Philippines greatly influenced the development of the Phoenix Program, the CIA-led program of surveillance, abduction, and torture intended to disrupt the Viet Cong insurgency in South Vietnam.

On September 6, 1955, the United States and the Philippines signed the Laurel-Langley Agreement, which amended the Bell Trade Act. The Laurel-Langley Agreement reduced the dependency of the Filipino economy on the US economy and brought down tariffs. The United States could no longer control the ratio of the US money to Filipino money.

As stated in a lecture at the University of the Philippines-Manila, Professor Roland G. Simbulan demonstrated that at this time the CIA was covertly sponsoring the Security Training Center on the outskirts of Manila as a, "countersubversion, counter-guerrilla and psychological warfare school." The CIA was worried that they and the Philippine government were losing control of the rural areas of the Philippines to the Huks and their perceived Communist ideology. Through this organization, CIA funds were funneled into the National Citizens' Movement for Free Elections (NAMFREL) community centers, the Philippine Action in Development, and through the Asia Foundation. First called the "Committee for a Free Asia," CIA Operative Gabriel Kaplan created the Asia Foundation that has been described as the "principal CIA front" in 1956. The Asia Foundation would pour excessive amounts of money for anti-communist organizations and influential mediums throughout the Philippines. The University of the Philippines, journals/news outlets, civic organizations, and most spaces of academia have received funding from the Asia Foundation to encourage US foreign and military policy. It was not until the 1967 exposure of the CIA that the agency's association to the Asia Foundation became known. Instead of funding to the foundation being completely cut off, the agency created a "severance payment" to encourage the arrangement of alternative sources of funding.

Public service ads were made and broadcast during the height of global Soviet aggression and the country initiated a large-scale anti-Communist campaign. Propaganda was produced depicting the hard and terrible life one would live under communist rule and how one would lose their autonomy as well as their religion and families. The US reinforced its interests by backing American businesses and American-funded organizations. The American government did this by funneling grant money via USAID, National Endowment for Democracy (NED), and the Ford Foundation. The constant stream of financial backing rewarded the Filipino elite for promoting American interests. Community Planning Development Center requests for millions of dollars could generate possibilities for "projects such as feeder roads, pure water, irrigation, additional cooperatives, and warehousing facilities." By creating better standards of living for the poor, Magsaysay could combat communism by undercutting the need for it. Therefore, Magsaysay focused on "rural rehabilitation" to help the lowest income bracket. Magsaysay wanted to develop a program to eliminate the poverty and enrich the rural, lower class. However, this fostered an economic dependence on American funds—a double-edged sword for the Philippines. All of these efforts were in order to influence the rural Filipino people to support the American-backed government. Thus, the Philippines were one of the first locations in which the CIA attempted psychological operations alongside force to influence its desired outcomes.

Philippine president Ramon Magsaysay entrusted Colonel Edward Lansdale as his military adviser and also as his speechwriter. Secretly Lansdale was working for the CIA and funneled $1 million of agency money to Magsaysay, along with additional funds from the Coca Cola Company. Through Lansdale's influence on Magsaysay, the US was able to spread American policy into Southeast Asia. Many programs were launched by the United States such as: Freedom Company of the Philippines, Eastern Construction Company, and "Operation Brotherhood" which allowed Filipino personnel to deploy in other Asian countries for covert Filipino operations. Actively using the Philippines territories, the CIA was able to establish supply as well as training and logistics bases on several Philippines islands. This included the Tawi-Tawi Island of Sanga-Sanga, which was a base for an airstrip. These were employed for the mission to overthrow the Indonesian President Sukarno and destroy the Indonesian left-wing. The CIA specifically supported Indonesian colonels who disapproved of Sukarno and trained them and other subversives at the above-mentioned bases. In this way, the CIA provided aid, advice, and instructions directly to military rebel groups.

In the summer of 1952, Philippine president Ramon Magsaysay offered the Huks a choice of either all-out friendship or all-out force. Magsaysay's presidential term was set to end in December 1957, however, before he could leave office, he died in a plane crash in March 1957. According to a Memo intended for the Director of Central Intelligence, the death of Magsaysay caused the political polarization of the Philippines to intensify. The CIA believed that Magsaysay's death would initiate an upheaval, causing different political groups to compete for power. They also believed that US-Philippine relations would decline because there was no acceptable replacement that would have the same connections to the US. It also addressed the possibility that along with the death of Magsaysay, pro-American sentiment may decrease. More specifically, it warned against the possible rise of nationalism and communism as forces that could begin to influence policy in the Philippines, namely policies that were not in the best interest of the United States. This would begin to shape future US policy with the Philippines, as the fear of communism began to rise. However, there were hopes of the Liberal Party taking over the political spectrum with their possible candidate Jose Yulo. Yulo is held in high regard to his integrity and ability to lead and he also is pro-American. Carlos Garcia, being the incumbent, had a great advantage, but was facing a strong opposition with the little time he had to exploit his position.

== 1960s ==
In 1957, the CIA expressed concern over a potential political uprising in the region, and particularly of a communist Huk resurgence. According to an official CIA report from April 18, 1967, the group had gained considerable influence over the past 20 months. The report states, "The number of armed cadre has grown from an estimated 37 to 300-400, and the US embassy in Manila estimates that mass base support has increased by five to eight percent.". The presidential elections that were occurring that year were sent into disarray after President Ramon Magsaysay died in an aircraft accident, leading to political disarray throughout the country and a slight decay of US-Philippines relations. In 1960, the CIA recognized Philippine concern over a Huk resurgence in the region after killings on the island of Luzon, where Manila is located. The armed forces were called in fear of a communist uprising, but most of the fears went unwarranted at the time. While the Huk resurged in the 1960s, they were not able to cause an insurrection like that of their earlier attempt again.

While they did not believe they posed too large of a threat, there was concern that "any failure by Marcos to reduce Huk influence could" cost him the election. In 1966, the CIA was concerned if there were nuclear weapons stored in the Philippine due to the reports given by Robert McClintock. President Marcos did know of the Nuclear weapons. It was crucial for the Philippine government to be unaware of this as it might threaten the US-Philippine relations and affect the elections.

From 1965 to 1967, the Huk began to show an increase in presence again with new activity in the region and a growth in strength. There were 17 assassinations and killings in 1965, and the number spiked to 71 in 1967. Although most of these assassinations and killings were of smaller figures, the greatest act of terror carried out in this period was the assassination of Mayor Anastasio Gallardo of Candaba who was the chairman of the anti-HUK mayors league. The assassination occurred while he was on his way to meet with President Marcos. This event froze the League of anti-HUK mayors out of fear the same would happen to them.

In 1965, President Ferdinand Marcos took office commencing a 20-year presidency.

In 1967, President Marcos began to make attempts to slow growth of the Huks by promoting developmental efforts in the Central Luzon region. The CIA intelligence, however, reported that the programs were having minimal impact on the region or the Huks influence. The Huks were still able to maintain some power through voter intimidation and helping impoverished peasants. The Huks successfully entered politics in 1967 with a slate 23 affiliates who successfully gained office. The CIA estimated that there were still around 140 armed rebels and that sympathizers numbered around 30,000. Their activity had also increased, the assassinations had increased to around 70 people, originally starting at around only 17. At the same time, President Marcos began to increase efforts fighting the remaining Huks, but with their recent election success, the CIA deemed his efforts inconsistent. Early in 1967, suspecting the growth in Huk activity signified an increase of their power, the CIA concluded that same year that the Huks possessed little communist influence left in their overall ideology and proved little to no further threat to the government of the Philippines.

In 1969, a memorandum concerning U.S. commitments abroad circulated among US officials. The memo indicated that there could be a disastrous fallout between the US and Philippines should word spread that US had been storing nuclear weapons in the Philippines without the prior consent of the Filipino government. A subsequent memo disclosed that, although the Filipino public and government was unaware of the stored weapons, Marcos had secretly known about them, yet did not reveal their existence as it would have been disadvantageous in the upcoming elections.

== 1970s ==
In 1971, the previous flames of communism within the Philippines that the CIA thought that they had extinguished had reappeared with a terror attack on August 21, 1971, at a Liberal party rally that was held in Manila's Plaza Miranda that killed 9 and injured 11 and led to all of the Liberal Opposition to Marcos to be killed.

In 1972, hostilities increased between the Philippine government and Moro Muslims in Mindanao seeking independence (see the Moro conflict for more information). The Nixon Administration received a request from the Marcos government for additional military aid to fight the insurrection; however, for both budgetary and strategic reasons, US officials were hesitant to increase military assistance. The Department of Defense estimated that Muslim insurgents were numbered up to 17,000 but were lightly armed. However, US officials feared the continuation of the Muslim insurrection would further destabilize President Marcos who faced several other internal challenges. While the Nixon White House wanted to support Marcos in order to protect US interests in the Philippines, increased military support risked straining US relations with Malaysia and Indonesia—especially if the Philippine military's suppression of the Moro insurrection resulted in heavy civilian casualties. In the background of the whole Moro crisis in July 1972, the Chinese communist government sent a shipment of weapons to the growing CPP-NPA, but was seized by the Armed Forces of the Philippines. The Special National Intelligence Estimate 56–73 of March 28, 1973 took the position that Marcos should seek a political compromise that would "stop the major fighting and allow the Christians and the Muslims to coexist" with the US, inducing Marcos with "economic development assistance and refugee aid for the south, along with the speed-up of [Military Assistance Program] support currently planned." Furthermore, a CIA assessment from July 1973 concluded Marcos' government was not in imminent danger of falling. Finally, as fighting between the Philippines military and insurgents became more intense, Secretary of State Henry Kissinger advocated that the Ford Administration not cut any US financial aid to the Philippines.

On April 7, 1973, a memorandum was sent to the Secretary of Defense describing the US position on the island of Sabah in a statement describing the Philippine claim on it as weak. The US claimed neutrality, but suggested not pressuring the Filipino government in giving up its claims. They suggested knowingly that the US would support Marcos if he chooses to pursue sovereignty over Sabah.

In July 1974, the Laurel-Langley Agreement expired, which left the United States nervous about future trade with the Philippines. Before the agreement expired, the United States had exemptions to the Philippine Constitution, which gave them more freedom in trade. The United States quickly began to negotiate a new trade agreement in Manila, named the Treaty of Economic Cooperation and Development. This treaty was meant to provide: "Protection of legal (personal and property) rights of U.S. citizens in the Philippines," the "Guarantees of non-discriminatory treatment for U.S. investors," and "Assurance that the Philippines will benefit from any U.S. Generalized System of Preferences for developing countries." The US was also offering a reduction in tariffs for goods such as coconut oil and other resources of which the Philippines was the chief global supplier. However, President Marcos made the creation of a new trade agreement difficult, which led to many roadblocks in establishing a new agreement.

The main conflict to establishing a new agreement was President Marcos' insistence on a new Military Base Agreement. The US was hesitant to meet President Marcos' demands as revising the Military Base Agreement would require Congress to create a new treaty, which would have given "a higher profile to the negotiations" than desired. Secretary Kissinger met with Foreign Secretary Romulo in New York on October 6, 1976, to discuss the treaty. Discussions focused on provisions in the treaty requiring the US to protect "the metropolitan area of the Philippines" in addition to the US bases. Romulo requested supplies from the US to strengthen the Philippines' armed forces and said "his government was afraid of being subjected to nuclear attack." Additional discussion regarded the timing of finalization of the treaty, the advantages if some decisions were finalized before that year's US presidential election, and the US' financial package to the Philippines. Romulo instructed Ambassador Romualdez to present the proposal to President Marcos immediately upon his return to Manila on October 10, 1976. President Marcos was not satisfied with the proposal, as evident by the embassy in the Philippines suggesting that the US consider changing their stance on paying rent for their use of military bases in the Philippines. However, the US remained adamant about not paying rent; in a letter to Kissinger on December 29, Secretary of Defense Donald Rumsfeld wrote: "The US should not pay rent to its allies for bases which serve the common weal."

In 1977, public warnings circulated that President Marcos might dissolve the arrangement with US military bases. Marcos being influenced by his staff to protect their strategic interest and force the U.S. to agree to his terms.

=== First Lady Imelda Marcos ===
During the mid 1970s, President Marcos' wife, Imelda, played a small role in relations between the US and the Philippines. Attempting to meet and have tea with First Lady Betty Ford in 1974, as she had with First Lady Thelma "Pat" Nixon in 1971, Mrs. Marcos looked to seize the opportunity to persuade the US president and First Lady into providing additional support to the Philippines. In a memorandum dated November 7, 1974, National Security Advisor Brent Snowcroft outlined the potential fallout of having such a meeting. Despite the advantages of promoting friendly relations and reassurance that the US supports the Philippines, the advisor strongly opposed the two women meeting for tea. Instead, he noted that there was a possibility of exploitation for political control that could cause criticism; she may request more military assistance and push for publicity surrounding the Philippines. He further mentioned that the US should not view Mrs. Marcos as the go-between the East-West relations. Mrs. Marcos' requests to have tea with both First Ladies called into question her motives and suggested a lasting effect on Philippine-US relations.

Desperate and hardheaded, Mrs. Marcos used her trips to the US to plead with the President and First Lady regarding communist infiltration into the Philippines. The memorandum dated August 8, 1975, from Snowcroft to the Secretary of State Henry Kissinger, further outlined the pressure Mrs. Marcos presented when attempting to have her voice heard. It stated that Ambassador Sullivan strongly suggested that Mrs. Marcos did in fact have some political pull and it could be a potential benefit to include her in the US-Philippine negotiations of aid. Seeing the possibility that Mrs. Marcos could be a back channel into the Philippines, Snowcroft eventually agreed. While only responsible for a small portion of the requests for the Philippines to gain assistance from the US, Mrs. Marcos' consistent background influence played enough of a part to not only be included in political documents, but also gain the attention of the President and high-ranking officials. When continually turned down for meetings with the US, Mrs. Marcos saw an advantage to gain aid from primarily communist countries based on their natural resources that could potentially provide the Philippines. Thus, putting her on the radar for US concerns with communist influence.[4]

=== Martial law in the Philippines ===
On September 22, 1972, President Marcos declared martial law in the country under the pretext of protecting it from communist threats due to the allegation against the CPP-NPA that they had attempted to kill Defense Minister Juan Pounce Enrile. The CIA had known about this declaration and reported it back to the US government. Marcos had been debating several options to stay in power, such as delaying the elections or running a surrogate candidate, but he found imposing martial law to be the easiest path. Marcos quickly jailed his political rivals and seized his goal of rewriting the constitution to remain in power for the foreseeable future. Marcos justified his use of martial law in an attempt to "restructure" the Philippine society. He asserted that all his decrees were well within legal constraints. At the time, the United States believed that Marcos was an appropriate leader for the country. Although he had enacted martial law, the US chose to assist Marcos in his reforming project. As long as Marcos appeared to be enhancing the prospects for long term stability and as long as he continued to cooperate with the US.Foreign Relations of the United States, 1969–1976, Volume E–12, Documents on East and Southeast Asia, 1973–1976 - Office of the Historian

Marcos claimed that martial law was a necessary response to terrorism, particularly a series of deadly bombings from 1971, including one that killed nine people at Plaza Miranda. The CIA was aware that Marcos stood responsible for at least one of these attacks and were almost certain that they were not perpetrated by communists. The agency did not share this information with the opposition. The CIA did, however, bribe opposition politicians not to challenge the presence of US military bases or dominance of American corporations at the constitutional convention of 1971. President Nixon approved Marcos' martial law initiative because he accepted the Filipino leader's claim that the country was being terrorized by Communists.

Marcos insisted he was going to eradicate corruption through the imposition of martial law. Many people questioned the reason behind Marcos declaring martial law. In this decree, the entire country of the Philippines was considered a land reform area. Peasants were supposed to be given land as a part of this agreement, but when the martial rule ended, less than four percent of peasants owned their land. Only the enemies of Marcos lost their land during martial law. These enemies of Marcos saw their land and businesses taken from them and given to friends and associates of Marcos. The Lopez Clan perhaps suffered the most as Marcos seized all of their profitable businesses. Matters had deteriorated so significantly that the nephew of the former vice president, Geny Lopez, was thrown in jail for being involved in a plot to assassinate the President. With hopes of securing the release of Geny, the Lopez family was forced to give up more of their businesses to Marcos. He inherited the electric company and TV network but did not keep his end of the deal and Geny remained in jail. These events continued the trend of Marcos and those close to him receiving benefits that had been taken from others. This became known as "crony capitalism." The idea of crony capitalism centered around the fact that all major corporations and business interests in the Philippines were controlled by the Marcos family or his close friends and allies. In all, the Marcos family controlled eighteen companies, and the Marcos administration issued formal decrees specifically designed to hurt competition (thus helping themselves) and to "pamper" his cronies. It became clear by July 1973 that Marcos’ plan was not well perceived by the people of the Philippines.Foreign Relations of the United States, 1969–1976, Volume E–12, Documents on East and Southeast Asia, 1973–1976 - Office of the Historian The year 1973 is well documented for internal communications about the status of the Marcos administration. Documents show that the greater concern was continued US access to bases and protection of US investment rather than martial law. Kissinger went on to acknowledge that Philippine government statements about reviewing past treaties with the US were to satiate a malcontent citizenry. Kissinger did point to decreased US grant payments; this explanation for why the Philippine population was unhappy was expanded upon too much, but the focus on continued dealings remained. In April 1973, Henry Kissinger advised Nixon about assisting the Marcos administration with its insurgency issue.

US–Philippine relations were strained due to the US military bases agreements. Though on December 4, 1976, Secretaries Carlos Romulo and Henry A. Kissinger met in regards to the military base agreement as a follow up to an April 12, 1976 meeting. Through grants and credits, the deal required the United States to pay one billion dollars. This agreement did have to go through legislative approval. Days later, Kissinger told Nixon about a State Department initiative to reorganize the police organizations in the Manilla area. On December 11, 1976, President Marcos stated in a public foreign policy address that all US bases must pay rent to the Philippine government. Secretary of Defense Donald Rumsfeld wrote to Secretary of State Henry Kissinger on December 29, 1976, regarding the request. It was Rumsfeld's understanding that the April 12, 1976 meeting with Romulo and Kissinger was understood that the US use of bases in the Philippines was part of a shared security interest. Secretary Rumsfeld stated that this was against US policy and that it was incumbent upon Secretary Kissinger to tell Marcos that the US would not pay rent. Rumsfeld emphasized the benefit was a shared security benefiting both countries, going on to say that if the Philippines did not realize this, "there [would be] no basis for a mutual security treaty". Rumsfeld would state that there were profound implications for military arrangements across the globe. He stated further that it was critical to US-Philippine relations to resolve the matter. Secretary Kissinger and Foreign Secretary Romulo talked negotiation agreements but could not come to conclusions, concluding that multiple issues still needed a resolution. The US attempted to show they were being flexible through useless concessions. They believed this would get the Filipinos to acquiesce to items the US desired in the agreement. Marcos wanted to delicately address the negotiation issues due to the Philippines' violations of human rights which weakened their image to the US. President Marcos had been concerned with the importance of human rights to the US government. This was a major reason for Marcos wanting the US to pay rent for their military bases instead of US military support. It gave an outlet for the Philippine government to avoid congressional questioning.

In August 1977, Marcos relaxed his martial law decrees in an attempt to improve his human rights perception in the US. He believed that this new image would assist in the resumed negotiations with the US on the military bases agreement. Marcos' new stance granted amnesty to certain low-level detainees who agreed to act within the law "voluntarily". Intelligence suggested that there were almost 4,000 detainees, including political detainees. However, amnesty would not be offered to these political prisoners who had been imprisoned since 1972 when martial law was established. Marcos also promised to rid the country of the nationwide curfew with exception to areas the military had previously declared critical.

President Jimmy Carter began to prop up the opposition to Marcos in 1978, and, during this time, the highly popular Ninoy Aquino began to campaign from his prison cell, as he, like all Filipino political dissenters, was incarcerated. Pope John Paul II and President Reagan attempted to force Marcos to loosen his grip on the Filipino people, and martial law was lifted; however, Marcos held on to almost all of the same powers he had under martial law. Fearing that he would be blamed if Ninoy died in the hospital, Marcos allowed Ninoy to be transported to the United States for open heart surgery, where he stayed for three years before returning to the Philippines.

== 1980s ==
In 1979, the United States amended their Military Base Agreement (MBA) with the Philippines in order to quell any public concerns regarding sovereignty of US military bases in the Philippines. Additionally President Ferdinand Marcos wanted to determine how strong the relationship was between the two countries. The main goal was to reaffirm that the US was not looking to expand control or attain more rights in the Philippines, but that they were operating their facilities as normal, keeping the status quo. The amendment addressed flights and transit as it pertained to Middle East oil security, aid package negotiations, and Philippine authority over customs, immigration, and quarantines. Finalized in 1982, the amendment did not negatively effect the use of military bases in the Philippines.

The CIA also considered becoming more involved in the region again in the 1980s, particularly in 1985 before President Ferdinand Marcos left the presidency. The United States needed the Philippines to be a stable democratic ally to prevent the spread of communism in Southeast Asia as well as to keep critical strategic military bases active. An Airgram in 1983 to the State Department from the Manila embassy states that there is corruption and 'crony capitalism' under Marcos' presidency. A correspondence between Carl W. Ford Jr., the officer in charge of intelligence in East Asia, and the director of central intelligence, William J. Casey, indicated that the CIA considered attempting to influence the Philippine government: "at our last meeting you asked that I give more thought to the crucial issue of the Marcos Era drawing to a close, specifically, how the US might go about influencing Marcos to lay down the ground work for a smooth succession." Even then, the document also expresses a fear by the CIA that there would be more communist activity in the region, and that combined with economic issues caused extreme concern.

In the document, Ford Jr. outlined the CIA's distrust of Marcos' government, and the real possibility that his administration did not have a future. He insisted that Marcos' days were limited, and asserted that whether Marcos was removed by "death, retirement, or forcible removal," the CIA would need to be prepared to replace him. He also described six "hypothetical" possibilities associated with the regime change. Three of the options involved Marcos being involved in the transition, while the other three saw Marcos as a problematic figure who would not be part of the new government. In any case, Ford Jr. repeatedly stated his opinion that the US needed to choose and influence Marcos' possible running mate and successor. The troubling nature of this document is revealed by the admittance that the six plans discussed "are not based on any preconceived notion or analysis of root causes of problems today confronting the Philippines." After the assassination of Philippine senator Ninoy Aquino, the CIA began discretely manipulating Filipino leaders to promote US positive reformations, as well as offering $45 million a year for development assistance.

This willingness to dispose of Marcos is further confirmed by a 1985 intelligence report on the CPP-led New People's Army which had been waging an insurgency since 1969. The report expresses the CIA's desire for "the installation of an effective, reform-minded, non-Communist government in Manila," before warning that the situation "could evolve into a prolonged period of 'civil war,' with the government increasingly hard-pressed and insurgent attacks on US persons and installations, growing anti-Americanism, and a period of hard choices for the United States—including if and when to abandon Marcos." In the section titled "Implications for US Interests," the report concludes that "under these circumstances US efforts to prop up Marcos probably would be counterproductive in that the United States would be seen by most Filipinos as supporting an unpopular dictator. As long as Marcos remains in power, we see little prospect for success against the insurgents."

Following the fall of the Marcos' government, the CIA began closely monitoring and assessing the health of the new government, which the CIA's World Factbook refers to as a "people power" movement, under President Corazon Aquino. This was a pivotal period for the CIA in the Philippines. At this time, the CIA was struggling to gain control over the political landscape of the post-Marcos Philippines. The CIA felt threatened by the anti-imperialist groups that emerged in the Philippines after Marcos left power and began advocating for funding various Filipino organizations in attempts to combat these progressive forces. Shortly thereafter, the United States Agency for International Development (USAID) began financially supporting the Trade Union Congress of the Philippines (TUCP) in order to develop an agricultural reform program that would complement other existing programs and mitigate campesino uprising. In addition, the National Endowment for Democracy (NED) gave about $9 million in monetary donations to various Filipino organizations such as TUCP, the Women's Movement for the Nurturing of Democracy (KABATID), Namfrel, and the Philippine Chamber of Commerce and Industry (PCCI) between the mid to late 1980s. The agenda behind all these donations was to popularize the idea of democracy in the region. Towards the end of the 1980s the CIA unleashed an increasingly large amount of covert operations against leftist organizations in the Philippines. $10 million was given to the Armed Forced of the Philippines (AFP) for improved intelligence operations. The CIA increased the size of its personnel and sent more diplomats to the embassy in Manila.

The various coup attempts to oust the new president had the CIA worried about the survival of democracy in the Philippines as well as the effect this would have on U.S. interests in the country. In 1986, the CIA's Directorate of Intelligence office produced a report--"The Philippines' Corazon Aquino: Problems and Perspectives of a New Leader"—which characterized her as "maturing", but inexperienced and "lack[ing] political instincts...to color her perceptions of the problems facing her government and the best way to deal with them." The document goes on to describe her leadership style as populist, because of her emphasis on dialogue with her constituents, and because of her encouraging citizens at every level to become involved in the political process. Instead of acknowledging her attempt to promote a form of democracy in the post-Marcos Philippines, however, the document characterizes her as being overly concerned with her image, relying on personal politics, and as insecure ("not comfortable with her considerable authority"). The document goes on to lament that Aquinos has not publicly stated "what world leaders she respects and would like to emulate", disregarding the leader she had mentioned ("the only prominent figure whom she has said she admires is Mother Theresa of Calcutta"), and then suggests that Ramon Magsaysay would be a good role model, based on the fact that he, too, has "pride in being Filipino." Magsaysay was a former president of the Philippines, accused by his opponents as being an American puppet. In a 1987 memorandum from Carl W. Ford Jr. to the Senior Review Panel he writes, "Recent events in the Philippines--particularly the coup attempt of August 28, and its aftermath--have raised serious questions about the survival of the Aquino government and the prospects for democracy. Should the Aquino government fail, the consequences for the United States will be severe". The document warns against alternative governments taking power because the CIA believed the Aquino government was, "...the best chance over the long term of establishing stability and democracy in the Philippines...". Ford feared that more turmoil in the country would provide a fertile ground for the Communist party to spread malcontent among the people and attempt to expand its influence. The CIA began to investigate the prospects for the short term survival of the Aquino government, its ability to create stability, and what the US could do to shore up and support the new government.

The CIA continued their investigation into the strength of the Filipino government, under the rule of Aquino. The fear of communism loomed over their heads. In a recently declassified document from the CIA, the detailed account of recent contacts from the USSR to the Philippines were outlined. The CIA had noted the increase of communication between the Communist Party of the Philippines and Moscow. The Philippine Maoists were the country's largest communist group, which stirred up fearful emotions on the side of the CIA. The document revealed that the American agency continued to involve themselves in the politics of the Philippines. The documents highlights the change in the Filipino Communist and their notions of the Soviets. As stated, the communists in the Philippines wanted to remain within their own country, until they could no longer do so without funds or military aid, so they began to look outside toward the Soviet Union.

The CIA's misgivings concerning the success of Aquino's presidency did not end with her lack of vocalized admiration for Magsaysay. One 66-page document given to the director of the CIA and prepared for the Philippine Task Force and the Office of East Asian Analysis in April 1986 highlights the CIA's worries over the economic state of the Philippines, citing the post-WWII population boom and Aquino's "massive foreign debt" as an indicator of future financial crisis. The document goes on to predict that the impending financial crisis, compounded with a decrease in the standard of living over the previous five years, agricultural difficulties, and unequal distribution of wealth, will lead to political instability, possibly affecting the CIA's interests in the region. The report details the effects of the population boom and projected population growth, reporting high unemployment rates, inflation, and poverty-related crime rates in the previous ten years, as well as reiterates the amount of foreign debt owed by the country, warning that "how Aquino deals with the debt issue" will have a significant impact on the financial well-being of the country. Although the uncensored parts of this document do not recommend any CIA action pertaining to the financial state of the Philippines, it does reflect the degree to which the CIA kept watch on the economies of its allies.

== 2000s ==
In May 2002, a mysterious incident regarding an explosion at Evergreen Hotel in downtown Davao City and the perpetrator (67-year-old hotel guest Michael Meiring) then being whisked out of the country by US federal agents, gave rise to conspiracy theories that Meiring was responsible for false flag operations designed to induce the Philippine government to grant American authorities greater influence locally in regards to the war on terror. Articles in the BusinessWorld newspaper specifically accused Meiring of being a Central Intelligence Agency operative involved in covert operations in Southeast Asia, who staged terrorist atrocities to destabilize the Mindanao region with the intent to justify increased military operations against the MILF, and thus incentivize an increased US military presence in the Philippines.

Philippine military officers involved in the Oakwood mutiny alleged that the 2003 Davao City airport bombing, along with a second Sasa ferry terminal bombing at the Port of Davao a few weeks later, were false flag operations involving US intelligence agencies. In 2016, President Rodrigo Duterte was quoted by the media in linking the terrorist attacks on Davao City airport and Sasa ferry port, along with the earlier Evergreen Hotel explosion, to covert American intelligence agencies such as the CIA.
