= Puerto Princesa International Airport =

Commercial airport serving Puerto Princesa, Palawan, Philippines

Puerto Princesa International Airport Paliparang Pandaigdig ng Puerto Princesa
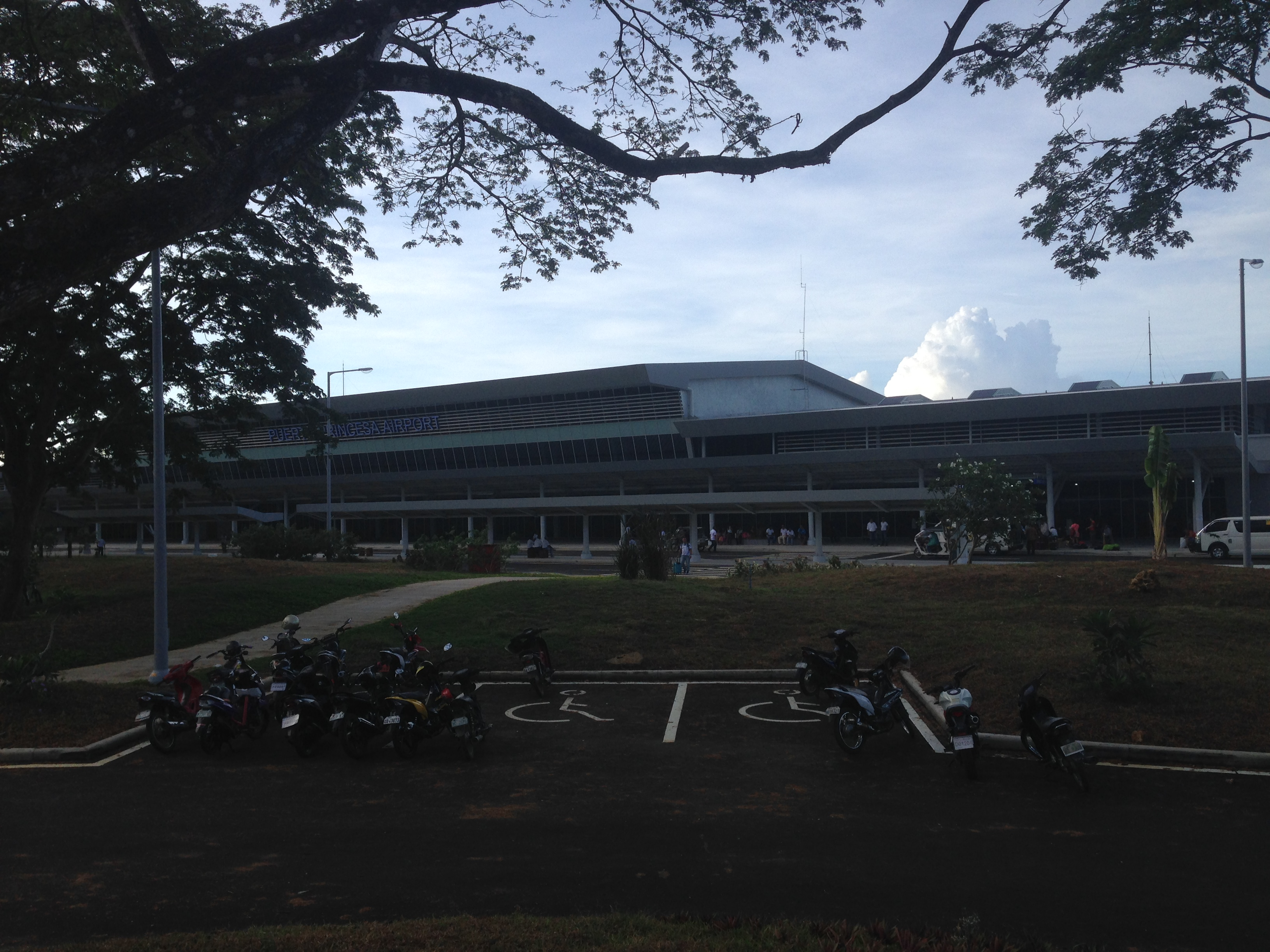
- IATA: PPS; ICAO: RPVP; WMO: 98618

Summary
- Airport type: Public / Military
- Owner/Operator: Civil Aviation Authority of the Philippines
- Serves: Puerto Princesa
- Opened: 1947; 79 years ago
- Operating base for: Air Juan
- Time zone: PHT (UTC+08:00)
- Elevation AMSL: 22 m (72 ft)
- Coordinates: 09°44′31″N 118°45′32″E

Map
- Location within Palawan Location within Philippines

Runways
| Direction | Length | | Surface |
| Direction | m | ft | Surface |
|---|---|---|---|
| 09/27 (Note: Runway 09 is 2,601 meters (8,533 ft) long with a displaced threshold of 218 meters (715 ft).) | 2,601 | 8,533 | Asphalt concrete |

Statistics (2022)
- Passengers: 1,121,373 ▲746.83%
- Aircraft movements: 8,931 ▲53.72%
- Cargo (in kg): 14,139,882 ▲7.67%
- Source: CAAP

Puerto Princesa International Airport (IATA: PPS, ICAO: RPVP) is an airport serving the general area of Puerto Princesa, located in the province of Palawan in the Philippines. It is classified as an international airport by the Civil Aviation Authority of the Philippines.

The airport is the main gateway to the Puerto Princesa Underground River, a UNESCO World Heritage Site and one of the New 7 Wonders of Nature.

== History ==
=== World War II ===
The airport was built by American prisoners of war during the World War II from August 1942 to September 1944. It was used to accommodate large Japanese transport aircraft to complement the grass airstrip south of the present-day location of NCCC Mall Palawan in Lacao Street. The airstrip was constructed by hand by the POWs using crushed corals for illuminating night landings. The finished airfield has an area of 2,195 by 206 meters (7,200 by 675 ft) with two runways.

On December 14, 1944, occupying Japanese soldiers herded 150 remaining American POWs that constructed the airstrip into air raid trenches, doused them with gasoline, set them afire, then machine-gunned and bayoneted them to death. Among them was Army Capt. Fred Bruni, the Palawan POWs’ senior officer, who was from Janesville, Wisconsin with the 192nd Tank Battalion. Only eleven men escaped the Palawan massacre to be rescued by guerrillas. The story of their ordeal persuaded General Douglas MacArthur that the rumored order for the retreating Japanese to "kill all" prisoners was being implemented, thus his rush to liberate the Philippines.

Imperial Japanese Army Air Force units based at this airstrip included the 71st Sentai Squadron (September 1944 – Early 1945).

=== Post-war ===
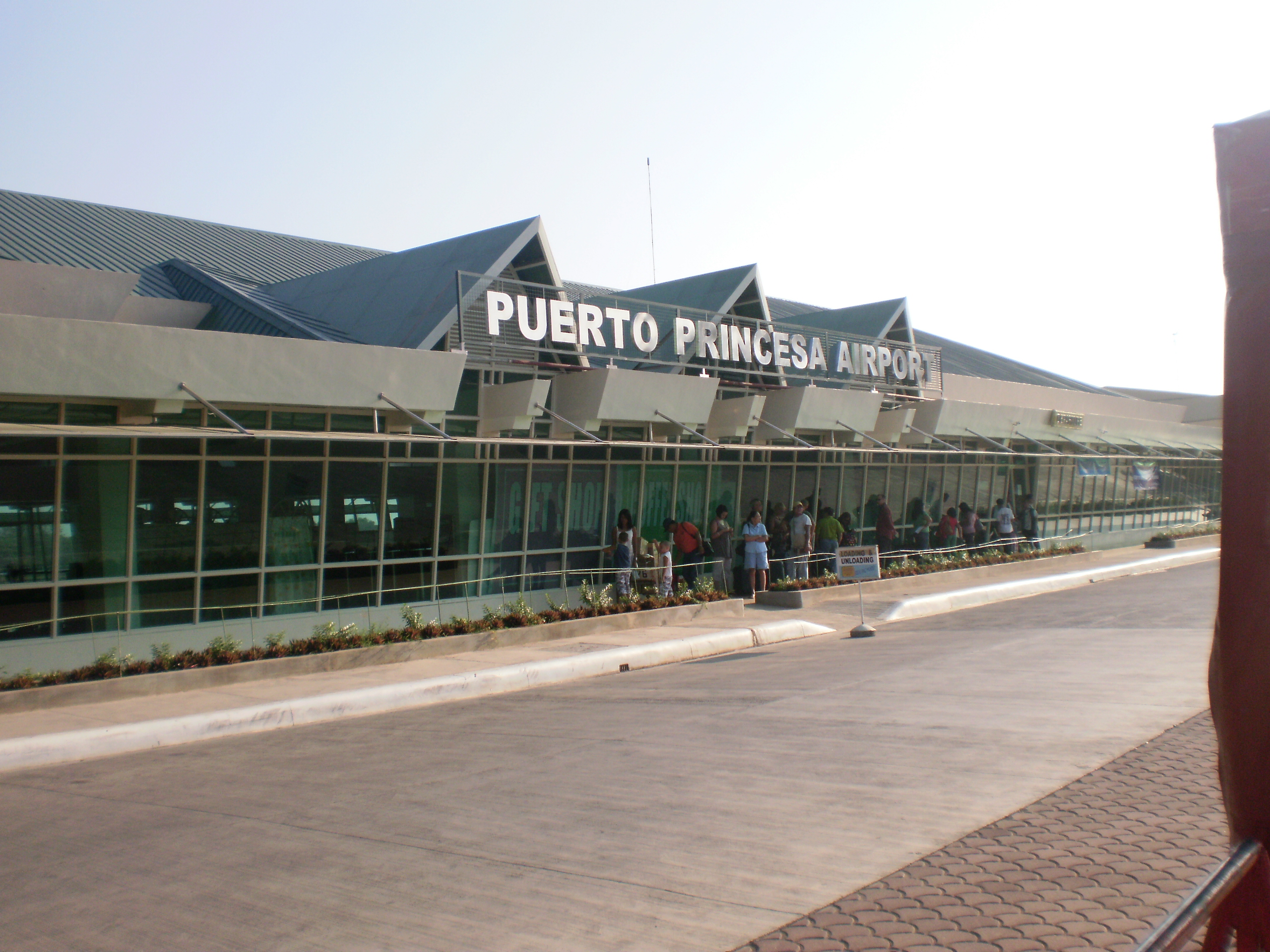
The old terminal located at the other side of the runway which has since been closed to passenger traffic since 2017.

Upon the Liberation of Palawan in early 1945, a number of US Army Air Forces units were stationed at the airport facility. These included the XIII Fighter Command (1 March 1945 – November 1945), 42d Bombardment Group (March 1945 – January 1946), 347th Fighter Group (6 March – December 1945), 419th Night Fighter Squadron (6 March 1945 – 10 January 1946), and the 550th Night Fighter Squadron (DET) (9–19 June 1945).

US Army and Navy Engineers of the 1897th Engineer Aviation Battalion and the 84th Naval Construction Battalion immediately rehabilitated the facility and completed as a military airbase in March 1945. The Army and Navy engineers expanded the airfield, strengthening the runway by laying steel Marston Mats and concrete, adding air control facilities and tanks to store oil and aviation fuel.

Puerto Princesa opened to air travel as early as 1947. The first scheduled route, operated by Philippine Airlines (PAL), was from Manila to Puerto Princesa via San Jose, Mindoro and vice versa. The flight was scheduled during Wednesdays utilizing the DC-3 aircraft. During the early 1960s, Puerto Princesa catered its first direct flight from Manila using the Vickers Viscount aircraft and welcomed its first jet service via BAC 1-11 by the late 1970, both of which are operated by PAL. By the late 1990s, Puerto Princesa Airport welcomed its first wide-body aircraft service with Airbus A300 dubbed as the "Love Bus" operated by PAL.

=== Expansion and contemporary history ===
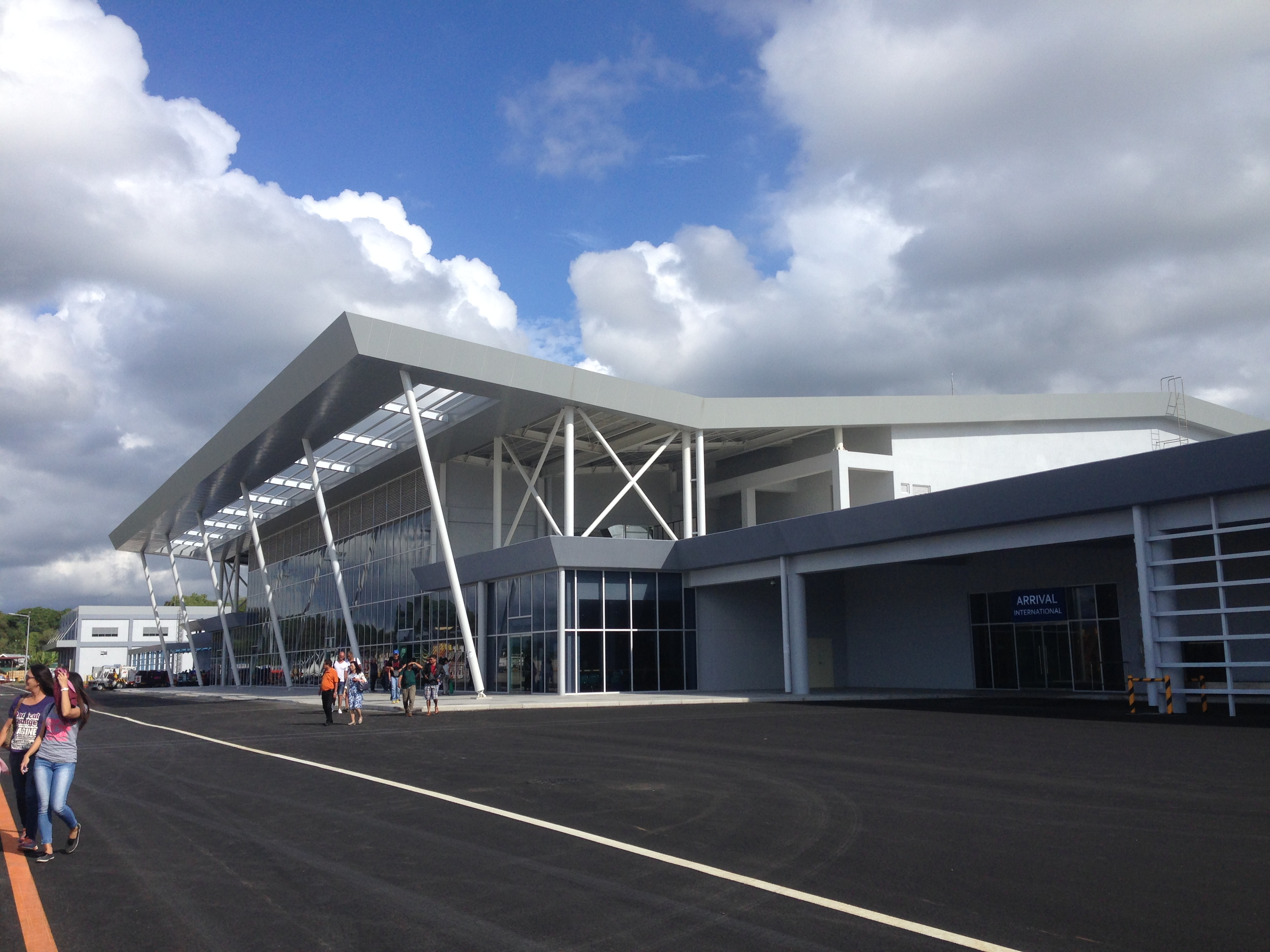
The new terminal as seen from the apron.

To meet the growing air transportation demands of Puerto Princesa and the province of Palawan, in 2014, the Department of Transportation (DOTr) awarded an $82.9-million (₱2.616 billion) contract to the joint venture of Kumho Industrial Co. Ltd. and GS Engineering & Construction for the construction of new passenger terminal and cargo terminal building, a new apron, connecting taxiways, new state-of-the-art air navigation system, and other support facilities in compliance with the international civil aviation standards set by the International Civil Aviation Organization (ICAO). The new terminal was officially inaugurated on May 3, 2017, and opened for commercial operations on the next day.

Between 2013 and 2014, MASwings operated flight routes to Kota Kinabalu, Malaysia. Philippine Airlines operated chartered flights from China, South Korea, and Taiwan in 2018. Meanwhile, Tigerair Taiwan launched commercial international flights to the airport from Taipei on June 7, 2019. Cebu Pacific also launched flights to Hong Kong from the airport on November 17 of that year. In March 2020, international flights were suspended due to the enhanced community quarantine in Luzon caused by the COVID-19 pandemic, along with flights in Manila and Clark.

The largest aircraft accommodated by Puerto Princesa International Airport is a chartered Boeing 777-200ER operated by Omni Air International.

In July 2025, it was announced that the airport will return to operate international flights by the end of the year, which plans to open a new route to South Korea and will be operated by Jeju Air.

Cebu Pacific flew its first Airbus A330neo flight to Puerto Princesa on November 2, 2025, to meet growing travel demand. Similarly, Philippine Airlines launched thrice-weekly-flights to the airport using the 363-seater A330-300 on December 17 to increase passenger and cargo throughput, in time for the peak Christmas travel season.

== Structures ==
=== Terminal ===
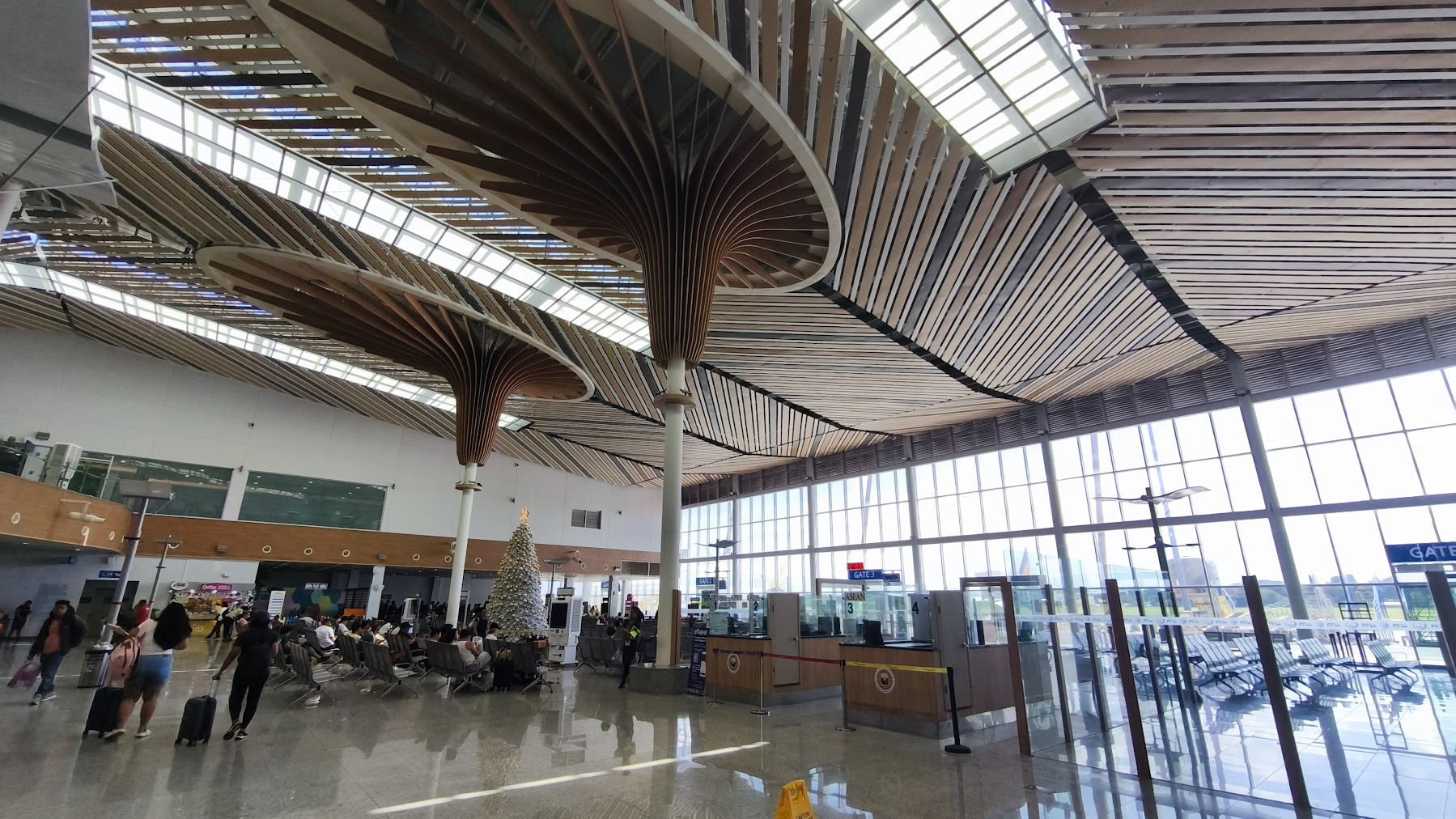
Inside the departure hall.

The airport has a 13,000-square-meter (140,000 sq ft) two-level passenger terminal with a capacity of two million passengers annually and a seating capacity of 1,500. It was built by the joint venture of Kumho Industrial Co. Ltd. and GS Engineering & Construction. Its apron has six aircraft bays designed to accommodate aircraft as large as the Airbus A330, Airbus A350 and Boeing 787. The terminal has a Mabuhay Lounge by Philippine Airlines and a PAGSS Lounge. The terminal also has a seating capacity of 1,500. Outside the terminal is a parking lot with a capacity of 200 cars.

The new terminal replaced the 3,000-square-meter (32,000 sq ft) old passenger terminal with an annual capacity of 350,000 passengers and an apron with four parking bays. In 2019, the terminal was equipped with free WiFi for all travellers.

=== Runway ===
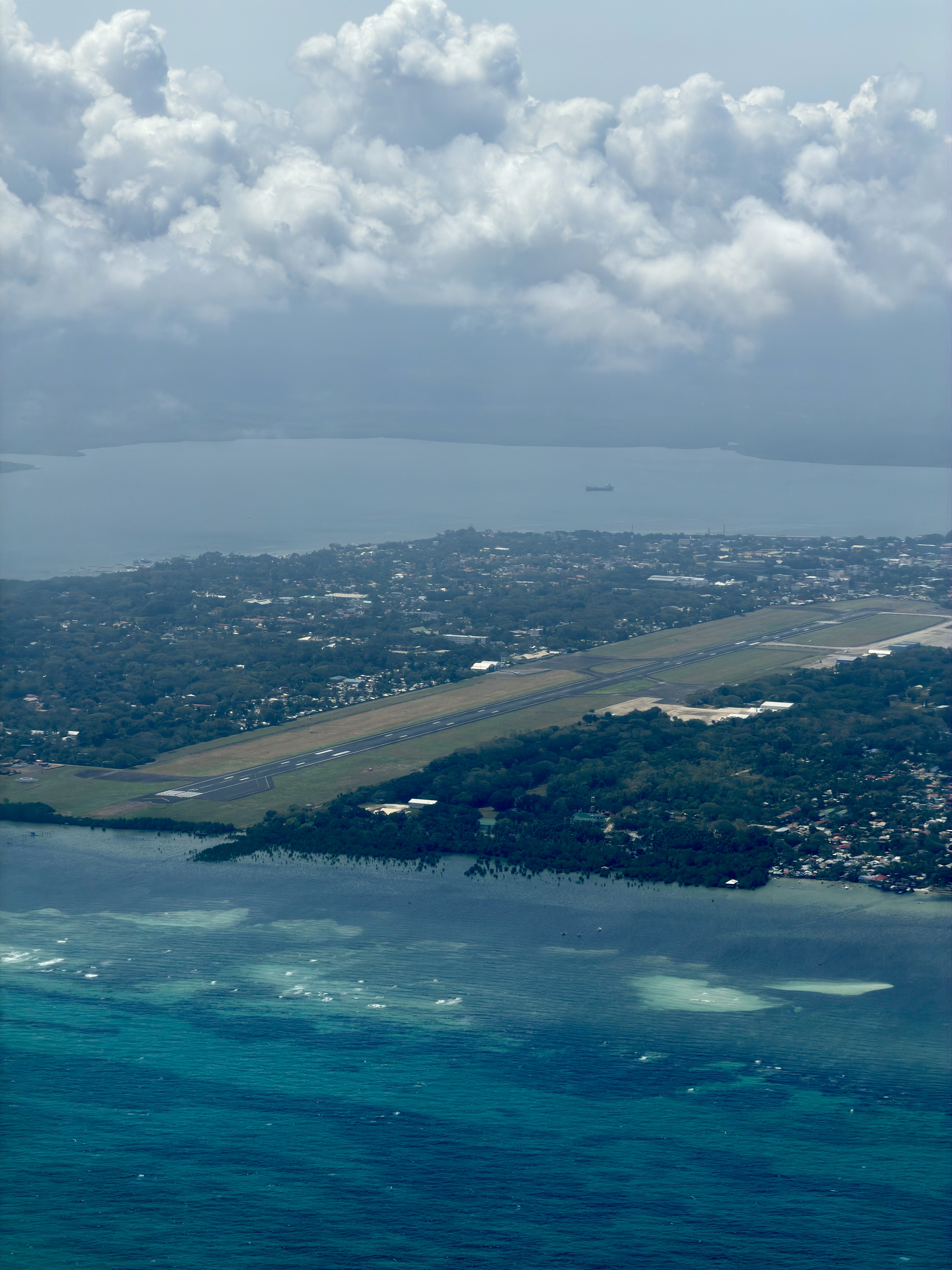
An aerial view of the runway at Puerto Princesa International Airport (PPS) captured from a departing commercial airplane.

The airport consists of a single 2,601-meter-long (8,533 ft) and 45-meter-wide (148 ft) runway running at a direction of 093.1°/273.1°. The airport shares its single runway with Antonio Bautista Air Base. The runway is equipped with an instrument landing system, runway lights, and approach landing lights making the airport capable of nighttime operations and low-visibility landings.

== Airlines and destinations ==
| Airlines | Destinations |
|---|---|
| Cebu Pacific | Cebu, Clark, Davao, Iloilo, Manila |
| PAL Express | Cebu, Manila |

== Statistics ==
Data from Civil Aviation Authority of the Philippines (CAAP).

| Year | Passenger movements | | | | Aircraft movements | | | | Cargo movements (in kg) | | | |
| Year | Domestic | International | Total | % change | Domestic | International | Total | % change | Domestic | International | Total | % change |
|---|---|---|---|---|---|---|---|---|---|---|---|---|
| 2003 | 195,975 | 0 | 195,975 | Steady | 3,346 | 0 | 3,346 | Steady | 5,001,051 | 0 | 5,001,051 | Steady |
| 2004 | 271,769 | 161 | 271,930 | ▲38.76 | 4,390 | 12 | 4,402 | ▲31.56 | 4,500,599 | — | 4,500,599 | ▼10.01 |
| 2005 | 267,778 | 0 | 267,778 | ▼1.53 | 3,916 | 0 | 3,916 | ▼11.04 | 4,744,915 | 0 | 4,744,915 | ▲5.43 |
| 2006 | 284,110 | 0 | 284,110 | ▲6.10 | 3,780 | 0 | 3,780 | ▼3.47 | 3,912,209 | 0 | 3,912,209 | ▼17.55 |
| 2007 | 392,039 | 0 | 392,039 | ▲37.99 | 4,538 | 0 | 4,538 | ▲20.05 | 4,480,615 | 0 | 4,480,615 | ▲14.53 |
| 2008 | 444,878 | 0 | 444,878 | ▲13.48 | 4,990 | 0 | 4,990 | ▲9.96 | 4,580,557 | 0 | 4,580,557 | ▲2.23 |
| 2009 | 584,186 | 0 | 584,186 | ▲31.31 | 4,236 | 0 | 4,236 | ▼15.11 | 5,439,799 | 0 | 5,439,799 | ▲18.76 |
| 2010 | 807,916 | 0 | 807,916 | ▲38.30 | 3,760 | 0 | 3,760 | ▼11.24 | 8,972,631 | 0 | 8,972,631 | ▲64.94 |
| 2011 | 988,972 | 0 | 988,972 | ▲22.41 | 4,248 | 0 | 4,248 | ▲12.98 | 9,294,017 | 0 | 9,294,017 | ▲3.58 |
| 2012 | 1,322,925 | 0 | 1,322,925 | ▲33.77 | 12,046 | 0 | 12,046 | ▲183.57 | 10,938,901 | 0 | 10,938,901 | ▲17.70 |
| 2013 | 1,357,531 | 12,894 | 1,370,425 | ▲3.59 | 10,512 | 2,684 | 13,196 | ▲9.55 | 12,699,299 | — | 12,699,299 | ▲16.09 |
| 2014 | 1,371,651 | 6,929 | 1,378,580 | ▲0.60 | 13,130 | 224 | 13,354 | ▲1.20 | 15,038,825 | — | 15,038,825 | ▲18.42 |
| 2015 | 1,564,914 | 26,804 | 1,591,718 | ▲15.46 | 14,222 | 184 | 14,406 | ▲7.88 | 14,278,467 | 133,614 | 14,412,081 | ▼4.17 |
| 2016 | 1,612,640 | 31,363 | 1,644,003 | ▲3.28 | 13,813 | 191 | 14,004 | ▼2.79 | 17,136,857 | 116,870 | 17,253,727 | ▲19.72 |
| 2017 | 1,767,157 | 22,958 | 1,790,115 | ▲8.89 | 15,682 | 155 | 15,837 | ▲13.09 | 16,173,990 | 833,190 | 17,007,180 | ▼1.43 |
| 2018 | 2,046,628 | 99,722 | 2,146,350 | ▲19.90 | 19,404 | 683 | 20,087 | ▲26.84 | 16,955,042 | 13,029 | 16,968,071 | ▼0.23 |
| 2019 | 2,019,542 | 144,189 | 2,163,731 | ▲0.81 | 17,423 | 1,033 | 18,456 | ▼8.12 | 20,042,720 | — | 20,042,720 | ▲18.12 |
| 2020 | 453,610 | 21,712 | 475,322 | ▼78.03 | 6,375 | 194 | 6,569 | ▼64.41 | 9,730,214 | — | 9,730,214 | ▼51.4 |
| 2021 | 132,420 | — | 132,420 | ▼72.14 | 5,801 | 9 | 5,810 | ▼11.55 | 13,132,851 | — | 13,132,851 | ▲34.97 |
| 2022 | 1,121,047 | 326 | 1,121,373 | ▲746.83 | 8,923 | 9 | 8,931 | ▲53.72 | 14,139,882 | — | 14,139,882 | ▲7.67 |

An em dash (—) is used when data from CAAP is not available.

== Accidents and incidents ==
- On January 11, 2011, Cebu Pacific Flight 645, an Airbus A319 from Manila with 129 passengers and 6 crews on board, swerved off the runway upon landing after touchdown. Though the pilot maneuvered the aircraft back to the runway, the aircraft sustained substantial damage on its nose and main landing gear with other damages on the left and right engine fan blades, aircraft underbelly and underwings. No one on board was injured.
- On April 11, 2012, a Cebu Pacific Airbus A320 (as Flight 640 departing for Manila) clipped the wingtip of a Zest Airways Airbus A320 while sitting on the apron around 6:30 p.m. The incident severed Zest Airways' navigation lights forcing the airline to cancel their return flight to Manila.
- On September 12, 2025, an NC-212i light transport aircraft of the Philippine Air Force with tail number 2120 carrying 11 people from Cebu had its two main tires burst during landing at the airport, forcing its pilots to stop the aircraft in the middle of the runway. No injuries were recorded.

== See also ==
- List of airports in the Philippines
- Antonio Bautista Air Base
