= Enhanced Defense Cooperation Agreement =

2014 Philippines-United States agreement

Agreement Between the Republic of the Philippines and The Government of the United States on Enhanced Defense Cooperation
- Signed: April 28, 2014
- Location: Manila, Philippines
- Parties: Philippines; United States
- Language: English

The Enhanced Defense Cooperation Agreement (EDCA) is a 2014 agreement between the United States and the Philippines intended to bolster the American–Philippine alliance. The agreement allows the United States to rotate troops into the Philippines for extended stays and allows the United States to build and operate facilities on Philippine bases for both American and Philippine forces. The U.S. is not allowed to establish any permanent military bases. The Philippines have personnel access to American ships and planes. This agreement has been the subject of criticism by some leftist groups in the Philippines.

The EDCA was agreed in furtherance of the mutual defense treaty and within the context of the visiting forces agreement long in effect between the countries. The agreement was signed by Philippine Defense Secretary Voltaire Gazmin and US Ambassador to the Philippines Philip Goldberg in Manila on April 28, 2014, preceding a visit by US President Barack Obama with Philippine President Noynoy Aquino that same day. On January 12, 2016, the Philippine Supreme Court upheld the agreement's constitutionality in a 10–4 vote. On July 26, 2016, the Philippine Supreme Court ruled with finality that the agreement is constitutional.

Evan S. Medeiros, a former U.S. National Security Council's senior director for Asian affairs was quoted in The Washington Post as saying, "This is the most significant defense agreement that we have concluded with the Philippines in decades."

== Background ==
For more than a century, the Philippines has been important to American defense strategy. Currently, the Philippines is a "major non-NATO ally" of the United States.

The US acquired the Philippines from Spain after the Spanish–American War of 1898 and then fought the Philippine–American War of 1899–1902 against Philippine revolutionaries to secure their rule. After both wars, the Philippines was a territory of the United States from 1898 to 1946. The United States granted the Philippines independence in 1946.

The Mutual Defense Treaty was signed in 1951 and ratified in 1952 by the governments of the United States and the Philippines. The purpose of the Treaty was to "strengthen the fabric of peace" in the Pacific, by formally adopting an agreement to defend each other's territory in the case of external attack. In line with this treaty, the United States maintained several military bases in the Philippines, including Subic Bay Naval Base and the Clark Air Base. In 1992, the bases closed after the Philippine Senate rejected, by a close vote, a treaty that would have extended the bases' lease. The treaty was rejected because of US reluctance to set a firm time frame for troop withdrawal and to guarantee that no nuclear weapons would pass through the base.

The Philippines–United States Visiting Forces Agreement (VFA) was signed by the governments of the Philippines and the United States in 1998, and came into effect in 1999. This was the first military agreement since the closing of US bases in 1992. The VFA outlined a set of guidelines for the conduct and protection of American troops visiting the Philippines. The Agreement also stipulated the terms and conditions for American military to pass through or land in Philippine territory. The VFA is a reciprocal agreement in that not only does it outline the guidelines for US troops visiting the Philippines but also for Philippine troops visiting the United States.

The signing of the VFA led to the establishment of annual bilateral military exercises between the US and the Philippine known as Balikatan, as well as a variety of other cooperative measures. The Balikatan training exercises ("shoulder-to-shoulder") are annual military exercises between the U.S. and the Philippines. They are structured to maintain and develop the security relationship between the two countries' armed forces through crisis-action planning, enhanced training to conduct counterterrorism operations, and promoting interoperability of the forces.

Over the years the exercises have expanded to include other surrounding countries in Southeast Asia. These training exercises have also had a shifting focus. During the U.S.-led "war on terror" the annual Balikatan Exercises focused on training for counterterrorism missions. In 2012, the seal of the United States Embassy in Manila was defaced by student activists to protest the exercises.

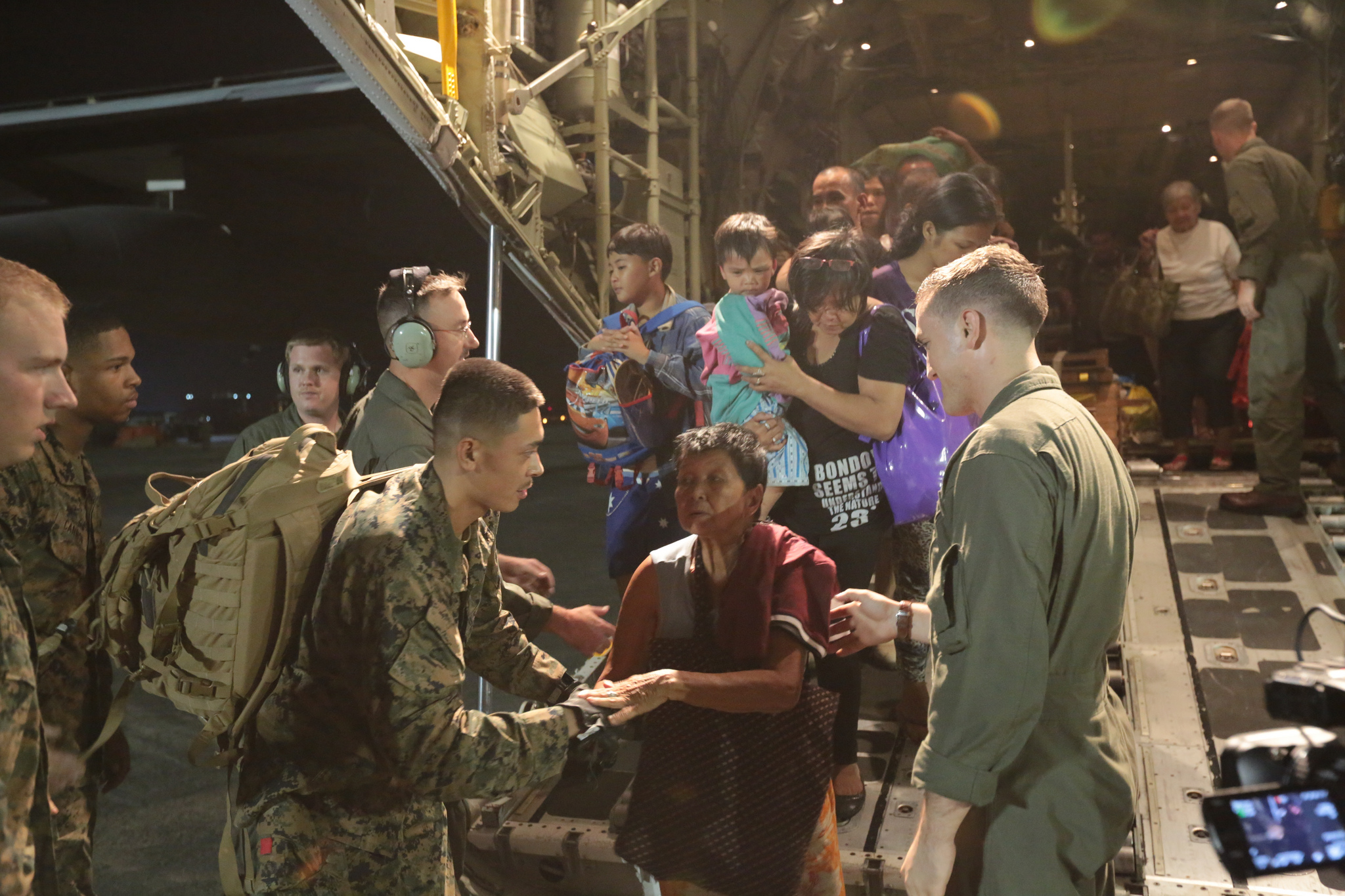
U.S. Marines assist in Typhoon Haiyan relief efforts, November 2013

Disaster relief and crisis response have since become important focuses for the U.S.–Philippine security relationship and a key impetus of the EDCA agreement. The United States Marines were among the first to arrive in the Philippines after Typhoon Haiyan hit the Philippines on November 8, 2013. At the immediate request of the Philippine government, US and international relief agencies arrived three days after the storm to provide aid and assistance to the thousands of injured and homeless. The United States government provided over $37 million in aid.

== Summary of the agreement ==
According to Ambassador Goldberg, the goal of the EDCA is to "promote peace and security in the region." While outlining new defense-cooperation measures, the agreement also allows for the United States to respond more quickly to environmental and humanitarian disasters in the region.

Designed to supplement the 1951 Mutual Defense Treaty and the 1999 Visiting Forces Agreement, the EDCA reaffirms mutual cooperation between the United States and the Philippines to develop their individual and collective capacities to resist armed attack by: improving interoperability of the two country's armed forces, promoting long-term modernization, helping maintain and develop maritime security, and expanding humanitarian assistance in response to natural disasters. It is to be noted however that as per the Preamble, Subparagraph 5 of the EDCA Agreement, that the "Parties share an understanding for the United States not to establish a permanent military presence or base in the territory of the Philippines."

The agreement allows for US forces and contractors to operate out of "agreed locations" (see Agreed Locations section below). Although no specific locations are given in the main body of the initial Agreement, they are defined as: "facilities and areas that are provided by the Government of the Philippines through the Armed Forces of the Philippines (AFP) and that United States forces, United States contractors, and others as mutually agreed, shall have the right to access and use pursuant to this Agreement". The Agreement "codifies the conditions of limited military cooperation between the Philippines and the United States." Article 3, Section 1 says that the Philippines authorizes the United States may conduct the following activities with respect to Agreed Locations: "training; transit; support and related activities; refueling of aircraft; bunkering of vessels; temporary maintenance of vehicles, vessels, and aircraft; temporary accommodation of personnel; communications; prepositioning of equipment, supplies, and materiel; deploying forces and materiel; and such other activities as the Parties may agree.". The Agreement makes clear that this materiel cannot include nuclear weapons.

The EDCA is effective for an initial period of ten years, and thereafter, it shall continue in force automatically unless terminated by either Party by giving one year's written notice through diplomatic channels of its intention to terminate the agreement (Article XII, Sec. 4 of EDCA). While the US forces may exercise operational control, put troops and equipment, construct facilities, and be accommodated in certain agreed locations, the Philippines shall still retain ownership of the agreed locations (Article V, Sec. 1 of EDCA). Importantly, the United States is not allowed to establish any permanent military bases, and must hand over any and all facilities in the "agreed locations" to the Philippine government upon the termination of the agreement.

The agreement also stipulates that the US is not allowed to store or position any nuclear weapons on Philippine territory.

== Implementation ==
Original EDCA bases: 1 = Antonio Bautista Air Base (Palawan), 2 = Cesar Basa Air Base (Pampanga), 3 = Benito Ebuen Air Base (Cebu), 4 = Fort Magsaysay (Nueva Ecija), 5 = Lumbia Airport (Cagayan de Oro)
Bases added in 2023: 6 = Naval Station Narciso del Rosario (Balabac Island, Palawan), 7 = Camp Melchor F. dela Cruz (Gamu, Isabela), 8 = Lal-lo Airport (Lal-lo, Cagayan), 9 = Naval Base Camilo Osias (Santa Ana, Cagayan)

In April 2015, the United States government asked for access to eight bases in the Philippines, including the formerly American Subic Bay Naval Base, and Clark Air Base, as well as locations in Luzon, Cebu, and Palawan.

On March 19, 2016, the Philippines and the United States government agreed on five locations of military bases for the American troops under the EDCA:

- Antonio Bautista Air Base (Palawan)
- Basa Air Base (Pampanga)
- Benito Ebuen Air Base (Cebu)
- Fort Magsaysay (Nueva Ecija)
- Lumbia Airport (Cagayan de Oro)

The implementation of EDCA faced delays during the term of president Rodrigo Duterte, who repeatedly expressed his disdain for the United States. However, on January 30, 2019, the United States and the Philippines officially activated the first major project under EDCA. Defense Secretary Delfin Lorenzana and US Ambassador Sung Kim led the ribbon-cutting ceremony of a human assistance and disaster relief warehouse at Basa Air Base in the province of Pampanga.

In November 2022, the Department of National Defense released a statement saying, "The Department is committed to accelerate the implementation of the Edca by concluding infrastructure enhancement and repair projects, developing new infrastructure projects at existing Edca locations, and exploring new locations that will build a more credible mutual defense posture". This will allow US troops to stay in the country for an extended period. Five additional locations were being considered, one each in the provinces of Palawan, Zambales, and Isabela, and two in the province of Cagayan.

Upon the election of president Bongbong Marcos, the Philippines gravitated towards the United States and Philippine-China relations deteriorated. The United States requested access to four additional locations of Philippine military bases under the EDCA, to which Marcos approved. On April 3, 2023, the locations of the four new EDCA sites—three in north Luzon facing Taiwan, and one in Palawan facing the South China Sea—were announced:

- Balabac Island (Palawan)
- Camp Melchor Dela Cruz (Gamu, Isabela)
- Lal-lo Airport (Lal-lo, Cagayan)
- Naval Base Camilo Osias (Santa Ana, Cagayan)

The governors of Isabela and Cagayan, which together host three of the bases, expressed dismay at the agreement, stating they had not been consulted on the sites and did not want their provinces to pay too much for the infrastructure improvements or become potential targets of Chinese nuclear attack. Former President Duterte expressed doubts that "America will die for us [Filipinos]"; he added Americans "have so many ships, so you [they] do not need my island as a launching pad".

== See also ==
- Mutual Defense Treaty (United States–Philippines)
