= Mactan–Benito Ebuen Air Base =

Military airport in Central Visayas, Philippines

Brigadier General Benito N. Ebuen Air Base
- Part of the Philippine Air Force (PAF)
- located at Mactan, Cebu, Philippines
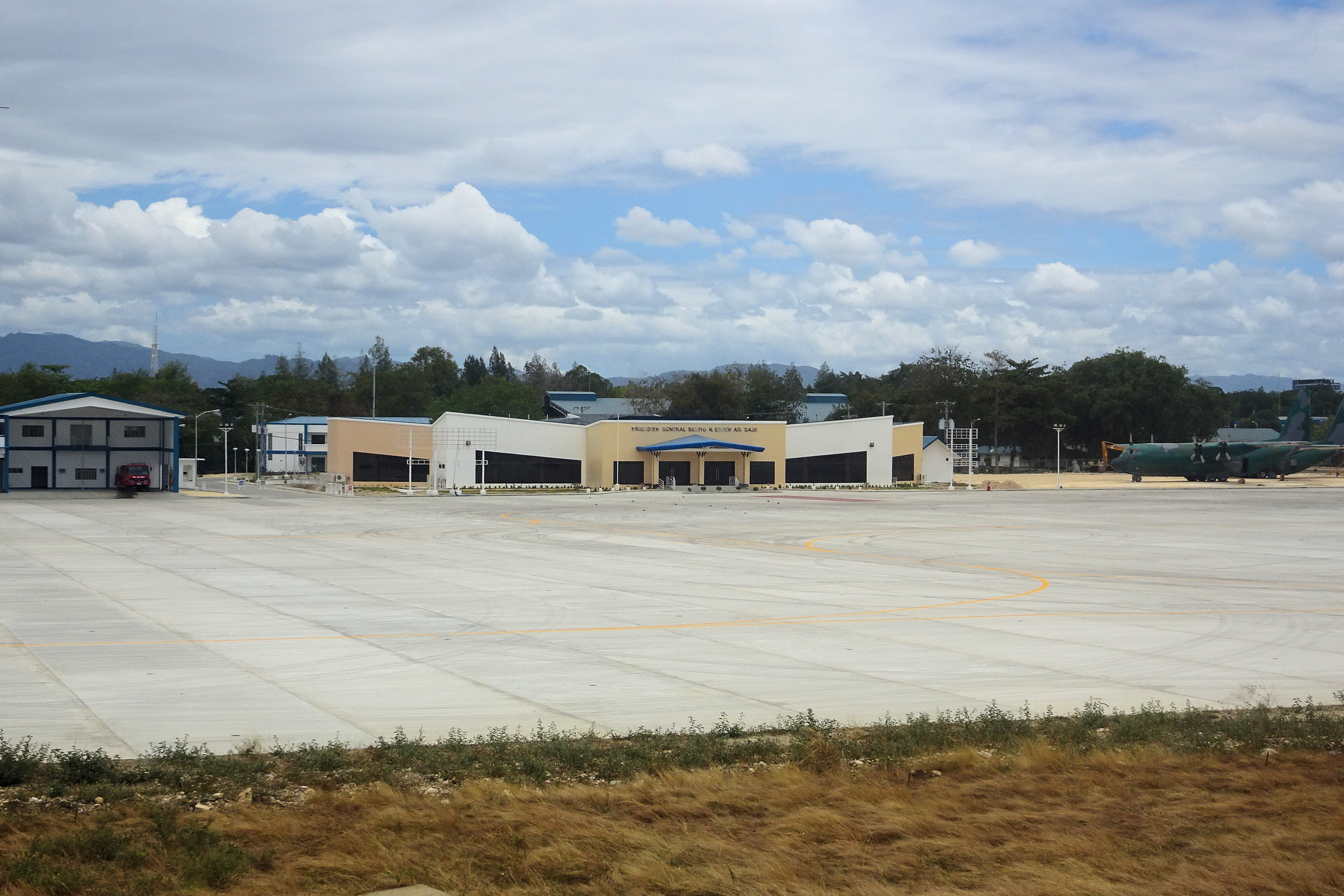
- Brigadier General Benito N. Ebuen Air Base, with the flightline in the foreground

Site information
- Type: PAF military airbase
- Owner: Philippines
- Operator: Philippine Air Force previously: United States Air Force (under jurisdiction of Enhanced Defense Cooperation Agreement)
- Condition: active, as of 2022

Location
- Coordinates: 10°18′26″N 123°58′44″E

Site history
- Built: 1956; 70 years ago
- Built by: United States
- In use: 1 September 1961–present

Garrison information
- Garrison: 205th Tactical Operations Wing; 220th Airlift Wing; 505th Search and Rescue Group; 560th Air Base Wing
- Occupants: 208th Tactical Helicopter Squadron; 5052nd Search and Rescue Squadron; 1304th Dental Dispensary

Mactan–Benito Ebuen Air Base
- IATA: CEB; ICAO: RPVM

Summary
- Airport type: Military / public
- Owner: Philippine National Government
- Operator: Philippine Air Force
- Location: Mactan, Cebu, Philippines
- Opened: 1 September 1961; 64 years ago
- Built: 1956; 70 years ago
- Time zone: Philippine Standard Time (UTC+8)
- Elevation AMSL: 23 m (75 ft)
- Coordinates: 10°18′48″N 123°58′58″E

Map
- Location within Metro Cebu Location within Philippines

Runways
Direction	Length		Surface
Direction	m	ft	Surface
04L/22R	2,560	8,400	Concrete
04R/22L	3,300	10,827	Asphalt

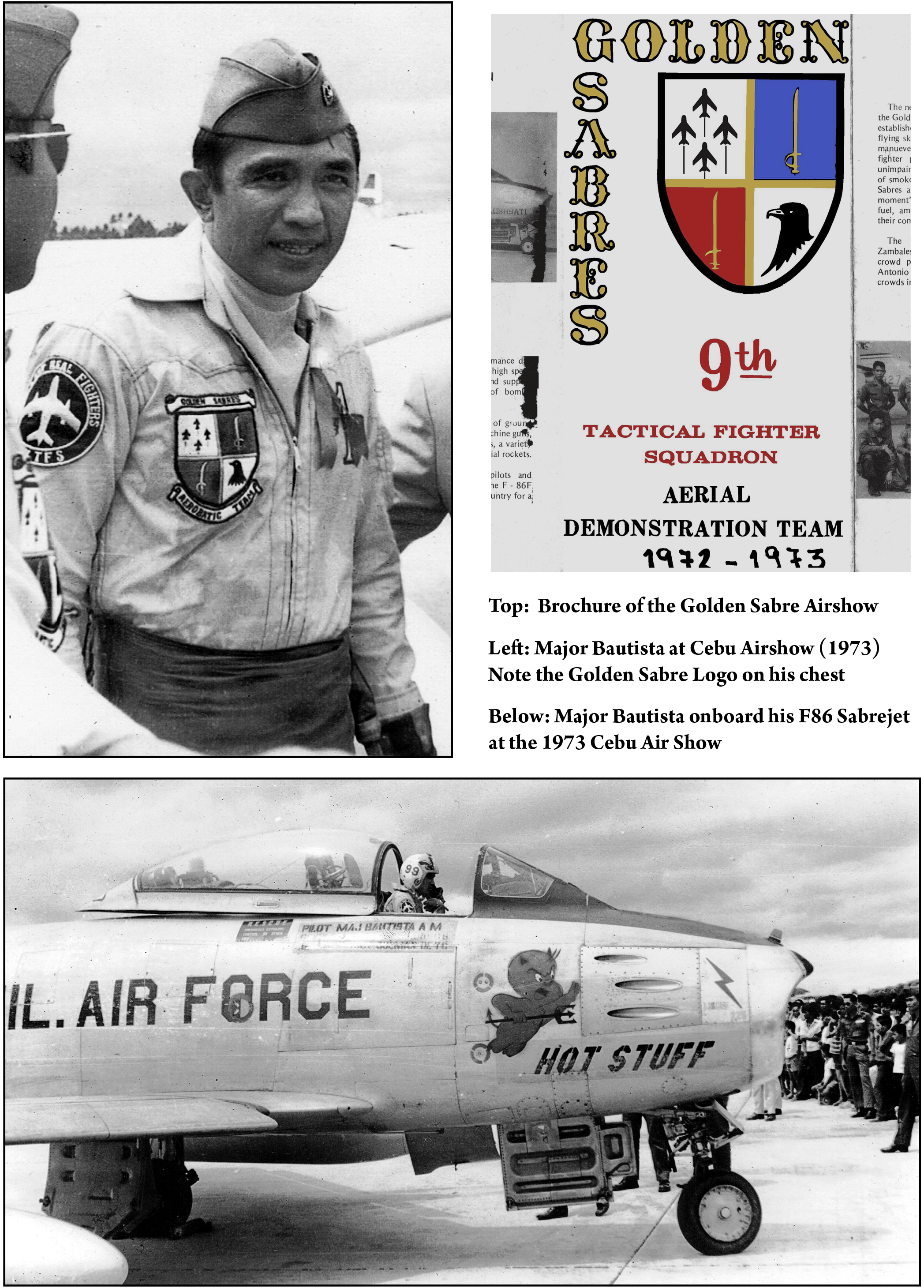
Montage of Maj Bautista, lead pilot of the F-86 Golden Sabres display team of the 9th Tactical Fighter Squadron, at the 1973 Cebu airshow.

Mactan–Benito Ebuen Air Base, originally known as Opon Airfield and later Mactan Air Base, (IATA: CEB, ICAO: RPVM) is an active military airbase of the Philippine Air Force (PAF). It is located on the island of Mactan, Cebu, in the Visayas region of the Philippines. It shares its two runways with the civilian Mactan–Cebu International Airport. Mactan Air Base was originally built by, and was a facility of the United States Air Force (USAF), until the American military units left the country in 1991, whereby full and total control was handed over to the Philippine Air Force.

== Location ==
Mactan–Benito Ebuen Air Base is located on Mactan island, in Lapu-Lapu City, in the province of Cebu in the Central Visayas region of the Philippines. Mactan island is best known as being the location where the Spanish explorer, Ferdinand Magellan was killed by the forces of Lapulapu during his circumnavigation of the earth.

== History ==
In 1945, Seabee unit Acorn 51 was assigned as the development unit for an airfield at Cebu. The Seabees of the 54th Naval Construction Battalion were tasked with constructing the runway and support facilities. After World War II, the American Strategic Air Command (SAC) were allocated Mactan as an emergency landing field in the event of a war. The airfield was basically barren, with only a few permanent structures and a 10,000 feet (3,000 metres) concrete runway. By 1965, the only permanent structures at the airfield were a Philippine Air Force (PAF) operations building; which also doubled as an airport terminal, and the PAF barracks. There was also a squadron of PAF F-86s on base.

As the Vietnam War escalated, the base was rapidly built up. At its height, it became a permanent C-130 base, housing at least the 772nd and 774th Troop Carrier Squadrons of the 463rd Troop Carrier Wing (later renamed as 'Tactical Airlift' Squadrons and Wing), as well as becoming a crew rest stop for C-124 and C-133 crews, in order to relieve congestion at Clark Air Base. The C-124 Operations Squadron was the 606th Military Airlift Support Squadron (606th MASS).

After the end of the Vietnam War, the base was handed over to the Philippine Air Force.

During the Mindanao campaign in the 1970s, Mactan Air Base the base was extensively used for fighter operations against targets in Mindanao region by the Philippine Air Force.

In June 1996, Mactan Air Base was renamed Brigadier General Benito N. Ebuen Air Base in honour of Philippine Air Force General Benito N. Ebuen, a former PAF chief, who was killed in an aviation accident along with then Philippine president Ramon Magsaysay in 1957.

In the aftermath of Super Typhoon Yolanda, Cebu airport was designated the hub of logistics for rescue and relief efforts, and the base saw a continuous flow of helicopters and jumbo cargo aircraft. Each day, at least ten were parked in the base, including V-22 Ospreys of the US Marines, to C-130 transport aircraft of different air forces of countries extending aid. Bigger aircraft like the C-5 Galaxy, C-17 Globemaster, 747 freighters, and An-124 landed in the base.

== Current status ==
This Philippine Air Force (PAF) airbase is currently responsible for the Transport Wing, and provides for PAF operations in the Visayas area.

Stationed at the base in 2009 were the 208th Tactical Helicopter Squadron, 205th Tactical Operations Wing, and the 220th Airlift Wing, along with the 5052nd Search and Rescue Squadron of the 505th Search and Rescue Group, and the 1304th Dental Dispensary. The Headquarters Administrative Squadron from the 205th Tactical Operations Wing, and the 560th Air Base Wing handle logistics. At present, PAF Units occupying Brigadier General Benito N Ebuen Air Base are the Headquarters Air Mobility Command, 220th Airlift Wing, 205th Tactical Helicopter Wing Tactical Operations Wing Central and 560th Air Base Group presently act as facilitator of the Base.
