= Camp Melchor F. dela Cruz =

Philippine military camp in Gamu, Isabela

- Gamu, Isabela
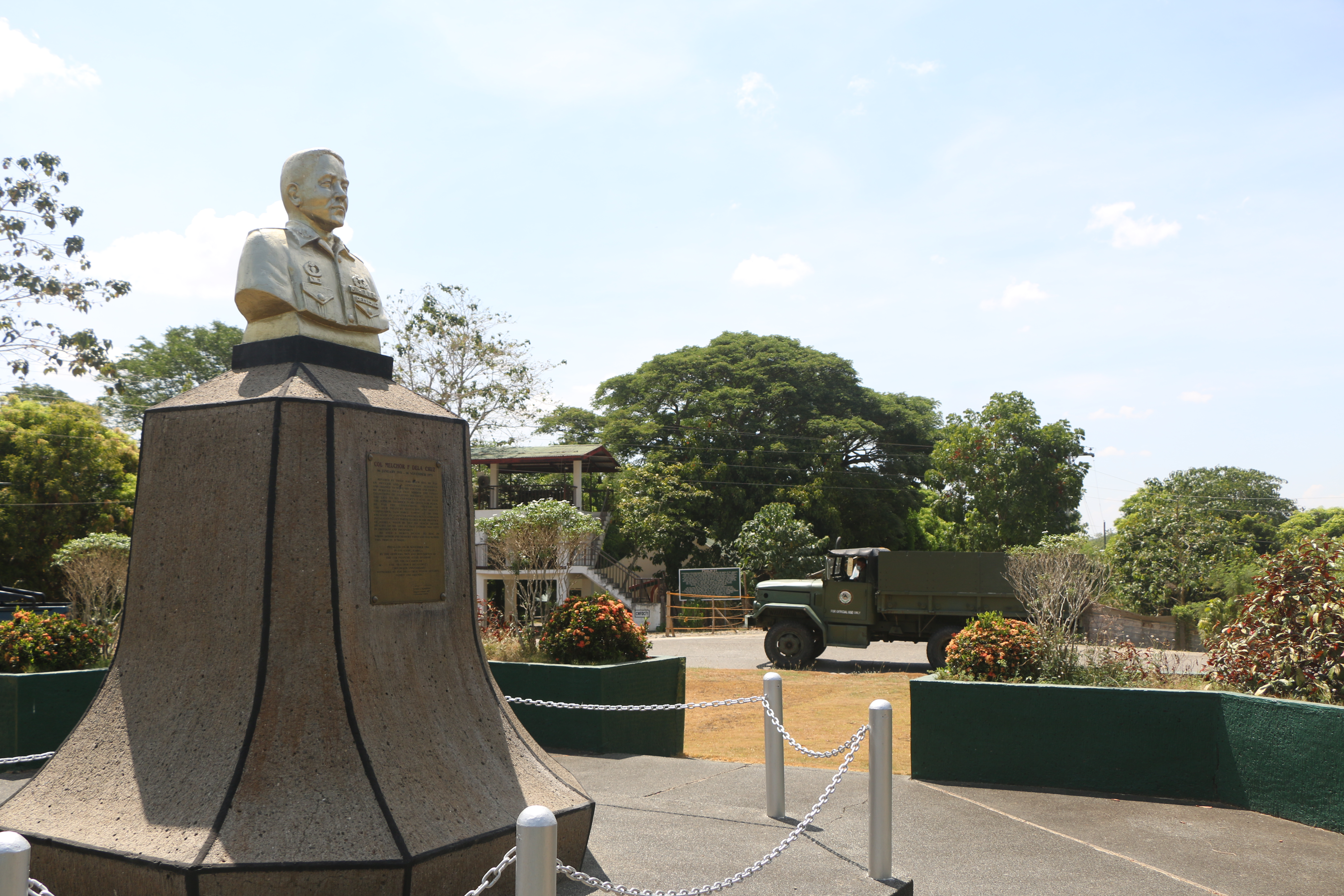
- Bust of Col. Melchor F. dela Cruz within the camp

Site information
- Type: Military base
- Controlled by: Philippines

Location
- Location within Luzon Location within Philippines
- Coordinates: 17°04′20″N 121°51′54″E

Site history
- Built: 1936

Camp Melchor F. dela Cruz is a military camp used by the Armed Forces of the Philippines in barangay Upi in Gamu, Isabela.

== History ==
Established in 1936, it was renamed in honor of Colonel Melchor dela Cruz, who was killed after his helicopter was shot down by the communist New People's Army over San Mariano, Isabela during reconnaissance operations against the rebel group on 8 November 1971. It is currently the headquarters of the 5th Infantry Division of the Philippine Army.

On May 23, 2011, the camp's re-enlistment office was damaged by two explosions, which authorities believed were perpetrated by rejected applicants for the army.

In 2023, the camp was selected as one of four strategic military bases in the Philippines that were opened to the US military as part of the Enhanced Defense Cooperation Agreement, citing the base's proximity to Taiwan.

On October 10, 2024, three people were killed in a mass shooting perpetrated by a soldier inside the camp that was believed to have been part of a domestic dispute.

== Facilities ==
The camp also houses a museum dedicated to the life of dela Cruz and exhibits relating to the 5th ID. It also hosts the 5ID Memorial Pylon dedicated to the unit's soldiers who died in the course of duty in Northern Luzon.

== Future expansion ==
Following the opening of the facility to US forces under the EDCA agreement in 2023, the United States has pledged to build warehouses to store US military assets, a landing pad for rotary aircraft, a joint training facility and a command fusion centre.
