= 2002 Davao City Evergreen Hotel explosion =

2002 hotel explosion in Davao City

Evergreen Hotel explosion
- Entrance to the Evergreen Hotel, Davao City.

- Davao City (Mindanao mainland)
- Date: May 16, 2002
- Location: Evergreen Hotel, Ramon Magsaysay Avenue, Poblacion District, Davao City, Philippines; 7°04′27″N 125°37′26″E
- Cause: Improvised Explosive Device detonation
- Injuries: 1
- Property damage: PHP 2 million
- Suspects: Michael Meiring

The Evergreen Hotel explosion took place on May 16, 2002, in Davao City, Philippines. 67-year-old hotel guest Michael Meiring was severely injured and had to have one of his legs amputated. Although Meiring initially claimed an assailant had thrown a grenade, the blast was determined to have been caused by explosives Meiring was storing inside his room at the hotel. Despite facing criminal charges, a few days later Meiring was spirited out of the country by individuals claiming to be American federal agents. The mysterious circumstances of the explosion and Meiring dramatic escape has fueled conspiracy theories that he was involved in a covert "false flag" operation.

== Background ==
Born in 1935, Meiring was a former citizen of South Africa who moved to the United States of America towards the end of the Apartheid regime in the early 1990s, eventually settling in Calimesa, California. He reportedly practiced medicine for the South African police and was affiliated with the African National Congress.

Meiring allegedly came to the Philippines to work as a treasure hunter, and secured permits from the Fidel Ramos administration to hunt for Yamashita's gold in sunken American and Japanese ships. Meiring set up a company named 'Parousia International Trading', which listed the phone and fax numbers of the Evergreen hotel on Ramon Magsaysay Avenue in Davao City on its business records. Meiring had been a frequent visitor at the hotel for over 10 years, and would often stay in the Mindanao region for 6 months at a time.

David Hawthorn, a close friend of Meiring, claimed that his friend confessed to giving a box of US currency to the South African government. The box was one of 12, each estimated to contain $500 million. Meiring later partnered with a Manila-based group that had links to James Rowe. According to American intelligence analyst Dan Crawford, Rowe was linked to a Nevada white supremacist and tax revolt group that had connection the Neo-Nazi Party in the United States and the Fifth Reich group of Germany. Meiring's American friends suspected that the Manila group conspired against him.

== Evergreen Hotel explosion ==
On December 14, 2001, Meiring checked into Room 305 at the Evergreen Hotel in the Poblacion District of downtown Davao City. Meiring was observed to carry two padlocked metal boxes up to his room, and he warned hotel staff not to touch them or to use any chemicals while cleaning his room. On May 16, 2002, an explosion occurred inside Meiring's hotel room, causing extensive injuries to his lower legs. Meiring told first responders that a man had thrown a grenade into his room. Although the origin of the blast was initially suspected to have been due to an accidental detonation of dynamite, authorities subsequently determined that an improvised explosive device using a primary explosive charge consisting of ammonium nitrate was the most likely cause. Meiring was thereafter rushed to the Davao Doctors Hospital after he sustained third-degree burns, and had his left leg amputated due to his injuries.

On May 19, 2002, agents from the US Federal Bureau of Investigation (FBI) reportedly forcibly removed Meiring from Davao Doctors Hospital and then flew him to Manila on a Learjet chartered from Subic Air, allegedly arranged by the US Embassy in Manila. Davao City police chief Conrado Laza would later comment that they were powerless to prevent his removal, as since no criminal charges had yet been filed there was no legal basis to hold him. By May 22, Meiring was confined at the Makati Medical Center. Meiring's insurance did not cover the American's bills at the Davao Medical Center, and Makati Medical Center was one of only two hospitals accredited by Miering's medical insurance, which was the reported reason for his transfer. Around the same time, authorities in Davao City filed criminal charges of illegal possession of explosives and reckless damage to property against Meiring, issuing a warrant for his arrest and an immigration hold departure order to prevent him from leaving the country. The Evergreen Hotel also filed a PHP 2 million civil against Meiring to pay for the repair of his hotel room. On May 28, it was reported that Meiring was on life-support at Makati Medical Center, which would prevent him returning to Davao City in the immediate future.Meiring was eventually transported to America and checked into the Arrowhead Medical Research Center in Colton, California, to undergo treatment for severe burns.

== Aftermath ==
Michael Meiring wanted poster, issued by the Philippine Police

Crime scene investigators discovered an ID card from the Moro National Liberation Front, with Meiring's details on it, inside the other metal box in the hotel room. It was also revealed that Meiring had been monitored by local police in the run up to the explosion, who were suspicious of the frequent moving of boxes to and from the Evergreen Hotel, and that he had recently been caught in possession of counterfeit US dollars at Toril fish market. Subsequent efforts to extradite Meiring back to the Philippines to face trial were unsuccessful, due to the legal technicality of the Davao City Prosecutor being unable to produce mugshot photographs of Meiring (as he was never formally arrested after the explosion).

In May 2002, the Federal Bureau of Investigation released a statement denying any involvement in Meiring's escape, asserting that although FBI explosives experts had visited the crime scene it was only to investigate a possible terrorist attack against an American citizen, and that the agents returned to Manila on the same day. In a March 2005 interview, American Ambassador to the Philippines Francis J. Ricciardone Jr. claimed that Meiring was moved to a hospital in Manila on the advice of local doctors. Ricciardone also asserted that when Meiring was repatriated to the United States nine days later, the Philippine authorities had not informed the US Embassy that Meiring had any pending criminal charges and that he was not halted by the Bureau of Immigration either while exiting the country. The US Embassy itself also released a press statement regarding Meiring's repatriation, stating that doctors in Manila had recommended his transfer to a specialist burn center in America, and that embassy officials had simply provided routine consular services to a US citizen undergoing a medical evacuation.

In May 2016, President-elect Rodrigo Duterte attributed the event to causing his "hatred" towards the United States. Duterte condemned the United States government for assisting the criminal Meiring in leaving the country, disregarding the Philippine legal process. He called the alleged act disrespectful of Philippine sovereignty. Duterte says that he received no apology from the United States. Duterte was Mayor of Davao City at the time of the incident. At that time, Duterte said Meiring was responsible for the incident, and that he refused to cooperate with the police when they searched his room before the explosion.

== Allegations of CIA involvement ==
In addition to Meiring's dramatic escape aided by US government officials, the fact that a number of bomb alerts had occurred locally in the days leading up to the explosion, along with a fatal blast in General Santos City the previous month by an unknown group that killed 15 people and injured 55 others after a series of anonymous warnings via text messages, gave rise to conspiracy theories that Meiring was responsible for a false flag operation designed to induce the Philippine government to grant American authorities greater influence locally in regards to the war on terror. Military officers involved in the July 2003 Oakwood mutiny also alleged that the Davao City airport bombing, along with the Sasa ferry terminal bombing at the Port of Davao, were false flag operations involving US intelligence agencies.

Articles in the BusinessWorld newspaper specifically accused Meiring of being a Central Intelligence Agency agent involved in covert operations in Southeast Asia, who staged terrorist atrocities to destabilize the Mindanao region with the intent to justify increased military operations against the MILF, and thus incentivize an increased US military presence in the Philippines. A similar July 2002 article in The Philippine Star newspaper alleged that Meiring had been working on assignment for the CIA in Mindanao from the mid-1990s. In October 2016, Rodrigo Duterte alleged that he had been approached by a CIA representative during his presidential campaign, who asked him to quietly drop active investigations into Meiring and the circumstances of the explosion in his hotel room. Duterte had previously been quoted by the media in linking the Evergreen Hotel explosion, the Davao City airport attack and the Sasa ferry port blast to covert American intelligence agencies.
