= Naval Base Camilo Osias =

Naval base in Cagayan, Philippines

- Santa Ana, Cagayan in the Philippines

Site information
- Owner: Philippine Navy

Location
- Coordinates: 18°30′15″N 122°08′55″E

Naval Base Camilo Osias is a naval base of the Philippine Navy in Santa Ana, Cagayan. It has an airstrip.

The United States Armed Forces has access to the base via the Enhanced Defense Cooperation Agreement between the United States and the Philippines.

The Philippines are seeking American assistance to repair the airstrip and construct a pier.
