= Cagayan North International Airport =

Airport in Lal-lo, Cagayan, Philippines

Cagayan North International Airport Sangalubongan a Pagpatayaban ti Amianan a Cagayan Paliparang Pandaigdig ng Hilagang Cagayan
- IATA: LLC; ICAO: RPLH

Summary
- Airport type: Public
- Operator: Cagayan Premium Venture Development Corporation
- Serves: Cagayan
- Location: Barangays San Mariano and Dagupan, Lal-lo, Cagayan
- Elevation AMSL: 45 m (148 ft)
- Coordinates: 18°10′52″N 121°44′42″E

Map
- Location in the Philippines

Runways
Direction	Length		Surface
Direction	m	ft	Surface
04/22	2,100	6,890	Concrete

Cagayan North International Airport (Ilocano: Sangalubongan a Pagpatayaban ti Amianan nga Cagayan, Filipino: Paliparang Pandaigdig ng Hilagang Cagayan; IATA: LLC, ICAO: RPLH), sometimes referred as Lal-lo International Airport, is an airport serving the general area of the Cagayan Special Economic Zone, located in the northern province of Cagayan, Philippines. It is located between the Barangays of San Mariano and Dagupan in Lal-lo, Cagayan and is accessible via Magapit–Santa Teresita Road. The airport has been built to support the Cagayan Special Economic Zone in northern Cagayan, in tandem with Port Irene that will handle seaborne traffic. The airport is currently served by the charter airline Royal Air Philippines.

== History ==
With an estimated total cost of ₱1.66 billion ($34.2 million), the 150-hectare airport hub is the result of a 50-year joint venture agreement between Cagayan Economic Zone Authority (CEZA) and Cagayan Land Property Development Corporation (CLPDC) with the private consortium contributing 58.3% in equity or ₱966 million while CEZA's share is 41.7% or ₱691 million. The airport was envisioned to be the international gateway in Northeast Luzon. Initially, it was constructed to serve the domestic flights to other airports in the country and international flights to Japan, Hong Kong, Taiwan, Singapore and China. An aviation park and hangar hub was also envisioned for the airport where business and private jets can park.

On June 23, 2016, the Civil Aviation Authority of the Philippines (CAAP) granted the airport new certification allowing it to handle aircraft with a capacity of up to 100 seats, up from only 29-seat capacity aircraft under the previous certification. The new certification has allowed the possibility of regular commercial flights to begin operation at the airport. At the time of the new certification, the airport has fielded around 168 flights ranging from tourism, diplomatic visits and emergency services. Meanwhile, the airport served its first two commercial flights with two planes from Macau landing in the airport in March 2018.

On April 3, 2023, the United States Department of Defense (DoD) announced the airport as one of four new sites in the Enhanced Defense Cooperation Agreement, granting them access for "joint and combined training" between American and Philippine armed forces as well as facilitate a more efficient response to natural and humanitarian disasters. The U.S. DoD will work with the Philippine Department of National Defense to "pursue modernization projects" at the new locations.

== Facilities ==
The airport's major facilities are the control tower, passengers’ lounge. It also has a runway measuring 2,100 meters (6,900 ft) long by 45 meters (148 ft) wide, following the standards of the International Civil Aviation Organization (ICAO). This allows the airport to accommodate narrow-body commercial airliners such as Airbus A320 and Boeing 737.

== See also ==
- Tuguegarao Airport
- Cagayan Special Economic Zone
- List of airports in the Philippines
