= Antonio Bautista Air Base =

Military airport in Puerto Princesa, Palawan, Philippines

- Puerto Princesa, Palawan in Philippines
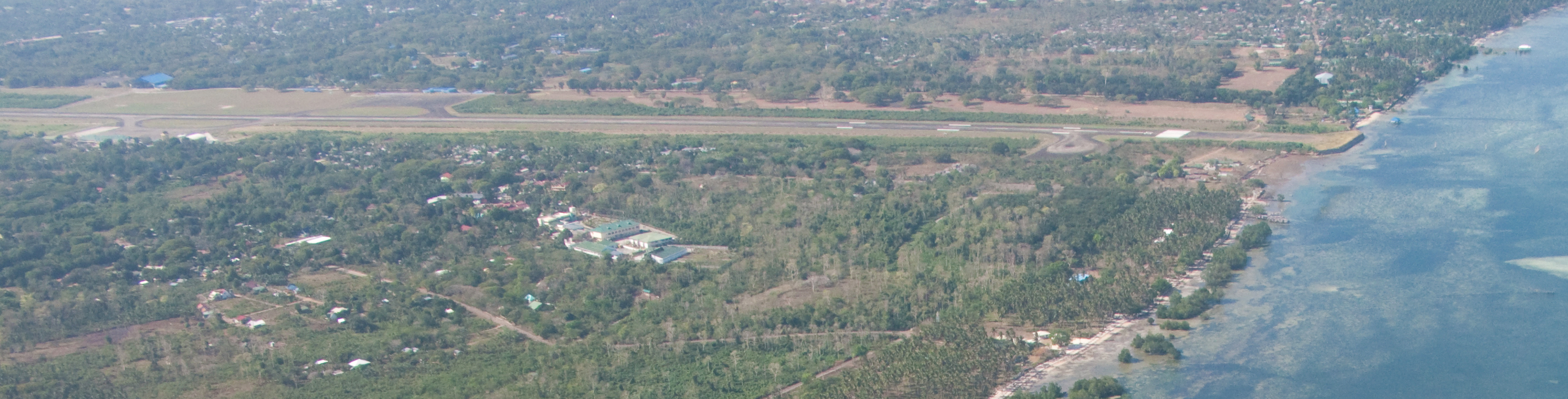
- Runway of Antonio Bautista Air Base

Site information
- Type: Military airbase
- Owner: Government of the Philippines
- Operator: Philippine Air Force; United States Air Force (under jurisdiction of Enhanced Defense Cooperation Agreement)

Location
- Coordinates: 09°44′39″N 118°45′32″E

Site history
- Built: March 21, 1975; 51 years ago
- Built by: US POWs during Japanese occupation
- In use: 1975–present (Philippines)

Garrison information
- Garrison: 4th Tactical Operations Command

Airfield information
- IATA: PPS; ICAO: RPVP

Summary
- Elevation AMSL: 22 m (72 ft)
- Coordinates: 09°44′31″N 118°45′29″E

Map
- Antonio Bautista Air Base location in the Philippines

Runways
Direction	Length		Surface
Direction	m	ft	Surface
09/27	2,600	8,530	asphalt/concrete

Antonio Bautista Air Base (IATA: PPS, ICAO: RPVP) is a military airbase of the Philippine Air Force (PAF), located in Puerto Princesa, Palawan, Philippines. The base shares the single 2,600 metres (8,530 feet) long runway with Puerto Princesa International Airport. The PAF base was named as an honour to Colonel Antonio Bautista, who was killed in action on 11 January 1974 as a F-86 Sabre pilot while engaged in a close air support (CAS) mission against Muslim rebels.

== World War II ==
On 14 December 1944, occupying Japanese soldiers herded 150 American POWs who were building the airstrip on Palawan Island (today's Puerto Princesa International Airport and Antonio Bautista Air Base) into air raid trenches, doused them with gasoline, set them afire, then machine-gunned and bayoneted them to death. Among them was Army Capt. Fred Bruni the Palawan POWs' senior officer, who was from Janesville, Wisconsin, with the 192nd Tank Battalion. Only eleven men escaped the 'Palawan Massacre', to be rescued by guerrillas. The story of their ordeal persuaded General Douglas MacArthur that the rumoured order for the retreating Japanese to "kill all" prisoners was being implemented, thus his rush to liberate the Philippines.

US Army Air Forces units based here included:

- Headquarters, XIII Fighter Command (1 March 1945 to November 1945)
- 42d Bombardment Group (March 1945 to January 1946)
- 347th Fighter Group (6 March to December 1945)
- 419th Night Fighter Squadron (6 March 1945 to 10 January 1946)
- 550th Night Fighter Squadron (Det) (9 to 19 June 1945)

== Current use ==
The airbase is currently used as a jump off point to supply the soldiers stationed in the municipality of Kalayaan as well as soldiers in the BRP Sierra Madre.

== Future development ==
Antonio Bautista Air Base is one of the nine airbases nominated for the priority development programmes of the Philippine Air Force (PAF). The PAF planned to construct two additional hangars to store relief supplies and accommodate additional air assets, including long-range patrol aircraft and two PZL W-3 Sokol helicopters to be stationed there in the future.

On 18 March 2016, the United States and the Philippines signed a deal to allow US forces to use five bases in the country as a counter to the Chinese deployments in the Spratly Islands, including Antonio Bautista Air Base.

A new Humanitarian Assistance and Disaster Relief warehouse is expected to be built at the airbase.
