= Abdul Qodir Hasan Baraja =

Indonesian cleric

- Born: 10 August 1944 (age 82); Taliwang, Sumbawa, Japanese-occupied Dutch East Indies
- Education: Pondok Modern Darussalam Gontor
- Occupation: Cleric
- Years active: 1970–present
- Known for: Caliph of Khilafatul Muslimin

Abdul Qodir Hasan Baraja (born 10 August 1944) is an Indonesian cleric, and the founder and Caliph of Khilafatul Muslimin. He is a former Darul Islam activist, and Komando Jihad combatant which was active during late 1970s to 1980s.

== Early life and education ==
Baraja graduated from Pondok Modern Darussalam Gontor sometime before 1970. Previous report reported that he was worked as a teacher at Ngruki Islamic boarding school founded by Abu Bakar Ba'asyir, his colleague and fellow Gontor alumni after graduation. However, Ngruki school denied the report and clarified that there was another Baraja, Abdullah Baraja, who was the person in question, not Abdul Qodir Hasan Baraja. Abdullah Baraja was not relative of Abdul Qodir Hasan Baraja and Abdullah already died in 2007.

At some point in 1970, Baraja joined Darul Islam, eight years after the defeat of Darul Islam rebellion. He later moved to Lampung and founded Darul Islam Lampung Branch in 1970s.

== History in terrorism acts ==
Baraja had incarcerated with charge of terrorism two times. First on 1979 for his involvement in Warman Terror (a Darul Islam armed terror acts), and in 1985 in aftermath of 1985 Borobudur bombing. During the time of Warman Terror in 1979, he played a role in the Warman Terror Network as part of Adah Jaelani cell that operated in Lampung and provided financial support to the terror. In 1985, he involved at Borobudur bombing which damaged 9 stupas of Borobudur.

== Co-founder of Indonesian Mujahideen Council ==
Baraja also a co-founder of Indonesian Mujahideen Council when the council established on 2000. He was one of the first 36-membered Ahlul Halli wal 'Aqdi Board of Indonesian Mujahideen Council during the First Mujahideen Congress on 5-7 August 2000 which established Ba'asyir as National Leader of the Indonesian Mujahideen Council.

== Khilafatul Muslimin and Caliph of Khilafatul Muslimin ==
Khilafatul Muslimin was established by Baraja sometime at 1977, but formally established as mass organization on 18 July 1997. Baraja claimed that, during the three first years of the Khilafatul Muslimin existence, the organization did not have Caliph position. Caliph position later established on 2000 after Khilafatul Muslimin Congress in Yogyakarta.

== 2022 capture ==
In aftermath of 2022 caliphate convoy, Indonesian National Police later hunted every Khilafatul Muslimin members responsible in the convoy. Baraja was captured in Lampung on 7 June 2022 for his involvement in promoting caliphate and attempted to replace state ideology Pancasila with Islamic Caliphate.

Baraja was sentenced with 10 years imprisonment and fined 50 million rupiahs on 24 January 2023. His organization also outlawed by the court decision.
