= Khilafatul Muslimin =

Khilafatul Muslimin خلافة المسلمين
- Abbreviation: KM
- Predecessor: Darul Islam Lampung Branch
- Formation: 18 July 1997; 29 years ago
- Founder: Abdul Qodir Hasan Baraja
- Founded at: Bandar Lampung, Lampung
- Dissolved: 24 January 2023; 3 years ago
- Type: Mass organization
- Legal status: Banned
- Purpose: Political, social, economic and culture
- Headquarters: Bandar Lampung, Lampung
- Region served: Indonesia
- Members: 14 thousand people (2022)
- Official language: Arabic, Indonesian
- Caliph: Abdul Qodir Hasan Baraja

Khilafatul Muslimin (Arabic: خلافة المسلمين, "Caliphate of Muslims", also known by its abbreviation KM) was a Pan-Islamist organization based in Bandar Lampung, Indonesia led by Abdul Qodir Hasan Baraja. Claiming to be a non-violent movement, it advocated for the establishment of a worldwide caliphate above nations. The organization came to public attention when its members spread pamphlets about the rise of caliphate in Jakarta in early June 2022. As a result, many of its members were arrested and Abdul Qodir Hasan was detained by Indonesian National Police.

The group is splinter group of Darul Islam. The organization has strong ties to Hizb-ut-Tahrir Indonesia, which already banned in 2017 by Indonesia government, and potentially affiliated with Islamic State of Iraq and the Levant.

Remaining members of the East Lampung branch of Khilafatul Muslimin announced their disbanding on 13 June 2022. This was followed by branches in Jakarta, Jepara, Wonogiri, Kaur, and other places. Local bans were also imposed in Maros Regency, and Jakarta.

The organization was outlawed on 24 January 2023 by the court decision and senior leadership including Baraja sentenced to imprisonment.

== History and teachings ==
Khlifatul Muslimin was established sometime at 1977 by Abdul Qodir Hasan Baraja, but formally established as mass organization on 18 July 1997. Later investigation recovered a copy of membership handbook possessed by an unknown member of the organization. The handbook revealed that the organization in fact is continuation of Darul Islam movement. The handbook confirmed their historical lineage to Darul Islam and allegiance to Kartosuwiryo teachings. The handbook praised Kartosuwiryo and referred his teachings as the source.

Previous report reported that the founder, Abdul Qadir Hasan Baraja was a teacher at Ngruki Islamic boarding school and colleague of Abu Bakar Ba'asyir, in which both of Baraja and Ba'asyir are Gontor alumni. However, the information denied by Ngruki school. At some point in 1970, Baraja joined Darul Islam, eight years after the defeat of Darul Islam rebellion. He founded Darul Islam Lampung Branch in 1970s. Baraja had incarcerated with charge of terrorism two times. First in 1979 for his involvement in Warman Terror, and in 1985 in aftermath of 1985 Borobudur bombing. Baraja claimed that, during the three first years of the Khilafatul Muslimin existence, the organization did not have Caliph position. Caliph position later established in 2000 after Khilafatul Muslimin Congress in Yogyakarta.

Despite its status religious mass organization, Khilafatul Muslimin is not coordinated and not cooperated with Ministry of Religious Affairs, in which the laws mandated to. As the result, Khilafatul Muslimin activities before 2022 are unknown. Despite that, Khilafatul Muslimin owners have registered Khilafatul Muslimin Educational Institution on 2011. Baraja claimed that his Khilafatul Muslimin is not a mass organization, but a model system, although operated as one.

While the organization claimed to be non-violent, the organization actively advocated worldwide caliphate system. However, there are major differences on Khilafatul Muslimin interpretation and approach on caliphate with other pan-Islamist groups:

1. Caliph position is much a spiritual and religious leader position rather a political one.
2. Caliphate is not a state, but a borderless trans-national congregation centered to a Caliph as spiritual and religious ruler.
3. Caliph position is positioned in such manner similar to a Pope, while the territory ruled by a Caliph similar to Holy See. Thus, a Khilafatul Muslimin Caliph is not involved in stately affairs and policies except in religious and worship affairs.

The organization itself also claims that they are not against Pancasila and that caliphate is "roof above Pancasila". Khilafatul Muslimin later reaffirmed the claim and also stated that the enemies of Pancasila are communism, Marxism, Leninism, capitalism, oligarchies, and corruptors. An expert on terrorism and intelligence, Stanislaus Riyanta, mentioned that new pattern adopted by Khilafatul Muslimin by claiming to be a non-violent movement is more dangerous in nature, due to ability to infiltrate deeper into society and indirectly inspire lone attacks.

Anti-DI activist and researcher at NII Crisis Center, Ken Setiawan revealed, based on studies of ideological works and recruitment system of Khilafatul Muslimin, Khilafatul Muslimin is very similar with Darul Islam.

== Structure and membership ==
Based on study by Prihandono Wibowo, researcher from East Java National Development University "Veteran" Surabaya, Khilafatul Muslimin possessed presence in 16 provinces of Indonesia, scattered across 68 cities/regencies, with total of 310 branch offices in Indonesia. While according to National Counter Terrorism Agency (BNPT), Khilafatul Muslimin branches are found in 25 provinces. Overseas branches offices in United States of America, Australia, and "other Asian countries" also existed, as claimed by the organization.

=== Organization Structure ===
Khilafatul Muslimin is described as "state-like" and had several ministry-like structures. The ministries however, separated between the "Caliphate ministries" served under the Caliph and "State Ministries" served under the Emir of the State. The office of the Emir of the State itself subordinate to the Caliph and responsible to exercised day-to-day activities of the organization in their respective states.

On 13 June, Polda Metro Jaya has captured the alleged "minister of education" of Khilafatul Muslimin at Mojokerto, East Java, but it is unknown if the person a caliph ministry or state ministry.

The full structure of Khilafatul Muslimin during its existence is listed as follows:

==== Caliphate ====
- Office of the Caliph/Supreme Leader of Khilafatul Muslimin Umma
  - Office of the Caliphate Secretary
  - Caliphate Ministry of Finance in Infaq Affairs
  - Caliphate Ministry of Finance in Zakat Affairs
  - Caliphate Comptroller of Finance
  - Caliphate Ministry of Education and Teaching
  - Caliphate Ministry of Intelligence and Defense
  - Caliphate Ministry of Data and Inspection
  - Caliphate Ministry of Public Relation
  - Caliphate Ministry of Waqf
  - Caliphate Ministry of News Affairs and Broadcasting
  - Khilafatul Muslimin States (Daulah)
  - Bornean Khilafatul Muslimin branches administered directly by the Caliphate due to no Daulah established in Kalimantan Island until the organization dissolution.

==== Daulah (State) ====
Khilafatul Muslimin possessed constituent polity "states" designed similar to U.S. states, called Daulah. Each state structured into state government similar to an U.S. state-government. There were 3 Daulahs in Khilafatul Muslimin: Eastern Indonesia (responsible to all Eastern Indonesian region), Sumatera (responsible to all Sumatera Island), Java (responsible to all Java Island). Each Daulah led by Amir Daulah (Emir of the State), equivalent to a governor. The Amir Daulah assisted by state ministries for running day-to-day activities within the state. All Daulah possessed similar structure:

- Office of the Amir Daulah/Emir of the State
  - State Secretary
  - State Ministry of Finance
  - State Comptroller of Finance
  - State Ministry of Education and Teaching
  - State Ministry of Intelligence and Defense
  - State Ministry of Data and Inspection
  - State Ministry of Public Relation
  - Khilafatul Muslimin Regional Offices (Wilayah)

==== Wilayah (Region) ====
At Daulah level, Khilafatul Muslimin divided into regions called Wilayah. Each Daulah has several numbers of Wilayah. There were 17 Wilayahs (5 under Eastern Indonesia, 5 under Sumatera, and 7 under Java). Each Wilayah led by Amir Wilayah (Emir of the Region). The Amir Wilayah assisted by state ministries for running day-to-day activities within the region. In a Wilayah, there were at least 1 Ummul Quro (Nucleus city) and several Mas'ul Umma (Areal Coordinator of the Umma) located in town or regency level. All Wilayah possessed similar structure:

- Office of the Amir Wilayah/Emir of the Region
  - Regional Secretary
  - Department of Finance
  - Wilayah Comptroller of Finance
  - Department of Education and Teaching
  - Department of Intelligence and Defense
  - Department of Data and Inspection
  - Department of Public Relation
  - Ummul Quro
    - Office of the Amir Ummul Quro/Emir of the Ummul Quro
    - Ummul Quro Secretary
    - Division of Finance
    - Ummul Quro Comptroller of Finance
    - Division of Education and Teaching
    - Division of Intelligence and Defense
    - Division of Public Relation
  - Mas'ul Umma
    - Office of the Mas'ul Umma (Areal Coordinator of Khilafatul Muslimin Umma)
    - Division of Finance
    - Mas'ul Comptroller of Finance
    - Division of Intelligence and Defense

=== Membership ===
In aftermath of Bandar Lampung raid, Police uncovered "tens of thousands" Khilafatul Muslimin membership dossiers from Khilafatul Muslimin HQ. From the dossiers, Police found that the organization issued "Citizen Identification Number" which the organization member used as replacement of Electronic National Identification Card issued by the government. The members were also required to pay their membership fee ("infaq") of Rp1,000 per day and sadaqah of 10%-30% amount of their monthly income.

Members of Khilafatul Muslimin already penetrated into Indonesian religious organizations and political parties. At least, as investigation found, members at Banten branch were infiltrated like-minded organization and party structure. Investigation revealed that Muhammadiyah and National Mandate Party in Banten already infiltrated with Khilafatul Muslimin agents.

== Education services and misuse of education services ==
Polda Metro Jaya also claimed there are 30 schools (or pesantrens) that affiliated with caliphate ideologies of Khilafatul Muslimin, and the minister of education is responsible of it. One pesantren owned by Khilafatul Muslimin in Batu Putuk, Bandar Lampung was dissolved. Khilafatul Muslimin also spread their doctrines into 25 pesantrens and 2 universities in 2 years, and the graduates will be given the title Bachelor of Islamic Caliphate (SKHI). Such irregularity and misuse of Pesantren status had been investigated and considered by Police that Khilafatul Muslimin had operated a kind of degree mill institution.

Separate investigation conducted by National Counter Terrorism Agency, Ministry of Religious Affairs, and Ministry of Education, Culture, Research, and Technology uncovered irregularities of Khilafatul Muslimin schools that summarized below:

- Being unregistered in both Ministry of Religious Affairs and Ministry of Education, Culture, Research, and Technology databases, thus the schools were illegally run.
- Curriculum irregularities, such as:
  - Deliberate removal of Pancasila studies and Constitution of Indonesia in all levels of Khilafatul Muslimin-run education institutions.
  - Deliberately not possessing Indonesia flag, national symbol, and presidential portraits of President and Vice President and teaching the students to not salute to them.
  - Only saluting Khilafatul Muslimin flag and their own Caliph.
  - Learning to disrespect and hate against Indonesia as state in general and praising only caliphate.
  - Teaching to not mandatorily obey to Indonesian laws and government and its officials but must mandatorily obey Khilafatul Muslimin and its Caliph.
  - Teaching political taqiya to disguise their own political belief from general public.
  - Shorter study time. Only 3 years for elementary, 2 years for junior high, 2 years for senior high, and 2 years for undergraduate. This is contrary to 6-3-3-4 system used in Indonesia.
  - Issuing illegal degree Bachelor of Islamic Caliphate (SKHI).
- Although the education was given free from tuition fees, parents of students are mandatorily must pledge allegiance to Khilafatul Muslimin Caliph and charged 1,000 rupiahs daily for educational fee as donation and additional 10 - 30% "zakat" to the school.

Ministry of Education, Culture, Research, and Technology declared that the schools are illegal. As to 20 June 2022, those schools are closed. National Counter Terrorism Agency later opened crisis center and emergency counseling service to ex-students and tried to find solutions for all of them.

== 2018 Tambun terror plot ==
In May 2018, a cell of terrorist operated at Tambun District, Bekasi attempted to attack Mobile Brigade Corps HQ. However, their plan were foiled with Indonesian National Police intelligence, Bureau of Intelligence and Security. The investigation later found that the terrorist cell was jointly manned with Jamaah Ansharut Daulah and Khilafatul Muslimin members.

== 2022 Caliphate convoy and nationwide crackdown ==
Early June 2022, Khilafatul Muslimin sporadically held Caliphate Convoy in several cities across Indonesia such as Jakarta, Bekasi, Karawang, Purwakarta, Priangan, Sumedang, Cirebon, Brebes, Tegal, Klaten, Solo, Surabaya. They spread pamphlets about the rise of caliphate, and agitated population to revolt against Joko Widodo administration. Previously, the convoy was held three months once (or four months) since 2018 and originally supposed as prelude for the show World Islamic Caliphate Shiar (Indonesian: Syiar Kekhalifahan Islam Dunia).

As result of their act, police launched raid across Indonesia and dismantle their offices. From the raid, it later revealed that the organization had amass large sum of money from embezzlement and misuse of religious donations. Some weapons and books related to Darul Islam and Hizb ut-Tahrir Indonesia are also confiscated from their offices. Police raid at Khilafatul Muslimin HQ at Islamic Caliphate Mosque, Bandar Lampung confiscated "some billions" rupiahs of operational funds. A brief of analysis, released on 11 June 2022 by Indonesian Ulema Council Agency for Countermeasures Against Religious Extremism and Terrorism revealed that Khilafatul Muslimin is funded by pan-Islamist trans-national donations donated from Malaysia, United States, and Saudi Arabia. Indonesian National Police and Indonesian Financial Transaction Reports and Analysis Center later launched joint investigation to track the funding network.

After the police raids, police launched campaign to hunt every responsible members. The police forces currently have captured 23 members of Khilafatul Muslimin. In Pringsewu Regency, attributes and signposts of Khilafatul Muslimin were torn down by the local police. In Tapin Regency, signpost of the organization were torn down by locals citing that they feel disturbed by presence of the organization there.

== Caliphate Village ==
Caliphate Village (Indonesian: Kampung Khilafah) was a village located at Karangsari village, Jati Agung, South Lampung Regency, Lampung province, of which being inhabited by 48 families, all of them were Khilafatul Muslimin members. The village was only becoming more guarded after the arrest of Abdul Qadir Hasan Baraja, and the people there are prohibited from smoking and required to cover their awrah. Caliphate Village was reportedly first inhabited from 2000s, and it was founded on 2004 at the property owned by Surahman, a member of Khilafatul Muslimin who died on 2019. Caliphate Village also owns Ukhuwwah Islamiyah pesantren and Al-Mustasyifa Khilafatul Muslimin clinic.

It was announced on 15 June 2022 that Caliphate Village will be replaced by Pancasila Village (Indonesian: Kampung Pancasila), named after the national ideology, and the attributes of Khilafatul Muslimin were torn down by officers at the same day.

== Reactions ==
The head of Polda Metro Jaya, Fadil Imran said that Khilafatul Muslimin attempted to create a state within a state.
