= Al-Mukmin Islamic school =

The Al-Mukmin Islamic boarding school also known as Pesantren Al-Mukmin and Pondok Ngruki, is a pesantren ('Islamic boarding school') located in Ngruki, a suburb in the regency of Sukoharjo, Central Java, Indonesia. It was founded 1972 by the alleged 'spiritual head' of Jemaah Islamiyah, Abu Bakar Bashir, and by Abdullah Sungkar. Al-Mukmin's activities were initially limited to religious discussion after dhuhr (midday prayer). Following increasing interest, the founders expanded Al-Mukmin into a madrasah ('Islamic school') and then into a pesantren. It currently houses over 2000 students aged between 12 and 18.

A number of people linked to the school have been implicated in a series of Sunni Islamist terrorist attacks; the International Crisis Group has described the school as an "Ivy League" for Jemaah Islamiyah recruits. Pictures of AK47s are hung in hallways, and a sign above a classroom reads:

"Death in the way of Allah is our highest aspiration."

"Live as a noble man or die as a martyr."

== Alumni ==
Teachers at the school have included:

- Hambali
- Abu Bakar Bashir
- Abdul Qadir Baraja - member of the executive committee of Majelis Mujahidin Indonesia. Author of Hijrah dan Jihad. Arrested in January 1979 in connection with "Terror Warman", served three years, arrested again in connection with bombings in East Java and Borobodur, in 1985.
- Abdurrahim Thayib (a.k.a. Abdurahim bin Toyib) - A former teacher who was sentenced to Nine years in prison in February 2009 for aiding and abetting JI military commander Abu Dujana.

Among the school's graduates are:

Connected to the 2002 Bali bombing which killed 202 people.

- Amrozi bin Nurhasyim - Convicted and sentenced to death.
- Ali Ghufron alias "Muklas"-
- Ali Imron -
- Joni Hendrawan a.k.a. "Idris", "project manager"
- Fadlullah Hasan. - Gold that was stolen from a bank and converted to cash was deposited in Hasan's bank account, before being used to finance the Bali attack.
- Fathur Rahman al-Ghozi, - who was killed in Mindanao, Philippines. He was convicted in the December 2000 bombing of a Manila commuter train in which 22 people were murdered.
- Zulkarnaen - led an elite militant squad, whose members were recruited from hundreds of Indonesians who trained in Afghanistan and the Philippines.
- Abdul Rauf also known as "Sam bin Jahruddin". Bali bombings suspect, member of JI cell with Imam Samudra. Attended Pondok Ngruki from 1992 to 1997. Reportedly helped make the Bali bombs. Reported as killed, fighting in Syria.
- Aris Munandar, - alleged to be a JI fundraiser and who is still at large.

Connected to the 2003 Marriott Hotel bombing which killed 12 people and wounded 150 plus.

- Asmar Latin Sani - the suicide bomber in the 2003 Marriott attack. His severed head was later found on the fifth floor of the building.
- Joni Hendrawan a.k.a. "Idris", "project manager"
- Muhammad Saefudin - met Osama bin Laden in Afghanistan several times in 2001. Saefudin was alleged being groomed as the future Jemaah Islamiah leader.
- Muhammad Rais. - met Osama bin Laden in Afghanistan several times in 2001, and conveyed bin Laden messages to Abu Bakar Bashir. Convicted for storing the explosives used in Marriott hotel bombing.
- Masrizal bin Ali Umar - Secured the detonators used in the blast with Azahari Husin.

Connected to the 2009 Jakarta bombings was;

- Nur Hasbi- Graduated with, and was a friend of Asmar Latin Sani. He was one of the suicide bombers in the 2009 Marriott hotel attack.
