= Joni Hendrawan =

Indonesian terrorist

Joni Hendrawan, also known as Idris, is an Indonesian, who after escaping conviction for his role in the 2002 Bali bombings, was convicted for the 2003 Marriott Hotel bombing.

== Early life ==
Hendrawan grew up in the town of Pekanbaru Indonesia, and then went on to complete his Islamic studies at Pondok Ngruki The religious school founded in 1972 by the 'spiritual head' of Jemaah Islamiah, Abu Bakar Bashir, and Abdullah Sungkar.

== 2002 Bali bombings ==
Idris played a key role in the 2002 Bali bombings in both the planning and execution stages. He attended most of the key planning meetings for the blast, and helped secure the safe houses and the vehicle used. He scouted the targets, taught the Sari Club suicide mujahid how to drive and he even detonated himself the smaller of the bombs outside the US consulate.

A report released in August 2020 by the United States-Indonesia Society (USINDO) described the events as follows:

The investigators were thus able to recreate the bombers activities. Amrozi, Idris and Ali Imron had simply walked into a dealership and purchased a new Yamaha motorbike, after asking how much they could re-sell it for if they returned it in a few days. Imron used the motorbike to plant the small bomb outside the U.S. Consulate. Idris then rode the motorbike as Imron drove two suicide bombers in the Mitsubishi to the nightclub district in Kuta. He stopped near the Sari Club, instructed one suicide bomber to put on his explosives vest and the other to arm the vehicle bomb. The first bomber headed to Paddy's Pub. Idris then left the second bomber, who had only learned to drive in a straight line, to drive the minivan the short distance to the Sari Club. Idris picked up Imron on the Yamaha and the duo headed back into Pontianak. Idris dialed the number of the Nokia to detonate the bomb at the Consulate. The two suicide bombers exploded their devices. Imron and Idris dropped the motorbike at a place where it eventually attracted the attention of the caretaker.

Idris confessed his part in the attack, however he successfully appealed conviction over the attack arguing that to Indonesia's constitutional court that the terrorism charges were applied retrospectively.

== Arrest ==
Idris was arrested in 2003 after attempting a bank robbery to fund a new terrorist attack. He was arrested in Medan in Sumatra after he and 10 other suspected members of Jemaah Islamiah killed three bank employees in the robbery which netted $20,000.

== Release ==
He was released quietly in 2009 after 5 years of his 10-year sentence. In his first interview with Australian media after his release, Hendrawan stated he; "would willingly wage jihad on Indonesian soil again".

== See also ==
- 2003 Marriott Hotel bombing
- 2002 Bali Bombing
