= Mohammed Jabarah =

Kuwaiti-Canadian convicted of terrorism-related offences

Mohammed Mansour Jabarah
- Born: December 21, 1981 (age 44); Kuwait City, Kuwait
- Detained at: Guantanamo Bay camp
- Other names: Sammy; Abu Hafs al-Kuwaiti
- Alleged to be a member of: Al-Qaeda and Jemaah Islamiyah
- Charge: Conspiring to perform acts of terrorism
- Penalty: Life imprisonment
- Status: Being held at ADX Florence, Colorado

Mohammed Mansour Jabarah (محمد منصور جبارة; born December 21, 1981) is a Kuwaiti-Canadian convicted of terrorism-related offences. Jabarah was active in al-Qaeda and Jemaah Islamiyah circles, and was arrested in 2002.

He agreed to cooperate with authorities, but is currently serving a life sentence in ADX Florence after he violated his release conditions.

== Life ==
Jabarah was born in Al Sabah Hospital in Kuwait City, and traveled to Egypt and Saudi Arabia with his parents as a child.

Jabarah moved to Canada with his family on August 16, 1994 at the age of 12 and attended Holy Cross Catholic Secondary School in St. Catharines, Ontario. He intended to become an ophthalmologist. Their father opened a gas station in St. Catharines.

In 1999, he graduated from high school and was accepted into Saint Mary's University in Halifax, but decided not to pursue post-secondary education.

Both Jabarah and his brother returned to Kuwait every summer to visit relatives, where they met with Islamic teacher Sulaiman Abu Ghaith, who would later become a spokesman for al-Qaeda. A childhood friend, Anas al-Kandari, introduced him to al-Qaeda and Osama bin Laden during summers in Kuwait. He returned to Canada and began fundraising, raising C$3,500 which he gave to Ghaith for the First Chechen War.

== Militant activity ==
In July 2000, Abdul Rahman left for an Afghan training camp, and the following month Mohammed flew to Kuwait where he met with Ghaith who paid his fare to Karachi, from whence he traveled to Peshawar and hiked on foot into Torkham where the two brothers met up, waiting for their promised camp to finish construction and hanging around the Sheik Shaheed Abu Yahya Training Camp near Kabul instead.

In early 2001, he was diagnosed by doctor Ayman al-Zawahiri with hepatitis, and given a month's bedrest. While his brother went home to Canada, Mohammed attended a 10-week program at Al Farouq training camp, where he declined an offer to become a trainer, before moving into a guesthouse in Kandahar where his brother later visited him.

He vowed allegiance to bin Laden in May or July 2001 in Kandahar. Bin Laden sent him to Khalid Sheik Mohammed, who paired Jabarah with Ahmed Sahagi as a partner in Karachi.

After meeting with Hambali, Jabarah received three addresses for communication with different email IDs for strictly different tasks each:

- "silver_crack2002" - only for sending Hambali some new topic letters initially to;
- "honda_civic12" - only for reading the letters from Hambali at;
- "bob_marley123" - only to reply to Hambali's letters via.

On September 10, 2001 - at the urging of Khalid Sheikh Mohammed, Jabarah left Pakistan and flew to Hong Kong where he stayed in a hotel. Two days later, he flew to Kuala Lumpur, where he stayed in a hotel in the Indian district, while meeting with militant contacts at a McDonald's in the food court of a local shopping mall. In late September, he took a bus to Singapore, where he met members of Jemaah Islamiyah anxious for him to give them al-Qaeda funds for their intended bombings. However the group was under surveillance, and arrested members confessed to meeting "Sammy", although Jabarah had fled the country. Authorities tracked down his identity through the landing card he had filled out upon arriving in Singapore, where he gave his true name and Canadian address.

In October, Jabarah returned to Singapore to meet with Fathur Rahman al-Ghozi who had arrived in-country on October 7 himself, and together "Sammy" and "Mike" met with militants plotting to attack embassies in Singapore. Shortly after, Jabarah and al-Ghozi travelled to Manila and were taken to see the American and Israeli embassies, which were dismissed as too difficult to attack, since the American establishment was set too far back from the road, and the Israeli was too well-guarded. After ten days in the Philippines, Jabarah flew back to Singapore.

For Mohammed, terrorism had always been a brotherhood. When he had travelled to Afghanistan for training, he had gone with his brother and best friend, and although he had left them behind...he had found a new circle of brothers.

— Stewart Bell, 2005

In November, Jabarah returned to Kuala Lampur and met with an al-Qaeda agent at the City One Plaza, where he was given $10,000 on each visit to take back to the militants planning the bombings. The following month, he received an email titled "Problem", which informed him that Singaporean colleagues had been arrested, which led him to flee to Bangkok where he met with Hambali, who urged him to escape back to the Middle East as quickly as possible. Hambali also informed him that the $70,000 he has passed on to JI militants would be used to hit "soft" targets like nightclubs in the region.

Jabarah flew to Dubai in January 2002. There, Jabarah met with his brother Abdul Rahman Jabarah, when both were already wanted al-Qaeda suspects; largely because Mohammed's Canadian passport had been found on December 8–9 in a raid by Singaporean authorities.

In March, he moved to Oman, where Mohammed ordered him to set up an Omani al Qaeda safe house.

== Arrest ==
Jabarah was arrested by Oman authorities (mistakenly, but incidentally referred to as Amman authorities by the American government) in February or March 2002. Not wishing to turn him over to American authorities ostensibly fearing they would mistreat him, Oman advised Canada to dispatch two Canadian Security Intelligence Service agents to come pick up their wayward citizen However, it has been suggested that Omani authorities "perhaps" made Jabarah the "subject of some interrogation which was improper".

His brother phoned their father Mansour, and was warned that Canadian authorities were looking for him as well.

Jabarah was returned to Canada on April 18, after a stopover in London, England and was interrogated by CSIS for four days. He claims to have seen an internal document left in the interrogation room which said "There is no evidence or not enough evidence to find Jabarah guilty. We did our best to convince the Omanis to convict him, but they said there is no evidence against Jabarah".

Meanwhile, CSIS agent Mike Pavlovic had managed to gain Jabarah's trust during a number of meetings at The Brass Rail strip club in Toronto and began trying to convince him to turn himself over to the Americans. However, he was reticent until presented with a slip of paper which he signed, after CSIS promised him he just had to visit the United States for a few hours and would be back in Canada before the end of the day. It was a lie, and Jabarah later referred to it as "betrayal", as he was handed over to American authorities who otherwise had no legal basis to prosecute him. The Canadian Civil Liberties Association subsequently demanded an investigation into the handling of the situation.

== Release, cooperation and later arrest ==
In May Jabarah agreed to cooperate with U.S. authorities and was turned over to them. He lived in a series of safe houses, working as a double agent for the Americans, and helped them track both Khalid Sheikh Mohammed and Osama bin Laden as part of what he was told was a plea bargain.

Less than three months after the crash of American Airlines Flight 587 in Queens, New York, rumors were already suggesting that it had been destroyed by an unknown terrorist with a shoe bomb similar to the one found on Richard Reid. Four months later, Jabarah stated that Mohamed's lieutenant Abu Abdelrahman had told him that Reid and Jdey had both been enlisted by the al-Qaeda chief to carry out identical plots as part of a second wave of attacks against the United States, and that Jdey had blown up the flight.

He was re-arrested in the autumn, after a Federal Bureau of Investigation search of his house found a list of American agents and prosecutors, a knife and rope in his luggage and bomb-making instructions. He was held in the Manhattan Detention Center until he was subsequently sentenced to life imprisonment by judge Barbara S. Jones.

His oldest brother, Abdullah, later stated that he believed Mohammed was "a crazy bastard, fucking mad".
