= Muhammad Rais =

Indonesian terrorist

Muhammad Rais is an Indonesian convicted in May 2004 for involvement in the 2003 Marriott Hotel bombing, which killed 12 people and wounded over 150. He is a member of Jemaah Islamiyah and the brother-in-law of Noordin Mohammed Top. He attended the Al-Mukmin Islamic school which was founded by Abu Bakar Bashir, and while training in Afghanistan was responsible for relaying messages between Bashir and Osama bin Laden.

Rais transported the explosives used in the blast from various towns in Sumatra to the Indonesian capital Jakarta on the island of Java, where they were used in the bomb. He was responsible for recruiting the suicide bomber, and he drafted his best friend from his Islamic boarding school in Ngruki, Asmar Latin Sani. Rais was arrested in the month before the bombing.

He was sentenced to seven years in prison for his role. During his trial, Rais said "We saw the Marriott attack as a message from Osama bin Laden."
