= Mahfud =

Mahfud may refer to:

- Mahfudz Abdurrahman, member of the House of Representatives (Indonesia) for West Java Region VI (2009-)
- Mahfud Siddiq, member of the House of Representatives (Indonesia) from West Java VIII constituency (2009-2019), currently Secretary General of the Gelora Party
- Mahfud MD, Indonesian Minister of Defense in the National Unity Cabinet, former Chief Justice of the Constitutional Court of Indonesia, and currently the Coordinating Minister for Political, Legal and Security Affairs of the Republic of Indonesia in the Onward Indonesia Cabinet
- Mahmudi Yusron, also known as Mahfud or Yusron, pseudonyms used by Abu Dujana, a terrorism suspect believed to be involved in various terrorist incidents in Indonesia
