= Rusman Gunawan =

Rusman Gunawan, also known as Gun Gun, is an Indonesian jailed for "facilitating and aiding terrorism". He is the younger brother of the Jemaah Islamiah (JI) chief of operations, Hambali. Born in the West Java town of Cianjur, he moved to Pakistan to continue his religious studies at an Islamic school (madrassas). After graduating, he travelled to Afghanistan to train at the Al Ghuraba training camp.

From 1999 he was in charge of coordinating visits from JI Southeast Asian operatives to Afghanistan and Pakistan.

During 2002, while he attended Abu Bakar Islamic University in Pakistan, he took over as the "intermediary" for e-mail messages between al-Qaeda and his older brother Hambali, who at the time was hiding in Cambodia.

At the behest of the United States, he was arrested with six other Indonesian students during September 2003 in Karachi while he was attending the Abu Bakar Islamic University.

He was taken to Indonesia where he was sentenced in October 2004 to four years jail for "facilitating and aiding terrorism". In particular, he was found to have transferred the money (in Australian dollars) that was used to finance the 2003 Marriott Hotel bombing.
