= Jack Roche =

Australian terrorist

Jack Roche is an Australian convicted on a charge of conspiring to commit an offence provided for by the Crimes (Internationally Protected Persons) Act 1976 to destroy an internationally protected building, the Israeli Embassy in Canberra, Australia.

A Muslim convert, Roche was convicted of conspiring to bomb the Israeli embassy in Canberra in 2000. The plan was never carried out. In June 2004, he was sentenced to nine years in prison effective from 18 November 2002, when he was arrested. A non-parole period of 4 1/2 years was fixed, and as such he was released on 17 May 2007. He had faced a maximum sentence of 25 years.

== Early life ==
He was born Paul George Holland in 1953, in the English city of Hull. He then moved to Australia in 1978. In 1992, he converted to Islam.

== Later life ==
In October 1993 he then travelled to Indonesia to learn more about Islam, where he met his third, and current, wife. Upon his return to Sydney, Australia in November 1995 he began to associate with Australia's Jemaah Islamiyah members. In late 1996 he met the then Amir (Abdullah Sungkar) of the Jemaah Islamiyah group in Sydney and swore allegiance to him as a member of the group.

In 2000, Roche travelled to Afghanistan, where he met with al-Qaeda leaders, such as Khalid Shaikh Mohammed and ultimately Osama bin Laden. After that, he received basic training in bomb making ( a very basic 10-day course). He was then instructed to organize the set up of a terror cell in Australia which was to target Israeli interests in the country, including the plot to bomb the Israeli embassy. Roche admits to having taken part in the plot, but said he did not plan to carry it out. He admitted to carrying out surveillance on Australian targets, but was unsuccessful in bringing in new recruits for the cell. On 12 June 2000, Roche used a video camera that he had borrowed from Australian Muslim preacher Feiz Mohammad to film the Israeli embassy in Canberra, Australia.

In July 2000 Roche contacted ASIO via telephone 3 times in order to alert authorities as to dangerous elements evolving within Islamic communities in Australia. He had vital information regarding the locations of top Al Qaeda operatives including Khalid Shaikh Muhammd and Osama bin Ladin amongst others (in fact 6 of the FBI's top most wanted at the time). Roche maintains that had the necessary authorities taken the time to listen to his story, the events of 11 September 2001 and the Bali bombings in October 2002 could have been prevented. According to Roche, Indonesian Muslim cleric Abu Bakar Ba'asyir, whom Roche named as the head of Jemaah Islamiyah, eventually called him in August 2000 and ordered him to cancel the plan, having initially given Roche the go ahead to 'do what Hambali had instructed him to do'. Ba'asyir, who is in custody in Indonesia, and who is thought to be linked to terrorist organizations, denies the connection with Jemaah Islamiyah.

Since he was released on 17 May 2007, he lives in South Perth.

== See also ==
- List of notable converts to Islam
- Islamic terrorism
