= Zarkasih =

Indonesian Islamic militant (born c. 1962)

Zarkasih (born c. 1962) is an Indonesian former Islamic militant who was the leader of Jemaah Islamiah (JI), a South East Asian militant group, from 2004 until July 2007 when he was captured. Zarkasih goes by a single name and other aliases including Nuaim, Mbah, Abu Irsyad. As of December 2007, Zarkasih was facing anti-terrorism charges.

Zarkasih is believed to have joined the mujahideen in Afghanistan in the fight against the Soviets. He received military training in Pakistan and has links with al-Qaeda. He became the leader of JI in 2004.

Zarkasih was captured in July 2007 in Yogyakarta by Indonesian police, a few hours after the arrest of JI military commander Abu Dujana.

As of December 2007, Zarkasih and Abu Dujana were facing anti-terrorism charges including conspiracy to commit terrorist attacks, harboring fugitives and possession of illegal weapons and ammunition. They were also accused of shipping weapons and explosives to Sulawesi island to be used for anti-Christian attacks. Both men were facing the death penalty. He was found guilty of conspiracy to commit terrorist attacks, harboring fugitives, and stockpiling illegal arms in April 2008. He received a reduced sentence of 15 years in prison because the court determined he had only briefly served as JI's caretaker leader in 2005, not as its full emir. He was freed sometime before mid-2025. In May 2025, he spoke at a University of Indonesia event where he declared that JI had disbanded and he renounced violence. By July 2025, he was attending official meetings with government ministers alongside other ex-JI leaders.
