= Rizal Day bombings =

2000 attack in Metro Manila, Philippines

- Location: Metro Manila, Philippines
- Date: December 30, 2000; 25 years ago
- Target: Plaza Ferguson, Malate; A gas station in Makati; A cargo handling area at Ninoy Aquino International Airport; A bus on EDSA; A train at Blumentritt station, LRT Line 1
- Attack type: Black powder bombs
- Deaths: 22
- Injuries: ~100
- Perpetrators: Islamist terrorists (namely Abu Sayyaf and Jemaah Islamiyah)

The Rizal Day bombings, also referred to as the December 30 bombings, were a series of Islamic bombings that occurred around Metro Manila in the Philippines on December 30, 2000. The explosions occurred within a span of a few hours, killing 22 people and injuring over 100 others.

The blasts occurred during a national holiday in the Philippines, where December 30 is known as Rizal Day, commemorating the martyrdom of the country's national hero, José Rizal.

== Blast locations ==
Locations of places that were bombed.

Five locations were bombed almost simultaneously within the span of an hour. All of the locations were situated within Metro Manila on the island of Luzon.

- A bomb exploded at Plaza Ferguson in Malate, Manila, less than a hundred meters from the United States Embassy.
- Another detonated at a gasoline station just outside the Makati central business district. The site was along EDSA, across the street from the Dusit Hotel in Makati. Two members of the local police bomb squad died as a result.
- The cargo handling area of Ninoy Aquino International Airport (NAIA) was also targeted with at least one explosive device.
- Another device was detonated inside a bus traveling along EDSA. The bomb exploded while the bus was in the Cubao area of Quezon City. One passenger was killed, while several others were injured.
- The explosion that claimed the most casualties occurred in a train cab at the Blumentritt station of the LRT Line 1 in Santa Cruz, Manila.

== Type of explosive employed ==
The Philippine National Police identified the bombs as comprising one-kilogram black-powder, detonated using timing devices. In addition, confessions by the convicted perpetrators describe the bombs as made of ammonium nitrate-based explosives. Most of the components, such as blasting caps and detonation cords, were discovered to have come from the city of Talisay in the southern province of Cebu. The town is known for the production of blasting caps used in illegal fishing.

== Perpetrators ==
Initially, various Islamic groups were suspected of the bombings, including the Jemaah Islamiyah, the Moro Islamic Liberation Front, and the Moro National Liberation Front.

In September 2003, almost three years after the incident, the case remained unsolved for which the authorities responsible were berated by then-senate president Franklin Drilon.

In May 2003, Saifullah Yunos (a.k.a. Mukhlis Yunos), a suspect in the bombings, was arrested in the southern city of Cagayan de Oro as he was about to board a plane to Manila. Police were alerted to the suspect when he failed to explain bandages on his face and arms. A month later, he confessed to a level of involvement in the bombings. A member of the Moro Islamic Liberation Front's special operations group, he was charged with multiple murders and attempted murders for his role in the bombings.

In the following years, several members of the Jemaah Islamiyah were arrested for their suspected involvement in the bombings. In 2004, two Muslim men, Mamasao Naga (a.k.a. Zainal Paks) and Abdul Pata (a.k.a. Mohamad Amir) were arrested by Philippine armed forces in Marawi City. They were supposedly identified by Fathur Rahman Al-Ghozi, a known member of the Jemaah Islamiyah, as the ones responsible for the LRT-1 train cab bombing.

The MILF and the MNLF were later cleared by the Philippine National Police of any involvement in the attacks.

Fathur Rahman Al-Ghozi, an Indonesian national and member of the known terrorist group Jemaah Islamiyah, was convicted and sentenced to 17 years in prison for illegal possession of explosives in relation to the Rizal Day bombing incidents. In July 2003, Al-Ghozi, along with several other accomplices, escaped from their holding cell at Camp Crame. Al-Ghozi was later killed in a firefight with Philippine authorities on October 13, 2003.

On January 23, 2009, the three Rizal Day bombers, Mukhlis Hadji Yunos, Abdul Fatak Paute, and Mamasao Naga, were sentenced by the Manila Regional Trial Court Branch 29, under Judge Cielito Mendaro-Grulla, for up to 20 years in imprisonment for multiple murders and multiple attempted murders.

== Aftermath ==
In December 2006, almost six years after the bombings, Metro Manila police went on heightened alert due to bomb scares and the prospect of follow-up attacks on the anniversary of the bombings. The AFP followed suit days after, deploying numerous bomb squads and medical teams to both Fort Bonifacio and Luneta. In addition, the PNP's Explosives and Ordnance Division and SWAT deployed teams to LRT-1 stations along Taft Avenue, near one of the original bombing sites.

The bombings were briefly mentioned in one of the segments in the 2023 film, Ang Duyan ng Magiting, an official entry to the 19th Cinemalaya Independent Film Festival.

== See also ==
- 2005 Valentine's Day bombings
- 2004 SuperFerry 14 bombing
- Christmas Eve 2000 Indonesia bombings
- Strasbourg cathedral bombing plot (Christmas 2000)
