= American Airlines Flight 63 (2001) =

Failed act of terrorism

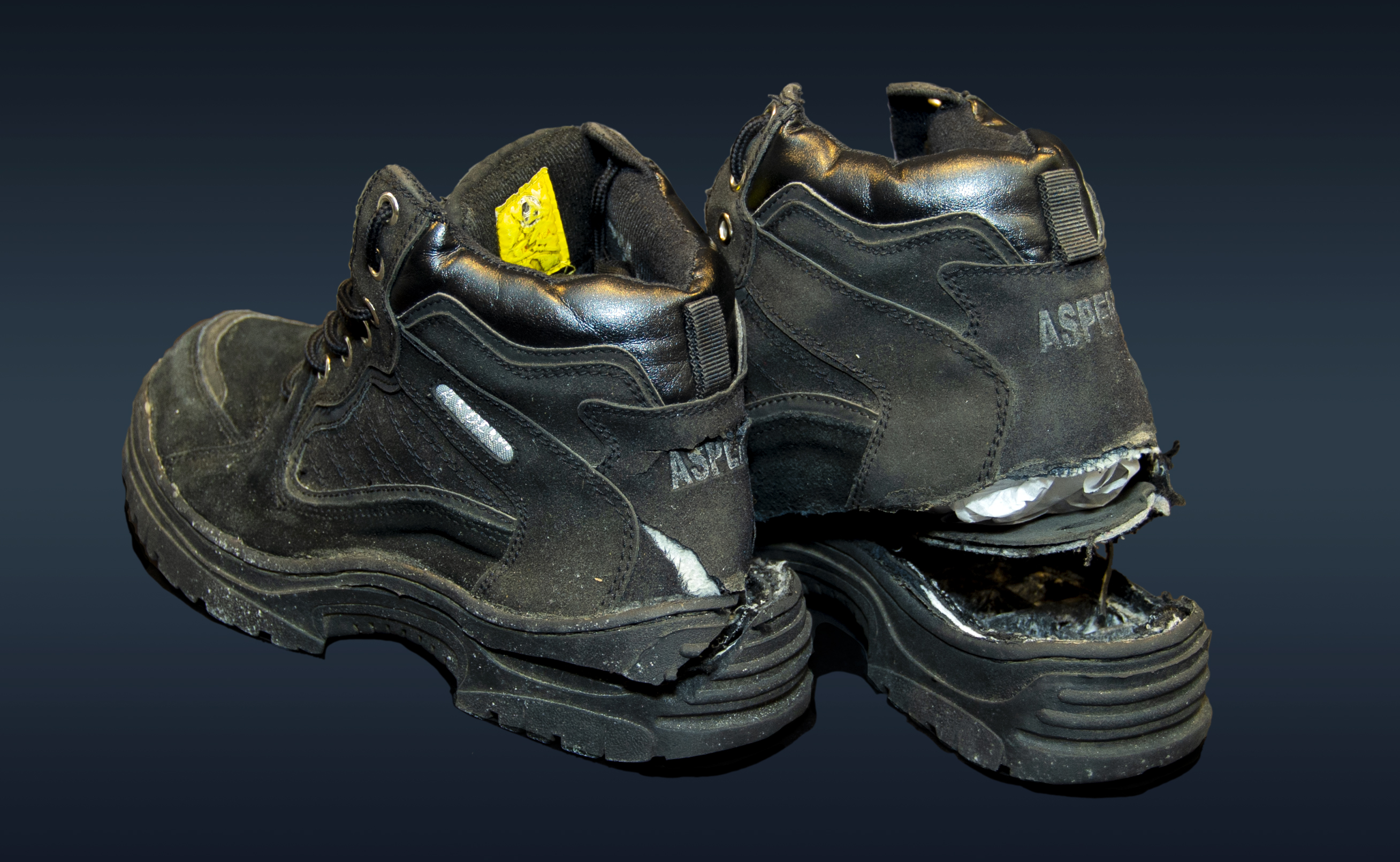
- Richard Reid's shoes
- Location: Airborne, between Paris, France and Miami, U.S.
- Date: December 22, 2001; 24 years ago
- Target: Civilian airliner
- Attack type: Attempted suicide bombing
- Weapon: Improvised explosive device concealed in shoe
- Deaths: 0
- Injuries: 1
- Perpetrator: al-Qaeda
- Assailant: Richard Reid
- Motive: Islamist terrorism through suicide bombing
- Convictions: 8 counts of terrorism

American Airlines Flight 63
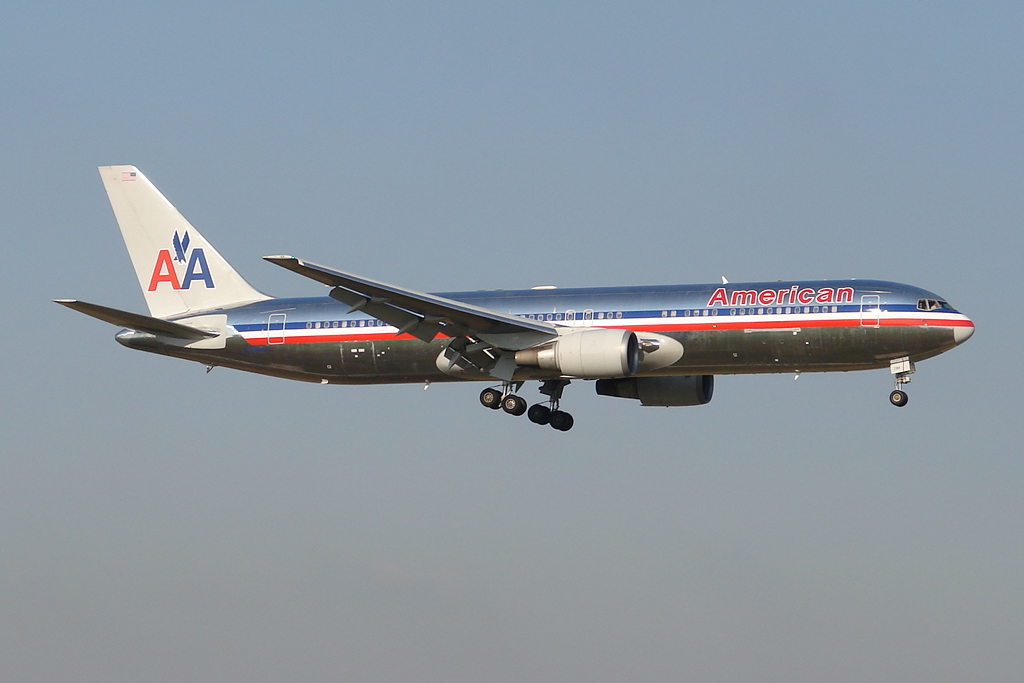
- N384AA, the aircraft involved, 11 years after the incident

Bombing attempt
- Date: December 22, 2001
- Summary: After bomb failed to detonate properly, flight performed an emergency diversion to Boston and landed safely
- Site: Airborne, between Paris and Miami

Aircraft
- Aircraft type: Boeing 767-300ER
- Operator: American Airlines
- IATA flight No.: AA63
- ICAO flight No.: AAL63
- Call sign: AMERICAN 63
- Registration: N384AA
- Flight origin: Charles de Gaulle Airport
- Destination: Miami International Airport
- Occupants: 197
- Passengers: 185
- Crew: 12
- Fatalities: 0
- Injuries: 0
- Survivors: 197

On December 22, 2001, a failed shoe bombing attempt occurred aboard American Airlines Flight 63. The aircraft, a Boeing 767 (registration N384AA) with 197 passengers and crew aboard, was flying from Charles de Gaulle Airport in Paris, France, to Miami International Airport in the U.S. state of Florida.

The perpetrator, Richard Reid, a British convert to Islam, was subdued by passengers after unsuccessfully attempting to detonate plastic explosives concealed within his shoes. The flight was diverted to Logan International Airport in Boston, escorted by American jet fighters, and landed without further incident. Reid was arrested and eventually sentenced to three life terms plus 110 years, without parole.

== Incident ==
As Flight 63 was flying over the Atlantic Ocean, Richard Reid, an Islamic fundamentalist from the United Kingdom and self-proclaimed al-Qaeda operative, carried shoes that were packed with two types of explosives. He had been refused permission to board the flight the day before.

Passengers on the flight complained of a smoky smell shortly after the meal service. One flight attendant, Hermis Moutardier, walked the aisles of the plane to locate the source. She found Reid sitting alone near a window, attempting to light a match. Moutardier warned him that smoking was not allowed on board the aircraft, and Reid promised to stop.

A few minutes later, Moutardier found Reid leaning over in his seat and unsuccessfully attempted to get his attention. After she asked him what he was doing, Reid grabbed at her, revealing one shoe in his lap, a fuse leading into the shoe, and a lit match. He was unable to detonate the bomb: perspiration from his feet dampened the triacetone triperoxide (TATP) and prevented it from igniting.

Moutardier tried grabbing Reid twice, but he pushed her to the floor each time, and she screamed for help. When another flight attendant, Cristina Jones, arrived to try to subdue Reid, he fought her and bit her thumb.

The 6-foot-4-inch-tall (1.93 m) Reid, who weighed 215 pounds (98 kg), was subdued by the flight attendants and other passengers and immobilized by the cabin crew using plastic handcuffs, seatbelt extensions, and headphone cords. A doctor administered diazepam found in the flight kit of the aircraft. Many of the passengers only became aware of the situation when the pilot announced that the flight was to be diverted to Logan International Airport in Boston.

Two F-15 fighter jets escorted Flight 63 to Logan Airport. The plane parked in the middle of the runway, and Reid was arrested on the ground while the rest of the passengers were bussed to the main terminal. Authorities later found over 280 grams (10 ounces) of TATP and pentaerythritol tetranitrate (PETN) hidden in the hollowed soles of Reid's shoes, which, if detonated, would have blown a significant hole in the aircraft and likely caused it to crash. He pleaded guilty, and he was convicted, sentenced to three life terms plus 110 years without parole and incarcerated at ADX Florence, a supermax federal prison in Colorado.

== Aftermath ==
Six months after the crash of American Airlines Flight 587 in Queens, New York, on November 12, 2001, Mohammed Mansour Jabarah agreed to cooperate with American authorities in exchange for a reduced sentence. He said that fellow Canadian Abderraouf Jdey had been responsible for the flight's destruction, using a shoe bomb similar to that found on Reid several months earlier. However, it was revealed during the crash investigation that pilot error, not terrorism, brought down the plane. Jabarah was a known colleague of Khalid Sheikh Mohammed, and said that Reid and Jdey had both been enlisted by the al-Qaeda chief to participate in identical plots.

In 2006, security procedures at American airports were changed in response to this incident, with passengers required to remove their shoes before proceeding through scanners. The requirement was phased out for some travelers, particularly those with TSA PreCheck, in 2011. Also in 2011, the rules were relaxed to allow children 12 and younger and adults 75 and older to keep their shoes on during security screenings. On July 7, 2025, these rules were completely dropped at selected airports, before being scrapped entirely at all US airports the following day.

== See also ==
- Pan Am Flight 103, Pan Am plane destroyed by a PETN bomb, killing 270 people – event happened exactly 13 years prior to the shoe bombing incident
- Philippine Airlines Flight 434, test run for al-Qaeda Operation Bojinka, killing one plane passenger in bombing
- Bojinka plot, al-Qaeda plot to blow up twelve planes as they flew from Asia to the US
- Northwest Airlines Flight 253, failed al-Qaeda PETN bombing of plane
- 2006 transatlantic aircraft plot, failed plot to blow up at least ten planes as they flew from the UK to the US and Canada
- 2010 transatlantic aircraft bomb plot, failed al-Qaeda PETN bombing of plane
- List of terrorist incidents, 2001
- September 11 attacks
