= 2003 Marriott Hotel bombing =

Terrorist attack in Indonesia

2003 JW Marriott Hotel bombing
- The JW Marriott Jakarta hotel in 2021
- Location: Jakarta, Indonesia
- Date: 5 August 2003; 23 years ago 12:45 p.m. (UTC+7)
- Target: JW Marriott Jakarta
- Attack type: Suicide bombing, car bomb, terrorism
- Weapon: Car bomb
- Deaths: 13 (including the assailant)
- Injuries: 150
- Perpetrators: Jemaah Islamiyah; Al-Qaeda
- Assailant: Asmar Latin Sani

A suicide bomber detonated a car bomb outside the lobby of the JW Marriott Jakarta hotel on 5 August 2003, killing 12 people and injuring 150. Those killed included 11 Indonesians and one Dutch national. The hotel was viewed as a Western symbol, and had been used by the United States embassy for various events. The hotel was closed for five weeks and reopened to the public on 8 September 2003.

== Prelude ==
Two weeks prior to the bombing, there was a tip call to senior Indonesian police officers from a militant captured during a raid in Semarang that two carloads of bomb-making materials were heading to the capital, Jakarta. During the raid, the police also discovered some drawings outlining specific areas in the city for possible attacks.

== The explosion ==
A Toyota Kijang, bought on 20 July 2003, from an Indonesian businessman for 25.75 million rupiah was loaded with explosives and driven through the taxi stand in front of the JW Marriott Jakarta. The vehicle stopped briefly in front of the lobby and CCTV cameras show a security guard approaching the vehicle, briefly speaking to the driver. The security guard then turns and a detonation can be seen. It is still not clear if the explosion was accidental, set off by remote detonation or a timer exploding prematurely. If the vehicle had kept a course heading straight for the lobby the damage would undoubtedly have been more severe. The blast radius was visible along with the shattered windows of nearby buildings. According to Indonesian police, one of the ingredients in the car bomb contained the same chemical used in the deadly 2002 Bali bombings. The bombs in both cases were made of the same mixture of explosives, mobile phones were used as detonators, and the attackers had tried to scrape off the identification numbers from the vehicle bombs.

The severed head of Asmar Latin Sani, aged 28, and from West Sumatra, was later found on the fifth floor of the building, The head was identified by two jailed members of the Jemaah Islamiyah group who said they had recruited him.

Investigators uncovered the charred remains of a battery used to power the bomb and said it was similar to the ones used in a series of bombings against Christian churches on Christmas Eve 2000, in which 19 people were killed.

The attack came two days before a verdict in the trial of the Bali nightclub bombers. Al-Qaeda claimed responsibility for the attack and the perpetrators are known to have trained in al Qaeda training camps in Afghanistan and Pakistan.

== Investigation ==
On 11 August 2003—six days after the bombing—al-Qaeda claimed responsibility, via the Arab media Al Jazeera, and singled out Australia for special attention. The statement said

This operation is part of a series of operations that Dr Ayman al-Zawahiri has promised to carry out. [It is] a fatal slap on the face of America and its allies in Muslim Jakarta, where faith has been denigrated by the dirty American presence and the discriminatory Australian presence".

Jemaah Islamiyah (JI), an organisation affiliated with al-Qaeda, is alleged to have carried out the bombing. The al-Qaeda link has been backed by Indonesia's Minister of Defense, Matori Abdul Djalil who said the JW Marriott bombers had trained with al-Qaeda in Afghanistan and Pakistan. "Each one of them has special abilities received from training in Afghanistan and Pakistan," Matori Abdul Djalil said on 11 August 2003. He also claimed that the bombers were linked to a group of people arrested in the eastern Indonesian town of Semarang during July 2004 and are alleged to be members of Jemaah Islamiah.

There are many more Jemaah Islamiah members on the loose in Indonesia.... Because of this I am sure that JI is behind all of this.

On 5 May 2006 the International Crisis Group released its Asia Report No 114 entitled Terrorism in Indonesia. It described the events leading up the attack;

The trigger for the JW Marriott bombing came in December 2002, when Indonesian police stepped up the hunt for Jemaah Islamiyah members while investigating the 2002 Bali bombings. Toni Togar, a JI member based in Medan, North Sumatra, was nervous, because his house stored all the explosives left over from JI's 2000 Christmas Eve bombings. He contacted Noordin Mohammad Top to tell him he was going to throw them out. Noordin had been part of the team that carried out the Christmas Eve bombings which was led by Hambali and included Imam Samudra and many of the other 2002 Bali bombers. He told Togar to hold on as he "saw good materials being wasted".

Abu Bakar Bashir approved of Hambali's activities, and Toni Togar was selected to take part in the new bombing plot. Hambali had already set a precedent for a secret team pursuing jihad on its own. This was in part because he controlled the separate funding from al-Qaeda. In January 2003, Muhammad Rais, Noordin and Azahari Husin moved to Bengkulu, where a group of JI members lived, including Asmar Latin Sani, who became the JW Marriott suicide bomber. The next stages of the operation took place in February 2003 when the explosives were transported from Dumai to Bengkulu via Pekanbaru,

Azahari secured the detonators with a new team member, Masrizal bin Ali Umar, also known as Tohir, another Pondok Ngruki graduate and a Luqmanul Hakiem teacher who was a close friend of Rais. After the explosives safely reached Bengkulu as unaccompanied baggage on an intercity bus, they were stored at the house of Sardona Siliwangi, another Ngruki student and JI member. At the time, Sardona, who was working with Asmar Latin Sani, opened a bank account in March 2003 to facilitate financial transactions for Noordin.

In late April 2003, Mohamed Ihsan also known as Gembrot and Idris, who was involved in the 2000 Christmas Eve bombings transported the explosives again. In May, he and Toni Togar, robbed a bank in Medan on May 6 to raise funds for the project. "Ismail", a Luqmanul Hakiem student who had worked with Rais and Noordin in the shock absorber repair shop in Bukittinggi, then received an email from Noordin asking him to pick up some packages from a man in Dumai. Ismail obliged, and the package turned out to be cash in Australian dollars, sent by Hambali via a courier.

A book that appears based in part on transcripts of Hambali's interrogation says Hambali arranged for A$25,000 to be sent: A$15,000 for operational expenses, A$10,000 for Bali bomber families. Conboy, op. cit., p. 229. Hambali's younger brother, Rusman Gunawan, who was arrested in Karachi in September 2003, testified Hambali had secured a promise of A$50,000 from an Noordin on how to bring the cash from Dumai to Lampung.

On 4 June 2003, in Lampung, the final team was put together: Noordin, Azhari, Ismail, Asmar Latin Sani, and Tohir. Noordin assigned the tasks and explained that he was in charge, Azhari was field commander and Ismail his assistant. Asmar and Tohir would be in charge of renting the house, buying the vehicles and getting the explosives to Jakarta. Asmar had agreed to be the suicide bomber. When they got to Jakarta, they split into two teams to survey four possible targets. Azhari and Ismail examined the JW Marriott and a Citibank branch; Noordin and Tohir looked at the Jakarta International School and the Australian International School. Eventually they decided on the hotel because of the American brand name and the fact that it was easy to reach. The bombing took place on 5 August.

They all drove back to Blitar with 25 kilograms of potassium chlorate and ten kilos of sulfur for bomb making, as well as a pistol and ammunition. Not long afterwards, another operative delivered 30 extra kilograms of TNT.

Around this time a pamphlet was circulating in jihadist groups that was a translation from Arabic into Indonesian of an article that first appeared in the al-Qaeda on-line magazine Sawt al-Jihad. Entitled "You Don't Need to Go to Iraq for Jihad", it was written in 2003 by a Saudi jihadist, Muhammad bin Ahmad as-Salim.

== Suspects ==
- Riduan Isamuddin alias Hambali is being held at Guantanamo Bay detention camp, since his August 2003 arrest in Thailand. He is accused of masterminding the 2002 Bali bombings as well as the JW Marriott blast. According to interrogation reports, Hambali was undergoing plans to develop biological weapons, in particular anthrax. Hambali was al Qaeda's main connection in South East Asia, and was apparently trying to open an "Al Qaeda bio-weapons branch plant" in either Malaysia or Indonesia. He told investigators he had been "working on an Al Qaeda Anthrax program in Kandahar", Afghanistan.
- Azahari Husin, a former university lecturer, was also known as the "Demolition Man" because of his bomb-making skills, and used a mobile phone to detonate the JW Marriott bomb and included ingredients similar to other Indonesian blasts. According to Indonesian police, "If Azahari did not make the bomb, then its creator was following his manual."
- Noordin Mohammad Top was suspected of helping finance the Bali blast and helping build the JW Marriott bomb. Noordin is a Malaysian citizen.
- Muhammad Rais was convicted in May 2004 of violating anti-terrorism laws in connection with the attack. Rais transported the explosives from various towns to Jakarta, where they were used in the bomb. He was sentenced to seven years in prison for his role. "We saw the Marriott attack as a message from Osama bin Laden," Rais said at his trail.
- Rusman Gunawan alias "Gun Gun" was sentenced in October 2004 to four years jail for "facilitating and aiding terrorism". In particular he was found to have transferred the money (in Australian dollars) that was ultimately used to finance the JW Marriott bombing. He and six other Indonesian students were arrested during raids in Pakistan. He trained at the Al Ghuraba training camp in Afghanistan. In 2002 while he attended university in Pakistan, he took over as the "intermediary" for e-mail messages between al-Qaeda and Hambali, who at the time was hiding in Cambodia.
- Mohammed Nazir Bin Lep is one of Hambali's key lieutenants and like Hambali is being held at the Guantanamo Bay detention camp. He allegedly transferred the al Qaeda funds used for the bombing and knew of Jemaah Islamiah plots to launch attacks elsewhere in South East Asia. The CIA claims he was to be a suicide bomber for a "second wave" of al Qaeda attacks targeting Los Angeles.
- Gempur Angkoro alias Jabir, is al-Ghozi's cousin and was one of Top's most trusted men; he was killed in a raid on 29 April 2006. Jabir personally assembled the JW Marriott bomb, and the bombs used in the 2004 Jakarta embassy bombing. (Jakarta Post, 2 May)
- Sardona Siliwangi, was the first person to be sentenced for the JW Marriott attack. He had been "legally and convincingly" proven guilty of an act of terrorism, during his trial in the town of Bengkulu on the island of Sumatra, and sentenced to ten years in prison. Siliwangi had stored at his Bengkulu home, six cartons of explosives left by the suicide operative Asmar Latin Sani. The explosives were later moved to the South Sumatra town of Lubuk Linggau before being taken to Jakarta.
- Air Setyawan, Luthfi Haidaroh and Urwah were all arrested in the Central Java city of Surakarta on 26 July 2004 by Indonesia's Detachment 88 anti-terrorist squad, which is trained and equipped by the United States and Australia.
- Yazid Sufaat
- Majid Khan pled guilty in 2012 to taking part in the bombing.

== Al-Qaeda connection ==
Stuart A. Levey, the former Under Secretary for Terrorism and Financial Intelligence in the United States, believes that the 2002 Bali bombings, and the JW Marriott Hotel bombing were financed by smuggling $30,000 in cash for each attack from al-Qaeda to allied terrorists in Asia. By contrast, the 9/11 Commission estimated the September 11 attacks in 2001 cost between $400,000 and $500,000 over two years—at least some of which was deposited in foreign accounts and accessed by the plotters in the USA.

Then Vice President of the United States Dick Cheney said:

Hambali went to the training camps in Afghanistan that they ran back in the '90s, subsequently received funding from al Qaeda, went back then to Indonesia, and was behind some of the major attacks there. So you've got this sort of home-grown, but nonetheless affiliated, extremist operation going now in Indonesia. You'll find the same thing if you go to Morocco, where they had the attack in Casablanca; in Turkey, Istanbul, and so forth.

It was the simultaneous presence at al-Qaeda camps in Afghanistan by militants from across South East Asia that facilitated many of the personal relationships that exist between JI and members of other violent Islamist groups. These include the Moro Islamic Liberation Front, a secessionist movement fighting for a Muslim homeland in the southern Philippines, as well as several other Indonesian, Malaysian and Thai groups. The weight of evidence suggests that although some JI personnel might be inspired by the larger global mystique of figures such as Osama bin Laden, the South East Asian group remains operationally and organisationally distinct.

== Effects ==
The Jakarta Stock Exchange market index tumbled 3.1 per cent after the attack and its currency, the rupiah, lost as much as 2 per cent of its value against the US dollar.

Australia issued a warning for its citizens to avoid all international hotels in Jakarta after intelligence found the capital could be under the threat of further attacks.

== See also ==
- List of terrorist incidents
- 2002 Bali bombings
- 2004 Jakarta embassy bombing
- 2005 Bali bombings
- Islamabad Marriott Hotel bombing (2008)
- 2009 Jakarta bombings
- Christmas Eve 2000 Indonesia bombings
