= Asmar Latin Sani =

Indonesian terrorist

- Born: 21 October 1976; West Sumatra, Indonesia
- Died: 5 August 2003 (aged 26); Jakarta, Indonesia
- Cause of death: Suicide bombing
- Known for: 2003 Marriott Hotel bombing
- Allegiance: Jemaah Islamiyah; al-Qaeda

Details
- Date: 5 August 2003; 11.58 a.m. WIB (UTC+07:00)
- Locations: Mega Kuningan, South Jakarta, Indonesia
- Target: JW Marriott Jakarta
- Killed: 12
- Injured: 150
- Weapon: Car bomb

Asmar Latin Sani (21 October 1976 – 5 August 2003) was the suicide bomber from West Sumatra who detonated a car bomb outside the lobby of the JW Marriott Hotel in Jakarta, Indonesia. His severed head was later found on the fifth floor of the building.

Before the bombing, Azahari Husin stayed with Asmar Latin Sani, at his home in Bengkulu on the island of Sumatra, Indonesia.

On 5 May 2006, the International Crisis Group released a report entitled Terrorism in Indonesia. It described the events leading up the attack;

In January 2003, Rais, Noordin and Azahari moved to Bengkulu, where a group of JI members lived, including Asmar Latin Sani, who became the Marriott suicide bomber. Noordin and Azahari planned the bombing there as a way of putting the explosives to good use. JI members in Bengkulu, Lampung, and Riau were involved in some planning and logistical support but were not told the target. Interestingly, Noordin began to plan for a spectacular attack with some of the Bengkulu members just as others from their wakalah were taking part in a program to refresh their military skills, as a response to the exposure and arrests that followed the Bali bombings. For most of the top JI leadership, this was a time for training and consolidation – not new attacks. But Hambali had set the precedent of going off on his own, and Noordin followed it.

The next stages of the operation involved small teams with ties to one another beyond the JI affiliation. Getting the explosives from Dumai to Bengkulu via Pekanbaru, Riau, in February 2003 and securing additional materials such as detonators involved Noordin, Azahari, Rais, Toni Togar, and a new team member, Masrizal bin Ali Umar alias Tohir, another Ngruki alumnus and Luqmanul Hakiem teacher. He was a close friend of Rais and would have been trusted completely by the others.

After the explosives reached Bengkulu safely as unaccompanied baggage on an ordinary intercity bus, they were stored at the house of Sardona Siliwangi, another Ngruki student and JI member. At the time the Marriott plot was being hatched, Sardona, who lived in Bengkulu, was working with Asmar Latin Sani to set up a new Ngruki-like pesantren there, and it was he who opened a bank account in March 2003 to facilitate financial transactions for Noordin.

Asmar Latin Sani was a member of Laskar Khos, an Arabic phrase which means "special force", a group is that formed inside the al Qaeda-linked Jemaah Islamiyah group which is believed responsible multiple attacks across Indonesia, including the 2002 Bali bombings, the 2004 Jakarta embassy bombing and the 2005 Bali bombings.

A week after the Marriott attack al Qaeda claimed responsibility via the Arab media station Al Jazeera, saying;

This operation is part of a series of operations that Dr. Ayman al-Zawahiri has promised to carry out,...

...a fatal slap on the face of America and its allies in Muslim Jakarta, where faith has been denigrated by the dirty American presence and the discriminatory Australian presence.
