= Abu Dujana (Jemaah Islamiah) =

Military leader of Jemaah Islamiah

Abu Dujana (/ˈɑːbuː duːˈdʒɑːnə/ AH-boo doo-JAH-nə; born Ainul Bahri in Cianjur, West Java, 1968) was the military leader of Jemaah Islamiah from 2005 until June 2007, when he was arrested.

As of December 2007, he was facing trial in Jakarta on terrorism-related charges. He has allegedly played major roles in several terrorist bombings in South East Asia, including the 2003 Marriott Hotel bombing, which killed 12 people, and the 2004 Australian embassy bombing, which killed 11 people.

Abu Dujana is fluent in Arabic and English. He is thought to have traveled to Pakistan and Afghanistan, where he received weapons training in al-Qaeda training camps and fought with the mujahideen. He has also spent time in Malaysia in the 1990s, where he taught at an Islamic school in Johor and met Ali Ghufron, who was involved in the 2002 Bali bombings. Abu Dujana also met and provided shelter to Noordin Mohammed Top.

Abu Dujana became a JI leader following the death of bomb-maker Azahari Husin in 2005. He headed JI's military wing and was capable of assembling bomb and recruiting members. He allegedly procured and kept two caches of explosives for attacks against Christians and government workers in Poso, Central Sulawesi, Indonesia. Police seized the two caches of explosives.

He was arrested in June 2007 in Kebarongan, Banyumas, Central Java. As of December 2007, he was on trial on anti-terrorism charges including plotting terrorist activities and sheltering the perpetrators of the Bali bombings, and was facing the death penalty if convicted.
