= Fathur Rahman al-Ghozi =

Indonesian militant

- Born: 17 February 1971; Madiun, East Java, Indonesia
- Died: 12 October 2003 (aged 32); Pigcawayan, Cotabato, Philippines
- Citizenship: Indonesian
- Other names: Randy Alih, Sammy Sali Jamil, Rony Azad, Edris Anwar Rodin, Mike; Saad

Fathur Rahman al-Ghozi (17 February 1971 – 12 October 2003) was a key operative and bomb-maker of the Islamic militant Jemaah Islamiya group (JI). Al-Ghozi was accused of plotting and carrying out several terrorist attacks in the Philippines, Indonesia, and Singapore.

== Terrorist activities ==
Born in 1971 in East Java, Indonesia, Al-Ghozi became a member of JI. He had ties with Abu Bakar Bashir, the alleged spiritual head of Jemaah Islamiyah, having studied in Bashir's religious school in Solo, Central Java, Indonesia for six years, in late 1980s. He received military training at an al-Qaeda camp, including bomb-making instruction from Abu Khabab, along the border of Afghanistan and Pakistan. He then became a JI trainer, conducting bomb-making courses in Malaysia and the Philippines. He was also reported to be a member of Moro Islamic Liberation Front (MILF) special operations group, going by with another alias Randy Ali.

Al-Ghozi planned and financed the Rizal Day bombings, a series of bombing carried out by Jemaah Islamiya on 30 December 2000 that killed 22 people. In October 2001, under the instruction of JI leader Hambali, Al-Ghozi went to Singapore using a false Filipino passport to activate a JI's sleeper cell and direct the JI members to conduct reconnaissance and plan a series of bombings attacking United States and Western interests. Yazid Sufaat (q.v.) had acquired four tonnes of ammonium nitrate for the bombs. Among the intended targets were U.S. and Israeli Embassies, British and Australian High Commissions, and commercial buildings housing US firms. They planned to launch the attacks in December 2001/January 2002 or April/May 2002, but the plot was uncovered by authorities in December 2001.

== Arrest ==
Al-Ghozi was arrested in the Philippines on 15 January 2002, three hours before he was to board a plane from Manila to Bangkok for an arranged meeting with Riduan Isamuddin and other al-Qaeda and JI operatives. He pleaded guilty to charges of possession of illegal explosives in April 2002, and was sentenced to 17 years in jail. While in custody, he gave information that led investigators to a cache of more than a ton of explosives, 300 detonators and other bomb-making materials in the Southern Philippines. These items were recovered from a house rented by al-Ghozi in General Santos in Mindanao. Al-Ghozi confessed that he had provided the explosives used in the Rizal Day bombings, and had been planning to use the remaining explosives for the embassies attacks in Singapore.

== Escape and death ==
On 14 July 2003, al-Ghozi managed to escape from a high security facility inside Camp Crame, together with two other terrorist suspects belonging to the Abu Sayyaf group. The breakout led to a nationwide hunt for the fugitives in the Philippines. The government posted a reward of 10 million pesos for information on his whereabouts.

On 12 October 2003, it was reported that al-Ghozi was killed during a police shootout in Mindanao. According to reports, the authorities received a tip that al-Ghozi was travelling near Pigkawayan. A military checkpoint was set up, but the jeep transporting al-Ghozi rammed through the roadblock and a gun battle ensued. Soldiers shot al-Ghozi while he was attempting to detonate a hand grenade; he died on the way to a nearby clinic.

== See also ==
Terrorist activities

- Rizal Day bombings
- Singapore embassies attack plot

Associates

- Riduan Isamuddin (Hambali)
- Abu Bakar Bashir
