= Indonesian Mujahedeen Council =

Organisation of Indonesian Islamist groups

- Majelis Mujahidin Indonesia
- Abbreviation: MMI
- Formation: August 2000
- Founder: Abu Bakar Bashir
- Type: Umbrella Islamist organisation
- Legal status: Designated foreign terrorist organisation by the United States (13 June 2017)
- Headquarters: Indonesia
- Region served: Indonesia
- Affiliations: Jemaah Islamiyah (founder’s former group)

The Indonesian Mujahedeen Council (MMI; Indonesian: Majelis Mujahidin Indonesia) is an umbrella organisation of Islamist groups in Indonesia. The group was designated as foreign terrorist organization by the United States on 13 June 2017.

MMI was founded by Abu Bakar Bashir, the former leader of Jemaah Islamiyah. Known members include Muhammad Iqbal alias Abu Jibril who has called for people to "Destroy America and its allies! Kill those who desecrate Islam!" at a public rally in May 2005. In response to the execution of Saddam Hussein in 2006, Fauzan Al Anshori said George W. Bush should also stand trial. "Given the crimes blamed on Saddam, it is unfair if George Bush is not also put before an international tribunal," he said. "Saddam was executed for killing 148 people, Iraqi Shi'a Muslims, while Bush is responsible for the killing of about 600,000 Iraqis since the March 2003 invasion."

In December 2007, it was reported that MMI members were involved in attacks on several Ahmadiyah mosques in Indonesia. The attacks were motivated by a fatwa issued a month earlier by Indonesian Council of Ulama (MUI) against heresy. In August 2008, Abu Bakar Bashir resigned his position as the Council's supreme leader, charging that the group's internal democratic structure contradicted Islam, and stated that he should have absolute power within the organization.

However, in contrast to these aggressive acts, the Majelis Mujahideen Indonesia established a command post at the Iskandar Muda Air Force Base in Banda Aceh city to help with humanitarian efforts during the 2004 Indian Ocean earthquake.

When liberal Canadian Muslim activist Irshad Manji visited the Institute for Islamic and Social Studies in Yogyakarta to launch her book Allah, Liberty and Love in May 2012, hundreds of the group's supporters attacked the event, injuring her slightly, along with her assistant, while beating dozens of other people.

== See also ==
- Mujahedeen
- Mutaween
- Sharia
