= Abdullah Sungkar =

Indonesian terrorist (1937–1999)

Abdullah Sungkar (1937 – 20 October 1999) founded and led Jemaah Islamiyah, an Islamist terrorist and separatist organization. He was of Hadhrami Arab descent.

== See also ==
- Abu Bakar Ba'asyir
