= 1985 Borobudur bombing =

Terrorist attack in a Buddhist temple

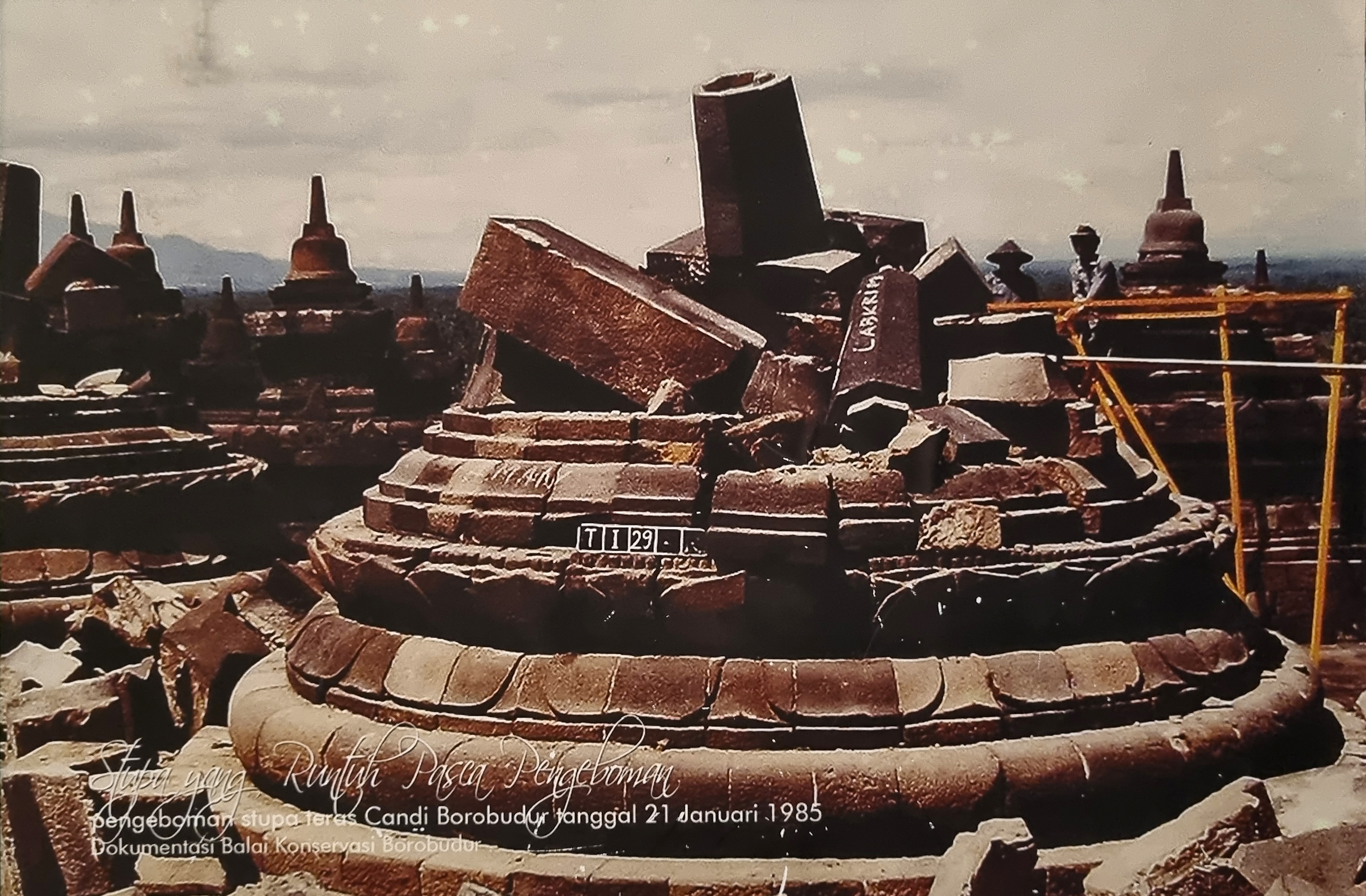
- The damage of several stupas of Borobudur upper terraces caused by Borobudur Bombing terrorist attack on 21 January 1985

- Magelang (Java) Magelang (Indonesia)
- Location: Magelang, Central Java, Indonesia
- Date: 21 January 1985; 41 years ago (UTC + 7)
- Target: Borobudur Temple
- Attack type: Bombing; terrorist attack
- Deaths: 0
- Injuries: 0
- Perpetrators: Ibrahim Djawad; Abdulkadir Ali Al-Habsyi; Husein Ali Al Habsyi
- Motive: Retaliation for the Tanjung Priok massacre

Nine bombs were detonated at the Borobudur Buddhist temple located in Magelang, Central Java, Indonesia, on 21 January 1985. There were no human casualties in this attack; however, nine stupas on the upper levels sustained heavy damage.

== Background ==
After Indonesia’s invitation to UNESCO in 1967 to assess the condition of Borobudur, a UNESCO team conducted a site survey in 1968 and recommended funds, expertise and equipment for restoring the monument. The UNESCO-led restoration campaign from 1973 to 1983 was completed with financial and technical assistance from different countries. The UNESCO restoration project elevated Borobudur’s global significance and was described by President Suharto as not just an Indonesian monument but also a treasure for all humanity.

The restoration took place within the context of Suharto’s New Order regime, which proclaimed Borobudur as a national cultural monument and restricted its use as an active religious site. Reframed as a national monument and international tourist attraction, the government established control over the site by building enclosures and reconfiguring the layout of space as part of a broader strategy to foster nationalism and modernization.

During this period, the New Order government addressed ideological threats such as Communism and militant Islam by reinforcing Indonesia’s state philosophy, Pancasila, promoting it as a unifying form of nationalism. The government faced significant religious pressures, notably from Islamic leaders who criticized the imposition of Pancasila as the sole ideological foundation for all organisations, viewing it as the marginalization of Islam.

The Borobudur bombing occurred against a backdrop of rising religious tensions in Indonesia, with the government cracking down on Islamic radicalism. With transnational Islamic movements gaining strength, the New Order regime considered Islamic radicalism as a threat because it presented an ideological alternative to the secular state’s authority.

Just months before the bombing, there was an incident at Tanjung Priok, where military personnel opened fire at Muslim demonstrators outside a mosque in Jakarta in September 1984. Local mosque officials had been arrested for refusing to take down banners critical of the government, and demonstrators were protesting their release. The unrest that followed resulted in rioters being gunned down. Official figures put the number of fatalities at 24, although unofficial estimates were higher. There was widespread anger from this incident, and political tensions intensified in Indonesia in late 1984.

== Incident ==
On 21 January 1985, starting from 01:30 WIB (UTC+07:00) and ending at 03:30, a series of nine explosions was heard at Borobudur Temple. A total of 13 explosives were planted: four on the upper terrace, five on the second terrace and four on the third terrace after the perpetrators arrived at the temple around 20:00 WIB on 20 January. The bombs were timed to detonate around 5 hours later.

Eventually, nine bombs exploded, and two were defused by the bomb disposal team which arrived at 05:30. Another two were discovered on 15 February.

The surrounding community heard the explosions and felt the shockwaves. Security personnel at Borobudur contacted the authorities. While no injuries were reported, authorities observed heavy damage to nine stupas which collapsed. Several Buddha statues were damaged and found broken among scattered stone rubble.

== Government and international response ==
No group claimed responsibility immediately, although authorities suspected Muslim extremists were involved.

On the same day, Suharto denounced the attack, framing it as an affront not only to Indonesian national pride but also to world heritage. Suharto’s response secularized the incident by emphasizing Borobudur’s role as “a national, even a world monument”, instead of acknowledging its religious significance. This strategic framing enabled the government to condemn religious extremists while positioning Borobudur as a neutral heritage site of global importance.

In light of how the Indonesian state had situated Borobudur culturally and politically, and the role of the international community in its recent 1983 restoration, the bombing incident drew international attention and concern, with UNESCO offering support for its restoration.

The Tanjung Priok incident had earlier given the government reason to crack down on Islamic radicalism, leading to arrests of outspoken religious leaders, politicians and hardliners. As the perpetrators of the Borobudur bombing were reportedly acting in retaliation for Tanjung Priok, the attack created a cycle of religious tension that in turn enabled the government to justify vigilance against religious extremism.

== Investigation and arrests ==
Around two months of investigation did not see conclusive results, with the authorities interrogating around 50 people who were eventually released due to insufficient evidence. A breakthrough came when an explosion occurred on a Pemudi Express Bus in Banyuwangi and resulted in the arrest of Abdulkadir Ali Al-Habsyi who provided the key to the unravelling of the network of perpetrators, which included Achmad Muladawila and Abdulkadir Braja who were subsequently arrested. Authorities also identified Husein Ali Al Habsyi and Ibrahim Djawad as key figures in the attack.

The perpetrators’ motivations for the attack included revenge for the killing of Muslim protestors in Tanjung Priok and opposition to the government’s enforcement of Pancasila. It is believed that the militants saw Borobudur as a symbol of kufr ("disbelief") and idolatry, attacking it to defy the government for making it a national monument. Indeed, Ibrahim Djawad had said during a lecture that the government deliberately carried out the restoration of Borobudur to "compete with the purity of Islam".

Abdulkadir Ali Al-Habsyi and Achmad Muladawila were each sentenced to 20 years in prison, while Abdulkadir Braja received 13 years. Husein Ali Al Habsyi was sentenced to life imprisonment, but was granted clemency by President B. J. Habibie and released in 1999. Meanwhile, Ibrahim Djawad was among those who escaped arrest by going abroad.

== See also ==
- List of Islamist terrorist attacks
