= Abu Bakar Ba'asyir =

Senior Indonesian Islamic figure (born 1938)

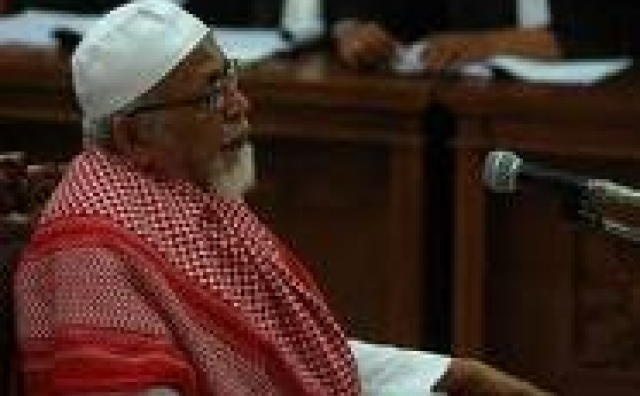
- Ba'asyir in 2011
- Born: 17 August 1938 (age 88); Jombang Regentschap, Surabaya Residency, Midden Java Gouvernement, Dutch East Indies
- Status: Released 8 January 2021
- Criminal charge: Terrorism
- Penalty: 15 years in imprisonment

Abu Bakar Ba'asyir (Note: /ˈɑːbuː ˈbɑːkər bɑːˈʃɪər/ AH-boo BAH-kər bah-SHEER; Arabic: أبو بكر باعشير, romanized: ʾAbū Bakr Bāʿašīr; Indonesian pronunciation: [abuˌbakar baˈʔaʃɪr]; Arabic pronunciation: [əˌbuˈbɛkər ba:ʕaɕir]) (born 17 August 1938), also known as Abu Bakar Bashir, Abdus Somad, and Ustad Abu ("Teacher Abu") is a senior Indonesian Islamic and mujahideen figure who was the leader of Jamaah Ansharut Tauhid and Jemaah Islamiyah.

He ran the Al-Mukmin boarding school in Ngruki, Sukoharjo Regency, Central Java, which he co-founded with Abdullah Sungkar in 1972. He was in exile in Malaysia for 17 years during the secular New Order administration of President Suharto resulting from various activities, including urging the implementation of Sharia law.

Intelligence agencies and the United Nations claim he is the spiritual head of Jemaah Islamiyah (also known as JI), best known for the 2002 Bali bombings and which has links with Al-Qaeda. In August 2014, he publicly pledged allegiance to Abu Bakr al-Baghdadi, leader of the Islamic State of Iraq and the Levant (ISIL) and his declaration of a caliphate.

== Early life, resistance to Suharto, and exile ==
Bashir was born in Jombang on 17 August 1938, to a family of Hadhrami Arab and Javanese descent.

During Indonesian President Suharto's New Order, Bashir and Sungkar were arrested for a number of reasons, firstly for actively supporting Sharia, the non-recognition of the Indonesian national ideology Pancasila which in part promotes religious pluralism. Secondly, the refusal of their school to salute the Indonesian flag which signified Bashir's continual refusal to recognise the authority of a secular Indonesian state. Bashir appealed but was subsequently imprisoned without trial from 1978 to 1982. Soon after his release, Bashir was convicted on similar charges; he was also linked to the bomb attack on the Buddhist temple Borobudur in 1985 but fled to Malaysia. During his years in exile Bashir undertook religious teachings in both Malaysia and Singapore. The United States government alleged that during this period he became involved with Jemaah Islamiyah, a militant Islamist group. Bashir remained in exile until Indonesian President Suharto's fall in 1998.

Bashir returned to Indonesia in 1999 and became a cleric, renewing his call for Sharia law. Ba'asyir has two sons—Abdul Roshid Ridyo Ba'asyir, born 31 January 1974 in Sukobarjo, Central Java, Indonesia; and Abdul Rahim Ba'asyir, born 16 November 1977 in Surakarta, Central Java, Indonesia, and a daughter, Zulfur.

== Bali bombings, trial, and imprisonment ==
In June 2002, the U.S. government asked Indonesia to turn over Omar Al-Faruq, a member of al-Qaeda and a suspect of terrorist attacks and car bombings. Megawati Sukarnoputri's administration captured Al-Faruq and transferred him to American custody, and he was subsequently held in Bagram prison in Afghanistan.

Similarly, US State Department translator Fred Burks revealed during Bashir's trial in Indonesia that the USA government had asked President Megawati secretly to hand over Bashir in a meeting at Megawati's home in September 2002. Present at that meeting was US ambassador to Indonesia Ralph L. Boyce, National Security Council official Karen Brooks, and an unnamed CIA official.

Megawati refused to transfer Bashir saying, "I can't render somebody like him. People will find out".

On April 14, 2003, he was formally charged by the Indonesian government with treason, immigration violations, and providing false documents and statements to the Indonesian police. The charges are mainly related to the 2000 Christmas Eve bombings against Christian churches, which killed 18 people. In the Indonesian court, he was found not guilty of treason because the state failed to prove its case, but was found guilty on the immigration violations. In a local TV news interview, Metro TV, when asked, 'Are you truly a terrorist?'; He simply answered, 'No, I've never killed anyone.' He was sentenced to three years in prison, but the sentence was subsequently reduced to 20 months due to his good behavior in the prison.

On October 15, 2004, he was arrested by the Indonesian authorities and charged with involvement in the bomb attack on the Marriott Hotel in Jakarta on August 5, 2003, which killed 14 people. Secondary charges in the same indictment charge him of involvement in the 2002 Bali bombing, the first time he has faced charges in relation to that attack which killed 202 people and considered Indonesia's deadliest terrorist attack. On March 3, 2005, Bashir was found guilty of conspiracy over the 2002 attacks, but was found not guilty of the charges surrounding the 2003 bombing. He was sentenced to two and a half years imprisonment.

== Remission and release ==
On August 17, 2005, as part of the tradition of remissions for Indonesia's Independence Day, Bashir's jail term was cut by 4 months and 15 days. On June 14, 2006, to cheers from his supporters waiting outside, Abu Bakar Bashir was released, having served 25+ months in Jakarta's Cipinang prison, where he held court and coordinated the publication of a commemorative book with his release. About forty bodyguards in uniform black jackets linked arms to escort Bashir through chanting crowds.

After returning to the boarding school for which he is the spiritual leader, he pledged a renewed campaign to impose Islamic sharia law on Indonesia. He also called Australian Prime Minister, John Howard, to convert to Islam in order to save him from hell and receive God's forgiveness. Howard said that Australians would be "extremely disappointed, even distressed" at the news of the release. In August 2006, Bashir claimed that the 2002 Bali bombs were replaced by the American CIA with a "micro-nuclear" weapon. He also claimed the original bombs were only intended to injure people, not kill them - despite the bombers' own admissions and public testimony. In answer to one reporter's question as to what the West and the United States can do to make the world safer, Bashir replied, "They have to stop fighting Islam. That's impossible because it is sunnatullah [destiny, a law of nature], as Allah has said in the Qur'an. If they want to have peace, they have to accept to be governed by Islam."

On December 21, 2006, Bashir's conviction was overturned by Indonesia's Supreme Court. He publicly criticised the United Nations because he remained on the body's list of international terrorists, saying "I am terrorist number 35 on the list."

In October 2008, Bashir announced he intends to start a new Islamic group in Indonesia, JAT or Jamaah Ansharut Tauhid ("partisans of the oneness of God"), at the time the Indonesian government was preparing to execute the three Bali bombers. Bashir repeated his claim that a nuclear device was released by the CIA, saying the attack was conspiracy between "America, Australia and the Jews" In February 2012, the US Department of State website stated that JAT was responsible for multiple coordinated attacks against innocent civilians, police and military personnel in Indonesia. "JAT has robbed banks and carried out other illicit activities to fund the purchase of assault weapons, pistols and bomb-making materials", so JAT is put on US terror list.

== 2010 arrest and conviction ==
On December 13, 2010, Indonesian police charged Bashir with involvement in plans of terror and military training in Aceh. The charge against him of inciting others to commit terrorism, carries the death penalty.

In February 2011, Bashir denied the charges of terrorism against him.

=== Conviction ===
On June 16, 2011, Bashir was convicted of supporting a jihadi training camp following a four-month trial. He was sentenced to 15 years in prison. He was acquitted of the charge of involvement in the 2002 Bali bombings. However, after an appeal the Jakarta High Court reduced his sentence to nine years. Finally, the Supreme Court has rejected the appeal of Abu Bakar Bashir and annulled the Jakarta High Court sentence then reinstated the South Jakarta District Court's original 15-year sentence.

=== Imprisonment and release ===
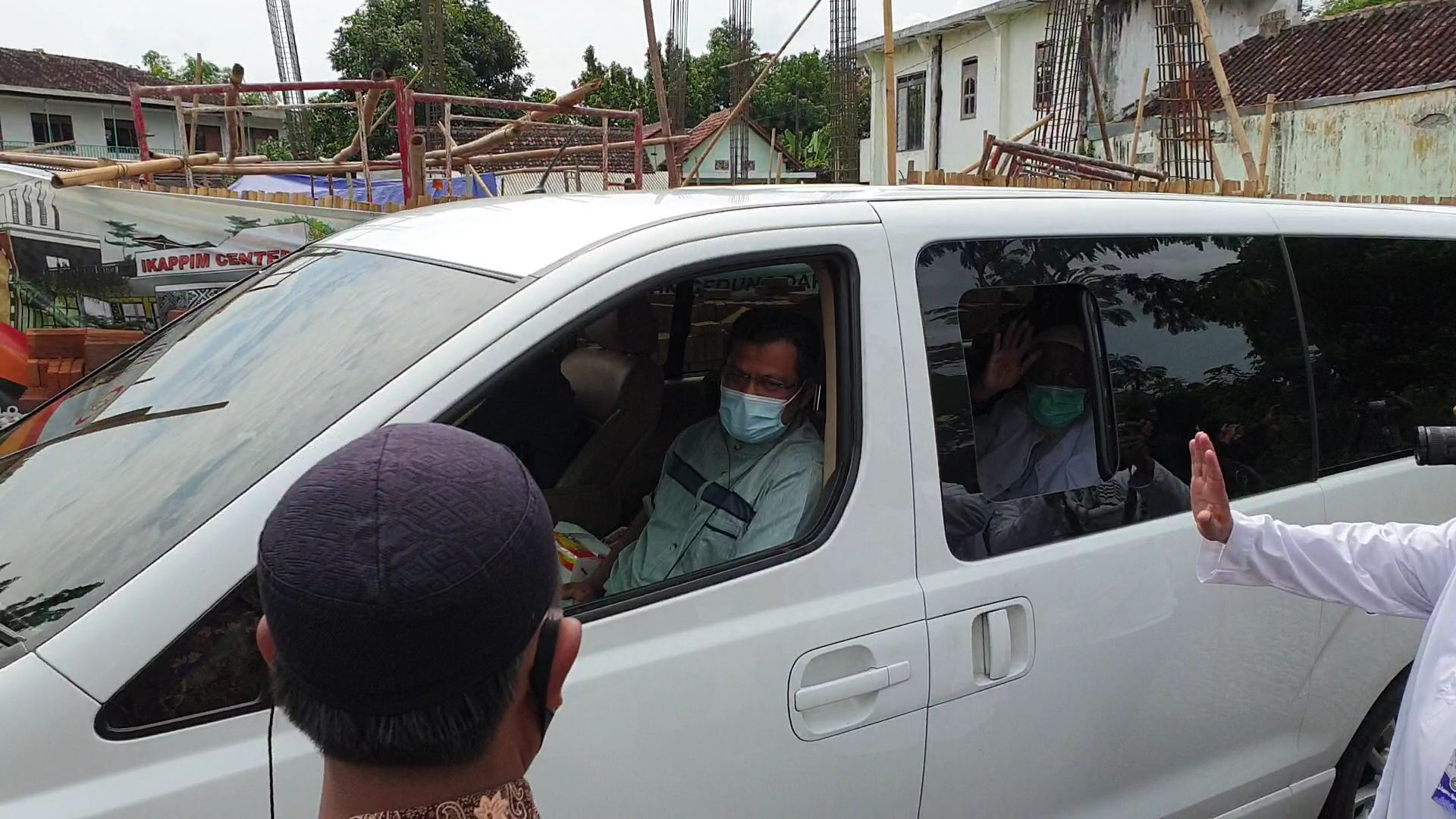
Abu Bakar Ba'asyir (center) accompanied by his son, Abdulrohim (front, wearing blue) upon arrival at Pondok Pesantren Al Mukmin Ngruki in Sukoharjo, Central Java

In January 2019 it was rumored that president Joko Widodo was considering the release of Bashir due to old age and declining health. The move was seen as controversial in Indonesia as part of a growing number of actions taken by Widodo to appease Indonesia's conservative Muslims ahead of the 2019 presidential election. However, on January 23, after pressure from Australia and the families of victims of the Bali bombing, the move to release Bashir was cancelled as he refused to pledge allegiance to the state ideology of Pancasila which was one of the terms of his release.

While in prison, Bashir received 55 months of sentence reductions. In 2014, he reportedly pledged allegiance to Abu Bakr al-Baghdadi, the leader of the Islamic State of Iraq and the Levant.

On January 8, 2021, Bashir was released from a Jakarta prison at the conclusion of his sentence. Indonesian authorities said that he would be entered into a deradicalisation programme.

== Views and controversies ==
Abu Bakar Bashir has been described as the ideological godfather of Jemaah Islamiyah, even though no evidence has been made public that specifically implicates Bashir in terrorist attacks undertaken by the clandestine group. He has claimed that Jemaah Islamiyah doesn't exist and that the Central Intelligence Agency (CIA) and Israel were behind terror attacks in Indonesia including the 2002 Bali bombings After open confessions from the bombers, Bashir claimed in August 2006 that the Bali bombs were "replaced" by a "micro-nuclear" weapon by the CIA. Bashir has expressed sympathy for Osama bin Laden and Saddam Hussein, but that he didn't "agree with all of their actions," in particular "total war." He further stated "...If this occurs in an Islamic country, the fitnah [discord] will be felt by Muslims. But to attack them in their country [America] is fine." He has claimed the 9/11 attacks were a false flag attack by America and Israel as a pretext to attack Muslims in Afghanistan and Iraq.

In a speech following the Bali attacks Bashir stated, "I support Osama bin Laden's struggle because his is the true struggle to uphold Islam." The Indonesian Islamic cleric is portrayed strongly in Western media as an extremist who inspires deadly actions.

He has stated his belief that Indonesia must adhere to Sharia law and has renewed his calls for an Islamic state in Indonesia.

There is no nobler life than to die as a martyr for jihad. None. The highest deed in Islam is Jihad. If we commit to Jihad, we can neglect other deeds, even fasting and prayer.*

He founded the Indonesian Mujahedeen Council (MMI), a coalition of Islamist groups promoting the implementation of Islamic law in Indonesia. In August 2008, Bashir resigned his position as the council's supreme leader, charging that the groups internal democratic structure contradicted Islam, and stated that he should have absolute power within the organization.

Controversy surrounding Abu Bakar Bashir heightened in early 2008 after a sermon given by the cleric in late 2007. Bashir allegedly refers to tourists in Bali as "worms, snakes and maggots" with specific reference to the immorality of Australian infidels. Bashir states,

The young must be first at the front line, don't hide at the back. You must be at the front, dies as martyrs and all your sins will be forgiven. This is how to achieve forgiveness...

As described by Natasha Robinson, Bashir has returned to his hardline rhetoric. His early release from prison has been described as the catalyst to his revitalised, hardline approach towards non-Muslims. Bashir's view on non-Muslims is highlighted in this statement made in East Java in 2006, "God willing, there are none here, if there were infidels here, just beat them up. Do not tolerate them." Bashir's specific mention of Australian tourists has created uproar among government officials and the Australian media regarding the cleric's intolerant comments. Australia's Foreign Affairs Minister Stephen Smith views Bashir's comments in late 2007 as being full of the intolerance that has marked many of Bashir's previous speeches.

The cleric has also previously warned of severe retribution if the Bali bombers, who killed 202 people in 2002, be executed by firing squad. On March 24, 2008 the bombers, who were on death row, lost almost any hope of escaping the death penalty as their lawyer, Fahmi Bachmid, withdrew from their last appeal. The Bali bombers were executed by firing squad at 12:15 am on 9 November 2008.

In July 2014, an imprisoned Bashir pledged allegiance, or Bay'ah, to the militant Islamic State of Iraq and the Levant (ISIL) and its leader, Abu Bakr al-Baghdadi.

== Release ==
On January 8, 2021, he was released from prison, nearly 20 years since the day of the attack.

== Subsequent acknowledgement of Pancasila ==
On 1 August 2022, a video went viral to the public. In the video, Bashir acknowledged his wrongs and apparently acknowledging Pancasila as the national ideology after years of disavowing it. His son, Abdul Rochim acknowledged that the video is original and was made 3 to 4 months prior to going viral. His son claimed that Bashir already accepted Pancasila but did not agree with groups or teachings that clashed Pancasila with Islam. However in 20 August 2022, he changed his mind and said that while he agreed on the first principle of Pancasila’s “Belief in the Almighty God”, he expressed his rejection of those who did not use ‘Godly’ laws as the form of the country’s governance and neglected the use of non-religious ‘man made’ laws in a system of democracy. He further added that Indonesia is a 'taghut country'. The 'Thaghut country' is a state that does not follow Allah's orders. He said that since Sukarno's time, the law of monotheism had been discarded in Indonesia. What is enforced in Indonesia is the law of shirk, namely democracy. "What we have to do now is work hard to make Indonesia implement Islamic law because Indonesia is actually supposed to be an Islamic state. But successive governments have not been willing to implement it," the cleric said.
