= Jemaah Islamiyah =

Southeast Asian salafist organization (1993–2024)

- Jihadist flag and Indonesia Islamic State flag used by Jemaah Islamiyah
- Leaders: Abdullah Sungkar (1993–1999) †; Abu Bakar Baasyir (1999–2003) (Imprisoned, later released); Abu Rusdan (2003–2004)(Imprisoned, later released); Adung (2004–2005)(Imprisoned, later released); Zarkasih (2005–2007)(Imprisoned, later released); Para Wijayanto (2008–2018) (Imprisoned, later released)
- Dates active: 1993–2024
- Country: Indonesia
- Allegiance: (al-Qaeda) Al-Qaeda; Afghanistan
- Active regions: Australia; Southeast Asia: Brunei; East Timor; Indonesia; Malaysia; Philippines; Singapore; Thailand
- Ideology: Islamism; Islamic fundamentalism Islamic extremism Pan-Islamism; Salafism; Salafi Jihadism; Wahhabism; Anti-Australian sentiment Anti-Christian sentiment Anti-Zionism
- Size: 6,000 (2021)

Jemaah Islamiyah (Note: Other transliterations include Jemaa Islamiyah, Jema'a Islamiyya, Jema'a Islamiyyah, Jema'ah Islamiyah, Jema'ah Islamiyyah, Jemaa Islamiya, Jemaa Islamiyya, Jemaah Islamiyya, Jemaa Islamiyyah, Jemaah Islamiyyah, Jemaah Islamiyyah, Jemaah Islamiya, Jamaah Islamiyah, Jamaa Islamiya, Jama'ah Islamiyah and Al-Jama'ah al-Islamiyyah.) (Arabic: الجماعة الإسلامية, al-Jamāʿah al-Islāmiyyah, meaning "Islamic Congregation", frequently abbreviated JI) was an Indonesian-based Islamist militant group founded in 2002 , which was dedicated to the establishment of an Islamic state in Southeast Asia. On 25 October 2002, immediately following the JI-perpetrated 2002 Bali bombings, JI was added to the UN Security Council Resolution 1267.

JI was a transnational organization with cells in Indonesia, Singapore, Malaysia, and the Philippines. In addition to al-Qaeda, the group is also alleged to have links to the Moro Islamic Liberation Front and Jamaah Ansharut Tauhid, a splinter cell of the JI which was formed by Abu Bakar Baasyir on 27 July 2008. The group has been designated as a terrorist group by the United Nations, Australia, Canada, China, Japan, the United Kingdom and the United States. It remained very active in Indonesia where it publicly maintained a website as of January 2013.

In October 2021, the Director of Identification and Socialization of Detachment 88 Muhammad Sodiq said that 876 members of Jamaah Islamiyah had been arrested and sentenced in Indonesia.

On 16 November 2021, the Indonesian National Police launched a crackdown operation, which revealed that the group operated in disguise as a political party, the Indonesian People's Da'wah Party. The revelation shocked the public, as it was the first time in Indonesia that a terrorist organization disguised itself as a political party and attempted to intervene and participate in the Indonesian political system.

== History ==
JI has its roots in Darul Islam (DI, meaning "House of Islam"), a radical Islamist/anti-colonialist movement in Indonesia in the 1940s.

Bashir and Sungkar were both imprisoned by the New Order administration of Indonesian president Suharto as part of a crackdown on radical groups such as Komando Jihad, that were perceived to undermine the government's control over the Indonesian population. The two leaders spent several years in prison. After release, Bashir and his followers moved to Malaysia in 1982. They recruited people from Indonesia, Malaysia, Singapore, and the Philippines. The group officially named itself Jemaah Islamiyah around that time period.

JI was formally founded on 1 January 1993, by JI leaders, Abu Bakar Bashir and Abdullah Sungkar while hiding in Malaysia from the persecution of the Suharto government. After the fall of the Suharto regime in 1998, both men returned to Indonesia where JI gained a terrorist edge when one of its founders, the late Sungkar, established contact with Osama bin Laden's al-Qaeda network.

JI's violent operations began during the communal conflicts in Maluku and Poso. It shifted its attention to targeting U.S. and Western interests in Indonesia and the wider Southeast Asian region since the start of the U.S.-led war on terror. JI's terror plans in Southeast Asia were exposed when its plot to set off several bombs in Singapore was foiled by the local authorities.

In 2004, Abu Bakar Bashir created the Indonesian Mujahedeen Council to connect Islamist groups, including JI, in Indonesia.

Recruiting, training, indoctrination, financial, and operational links between the JI and other militant groups, such as al-Qaeda, the Abu Sayyaf Group (ASG), the Misuari Renegade/Breakaway Group (MRG/MBG) and the Philippine Rajah Sulaiman movement (RSM) have existed for many years.

Bashir became the spiritual leader of the group while Hambali became the military leader. Unlike the Al-Mau'nah group, Jemaah Islamiyah kept a low profile in Malaysia and their existence was publicized only after the 2002 Bali bombings. It is suspected by some to be linked to al-Qaeda or the Taliban.

=== Designation as a terrorist group ===
Jemaah Islamiyah was designated a terrorist group by the following countries and international organizations:

- Argentina
- Australia
- Bahrain
- Canada
- European Union
- Japan
- Malaysia
- New Zealand
- United Kingdom
- United Nations
- United States

Prior to the 2002 Bali bombings, there was underestimation to the threat Jemaah Islamiyah posed. After the attack, the U.S. State Department designated Jemaah Islamiyah as a Foreign Terrorist Organization.

=== Other terrorist attacks ===
In 2003, Indonesian police confirmed the existence of "Mantiqe-IV", the JI regional cell which covered Irian Jaya and Australia. Indonesian police said Muklas has identified Mantiqe IV's leader as Abdul Rahim—an Indonesian-born Australian. Jemaah Islamiyah is also strongly suspected of carrying out the 2003 JW Marriott hotel bombing, the 2004 Australian embassy bombing, the 2005 Bali bombings and the 2009 JW Marriott and Ritz-Carlton hotel bombings. The Bali and JW Marriott attacks showed that JI did not rule out attacking the same target more than once. The JI also has been directly and indirectly involved in dozens of bombings in the southern Philippines, usually in league with the ASG.

A bomb manual published by the Jemaah Islamiyah was used in the 2002 Bali bombings, the 2003 Marriott Hotel bombing, the 2000 Philippine consulate bombing in Jakarta, the 2000 Jakarta Stock Exchange bombing, and the 2000 Christmas Eve bombings.

However, most of Jemaah Islamiyah prominent figures such as Hambali, Abu Dujana, Zarkasih, Noordin M. Top and Dulmatin have either been captured or killed, mostly by Indonesian anti-terrorist squad, Detachment 88. While several of its former leaders, including Malaysian Islamic extremist and Afghanistan War veteran Nasir Abbas, have renounced violence and even assisted the Indonesian and Malaysian governments in the war on terrorism. Nasir Abbas was Noordin Top's former trainer.

Indonesian investigators revealed the JI's establishment of a hit squad in April 2007, which was established to target top leaders who oppose the group's objectives, as well as other officials, including police officers, government prosecutors and judges handling terrorism-related cases.

In April 2008, the South Jakarta District Court declared JI an illegal organisation when sentencing former leader Zarkasih and military commander Abu Dujana to 15 years on terrorism charges.

In 2010, Indonesian authorities cracked down on the Jemaah Islamiyah network in Aceh. Between February and May 2010, more than 60 militants were captured. This Aceh network was established by Dulmatin sometime after 2007 when he returned to Indonesia.

== Naming ==
The name Jemaah Islamiyah roughly translates to "Islamic Community" in English and is abbreviated as "JI". To counter the recruitment efforts by the group, Islamic scholars in Indonesia and the Philippines who were critical of the group suggested it be called Jemaah Munafiq (JM) instead, translated as "Hypocrites' Community".

== Activities ==
=== 2000 ===
On 12 March 2000, 3 JI members were arrested in Manila carrying plastic explosives in their luggage. One of them was later jailed for 17 years.

On 1 August, Jemaah Islamiyah attempted to assassinate the Philippine ambassador to Indonesia, Leonides Caday. The bomb detonated as his car entered his official residence in central Jakarta, killing two people and injuring 21 others, including the ambassador.

On 13 September, a car bomb exploded in a packed parking deck beneath the Jakarta Stock Exchange building, killing 15 people and injuring 20.

On 24 December, JI took part in a major coordinated bombings of churches in Jakarta and eight other cities in Indonesia.

On 30 December, in a series of bombings that occurred around Metro Manila in the Philippines, 22 died and over a hundred were injured.

=== 2001 ===
On 8 December 2001, a raid by Singaporean authorities successfully foiled a plot by JI to bomb several foreign embassies in Singapore. The plot also revealed several bombing locations, which included the water pipeline between Malaysia and Singapore, and also an MRT station, where Americans frequently traveled.

=== 2002 ===
On 5 June 2002, Indonesian authorities arrested Kuwaiti Omar al-Faruq. Handed over to the U.S. authorities, he subsequently confesses he is a senior al-Qaeda operative sent to Southeast Asia to orchestrate attacks against U.S. interests. He reveals to investigators detailed plans of a new terror spree in Southeast Asia.

After many warnings by U.S. authorities of a credible terrorist threat in Jakarta, on 23 September, a grenade exploded in a car near the residence of a U.S. embassy official in Jakarta, killing one of the attackers.

On 26 September, the U.S. State Department issued a travel warning urging Americans and other Westerners in Indonesia to avoid locations such as bars, restaurants, and tourist areas.

On 2 October, a U.S. soldier and two Filipinos were killed in a JI nail-bomb attack outside a bar in the southern Philippine city of Zamboanga.

On 10 October, a bomb exploded in a bus terminal in the southern Philippine city of Kidapawan, killing six people and injuring twenty-four. On the same day, the U.S. ambassador in Jakarta, Ralph Boyce, personally delivered to the Indonesian President a message of growing concern that Americans could become targets of terrorist actions in her country.

On 12 October, on the second anniversary of al-Qaeda's USS Cole bombing in Yemen, a huge car bomb killed more than 202 and injured 300 on the Indonesian resort island of Bali. Most are foreigners, mainly Australian tourists. It is preceded by a blast at the U.S. consulate in nearby Denpasar. The attack, known as the 2002 Bali bombings, was the most deadly attack executed by JI.

Bashir was arrested by the Indonesian police and was given a light sentence for treason.

=== 2003 ===
Jemaah Islamiyah is believed to have assisted local Moro Islamic Liberation Front members in carrying out the 2003 Davao City airport bombing and the 2003 Davao City ferry terminal bombing in the Philippines, which killed 39 people and injured nearly 200. A suspected MILF member later told authorities a senior JI leader named Zulkifli Abdhir had directed both attacks.

Hambali was arrested in Thailand on 11 August 2003, and is currently detained and awaiting trial by Military Commissions, in Guantanamo Bay, Cuba.

=== 2004 ===
A British-born Australian named Jack Roche confessed to being part of a JI plot to blow up the Israeli embassy in Canberra, Australia on 28 May 2004. He was sentenced to 9 years in prison on 31 May. The man admitted to meeting figures like Osama bin Laden in Afghanistan.

JI are widely suspected of being responsible for the bombing outside the Australian embassy in Jakarta on 9 September 2004, which killed 11 Indonesians and wounded over 100 more.

=== 2005 ===
JI are suspected of committing the 1 October 2005 Bali bombings.

On 9 November, a bomb-making expert in JI, Azahari Husin, was killed in a raid at Batu, East Java.

=== 2006 ===
On 5 August 2006, al-Qaeda's al-Zawahiri appeared on a recorded video announcing that JI and al-Qaeda had joined forces and that the two groups will form "one line, facing its enemies".

=== 2007 ===
On 13 June 2007, Abu Dujana, the head of JI's military operations, was captured by Indonesian police.

On 15 June, Indonesian police announced the capture of Zarkasih, who was leading Jemaah Islamiyah since the capture of Hambali. Zarkasih is believed to be the emir of JI.

=== 2008 ===
On 27 February 2008, the leader of JI in Singapore, Mas Selamat bin Kastari, escaped from the Whitley Road Detention Centre.

=== 2009 ===
On 1 April 2009, Mas Selamat bin Kastari was recaptured in a raid by Pasukan Gerakan Khas and Special Branch in Johor, Malaysia.

On 17 July, Jemaah Islamiyah was blamed for attacks on the JW Marriott and Ritz Carlton hotels in Jakarta.

On 17 September, Noordin Mohammad Top was killed in a raid by Indonesian police in Surakarta, Central Java. Noordin was a recruiter, bomb maker, and explosions expert for Jemaah Islamiyah. Although Noordin was connected to Jemaah Islamiyah, in 2006 Indonesian police reported that he and Azahari Husin had split from the organisation to form "an even more hardline group" which reportedly bore the name "Al-Qaeda Jihad Organisation for the Malay Archipelago". Until his death, Noordin was the most wanted Islamist militant in Indonesia.

=== 2010 ===
On 9 March 2010, Dulmatin was killed in a raid by the Densus 88 anti-terrorism squad in Pamulang, South Tangerang.

On 13 December, Indonesian police charged Abu Bakar Bashir, spiritual head of JI, with involvement in plans of terror and military training in Aceh province. His charge of inciting others to commit terrorism carried the death penalty.

=== 2012 ===
In January 2012, the Philippine military announced that it had killed two key leaders of Jemaah Islamiyah, a Malaysian called Zulkifli bin Hir (aka Marwan) and Mohammad Ali (aka Muawiyah). Senior intelligence sources later stated that Hir and Ali survived the air strike. Reports of Bin Hir's death were again retracted in 2014.

On 14 December, a Malaysian member of Jemaah Islamiyah, who was subsequently identified as Mohammad Noor Fikrie bin Abdul Kahar from Kedah, was shot dead by a S.W.A.T team sniper outside the Apo View Hotel in Poblacion District of Davao City, after he had threatened to detonate an I.E.D. made from a 60-millimeter mortar round when confronted by Philippine police.

=== 2014 ===
On 26 February 2014, Sheikh Kahar Mundos, a bomb maker, left a bomb in a motorcycle hidden at the city hall in Cagayan de Oro, Philippines.

On 27 June, Abdul Basit Usman, a bomb maker who was falsely reported as killed in a U.S. airstrike in Pakistan in 2010, was revealed to be alive and a potential terror threat.

On 16 September, Jemaah Islamiyah claimed responsibility for the bombing of the Rizal Monument in front of the city hall of General Santos, Philippines, killing one person and injuring seven.

=== 2015 ===
On 25 January 2015, JI member Zulkifli Abdhir was killed in the Philippines, an operation that also resulted in the death of 44 police officers.

=== 2019 ===
On 1 July 2019, Indonesian police arrested Para Wijayanto, who was said to have been the leader of Jemaah Islamiyah since 2007. On 2 July, Densus 88 counterterrorism unit of Indonesia traced palm oil plantations as a source of funding for the group, according to National Police spokesperson Brig. Gen. Dedi Prasetyo.

=== 2020 ===
On 23 November 2020, Indonesian police arrested Upik Lawanga, who was involved in the 2002 Bali bombings. His role involves constructing bombs to be used in several terror attacks.

On 10 December, Indonesian Police arrested Zulkarnaen, a high-ranking Jemaah Islamiyah official and leader. He is said to have been the mastermind of several terror attacks, including the 2002 Bali bombings, Christmas Eve 2000 Indonesia bombings, and 2003 Marriott Hotel bombing.

=== 2024 ===
On 17 May 2024, a Royal Malaysian Police station at Ulu Tiram, Johor was attacked by a man that was linked with Jemaah Islamiyah, killing two police officers and wounding one. The suspect was shot dead by another police officer during the attack. Police investigations revealed that the suspect, who has no criminal record, made preparations to confront the police – based on items found in his bag which he used as a shield. There were zinc sheets and paper inside. After the attack, the police launched a raid on the suspect's house and arrested his family members that were linked with the group, including his father.

== Dissolution ==
On 30 June 2024, key members of Jemaah Islamiyah dissolved the organization in a video declaration made at the National Counter Terrorism Agency in Bogor, near Jakarta. Abu Rusdan, a militant cleric and former JI leader arrested in Bekasi in September 2021, said that JI's senior council and the leaders of the group's affiliated Islamic boarding schools "have agreed to declare the dissolution of the JI and return to Indonesia's embrace". Para Wijayanto was also present at the declaration.

== See also ==
- 2003 Marriott Hotel bombing
- 2004 Jakarta embassy bombing
- 2005 Bali bombings
- 2005 Indonesian beheading of Christian girls
- Azahari Husin
- Islamist terrorism
- List of designated terrorist groups
- Zulkifli Abdhir
- Jamaah Ansharut Tauhid
- Jamaah Ansharut Daulah
