= 2020 in Indonesia =

- Centuries: 20th; 21st
- Decades: 2000s; 2010s; 2020s
- See also: History of Indonesia; Timeline of Indonesian history; List of years in Indonesia

2020 (MMXX) was a leap year starting on Wednesday of the Gregorian calendar, the 2020th year of the Common Era (CE) and Anno Domini (AD) designations, the 20th year of the 3rd millennium and the 21st century, and the 1st year of the 2020s decade.

In Indonesia, the year was marked by the COVID-19 pandemic, which started in March when two people from Jakarta tested positive to the disease. The government responded to the outbreak by enacting large-scale social restrictions (PSBB) throughout much of Indonesia, opting against imposing lockdowns because of economic reasons. The pandemic put the Indonesian economy into recession, the country's first in nearly two decades, with the rupiah free-falling. Multiple international events that were to have been hosted in Indonesia had to be cancelled because of the pandemic.

Students and workers protested in October against the government's controversial Omnibus Law, resulting in more than 5,000 arrests. Two ministers, Social Affairs Minister Juliari Batubara and Marine Affairs and Fisheries Minister Edhy Prabowo, were arrested in late 2020 for alleged corruption in separate cases.

== Incumbents ==
=== President and Vice President ===
President	Vice President
Joko Widodo	Ma'ruf Amin

=== Ministers and Coordinating Ministers ===
==== Coordinating Ministers ====
Photo	Position	Name
	Coordinating Minister of Political, Legal, and Security Affairs	Mahfud MD
	Coordinating Minister of Economic Affairs	Airlangga Hartarto
	Coordinating Minister of Maritime Affairs and Investment	Luhut Binsar Pandjaitan
	Coordinating Minister of Human Development and Culture	Muhadjir Effendy

==== Ministers ====
Photo	Position	Name
	Minister of State Secretariat	Pratikno
	Minister of Home Affairs	Tito Karnavian
	Minister of Foreign Affairs	Retno Marsudi
	Minister of Defence	Prabowo Subianto
	Minister of Law and Human Rights	Yasonna Laoly
	Minister of Finance	Sri Mulyani
	Minister of Energy and Mineral Resources	Arifin Tasrif
	Minister of Industry	Agus Gumiwang Kartasasmita
	Minister of Trade	Muhammad Lutfi
	Minister of Agriculture	Syahrul Yasin Limpo
	Minister of Environment and Forestry	Siti Nurbaya Bakar
	Minister of Transportation	Budi Karya Sumadi
	Minister of Marine Affairs and Fisheries	Sakti Wahyu Trenggono
	Minister of Manpower	Ida Fauziyah
	Minister of Public Works and Public Housing	Basuki Hadimuljono
	Minister of Health	Budi Gunadi Sadikin
	Minister of Education and Culture	Nadiem Makarim
	Minister of Agrarian Affairs and Spatial Planning	Sofyan Djalil
	Minister of Social Affairs	Tri Rismaharini
	Minister of Religious Affairs	Yaqut Cholil Qoumas
	Minister of Communication and Information Technology	Johnny G. Plate
	Minister of Research and Technology	Bambang Brodjonegoro
	Minister of Cooperatives and Small & Medium Enterprises	Teten Masduki
	Minister of Women's Empowerment and Child Protection	I Gusti Ayu Bintang Darmawati
	Minister of Administrative and Bureaucratic Reform	Tjahjo Kumolo
	Minister of Villages, Development of Disadvantaged Regions and Transmigration	Abdul Halim Iskandar
	Minister of National Development Planning	Suharso Monoarfa
	Minister of State-Owned Enterprises	Erick Thohir
	Minister of Tourism and Creative Economy	Sandiaga Uno
	Minister of Youth and Sports	Zainudin Amali

==== Former ministers (before cabinet reshuffle) ====
Photo	Position	Name
	Minister of Social Affairs	Juliari Batubara
	Minister of Tourism and Creative Economy	Wishnutama
	Minister of Religious Affairs	Fachrul Razi
	Minister of Health	Terawan Agus Putranto
	Minister of Trade	Agus Suparmanto
	Minister of Marine Affairs and Fisheries	Edhy Prabowo

== Events ==
=== January ===
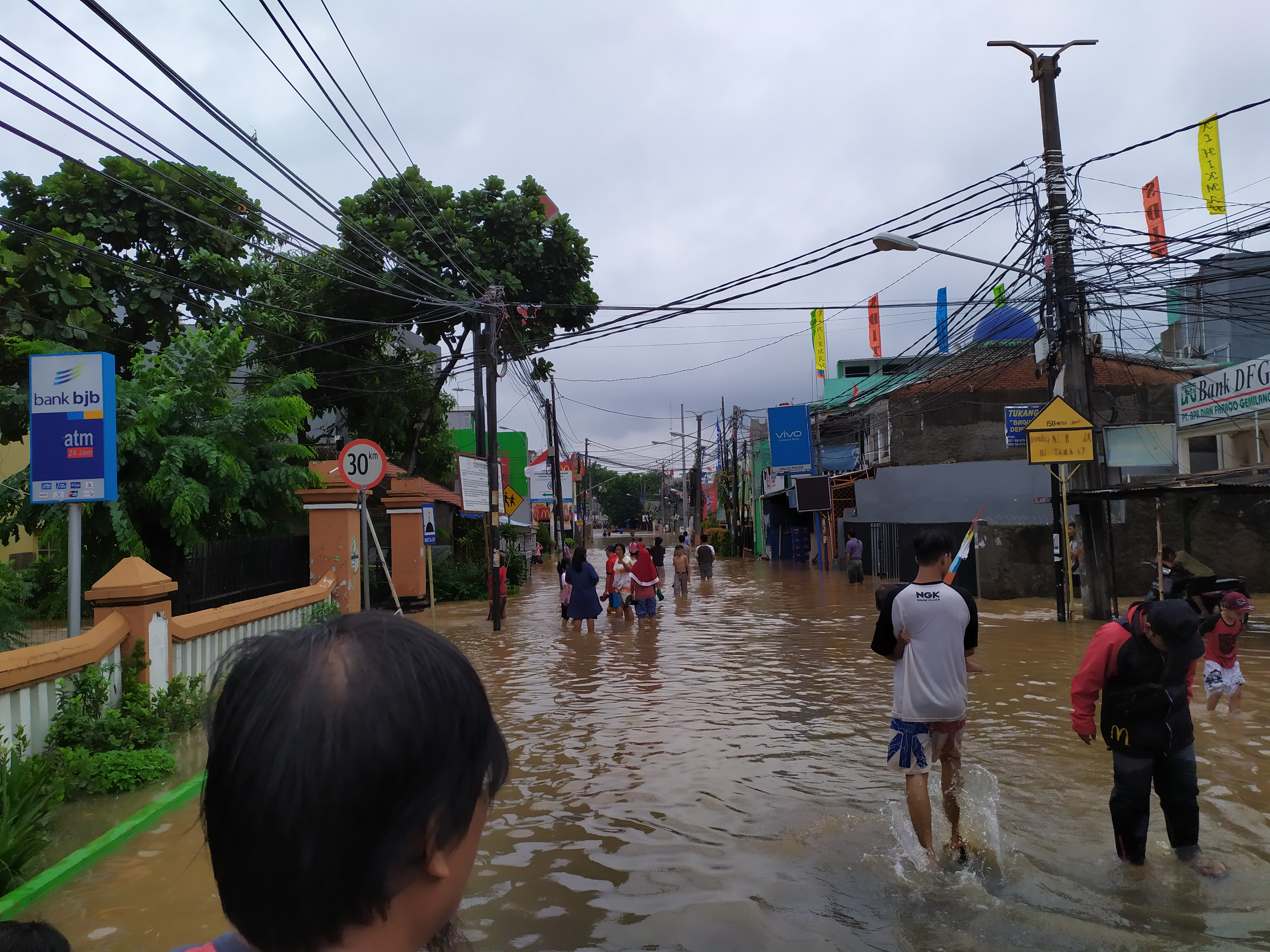
A massive flood struck the Indonesian capital Jakarta, which was described as one of the worst to have hit the capital since records began in Indonesia

- January 1 - At least 66 people were killed after a massive flood swept the Indonesian capital Jakarta. Dubbed as one of the worst floods in Jakarta history, the massive flood was caused by the highest recorded rainfall in 24 years since record began in Jakarta.
- January 6 - Indonesia announced that it was mobilizing fishermen and naval vessels to patrol the northern part of the Natuna Sea, following incursions by Chinese vessels.
- January 10 - The Indonesian Ministry of Forestry and Environment announced the termination of partnership with WWF due to alleged "untrue facts and data" claimed by the WWF.
- January 14 - Demonstrations took place in front of Jakarta City Hall. Opposition groups demanded the Governor of Jakarta Anies Baswedan to step down from his position due to the perceived mishandling of the emergency response in the 2020 Jakarta floods while supporters of Anies Baswedan also held two demonstrations to defend the incumbent.
- January 15 - Fictional kingdoms and mythical movements regarded by the government as deceitful acts towards Indonesians began to spring up across the country.
- January 17 - The leaders of the Indonesian micronation-cum-cult "Keraton Agung Sejagat" were arrested for public deception.
- January 28 - Leader of "Sunda Empire", Ki Ageng Rangga, was arrested in Bekasi for alleged disinformation and public deception. The organisation "Sunda Empire" was later disbanded by the government.
- January 29 - Outbreak of dengue fever led to the issuance of declaration of emergency by the government of Sikka Regency, East Nusa Tenggara
- January 30 - Henchman of the leader of a mythical movement called as "King of The King" was arrested for alleged public deception.
- January 31 - The Indonesian government expels American journalist Philip Myrer Jacobson of an environmental science news site Mongabay after spending ten days in jail for not having a journalist's visa. At least eight journalists have been deported since 2017.

=== February ===
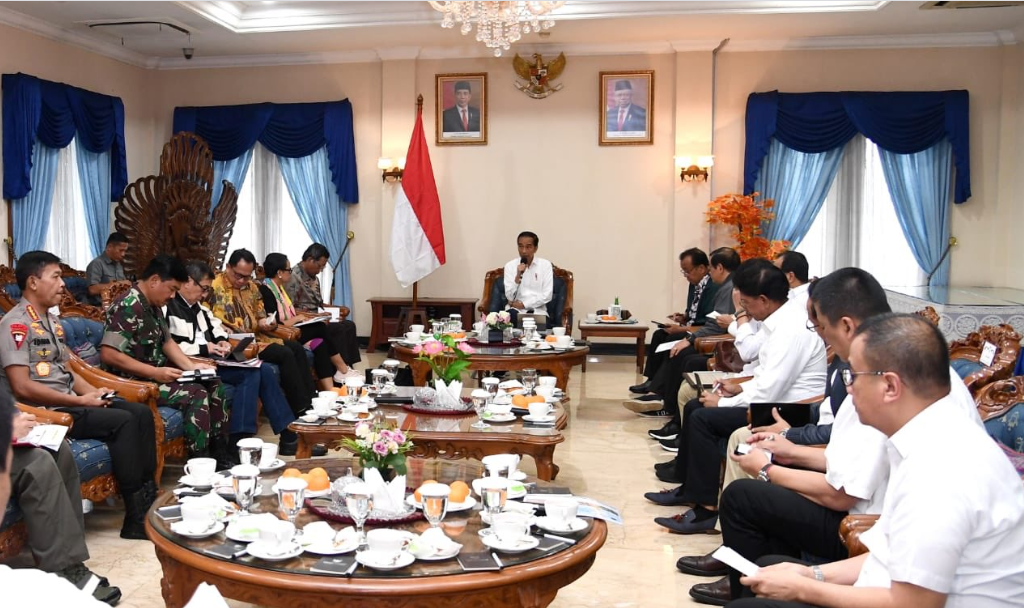
A high level meeting was held in Halim Perdanakusuma Airport, Jakarta to discuss on the evacuation of Indonesians from Wuhan

- February 1 - Anger and protests in Natuna as Indonesian government revealed plans to evacuate Indonesian citizens from Wuhan, the centre of the COVID-19 outbreak, to Raden Sadjad AFB in Natuna
- February 2
  - 238 Indonesians were successfully evacuated to Natuna from Wuhan. The Indonesian government had planned to evacuate Indonesians in Wuhan after a massive outbreak in China caused a global health emergency, infecting thousands and killing hundreds of people.
  - Indonesian government temporarily halts the issuance of its visa-free policy and visa on arrival for all tourists from China. All flights from and to mainland China are banned due to concern on the outbreak, effective by 5 February. Those who had been to mainland China for 14 days during the outbreak would not be allowed to enter or transit in Indonesia.
- February 5 - An Indonesian maid in Singapore becomes the first confirmed Indonesian to have contracted the COVID-19 disease.
- February 10 - The wreckage of an Indonesian Air Force military helicopter which had disappeared since June 2019 has been found on the mountainous region in Papua. All 12 passengers and crews were killed in the crash.
- February 11 - The Indonesian government refuses to repatriate 689 Indonesian citizens that had joined the Islamic State from Syria.
- February 12 - A riot erupted in Kabanjahe Detention Centre in Medan. Buildings were reportedly burned by inmates.
- February 15
  - A total of 238 Indonesians were allowed to go home after being quarantined by the Indonesian government in Natuna in response to the 2019-20 coronavirus pandemic in mainland China.
  - Residents evacuated after reports of radioactive leak at a residence housing employees of the Indonesian National Nuclear Energy Agency (BATAN) in South Tangerang
- February 16 - Indonesia won the 2020 Badminton Asia Team Championships in the Philippines.
- February 18 - Three Indonesian crew members of the Diamond Princess cruise ship were tested positive for coronavirus.
- February 21 - A total of 257 scout members consisting of grade 7 and grade 8 students were swept away during a river expedition in Sleman, Yogyakarta after a flash flood struck the area. At least 10 girl scouts were killed, with age ranging from 12 to 15 years old. A further 26 scout members were injured. Several people were charged for negligence.
- February 24 - The Indonesian Ministry of Health announced that a total of 9 Indonesian crew members of the Diamond Princess cruise ship have contracted the COVID-19 disease.
- February 25 - Hundreds evacuated after a second massive flood swept Jakarta in less than two months.
- February 26 - Indonesian government spent Rp 10.3 trillion rupiah (US$744 million) to influencers in hopes of attracting tourists who were scared off by the coronavirus pandemic.
- February 27
  - Talks are being held as Saudi Arabia temporarily bans the Islamic pilgrimage of Umrah amid efforts to contain the coronavirus pandemic, which has spread to dozens of countries around the world.
  - A total of 188 crew members of the World Dream cruise ship were evacuated by the government to KRI dr. Soeharso. They would undergo a 14-day quarantine at Sebaru Kecil Island, Thousands Islands for possible coronavirus infection.

=== March ===
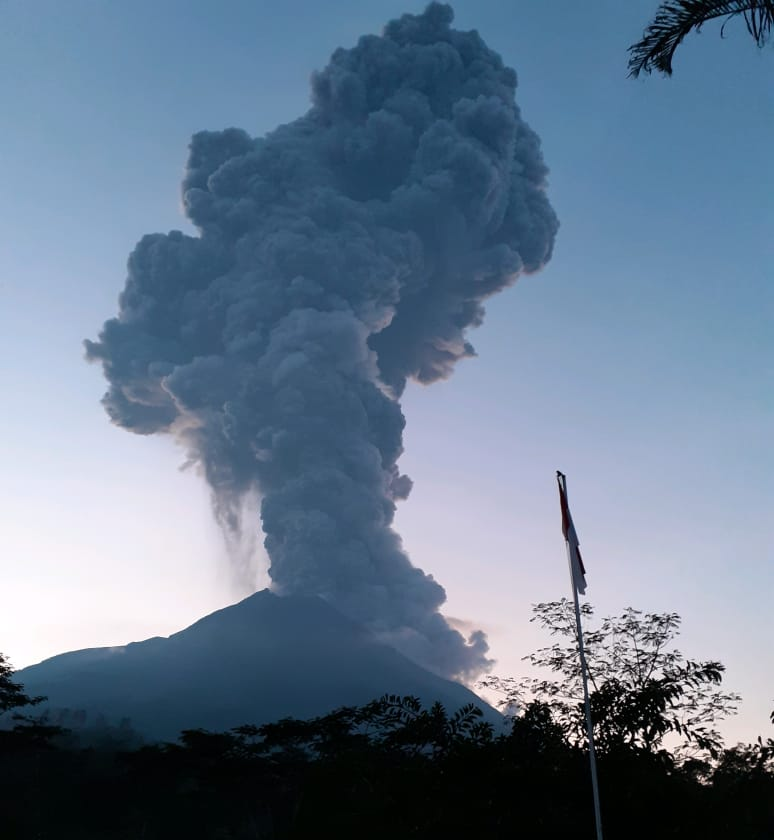
Eruption of Mount Merapi on 3 March 2020, seen from Babadan, Magelang, Central Java

- March 1
  - Due to the effect of the coronavirus on tourism, the Indonesian government announced that up to 50% flight discounts would be given to everyone, including foreign tourists, in hopes of attracting tourists to multiple destinations across Indonesia.
  - Indonesian president Joko Widodo reassured that the flight discounts would not spread the coronavirus throughout the country.
- March 2 - President Joko Widodo confirmed the first two cases of coronavirus in the country. According to the Minister of Health Terawan Agus Putranto, the patients contracted the virus from an infected Japanese person in Depok and later tested positive in Malaysia. Both were hospitalized in North Jakarta.
- March 3 - Mount Merapi erupted, sending ash as high as 6,000 meters to the sky and causing ashfall in Boyolali and neighboring regencies.
- March 4 - Government officials confirmed that another two people had been infected with the SARS-CoV-2 virus, raising the number of the infected to 4.
- March 5 - The Indonesian government decided to forbid the entry of tourists from Iran, Italy and South Korea, which at the time were the center of the coronavirus pandemic outside China.
- March 6 - The reigning Puteri Indonesia 2020 Queens are crowned; Raden Roro Ayu Maulida Putri of East Java crowned Puteri Indonesia 2020 (Miss Universe Indonesia), Putu Ayu Saraswati of Bali crowned Puteri Indonesia Lingkungan 2020 (Miss International Indonesia) and Jihane Almira Chedid of Central Java crowned Puteri Indonesia Pariwisata 2020 (Miss Supranational Indonesia), who was crowned on 6 March 2020 in Jakarta Convention Center.
- March 8 - A total of 6 people had been infected by the coronavirus.
- March 9
  - Number of people infected by the SARS-CoV-2 virus has jumped to 19.
  - At least 7 people were killed and another 20 were rescued after two boats carrying members of Presidential Security Force of Indonesia collided in Palangkaraya, Central Kalimantan. The collision caused the cancellation of King Willem-Alexander of the Netherlands and Queen Máxima of the Netherlands's visit to Central Kalimantan, who at the time were visiting Indonesia.
- March 10
  - An earthquake measuring 5.0 magnitude struck Sukabumi, West Java at a shallow depth of 10 km, causing damages to at least 200 homes. At least 3 people were injured and 300 people were evacuated due to the quake.
  - Government officials confirmed another 8 cases of the coronavirus, bringing the number of infections to 27.
- March 11
  - The Jakarta Formula E was postponed due to the coronavirus pandemic.
  - A British national who had been tested positive for coronavirus has died in Bali, making it the first coronavirus-linked fatality in the country. Another 7 cases of the virus were also confirmed by officials, raising the total number of people infected with the virus to 34.
  - Indonesian Minister of Manpower Ida Fauziah ordered companies in Indonesia to provide face masks and hand sanitizers to prevent the spread of the coronavirus
- March 13
  - Cases of COVID-19 in the nation jumps to 69
  - A total of 1,216 people has been infected with dengue fever in Sikka, East Nusa Tenggara
  - First death of an Indonesian citizen caused by the coronavirus was confirmed by officials. A man in his 50s has died at a hospital in Solo, Central Java.
- March 14
  - The number of people who were infected by the SARS-CoV-2 virus has jumped to 96
  - Minister of Transportation Budi Karya Sumadi has tested positive for COVID-19, making him the first high ranking government official to be infected by the virus.
  - The city of Solo declared an emergency over the coronavirus pandemic
  - In response to the ongoing coronavirus pandemic, some provinces chose to close schools until indefinite time. Lectures and classes were cancelled and some gatherings were banned
  - National disaster declaration as fears of rapidly spreading coronavirus cases grow.
- March 15 - The number of COVID-19 cases rises to 117.
- March 16
  - Indonesia confirmed 17 new cases of infection, in total of 134 cases. 14 of new cases in Jakarta, 1 new case in Central Java, 1 new case in Banten, and 1 new case in West Java.
  - Indonesia announced that it will start to quarantine non symptomatic COVID-19 patients on their own home.
- March 17 - The Indonesian Government announced another 38 new cases of COVID-19, bringing the total number to 172.
- March 18
  - Coronavirus cases rises to 227.
  - West Kalimantan declares an emergency due to the ongoing COVID-19 outbreak
- March 19
  - The government announced 81 new cases of COVID-19, bringing the total number of confirmed cases to 308 in the country. It also announced that rapid testing tools for the virus would be ordered from China.
  - Regent of Gowa announced that Ijtima Dunia, a Tabligh Akbar with participants from all over the world, had been cancelled due to concerns that the event might accelerate the rate of coronavirus infections in the province.
- March 20
  - Total number of infections rises to 369.
  - Emergency declaration in Jakarta and East Java as numbers of coronavirus infections kept rising
  - President Joko Widodo announced that the government had ordered 5,000 Avigan (Favipiravir) and 5 million chloroquine, which were going to be tested to patients who had contracted the coronavirus. He also announced that, starting today on 20 March, mass rapid testings would be conducted on areas with high number of infections.
- March 21
  - Number of infections rises to 450.
  - Minister of Defence Prabowo Subianto ordered the Indonesian Armed Forces to pick up approximately 9 tonnes of medical equipment in Shanghai, China.
  - Rising number of coronavirus cases prompted the government to turn Kemayoran's athletes village as a makeshift hospital.
- March 22
  - Number of infections rises to 514.
  - Governor of West Java Ridwan Kamil announced that mass rapid testing for the virus would be held on 25 March.
- March 23

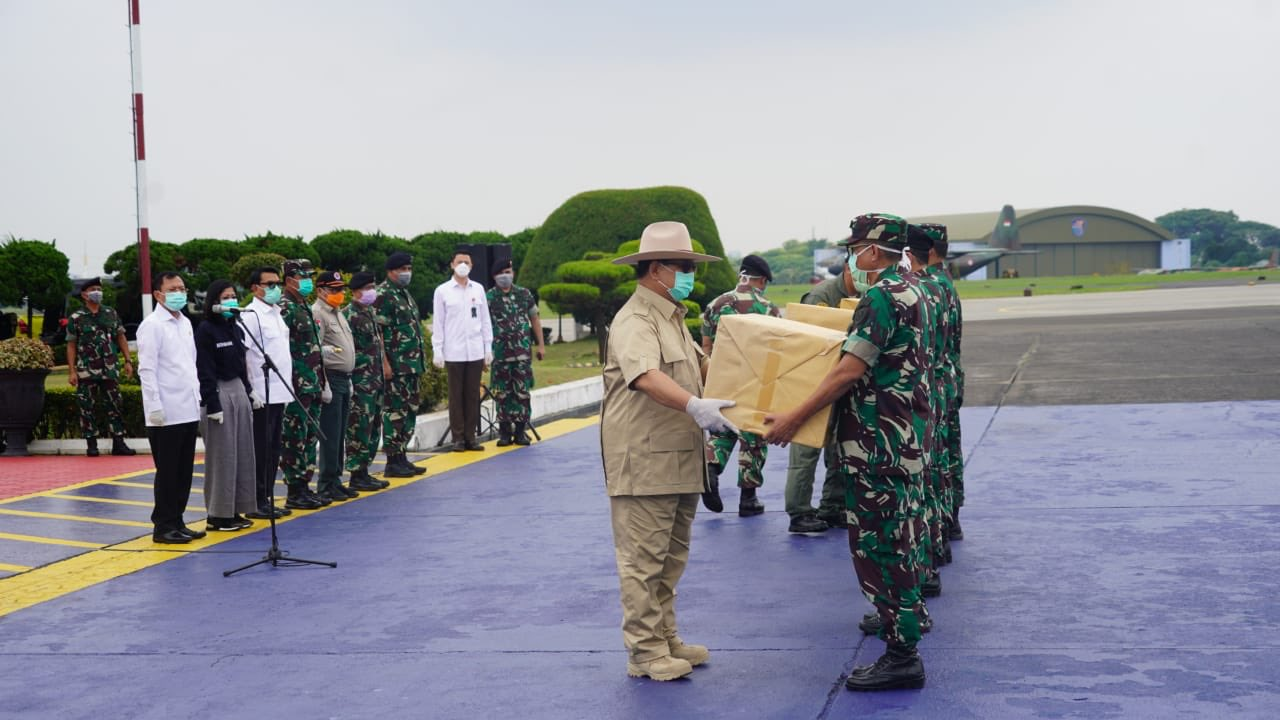
Medical supplies were picked up from China in response to the coronavirus outbreak in Indonesia

  - Number of coronavirus cases rises to 579.
  - President Joko Widodo opened the first makeshift hospital in Kemayoran, Jakarta in response to the ongoing coronavirus pandemic.
- March 24
  - A total of 107 new cases of coronavirus infections were confirmed by the government.
  - The 2020 National Examination has been cancelled due to the outbreak.
  - The government announced that it has distributed a total of 125,000 rapid testing kits to all 34 provinces in Indonesia.
  - Papua announced that all means of transport from and in to the province would be shut down amid the coronavirus pandemic, effective by 26 March.
- March 25
  - Numbers of people tested positive with coronavirus has risen to 790.
  - The Indonesian Ministry of Transportation discouraged Indonesians to participate in this year's Eid-al Fitr's annual tradition of Mudik.
- March 26
  - Coronavirus cases rises to 893 with an increase of 20 deaths, the largest rise since the start of the outbreak in the country.
  - Mayor of Tegal announced a lockdown on the entire city, starting on 30 March. All means of transport from and in to the city would not be allowed by authorities.
  - Fears of thousands of undetected coronavirus infections as Indonesia ranks low in terms of testing for coronavirus detection.
- March 27
  - Number of coronavirus infections tops 1,000 mark.
  - Mount Merapi erupted for the second time in less than a month, sending ash as high as 5,000 meters to the sky. Ashfall was reported in Magelang, Central Java. It later erupted again in less than 12 hours with an ash column of 1,000 meters.
- March 28
  - A total of 109 new cases of coronavirus were confirmed by the government, bringing the number of accumulative cases to 1,155. Total number of deaths has reached 100.
  - At least 150 members of a mosque congregation in Kebon Jeruk, Jakarta were quarantined at the mosque after 3 members had tested positive for the coronavirus.
- March 29 - Confirmed coronavirus cases rises to 1,285.
- March 30
  - Coronavirus cases rises to 1,414
  - Indonesian government announced that coronavirus task force have been set up in all Indonesia's 34 provinces.
- March 31
  - During an address to the nation, Indonesian president Joko Widodo announced the implementation of "large-scale social restrictions" (PSBB), which would restrict the mobility of people during the outbreak, adding that electrical fees for 24 million people in Indonesia would be compensated by the government for three months. The government had considered regional quarantine, but later refused and opted for the PSBB.
  - Health emergency has been declared by the government in response to the growing number of coronavirus cases.

=== April ===
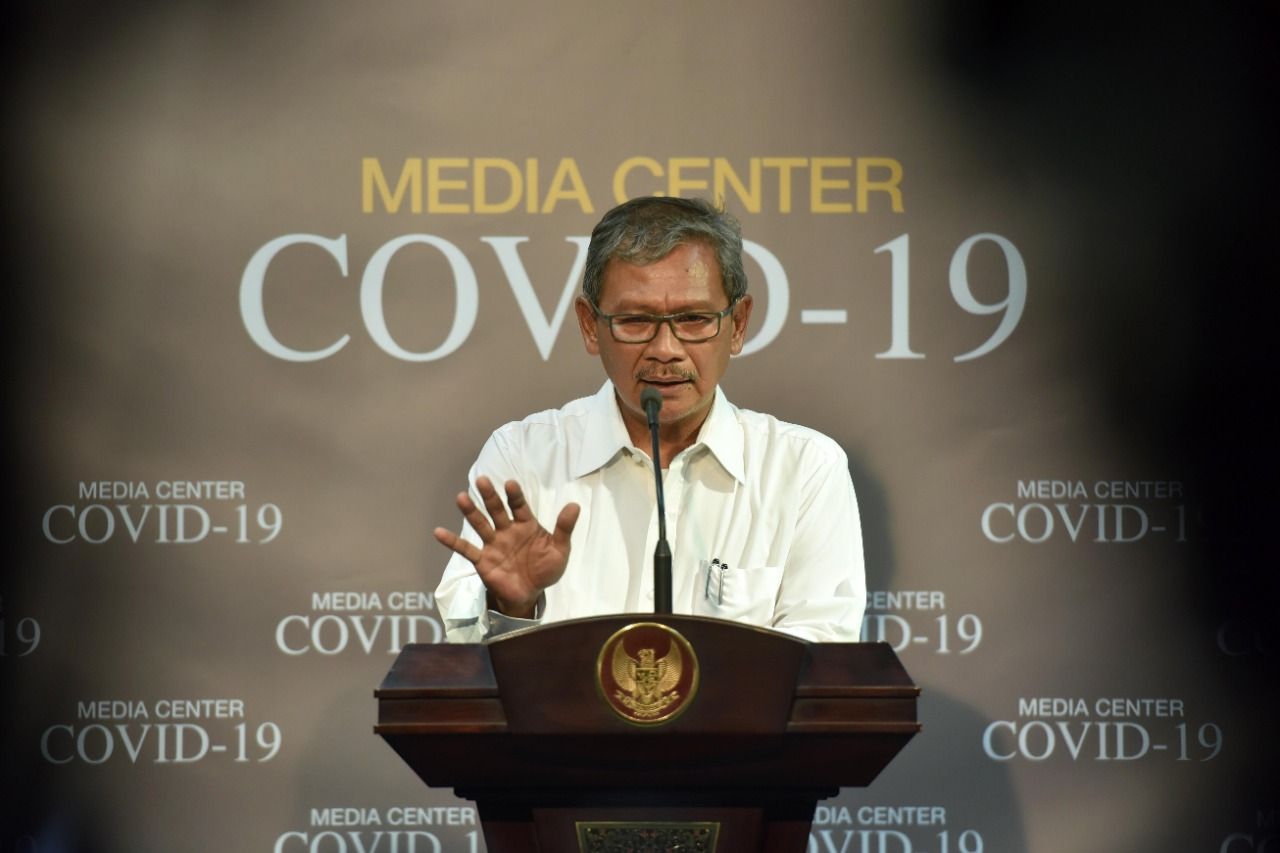
Government spokesman on the development of COVID-19 pandemic in Indonesia, Achmad Yurianto, delivers the daily progress of the outbreak

- April 1
  - Indonesia's case fatality rate remains as one of the highest in the world, as number of deaths rises to 157. Cases of COVID-19 rises to 1,677.
  - Reports emerged that multiple villagers in Indonesia had refused the burial of coronavirus victims in their villages. Ambulances were reportedly pelted with stones and shouted at.
  - Concerns as cases of discrimination towards medical workers, coronavirus patients and suspected coronavirus patients were reported across the nation.
- April 2
  - Indonesian government announced that at least 30,000 prisoners would be released due to fear of mass outbreak in overcrowded prisons.
  - Outrage as Indonesian Minister for Security and Human Rights, Yasonna Laoly, suggested to release prisoners who had been convicted for corruption. The government later clarified that those who were convicted for corruptions, illegal logging, terrorism, drug crimes, gross human rights crimes or transnational organized crimes would not be released from prison.
  - Regent of North Morowali Aptripel Tumimomor has died while being under observation for the coronavirus. He later tested positive for the virus.
  - Mount Merapi erupted with an observed ash column of 3,000 meters. Ashfall was reported in Sleman Regency.
- April 3
  - Coronavirus cases in Indonesia rises to 1,986
  - Government spokesman announced that tuberculosis diagnostic machines would be converted to COVID-19 detection kit.
  - More than 300,000 PPEs had been distributed throughout Indonesia's 34 provinces.
- April 4 - Coronavirus cases passes 2,000 mark.
- April 5
  - Cases of coronavirus infections rises to 2,273.
  - Due to the growing number of infections, the Indonesian Government ordered every citizens in Indonesia to wear a mask when in public.
- April 6
  - Death toll from the coronavirus outbreak in Indonesia tops 200, the highest deaths in Southeast Asia to date
  - The makeshift hospital in Galang Island, Batam, is officially opened. The hospital will be used to treat coronavirus patients in the country.
  - Government of Jakarta announced that those who didn't use mask in public would not be allowed to board any public transportation.
- April 7
  - Government announced 248 new coronavirus cases, the highest rise to date.
  - Ministry of Health granted Jakarta's decision to impose large-scale social restrictions, starting April 10, becoming the first province to implement the program.
- April 8
  - Number of coronavirus infections rises to 2,956 and the death toll rises to 240. 220 people had recovered from the disease.
  - Officials announced that the government would buy 20 diagnostic machines from Swiss company giant Roche. Each would hold a capacity for 10,000 samples per day and would be distributed to 12 provinces across Indonesia.
- April 9
  - Number of coronavirus cases tops 3,000
  - Gorontalo confirms its first case, becoming the last province in Indonesia to do so. The coronavirus was confirmed to have spread to all Indonesia's 34 provinces.
  - Ministry of Education announced that the government would provide televised study sessions for all students ranging from kindergarten to high school students on the Indonesian national television channel TVRI.
- April 10
  - Residents of Depok and Jakarta were stunned by a loud explosive sound during the early hours of April 10. Locals speculated that the eruption of Mount Anak Krakatoa in Sunda Strait might have been the cause, but it was later clarified by Volcanological Survey of Indonesia that the loud boom was caused by thunders in Mount Salak.
  - Mount Merapi erupted for the second time in more than a week, with an observed ash column of 3,000 meters.
  - Mount Anak Krakatoa erupted twice, sending ash as high as 200–500 meters.
- April 11
  - Ministry of Health approved the implementation of Large-scale mobility restriction (PSBB) in Bogor, Depok, and Bekasi.
  - Indonesian government launched the Indonesian pre-employment card to support those who suffered economic difficulty due to the outbreak of coronavirus.
- April 12
  - Largest increase of coronavirus cases as government confirmed 399 new cases. Number of coronavirus infections passes 4,000
  - Clash between the Indonesian National Armed Forces and Indonesian National Police in Papua killed at least 3 people.
- April 13
  - At least 26 crew members of MV Lambelu were tested positive for the coronavirus
  - Health ministry denied the request for PSBB from three provinces as the condition of the provinces "didn't meet the criteria" for implementation.
- April 14
  - Government announced that around 139,000 people are currently being monitored and more than 11,000 are being supervised for COVID-19. This marks the first time that the government announce the number of people under monitoring and under supervision for the virus.
  - At least 14 crew members of MV Kelud were tested positive for the coronavirus.
- April 15
  - Coronavirus cases pass 5,000 mark
  - Government accepts Riau's request to implement PSBB in the province
- April 16
  - Government confirmed 102 recoveries and 27 new deaths from the coronavirus, totalling 548 recoveries and 496 deaths. This marks the first time that the number of recovered patients is higher than the number of deaths since the pandemic began in Indonesia. Case Fatality Rate (CFR) remains high.
  - At least 46 medical workers were infected with the coronavirus at a hospital in Semarang, Central Java.
- April 17
  - Government confirmed 407 new coronavirus cases, making it the largest daily increase since the start of the pandemic in the nation.
  - With 5,923 confirmed coronavirus cases, Indonesia becomes the country with the highest confirmed coronavirus cases in Southeast Asia, overtaking the Philippines. It remains as the country with the highest death toll of the COVID-19 pandemic in Asia outside of China.
  - Authorities announced a total of 66 new coronavirus cases on MV Lambelu, bringing the total number of infected on the ship to 92.
- April 18
  - Confirmed coronavirus cases has reached 6,000, with more than 500 deaths. Government spokesman announced that Rp400 trillion had been allocated for the response against the coronavirus outbreak.
  - Ministry of Communication announced that at least 89 people had been apprehended for disinformation. It also confirmed that at least 554 coronavirus-linked hoaxes had been detected by cyber police.
- April 21
  - Confirmed coronavirus cases pass 7,000 mark
  - President Joko Widodo announced a ban on mudik, the largest annual human migration in the country, effective by 24 April, aiming to decrease the number of infections of COVID-19.
  - Pre-employment card scandal causes the resignation of one of Joko Widodo's "millennial" advisors Belva Devara.
- April 22 - Prominent Indonesian activist Ravio Patra was arrested for "calls for anarchy". News of the arrest went viral and was quickly followed by protests from the public, who demanded the police to release Ravio. There were allegations that the arrest had been set up by authorities due to Ravio being critical to the government's policies.
- April 24
  - After days of protests, activist Ravio Patra was released by the Indonesian National Police.
  - Commercial flights are officially banned from flying over Indonesian airspace by the government in hopes of curbing the spread of COVID-19.
  - Andi Taufan, another "millennial" advisor to the government, has decided to step down due to a controversy.
- April 25 - Coronavirus cases pass 8,000 mark while the total number of recovered patients has reached 1,000.
- April 27 - Coronavirus cases pass 9,000 mark.
- April 28 - A review of data from numerous health institutions across Indonesia's 34 provinces made by Reuters revealed that at least 2,200 people had died with coronavirus-like symptoms, prompting fears of undocumented COVID-19 deaths and further undetected cases across Indonesia.
- April 30 - Coronavirus cases pass 10,000 mark

=== May ===
- May 3
  - Number of coronavirus infections rises to more than 11,000.
  - Reports of leak of 91 million users accounts of Tokopedia, one of the largest online shopping application in Indonesia, due to suspected hacking.
- May 5 - Government spokesman Achmad Yurianto confirmed 484 new cases of coronavirus infections, making it the largest daily rise since the pandemic began. Number of infections passes 12,000 mark.
- May 6
  - Outrage after a video revealed an alleged exploitation of more than a dozen Indonesian crews aboard a Chinese vessel. South Korean authorities reportedly had seized the vessel in South Korean waters. Later investigation revealed that at least 3 Indonesians had died.
  - In response to the alleged discrimination and exploitation made by the Chinese crews, the Indonesian government called the Chinese ambassador for clarification.
  - Bootleg liquor kills at least 9 people in Blitar, East Java.
- May 7
  - President Joko Widodo warned of a possible food crisis due to the ongoing pandemic. Similar warning had been issued earlier by the FAO.
  - Indonesian government decided to resume operation of every mode of transportation in Indonesia, citing "national economy" as the main reason.
- May 8 - Indonesian YouTuber Ferdian Paleka was arrested after his controversial prank on multiple waria in Bandung went viral on social media, prompting condemnation from the general public.
- May 13
  - Raise on BPJS Kesehatan premiums causes discontent among the general public.
  - More than 15,000 people have been confirmed positive for COVID-19 in Indonesia.
  - Due to the rising number of COVID-19 infections in Indonesia, the Indonesian Ulema Council (MUI) published a fatwa on Eid prayers, which includes procedures on how to perform Eid prayers at home.
- May 14 - Indonesian government allowed people under 45 years old to go to work after reported uptick in layoffs.

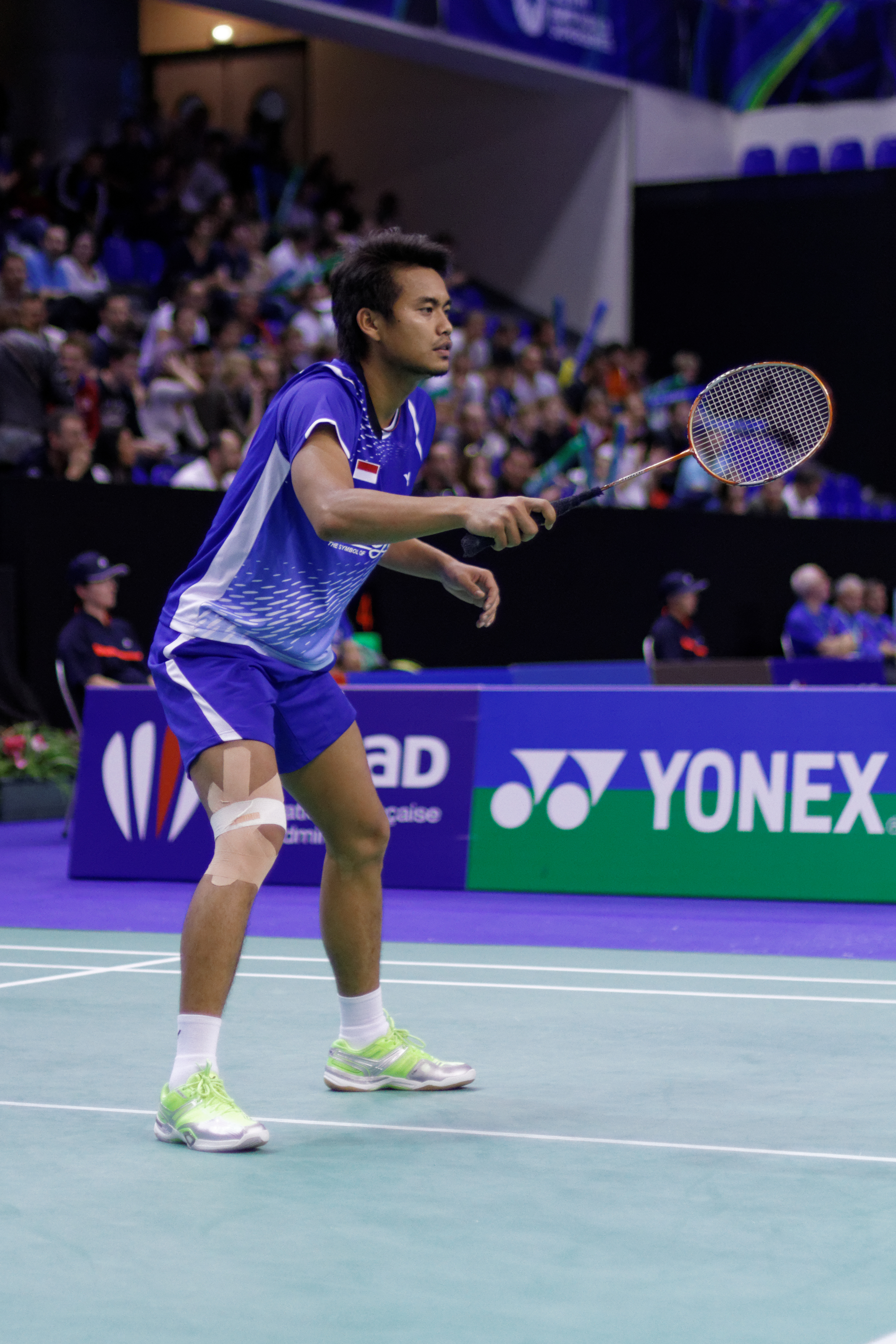
Indonesian badminton athlete Tontowi Ahmad

- May 18 - Indonesian athlete Tontowi Ahmad announced his retirement from badminton.
- May 20 - More than 230 houses were damaged or destroyed after a tornado struck a village in Tulang Bawang Regency, Lampung. At least 2 people were killed.
- May 21 - Highest daily increase in COVID-19 cases after government announces 973 new cases. More than 20,000 people have been infected by the coronavirus.
- May 24 - At least 109 medical workers were dismissed for striking over lack of PPEs and welfare in Ogan Komering Ilir Regency, South Sumatra.
- May 28–29 - Calls for investigation after participants of a discussion forum in Gadjah Mada University were terrorized by unknown people.
- May 29
  - Government "New Normal" concept, which would allow people to visit public spaces, re-opening schools, re-opening of stores, places of worship and re-opening of tourist destinations across Indonesia, was heavily criticized by members of the Indonesian House of Representatives, public, multiple organisations and notable public figures across Indonesia.
  - Coronavirus cases pass 25,000 mark.

=== June ===
- June 2 - The Ministry for Religious Affairs announced the cancellation of the 2020 Hajj pilgrimage due to COVID-19.
- June 4
  - At least 17 buildings were damaged after a magnitude 4.8 earthquake struck the island of Sabang, Aceh.
  - A magnitude 6.8 earthquake on the Richter scale struck the Morotai Regency, North Maluku, at a depth of 111 km with a Mercalli intensity of IV. More than 300 houses were damaged or destroyed.
- June 6 - At least 4 people were killed and 5 others were severely injured after an Indonesian Army Mil Mi-17 helicopter crashed in Kendal, Central Java.
- June 10 - A total of 1,241 new cases of COVID-19 were recorded, the highest daily increase in a single day since the pandemic began in Indonesia.
- June 11 - Prosecutors charged two police officers who perpetrated the acid attack on member of Corruption Eradication Commission (KPK) Novel Baswedan for 1-year prison sentence. The perceived light sentence caused outrage among Indonesian activists and the general public.
- June 15 - An Indonesian Air Force Hawk 200 crashed onto a residential area in Kampar Regency, Riau. The pilot of the aircraft suffered minor injury. No one on the ground were killed or injured in the crash.
- June 17 - With a total of 41,431 cases of COVID-19, Indonesia surpasses Singapore as the nation with the highest number of cases in Southeast Asia.
- June 18 - A total of 1,331 new cases of COVID-19 were confirmed by the government, the highest daily increase since the pandemic began.
- June 21 - Mount Merapi erupted twice, sending an ash column as high as 6,000 m to the sky. Ashfall was reported in Magelang, Central Java. Flights, however, were not disrupted due to the incident.
- June 25
  - Confirmed COVID-19 cases in Indonesia pass 50,000 mark
  - Members of the Islamic Defenders Front (FPI) and PA 212 held a rally in front of the Indonesian House of Representatives condemning the controversial Pancasila Ideology Guidelines (HIP) bill.
- June 26 - Supporters of the Indonesian Democratic Party of Struggle held a long march in Bekasi in response to the burning of the party's flag during the June 25th protest on the controversial HIP bill.
- June 28 - More than 1,000 cases of recoveries were recorded for the first time since the pandemic began in Indonesia.

=== July ===
- July 1
  - World Bank classifies Indonesia as an Upper Middle Income Country as Indonesia's GNI (per capita) has increased from US$3,840 in 2018 to US$4,050 in 2019.
  - Government of Jakarta bans single-use plastics.
- July 2 - A total of 1,624 new cases of COVID-19 were recorded, the highest daily increase in a single day.
- July 3
  - Growing criticisms after the Indonesian Ministry of Agriculture announced that an "antivirus necklace" made from eucalyptus would be mass-produced and distributed throughout the country by the next two months.
  - Members from the Indonesian House of Representatives and officials from Indonesian Institute of Sciences (LIPI) questioned the govt on the data of the antiviral medication.
- July 4 - Dozens of protesters demonstrated in front of Istana Merdeka due to the perceived govt's failure on the handling of the school enrollment process (PPDB).
- July 6 - At least 19 people were rescued, 3 were killed and 7 others were missing after MV Lampara sank off the coast of Kupang, East Nusa Tenggara.
- July 7 - UNESCO officially established Lake Toba as one of UNESCO's Global Geoparks.
- July 9 - An outbreak of COVID-19 cases was reported at an Indonesian Army's Officer Candidate School in Bandung with a total of 1,262 cases of COVID-19 were reported at the school.
- July 10 - Yodhi Prabowo, an editor for Indonesian television station Metro TV, was found dead with stab wounds. His body was found lying next to a motorway in South Jakarta.
- July 12 - More than 75,000 cases of COVID-19 were reported in Indonesia.

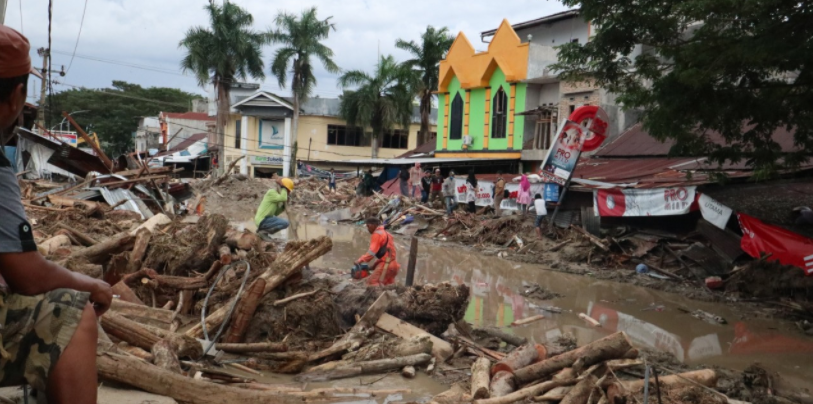
Aftermath of the massive flash flood that struck Luwu Regency, South Sulawesi

- July 13 - At least 16 people were killed and dozens more were missing after a massive flash flood struck six different districts throughout North Luwu Regency in South Sulawesi. More than 4,900 families were affected and more than 600 were displaced due to the disaster.
- July 16 - Hundreds of people gathered in front of the House of Representatives and Istana Bogor to protest over the controversial Pancasila Ideology Guideline (HIP) bill.
- July 17 - Massive flood struck 78 villages and 9 districts in Wajo Regency, South Sulawesi.
- July 18 - Total of COVID-19 cases in Indonesia tops China, becomes one of the ten hardest-hit countries in Asia.
- July 19 - Death toll reached 36 as rescuers recovered more bodies after a flash flood struck North Luwu, South Sulawesi. More than a dozen people were listed as missing.
- July 20
  - The Indonesian government disbanded the COVID-19 Task Force, forming the National Economy Recovery Task Force and effectively ended the press conference for the daily increase of COVID-19 cases in Indonesia.
  - As much as 2,400 COVID-19 vaccines have arrived in Indonesia from China. The vaccines will be distributed throughout the nation for its phase III clinical trial in August.
- July 22 - Government recorded 139 new deaths from COVID-19, the highest number of deaths since the start of the outbreak in Indonesia.
- July 23 - Bank Indonesia projects that Indonesia will enter an economic recession on the third quarter of 2020.
- July 25 - Indonesian police announced that the death of Metro TV editor Yodhi Prabowo was caused by self-inflicted wound.
- July 27 - Total number of COVID-19 cases in Indonesia passes 100,000 mark.
- July 29 - A Twitter thread concerning a "sexual mummification" fetish case went viral, prompting calls for investigation.
- July 30 - Graft fugitive Djoko Tjandra was arrested by the Indonesian National Police in Malaysia.

=== August ===
- August 1 - Airlangga University of Surabaya officially opened an investigation into allegations of "sexual mummification" fetish.
- August 4
  - Indonesian musician Anji and Hadi Pranoto were summoned by police due to suspected public misinformation.
  - Indonesian Medical Association (Ikatan Dokter Indonesia) reported Indonesian drummer Jerinx to the police due to alleged defamation.
- August 5 - The economy of Indonesia shrinks for the first time in 20 years.
- August 8
  - Ministry of Education and Culture allowed schools in the yellow zone of COVID-19 transmission to re-open.
  - Mt. Sinabung erupted twice in North Sumatra.
- August 10 - Mt. Sinabung erupted twice on a single day, spewing ash as high as 5,000 m. Ashes from the eruptions are predicted to fall to the north, reaching as far as Malaysia and may cause flight disruptions.
- August 11 - The phase three clinical trial of Sinovac COVID-19 vaccine has officially started in Indonesia.
- August 12 - Indonesian drummer Jerinx was named by the police as suspect in the defamation case of IDI.
- August 17 - To commemorate the 75th anniversary of Indonesian independence, Bank Indonesia issued the Rp75,000 banknote.
- August 18 - In response to the growing discontent towards the House of Representatives and the government, prominent political figures formed a "Save Indonesia Coalition" (KAMI). The formation of the coalition was viewed as a warning to the government by political experts.
- August 19 - A doublet earthquake struck off the coast of Bengkulu with a magnitude 6.6 and 6.7 with a depth of 24 km and 86 km, respectively. No injuries were reported but several structures were damaged.
- August 20 - After two decades of development stagnation, the N250 prototype aircraft (named as Gatotkaca) was set to be displayed at Yogyakarta's Dirgantara Mandala Museum.

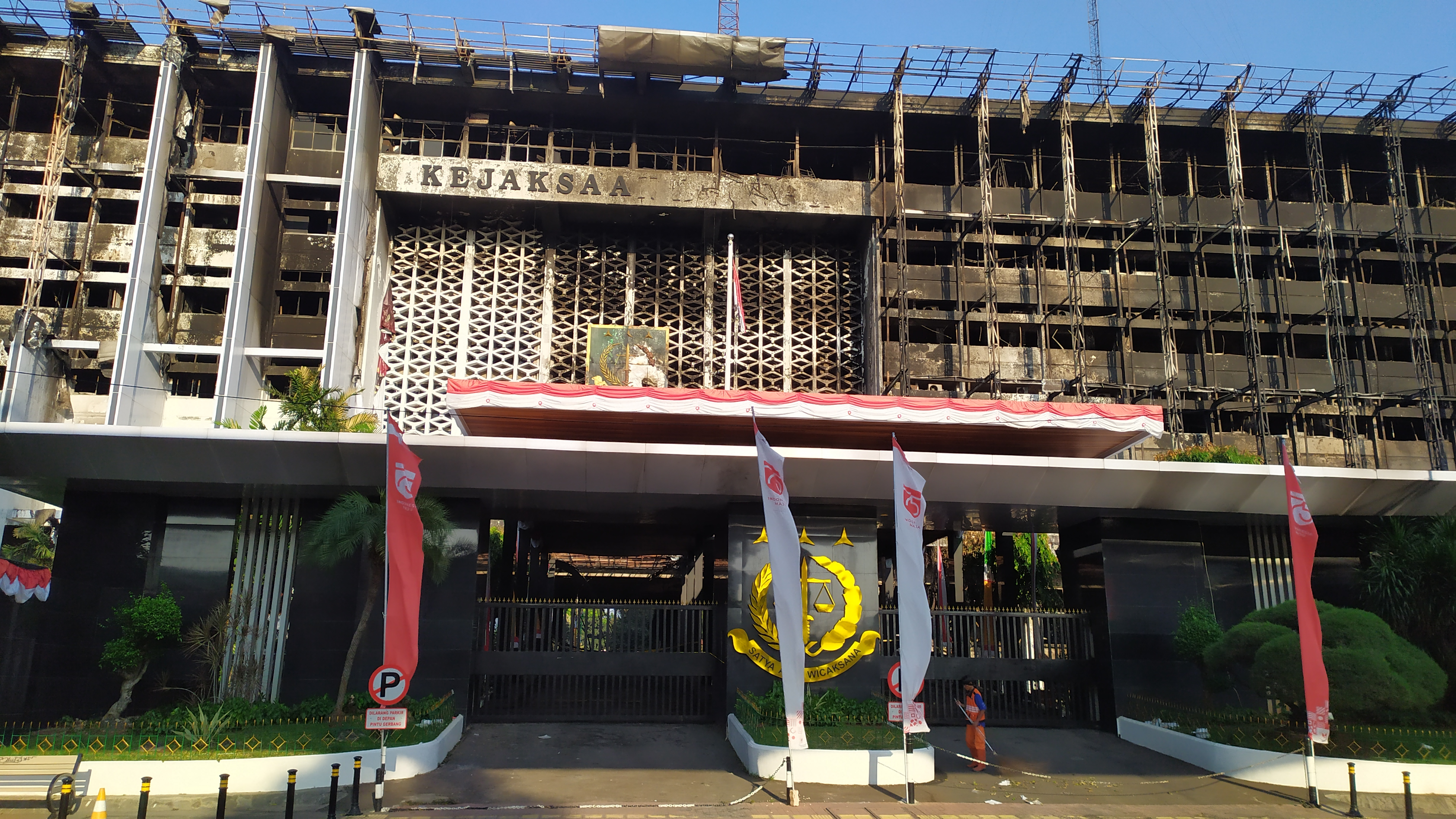
Aftermath of the massive fire that destroyed the General Attorney of Indonesia

- August 22 - A massive fire tore through the Attorney General's Office in Jakarta.
- August 27 - Privately owned Indonesian television station RCTI and iNews faced backlash after filing a petition to "establish a level-playing-field" by calling a review on the legality of over-the-top (OTT) digital content and service providers.
- August 28 - At least 100 unidentified perpetrators attacked Ciracas Police Station in East Jakarta. The building was set alight and at least 2 members of the police were injured in the attack.
- August 29 - A gay sex party was raided by the police in Kuningan, South Jakarta. At least 56 people were arrested.
- August 31 - National Commission for Child Protection (KPAI) was under fire for possibility of criminalizing the use of the word "Anjay".

=== September ===
- September 8
  - Total number of COVID-19 cases in Indonesia passes 200,000 mark.
  - The U.S. Centers for Disease Control and Prevention (CDC) issued a level three alert for U.S. citizens who were planning to travel to Indonesia.
  - The Indonesian National Development Planning Agency announced that the Indonesian capital relocation program will be halted due to the ongoing COVID-19 pandemic.
- September 9
  - A magnitude 5.7 earthquake struck Melonguane, Talaud Islands Regency in North Sulawesi at a depth of 74 km. At least 31 structures across three districts were damaged and 2 people were injured.
  - Indonesian official announced that a volunteer for a COVID-19 vaccine program has tested positive for the virus.
- September 10
  - Indonesian National Armed Forces to dismiss 56 personnel after alleged involvement in the attack on Ciracas Police Station.
  - Jump in COVID-19 cases caused the reinstatement of PSBB in Jakarta. Economic experts predicted that Indonesia would enter a recession due to the move.
- September 13 - Prominent religious figure Syeikh Ali Jaber was stabbed during a graduation of hafiz in Lampung.
- September 15 - Pertamina General Commissioner Basuki Tjahaja Purnama revealed massive management issues in Pertamina.
- September 21 - Amidst calls for postponement of the 2020 local elections due to the ongoing pandemic, President Joko Widodo reiterated that the election will be continued.
- September 25 - ITB's Global Geophysics Research Group released a tsunami hazard map for the island of Java. The report revealed that a megathrust earthquake with a potential magnitude of 9.1 MW followed by a tsunami as high as 20 meters could hit the southern coast of Java in the future.

=== October ===
- October 4 - COVID-19 cases in Indonesia pass another grim milestone with 300,000 confirmed cases. Indonesia remains as the country with the highest COVID-19 death toll in Southeast Asia.
- October 5
  - The Omnibus Law on Job Creation was passed by the Indonesian House of Representatives. Critics say the controversial bill may restrict some Indonesian laborers' rights, including maternity leave, minimum wage, compensation and other workers' rights.
  - As Indonesian jobs creation bill drew fierce criticisms from the public, global investors warned on a possible effect of the bill on environment.
  - Trade unions announced plans for strike due to the passing of the bill.

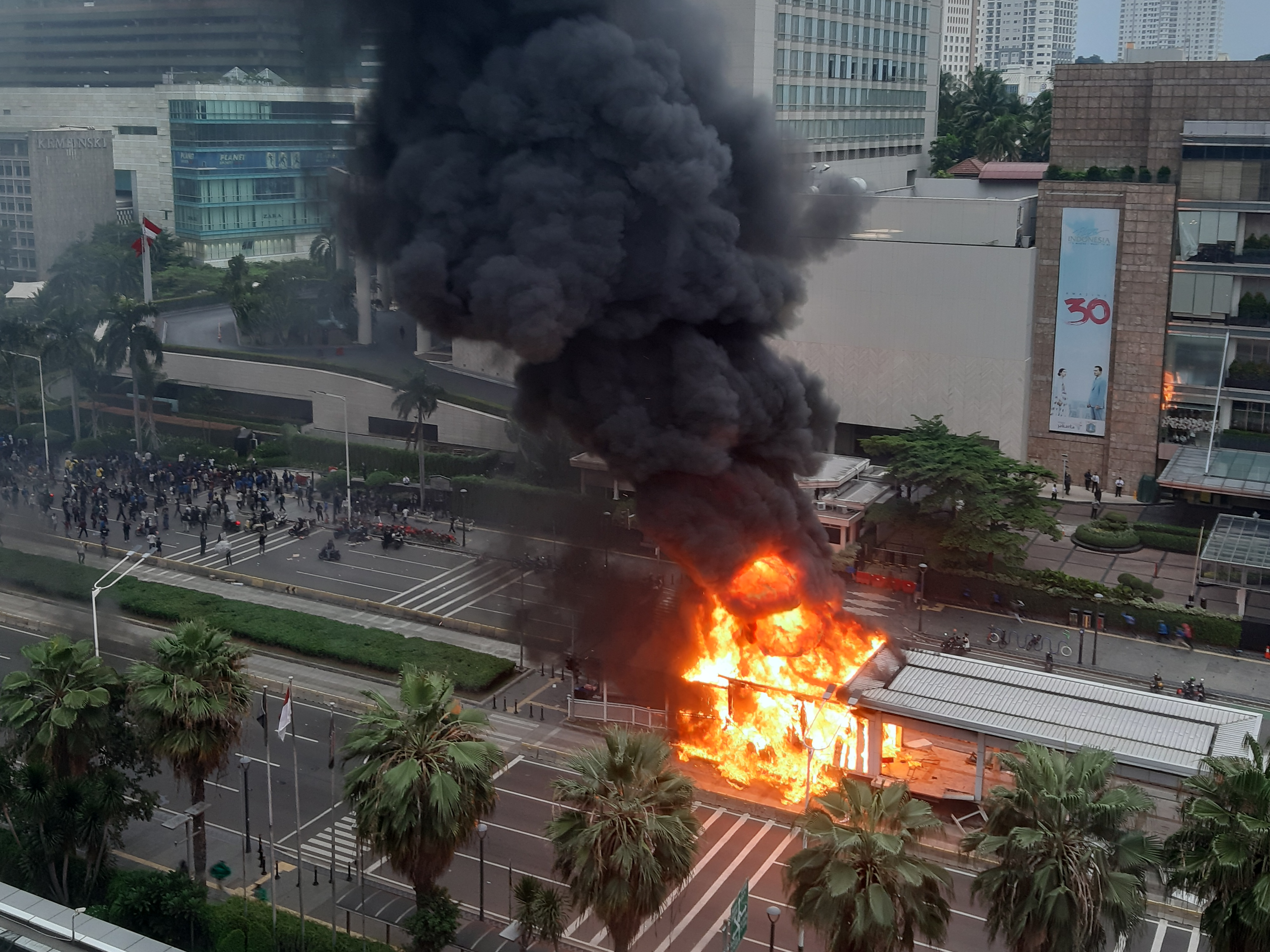
Riots in Jakarta after Omnibus Law protests turned violent

- October 6
  - Protests erupt throughout Indonesia after Indonesian House of Representatives passes controversial job creation bill.
  - At least 35 global investors voiced concerns to President Joko Widodo on the recent passing of the jobs creation bill.
  - Prominent Indonesian journalist Najwa Shihab was filed to the police by supporters of Joko Widodo for "defamation" of the president after an interview in which Najwa questioned an empty chair during a show went viral on social media.
- October 7 - Multiple international labor unions voiced their complaints to President Joko Widodo, urging Indonesian officials to repeal the job creation bill.
- October 9
  - Governor of Jakarta Anies Baswedan announced that rioters had destroyed at least 11 bus stops with at least Rp 25 billion in damage.
  - Indonesian Minister of Education Nadiem Makarim announced that the government would replace the current annually held National Examination (UN) with National Assessment.
- October 13
  - Indonesian Chief Defense Minister Prabowo Subianto was scheduled to meet with U.S. officials. Prabowo, which was banned by the U.S. to enter its territory for more than two decades due to alleged human rights abuses during his time in East Timor, planned to attend a meeting with top U.S. officials in Pentagon.
  - Indonesian Commission for Missing Persons and Victims of Violence voiced their disappointment on the news and Amnesty International voiced concerns on the lifting of the ban, stating that the U.S. might have violated Leahy Law.
- October 15 - A member of the Indonesian Armed Forces, along with his partner, was fired from the military due to homosexuality. Further investigation revealed that a group consisting of members from the LGBTQ+ community had been formed within the Indonesian Armed Forces.
- October 20
  - Indonesia's Students Executive Body held a mass protest in Central Jakarta due to the passing of Omnibus Law bill.
  - Governor of Papua Lukas Enembe renamed Sentani International Airport, the largest airport in the province, after local legislator turned Papuan independence activist Theys Hiyo Eluay.
- October 23 - The Indonesian police declared 8 people as suspects in the massive fire that destroyed the Indonesian Attorney General on August.
- October 24 - A tornado swept through a densely populated residential area in North Bekasi. At least 149 structures were damaged.
- October 26
  - The Indonesian government decided to postpone the development of "Komodo Jurassic Park" at Komodo National Park after a photo went viral on social media, which drew harsh criticisms from the public.
  - Controversial Indonesian Muslim cleric Muhammad Rizieq Shihab announced in a videotape that he will soon return to Indonesia.
- October 28
  - A magnitude 5.3 earthquake on the Richter scale struck Mamuju Regency, West Sulawesi at a shallow depth. At least 1 person was killed in the quake.
  - COVID-19 cases in Indonesia pass 400,000 mark.
- October 30 - Two TNI members were assaulted by a Harley Owner Group (HOG) in Bukittinggi, West Sumatra.
- October 31
  - Jakarta received the 1st winner of the 2021 Sustainable Transport Award, the first ever for the city.
  - President Joko Widodo condemned French President Emmanuel Macron's remarks on Islam, which was deemed as "insult to Islam".

=== November ===
- November 2 - President of Indonesia Joko Widodo officially signs the controversial Omnibus Law bill into law.
- November 5
  - Volcanological Survey of Indonesia raised the alert level of Mount Merapi to the second highest level.
  - Indonesia officially enters an economic recession for the first time since 1998.
- November 7 - Masyumi Reborn Party, a revitalized Islamic party of the former Masyumi Party, was created in Jakarta.
- November 10 - Rizieq Shihab returns to Indonesia through Soekarno–Hatta International Airport.
- November 12 - An international investigation conducted by environmental groups revealed that Korindo Group, a South Korean oil palm company, had caused massive deforestation in Papua for years, causing public outrage on social media.
- November 15 - Indonesia along with 14 other countries signed the Regional Comprehensive Economic Partnership, the largest trade bloc in the world.
- November 21 - The government announced that schools will be allowed to open by January 2021.
- November 23
  - Indonesia will resume the calling of visa process of seven countries, which are Afghanistan, Cameroon, Guinea, Israel, Liberia, Nigeria, North Korea, and Somalia.
  - Indonesia reached a recorded half a million cases of COVID-19.
  - Indonesian Police arrested Upik Lawanga, who has been involved in the 2002 Bali bombings. His role involves constructing bombs to be used in several terror attacks.
- November 25 - Minister of Marine Affairs and Fisheries Edhy Prabowo was arrested for alleged corruption in the awarding of permits to export lobster larvae.
- November 28
  - At least eight unidentified individuals attacked a village in Sigi, Central Sulawesi. Four people were killed, three of whom were beheaded, and six houses were burnt. The Indonesian police treated the incident as a terrorist attack.
  - Police announced that the terror attack in Sigi was perpetrated by Mujahidin Indonesia Timur (MIT), a terror group led by Ali Kalora.
- November 29 - More than 6,000 people evacuated due to the eruption of Mount Ile Ape Lewotolok in Lembata Regency, East Nusa Tenggara. Local airport had to be shut down due to the eruption. The alert level of the volcano was raised by officials to level 3, the second highest level.
- November 30
  - Indonesian National Armed Forces officially launched a manhunt to capture the perpetrators of the Sigi terror attack.
  - At least 10 people were killed after a pile-up in Cipali (Cikopo-Palimanan) Toll Road

=== December ===
- December 1 - Mount Semeru erupted, sending ash as far as 3 km to Lumajang. Hundreds of residents were evacuated due to the eruption.
- December 3 - Indonesia recorded more than 8,000 new cases, the highest daily increase to date.
- December 6 - Minister for Social Affairs Juliari Batubara was arrested for alleged embezzlement of COVID-19 aid and funds.
- December 7
  - At least 6 members of Islamic Defenders Front were shot dead by police after a clash on a Jakarta toll road.
  - President Joko Widodo announced 1.2 million doses of Sinovac COVID-19 vaccine had arrived in Indonesia from China.
- December 9 - Nine provinces, 224 regencies and 34 cities held local elections.
- December 10 - Indonesian Police arrested Zulkarnaen, a high-ranking Jemaah Islamiyah official and leader. He is said to have been the mastermind of several terror attacks, including the 2002 Bali bombings, 2000 Christmas bombings, and 2003 JW Marriott bombing.
- December 11 - COVID-19 cases in Indonesia reached the 600,000 mark.
- December 13 - Officials announced that prominent Muslim cleric Rizieq Shihab was arrested for health protocol violation.
- December 16 - President Joko Widodo announced that public would not be charged for the COVID-19 vaccine, later stated that he would be the first person in Indonesia to be vaccinated.
- December 18 - Supporters of Muslim cleric Habib Rizieq Shihab held demonstrations nationwide in response to the arrest of the cleric.
- December 21 - Germany announced that it would recall one of its embassy's staff back to the country after it was revealed that one of their staff had visited the headquarters of Islamic Defenders Front.
- December 22
  - President Joko Widodo announced a cabinet reshuffle involving six ministerial positions.
  - Reshuffled ministers include Minister of Health, Minister of Social Affairs, Minister of Tourism and Creative Economy, Minister of Fisheries and Maritime Affairs, Minister of Religious Affairs and Minister of Trade.
  - Former Mayor of Surabaya Tri Rismaharini was appointed as the new Minister of Social Affairs, replacing former minister Juliari Batubara who was arrested for suspected COVID-19 aid embezzlement. Deputy Defense Minister Sakti Wahyu Trenggono was appointed as the new Minister of Fisheries and Maritime Affairs, replacing former minister Edhy Prabowo who was arrested for a lobster larvae corruption case. First Deputy Minister of State Owned Enterprises, Budi Gunadi Sadikin, was appointed health minister, replacing Terawan Agus Putranto. Former vice presidential candidate Sandiaga Uno was appointed Tourism and Creative Economy Minister, replacing Wishnutama. Head of the Ansor Youth Movement, Yaqut Cholil Qoumas was appointed Religious Affairs Minister, replacing Fachrul Razi. Indonesia's Ambassador to the United States, Muhammad Luthfi, who has served as trade minister under president Susilo Bambang Yudhoyono, was re-appointed Trade Minister, replacing Agus Suparmanto.
- December 25
  - Newly appointed Minister of Religious Affairs Yaqut Cholil Qoumas said he would provide "affirmative rights" for Indonesian Shiites and Ahmadis.
  - Multiple Muslim organizations including PBNU and MUI asked Religious Affairs Minister Yaqut Cholil Qoumas to clarify his remarks on affirmative rights for Indonesian Shiites and Ahmadis, claiming his remarks may cause tension among some Muslim Indonesians.
  - COVID-19 cases in Indonesia reach 700,000.
- December 28
  - A video parody of the Indonesian national anthem "Indonesia Raya" allegedly made by a Malaysian went viral on YouTube, prompting criticism from some Indonesian netizens.
  - Indonesian Ministry of Foreign Affairs sent letter of protest to Malaysia in response to the parody, and some political parties also condemned the parody.
  - The Malaysian Government condemned the parody and promised to investigate the matter.
- December 30
  - The Indonesian government banned the Islamic Defenders Front (FPI).
  - Indonesian police arrested a high school student in Cianjur, West Java, for making a video parody of Indonesian national anthem Indonesia Raya.

== Deaths ==
=== January ===
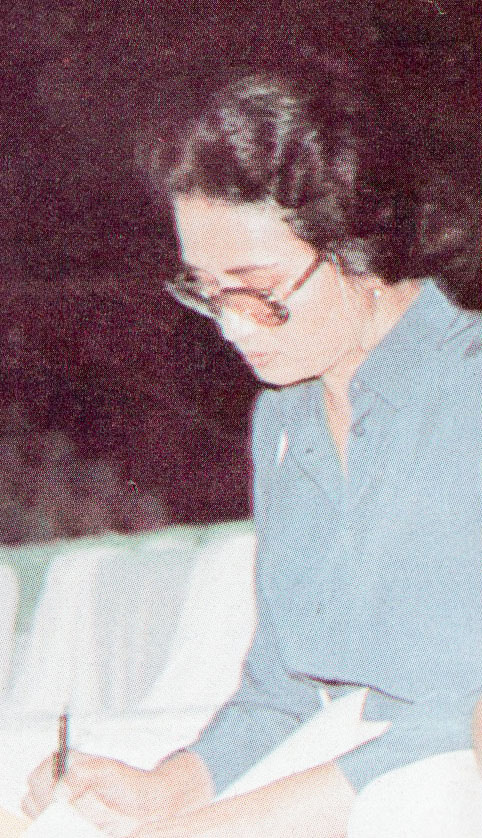
Ade Irawan

- 1 January – Chris Pattikawa, film director and producer (b. 1940).
- 4 January – Gugum Gumbira, gamelan composer and orchestra leader (b. 1945)
- 5 January – Mien Sugandhi, politician (b. 1934).
- 6 January – Ria Irawan, actress (b. 1969).
- 17 January - Ade Irawan, actress (b. 1937)

=== February ===
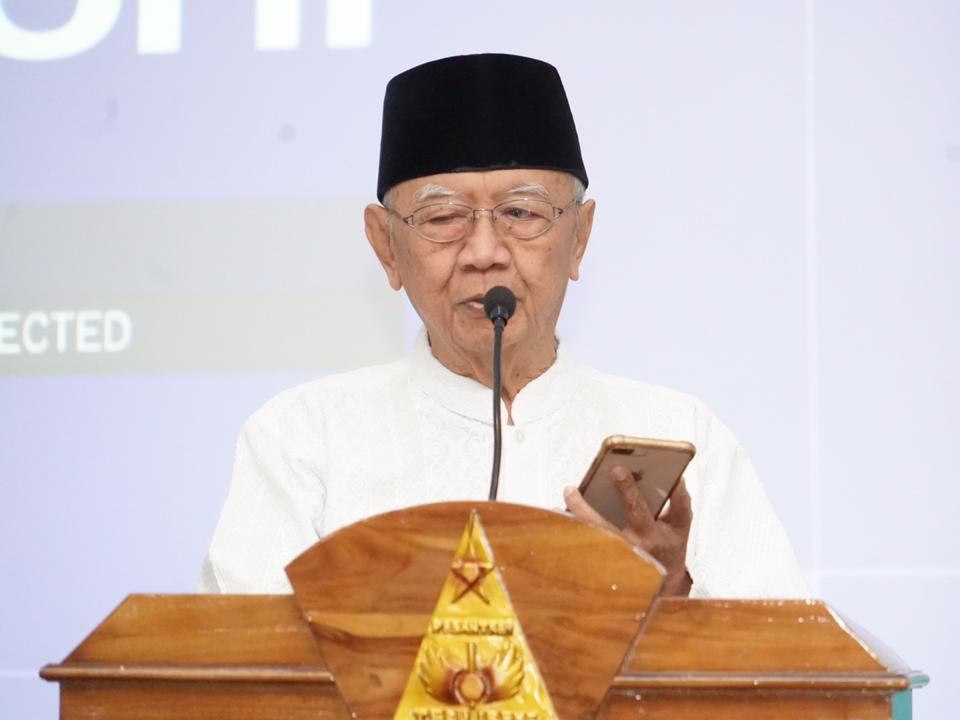
Salahuddin Wahid

- 3 February – Salahuddin Wahid (Gus Sholah), scholar and politician (b. 1942)
- 4 February – Allan Wangsa, presenter and YouTuber (b. 1988)
- 6 February - J. B. Sumarlin, economist and former Minister of Finance (b. 1932)
- 20 February – Ashraf Sinclair, actor (b. 1979)

=== March ===
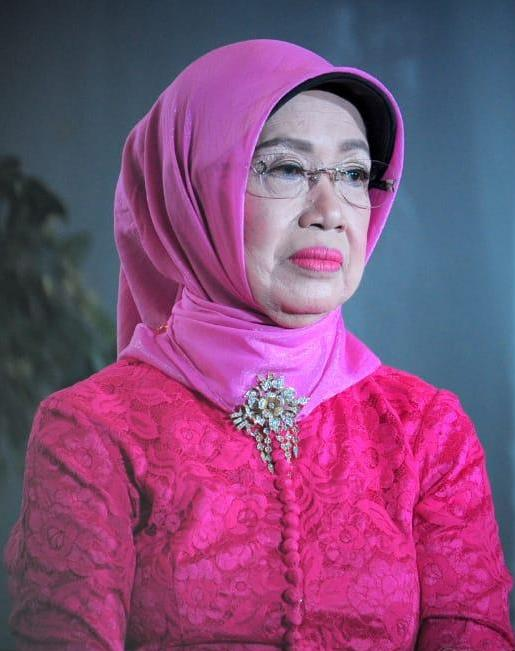
Sudjiatmi

- 5 March - Mila Karmila, actress (b.1943)
- 11 March – Rama Aiphama, singer (b. 1956)
- 23 March - Purwaniatun, actress (b. 1952)
- 25 March - Sudjiatmi Notomihardjo, Mother of Indonesian President Joko Widodo (b. 1943)
- 27 March - Imam Suroso, politician (b.1946)
- 27 March - Gatot Tjahyono, politician (b.1962)
- 31 March - Bob Hasan, businessman (b.1931)

=== April ===
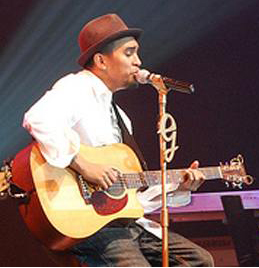
Glenn Fredly

- 2 April - Aptripel Tumimomor, Regent of North Morowali Regency (b. 1966)
- 8 April - Glenn Fredly, singer (b. 1975)
- 17 April - Lukman Niode, athlete (b. 1963)
- 23 April - Andy Ayunir, Film score composer (b.1966)
- 23 April - Arief Budiman, sociologist, older brother of Soe Hok Gie (b.1941)
- 28 April - Syahrul, mayor of Tanjung Pinang (b.1960)

=== May ===
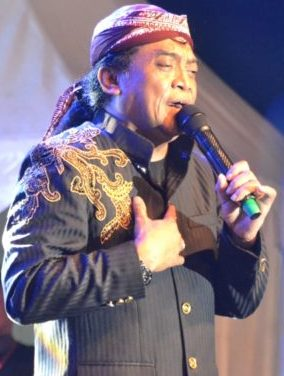
Didi Kempot

- 2 May - Erwin Prasetya, former bassist of Dewa 19 (b.1972)
- 5 May - Didi Kempot, singer (b. 1966)
- 8 May - Adi Kurdi, actor (b.1948)
- 10 May - Djoko Santoso, politician, former Commander of the Indonesian National Armed Forces (b. 1952)
- 15 May - Hengky Solaiman, actor(b.1941)

=== June ===
- 9 June - Benny Likumahuwa, musician (b.1946)
- 13 June - Pramono Edhie Wibowo, former Indonesian Chief of Staff of the Indonesian Army (b.1955)
- 15 June - Prabawati Sukarta, voice actor and radio host (b.1956)
- 30 June - Hilmi Aminuddin, Founder of the Indonesian Prosperous Justice Party (b.1947)

=== July ===
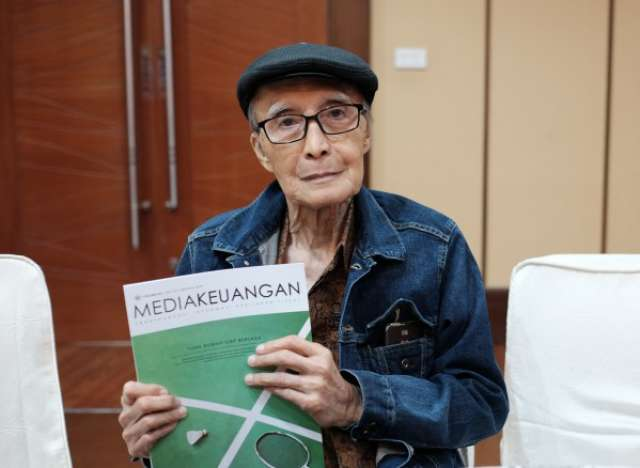
Sapardi Djoko Damono

- 8 July - Usep Romli, writer and journalist (b.1949)
- 10 July - Papa T Bob, songwriter (b.1960)
- 12 July - Nurhasanah Iskandar, voice actress (b.1958)
- 16 July - Omaswati, actress and comedian (b.1966)
- 19 July - Sapardi Djoko Damono, poet (b.1940)
- 29 July - Ajip Rosidi, poet (b.1938)

=== August ===
- 1 August - Hasyim Wahid, politician (b.1953)
- 16 August - Edward Anthony, Vice Regent of Way Kanan Regency (b.1960)
- 27 August - Barli Asmara, designer (b.1978)

=== September ===
- 9 September - Jakob Oetama, journalist (b.1931)
- 17 September - Alwi Shahab, journalist (b.1936)

=== October ===
- 17 October - Pollycarpus Priyanto, pilot who assassinated human rights campaigner Munir (b.1961)

=== November ===
- 3 November - Seno Nugroho, Wayang artist (b. 1972)

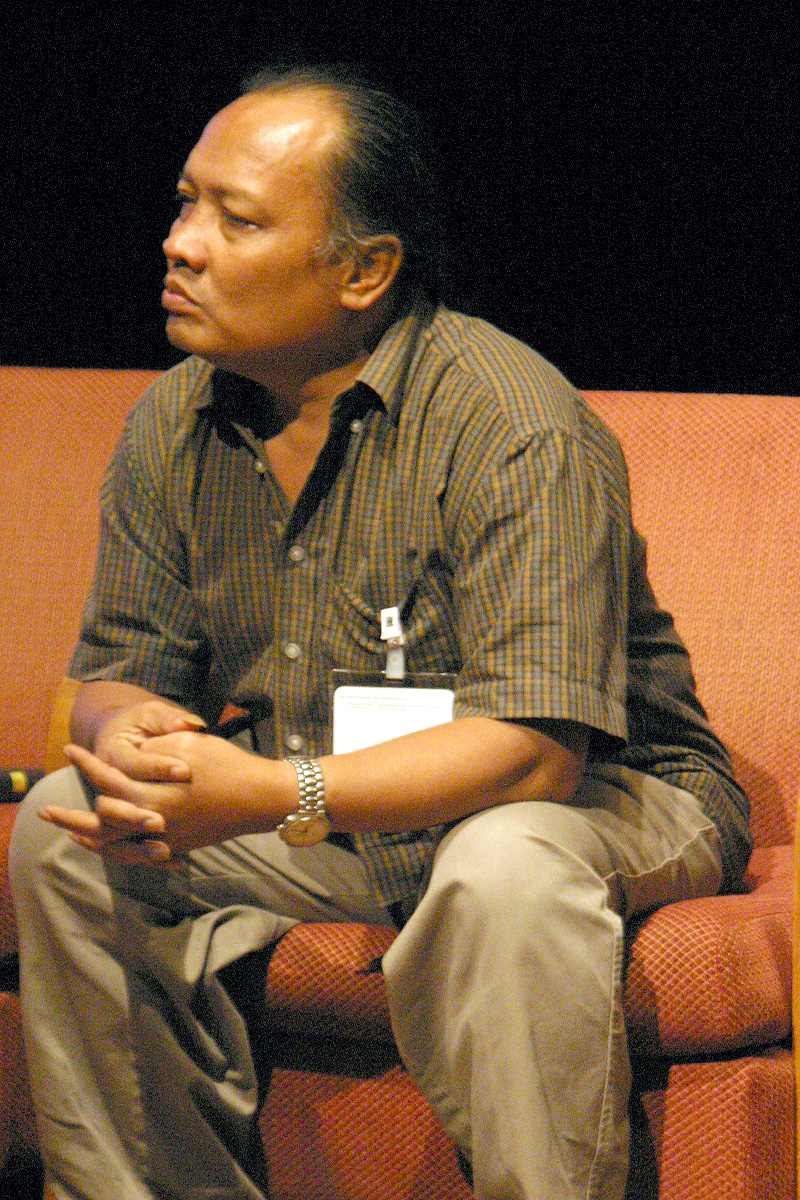
Rahayu Supanggah

- 10 November - Rahayu Supanggah, composer (b. 1949)
- 8 November - Gatot Brajamusti, actor, singer, and former chairman of Indonesian Film Artists Association (b. 1962)
- 21 November - Ricky Yacobi, football player (b. 1963)

=== December ===
- 8 December - Sudjati, Regent of Bulungan Regency (b. 1954)

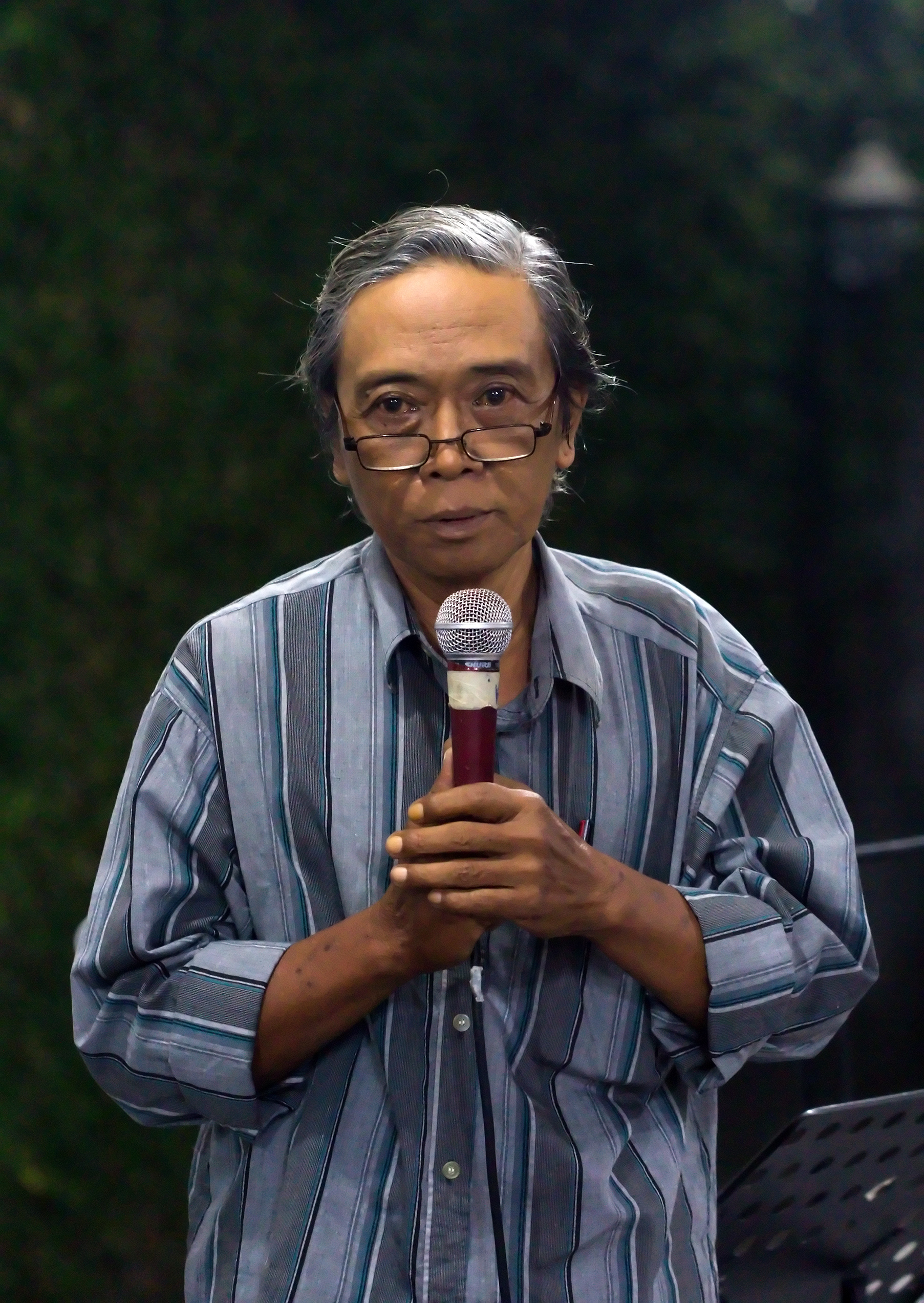
Iman Budhi Santoso

- 10 December - Iman Budhi Santosa, poet (b. 1948)

== See also ==
=== Country overviews ===
- Indonesia
- History of Indonesia
- History of modern Indonesia
- Outline of Indonesia
- Government of Indonesia
- Politics of Indonesia

=== Related timelines for current period ===
- 2020
- 2020 in politics and government
- 2020s
