= Caliadi =

Indonesian bureaucrat (1964–2021)

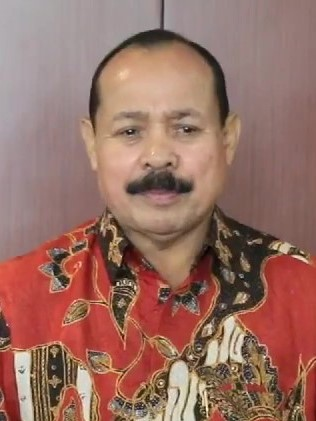
- Caliadi in 2020

Director General for Buddhist Community Guidance
- In office 2 August 2017 – 21 December 2021
- President: Joko Widodo
- Minister: Lukman Hakim Saifuddin; Fachrul Razi; Yaqut Cholil Qoumas
- Preceded by: Dasikin; Nur Syam (acting)
- Succeeded by: Nyoman Suriadarma (acting)

Personal details
- Born: 31 December 1964 Bentek, North Lombok, Indonesia
- Died: 28 December 2021 (aged 56) Gatot Soebroto Army Hospital, Jakarta, Indonesia
- Education: Udayana University

Caliadi (31 December 1964 – 28 December 2021) was an Indonesian bureaucrat who served as the Director General of Buddhist Community Guidance from 2017 to 2021.

== Early life and education ==
Caliadi was born on 31 December 1964 in Bentek, a multireligious village in North Lombok, West Nusa Tenggara. Caliadi obtained an undergraduate degree from the Udayana University in governmental law in 2004.

== Bureaucratic career ==
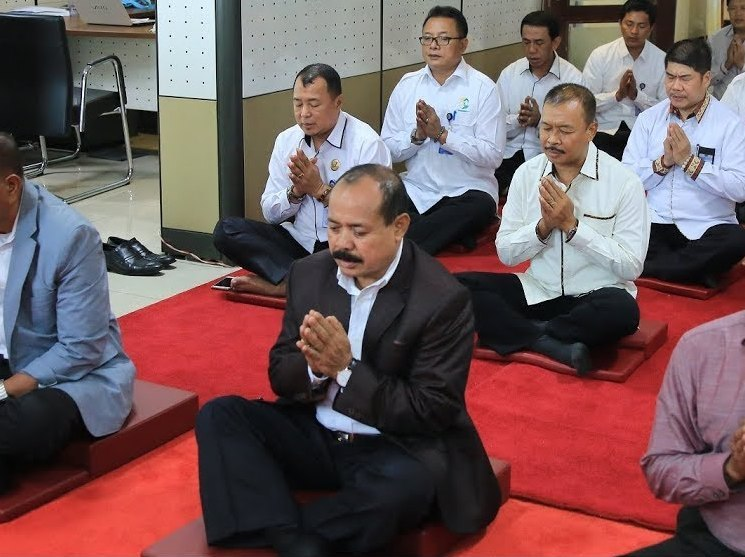
Caliadi, wearing black suit, delivering a Buddhist prayer at the directorate general's anniversary.

Caliadi started his career as a civil servant in 1991. Caliadi was initially placed at the West Nusa Tenggara's religious office, serving as Buddhist education supervisor for the province from 1996 until 2002 and the Buddhist community director from 2002 until 2006. After working in the province for more than a decade, he was moved to the religious ministry's central office. He worked as the head of the counseling and personnel section from 2006 to 2012 and head of the planning and information system from 2012 until 2014.

Caliadi eventually became the secretary of the Directorate General of Buddhist Community Guidance—the second highest position in the directorate general—on 30 April 2014. During his tenure as secretary, Caliadi was chosen by Buddhist organizations as a Buddhist representative to resolve a religious feud in North Sumatra which resulted in the arson of several Buddhist temples.

Two years after his appointment as secretary, the Director General of Buddhist Community Guidance Dasikin was named a suspect in a corruption case. Dasikin was immediately suspended from his office and a selection process was held to fill the nominally vacant post. Caliadi was named as a prospective candidate for the office. Caliadi was selected for the post by the minister and he was installed on 2 December 2017.

As director general, Caliadi was involved in the establishment of a state-managed Buddhist academy in West Jakarta. He was also instrumental in the creation of a long-term plan for the directorate general. Aside from bureaucratic management, Caliadi was also tasked by the minister of religious affairs to develop the Borobudur temple into a world center for Buddhism.

On 21 December 2021, Caliadi was informed regarding his dismissal by the ministry via a WhatsApp message by the personnel bureau. Although the secretary general of the ministry insisted that his dismissal was a routine office change, Caliadi stated that the minister has dishonorably fired him. Caliadi, along with other non-Muslim directors general who were affected by the dismissal, enquired about their dismissals to the minister as well as President Joko Widodo. He also stated his plans to take legal action against the minister Yaqut Cholil Qoumas through the civil servant commission and the administrative court.

== Personal life and death ==
Caliadi died at Gatot Soebroto Army Hospital in Jakarta, on the morning of 28 December 2021, three days before his 57th birthday. Prior to his death, Caliadi had suffered from various complications related to blood pressure, as well as heart and kidney disease.
