= Yassierli =

Indonesian politician (born 1976)

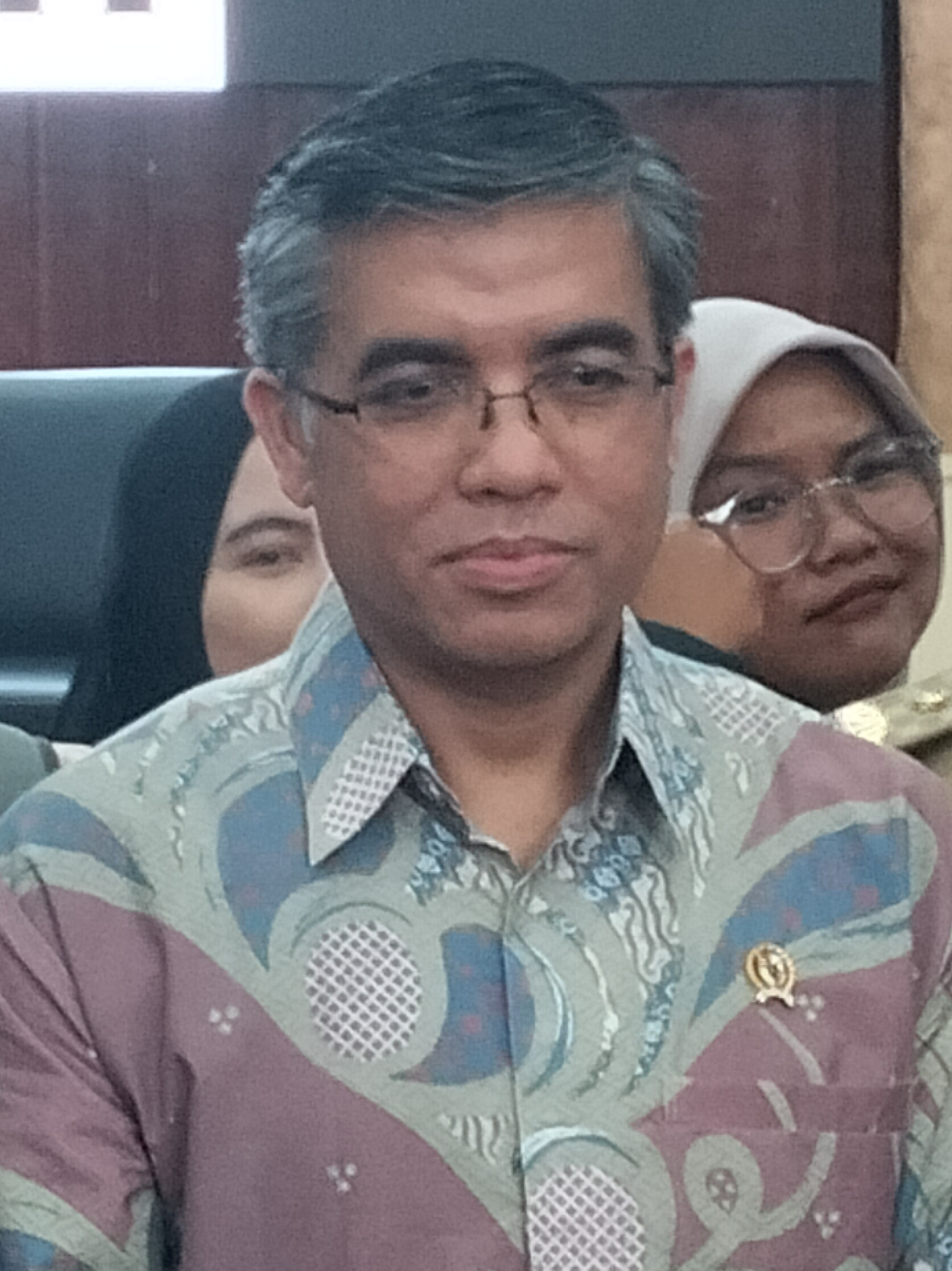
- Yassierli, 2025

28th Minister of Manpower
- Incumbent
- Assumed office 21 October 2024
- President: Prabowo Subianto
- Deputy: Immanuel Ebenezer (2024–25); Afriansyah Noor (2025–present)
- Preceded by: Ida Fauziyah

Personal details
- Born: 22 April 1976 (age 50) Padang, Indonesia
- Party: Independent
- Education: Bandung Institute of Technology (Ir., S.T., M.T.); Virginia Polytechnic Institute and State University (PhD)
- Occupation: Politician; academician

Academic background
- Thesis: Muscle Fatigue during Isometric and Dynamic Efforts in Shoulder Abduction and Torso Extension: Age Effects and Alternative Electromyographic Measures (2005)
- Doctoral advisor: Maury A. Nussbaum

Academic work
- Discipline: Engineering
- Sub-discipline: Industrial engineering

Yassierli (born 22 April 1976) is an Indonesian academic and politician serving as Minister of Manpower since 2024. He has worked at the Bandung Institute of Technology since 1998.

== Early life ==
He is an alumnus of SMA Negeri 1 Padang, graduated in 1993 and came from Lubuk Minturun, nephew of the late Aziz Syoeib, a former pediatrician. He took his undergraduate education at ITB majoring in Engineering in 1993-1997. Then he continued his Masters education at ITB majoring in Industrial Engineering and Management in 1998-2000. After that, he took a doctoral degree in Industrial and Systems Engineering, Virginia Tech, USA, in 2001-2005. Currently, Yassierli works as a teaching staff and researcher at the Faculty of Industrial Technology ITB.
