= Hanif Dhakiri =

Indonesian politician (born 1972)

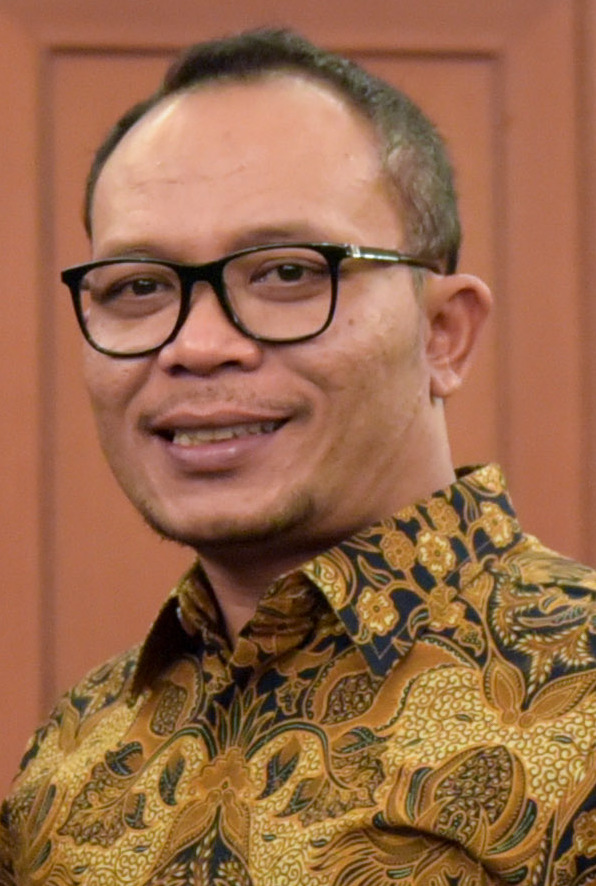
- Hanif in 2017

26th Minister of Manpower
- In office 27 October 2014 – 20 October 2019
- President: Joko Widodo
- Preceded by: Muhaimin Iskandar
- Succeeded by: Ida Fauziyah

Minister of Youth and Sports Acting
- In office 20 September 2019 – 20 October 2019
- President: Joko Widodo
- Preceded by: Imam Nahrawi
- Succeeded by: Zainudin Amali

Menber of the House of Representatives
- Incumbent
- Assumed office 1 October 2024
- Constituency: Central Java X
- In office 1 October 2009 – 27 October 2014
- Succeeded by: Yaqut Cholil Qoumas
- Constituency: Central Java X

Personal details
- Born: Muhammad Hanif Dhakiri; 6 June 1972 (age 52); Semarang, Central Java, Indonesia
- Political party: PKB

Muhammad Hanif Dhakiri (born 6 June 1972) is an Indonesian politician who currently serves as Member of the House of Representatives for Central Java X since 2024, a post he also served from 2009 to 2014. He previously served as Minister of Manpower in the Working Cabinet from 2014 to 2019. He was a member of the People's Representative Council of Indonesia from 2009 to 2014 appointed through the National Awakening Party.
