= Ministry of Manpower (Indonesia) =

Government ministry of Indonesia

- Kementerian Ketenagakerjaan
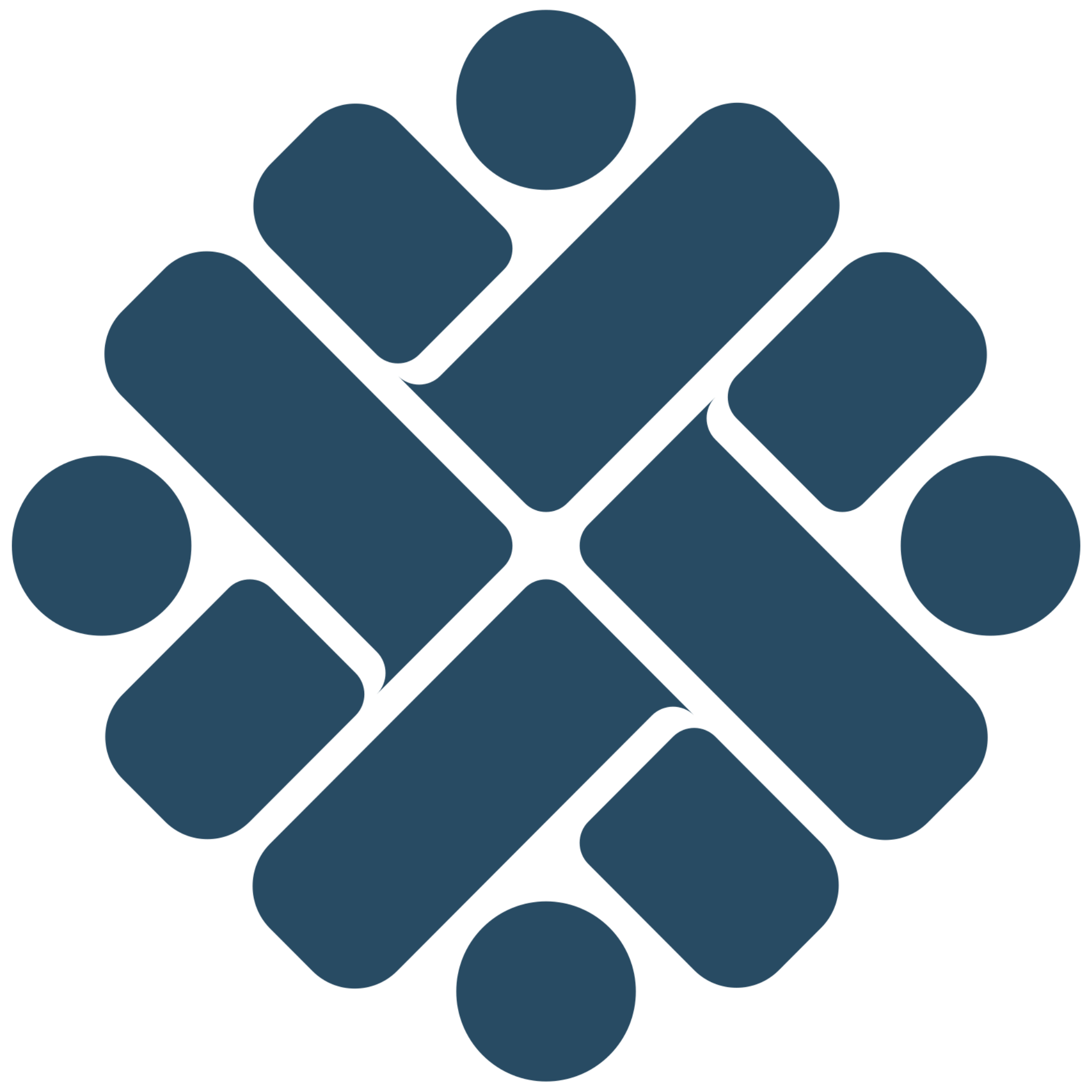
- Logo of the Ministry of Manpower

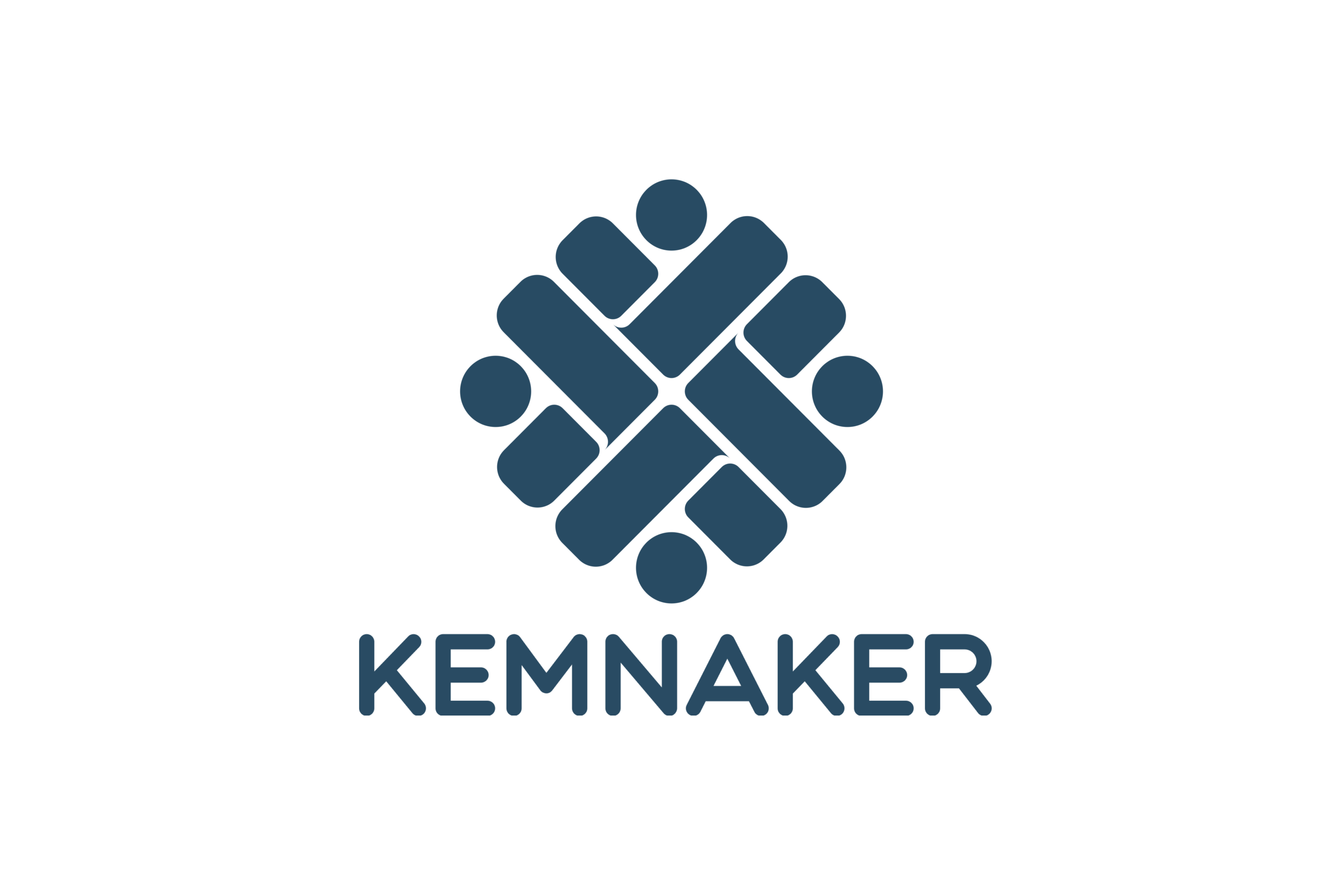
- Flag of the Ministry of Manpower

- Ministry of Manpower headquarters

Ministry overview
- Formed: 3 July 1947; 79 years ago
- Jurisdiction: Government of Indonesia
- Headquarters: Jl. Jendral Gatot Subroto Kav. 51, Daerah Khusus Ibukota Jakarta Selatan 12750 Jakarta, Indonesia
- Minister responsible: Yassierli, Minister of Manpower; '
- Deputy Minister responsible: Afriansyah Noor, Deputy Minister of Manpower
- Website: www.kemnaker.go.id

The Ministry of Manpower (Indonesian: Kementerian Ketenagakerjaan) of the Republic of Indonesia is a government ministry responsible for the workers and labour laws of Indonesia. The minister is currently Yassierli since 21 October 2024.

== History ==
The Ministry of Manpower was founded in 1947, two years after independence, after sections of the Ministry of Social Affairs were separated in accordance with Government Regulation 3 signed on July 27 that year to form the ministry, which is responsible for the implementation of state policies on the labor sector. The first minister was S. K. Trimurti, who reported to Prime Minister Amir Sjarifuddin, who was faced with the huge job of preparing national policies and programs to help the labor force cope with the then ongoing National Revolution.

== Organization ==
Building of Ministry of Manpower on Gatot Subroto Street, Jakarta.

Based on Presidential Decree No. 164/2024, and as expanded by Ministry of Manpower Decrees Nos. 1/2021, 1/2022, 14/2023, and 1/2024, the Ministry of Manpower consisted of:

- Office of the Deputy Minister
- Secretariat General for Manpower
- Directorate General of Vocational Training Fostering and Productivity Development (Directorate General I)
  - Directorate General of Vocational Training Fostering and Productivity Development Secretariat
  - Directorate of Vocational Training Institutions Fostering
  - Directorate of Training Instructors and Personnel Fostering
  - Directorate of Productivity Development
  - Directorate of Competency Standardization Fostering and Training Programs
  - Directorate of Vocational Training and Internship
  - Secretariate of the National Agency for Professional Certification
  - Institutes for Vocational Training and Productivity (Medan, Serang, Bekasi, Bandung, Semarang, Makassar)
  - Class I Centers for Vocational Training and Productivity (Banda Aceh, Padang, Surakarta, Samarinda, Kendari, Ternate, Ambon, and Sorong)
  - Class II Centers for Vocational Training and Productivity (West Bandung, East Lombok, Bantaeng, Sidoarjo, Banyuwangi, Pangkajene, and Belitung)
  - Vocational Training and Productivity Servicing Units (Sawahlunto, Sofifi, Pekanbaru, Lubuk Linggau, Lampung, Bengkulu, Mamuju, Majene, Palu, Bantul, Kupang, Jayapura, and Jambi)
- Directorate General of Development of Workforce Placement and Expansion of Job Opportunities
  - Directorate General of Vocational Training Fostering and Productivity Development Secretariat
  - Directorate of Domestic Work Placement
  - Directorate of Work Opportunities Expansion
  - Directorate of Migrant Workers Placement Fostering
  - Directorate of Work Introduction
  - Directorate of Foreign Worker Control
  - Indonesian Institute of Work Opportunities Expansion, West Bandung
  - Institute of Work Opportunities Expansion (Bekasi and Kendari)
  - Work Opportunities Expansion Unit, Dumai
- Directorate General of Industrial Relations Development and Workers' Social Security
  - Directorate General of Industrial Relations Development and Workers' Social Security Secretariat
  - Directorate of Work Relationship and Remuneration
  - Directorate of Industrial Mediators Fostering
  - Directorate of Workers' Social Security
  - Directorate of Institutional Affairs and Industrial Disputes Prevention
  - Directorate of Industrial Disputes Resolution
- Directorate General of Labor Inspection Development and Occupational Safety and Health
  - Directorate General of Labor Inspection Development and Occupational Safety and Health Secretariat
  - Directorate of Labor Inspection System Fostering
  - Directorate of Institutional Fostering for Occupational Safety and Health
  - Directorate of Work Norms Investigation Fostering
  - Directorate of Occupational Safety and Health Testing Fostering
  - Directorate of Work Inspectors and Occupational Safety and Health Assessors Fostering
  - Indonesian Institute of Occupational Safety and Health, Jakarta
  - Centers of Occupational Safety and Health (Bandung, Medan, Samarinda, and Makassar)
- Inspectorate General
- Employment Planning and Development Center
  - Center of Manpower Data, Information, and Technology
  - Center of Manpower Policies Development
  - Center of Manpower Planning
- Center for Manpower Human Resource Development
  - Indonesian Manpower Polytechnic, East Jakarta
- Center for Labor Market
- Board of Experts
  - Senior Expert to the Minister for Manpower Economics
  - Senior Expert to the Minister for International Relations
  - Senior Expert to the Minister for Inter-Institutional Relations
  - Senior Expert to the Minister for Social, Politics, and Public Policies

== Ministers ==
No	Took office	Left office	Name
1	3 July 1947	29 January 1948	Soerastri Karma Trimurti
2	29 January 1948	21 January 1950	Kusnan
	19 December 1948	13 July 1949	Sutan Rasjid (Assistant)
	20 December 1949	21 January 1950	Wilopo (Assistant)
3	21 January 1950	6 September 1950	Ma'as
4	6 September 1950	27 April 1951	Soeroso
5	27 April 1951	30 July 1953	Iskandar Tedjasukmana
6	30 July 1953	3 March 1956	Sutan Muchtar Abidin
7	24 March 1956	14 March 1957	Sabilal Rasjad
8	9 April 1957	10 July 1959	Samjono
9	10 July 1959	27 August 1964	Ahem Erningpradja
10	27 August 1964	28 March 1966	Sutomo
11	28 March 1966	6 June 1968	Awaluddin Djamin
12	16 June 1968	11 September 1971	Mursalin Daeng Mamangung
13	11 September 1971	28 March 1973	Mohammad Sadli
14	28 March 1973	29 March 1978	Subroto
15	29 March 1978	19 March 1983	Harun Al Rasyid Zain
16	19 March 1983	21 March 1988	Sudomo
17	21 March 1988	17 March 1993	Cosmas Batubara
18	17 March 1993	16 March 1998	Abdul Latief
19	16 March 1998	21 May 1998	Theo L. Sambuaga
20	21 May 1998	27 September 1999	Fahmi Idris
21	1 October 1999	20 October 1999	A.M. Hendropriyono (Interim)
22	26 October 1999	23 August 2000	Bomer Pasaribu
23	23 August 2000	9 August 2001	Al Hilal Hamdi
24	10 August 2001	20 October 2004	Jacob Nuwa Wea
25	21 October 2004	5 December 2005	Fahmi Idris
26	5 December 2005	20 October 2009	Erman Soeparno
27	22 October 2009	1 October 2014	Muhaimin Iskandar
28	1 October 2014	20 October 2014	Armida Salsiah Alisjahbana (Interim)
29	27 October 2014	20 October 2019	Hanif Dhakiri
29	23 October 2019	30 September 2024	Ida Fauziyah
30	21 October 2024		Yassierli
