= Tabligh Akbar =

Indonesian religious event

Tabligh Akbar is a large-scale Qur'anic recitation event or mass religious meeting held throughout the Indonesian archipelago. The event often accompanies khutbah (sermon), preaching, and dawah (proselytizing). The scale of Tabligh Akbar can vary, from the local level which fits within the local mosques, to the national level which rallies thousands of participants. Tabligh Akbar of the latter kind often disseminate their information widely throughout the social media and performed in a national level mosques or stadiums.
