= Seno Nugroho =

Indonesian artist (1972–2020)

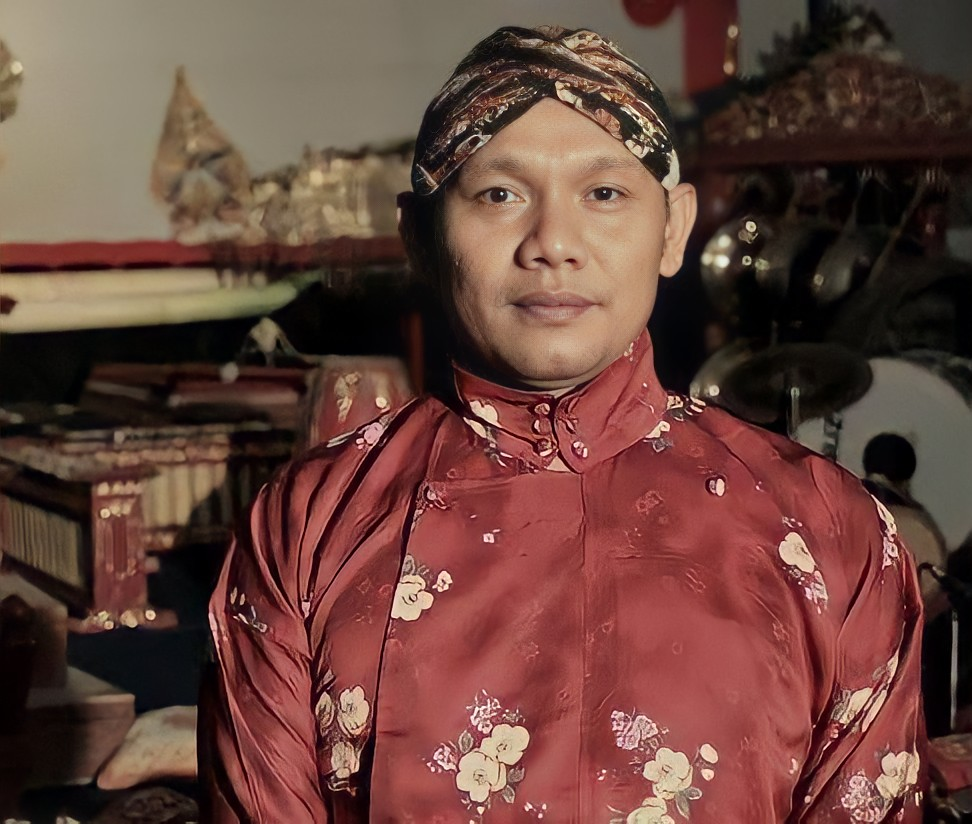
- Born: 23 August 1972; Yogyakarta, Indonesia
- Died: 3 November 2020 (aged 48); Sleman, Indonesia
- Occupation: Puppeteer

Seno Nugroho (Javanese: ꦑꦶꦯꦺꦤꦟꦸꦒꦿꦲ; 23 August 1972 – 3 November 2020) was an Indonesian artist and puppeteer. His name is widely known as the puppeteer through the wayang kulit performance that combines the Surakarta gagrag and the Yogyakarta gagrag. Another peculiarity that has made him famous is when he presents panakawan (Semar, Garèng, Pétruk, Bagong) with jokes that are spontaneous, contextual, actual, and funny. Apart from performing in Indonesia, Seno Nugroho has also been invited to perform in the Netherlands and Belgium.

== Biography ==
Seno Nugroho was born in Yogyakarta, 23 August 1972. He comes from a family of shadow puppeteers. His great-grandfather was the puppeteer of Pura Pakualaman's servant, Ki Jayeng, while his grandfather was the puppeteer Ki Cermo Bancak, who later had the son Ki Suparman Cermo Wiyoto, the father of Ki Seno Nugroho. Seno Nugroho began to cultivate puppetry at the age of 10, and started his career as a puppeteer at the age of 15, while still attending the Yogyakarta Arts High School. His admiration for the figure of Ki Manteb Soedharsono made him interested in puppetry and continued to wrestle with it. Until the end of his life, Seno did not yet have his own puppet studio, but occasionally several people from abroad learned how to perform puppetry with him. He also has his own musical group called Wargo Laras with approximately 50 members.

Seno Nugroho died on November 3, 2020, at 22:15 WIB at the PKU Muhammadiyah Gamping Hospital, Sleman, Yogyakarta, due to a heart attack, while cycling in the streets. On November 4, 2020, Seno Nugroho's body was buried at the Semaki Gede Public Cemetery, Umbulharjo District, Yogyakarta City.
