= Ida Fauziyah =

Indonesian politician (born 1969)

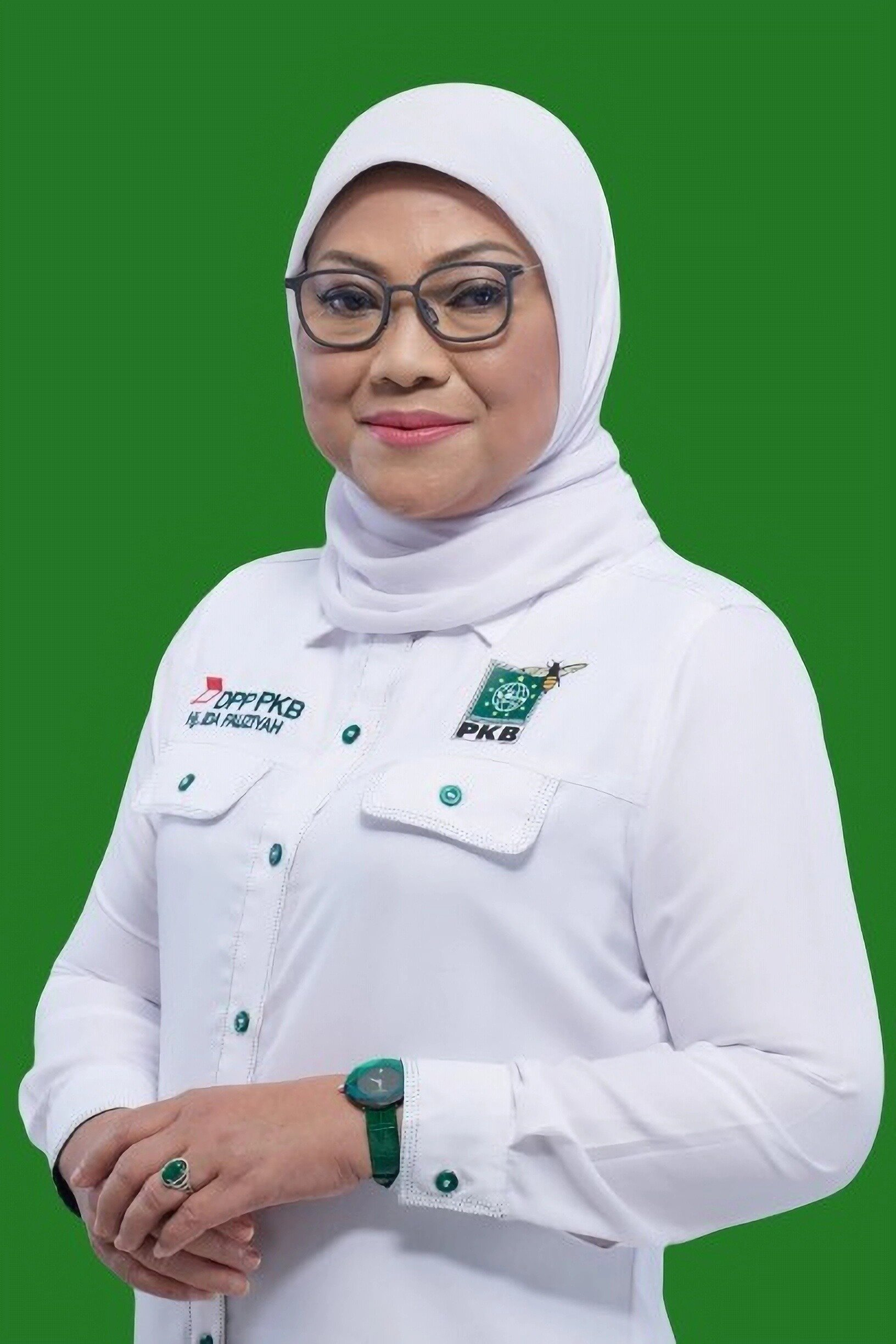

27th Minister of Manpower
- In office 23 October 2019 – 1 October 2024
- President: Joko Widodo
- Deputy: Afriansyah Noor (2022–24)
- Preceded by: Hanif Dhakiri
- Succeeded by: Airlangga Hartarto (Interim)

Menber of the House of Representatives
- Incumbent
- Assumed office 1 Oktober 2024
- Constituency: Jakarta II
- In office 1 October 1999 – 20 March 2018
- Succeeded by: Anwar Rachman
- Constituency: East Java (1999—2004); East Java VIII (2004—2018)

Personal details
- Born: 17 July 1969 (age 57) Mojokerto, East Java, Indonesia
- Party: PKB
- Spouse: Taufiq R. Abdullah
- Children: 2
- Education: Sunan Ampel State Islamic University Surabaya Satyagama University Institute of Home Affairs Governance
- Website: www.idafauziyah.com

Ida Fauziyah (born 17 July 1969) is an Indonesian politician, teacher and women's rights activist of Javanese descent who currently serves as Member of the House of Representatives for Jakarta II since 2024. She previously served as Minister of Manpower in the 41st Cabinet of Indonesia from 2019 to 2024. She is a member of the National Awakening Party.

== Political career ==
Fauziyah worked as a high school teacher before serving as a lawmaker in parliament from 1999 to 2018. She also served as leader of the women’s branch of the Nahdlatul Ulama, Indonesia’s biggest Muslim group.

Ahead of the 2019 general election, Fauziyah became part of Joko Widodo’s parliamentary campaign in charge of gathering women’s votes.

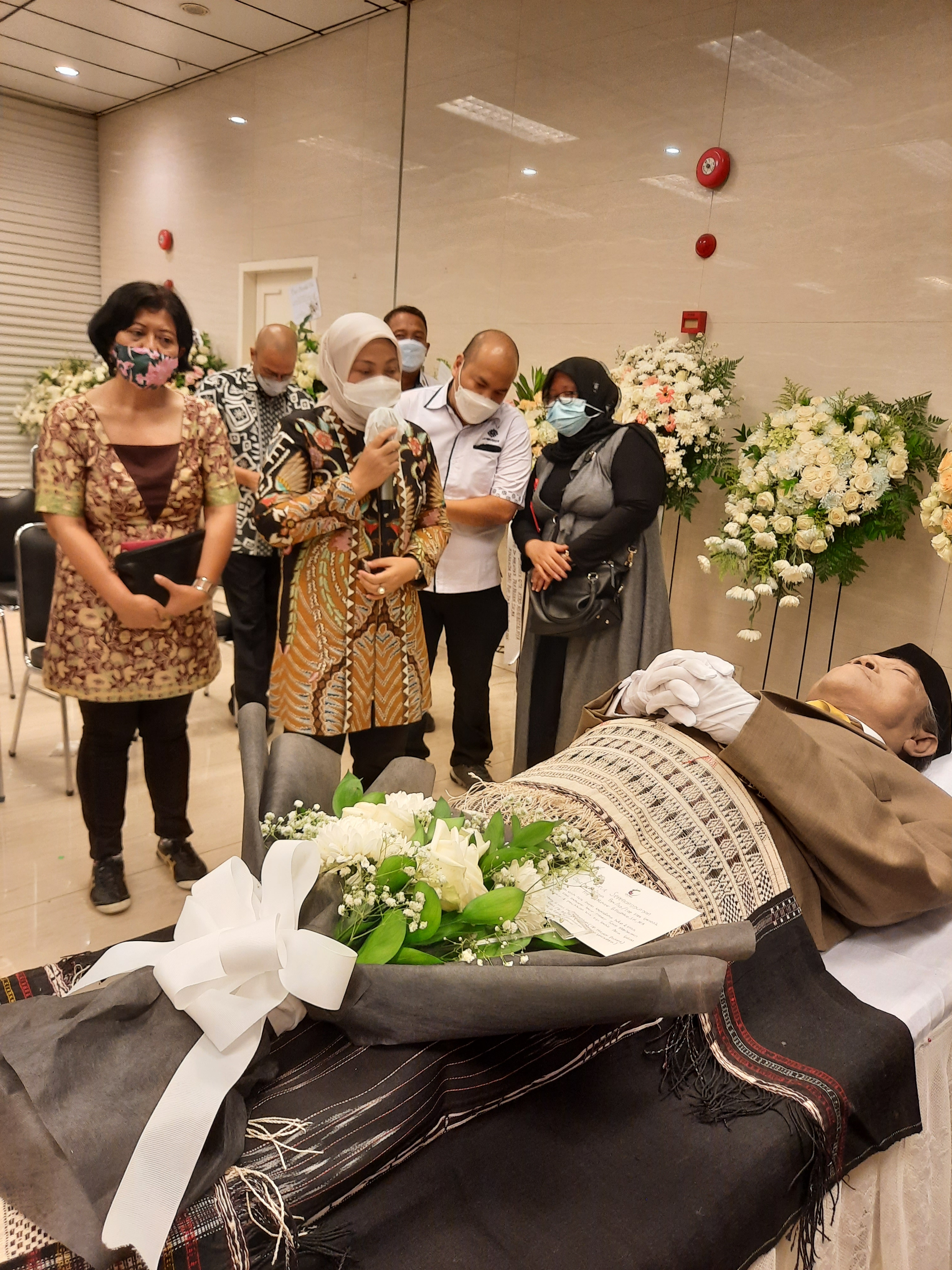
Fauziyah delivering a speech at the funeral of former labour leader Muchtar Pakpahan, 2021.

During her time in government, Fauziyah notably led efforts to lift a temporary freeze on sending its migrant workers to Malaysia in 2022, after both countries ironed out concerns surrounding workers' rights.

Since 2023, Fauziyah has been a member of the United Nations High-Level Panel on the Teaching Profession, co-chaired by Kersti Kaljulaid and Paula-Mae Weekes.

== Personal life ==
On 3 December 2020, Fauziyah was tested positive for COVID-19. She was the fourth minister in the Onward Indonesia Cabinet to be declared COVID-19 positive after Minister of Transportation Budi Karya Sumadi, Minister of Maritime Affairs and Fisheries Edhy Prabowo (resigned due to corruption), and Minister of Religion Affairs Fachrul Razi.
