= Yaqut Cholil Qoumas =

Indonesian politician (born 1975)

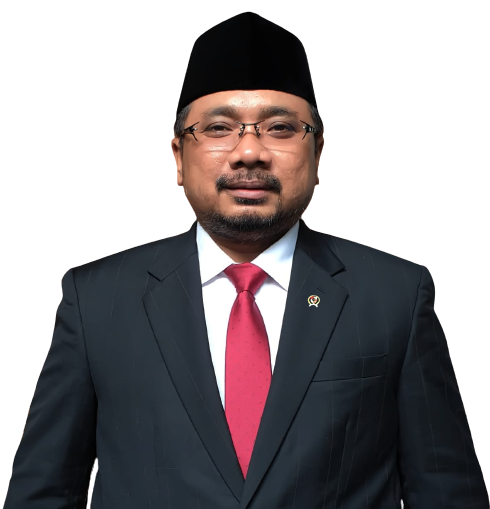
- Official portrait, 2020

24th Minister of Religious Affairs
- In office 23 December 2020 – 20 October 2024
- President: Joko Widodo
- Deputy: Zainut Tauhid Sa'adi (2020–23); Saiful Rahmat Dasuki (2023–24)
- Preceded by: Fachrul Razi
- Succeeded by: Nasaruddin Umar

General Chairman of GP Ansor
- In office 27 November 2015 – 2 February 2024
- Preceded by: Nusron Wahid
- Succeeded by: Addin Jauharudin

Member of the House of Representatives
- In office 27 January 2015 – 23 December 2020; Interim replacement until 30 September 2019
- Preceded by: Hanif Dhakiri
- Succeeded by: M. F. Nurhuda Yusro
- Constituency: Central Java X

Deputy Regent of Rembang
- In office 2005–2010
- Preceded by: Nasirul Mahasin
- Succeeded by: Abdul Hafidz

Personal details
- Born: 4 January 1975 (age 51) Rembang, Central Java, Indonesia
- Party: PKB
- Spouse: Eny Retno Yaqut
- Children: 3
- Parents: K.H. Muhammad Cholil Bisri (father); Nyai Muhsinah (mother)
- Relatives: Yahya Cholil Staquf (brother); Mustofa Bisri (uncle)

Yaqut Cholil Qoumas (born 4 January 1975) is an Indonesian cleric and politician who served as Minister of Religious Affairs under President Joko Widodo from 2020 to 2024. He previously chaired the Ansor Youth Movement and was a member of the House of Representatives, both between 2015 and 2020.

== Early life ==
Yaqut was born in Rembang Regency on 4 January 1975, and completed his basic education there, graduating from public schools. He studied sociology in the University of Indonesia, but did not complete his bachelor's degree. During his time at UI, he founded the Depok branch of the Indonesian Islamic Students Association (PMII), and chaired it between 1996 and 1999.

== Career ==
=== GP Ansor ===
After his time in UI, he joined the National Awakening Party, and between 2001 and 2004 he served as the chairman of the party's Rembang branch. He was elected to the municipal legislature following the 2004 elections and the following year he was elected vice-regent of Rembang, where he served until 2010. He ran as a candidate in Rembang's 2010 regency election, but lost.

After the electoral loss, Yaqut was elected as a chair in the Ansor Youth Movement (GP Ansor) in 2011. In the 2014 legislative election, Yaqut ran as a candidate in the Central Java 10th electoral district, but failed to win a seat. On 27 January 2015, Yaqut was appointed as a replacement to Muhammad Hanif Dhakiri in the People's Representative Council, as Dhakiri had been appointed as Minister of Labor and Transmigration in Joko Widodo's cabinet. On 27 November 2015, Yaqut was elected as General Chairman of GP Ansor. He was reelected to the legislature following the 2019 election.

In 2016, Yaqut Said that the Ansor Youth Movement (GP Ansor) rejected same-sex marriage, but respects LGBT people as human beings. "As a religion, Islam has its own moral position on this matter and cannot be forced to change that moral position to comply with the will of others, just as we cannot force others to follow the moral position of Islam." said the General Chairperson of the Central Leadership of the Youth Movement Ansor, Yaqut Cholil Qoumas in Jakarta (16/2). He stated, on the one hand, Islam has a moral position in responding to this group. However, on the other hand, he also cannot force LGBT people to follow the moral perspective of Islam.

During the 2017 Jakarta gubernatorial election, Yaqut endorsed Basuki Tjahaja Purnama, referring to the Christian governor as the "Sunan" of Kalijodo. Under Yaqut, GP Ansor endorsed Joko Widodo in the 2019 Indonesian presidential election. In September 2019, Yaqut visited Vatican City and met with Pope Francis, where he represented GP Ansor to express the organization's support for the Document on Human Fraternity.

=== Minister ===
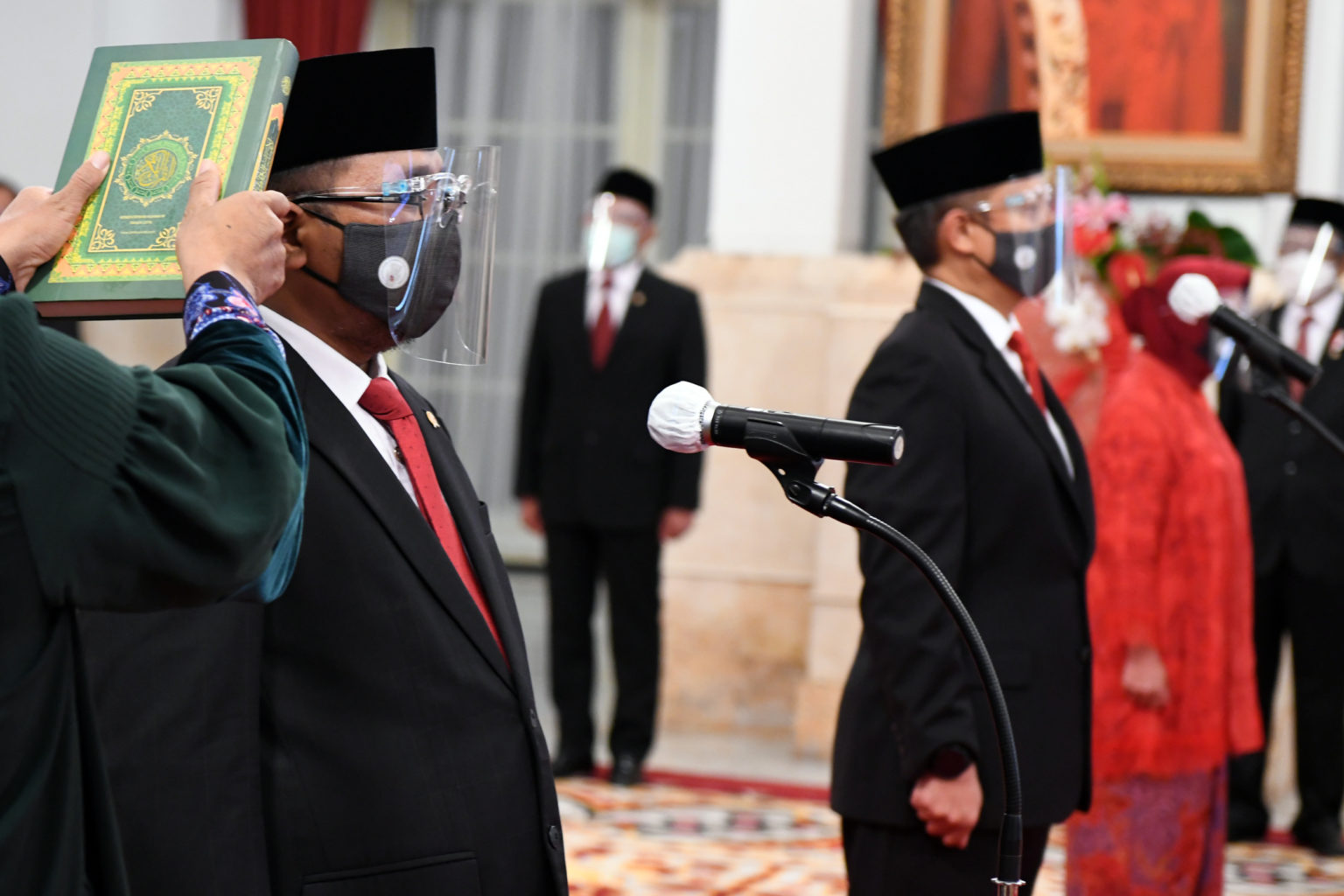
Yaqut being sworn into office.

On 22 December 2020, it was announced that Yaqut had been appointed as Minister of Religious Affairs in Joko Widodo's Onward Indonesia Cabinet, surprising political analysts which had expected either his brother Yahya Cholil Staquf or Ambassador to Saudi Arabia Agus Maftuh Abegebriel. After he was sworn in on 23 December, he made a statement vowing to protect the rights of Shia and Ahmadiyya communities in Indonesia, which face persecution in Indonesia. He additionally described his intent to prevent the spread of Islamic populism in Indonesia. He remained as GP Ansor chairman during his tenure, until Addin Jauharudin was elected as the new chairman on 2 February 2024.
