= Fachrul Razi =

Indonesian politician and retired army officer (born 1947)

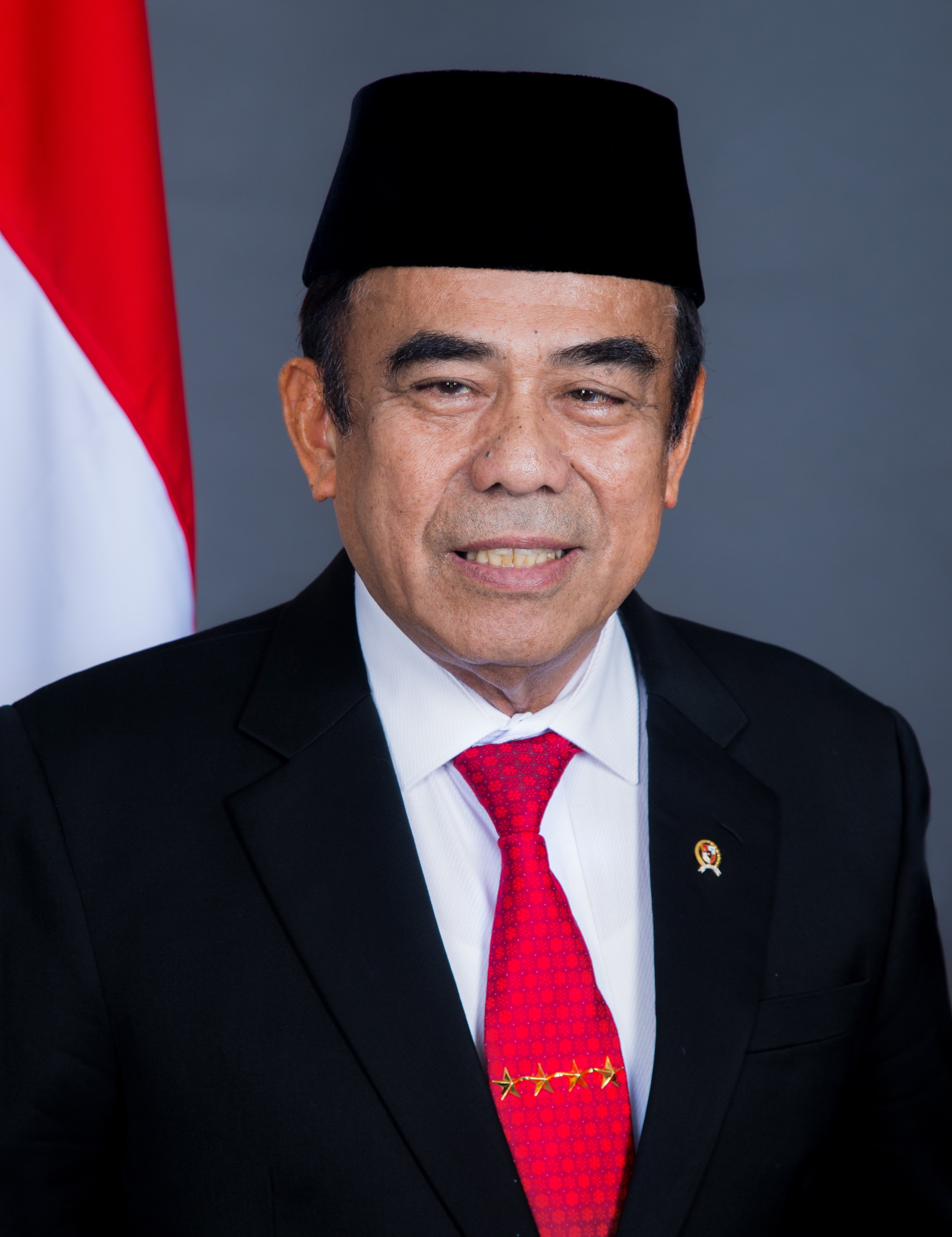
- Portrait in 2019 as Minister of Religious Affairs

23rd Minister for Religious Affairs
- In office 23 October 2019 – 23 December 2020
- President: Joko Widodo
- Vice President: Ma'ruf Amin
- Preceded by: Lukman Hakim Saifuddin
- Succeeded by: Yaqut Cholil Qoumas

Deputy Commander of the Indonesian National Armed Forces
- In office 26 October 1999 – 20 September 2000
- Preceded by: Widodo A. S.
- Succeeded by: Tandyo Budi Revita (2025)

Personal details
- Born: 26 July 1947 (age 78) Kutaradja, Sumatra, Indonesia
- Party: Hanura
- Spouse: Anni Sulistiowati

Military service
- Allegiance: Indonesia
- Branch/service: Indonesian Army
- Years of service: 1970–2002
- Rank: General
- Commands: Deputy Commander of the Indonesian National Armed Forces

Fachrul Razi (born 26 July 1947) is an Indonesian politician and retired army officer who serves as Indonesian Minister of Religious Affairs since 23 October 2019. He is only the third person of military background to occupy the office, after Navy retiree Tarmizi Taher (1993–1998) and Army general Alamsyah Ratu Perwiranegara (1978–1983). As Tarmizi was a 2-star admiral and Alamsyah was a 3-star general, Fachrul – a 4-star general – is the highest-ranked military officer to have ever held this ministerial office.

Fachrul is the last Deputy Commander of the Indonesian National Armed Forces (1999–2000) and is one of the founders of political party Hanura.

== Life ==
Fachrul Razi was born in Banda Aceh (then named Kutaradja) on 26 July 1947. He is of Minangkabau descent from Maninjau, West Sumatra. Razi graduated from the Indonesian Military Academy as part of its 1970 cohort.

=== Army ===
Throughout his career in the Indonesian Army, Razi specialized in infantry, and was commander of the 1st Infantry Brigade of Kodam Jaya as a colonel. He was promoted to starred rank around 1995–1996. He commanded Indonesia's Garuda Contingent between August 1989 and September 1990 as part of the United Nations Iran–Iraq Military Observer Group, while ranked lieutenant colonel.

He became the governor of the military academy (1996–1997) and the operational assistant to the armed forces chief of staff (1997–1998), before eventually becoming chief of staff himself between 1998 and 1999. In 1999, he was made deputy commander under Admiral Widodo Adi Sutjipto. However, President Abdurrahman Wahid requested the abolishing of Razi's position, and in 2000 Razi was removed from his post. He retired from the military in 2002.

In a 2004 interview, Razi defended Wiranto's (then TNI commander) actions during the 1998 Jakarta riots, during which Razi was chief of staff. Razi was part of a military council in 1998 which fired Prabowo Subianto from his position, and when a letter claimed to be the official letter of Prabowo's removal circulated in 2014, Razi confirmed its validity.

=== Post-service ===
After retiring from active service, Razi went into hiatus for three years before being appointed as president commissioner at Toba Sejahtera Group, which belongs to Luhut Binsar Pandjaitan. He also served as president commissioner at aquaculture company Central Proteina Prima and at the state-owned company PT Antam.

Razi became one of the founders of the People's Conscience Party (Hanura) in 2006 and in the 2009 Indonesian presidential election, Razi endorsed the Jusuf Kalla-Wiranto ticket. He then endorsed Joko Widodo's successful run in the 2014 Indonesian presidential election, and became an adviser for defense during the construction of the new cabinet.

In the 2019 Indonesian presidential election, Razi led the "Bravo 5" team, composing of retired armed forces officers supporting Joko Widodo's ultimately successful reelection campaign.

On 21 September 2020, Razi tested positive for COVID-19.

== Minister of Religious Affairs ==
Razi was appointed Minister of Religious Affairs in the Onward Indonesia Cabinet on 23 October 2019 by the President of Indonesia, replacing Lukman Hakim Saifuddin. Soon after his appointment, Razi floated a possible regulation banning the use of face veils and "cingkrang" trousers - articles often worn by Muslims - from being worn in government premises.

In September 2020, he was criticized by parliament's commission on religious affairs after he said radicalism was being spread by "good-looking" people who were good Quran reciters and Arabic speakers. In December 2020, he was among six ministers replaced in a cabinet reshuffle.
