= 2018 in Indonesia =

- Centuries: 19th; 20th; 21st
- Decades: 1990s; 2000s; 2010s; 2020s
- See also: History of Indonesia; Timeline of Indonesian history; List of years in Indonesia

2018 (MMXVIII) was a common year starting on Monday of the Gregorian calendar, the 2018th year of the Common Era (CE) and Anno Domini (AD) designations, the 18th year of the 3rd millennium and the 21st century, and the 9th year of the 2010s decade.

During that year, Indonesia held multiple international sporting events, including the 2018 Asian Games and the 2018 Asian Para Games. The Indonesian government designated 16 national holidays and 5 religious holidays in 2018.

Indonesia also suffered major incidents and major natural disasters throughout the year. A string of terrorist attacks occurred throughout Indonesia on May, with the most serious incident occurred in Surabaya from 13 to 14 May. In terms of natural disasters, the Indonesian National Board for Disaster Management (BNPB) recorded a total of 1,999 natural disasters throughout the year, with more than 4,000 deaths. Month of September saw the largest loss of life due to the 2018 Sulawesi earthquake and tsunami, the deadliest earthquake in Indonesia in more than a decade.

Multiple major transportation disasters also occurred on that year. The second deadliest aircraft disaster in Indonesia occurred in October when Lion Air Flight 610 crashed shortly after taking off from Tangerang. One of the deadliest ferry disaster in North Sumatra occurred on June when MV Sinar Bangun sank at Lake Toba. There were also at least two bus disasters that caused more than 20 deaths in 2018.

== Incumbents ==
=== President and Vice President ===
| President | Vice President |
|---|---|
| Joko Widodo | Jusuf Kalla |

=== Ministers and Coordinating Ministers ===
==== Coordinating Ministers ====
| Photo | Position | Name |
|---|---|---|
| | Coordinating Minister of Political, Legal, and Security Affairs | Wiranto |
| | Coordinating Minister of Economic Affairs | Darmin Nasution |
| | Coordinating Minister of Maritime Affairs and Investment | Luhut Binsar Pandjaitan |
| | Coordinating Minister of Human Development and Culture | Puan Maharani |

==== Ministers ====
| Photo | Position | Name |
|---|---|---|
| | Minister of State Secretariat | Pratikno |
| | Minister of Home Affairs | Tjahjo Kumolo |
| | Minister of Foreign Affairs | Retno Marsudi |
| | Minister of Defence | Ryamizard Ryacudu |
| | Minister of Law and Human Rights | Yasonna Laoly |
| | Minister of Finance | Sri Mulyani |
| | Minister of Energy and Mineral Resources | Ignasius Jonan |
| | Minister of Industry | Airlangga Hartarto |
| | Minister of Trade | Enggartiasto Lukita |
| | Minister of Agriculture | Amran Sulaiman |
| | Minister of Environment and Forestry | Siti Nurbaya Bakar |
| | Minister of Transportation | Budi Karya Sumadi |
| | Minister of Marine Affairs and Fisheries | Susi Pudjiastuti |
| | Minister of Manpower | Hanif Dhakiri |
| | Minister of Public Works and Public Housing | Basuki Hadimuljono |
| | Minister of Health | Nila Moeloek |
| | Minister of Education and Culture | Muhadjir Effendy |
| | Minister of Agrarian Affairs and Spatial Planning | Sofyan Djalil |
| | Minister of Social Affairs | Agus Gumiwang Kartasasmita |
| | Minister of Religious Affairs | Lukman Hakim Saifuddin |
| | Minister of Communication and Information Technology | Rudiantara |
| | Minister of Research and Technology | Mohamad Nasir |
| | Minister of Cooperatives and Small & Medium Enterprises | Anak Agung Gede Ngurah Puspayoga |
| | Minister of Women's Empowerment and Child Protection | Yohana Yembise |
| | Minister of Administrative and Bureaucratic Reform | Syafruddin |
| | Minister of Villages, Development of Disadvantaged Regions and Transmigration | Eko Putro Sandjojo |
| | Minister of National Development Planning | Bambang Brodjonegoro |
| | Minister of State-Owned Enterprises | Rini Soemarno |
| | Minister of Tourism and Creative Economy | Arief Yahya |
| | Minister of Youth and Sports | Imam Nahrawi |

==== Resigned ministers ====
| Photo | Position | Name |
|---|---|---|
| | Minister of Social Affairs (1st) | Khofifah Indar Parawansa |
| | Minister of Social Affairs (2nd) | Idrus Marham |
| | Minister of Administrative and Bureaucratic Reform | Asman Abnur |

== Events ==
=== January ===
- January 1
  - A speedboat carrying at least 39 people capsized near the shoreline in Tarakan, North Kalimantan. It reportedly struck a tree prior to its sinking. At least 31 people were rescued and 8 others were killed in the accident.
  - At least 31 people suffered food poisoning due to consumption of contaminated tapai in Purwakarta, West Java.
- January 11 – More than 30 elementary schools students in Bandung suffered food poisoning after consuming contaminated street foods.
- January 12 – Regent of Talaud Islands Regency Sri Wahyu was deactivated from duty for at least three months due to unauthorized trips to the United States.
- January 15 – A mezzanine floor collapses at the Indonesia Stock Exchange building, injuring 77 people.
- January 16
  - Jakarta's Maritime Museum in North Jakarta caught fire, workers and visitors in the museum were evacuated. No casualties.
  - A measles outbreak was declared in Asmat, Papua. Further investigation revealed that multiple families had suffered from malnutrition.
  - Government officials were targeted with harsh criticism after the revelation of mass malnutrition among Asmat tribe, prompting public outcry and protests.
- January 17
  - Indonesian President Jokowi reshuffles cabinet.
  - Minister of Social Affairs Khofifah Indar Parawansa sent her resignation letter after she stated that she would enter the race for the 2018 Indonesian local elections as the governor of East Java.
- January 23
  - A magnitude 6.0 earthquake struck the southern coast of Java. The epicenter of the quake was near Lebak, Banten at depth of about 60 km. Two people died of heart attacks and 32 were injured. Hundreds of buildings including dozens in the capital Jakarta were damaged.
  - The Argo Parahyangan executive train traveling from Jakarta jumped the railway track as it entered Bandung station. No fatalities or injured in incident.
- January 29 – At least 25 houses were damaged after freak tides struck Sukabumi, West Java.

=== February ===
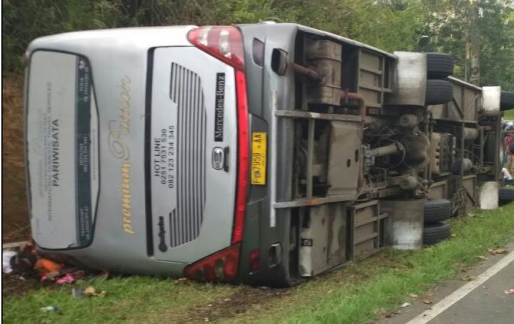
Scene of the Subang bus disaster, regarded as one of the worst and deadliest bus disaster in Indonesian history

- February 2 – Former actor and Governor of Jambi Zumi Zola was arrested by the Corruption Eradication Commission (KPK) due to suspected gratification of several projects in Jambi worth of Rp 6 billion rupiah.
- February 4
  - Regent of Jombang, Nyono, was arrested by KPK due to suspicion of corruption.
  - At least 4 construction workers were killed after a crane collapse in Jatinegara, Jakarta.
- February 6
  - Regional Disaster Mitigation Agency of Yogyakarta reported that at least 11 sinkholes were detected in Gunungkidul.
  - Governor of West Java, Ahmad Heryawan, declared a state of emergency for the province due to threats of landslides and floods.
- February 9 – At least 16 houses were damaged after a tornado struck a village in Mojokerto.
- February 10
  - At least 27 people have died after a bus plunged from a hill on West Java. 18 other people were injured.
  - National Narcotics Board (BNN) seized a Singaporean vessel in Philips Strait after the vessel allegedly carried 1.1 tonnes of methamphetamine.
- February 15 – KPK announced that 19 government officials, including members of Central Lampung Regional House of Representatives and the Regent of Central Lampung Regency, Mustafa, were arrested for allegations of bribery of a project worth Rp 300 million rupiah in Lampung.
- February 17 – General Elections Commission (KPU) declared that 4 newly formed political parties have qualified for the 2019 Indonesia General Elections.
- February 18 – KPU officially draws the number of each political parties for the 2019 election.
- February 19 – Mount Sinabung erupted, spewing ash 5 km into the sky. At least 4 districts were affected due to the eruption.
- February 22 – At least nine people have been killed and 13 are still missing after a landslide cascaded down the terraced slopes of a rice field on Brebes, Central Java.
- February 23 – Indonesian Police arrested 28 crew members of a Taiwanese vessel which reportedly carried methamphetamine.
- February 24
  - Commissioner of the General Elections Commission of Garut was arrested by KPK due to allegations of bribery.
  - An 80 meter long cracks caused panic among residents in Banjarnegara, sparking evacuation.
- February 28 – A Rp3.5 trillion rupiah yacht, named Equinimity, was seized by the Indonesian National Police and FBI after international investigation concluded that the owners were involved in 1MDB case.

=== March ===
- March 1 – Mayor of Kendari, Adriatma Dwi Putra, was arrested by the Corruption Eradication Commission for alleged bribery.
- March 7 – At least 62 people were treated for food poisoning after allegedly consuming contaminated food from a wedding.
- March 8 – A boat carrying 11 santri capsized after being struck by multiple high waves near Sapeken Island. At least 2 people were killed.
- March 9 – Acting Speaker of the Indonesian House of Representatives Fadli Zon reported Secretary General of Indonesian Solidarity Party (PSI) and activist Faisal Assegaf to the police for disinformation.
- March 10 – At least 2 people were killed after an accident involving an M113 APC in Purworejo.
- March 12 – In line with international regulations, the Indonesian Ministry of Transportation issued an announcement to ban passengers from bringing battery charger into the cabin of an aircraft.
- March 13 – Indonesian Supreme Court put a judge from Tangerang High Court on administrative leave due to alleged bribery.
- March 16 – Corruption Eradication Commission (KPK) announced that a candidate for governor of North Maluku Ahmad Mus was declared as a suspect in an airport corruption case.
- March 18 – Indonesian Ministry of Agriculture assured that a viral video claiming "fake eggs" in Indonesia was a hoax.
- March 19 – Fierce backlash after Prabowo Subianto made a speech of Indonesia breaking apart in 2030.
- March 20 – A propeller aircraft crashed while performing an aerobatic show in Cilacap. The sole occupant of the aircraft, the pilot, was killed in the accident.
- March 24 – At least 600 hectares of crops were damaged or destroyed due to toxic fumes from Ijen crater.
- March 29 – Former Speaker of the Indonesian House of Representatives Setya Novanto was charged with 16 years in prison due to the corruption of at least US$7.3 million in the E-KTP case.
- March 30 – More than 1,200 people were displaced after a massive inferno tore through densely populated residential area in West Jakarta.
- March 31 – At least 2 people were killed after two landing craft tank vessels collided off the coast of Balikpapan, East Kalimantan.

=== April ===
- April 2 – Daughter of former Indonesian president, President Sukarno, Sukmawati Sukarnoputri, was reported to the police for her Ibu Indonesia poem.
- April 4 – The Indonesian Agency for the Assessment and Application of Technology (BPPT) issued a warning of a possible 57 meters tsunami in Pandeglang in the future.
- April 7 – At least 1 person was killed after a train collided with a truck in Ngawi, East Java.
- April 11 – Prabowo Subianto announced his bid as a presidential candidate for the 2019 Indonesian general elections.
- April 12 – A total of 42 people died due to the consumption of bootleg liquor in West Java.
- April 16 – A wall collapsed onto students who were practicing gamelan in Cirebon. At least 7 students were crushed to their deaths.
- April 19 – A magnitude 4.4 earthquake struck Banjarnegara Regency in Central Java. At least 3 people were killed and more than 300 structures were damaged. At least 27 people were injured by the quake.
- April 20 – Seven Banyuwangi residents died after drinking bootleg liquor.
- April 24
  - Former Speaker of the Indonesian House of Representatives Setya Novanto was sentenced to 15 years in prison after judges found Novanto guilty in e-KTP corruption case.
  - At least 47 houses and 2 campus buildings were damaged after a tornado struck Yogyakarta.
- 25 April – At least 28 people were killed and 30 people were injured after an oil well explosion in East Aceh.

=== May ===
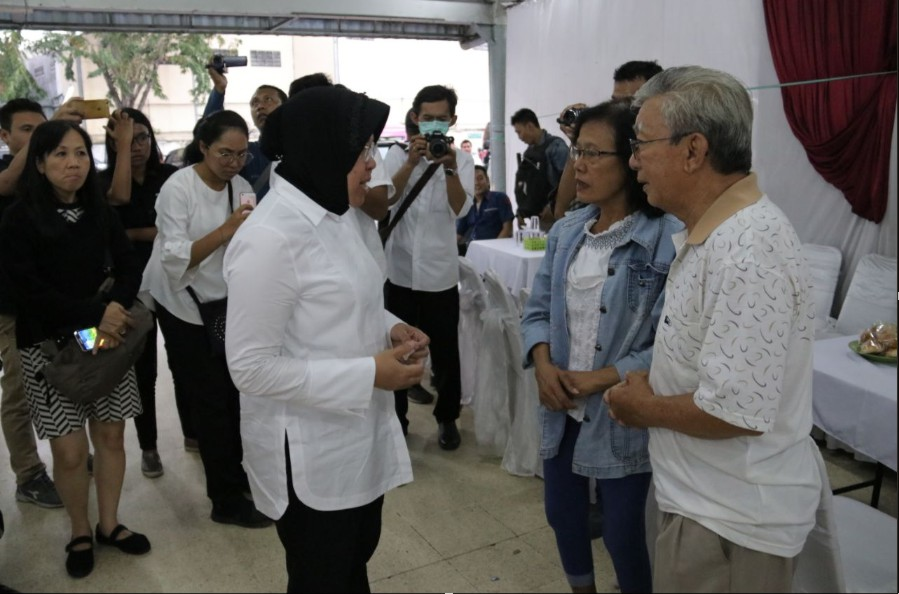
Mayor of Surabaya Tri Rismaharini visited relatives of the victims of the church bombings

- May 9 – 2018 Mako Brimob standoff – At least 5 police officers were killed after a standoff in Mako Brimob. There were reports of multiple shootings inside the complex. The incident was regarded as a terrorist attack and the deadliest terrorist attack on police officers in Indonesia.
- May 11 – A phreatic eruption occurred on Mount Merapi. The eruption spewed ash as high as 5 km into the sky.
- May 13–14 – Surabaya bombings
  - Three churches across Surabaya were attacked by suicide bombers. A total of 15 people were killed in the blasts and dozens more were wounded in the attack. The perpetrators were identified as a family from Surabaya.
  - On the evening, a bomb exploded inside an apartment complex near Surabaya, killing 3 people and wounded 3 others. The victims were terrorists and the blast was deemed as accidental. They planned to detonate the bomb the next day in churches.
  - On the morning of May 14, the Surabaya Police Headquarters was attacked by a family of suicide bombers. They detonated the bombs while they were being stopped by policemen. 10 people were wounded in the attack.
- May 15 – In response to the terrorist attacks in Mako Brimob and in Surabaya, Indonesian police conducted multiple crackdowns on suspected terrorists throughout Indonesia
- May 16 – At least 5 people, including 4 terrorists, were killed in an attack on a police station in Riau, Another 4 people, including journalists, were injured in the attack.
- May 18 – Indonesian extremist Aman Abdurrahman was sentenced to death for creating the extremist group Jamaah Ansharut Daulat (JAD), which was responsible for multiple terrorist attacks in the past two years.
- May 20 – At least 12 people were killed after a truck ploughed into crowd of people in Brebes, Central Java.
- May 21 – Hundreds evacuated after another phreatic eruption on Mount Merapi.
- May 24 – Kertajati International Airport, the largest international airport in West Java, was officially opened by Joko Widodo.
- May 25 – In response to the multiple terrorist attacks across Indonesia in the past few days, the Indonesian House of Representatives passed a new stronger and tighter anti-terrorism law. The law will grant law enforcers and the Indonesian military more power to conduct anti-terrorism operation.
- May 30 – At least 8 people were killed after a fire tore through a boarding house in Surabaya.

=== June ===
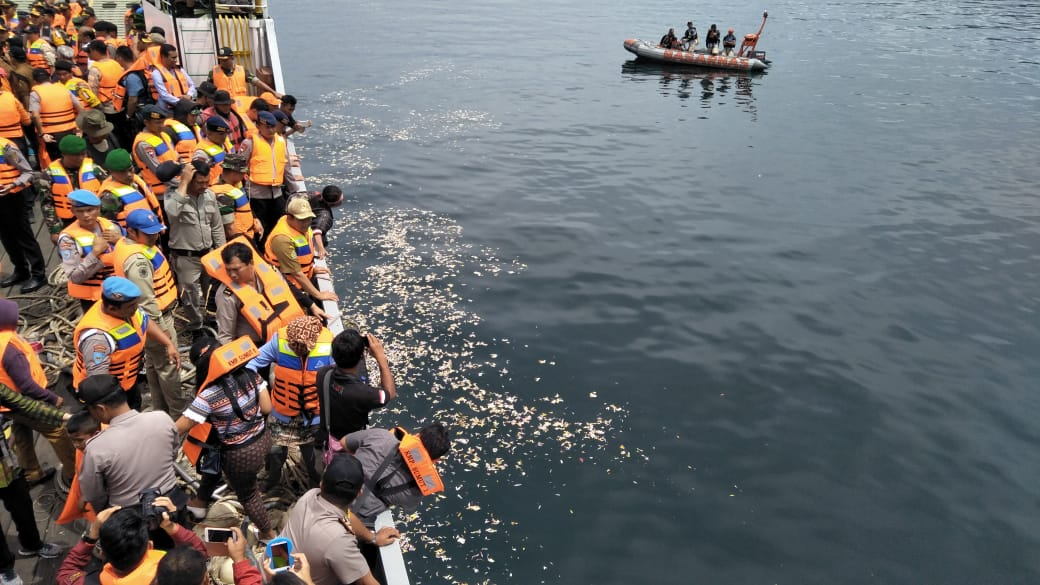
People threw flowers near the site of the sinking of MV Sinar Bangun, in which more than 180 people were listed as missing and presumed dead

- June 1 – Minister of Law, Justice and Human Rights Yasonna Laoly held a discussion with Minister of Foreign Affairs Retno Marsudi after reports indicated that the government of Israel will ban Indonesians from entering the country.
- June 5 – Regent of Purbalingga, Tasdi, was arrested for a corruption case on an Islamic Center project.
- June 8 – A motorist was killed on Jakarta – Cikampek toll road after a large rock was thrown from a pedestrian bridge located above the toll onto cars underneath the bridge. At least one person was arrested due to the incident.
- June 9 – Indonesia was chosen as one of the non-permanent members of the United Nations Security Council, the fourth time in Indonesian history.
- June 13 – At least 13 people were killed after a boat capsized off the coast of Makassar. Authorities suspected that overcapacity caused the vessel to capsize.
- June 15 – Indonesian police announced that at least 110 suspected terrorists had been arrested.
- June 18 – An overloaded ferry carrying 188 people and 50 vehicles capsized in Lake Toba, North Sumatra. 21 people survived the disaster while 3 people were confirmed dead. More than 160 people were missing and presumed dead. It remains as one of the deadliest ferry disaster in Indonesian history.
- June 22 – Mastermind of the 2016 Jakarta attacks, Aman Abdurrahman, was sentenced to death.
- June 25
  - Ministry of Education and Culture announced that, on the next school year, schools will start applying zonasi (zone) system for the national student enrollment program.
  - Indonesian National Police stated that a plane carrying logistics for local elections was shot by militiamen in Papua, injuring a pilot.
- June 27 – Indonesia held the 2018 Indonesian local elections. Voters elected 17 governors, 39 mayors and 115 regents across the country.
- June 29
  - President Joko Widodo welcomed Malaysian Prime Minister Mahathir Mohamad at the Bogor Palace. The two leaders exploring issues ranging from education for Indonesian children in Malaysia to border negotiations.
  - Indonesian Constitutional Court rejected plans to legalize online ojek.
- June 30 – At least 5 Indonesians were killed after two speedboats collided near Nunukan, North Kalimantan.

=== July ===
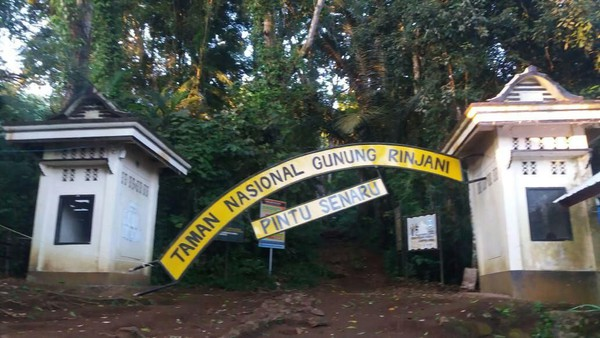
Gate of Rinjani National Park was damaged after a strong earthquake struck the island of Lombok

- July 3
  - Democratic Party of Indonesia stated that the party is considering to form a new third coalition for the 2019 Indonesian general elections.
  - MV Lestari Maju crashed onto reefs off the shore of thu Selayar Islands, killing 35 people.
- July 5 – A low-explosive bomb exploded inside a house in Pasuruan, East Java. No one was killed in the failed terror attack, but a 6 year old kid had to be brought to the hospital due to explosion injury.
- July 8 – At least 3 people were killed after a fire tore through the office of the Indonesian Ministry of Transportation. A total of 20 survivors were reported.
- July 15
  - A failed terrorist attack occurred at a police station in Indramayu, West Java. A couple threw a pressure-cooker bomb into a guarding post in the station. The bomb failed to explode. No one was harmed in the incident.
  - At least 292 crocodiles were killed by 400 people of Sorong, West Papua after a crocodile preyed upon a local resident.
- July 19 – At least 7 sailors were killed after high waves capsized their boat off the coast of Jember, East Java.
- July 21 – KPK arrested the Head of Sukamiskin Penitentiary due to alleged extortion.
- July 29 – A magnitude 6.4 earthquake struck the Indonesian island of Lombok, killing 20 people and injuring dozens. Hundreds of hikers were trapped in Mount Rinjani after multiple landslides and rockfalls occurred after the quake.

=== August ===
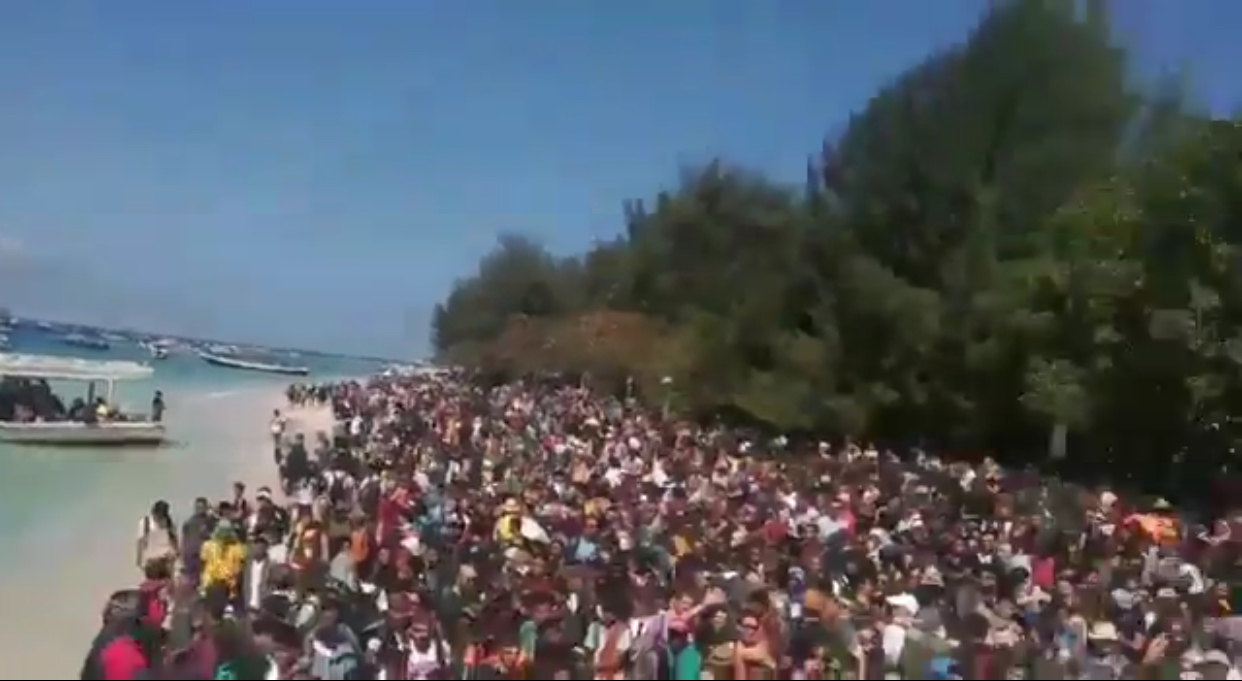
Tourists were evacuated from the Gili Islands after a powerful earthquake struck Lombok, which killed more than 500 people

- August 1
  - The Regional Board for Disaster Mitigation recorded a total damage of Rp7.2 billion across 24 beaches in 3 regencies after multiple high waves destroyed stall, structures and boats.
  - Palembang LRT began operations in preparation for the 2018 Asian Games, making it the first light rail transit system to operate in Indonesia.
- August 5 – A major 6.9 earthquake struck the island of Lombok. Widespread destruction were reported across multiple regencies in Lombok and Bali. At least 560 deaths and a total damage of 8.8 trillion rupiah were reported, making it one of strongest, deadliest, and most destructive earthquake to have ever hit Lombok.
- August 6 – Pro-Jokowi coalition announced that they have appointed 225 spokesperson for Joko Widodo's presidential campaign.
- August 8 – Vice Secretary General of the Democratic Party Andi Arief accused the Great Indonesia Movement Party (Gerindra) of asking Sandiaga Uno to pay Rp500 billion rupiah so that he could be a vice presidential candidate for Prabowo Subianto. Arief accused Prabowo Subianto as "General Cardboard" (Indonesian: Jenderal Kardus), thereby destroying any hopes for a coalition between the two major party.
- August 9
  - President Joko Widodo chose Ma'ruf Amin as his vice presidential candidate for the 2019 general elections.
  - Later at night, at a different location, Prabowo Subianto chose Sandiaga Uno as his vice presidential candidate for the 2019 general elections.
  - At least 6 people were killed after a strong aftershock struck Lombok, West Nusa Tenggara.
- August 10 – Sandiaga Uno announced that he has sent his resignation letter as Vice Governor of Jakarta to Anies Baswedan.
- August 11 – A Dimonim Air Pilatus PC-6 Porter carrying 9 passengers and crew members crashed into a forested terrain in Papua, killing all but one.
- August 14
  - At least 11 members of a fictional kingdom called the "Kingdom of the Jellyfishes" were arrested by the Indonesian police.
  - Minister of Administrative and Bureaucratic Reform Asman Abnur announced that he has stepped down from his position.
- August 18 – President Joko Widodo and Vice President Jusuf Kalla officially opened the 2018 Asian Games in Jakarta.
- August 19 – At least 14 people were killed and 24 people were wounded after a strong magnitude 6.9 earthquake struck the island of Lombok.
- August 23 – Meiliana, a resident from Tanjungbalai, was sentenced to 18 months in prison after complaining about the loud volume of a call for prayers from nearby mosque. The sentencing caused concern among the public.
- August 24
  - Minister of Social Affairs Idrus Marham resigned from his position after allegations of corruption.
  - Agus Gumiwang Kartasasmita was immediately appointed as the new Minister of Social Affairs after Marham's resignation.

=== September ===
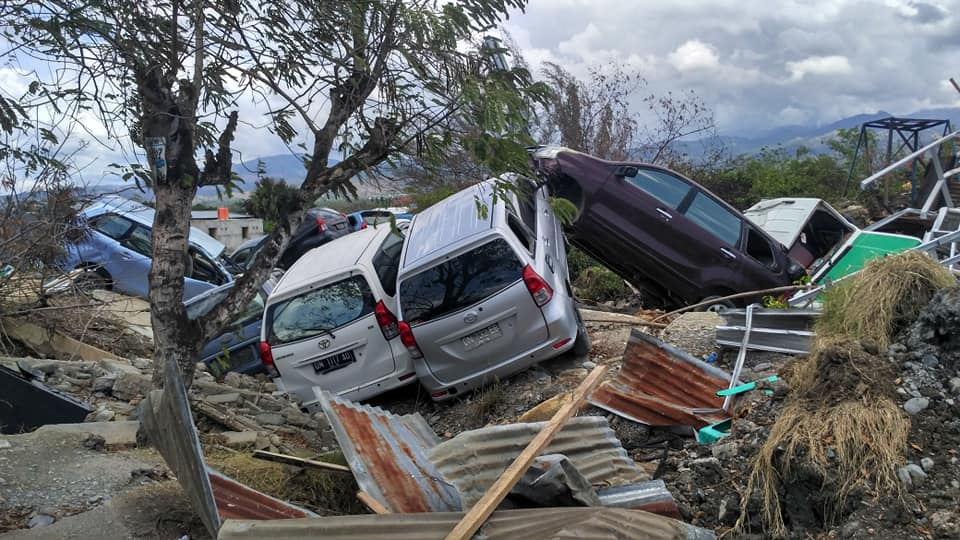
Nearly 5.000 people were killed after a powerful earthquake, tsunami and liquefaction caused havoc in Central Sulawesi

- September 2 – Indonesia reached the 4th spot among every nations that participated in 2018 Asian Games, with a total of 31 gold medals, 24 silver medals and 43 bronze medals.
- September 3
  - KPK arrested 22 members of Malang House of Representatives after allegations of bribery and gratification.
  - At least 600 kiosks were destroyed after a massive fire tore through Bandung's infamous Gedebage market.
- September 4 – A microlight plane carrying Indonesian singer Erix Soekamti crashed in Gunungkidul, Yogyakarta. Both Erix and the pilot survived the crash.
- September 5 – Erick Thohir was chosen as the Chief Campaign Manager of presidential candidate Joko Widodo.
- September 8 – At least 21 people were killed after a bus carrying 38 people fell into a ravine in Sukabumi, West Java.
- September 18 – Presidential candidate Prabowo Subianto and Sandiaga Uno chose "Koalisi Indonesia Adil Makmur" as the candidates' alliance name.
- September 20 – Former Indonesian Army General Djoko Santoso was chosen as the Chief Campaign Manager of presidential candidate Prabowo Subianto.
- September 28 – 2018 Sulawesi earthquake and tsunami – A powerful magnitude 7.4 supershear earthquake struck the Indonesian province of Central Sulawesi, producing tsunami waves reaching as high as 13 meters and causing widespread destruction in cities and regencies in Central Sulawesi. Landslides, rockfalls, tsunamis, and major soil liquefactions, which caused hundreds of deaths in the provincial capital Palu, were reported across the province. More than 4,000 people were killed in the disaster in what was described as Central Sulawesi's deadliest disaster in Indonesian history.

=== October ===
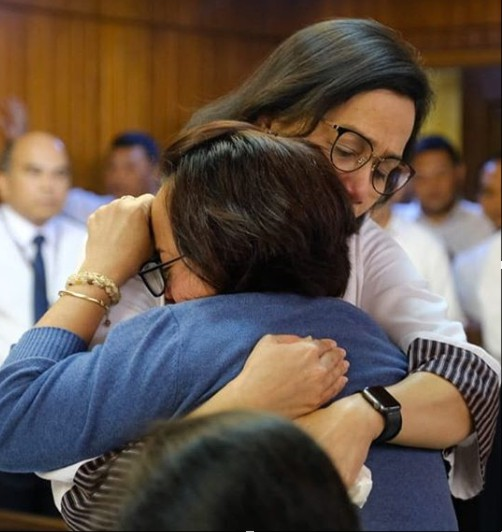
Minister of Finance Sri Mulyani comforted relatives of the victims of Lion Air Flight 610 after news report indicated that the flight has crashed off the coast of Karawang

- October 1
  - Minister of Home Affairs Tjahjo Kumolo ordered to halt all forms of political campaign in Central Sulawesi after a massive earthquake had struck the region.
  - Prabowo Subianto stated that he will send volunteers to Central Sulawesi to assist with the relief efforts.
- October 2 – Prominent human rights activist and member of Prabowo Subianto's presidential campaign team Ratna Sarumpaet claimed to have been assaulted by three unidentified men in Bandung.
- October 3 – Ratna Sarumpaet admitted that she had lied about the assault claim, later stating that she is "the best hoax creator", causing widespread condemnation.
- October 5
  - Indonesian police arrested Ratna Sarumpaet for disinformation.
  - KPK arrested Mayor of Pasuruan Setiyono due to an alleged corruption case.
- October 11 – At least 4 people were killed and 26 people were injured after a strong 6.0 magnitude earthquake struck Situbondo Regency, East Java.
- October 13 – At least 22 people died and many are missing after heavy floods and landslides in Sumatra, Indonesia.
- October 15 – Regent of Bekasi, Neneng Hassanah Yasin, was arrested for an alleged bribery of the Meikarta megaproject.
- October 16 – Director of Lippo Group, which was the owner of Meikarta megaproject, was arrested.
- October 22 – At least 3 people were arrested in Garut after a video showed the burning of a tawhid flag.
- October 23 – Former Coordinating Minister for Maritime Affairs Rizal Ramli reported a possible massive corruption case of rice imports and other food imports.
- October 24 – Regent of Cirebon, Sunjaya Purwadi Sastra, was arrested for an alleged corruption case worth billions of rupiah.
- October 27
  - A twister swept through the city of Palembang, damaging multiple structures including a venue in Jakabaring Sport City and a LRT station.
  - Three members of Central Kalimantan Regional House of Representatives were arrested by KPK for bribery.
- October 29 – Lion Air Flight 610 dived into the Java Sea shortly after taking off from Soekarno-Hatta International Airport, killing all 189 passengers and crews on board in the second deadliest aviation disaster in Indonesian history.
- October 30 – KPK arrested a high-profile member of National Mandate Party, Taufik Kurniawan, and the Regent of Kebumen Regency, Muhamad Yahya Fuad, for alleged bribery of Rp3.65 billion rupiah.

=== November ===
- November 6 – Presidential hopeful Prabowo Subianto apologized to the public after his controversial "Boyolali face" remarks, which was regarded as an insult to people from Boyolali.
- November 9 – At least 3 people were killed after an incident during the performance of "Surabaya Membara".
- November 15 – KPK stated that a discrepancy between two data on coal sector potentially have caused the government to lose a total of Rp1.3 trillion rupiah.
- November 12 – Vice presidential hopeful Sandiaga Uno was criticized for stepping on one of the graves of the founders of Nahdlatul Ulama.
- November 17 – A total of 43 santri were rushed to the hospital due to mass food poisoning in Garut.
- November 18
  - KPK arrested Remigo Yolanda Berutu, Regent of West Pakpak, for alleged bribery.
  - At least 32 houses were destroyed after a tornado struck Probolinggo, East Java.
- November 19 – A tornado swept through two villages in Mojokerto, damaging at least 137 houses.
- November 20 – At least 447 houses were damaged or destroyed after a tornado tore through a village in Sidoarjo, East Java.
- November 21
  - Baiq Nuril, a victim of a sexual harassment, was sentenced to 6 months in prison for "spreading the evidence of a sexual harassment" to authorities.
  - Calls from the public to pass the anti-sexual violence law after the imprisonment of Baiq Nuril.
- November 22 – Prominent member of the Islamic Defenders Front (FPI), Gus Nur, was arrested for defamation.
- November 24 – Dozens of houses were damaged after strong winds swept through 3 villages in Jombang, East Java.

=== December ===
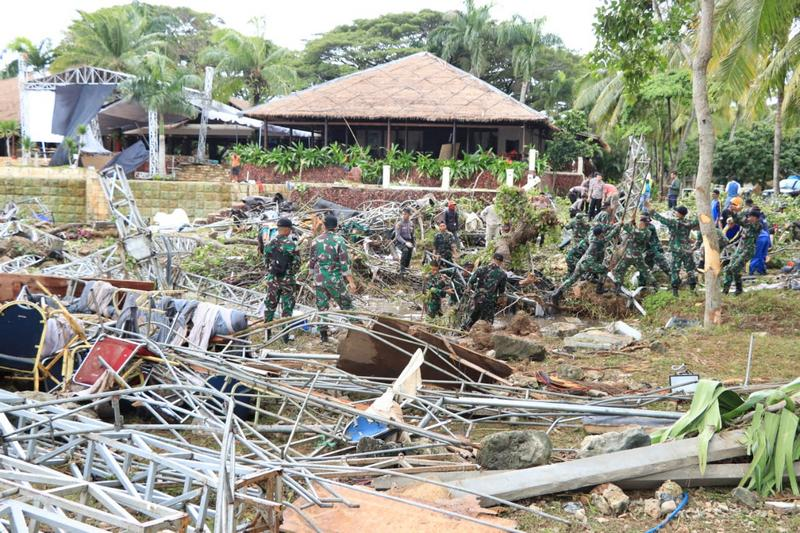
Devastation seen here in Banten after a landslide tsunami caused more than 400 deaths across Banten and Lampung

- December 1 – A total of 40 construction workers were killed after being ambushed by Papuan insurgents in Nduga Regency, Papua.
- December 2 – Hundreds of thousands of people attended the "Reuni 212" (212 Reunion) in Jakarta, an event which commemorated the movement that led to the imprisonment of Jakarta's governor Basuki Tjahaja Purnama.
- December 3 – Habib Bahar was summoned by the Indonesian police for "spreading hate" on President Joko Widodo.
- December 6 – At least 3 people were killed after being shot by a rogue soldier in Prabumulih, Lampung.
- December 7
  - At least 9 houses were damaged and 120 others were submerged after a 5.3 magnitude earthquake and a flood struck Dompu, West Nusa Tenggara.
  - President Joko Widodo declared December 7 as National Wayang Day.
- December 14 – The Indonesian Constitutional Court revised the minimum age for marriage.
- December 18
  - Rows of buildings were destroyed after a section of a major road in Surabaya collapsed onto a river.
  - Controversy after presidential candidate Prabowo Subianto claimed that Indonesia "will go extinct".
- December 22 – More than 420 people were killed after a tsunami struck the Indonesian province of Banten and Lampung. The tsunami was caused by the collapse of the Anak Krakatoa volcano following eruptions that had happened for days prior to the disaster.
- December 24 – Province of Bali becomes the first province in Indonesia to ban single-use plastics.
- December 30 – At least 165 houses were damaged after a tornado swept through a residential area in Cirebon.
- December 31 – At least 18 people were killed following a landslide in Sukabumi Regency, West Java.

== Deaths ==
=== January ===
- January 5 – Yon Koeswoyo – Musician (b.1940).
- January 13 – Darmanto Jatman – poet (b.1942).
- January 15 – Sujud Sutrisno – Street Musician (b.1953).
- January 23 – Sys NS – Actor (b.1956).

=== February ===
- February 5 – Jockie Soerjoprajogo – Indonesian musician & songwriter (b.1954).
- February 9 – Gareng Rakasiwi – comedian (b.1967).
- February 10 – Advent Bangun – Indonesian actor (b.1952).

=== March ===
- March 10 – Hari Darmawan – entrepreneur (b.1940).
- March 26 – Probosutedjo – entrepreneur (b.1930).

=== April ===
- April 3 – Slamet Suryanto – former mayor of Surakarta. (b.1944).
- April 8 – Nia Kurniasi Adiekoesoema – First Indonesian Representatives of Miss Universe. (b.1958).
- April 10 – Andika Putrahasadewa – former bassist of Kerispatih (b.1982).
- April 17 – Amoroso Katamsi – actor (b.1940).
- April 18 – Deddy Sutomo – actor (b.1939).

=== May ===
- May 14 – Enthus Susmono – Wayang player and former regent of Tegal (b.1966).
- May 15 – Gogon – comedian (b.1959).
- May 31 – Dawam Rahardjo – Scholar and human rights activist (b.1942).

=== June ===
- June 13 – Yusran Effendi – comedian (b.1959).
- June 14 – Nurbuat – comedian (b.1949).
- June 24 – Harry Moekti – singer (b.1957).
- June 30 – Gerardus Mayela Sudarta – artist and cartoonist (b.1945).

=== July ===
- July 3 – Arief Rivan – actor (b.1951).
- July 6 – Saafroedin Bahar – politician, members of the Indonesian National Armed Forces. (b.1937).
- July 26 – A. Waris Husain – former mayor of Samarinda (b.1944)
- July 27 – Tino Saroengallo – actor, film producer, and writer. (b.1958).
- July 28 – Marlis Rahman – politician (b.1942).

=== August ===
- August 3 – Yusuf Supendi – politician. (b.1958).
- August 26 – Hamsad Rangkuti – writer (b.1943).
- August 30 – Sirajuddin Zar – academician (b.1953).

=== October ===
- October 2 – Burhan Uray – entrepreneur and philanthropist (b.1931).
- October 5 – Rudy Wowor – actor (b.1941).
- October 22 – Titi Qadarsih – actress (b.1945).

=== November ===
- November 1 – George Taka – actor (b.1967)
- November 4 – Pretty Asmara – actress (b.1977)

=== December ===
- December 4 – Nh. Dini – Indonesian novelist (b. 1936).
- December 22
  - Herman Sikumbang – Indonesian guitarist (b. 1982).
  - Aa Jimmy – actor and comedian (b.1983).
  - Dylan Sahara – actress and model (b.1992).
- December 25 – Ali Shahab – film director, screenwriter, journalist, and novelist (b.1941).
- December 27 – Dian Pramana Poetra – singer (b.1961).
