= Andhika Chrisnayudhanto =

Indonesian diplomat (born 1972)

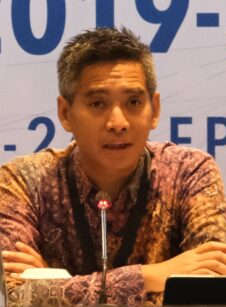

Ambassador of Indonesia to Brazil
- Incumbent
- Assumed office 25 August 2025
- President: Prabowo Subianto
- Preceded by: Edi Yusup

Deputy for International Cooperation in the National Counter Terrorism Agency
- Incumbent
- Assumed office 19 July 2019
- Preceded by: Hamidin

Personal details
- Born: May 26, 1972 (age 53)
- Spouse: Tri Dewi Widyastuti
- Education: National University; Monash University

Andhika Chrisnayudhanto (born 26 May 1972) is an Indonesian diplomat who is the ambassador to Brazil since 2025. He previously worked within the National Counter Terrorism Agency as director for regional and multilateral cooperation and deputy for international cooperation.

== Education ==
Andhika was born on 26 May 1972. He received his bachelor's degree from the National University in political sciences in 1996 and in private law in 1999. He then continued his studies to Australia, where he received his master's degree in foreign affairs and trade from the Monash University in 2000.

== Career ==
Andhika joined the foreign ministry in March 1997. During his tour of duty in the foreign ministry, Andhika served in the Permanent Mission of the Republic of Indonesia to the United Nations in Vienna as third secretary and was later promoted to second secretary. He assumed a number of positions in the foreign ministry, including as head of the subdirectorate for transnational organized crime and for political and security treaties. He was nominated as the director political, security, and regional treaties in the ministry in 2016, but was unsuccessful.

In April 2017, Andhika was transferred to the National Counter Terrorism Agency as the director for regional and multilateral cooperation, with responsibilities on strengthening regional and multilateral cooperation. He attended the 2018 Globsec security forum, and was involved in investigating the networks of the Surabaya bombings

Two years after serving as director, on 19 July 2019 Andhika was promoted to become the agency's deputy for international cooperation, replacing Hamidin who was transferred to South Sulawesi as the province's police chief.

In August 2024 Andhika was nominated by President Joko Widodo as ambassador to Papua New Guinea. However, he was never summoned for a fit and proper test by the House of Representatives for the office. After Joko Widodo was replaced by Prabowo Subianto, Andhika was nominated for ambassador to Brazil in July 2025. His nomination was approved by the House of Representatives in a session on 8 July 2025. He was installed on 25 August 2025. He provided copies of his credentials to the secretary general of the foreign ministry Maria Laura da Rocha on 26 December 2025 and presented his credentials to President Luiz Inácio Lula da Silva on 3 February 2026.

== Personal life ==
Andhika is married to Tri Dewi Widyastuti and has four children.
