= Edi Yusup =

Indonesian diplomat (born 1961)

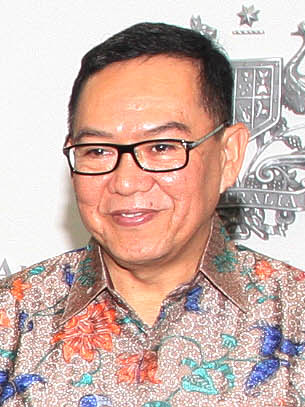

Ambassador of Indonesia to Brazil
- In office 7 January 2019 – December 2025
- President: Joko Widodo; Prabowo Subianto
- Preceded by: Toto Riyanto
- Succeeded by: Andhika Chrisnayudhanto

Personal details
- Born: June 2, 1961 (age 65) Bandung, Indonesia
- Children: 2
- Education: Hasanuddin University (S.E.); Murdoch University (M.A.)

Edi Yusup (born 2 June 1961) is an Indonesian diplomat who has served as the ambassador of Indonesia to Brazil since 2019. He was previously the director for East Asia and Pacific and deputy permanent representative to the United Nations and other international organizations in Geneva.

== Early life and education ==
Born in Bandung on 2 June 1961, Edi Yusup completed his elementary through senior high school education in his hometown. He pursued higher education at the Hasanuddin University where he received his undergraduate degree in economics in 1985. He later earned a master's degree from Murdoch University in 1992.

== Career ==
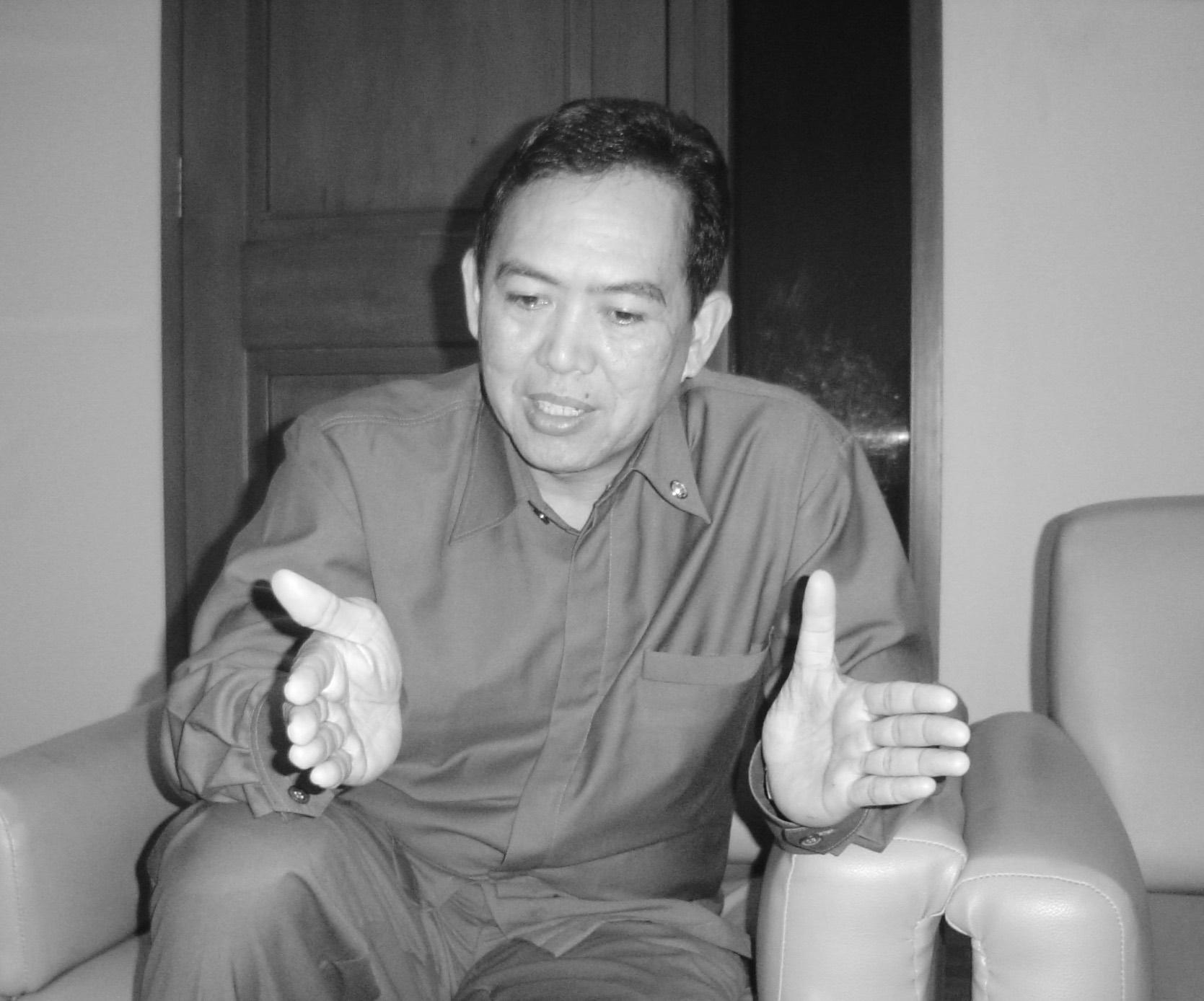
Edi Yusup as director for ASEAN economic cooperation.

Edi began his diplomatic career in 1986. He has completed all levels of diplomatic courses and specialized training both in Indonesia and abroad. His first posting was to the embassy in Seoul from 1992 to 1996. This was followed by an assignment at the Indonesia consulate general in Ho Chi Minh City from 1998 to 2002. He was then posted to the permanent mission of the Republic of Indonesia in Geneva between 2004 and 2007, where he served as the Indonesian negotiator to the WTO meetings. Following this, he was appointed director for ASEAN economic cooperation in 2007, a role where he was involved in negotiation meetings on WTO issues, G-20, G-33, South Center, Cairns Group, Asia-African Regional Organization Conference, ASEAN Economic Ministers Meeting, and the Organization of Islamic Conference.

After serving as director for ASEAN economic cooperation, on 30 July 2010 Edi became consul general to Guangzhou. He then served as deputy permanent representative to the United Nations and other international organizations in Geneva, during which he served as the permanent mission's chargé d'affaires ad interim in 2012. In 2013, Edi was elected to lead a meeting of experts on the development of public-private partnership for developing nations at the UN Trade and Development forum. Edi was recalled to Jakarta afterwards, and became the director for East Asia and Pacific sometime in 2015.

In September 2018, President Joko Widodo named Edi as a nominee for ambassador to Brazil . After passing an assessment held by the House of Representative's first commission in October, on 7 January 2019 he was installed as ambassador. He presented his credentials to the President of Brazil Jair Bolsonaro on 4 June 2019. He was tasked by the government to market Indonesia abroad and increase economic cooperation between Indonesia and Brazil, especially through business-to-business contacts in forums. As ambassador, he overseen the launch of negotiations for the Indonesia-Mercosur CEPA in December 2021 and has worked to promote Indonesian export commodities like palm oil, textiles, and herbal supplements to address a trade deficit. Edi received the Order of the Southern Cross from Secretary of Asia and the Pacific Susan Kleebank on 28 November 2025. He handed over his duties to charge d'affaires ad interim Gopokson T. Situmorang shortly after.

== Personal life ==
Edi is married and has two children.
