= Astana Anyar bombing =

2022 suicide bombing attack in Indonesia

- Location: 6.9278°S 107.6003°E; Astana Anyar police station, Bandung, West Java, Indonesia
- Date: 7 December 2022 ±08:20 WIB (UTC+7)
- Attack type: Suicide bombing; terrorism
- Deaths: 2 (including the perpetrator)
- Injuries: 11
- Perpetrators: Jamaah Ansharut Daulah; Jemaah Islamiyah (support)
- No. of participants: 1
- Motive: Islamic extremism Anti-government sentiment Anti-police sentiment Passing of the 2022 Bill of Indonesian Criminal Code into law

On 7 December 2022, at around 8:20 AM Western Indonesia Time (UTC+7), a suicide bombing incident occurred at an Indonesian National Police station in Astana Anyar District, Bandung, West Java. The attacker and one police officer were killed by the explosion, while 11 people were injured including 3 police officers.

Police General Listyo Sigit Prabowo, Chief of the Indonesian National Police said that the perpetrator was affiliated to the Jamaah Ansharut Daulah (JAD) Bandung branch.

== Attack ==
The attack involved a lone male attacker who entered the Astana Anyar police station's premises. The attacker rode a motorcycle and stopped near the field where the police were having morning drills. The attacker suddenly drew out a bladed weapon and charged towards the police, breaking into the ceremony before he blew himself up.

Soon after the attack, a video of the attack went viral on the internet. The injured police officers were taken to the local hospital. In total, 9 people were injured by the attack. One of the police officers later died after succumbing to his injuries, 3 hours after the attack.

The police cordoned off the Astana Anyar - Bojong Loa road, where the incident happened. The front part of the office was heavily damaged by the explosion.

== Perpetrator ==
Identification later found that the perpetrator was a Bandung local, known by the nom de guerre Abu Muslim bin Wahid. He was a former recidivist formerly prisoned in Nusa Kambangan Island for 4 years. He was an electrician prior to his death. He was captured in 2017 at Babakan Ciparay District, Bandung for being involved in terrorism and sentenced in the same year. He was released in 2021 after completing his sentence in full term.

According to his step-grandfather, the perpetrator already distanced himself from the family for a long time, even before being captured by the police in 2017. He said that he didn’t even know that the perpetrator got married. His grandfather said that his reclusiveness became prominent after he joined some Islamic discussion groups after his graduation from senior high school in 2006. According to the Police, he joined Darul Islam Areal Commandment VII (which was centered in the South Priangan region and operates across West Java) network but quit the organization after the JAD formed.

The perpetrator moved from Bandung to Sukoharjo, Central Java and lived in a rented small dormitory, and moved here around September 2021. The perpetrator's neighbor revealed that the perpetrator and his family lived there. He lived with his wife and two children. One of the children was from his wife's previous marriage, while the other was the couple's child. The neighbor revealed that the perpetrator, despite his job as an electrician, worked as a parking clerk when he moved to the dormitory and expressed his intention to change his job to be a kue pukis hawker sometime prior the attack but was unable to do so because he lacked money. Locals also reported that he often traveled out of the town prior the attack.

Police General Listyo Sigit Prabowo revealed that the perpetrator was classified as "red status" from the National Counter Terrorism Agency (BNPT) deradicalization program, indicating that at the time he was released from the prison, he was still prone to being and capable of returning to his radicalist and extremist ways easily and still had some Islamic radicalism and Islamic extremism. General Listyo also added that the perpetrator was very difficult to be deradicalized as the perpetrator is an extreme avoidant and hard to be approached. During his time in prison, he always attempted to ideologically convert his fellow prisoners. He also rejected any attempts of deradicalization. Neighbors reported that the perpetrator was asocial.

The police secured a motorcycle used by the perpetrator, and police attempted to track the identity of the owner to cover the possible perpetrator identity. The owner, as matched by the police registry was found. It later discovered that the owner, had already sold the motorcycle some years ago prior the attack, but apparently the buyer did not change the motorcycle's police registration information. Knowing that the perpetrator was not the buyer and was almost being accused as the terrorist, the former owner issued his clarification to the media and stated that he is not part of the terrorist network, and his former motorcycle current condition and whereabout were out of his knowledge.

The perpetrator's wife hysterically cried in distress after knowing that her husband killed himself after committing the bombing. The neighbor who noticed her distress came to the perpetrator's family's dorm room only to learn that an unknown person sent the picture of the perpetrator's disintegrated remains to her phone. However, the neighbor noticed that sometime later, two unknown people came to the couple's room and took away the family without talking and just left the room. It later revealed that she was taken by her family. His family and his wife family both rejected to receive the perpetrator's remains after knowing that he is a terrorist. Eventually, his wife family accepted the remains to buried it properly.

== Investigation ==
In aftermath of the attack, Detachment 88 and Gegana Squad (Bomb Disposal Unit) of the Mobile Brigade Corps (Brimob) were sent to the attack site. The teams discovered shrapnel and the attacker’s body fragments at the location. Additionally, authorities disposed of remaining explosives on the scene, creating a second controlled explosion at approximately 10:45 AM. The BNPT issued a statement which speculated that the perpetrator was likely driven by anti-police sentiment, and was likely affiliated to an ISIS network.

The explosive used by the perpetrator found to be TATP loaded in the perpetrator 's backpack. It was still unknown what kind of device used to carry the bomb, either a pressure cooker bomb or "Tupperware bomb" developed by Islamic State. Later investigation found that the device used by the perpetrator was a pair of pressure cooker bombs, but only one exploded. Another one was thrown away out from the perpetrator body.

The perpetrator's motorcycle was found and secured by the police. On the motorcycle, a statement written by the perpetrator was found, which stated his hatred of the Indonesian government and police. In particular, he resented the newly passed 2022 Bill of Indonesian Criminal Code and branding the law as a "shirk and kafir"-made product. The statement also included a quotation quoted from the Qur'an to attack the infidels. A sticker of the Islamic State's black standard was also discovered on the motorcycle. A "1515" mark were also found in his motorcycle. As revealed by Soyan Tsauri, a former terrorist-turned-terrorist observer, the mark is known as secret communicating identity of a cell belonged to the Jamaah Ansharut Daulah. Al Chaidar, Malikussaleh University lecturer and Islamic terrorism expert, suspected the perpetrator came from the Jamaah Ansharut Daulah member.

A dozen of handwritten protest pamphlets condemning the passage of the 2022 Indonesian Criminal Code authored by the perpetrator were discovered and secured by the police.

Detachment 88 launched a raid to the perpetrator's home.

Investigators pursued his terror network. BNPT also investigated a group that aided the perpetrator and his terror network. 18 witnesses including from the perpetrator's family were summoned by the Police for interrogation.

On 14 December 2022, the Police discovered several JAD safe houses, including one safe house used by the perpetrator to plan the attack. Detachment 88 confiscated several sacks full of suspicious materials from the safehouses. One suspected accomplice of the perpetrator, which lived in one of the safehouse, found to be already checked out from his place 1 or 2 days before the attack and no longer returned to his place On 21 December 2022, the Police announced that 26 people related to the incident had been arrested from 5 provinces: West Java, Central Java, Riau, West Sumatra, and North Sumatra. From 26 captured terrorists, 14 were JAD members, and 12 were Jemaah Islamiyah members. Among the arrested, 6 were found to be JAD Bandung branch members directly connected to the incident. A stash of documents also recovered by the Police from Cicendo. From the documents, it was revealed that JAD Bandung branch planned to attack several Police stations across West Java and West Java Regional Head Office.

On 27 July 2023, the perpetrator's wife captured because she was actually a part of the terror network itself and one who indoctrinate the perpetrator to commit the suicide bombing. On 5 August 2023, the bomb maker was captured. The bomb maker was a former Jamaah Ansharut Tauhid member until his eventual joining to JAD. The bomb maker also revealed as a disciple of Dr. Azahari Husin. It later revealed that JAD used 2 fictitious charity organizations to fund their attack.

== Aftermath ==
Indonesian National Police announced that the wounded victims will receive compensation from the state.

Local businesses at Astana Anyar road temporarily closed their businesses until further notice from the Police. The road partially opened on the next day, but the police station remained inaccessible and blocked from the sight using zinc sheets and guarded with some Brimob members.

In the national scale, the attack made the management at businesses increase their security and alertness. Indonesian Chamber of Commerce and Industry, Indonesia Businesses Association, and Indonesian Shopping Center Association issued statements that the business will run as usual, but their security and alertness will be increased. Security in malls, trading centers, grocery, and other businesses office reportedly increased, and security patrol performed by their security apparatus intensified. They are committed for the customer's safety and convenience in their places.

The bombing incident happened 3 days before the Kaesang Pangarep, Joko Widodo younger son, marriage event. Despite being far away from the incident location, Kaesang's older brother and Mayor of Surakarta, Gibran Rakabuming Raka, announced that the event would have a security layer increased as a preventive measure due to high-level and high-profile figures such as the President himself, Vice President, and other state officials will gather at the event. Ridwan Habib, a University of Indonesia lecturer and terrorist observer, asked the Police to increase their alertness and secure the event and also during Christmas and New Year events, as terrorists will act in those times.

The only police killed in this incident, Police 2nd Sub-Inspector Sofyan Didu, was posthumously promoted to the Police 1st Sub-inspector rank and was buried with honors in his private family's burial lot at Sukasari District, Bandung.

On 30 December 2022, BNPT announced that the agency would initiate a comprehensive evaluation of its deradicalization program, including stricter monitoring of the BNPT's terrorist red list. A new monitoring system will also be developed by the BNPT for the military and law enforcement intelligence to monitor the terrorists and their networks.

Months after the incident, on 16 March 2023, BNPT established an anti-terror watch network in Bandung. The anti-terror watch network comprised 200 members from the West Java Province Terror Prevention Coordinating Forum, religious figures, public figures, and representatives from student organizations.

On 15 November 2024, a poison pen letter claimed to be written by Jamaah Ansharut Daulah was sent to Parahyangan Catholic University in attempt to terrorize the upcoming graduation ceremony. The letter also made a reference to the Astana Anyar bombing.

== Responses ==
Detachment 88 officer Police Grand Commissioner Aswin Siregar asked the public not to panic and assured that the police were investigating the incident. West Java Governor Ridwan Kamil and Head of West Java Regional Police Police Inspector General Suntana visited the location to monitor the situation. Police stations elsewhere in the country heightened their alertness and increased their guard in response to the attack.

Ridwan Kamil requested the public not to share pictures or videos of the bombing.

The Indonesian Solidarity Party issued a statement condemning the terrorist act. The ruling party, Indonesian Democratic Party of Struggle, also issued a condemnation statement and urged the Police to investigate the incident completely.

Executive Office of the President of the Republic of Indonesia issued a condemnation statement. In revelation that the perpetrator's motive was to protest the recently passed 2022 Indonesia Criminal Code, the office issued an additional statement to urge the people who disagree with the law to apply for the judicial review to the Constitutional Court, not to commit bombings or attack government authorities.

A condemnation statement was also issued by the People's Consultative Assembly.

Major Islamic mass organizations such as Nahdlatul Ulama and Muhammadiyah as well as Indonesian Ulema Council (MUI) condemned the attack.

People's Representative Council member from the Democratic Party Santoso publicly mocked the BNPT for being inept and ineffective in combating terrorism and its inability to prevent the attack. In addition, he also mocked the Indonesian State Intelligence Agency (BIN) for its failure in preventing the attack, as both agencies are supposed to provide intelligence to deter terrorism. He requested that both agencies increase their capabilities to prevent future attacks. Another People's Representative Council member from the Indonesian Democratic Party of Struggle, Bambang Wuryanto, criticized the BIN, BNPT, and National Police for their intelligence failure and ineffectiveness of their deradicalization program. He also called for the formation of a proposal for an extensive internal security law, similar to the laws that existed in other countries. Vice President Ma'ruf Amin also requested these agencies to evaluate the deradicalization program and also requested the MUI to reactivate and intensified the MUI Task Force for Counterterrorism to assist the law enforcement and promoting the moderate Islam to counter the Islamic extremism.

Minister of Religious Affairs, Yaqut Cholil Qoumas, condemned the attack. He appreciated the Police for swiftly identifying the perpetrator and stopping further speculation on the perpetrator and his motive. He asked the public to combat terrorism together with the government. He requested for the people to prioritize dialogue for reaching agreement over disagreement, and not to use force or terror to express the disagreement and/or forcing another people into agreement or submission.
