= 2019 Medan suicide bombing =

Terrorist attack in Indonesia

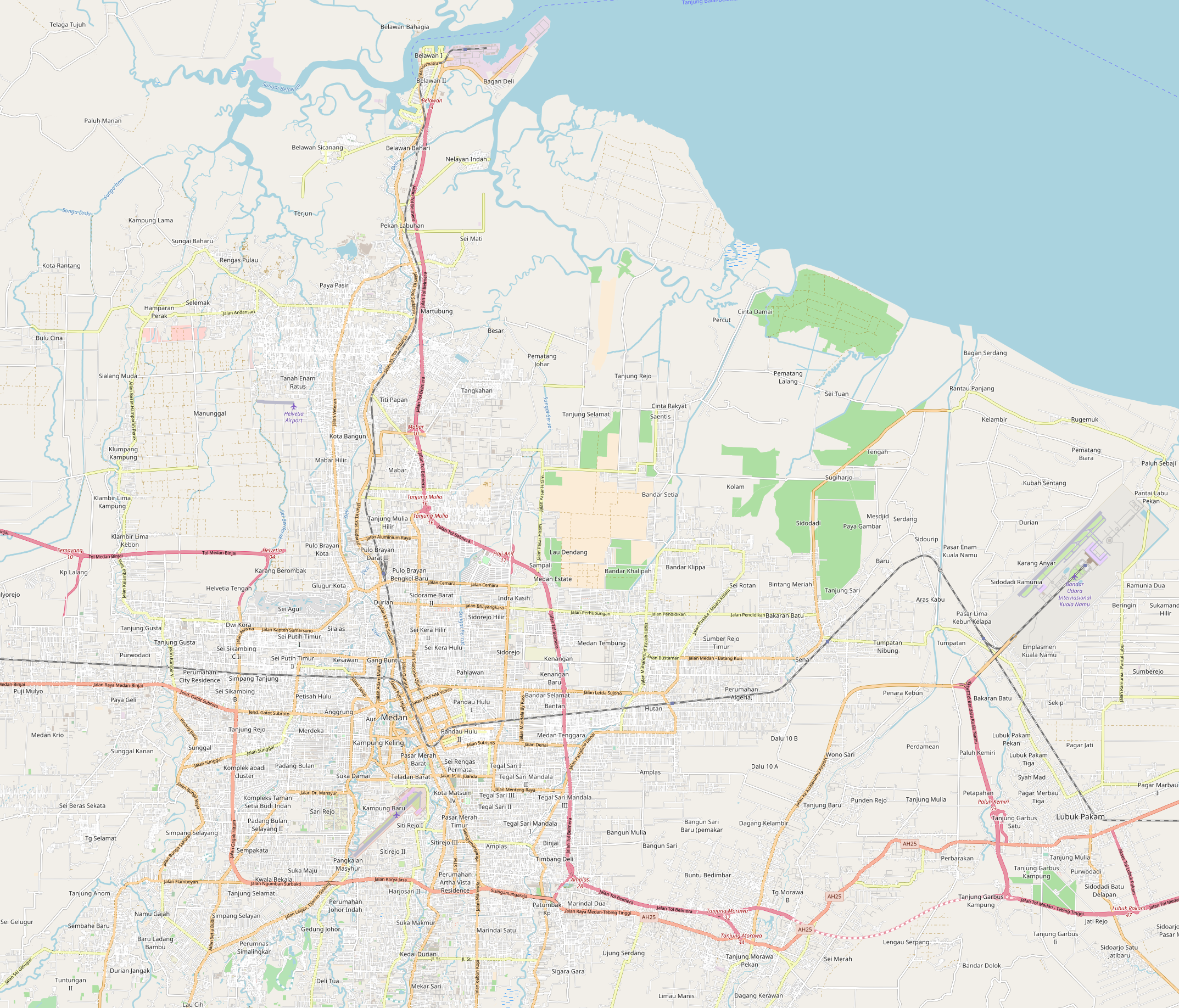
- 2019 Medan suicide bombing (Medan) Location of the attacked police headquarters
- Location: 3.6°N 98.684°E; Medan, North Sumatra, Indonesia
- Date: 13 November 2019; 8:40 AM WIB
- Target: Police officers
- Attack type: Terrorist attack; Suicide bombing
- Deaths: 1 (attacker)
- Injuries: 6
- Perpetrator: Jamaah Ansharut Daulah
- Motive: Islamic extremism

A suicide bombing was conducted in Medan, North Sumatra, Indonesia, on 13 November 2019, targeting the city's metropolitan police (Polrestabes) headquarters. No person other than the attacker was killed in the attack, though six others were injured. The single attacker was affiliated with the Jamaah Ansharut Daulah.

== Bombing ==
The attack on the Medan Police's headquarters occurred on 13 November 2019, at around 8:40 AM, shortly after the conclusion of a routine morning roll call by the police officers. The explosion occurred within the grounds of the headquarters but outside the building itself. According to reports, the attacker had blended in with a group queueing to obtain certificates of good conduct before detonating the bomb in the parking lot. Other eyewitness accounts reported the attacker wearing a jacket and backpack, and that he had attempted to rush through police examination at the building's entrance.

The attacker was initially believed to be a lone wolf, and the explosion injured four police officers and two civilians aside from killing the attacker. In the aftermath of the explosion, police recovered the attacker's body parts, nails, and parts of the explosive device.

== Perpetrator ==
Though his body was blown up, the perpetrator was identified from fingerprints as a 24-year old resident of the city, Rabbial Muslim Nasution, who had recently been an online motorcycle driver. Initial investigations explored Nasution's connections with the Islamic State-affiliated Jamaah Ansharut Daulah (JAD), and several of his family members were questioned by police. His body was buried in the city, despite objections. According to his parents-in-law, Nasution had shown a significant change in behavior in the six months leading up to the suicide attack, which police officials linked to indoctrination by a cleric, who was being sought after by the national police.

Police later reported that Nasution's wife had planned another terror attack in Bali, and she was arrested. Following further investigations, the Indonesian Police (Polri) stated that the JAD was behind the attack.

== Reactions ==
Following the attack, Polri launched several raids in parts of the country, and a week after the attack reported that 74 terror suspects had been apprehended - more than half of which were arrested outside North Sumatra. The Densus 88 shot dead two alleged bomb assemblers following an ambush in Deli Serdang Regency. Some of the suspects were known to have been attending training camps in Karo Regency, and weapons including improvised firearms, airsoft guns, traditional blades, and bows were confiscated.

President of Indonesia Joko Widodo ordered for the perpetrators of the attack to be investigated and apprehended. Deputy Speaker of the People's Consultative Assembly Zulkifli Hasan commented that Polri had been caught off guard by the attack, as with the attack on security minister Wiranto.
