= 2020 South Daha attack =

Terrorist incident in Indonesia

- Location: South Hulu Sungai Regency, South Kalimantan, Indonesia
- Date: 1 June 2020
- Attack type: Sword attack
- Weapon: Katana
- Deaths: 2 died (a policemen and the attacker)
- Perpetrator: Jamaah Ansharut Daulah

On 1 June 2020, 02:15 Central Indonesia Time, a man carrying gasoline torched a police car parked in the South Daha, South Hulu Sungai Regency regional police office and attacked the police stationed there with a katana. During this attack, there were three policemen guarding the office at the early morning. One policeman, Brigadier Leo Nardo Latupapua was killed by the attacker. After the attacker killed Leo, the other two police officers tried to flee & locked themselves in another room asking for help using their phones. The attacker refused to surrender and was shot dead by the police that arrived in the area. While no organization claimed responsibility for the attack, police found that the attacker carried an ISIS flag and a paper containing an ultimatum about the Islamic state & jihad. Later two suspected terrorists belonging to Jamaah Ansharut Daulah were arrested by police.
