= Surabaya bombings =

2018 terrorist attacks in Indonesia

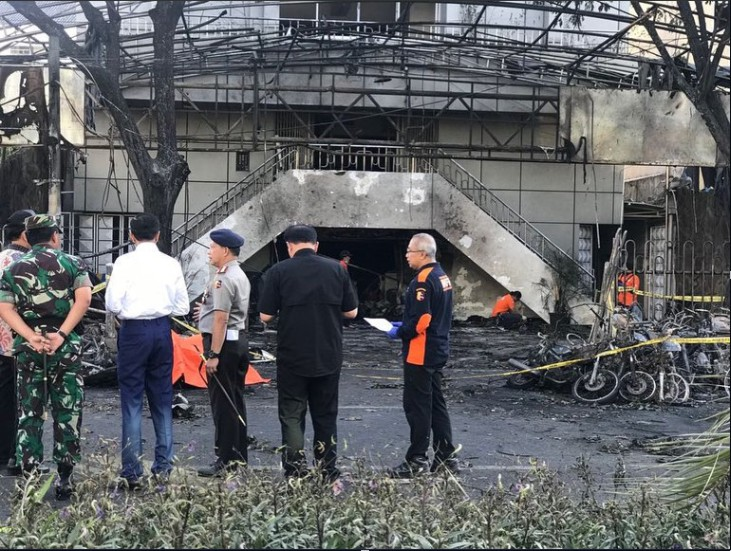
- Indonesian President Joko Widodo (in white) visiting one of the churches that were attacked by terrorists on 13 May

- Surabaya bombings (Surabaya) Location of the attacked churches, police headquarters in Surabaya, and Wonocolo apartment in Sidoarjo
- Location: 7°17′20″S 112°45′37″E 7°16′54″S 112°43′57″E 7°15′50″S 112°43′33″E 7°20′56″S 112°41′50″E 7°14′20″S 112°44′12″E; Surabaya and Sidoarjo, Indonesia
- Date: 13–14 May 2018; 13 May attacks: 06:30 – 07:53 WIB (UTC+07:00) (Surabaya churches); 20:30 – 21:20 WIB (UTC+07:00) (Sidoarjo); 14 May attack: 08:50 WIB (UTC+07:00) (Police HQ)
- Target: Christians, police officers
- Attack type: Suicide bombings
- Deaths: 28 (15 victims, 13 attackers) (Note: Does not include terrorist suspects killed in shootouts during raids)
- Injuries: 57
- Perpetrator: Jamaah Ansharut Daulah (Southeast Asian branch of the Islamic State)
- Assailants: Dita Supriyanto family Anton Febryanto family Tri Murtono family
- Motive: Islamic extremism; Anti-Christian sentiment; Alleged response to the disbandment of Hizbut Tahrir Indonesia

The Surabaya bombings were a series of terrorist attacks that initially occurred on 13 May 2018 in three churches in Surabaya, the second largest city in Indonesia and the capital of East Java province. The explosions occurred at Immaculate Saint Mary Catholic Church (Gereja Katolik Santa Maria Tak Bercela, SMTB) on Ngagel Madya Street; Indonesia Christian Church (Gereja Kristen Indonesia, GKI) on Diponegoro Street; and Surabaya Central Pentecostal Church (Gereja Pantekosta Pusat Surabaya, GPPS) on Arjuno Street. The first explosion took place at the SMTB Church; the second and third explosions followed within an hour.

The fourth bombing occurred in an apartment complex in Sidoarjo, a regency located south of Surabaya, after the terrorists accidentally set off the bombs inside the room; three were killed and a teenager and two children were injured. The fifth bombing occurred the next day at the Surabaya Police Headquarters (Mapolrestabes Surabaya); two perpetrators detonated their devices while they were being checked by police at the entrance.

As of 1 June 2018, 28 people were killed, including the suicide bombers. Around 50 others were injured; several were in critical condition. The attacks occurred just days after the standoff at Mako Brimob in Depok, in which five police officers were killed. The attacks are the deadliest terror attack in Indonesia since the 2002 Bali bombings.

The bombings were regarded as one of the most sophisticated and complex terror attacks in Indonesia. It was also the first of its kind in Indonesian history in which children as young as nine years old participated.

== Background ==
It was estimated in 2017 that hundreds of Indonesians went to Syria or Iraq to fight for ISIL before returning to Indonesia. The returning individuals are placed through a deradicalization program by the National Agency for Combating Terrorism, and are put on a watchlist for the agency and local governments alike. Several terrorist attacks, such as the Thamrin attacks, were orchestrated by the returnees or local extremists who pledged alliance to ISIL.

In 2016, President Joko Widodo requested lawmakers to revise the country's anti-terrorism laws, which were published in 2003 and 2013. He questioned the law's effectiveness, as the government was legally unable to arrest perpetrators of the Thamrin attacks preemptively. The revision encountered resistance, with critics remarking that the law would allow arbitrary arrests. Later on, opposition arose from human rights groups due to the involvement of the Indonesian National Armed Forces in the bill, which would put them in a law enforcement role. Regardless, the bill continued to press on, although it was put on hold in late February 2018 as both the military involvement and the legal definition of terrorism came into debate.

Between 8 May and 10 May, a standoff occurred at the Mobile Brigade Corps' headquarters in Depok, resulting in the deaths of five police officers. While the incident and hostage situation ended with the 155 rioters surrendering, in the aftermath, police shot dead four individuals who were suspected terrorists allegedly travelling "to help the rioting prisoners". Amaq News Agency claimed ISIL was responsible.

== Bombings ==
=== First ===
The first attack occurred around 07:07 WIB (UTC+07:00) in front of the SMTB Church. Eyewitnesses said the attack occurred shortly after the first mass. Survivors said the perpetrators immediately entered the church without taking the parking ticket first. As people gathered in the hall, several witnesses said they saw two people riding a motorcycle were being stopped by a security officer named Aloysius Bayu Rendra Wardhana at the church's entrance. Shortly afterwards, the perpetrators detonated the bomb. The blast immediately killed a child and the security officer.

The first attack was captured on camera. In the first video, the perpetrators immediately entered the church without stopping and then detonated the bomb. The second video showed the bombing from a front door near the entrance. At the time, people were walking out of the church, and several others were entering the church as the first mass had finished. The perpetrators immediately detonated their devices as they were being stopped by security. As the explosion happened, multiple people inside the church began to panic. Several people who lived nearby mistook the explosion as an earthquake. The church's windows were blown out, and the building located at the entrance was destroyed, but the church exterior suffered minimal damage. Authorities reported that five people and two perpetrators were killed.

=== Second ===
The second attack occurred around 07:45 at the GKI, located on Diponegoro Street. Eyewitnesses said the perpetrator was a woman wearing black veil and black niqāb. She was also carrying two bags. At the time of the incident, she was taking her two children, who were also wearing veils and niqābs. Eyewitnesses said the woman was trying to enter the church when a security officer named Yesaya Bayang suddenly blocked her. She then hugged the security officer and detonated the bomb. Not long after that, her children detonated their explosive devices. Explosions were heard as many as five times. The security guard who tried to stop them was critically injured by the blast. No civilian casualties were reported, but the three perpetrators were killed.

=== Third ===
The third attack occurred at the GPPS, located on Arjuno Street on 07:53 WIB. At least two explosions were heard in the third attack. The first explosion originated from a Toyota Avanza. According to eyewitness, the driver of the car rammed the entrance gate and struck parked vehicles in the church. At the time, people were going to drive their vehicles out. The explosion destroyed five cars and 30 motorcycles. Two people were initially reported killed, and many were injured, several seriously. Another bomb exploded from the same car. Two other bombs were discovered near the church, forcing a bomb disposal unit to be dispatched. According to them, two bombs were successfully detonated while the other two malfunctioned. Authorities later said ten civilians and the perpetrator were killed.

Emergency services arrived approximately two minutes after the first attack. The East Java Regional Police said that a total of 28 people were killed and 43 more were injured in the three attacks, with several in critical condition. The police immediately cleared and cordoned the area.

=== Fourth ===
Around 20:00, a bomb exploded at the Wonocolo apartment complex in the nearby city of Sidoarjo. The incident occurred when the police raided the apartment. Three adults in a single apartment room were killed, while three children occupying the same room survived, all from the same family. According to the regional police chief Inspector General Machfud Arifin, the victims might have been planning to conduct attacks similar to the ones perpetrated at the churches, but the devices exploded prematurely.

Nearby residents said they thought the explosion was caused by exploding liquid petroleum gas. Residents who lived in or nearby the apartment complex were evacuated from the vicinity. The police later added that residents were prohibited to return to their homes until further notice. Police cordoned the area for investigation, and roads nearby were closed. Accounts from eyewitnesses revealed that two eleven-year-old children were severely injured in the blast; they were immediately evacuated. At least five explosions were heard.

=== Fifth ===
On 14 May, multiple suicide bombings occurred at the Surabaya Police headquarters (Mapolrestabes Surabaya) on 08:50 WIB. The East Java Regional Police said two bombers detonated their devices at the building checkpoint. Police said four policemen and six civilians were wounded, while four suicide bombers were killed.

The attack, which occurred at the entrance of the police headquarters, was captured on camera. The video showed a black Toyota Avanza entering the checkpoint when four people riding two motorcycles suddenly entered the area. The motorcycles were halted by a group of policemen, after which the perpetrators detonated their explosive devices. In the video, one of the perpetrators was a woman.

In the aftermath of the attack, an eight-year-old child, whom the police suspect was the perpetrators' daughter, was brought to the police station to assist in the attack, was found walking and screaming amidst the bodies. Police said she was in critical condition.

Police immediately closed nearby roads. Businesses and shops were ordered to be close in the vicinity of the area. All kinds of service in the police headquarters were temporarily terminated in response to the attack.

== Casualties ==
As of 1 June 2018, 15 civilians and 13 suicide bombers were killed. Among them were children aged 11 and 8, identified as Evan and Nathan, and two security officers who were trying to stop the perpetrators from entering the churches. Aloysius Bayu Rendra Wardhana, a security volunteer; and Yesaya Bayang, a security officer, were regarded as heroes by locals for successfully stopping the perpetrators from entering SMTB and GKI Diponegoro, respectively. A security officer succumbed to his injuries on 19 May. Another victim succumbed to his injuries 18 days after the bombings.

Injured victims of the blasts were treated in eight hospitals. The local branch of the Indonesian Red Cross reported an upsurge in blood donations, with 600 people donating blood that day compared to the routine target of 400.

== Investigation ==
Hours after the attacks, the Chief of the Indonesian National Police Tito Karnavian, said in a news conference that Jamaah Ansharut Daulah, a local branch of the Islamic State, was the group responsible for perpetrating the attacks. The group was responsible for the previous church bombing in Samarinda in 2016 and was also blamed for a series of attacks against Indonesian police in 2016 and 2017.

He later added that based on eyewitness accounts, the attackers were probably from the same family. Multiple people claimed that prior to the attack, the woman and her two children involved in the second attack were dropped off from a Toyota Avanza. According to Tito, the man who drove the Avanza was her husband. He then drove the car away and conducted the third attack. Their sons were the ones who drove the motorcycle in the first attack.

According to official reports, the perpetrators had recently returned from "education" in Syria. The family, according to Tito, was among the 500 people who were being monitored by the government.

Australian counter-terrorism expert Professor Greg Barton of Deakin University said the perpetrators were "self-contained", deliberately cutting off communication with the other members via digital communications to avoid detection from the police. According to him, this was similar to the November 2015 Paris attacks. He later added that the weak anti-terror law in Indonesia allowed local extremists to travel to Iraq and Syria with ease, and that those who might have been involved with the Islamic State wouldn't be punished by the authorities. There was also considerable concern of the use of children in terror attacks.

=== Motive ===
Indonesian National Police revealed that the attacks were directly ordered by ISIL as revenge for the imprisonment of Aman Abdurrahman, the leader of JAD and JAT in Indonesia. Abdurrahman should have been released from jail in August 2017, but he was arrested again for supplying weapons and funds for the terrorists who executed the 2016 Jakarta attacks. He was in prison at the time for his role in conducting training for terrorists in Aceh.

In response to his imprisonment, the leadership in JAD was handed to Zainal Anshori. However, Anshori was immediately arrested after authorities said he was involved in weapon smuggling in Mindanao, Philippines. This reportedly infuriated the members of the JAD and JAT, and in response, their members started to attack civilians and police officers. The first major attack was the 2018 Mako Brimob standoff, which occurred days before the Surabaya bombings.

=== Raids and arrests ===
Hours after the incident in Wonocolo, Indonesian police raided a house in Masanganwetan, Sukodono, Sidoarjo. During the raid, a shootout erupted between a suspected terrorist and the police. The terrorist was later shot and killed. He was identified as Budi Satrio. Two men and two women were found on the site and were arrested. The police said pipe bombs were found at the site. Several ambulances were dispatched to the area. Three other suspects were arrested in Surabaya, with the police officials claiming they had planned further attacks, although the targeted locations were not disclosed. In total, the raids in Sidoarjo and Surabaya killed two suspects and arrested seven others.

Widespread raids and arrests were conducted by Detachment 88 in Bekasi, Sukabumi, Palembang, Tangerang and Cianjur. In the Cianjur raid, four suspected terrorists were killed after a shootout in a bus terminal. They had carried explosive, bomb-tipped arrows and allegedly planned to attack the Brimob headquarters. According to the police, as many as eight raids were conducted throughout Indonesia. They added that two terrorists were killed for resisting arrest.

On 15 May, two days after the initial bombings, a shootout occurred between Detachment 88 personnel and a group suspected to be affiliated with the bombers in the Manukan Kulon kelurahan (administrative village) in Surabaya. A man around the age of 40, who was part of the group, was killed. In a raid in Tanjung Balai Asahan, North Sumatra, at least two people were shot by the police and were later arrested. Three residents of Malang were also arrested.

On 16 May, another shootout occurred at a house in Kuciran Indah, Tangerang. Another house was raided by the police, and three people were arrested. The Indonesian police revealed that they were members of the Jakarta JAD. Several other people were arrested in East Java, Central Java, West Java, and Banten; while two were arrested in Sidoarjo. An anti-terror operation was also carried out in Probolinggo in a small "executive" musalla. Airguns, documents, and electronics were recovered from the area; and three people were arrested. The police announced that they had arrested 33 suspected terrorists across Indonesia. They added that ISIL flags, documents, and bombs were also recovered.

On the same day, the police defused 31 pipe bombs. The police said the total bombs that were recovered were as many as one truckload.

On 1 June, the Indonesian police announced that they had arrested another 37 suspects after a series of anti-terror operations across Indonesia. Four suspected terrorists were killed during shootouts. By mid-July, 197 suspected terrorists had been apprehended, of which 20 were killed.

=== Security ===
In Surabaya, the East Java Regional Police asked for cancellation of all Sunday services for the day in response to the attacks. The Jakarta Metropolitan Police raised Jakarta's terror alert level to the highest level (Level 1), effective from 13 May 2018 at 08:00 local time. The provinces of Central Java, Yogyakarta, and Riau Islands later followed Jakarta's action to raise the terror threat level, and the status was set to a national level by the Indonesian National Police. The police spokesman noted that the status was an internal one for police officers and that civilians should go about normally. Police officials said Jakarta would remain on that level for an indefinite time. As many as 8,000 police personnel were dispatched in Makassar, South Sulawesi, to guard churches and vital objects across the city. Police in Malang said roughly as many as 250 personnel would be dispatched across Malang to protect the city's churches. The Jakarta Metropolitan Police later lowered the status on 15 May 2018.

The West Java Regional Police said security throughout West Java was tightened in response to the attacks, and multiple police personnel would be dispatched across the area. The security at Ngurah Rai International Airport in Denpasar, Bali, would be tightened in response to the attacks. A prompt inspection was conducted at Soekarno-Hatta International Airport in Tangerang.

Police officers were deployed to the crime scenes to investigate and safeguard the areas, including members of Mobile Brigade Corps (Brimob) and the bomb squad. The police said that evacuation of victims was their primary focus. The bombings also prompted the Surabaya administration to cancel the Rujak Uleg Festival on Kembang Jepun Street, slated to be opened by Mayor of Surabaya Tri Rismaharini at noon, to commemorate the city's 725th anniversary. In response to the attacks on 13 May, schools across Surabaya were closed on 14 May. Mayor of Surabaya Tri Rismaharini later added that the period would be extended due to security concerns.

The terror threat throughout Indonesia was raised to its highest level. In response to the emergency, Indonesian Minister of Transportation Budi Karya Sumadi ordered security in every airport and seaport in Indonesia to be heightened to its maximum level.

== Perpetrators ==
The Indonesian National Police along with the East Java Regional Police confirmed that three families were responsible for the bombings in Surabaya and Sidoarjo.

Amaq News Agency claimed Islamic State in Iraq and the Levant (ISIL) responsibility for the attacks. The bomb that was used during the attacks was TATP or "Mother of Satan", a type that ISIL had used in Iraq and Syria.

=== Dita Supriyanto family ===
The church bombers were identified by the police as a family of six, headed by Dita Supriyanto, the father; and Puji Kuswati, the mother. They also involved their children, Yusuf Fadil (aged 18), Firman Halim (aged 16), Fadilah Sari (aged 12), and Pamela Rizkita (aged 9). Puji became the first female suicide bomber in Indonesia. Dita was responsible for the third attack. According to the police, the explosion in the third attack was the most powerful. The police said Puji was a resident of Banyuwangi, a city located approximately 306 kilometres (190 mi) southeast of Surabaya.

The Indonesian National Police announced that three types of bombs were used in the church attacks. According to them, the bomb in the third attack was the most destructive, being powerful enough to destroy dozens of vehicles and set fire to the front portion of the church. The first attack was carried out with motorcycle bomb, the second with belt bombs, and the third with a car bomb. The bombs in the second attack were strapped on the three perpetrators, Puji and her two daughters. This was evidenced by the examination of their bodies where their stomach areas were torn apart due to the force of the blast. Investigators are still trying to determine the exact type of bombs used in the first attack.

In the night of 13 May, a house in Wonorejo Asri in Rungkut, Surabaya, was stormed by the police. They discovered three highly explosive bombs, which were later defused by bomb disposal unit. Arrows and a bow were discovered at the back of the house. The police also recovered several books and documents from the house for investigation purposes. Indonesian National Police later revealed that Dita was the leader of the Surabaya branch of Jamaah Ansharut Daulah.

=== Anton Febryanto family ===
The East Java Regional Police identified the victims of the fourth bombing as members of a terrorist group that were planning to execute additional terror attacks on churches. The deceased family members are Anton Febryanto, the father; and Puspita Sari, the mother. They involved their own children, Rita Aulia Rahman (aged 17), Ainur Rahman (aged 15), Faizah Putri (aged 11), and Garida Huda Akbar (aged 10). The latter three survived. According to the police, the father was shot and killed by police officers. The explosion happened first; when the police reached the room, Anton threatened to push the trigger.

Indonesian National Police revealed that Anton's family had close ties with Dita Uprianto, while Anton also belonged to Jamaah Ansharut Tauhid.

=== Tri Murtono family ===
Authorities confirmed the identities of the Surabaya Police headquarters attackers using the family certificate carried by them. The father was identified as Tri Murtono (aged 50), while the mother was Tri Ernawati (aged 43). They also involved their two sons, Mohammad Dari Satri (aged 15) and Mohammad Dafa Amin (aged 18). Their surviving child, identified only as Ais (aged 8), survived the blasts after being saved by Rony Faisal. She was seated in front of her parents when the explosion happened.

=== Child involvement ===
The Indonesian National Police said it was the first time in Indonesian history that terrorists used their whole family, including their own children, to participate in a terror attack. Later reports revealed that some of the children actually had rejected their parents' offer to participate. One of the children, Ainur Rahman, who was involved in the Sidoarjo apartment complex bombing, said he had constantly rejected his parents' offer to join them in a terror attack, but he added that, at the time of the Wonocolo bombing, he didn't know his parents were producing a bomb inside the house. His siblings also rejected their parents' doctrines.

Similarly, one of the children of the church bombers, Firman Halim, was seen crying approximately a day before the attack. A security officer said all four of the church bombers' children were crying at the musalla. Authorities suspected they were crying because they knew that they were all going to blow themselves up the next day and that they were reluctant to die.

== Reactions ==
=== Domestic ===
The Communion of Churches in Indonesia (PGI) and the Bishops' Conference of Indonesia (KWI) released statements expressing their condolences and requesting political elites to not utilize the incident for political gain. The Indonesian Christian Student Movement (GMKI) called for President Widodo to evaluate the state's security apparatus.

Multiple Muslim clerics, Indonesian political and public figures condemned the attack. Nahdlatul Ulama (NU) general chairman Said Aqil Siradj condemned the attack, remarking that "Islam condemns any form of violence. There is not a single religion in the world that justifies violence as a way of life." Nahdlatul Ulama also requested people to report on actions that may lead to radicalism or terrorism. Ansor Youth Movement, a non-profit Islamic youth organization operating under the NU, strongly condemned the attacks as "a vile, vicious attacks against humanity", especially in a place of worship. The organization general chairman Yaqut Cholil Qoumas urged law enforcement officers to tackle the threat of radicalization in social media.

The Indonesian Ulema Council denounced the attack, stating that the Quran clearly stated that the act of murdering innocents is a serious sin. They later urged the government to tackle Islamic radicalism in Indonesia to prevent such terror attacks. Muhammadiyah condemned the attacks, adding that suicide bombings and killing of innocent people is not jihad. The Surabaya branch of Muhammadiyah dispatched personnel to help the treatment of the victims.

President Widodo flew to Surabaya, visiting the bombed churches and the hospitalized victims. Condemning the attacks as "barbaric acts", he strongly condemned the perpetrators particularly for their use of under-aged children as suicide bombers. Expressing condolences for the victims, he stated that the bombings were "a crime against humanity, unrelated with any religion", adding that he had ordered police chief Tito Karnavian to "unravel the bombers' network to its roots". He guaranteed that the government will cover the medical expenses of all the victims. He also stated that he will issue Government regulation in lieu of law (Perpu) if the lawmakers are unable to finalize the revision of anti-terrorism laws by June 2018. The Indonesian Ministry of Health confirmed President's statement that all hospital bills of the victims of the attacks will be paid by the government. Former Indonesian National Armed Forces commander Gatot Nurmantyo also denounced the attacks, stating that the perpetrators were trying to stain the image of Islam.

One of the most controversial religious figures in Indonesia, Bachtiar Nasir, a prominent member of the GNPF who had pushed for the imprisonment of the Christian–Chinese Governor of Jakarta Basuki Tjahaja Purnama, also condemned the attacks. He stated that Allah will condemn and punish them severely and offered his condolences to the victims of the attacks.

Political figures blamed Islamic radicalism as the cause of the attacks. The Indonesian House of Representatives stated that the government needs to do a "jihad" against terrorism. Masinton Pasaribu, a representative from the Indonesian Democratic Party of Struggle (PDI–P), stated that the attacks were an inhuman action and an extraordinary crime and the perpetrators should be severely punished. The Prosperous Justice Party (PKS), an Indonesian Islamic party, also condemned the attack and regarded the attack as highly anarchist. Party president Sohibul Iman, stated that all terror attacks are highly despicable, especially in places of worship. Spokesman from Golkar, the second largest party in Indonesia, stated that the attacks were nothing but a cowardice act from several irresponsible people who stained their own religion.

Prominent opposition party figure Fadli Zon also commented on the attacks. However, despite this, he was jeered and heavily criticized by the public as his criticism was viewed by many as an attack to the sitting President. Politicians from his party, Gerindra, joined the condemnation, without attacking the government. Gerindra chairman Prabowo Subianto expressed condolences for the attacks, asking the Indonesian people to maintain unity. While campaigning for the Central Java gubernatorial election in Banyumas, he instructed Gerindra cadres to protect places of worship. Spokesman from Indonesia's Democratic Party, Didi Iriawan, shared the same message. He stated that the attack was unacceptable and called for severe punishment to the perpetrators.

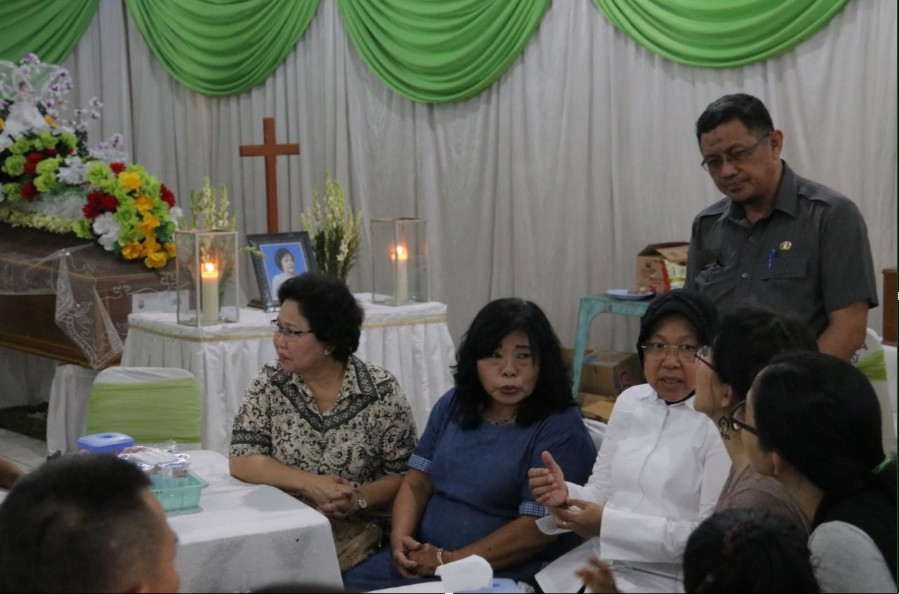
Surabaya Mayor Tri Rismaharini visited the relatives of the victims of the attacks on 14 May

Several vigils were held across Indonesia. Approximately 1,000 people participated in a vigil in Tugu Pahlawan in Surabaya where participants lit candles for the victims of the attacks. Vigils were also held in Bandung, Blitar, and Solo. There was a free distribution of prosthetic from volunteer groups for the survivors of the attacks.

In response to the bombings, Chief Tito called for a revision to the anti-terror bill and urged the members of the Indonesian House of Representatives to do so. According to Tito, terrorists easily evaded arrests due to the bill's weak mandates, and a stronger bill was needed in order to thwart terror plots. Many experts supported a revision and urged the government to consider it. Maksimus Ramses, a political expert from the Indonesian Political Analysis Institute, urged the government to form a special committee for the revision. According to him, if the anti-terror bill was revised by the government, the group who was responsible behind the attack Jamaah Ansharut Daulah (JAD) could be listed by the government as a terror group and terror attacks could be quickly prevented. The Indonesian House of Representatives later passed a stronger anti-terrorism law on 25 May. The law will grant law enforcers and members of the military more power in combatting terrorism.

=== International ===
The U.S. government condemned the attacks and later urged Americans to be aware of the security conditions in Indonesia, stating that they were ready to assist the Indonesian government in investigating the attacks. The U.K. government issued a travel advice for British nationals who were planning to visit Indonesia in response to the bombings. Australia issued similar travel advice for Australians in Indonesia. The Government of Hong Kong issued similar travel advice, stating that "Residents intending to visit the country or are already there should monitor the situation, exercise caution, attend to personal safety and avoid protests and large gatherings of people." The Irish, Canadian, French, Malaysian, Polish, Singaporean, Filipino and Chinese governments also issued travel advice for their citizens.

Singaporean President Halimah Yacob and Prime Minister Lee Hsien Loong wrote condolences letters to Indonesia, stating that the Government of Singapore strongly condemned the attacks. The Singaporean Ministry of Foreign Affairs later issued travel advice for Singaporeans in Indonesia. Australian Prime Minister Malcolm Turnbull condemned the attacks and offered condolences. Similarly, the Japanese government and the European Union offered their condolences and condemned the attacks.

During a sermon at Saint Peter's Basilica in the Vatican City, Pope Francis mentioned the attacks and requested prayers. United Nations and Organization for Islamic Cooperation secretaries-general António Guterres and Yousef Al-Othaimeen both also released statements condemning the attacks. Governments of Argentina, Mexico, Panama and Spain also decried the attacks.

=== Media ===
Facebook immediately activated its safety check after the attacks. Social media was flooded with Indonesians who voiced their condolences, prayers, frustration, and anger in response to the attacks. The hashtags #PrayForSurabaya, #BersatuLawanTeroris (English: #UnitedAgainstTerrorists), and #KamiTidakTakut (English: #WeAreNotAfraid) immediately went viral on Twitter. In the aftermath of the attacks, hundreds of social media accounts were blocked by Google, Facebook and Twitter. Telegram also blocked 280 accounts.

Indonesian National Police advised people not to share the graphic photos of the victims and the perpetrators of the attacks. The Indonesian Broadcasting Commission (KPI) also advised news stations not to broadcast photos of dead bodies or other graphic materials on television. Several TV stations cancelled their TV programs in response to the bombings. This announcement was stated on air.

=== Conspiracies and hoaxes ===
In the wake of the attacks, many people began to accuse the police and the government that the attack was a false flag, which resulted in numerous accounts being reported to the police. A woman was arrested on 14 May 2018 in Sukadana, West Kalimantan for her viral Facebook post accusing the government of having conducted the bombings as a false flag. She was a state junior high school (Sekolah Menengah Pertama Negeri, SMPN) headmaster. On the same day, a representative of a group named 212 Guard (Garda 212) also said that the bombings were false flag made to suppress those who were against the sitting government and demanding new president. The group itself was notorious for pushing the imprisonment of the Christian–Chinese Governor of Jakarta Basuki Tjahaja Purnama, hence their namesake which refers to the December 2016 Jakarta protests. He also said that the terrorists were innocent and should not be blamed for the bombings. The next day, another civil servant was arrested in Lhokseumawe, Aceh for hate speech related to the attacks. On 20 May 2018, a lecturer working at the University of North Sumatra was arrested for saying the same as the aforementioned headmaster. Many politicians, Mahfud MD for instance, condemned those who supported the false flag theory, stating that those people are psychopathic and basically are no different from the terrorists.

Hoaxes of bombs being detonated in other locations also spread through the internet. A man was arrested in Duren Sawit subdistrict of Jakarta for creating a post on Facebook saying a church there was attacked as well. He claimed to have intended it as a prank.

=== Rise of Islamophobia ===
In the immediate aftermath of the attacks, there was a rise in Islamophobia in Indonesia, even among Muslims. These hate crimes, however, were specifically targeted to niqab wearing women and Muslim men with long beards. Reports revealed that niqab wearing women were harassed, stared at and called terrorists. Police stated that these hate crimes couldn't be tolerated, later added that even one of the relatives of the victims of the attacks was a niqab wearing woman.

Several social experiments to tackle Islamophobia were later conducted across Indonesia. In Jakarta, a community of niqabis held an act of solidarity to the victims of the attack. They later voiced their support to the police to tackle terrorism.

== Pekanbaru sword attack ==
On 16 May 2018, a group of men attacked the Riau Regional Police headquarters in Pekanbaru, Riau. The attack started when a white Toyota Avanza rammed into the police station and struck people and vehicles, including two journalists from tvOne and MNCTV. Police said masked men carrying katanas attacked and hacked several people in the station. All but one of the attackers were shot dead. One police officer was killed. Two police officers and two journalists were injured. In the immediate aftermath of the attack, the street where the police HQ located was closed. Bomb disposal unit was called to the area as "cables and stuffs" were found inside the Avanza.

One of the attackers who escaped from the site was arrested by the police. The four dead attackers were identified as Mursalim, Suwardi, Adi Sufiyan, and Daud. All of them were residents of Dumai. Hours after the attack, raids were carried out across Dumai, which was located around 178 kilometres (111 mi) north of the capital of Pekanbaru. Airguns and "electronics" were recovered from the sites. They added that the attackers were members of the Islamic State of Indonesia, which affiliates with the Dumai branch of ISIL.

Chief of the Indonesian National Police Tito Karnavian stated that there were indications that the attack in Pekanbaru were linked with the Surabaya attacks, later added that the Pekanbaru attack might have been funded by the Surabaya cell.

== See also ==
- 2018 Mako Brimob standoff
