= 2018 Sukabumi landslide =

Landslide in Indonesia

- Date: 31 December 2018
- Location: Sirnaresmi, Sukabumi Regency, Indonesia; 6.819°S 106.452°E
- Deaths: 18
- Injuries: 3
- Missing: 15
- Property damage: 30 houses heavily damaged

On afternoon 31 December 2018, a landslide struck a settlement in the village of Sirnaresmi in Sukabumi Regency, Indonesia, striking 30 houses and killing at least 18 people. The settlement, populated by around 100 people, was located in a landslide-prone area.

== Location ==
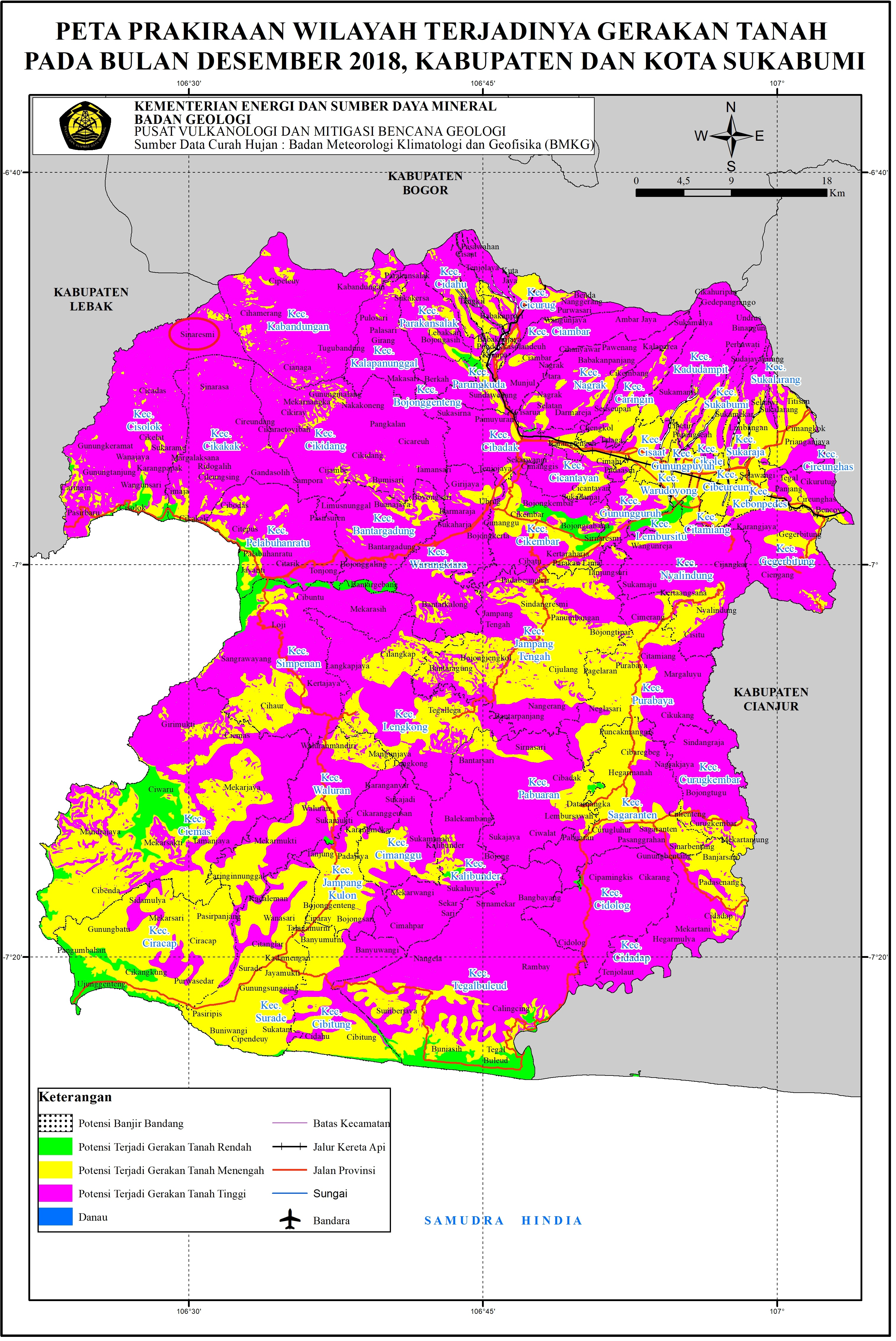
Landslide vulnerability for Sukabumi in December 2018. Sirnaresmi (circled red) is in the high-risk zone (pink).

The impacted areas were in Cigareohong kampung, Cimapag hamlet, Sirnaresmi village, Cisolok subdistrict, Sukabumi Regency, West Java. The settlement is located within the Mount Halimun Salak National Park, at the foot of a steep hill. Cisolok routinely experiences landslides, with one official remarking that landslides occurred there "every year since 2010". The already loose soil of the area was made more vulnerable by agricultural terracing and lack of strong vegetation roots.

Sirnaresmi, which is listed as a "cultural village", has settlements spread across altitudes ranging from 300 to 600 meters above sea level with hilly terrain and high inclination. The impacted area was populated by 107 people, living in 32 households.

== Landslide ==
Shortly before sunset on 31 December, around 5:30 p.m. local time, the landslide struck and buried 30 houses out of 32. Eyewitness accounts noted that at the time of the landslide, there was no rain, and some reported hearing a loud booming noise.

Following the main landslide, four smaller afterslides were recorded.

== Casualties ==
By 10 a.m. the following day, on New Years' Day, 5 dead bodies had been recovered, 3 had been confirmed injured, while 61 residents had been confirmed safe. By 3 January, 18 dead had been recovered with 15 missing. Some of the bodies were found buried under four meters of mud, with four additional survivors being found under the mud although one, an infant, died at hospital.

== Response ==
Indonesian National Board for Disaster Management (BNPB) spokesman Sutopo Purwo Nugroho noted that early search and rescue operations used manual equipment - with the hundreds of rescuers, locals, police, soldiers and volunteers, using their hands, shovels and hoes - due to poor road access to the affected areas, further strained by disaster tourists. Sutopo also said that across the country, 40.9 million people live in landslide-prone areas. A local military district commander gave a figure of 1,066 people involved in the evacuation. Evacuation procedures was briefly halted on 1 January due to inconsistent weather which was deemed too risky for SAR operations.

The Social Ministry provided Rp 15 million (around USD 1000) in aid for the families of all the fatalities. West Java governor Ridwan Kamil proposed to adopt two children orphaned by the landslide. Head of BNPB Willem Rampangilei - which was set to retire on 2 January - was requested by President Joko Widodo to visit the site, and his replacement's swearing in was delayed. The Indonesian government agreed to finance relocation of the affected victims to a less dangerous area.
