= John Tralala =

Indonesian artist and comedian

Yusran Effendi
- Born: 13 June 1959; Lampihong, North Hulu Sungai Regency (now part of Balangan Regency), Indonesia
- Died: 26 June 2018 (aged 59); Banjarmasin, Indonesia
- Years active: 1980–2018
- Known for: Artist, comedian

Yusran Effendi, also known by the stage name John Tralala, was an Indonesian artist and comedian. He was a recognized master of a Banjarese improvised comedy genre called Madihin. He performed on national stages for audiences which included Indonesian presidents Suharto and Susilo Bambang Yudhoyono.

== Career ==
Yusran was born on 13 June 1959, in town of Lampihong, then part of North Hulu Sungai Regency, which today is part of Balangan Regency, South Kalimantan, Indonesia. He was encouraged to take up the art of Madihin by his highschool friend, Yustan Azidin, who was later founder of South Kalimantan media BanjarmasinPost. In 1980, Yusran and three friends founded a comedy group named the John Tralala Group. They often performed on local radio, especially Nirwana Radio in Banjarmasin, and performed improvisations based on live readings of fan letters.

The group won national-level comedy competitions twice, in 1989 and 2001, on the state-owned television station TVRI. In the 1989 competition, one of the spectators was then-Indonesian president Suharto. Suharto was so impressed by his performance that he awarded Yusran a spot in an Islamic pilgrimage trip (which are normally given out by lottery). Yusran also became a close friend of Banjarese charismatic ulema Zaini Abdul Ghani. In total, he released 12 records of his Madihin performance and wrote a book about the genre, titled Syair Madihin.

After the end of the New Order period, he became host of Baturai Pantun, a regional television program on TVRI South Kalimantan. He continued to perform on national television as well. In 2013, he performed at the opening of the Banjarese Cultural Congress, in front of Indonesian president Susilo Bambang Yudhoyono. In 2014, he started a new career as film and theater director. During this time, he also started performing in national television programs such as those under SCTV. In the same year, he was invited by Indonesian Military to be a judge on Madihin competition for the 51st anniversary celebration of Kodam VI/Mulawarman's Regional Training Regiment.

In 2015, there were false reports in the news media that Yusran had died, but in fact it was fellow group member and friend Bung Kancil who had died. In 2018, Yusran endorsed an environmentalist campaign against mining activity in Kotabaru Regency. He expressed a desire to create a Madihin academy, however this was never realized.

He died of a heart attack on 26 June 2018, in Banjarmasin. After his death, a tribute performance dubbed "Collosal Madihin Performance" was held by many Indonesian artists in Banjarmasin Art and Culture Park, including by his own son who has taken on the stage name John Tralala Junior.

== Award ==
He was awarded "Grace of Art" (Indonesian: Anugerah Seni) by South Kalimantan government on 2016, as well as Astaprana Award (Indonesian: Anugerah Astaprana) from Sultan Khairul Saleh of Banjar Sultanate.
