= Jamaah Ansharut Daulah =

Terrorist organisation based in Indonesia

Jamaah Ansharut Daulah (JAD, Indonesian: جماعة انصار الدولة, lit. ''Helpers of the State Congregation'') was an Indonesian terrorist group that was reported to be linked to the 2018 Surabaya bombings as well as the 2019 Jolo Cathedral bombings. The Islamic State of Iraq and the Levant (ISIL) was reported as claiming responsibility for both attacks. The group had been identified by the United States Department of State as a terrorist organization in 2017. It was banned by Iraq and Indonesia. It was also listed as a terrorist organization by the United Nations Security Council on 4 March 2020.

== History ==
The history of the JAD is still unclear, due to the secretive nature of the group. However, several small portions of its history are known currently.

=== 2005: As part of Lamongan branch of the Islamic Defenders Front ===
Islamic Defenders Front (FPI), at its existence was renowned for having loose coordination despite its complexity of their structure and rank. Although the networks penetrate into district and sub-district levels, they are loosely coordinated, and often there are cases of fragmentation. Among many of its branches, there was a branch renowned for its extremism, FPI Lamongan branch (FPI Lamongan), which had a linked and strong relationship with Dr. Azahari and Noordin M. Top, both Malaysian terrorist kingpin.

Zainal Anshori, then National Leader of JAD, was head of FPI Lamongan of 2005–2008 period. He was appointed by Muhammad Rizieq Shihab himself to lead FPI Lamongan. Prior the appointment, he was renowned as Islamic activist that moved independently to commit sweepings with his group, against undesirables and un-Islamic elements. After that, FPI Lamongan actively committed sweepings. However, everything changed when the branch involved with Jamaah Islamiyah, and subsequent contact with Aman Abdurrahman [id], an Islamic militant, along with the deaths of Dr. Azahari and Noordin M. Top. Starting from there, FPI Lamongan shifted away to Islamic extremism. Affected with Islamic extremism ideology, FPI Lamongan used an extreme approach of imposing the Islamic doctrine of amr ma'ruf nahy munkar (enjoining good and forbidding wrong). They also often used excessive force. On 10 August 2008, Muhammad Rizieq Shihab personally warned FPI Lamongan, following a brutal attack against an alcohol seller during a sweeping. Due to its extreme way and acts, FPI Lamongan was disavowed by central leadership of FPI on request of East Java Regional FPI around 2010. Despite that, sympathizers remained, and in 2013 the sympathizers of the disavowed branch clashed with Lamongan locals.

In his confession made 9 February 2021, Zainal Anshori stated that the seed of what would become JAD had come into being during this period. The element that subsequently evolved into JAD was integrated during his leadership of FPI Lamongan on 2005. What happened to this element after FPI Lamongan being disavowed is unclear.

=== 2014–2018: Becoming JAD and active as organization ===
Aman Abdurrahman was recaptured by law enforcement for his involvement on training JAT terrorists in Jantho (Aceh) in 2010 and assisting escape of Dulmatin, one of the 2002 Bali bombings perpetrator with Azahari and Noordin. Soon after announcement of formation of ISIL by Abu Bakr Al-Baghdadi, he pledged his allegiance to him in June 2014 during his incarceration at Kembang Kuning Detention House, Nusakambangan Island. He later drafted a concept of organization that will support ISIS in Indonesia. Sometime later Zainal Anshori and Marwan visited him. In November 2014, JAD formed followed a majlis ta'lim in Batu. In that majlis ta'lim, Aman Abdurrahman become the Spiritual Leader of the group, Marwan become the National Emir, Zainal Anshori become the Emir of East Java, others have each specific posts established.

During its time as organization, JAD actively participated in various terrorism acts, notably 2016 Jakarta attacks, 2016 Samarinda church bombing, 2017 Jakarta bombings, 2018 Mako Brimob standoff, and 2018 Surabaya bombings.

=== 2018–2026: Actions after disbandment ===
On 21 June 2018, Joko Widodo signed Law No. 5 of 2018, as amendment of Law No. 15 of 2003 (Law on Anti-Terrorism Acts). The law granted much sweeping powers for law enforcement to capture terrorists and suspected terrorists. With the new law, even membership of announced terrorist organization enough to capture its member.

On 31 July 2018, a South Jakarta court made a ruling. The ruling, known as South Jakarta District Court Ruling No. 809/Pid.Sus/2018/PN JKT.SEL outlawed the organization, allowing the arrest of all its members and organizers.

Even after disbandment, JAD remains active clandestinely. After the disbandment, 2019 Medan suicide bombing, 2020 South Daha attack, and 2021 Makassar cathedral bombing happened. Aside the attacks, Two members of the JAD were believed to have conducted the knife assault on security minister Wiranto on 10 October 2019, which resulted in Wiranto being hospitalized. Three other people, including a policeman, were stabbed and injured.

It is still difficult to weed out JAD members, due to each cell of JAD are autonomous and do not have commanding figures and chain of command. Even each cell may not know each other. Due to being autonomous and have widespread presence across the country, the multiple attacks by JAD cells may happened in nearly same time, or even triggering domino effect which triggered with one act of one cell may happened.

On 7 December 2022, Astana Anyar bombing – at around 8:20 AM Western Indonesia Time (UTC+7), a suicide bombing incident occurred at an Indonesian National Police station in Astana Anyar district, Bandung, West Java. The attacker and one police officer were killed by the explosion, while 11 people were injured including 3 police officers.Identity of the perpetrator and his affiliation subsequently released by the Police 6 hours after the attack. Police General Listyo Sigit Prabowo, Chief of the Indonesian National Police, released that the perpetrator was affiliated to the JAD Bandung branch. Between 2023 till 2025, the group is inactive.

== Known elements ==
JAD is the name of an umbrella organization of at least 24 groups that pledged allegiance to the caliph of ISIL, but likely more than 24. These groups are:

1. Jamaah Tauhid wal-Jihad (Congregation of Oneness and Jihad).
2. Mujahidin Indonesia Timur (East Indonesia Mujahideen).
3. Mujahidin Indonesia Barat (West Indonesia Mujahideen).
4. Jamaah Ansharut Tauhid, Abu Bakar Ba'asyir Faction.
5. Bima Iskandar Group.
6. Darul Islam Banten Branch.
7. Hizb-ut Tahrir Indonesia Muhajirun Faction.
8. Jundullah Front.
9. Majmu’ah al-Arkhabiliy (Archipelagian Groups), also was known as Katibah Nusantara Lid Daulah Islamiyah. This group is not operated in Indonesia, but rather a JAD branch operated in Northern Syria regions and made up by Indonesian, Malaysian, and Filipino members.
10. Katibah Al - Iman.
11. Forum Pendukung Daulah Islamiyah (Daulah Islamiyah Supporter Forum).
12. Forum Aktivis Syariat Islam (Islamic Sharia Activists Forum), or FAKSI.
13. Gerakan Mahasiswa untuk Syariat Islam (Student Movement for Islamic Sharia), or Gema Salam.
14. Ring Banten (Banten Ring). This group is a Darul Islam splinter group and was a part of Jemaah Islamiyah network. It was the group where Imam Samudra trained himself in Islamic radicalism and Islamic extremism.
15. Pendukung dan Pembela Daulah (Supporters and Defenders of the Daulah), or PPD.
16. Gerakan Reformasi Islam (Islamic Reformation Movement).
17. Asybal Tauhid Indonesia.
18. Kongres Umat Islam Bekasi (Bekasi Congress of Islamic Umma).
19. Ikhwan Muwahid Indunisy (Brotherhood of the Monotheists Indonesia).
20. Jazirah Al-Mulk Ambon (Peninsular Land of Kingdoms Ambon).
21. Gerakan Ansharul Khilafah Jawa Timur (Saviors of Caliphate Movement East Java).
22. Halawi Makmun Group.
23. Gerakan Tauhid Lamongan (Lamongan Tawhid Movement).
24. Khilafatul Muslimin Indonesia (not to be confused with organization with the same name, Khilafatul Muslimin)
25. Umat Islam Nusantara (Nusantara Islamic Umma).

== Leadership structure ==
According to Dedy Tabrani (researcher from Indonesian Police College) and Aly Ashgor (researcher of Bhayangkara University), JAD leadership structure is as follows.

- Office of the Spiritual Leader of JAD
- Office of the National Emirate of JAD
- Office of the Secretary of JAD
- Office of the Treasurer of JAD
- Lajnah Tarbiyah (Education Institute, education and research wing of JAD)
  - Dauroh Manhaj (Ideological Training) Wing
  - Publishing Wing
- Division of Information and Information Technology
- Division of Public Relation
- Asykari Paramilitary Division (armed wing of JAD)
  - Paramilitary Training and Activities Wing
  - Financial Operations Wing
- Mas'ul (Regional Heads)
  - Mas'ul-ate of East Java
  - Mas'ul-ate of West Java
  - Mas'ul-ate of Central Java
  - Mas'ul-ate of Jabodetabek Area
  - Mas'ul-ate of Kalimantan (operated across Kalimantan Island)
  - Mas'ul-ate of Sulawesi (operated across Sulawesi Island)
  - Mas'ul-ate of Ambon (operated across Eastern Indonesia)

Smaller sub-Mas'ul-ates ("Branches") may present in each Mas'ul-ate, however their establishment much independent and instantaneous, not under JAD central leadership direction. Any group present in a city that become sub-Mas'ul-ate may pledge themselves as part of JAD. Despite that, coordination between JAD branches to their respective Mas'ul-ate existed to some degree.

== Key people ==
Several people have been identified as key members of JAD.

- Aman Abdurrahman: conceptor and spiritual leader, currently incarcerated.
- Marwan (nom de guerre: Abu Musa): national leader/Emir of JAD in 2014. Reported to go to Syria several weeks after becoming the Emir.
- Zainal Anshori: Emir of JAD East Java and subsequent national leader/Emir of JAD from 2014 until its disbandment. Currently incarcerated.
- Saiful Munthohir (nom de guerre: Abu Gar): Emir of JAD Ambon and head of Asykari Paramilitary Division, armed wing of JAD. Currently incarcerated.
