= Susan Kleebank =

German diplomat

Ambassador of Brazil to Slovakia
- In office 2012–2017

Personal details
- Born: 11 October 1961 (age 65) Porto Alegre, Rio Grande do Sul, Brazil
- Spouse: Evandro de Sampaio Didonet

Susan Kleebank (born 11 October 1961) is a Brazilian diplomat. From 2012 to 2017, she served as Brazil's ambassador to Slovakia. She is currently consul general of Brazil in Geneva.

== Biography ==
=== Personal life ===
Kleebank was born in Porto Alegre, Rio Grande do Sul, the daughter of Ruben and Miriam Kleebank. She is married to the Brazilian ambassador to Bern, Evandro de Sampaio Didonet.

=== Academic education ===
In 1980, Kleebank graduated in history from the Federal University of Rio Grande do Sul. In 1985, she completed a postgraduate degree in history from Paris Nanterre University.

=== Diplomatic career ===
Kleebank joined the Rio Branco Institute in 1981. After completing the course at the Diplomatic Academy, she was sworn in in 1982 as Third Secretary. She was initially assigned to the Division of Asia and Oceania I, where she worked from 1982 to 1984. In 1986, the year she was promoted to second secretary, she was removed to serve at the East Berlin Embassy, where she remained filled until 1987. Thereafter, she moved to Beijing, where she served as second secretary at the Brazilian Embassy in China from 1987 to 1990. From 1989 to 1992, she served at the Brazilian Embassy in Bonn. Also in 1992, she was promoted to first secretary.

On her return to Brasília, Kleebank initially held the position of advisor to the Department of International Organizations and, subsequently, advisor to the Alexandre de Gusmão Foundation. She remained in the role for nearly four years, then was removed to serve at the Brazilian Embassy in Rome.

She returned to Brazil in 1998, with a view to acting as an advisor to the Department of Asia and Oceania. In 1999, when she was promoted to counselor, she became head of the Legal Division of Itamaraty, a position held until 2001. She moved to Ottawa, where she held the position of counselor at the Embassy of Brazil in Ottawa. From 2003 to 2007, she was a counselor at the Embassy of Brazil in Washington. In 2004, she defended her thesis in the High Studies Course at Instituto Rio Branco, entitled "Judicial cooperation through diplomatic channels: evaluation and proposals for updating the regulatory framework", one of the requirements for functional advancement in Brazil's diplomatic career. In 2005, she was promoted to Minister of Second Class.

On her return to Brazil, Kleebank initially headed the General Coordination of Economic Organizations. In 2008, she became responsible for the Office of International Affairs of the Supreme Court. In 2009, she was promoted to Minister of First Class, the highest level in her Brazilian diplomatic career. In 2010, she was the Ceremonial and International Assessor of the Superior Electoral Court, a role held until 2012, when she was appointed Ambassador of Brazil to Slovakia. She remained in the role until 2017, when she was appointed head of the Consulate General in Geneva.
