= National Counter Terrorism Agency =

Indonesian government department

National Counter Terrorism Agency (BNPT)
- Badan Nasional Penanggulangan Terorisme
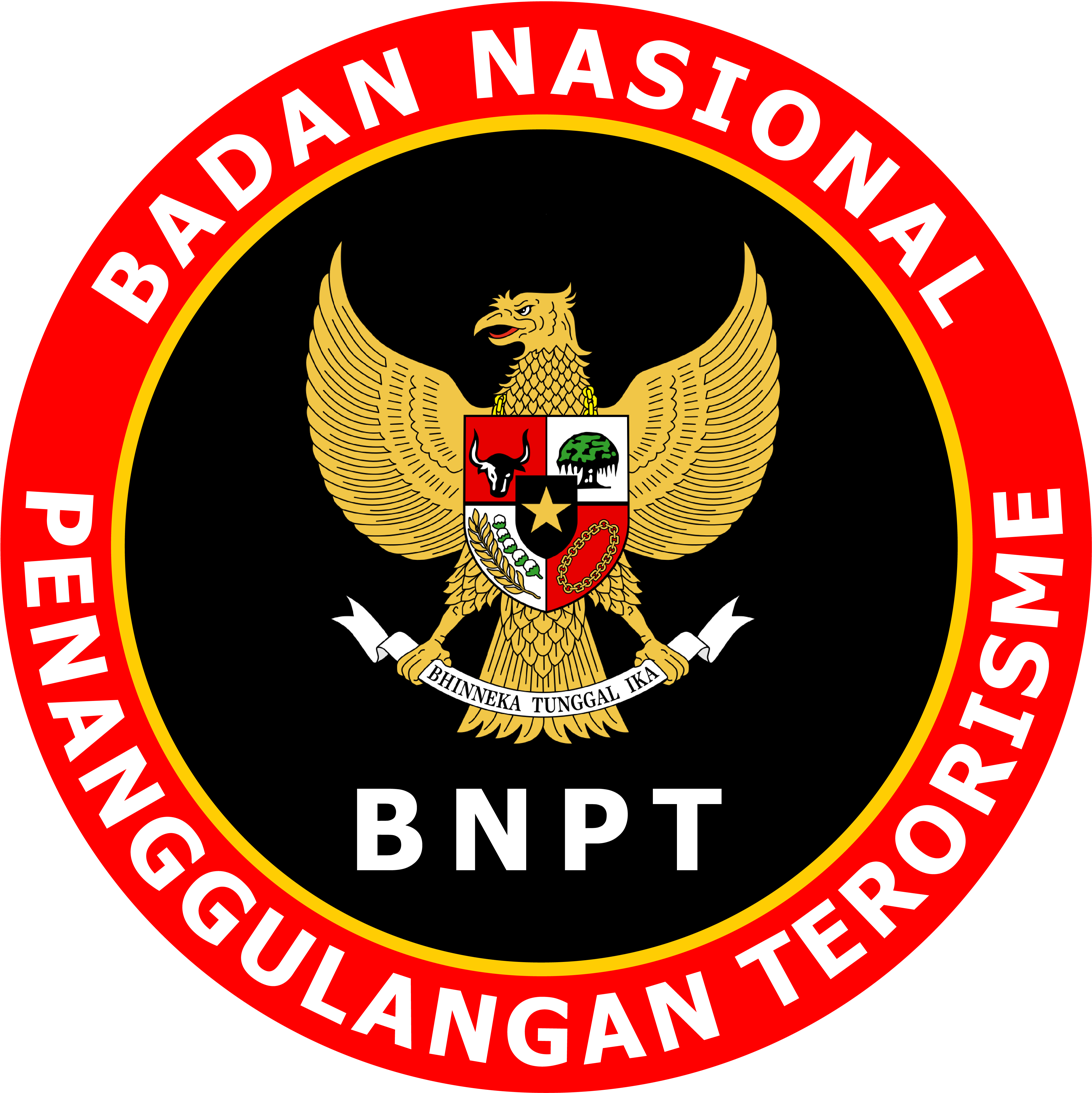

Agency overview
- Formed: 2010
- Preceding agency: Counter-Terrorism Coordination Desk
- Jurisdiction: Indonesia
- Agency executive: Pol. Com. Gen.Eddy Hartono, Chief
- Parent department: Coordinating Ministry for Political, Legal, and Security Affairs
- Website: bnpt.go.id

The National Counter Terrorism Agency (Indonesian: Badan Nasional Penanggulangan Terorisme, lit. 'National Agency for Counter Terrorism'; abbreviated as BNPT) is an Indonesian non-ministerial government department that works to prevent terrorism.

== History ==
BNPT was formed based on the 46th Presidential Regulation of 2010. The predecessor of this agency was Counter-Terrorism Coordinating Desk (Desk Koordinasi Pemberantasan Terorisme abbreviated as DKPT).

Its stated missions involve prevention terrorism and radicalism through efforts to work with government institutions and the community including prevention, protection, prosecution and de-radicalization of terrorism in Indonesia.

In 2015, Indonesia was taken out of the 'Non-Cooperative Countries or Territories' (NCCTs) list by the Financial Action Task Force (FATF).

Indonesia now has the same advantages and status as G20 countries.

The exit proves that BNPT is committed to preventing terrorism by combating financial crimes through the implementation of Law No.9/2013.

== Function ==
BNPT is responsible for:

- Formulating policies, strategies, and programs in the field of prevention terrorism;
- Coordinating the relevant government agencies in the implementation and implementing policies in the field of prevention terrorism;
- Implementing policies in the field of counter-terrorism by forming task forces composed of elements relevant government agencies in accordance with the duties, functions and authority of each. The field of prevention terrorism covering prevention, protection, de-radicalization, taking action, and the preparation of national preparedness.

== Management ==
The BNPT is headed by a chief, who is responsible to the President.

When it was first launched, the leader of BNPT held the ranking of a civil servant but the Presidential Regulation in 2012 elevated the post of BNPT Chief to the ministerial level.

== Organisation ==
BNPT's organizational structure consists of:

- Chief
- Expert Groups
- Main Secretariat
  - Bureau of Planning, Law, dan Public Relation
    - Division of Law, Public Relation, and Information Technology
      - Section of Legal Affairs and Bureaus Administration
      - Section of Information Technology
  - Bureau of General Affairs
    - Division of Administration, Protocols, and Security
    - Division of Household Affairs and Procurement
- Deputy of Prevention, Protection, and Deradicalization
  - Directorate of Prevention
    - Sub-directorate of Monitoring
      - Section of Network Monitoring
      - Section of Goods Monitoring
    - Sub-directorate of Counter Propaganda
      - Section of Source Collection
      - Section of Media Literation
    - Sub-directorate of Community Empowerment
      - Terror Prevention Coordinating Forum
  - Directorate of Protection
    - Sub-directorate of Vital Objects and Transportation Protection
      - Section of Vital Objects Protection
      - Section of Transportation Protection
    - Sub-directorate of Environment Protection
      - Section of General Public Environment Protection
      - Section of Government Environment Protection
    - Sub-directorate of Terror Victims Recovery
  - Directorate of Deradicalization
    - Sub-directorate of Guidance in Correctional Institution
      - Section of Prisoner Identification
    - Sub-directorate of Guidance for Public
      - Section of Public Identification of Former Prisoners, Former Terrorists, Their Family, and Their Networks
    - Sub-directorate of Guidance in Special Correctional Institution for Terrorists
- Deputy of Prosecution and Capacity Development
  - Directorate of Prosecution
    - Sub-directorate of Intelligence
      - Section of Intelligence Operations
      - Section of Intelligence Analysis
    - Sub-directorate of Technological Intelligence
    - Sub-directorate of Readiness and Crisis Management
      - Section of Readiness
      - Section of Crisis Management
  - Directorate of Capacity Development
    - Sub-directorate of Training
      - Section of Training Executors
    - Sub-directorate of Use of Power
      - Section of Power Concentration
      - Section of Power Empowerment
  - Directorate of Law Enforcement
    - Sub-directorate of Law Enforcement Apparatus Protection
      - Section of Litigation and Advocation
      - Section of Law Enforcement Apparatus Protection
    - Sub-directorate of Law Enforcement Inter-institutional Relation
- Deputy for International Cooperation
  - Directorate of Bilateral Cooperation
    - Sub-directorate of Asia-Pacific and Africa
    - Sub-directorate of America and Europe
  - Directorate of Regional and Multilateral Cooperation
    - Sub-directorate of Regional Cooperation
    - Sub-directorate of Multilateral Cooperation
  - Directorate of International Law Apparatuses
    - Sub-directorate for Protection Indonesian Citizens and National Interests in Foreign Lands
- Inspectorate
- Task Forces

== Chiefs ==
No.	Name	Years in position
1	Inspector General Ansyaad Mbai	2010–2014
2	Commissioner General Saud Usman Nasution	2014–2016
3	Commissioner General Tito Karnavian	2016
4	Commissioner General Suhardi Alius	2016–2020
5	Commissioner General Boy Rafli Amar	2020–2023
6	Commissioner General Rycko Amelza Dahniel	2023-incumbent

== Terrorism in Indonesia ==
=== Religious-based terrorism ===
Religious terrorism is the act of terrorism carried out with religion as the main motivation and goal.

Since the late 1960s, religious extremism has been especially prominent among the Muslim communities.

Social psychologist M. Brooke Rogers and others wrote that extremist religious fundamentalism can be closely linked to carrying out acts of violence and terror in the name of revenge or honor.

According to J. Dingley and M. Kirk-Smith, the act of sacrifice itself can act as a bridge between violence and religion.

Cultural, social, and religious background plays a crucial role in birthing religious terrorism, especially groups that stemmed out from specific geographical areas.

== Terrorist groups in Indonesia ==
=== Jemaah Islamiah (JI) ===
Jemaah Islamiah was established in 1993 by Abu Bakar Baasyir and have been linked to Al-Qaeda, the Taliban and the Abu Sayyaf group. Suspected group members hail from not just Indonesia, but neighboring countries such as Malaysia, Singapore, Philippines, and Thailand. JI was the group responsible behind the 2002 Bali bombings which resulted in 202 casualties.

In October 2002, JI was designated as a Foreign Terrorist Organization by the US Department of State.

=== Jemaah Ansharut Daulah (JAD) ===
Jemaah Ansharut Daulah is the terrorist group behind the 2018 Surabaya bombings and have admitted to be associated with Islamic State of Iraq and the Levant. JAD commonly recruits members from Australia and Southeast Asia. In 2017, the United States declared JAD as a terrorist group, thus prohibiting US citizens from getting involved with the group and JAD's assets in the US were frozen.

In July 2018, a court ruling provided legal justification for arrests of individuals associated with JAD through the establishment of Article 12A in the Terrorism Law.

=== Jemaah Ansharut Tauhid (JAT) ===
Jemaah Ansharut Tauhid was established in 2008 also by Abu Bakar Baasyir and have admitted to being associated with Al-Qaeda. JAT has conducted multiple attacks targeting civilians and Indonesian officials, even causing death upon several Indonesian police. They often carry out bank robberies and other illicit activities to fund their supply of weapons.

=== Darul Islam ===
Establish in the early 1940s, Darul Islam commonly used the term 'jihad' as the main reasoning behind their actions. Their ultimate goal is to establish an Islamic state in Indonesia.

== Incident that led to establishment ==
=== Bali bombings ===
On 12 October 2002, Imaam Samudara, Amrozi bin Nurhasyim and another terrorist from the Jemaah Islamiah terrorist group detonated two bombs in a popular nightclub along Kuta Beach in Bali and another in front of the United States Consulate in Denpasar.

The terrorists stated that their main goals was to kill as many Americans as possible as a form of revenge for "what Americans have done towards Muslims" as they regarded the war on terrorism as a form of religious discrimination.

Amrozi has said that he regrets that he killed too many Australians instead of Americans, while in prison.

== Involvements ==
=== Jakarta attacks ===
Multiple explosions and gun related attacks in Jakarta in January 2016 resulted in 8 casualties and 24 serious injuries.

The attack carried out by Islamic State of Iraq and the Levant (ISIL) near Sarinah Mall in Central Jakarta.

One of the bombings was carried out in a Starbucks store close to the United Nations building which hosted multiple foreigners and expats, two of whom have been killed.

=== Surabaya bombings ===
Before the Ramadhan season of 2018, a series of suicide bombings were carried out in multiple churches around Surabaya.

The bombings were said to be the brainchild of Islamic State-inspired Jemaah Ansharut Daulah (JAD), or Jamaah Ansharut Tauhid (JAT) groups, according to National Police chief, General Tito Karnavian.

Indonesian President Joko Widodo strongly condemned the attacks and described it as an "act of cowards".

=== University of Riau, Sumatra Island ===
Three university students in the University of Riau were caught with homemade explosives and had planned to carry out an attack on the local parliament of Pekanbaru, the capital of Riau.

The weapons and explosives they held were seized after BNPT carried out a raid in the university.

One of the suspects was identified as being part of a local terrorist group called Jemaah Ansharut Daulah (JAD), which was the group behind the 2018 Surabaya Bombings.

== Safety measures and efforts ==
=== University involvements ===
The increase in Islamic radicalism among young adults, especially those in university has been concerning.

After the arrest of the three individuals from the University of Riau incident, a total of 122 universities across Indonesia have joined forces with BNPT to aid in combating terrorism stemmed from religious extremism.

=== De-radicalization program ===
There are over 600 convicted criminals and terrorists who have been through the de-radicalization program that is carried out by BNPT.

The leader of BNPT, Suhardi Alius, believes it is a successful effort as only 3 criminals out of the approximate 600 have gotten involved with terrorism after completing the program.

== Anti-terrorism laws ==
After the 2002 Bali bombings, the Indonesian government was quick to implement new counter-terrorism laws and amend existing laws.

=== Law No. 5/2002 ===
This law concerns the act of money laundering and covers 10 chapters plus 46 articles. The Chapters consists of:

1. General Provisions
2. The Crime of Money Laundering
3. Other Criminal Acts related to the Crime of Money Laundering
4. Reporting
5. Centre for Financial Transactions Reporting and Analysis
6. Investigation, Prosecution and Examination before the Courts
7. Protection of Reporting Parties and Witnesses
8. International Cooperation
9. Transitional Provisions
10. Closing Provisions

=== Law No. 15/2003 ===
This law grants BNPT and other government organizations the permission to detain anyone they deem as a suspect for up to 6 months without a trail, using intelligence reports as evidence and intercept phone calls which they deem would allow them to gain access to information crucial to solving and preventing terrorism cases.

=== Law No. 17/2011 ===
This law concerns State Intelligence and their role to intercept and conduct surveillance on any kind of communication that they deem may potentially threaten national security.

=== Law No. 9/2013 ===
A stark improvement from Law No 15 of 2003 which only contained a brief idea of preventing terrorism-related transactions. The newer law was created right after the Bali bombings to fill in existing gaps in the criminalization of terrorism funding. More specifically, the law allows the government in freezing and seizing assets of suspected terrorists.

== Criticism ==
=== Al-Chaidar ===
Terrorism observer, Al-Chaidar believes the de-radicalization program is not effective and is strongly against the fact that these criminals are then released to the community.

He is sure that they will get involved in terrorism acts again and that stricter laws and punishments should be imposed.

=== John Sidel ===
In John Sidel's book "The Islamist Threat in Southeast Asia: A Reassessment", he states that he does not believe strong security approaches will have any effect on preventing terrorism.

In fact, he is sure serious actions can potentially be more counterproductive towards efforts on terrorism prevention.

=== Human Rights Watch ===
After the Eradication of Criminal Acts of Terrorism Law (the "CT Law") was passed on May 25, 2018, Brad Adams from the Human Rights Watch wrote an open letter to President Joko Widodo and Speaker Bambang Soesatyo stating the cons of the CT Law ranging on the fact that it depended on a far-reaching definition of terrorism, to a broader imposition of the death penalty, and the violation of basic human rights.

=== Bilveer Singh ===
Bilveer Singh, an Associate Professor of Political Science at Nanyang Technological University of Singapore, concurs that the anti-terrorism laws in Indonesia are still weak despite efforts to improve them after the events in 2002 and 2009. In his paper, he proposes various measures to aid Indonesia's battle with terrorism.

== See also ==
- Terrorism In Indonesia
- Ministry of Home Affairs
- Ministry of Defense
- Indonesian National Armed Forces
- Detachment 88
- List of terrorist incidents in Indonesia
