= 2018 Mako Brimob standoff =

Prison riot in Depok, Indonesia

2018 Mako Brimob Standoff
- 2018 Mako Brimob standoff (Depok) 2018 Mako Brimob standoff (Indonesia) Attack site shown on a map of Indonesia
- Location: 6°21′03.5″S 106°50′56.0″E; Depok, West Java, Indonesia
- Date: 8–10 May 2018
- Attack type: Prison riot, stabbing
- Deaths: 8 (6 police officers, 1 inmate, 1 other militant)
- Injuries: 4
- Perpetrator: Convicted terrorism inmates
- No. of participants: 155 perpetrators
- Defenders: Detachment 88; BRIMOB; Kopassus

A three-day prison takeover and stand-off took place in 2018 between the Indonesian National Police and inmates convicted of terrorist activities who were imprisoned at the Police's Mobile Brigade Corps's headquarters (Mako Brimob) in Depok, West Java, Indonesia. The inmates took control over one prison block and 6 police officers were taken hostages. As a result of the standoff, five police officers died, with one inmate dead after being shot by the police. Four policemen were also injured in the incident. The Islamic State claimed its fighters were in the standoff. Another policeman was stabbed to death at the headquarters of the elite Mobile Brigade police after the siege by a terrorist who was later shot and killed.

== Chronology ==
=== 8 May ===
- Events began at 7:20 p.m, when an inmate complained that food brought by a family member was late. An IS leader, Wawan, incited the inmates to attack saying "the warden is a dog." By 8:20 p.m., inmates broke out of the holding blocks and attacked the investigation building, overpowering the officers inside. Of the 13 officers inside, seven escaped with injuries, but six officers were captured. Five were killed and one held as a hostage.
- At 9:15 p.m., negotiations with police began, with police demanding the release of the hostages, unaware that five had already been killed. Police offered to treat two injured inmates and threatened to attack unless an agreement was made, but their offer was refused.
- At 12:00pm, National Police spokesperson Brig. Gen. M. Iqbal confirmed the news, saying that the police were still handling the situation.

After midnight, pictures began circulating on social media, depicting several detainees holding firearms, a black IS flag, nursing wounds and holding hostages. Mako Brimob and surrounding areas were secured and civilians were prohibited from coming closer to the area. Brimob officers began to secure the surrounding streets, extending extra security to a nearby church and hospital.

=== 9 May ===
- At 1:30 a.m, inmate representative Abu Umar asked for permission to leave the Detention Center and meet with Aman Abdurrahman. Abu Umar’s request to meet the IS leader was conveyed to senior police officials who met with Abu Umar and were informed of the fate of their colleagues.
- At 8:15 a.m., the inmate representative asked again to meet with Aman Abdurrahman to hear his judgement and reach a solution regarding medical treatment for two inmates.
- At 12:00am, the five bodies of the police were retrieved.
- At 3:35 p.m., police pressured the perpetrators to release the hostage by issuing a warning and agreeing to treat the wounded terrorists.
- At 8:15 p.m., the inmates asked to meet again to convey their wish to meet Aman Abdurrahman and hear his fatwa. The representative of the inmates promised to release the hostage but feared that once the hostage was released “all of the inmates would be under attack.”
- At 10:30 p.m., Densus 88 issued warning of an imminent attack on the prisoners. The representative of the inmates asked to meet with officers and told them they would release the hostage after speaking to Aman Abdurrahman.
- At 11:15, the police hostage Iwan was released and brought to the hospital, after the prisoners request was granted.

=== 10 May ===
- At 1:30 a.m., police warned they would “attack within a short period of time.”
- At 2:40 a.m., the inmates’ representative asked to meet again to convey intention to surrender.
- At 5:30 a.m., the inmates’ representative asked for a meeting to convey the technicalities of the weapons handover.
- At 6:45 a.m., the detainees left the Detention Centre and surrendered. Weapons numbering 26 units and about 300 rounds of ammunition were handed over.
- Hours after the end of the siege, a suspected Islamic militant fatally stabbed a police officer at the headquarters of the elite Mobile Brigade police in Depok. The assailant used a hidden knife to stab an officer who was asking him about why he was near the headquarters.

== Victims ==
The police have announced that five members of Police's Densus 88 counter-terrorism unit have been killed while another officer was held hostage, in a standoff between police and terror convicts since rioting broke out on Tuesday evening at the Mobile Brigade headquarters (Mako Brimob) detention center in Kelapa Dua, Depok, West Java.

One terror detainee was also killed during the incident after making repeated threats and attempting to steal a police weapon.

The Mako Brimob has been in lockdown since rioting broke out at its detention center on Tuesday evening, with local roads cordoned off and affecting traffic on Wednesday.

According to National Police spokesman Brig. Gen. M. Iqbal, the officers' bodies have been transferred to the National Police Hospital in Kramat Jati, East Jakarta.

The bodies have been identified as:

- First Insp. Yudi Rospuji Siswato
- Adj. Second Insp. Denny Setiadi
- Brig. Fandy Setyo Nugroho
- First Brig. Syukron Fadhli
- First Brig. Wahyu Catur Pamungkas

Meanwhile, the police officer who was held hostage was identified as Chief Brigadier Iwan Sarjana.

== Responses ==
Netizens were worried about Jakarta's former governor Basuki Tjahaja Purnama who was serving sentence in Mako Brimob for a politically motivated conviction of blasphemy against Islam. Although the police reported him to be safe, they suspected that the attackers planned to attack him as well.

== In popular culture ==
- Sayap Sayap Patah (2022), depicts the event.
