= Sanggau Ledo riots =

1997 ethnic violence in Indonesia

- Part of New Order era
- Location of the regency (kabupaten) within the province of West Kalimantan on the island of Borneo.
- Location: Bengkayang Regency, West Kalimantan, Indonesia
- Date: December 1996 – February 1997
- Deaths: 465–1,600 Madurese; 38–100 Dayaks

The Sanggau Ledo riots, also known as the Sanggau Ledo incident, were ethnic riots occurring between December 1996 and February 1997 involving the Dayak and Madurese ethnic groups in West Kalimantan, Indonesia. The conflict started in Sanggau Ledo and eventually spread throughout most of the current Bengkayang Regency (Note: At the time, Bengkayang Regency was part of Sambas Regency.) and some surrounding areas, with the large majority of the violence targeting the Madurese.

The conflict was sparked from a brawl in December 1996, after which two Dayak men were stabbed in Ledo. Provoked by false rumors that the Dayak men had been killed by the Madurese and that the perpetrators had escaped, Dayak mobs attacked and burned several Madurese settlements in and around Sanggau Ledo. Over the following week, an estimated twenty Madurese people were killed and thousands were displaced.

After a pause in the fighting, the riots were ignited again at the end of January when a Dayak mob killed a Madurese man. Two days later, Madurese mobs killed a Dayak man and severely injured two women. Dayak fighters retaliated with widespread anti-Madurese violence, hunting and slaughtering Madurese civilians, in what many scholars have referred to as an instance of ethnic cleansing.

By the time the conflict subsided in late February, hundreds of Madurese had been killed and almost the entire Madurese population was expelled from the conflict areas, resulting in tens of thousands of refugees. Dozens of Dayak people were also killed, mostly by the Indonesian military. At the time, it was the worst communal violence in Indonesia in decades and the worst conflict between the Dayaks and Madurese to ever occur.

== Background ==
=== Ethnic groups ===
The Dayak people are indigenous to West Kalimantan. The Madurese people first began to migrate to West Kalimantan in the 1800s, although did not begin to arrive in significant numbers until the 1920s. The initial migrants were mostly brought as indentured laborers, often unpaid, in a system anthropologist Muhammad Adib called a "covert slave trade".

After the ethnic cleansing of the Chinese inhabitants by Dayak mobs in 1967, Madurese migration to the area increased, as many began to move into the abandoned lands. Development investment under the New Order government also attracted many Madurese migrants in the following decades.

By 1997, Dayaks made up 41 to 43 percent of the population in West Kalimantan, while Madurese made up just 3 to 5.5 percent. The vast majority of Madurese in the conflict areas by this time period were native to West Kalimantan, with a survey by political scientist Jamie Davidson finding 97% had been born there.

=== Previous Dayak-Madurese clashes ===
The first significant clash between the Dayak and Madurese in West Kalimantan did not occur until late 1967, in the immediate aftermath of the ethnic cleansing of the Chinese. The first conflict started as a fight over properties that the former Chinese inhabitants were forced to abandon. The Madurese were also accused of defending the Chinese and were slurred as "black Chinese". Several more Dayak-Madurese clashes occurred in the following decades, although reliable information on them is lacking. The worst clashes occurred in 1979 and 1983. None of the previous conflicts likely surpassed 20 to 30 deaths, although some estimates are higher.

While the scale of violence was much smaller than during the Sanggau Ledo riots, the previous clashes did have a large negative effect on Madurese and Dayak relations. Compilation lists and stories of the previous clashes spread person-to-person among the Dayaks, with the Madurese being blamed for all of them. Dayaks widely believed that these incidents were never properly resolved.

== Prelude ==
The initial event began in the town of Ledo on 6 December 1996, at a campaign concert organized by the ruling party, Golkar, for the May 1997 Indonesian legislative election. Two youths began interacting with a Dayak girl. The exact nature of the interaction is disputed, with Dayak accounts claiming she was being harassed or, in one story, abducted, while Madurese accounts say there was nothing untoward. Most accounts say that the youths were bothering the girl. A Dayak man intervened, telling the youths to leave her alone, but they ignored him. The Dayak man then hit them, resulting in a brawl and the youths being beaten.

The beaten youths returned several times with their friends, looking for the Dayak men who assaulted them. On the night of 29 to 30 December, they found the Dayak men at another concert in Ledo district and one of the youths attacked them with a celurit, a sickle-shaped knife commonly used by the Madurese. The Dayaks fled to a nearby clinic. The injuries were mild, and they were released from the clinic that evening. Nevertheless, rumors quickly spread that the two Dayaks had been killed.

Although widely believed to be Madurese, the youth who stabbed the two Dayaks was half Dayak and half Madurese. However, he lived in a Madurese area and reportedly identified more with his Madurese side. A Kompas journalist's investigation suggested some of the other youths with him were not Madurese either.

== Events ==
=== First stage ===
On the morning of 30 December 1996, a crowd of Dayaks numbering over 100 people assembled at the police station in Ledo. Believing the rumor that the Dayaks who were stabbed had died, they demanded that the "killers" be punished. They gave the police a noon deadline to make the arrests, threatening violent retribution if the police did not heed their demands. The police did not tell the mob that they had already arrested the suspects that morning out of fear that the police station would be attacked and the suspects would be lynched. Madurese leaders also made public apologies to the victims, but this did not calm the crowd.

Believing one of the perpetrators of the stabbings lived in Sanggau Ledo, the crowd began a 20-kilometer walk to the town. The Sanggau Ledo police were warned of their approach and began to evacuate the Madurese to a nearby air force base. The mob had about 400 people when they arrived, and more continued to trickle in. They demanded to see the Madurese leaders in the area, but the police refused their demand, fearing for the safety of the leaders. The mob became more agitated and began calling for the expulsion of the Madurese from the area. Later that day, the mob attacked and burned Madurese settlements around Sanggau Ledo. One Madurese person was injured in the attack.

The size of the mob was estimated at around 2,000 people by the next morning. Most of the remaining Madurese houses in Sanggau Ledo were burned, with the Madurese who refused to evacuate earlier fleeing into the jungle. The same day, a Dayak mob attacked a village in Bengkayang district. The Madurese fled to a military compound, and the mob pursued, leading to the military firing warning shots at the ground, with a few members of the mob getting injured as a result. A rumor spread that several had been killed, leading to angry mobs attacking several other villages.

The violence continued for several days, with the size of the Dayak mobs eventually reaching around 5,000 people. Some Madurese retaliated by burning Dayak houses in Pontianak and Singkawang, where Dayaks were a minority, leading to hundreds of Dayaks fleeing. At least two houses were burned and one Dayak person was injured in the attack in Singkawang. Some Malay homes were also burned by the Dayak mobs in Tujuh Belas. The large majority of the violence was targeted at the Madurese.

The violence mostly ended on 6 January, when there were no more Madurese homes to burn in the main conflict areas. Around 6,000 Madurese were displaced, with most fleeing to Singkawang. Over 1,000 homes were burned. The official death toll was 5, with 21 missing, but unofficial estimates were much higher. A delegation of Islamic scholars counted 18 dead, while other estimates were as high as 50. Most scholars put the number around 20, with all of the victims being Madurese.

=== Pause in the fighting ===
A few days after the fighting mostly ceased, a peace agreement was signed between Madurese and Dayak leaders. Peace ceremonies were held from 5 January to 8 January. Leaflets were also dropped by military aircraft in the conflict areas saying that everything was "under control". Many Madurese began to return to their villages, although some who returned said that their homes were still being burned and that Madurese civilians were still being hunted.

On 6 January, a large group of Madurese went to the provincial government and formally requested help for the Madurese refugees, prosecution for those who committed the violence, and preventative measures to be instituted so that the violence would not repeat. The only arrests made were of five people allegedly involved in the original stabbings on 30 December; no Dayaks had been arrested for the mass-violence since then. No further arrests were made.

Small-scale arson attacks continued throughout January, but the situation remained mostly peaceful until 28 January, when a Dayak mob attacked a village near Siantan, Pontianak, killing one Madurese man, injuring several others, and burning down a surau. A false rumor also spread that a Madurese religious leader had been killed by Dayaks. That evening, some Madurese leaders held a meeting in Pontianak. One present was the leader of a surau that had been burned. They decided to retaliate against the largest Dayak advocacy organization in West Kalimantan, the Pancur Kasih Social Foundation, choosing their complex in Siantan, where some of the Madurese victims of the village attack had relatives.

Late into the night of 29-30 January, a mob consisting of dozens of Madurese attacked the complex. Several buildings were damaged and two women were severely injured in the attack. Rumors quickly spread that they had been killed, although both survived. Three Dayak houses were also burned by some Madurese in Mempawah city on 29 January, allegedly led by relatives of the Madurese man killed the previous day. On the 30th, some Madurese also set up roadblocks in Peniraman, south of Pontianak, killing at least one Dayak. This series of attacks and the rumors about them led to the second stage of the conflict, which Human Rights Watch described as "all-out war".

=== Second stage ===
Starting on 30 January, the "red bowl" (mangkok merah) began to be passed around Dayak villages. The bowl, which uses chicken blood, symbolizes a call to war; any village that receives the bowl is required to send warriors to fight.

The first major attack took place on 31 January, in Pahauman. At least 148 Madurese villagers were killed when Dayak fighters attacked the village. Many were herded into a warehouse where they were burned alive. One estimate suggested that as many as 200 were killed in the massacre.

The Madurese retaliated later on the 31st, killing four more Dayak people at the Peniraman roadblock. Two of the Madurese allegedly involved in the killings had lost family members in Pahauman. One of the Dayaks murdered was Martinus Nyangkot, a village leader in Tebas and a prominent Dayak adat leader who had previously forbidden violence against the Madurese in his village. He had been returning from his daughter's graduation ceremony in Pontianak. Five Dayaks were also killed when they tried to storm an army post where 300 Madurese were sheltering.

The next day, Dayak mobs responded with roadblocks and attacks in Mempawah and Ngabang. Dayak fighters also launched a large-scale attack on Salatiga, Landak. The military had offered to evacuate the village, but the village leaders refused, instead opting to defend the village, arming locals with machetes and knives. They were quickly routed when Dayak fighters equipped with rifles arrived. A local Dayak pointed the fighters to the Madurese homes, and families who did not flee in time to the jungle were slaughtered. At least 131 Madurese were killed with some estimates in the hundreds. A Madurese mob in Singkawang reportedly burned four houses and killed one Dayak person the same day.

On 2 February, the deputy regent of Sanggau Regency led a Dayak convoy with hundreds of fighters to Balai Karangan, near the Malaysian border. The fighters killed and decapitated twelve Madurese, including children. Malaysia closed its border in response, saying it would be reopened once the situation was safe. The same day, eleven Dayak fighters were killed by the military when they tried to get to a Madurese area near Singkawang.

The next day, the convoy that attacked Balai Karangan went south to Tayan, killing at least another 54 Madurese, although some estimates are in the hundreds. Another Dayak convoy consisting of 300 fighters was shot at when trying to break through a military base to attack a group of Madurese refugees as well, leading to 5 of the fighters being killed.

Large numbers of military reinforcements began to arrive on 5 February. Feisal Tanjung, Chief General of Indonesia's armed forces, told journalists that there was "no problem" in West Kalimantan. A spokesman for the army told journalists that "everything is now secure and under control", but denied that any additional troops were sent to the area.

The deadliest incident during the conflict for the Dayak people occurred the same day, in Anjungan, when a convoy of fighters tried to get past a military checkpoint. They were attempting to reach a Madurese village, Galang, Mempawah. The military shot at the tires of the trucks, causing them to flip over, and then fired upon the occupants. The number killed is disputed, though most estimates put the number killed close to 20.

=== Deescalation ===
Smaller attacks continued throughout the next two weeks, but press access was strictly limited, making the reports less reliable. On 15 February, Madurese and Dayak leaders began writing a peace agreement, which was finalized and signed on 18 February. A peace ceremony was also held on 18 February in Pontianak, involving Madurese and Dayak leaders, government officials, and the military. Nevertheless, small clashes continued to occur.

The largest clash in this period was on the day of the agreement, when Dayak fighters attacked Sungai Kunyit, north of Pontianak. Around 107 houses were burned and 1,000 people were displaced. At least 20 Madurese people were killed in the attack. The military arrested 86 people in response and said that the Dayak leaders in some of the interior regions had not heard about the peace agreement.

The last significant clash took place on 22 February, when Dayak fighters burned 60 Madurese houses in Mandor, Bengkayang, north of Pontianak. On 27 February, a peace ceremony was held with Dayak and Madurese leaders. Dayak fighters ended their road checkpoints shortly after. The military kept 3,000 troops on site while waiting for the peace agreement to be finalized. The final peace agreement was signed at a peace ceremony in Pontianak on 15 March by Madurese and Dayak leaders, along with the local military chief and the West Kalimantan governor, Aspar Aswin. Thousands of people attended the ceremony.

== Response by authorities ==
=== Military and police response ===
The military and police were widely criticized for not doing enough to prevent or stop the violence. Responses almost only occurred when mobs attempted to storm military bases. Soldiers said they were not authorized to shoot at the fighters. Madurese survivors also said they were ordered by the military not to respond as they watched their homes burn.

One explanation put forward for the inadequate response was the lack of police and military resources. West Kalimantan had one of the lowest ratios of police to civilians in the world at the time, possibly due to security forces moving to Jakarta as the Suharto government faced increasing tensions. There were fewer than 800 police officers and 1,200 military personnel for the entire province. The police were also underfunded and underpaid, often working multiple jobs. The army lacked supplies of anti-riot gear like tear gas and rubber bullets.

Other scholars have said that the resources were misused. Gerry van Klinken argued that the security forces effectively aided in the expulsion of the Madurese by putting most of their resources into evacuation rather than prevention. There were also reports of extrajudicial executions of Dayaks who were surrendering or were already arrested.

=== Arrests and charges ===
By the end of the conflict, 184 people were charged with crimes, and 8 people were charged with murder. Human rights groups argued that cases were mostly never brought to trial, and those who committed murders went mostly unpunished.

Many of the leaders and participants were widely known, but they were never arrested. The head of the Indonesian National Commission on Human Rights said that they would not perform an investigation, arguing that it would only serve to provoke further conflict.

Most arrests that did occur were under a 1951 law banning the possession of sharp weapons. Human Rights Watch argued that this allowed the government to arrest almost anyone that they wanted to, because most males in West Kalimantan carry sharp objects and almost every family owns sharp weapons. Hundreds of arrests were reported for this offense.

=== Censorship ===
The Indonesian government was widely accused of covering up the events. Under the New Order government, writing about ethnicity was tightly restricted, as was writing anything considered "sensational". Any reporting on ethnic issues was required to follow the government's position.

Journalists said they were pressured not to report on the events during the conflict. Lieutenant General Syarwan Hamid held a closed meeting with Indonesian media senior editors and warned them against "overexposure" of incidents. Newspapers were ordered not to include pictures or describe the level of brutality and tapes were seized by the military. Nobody was allowed to enter or leave the conflict zones, and journalists were blocked from entering hospitals and refugee camps. This resulted in few reliable reports on the conflict and, according to BBC News, the events were "almost unreported" in Indonesia.

Journalists trying to cover the event were also sometimes detained. Zainuddin Isman, an ethnically Dayak journalist for Kompas, was taken in for questioning after publishing one of the few chronologies of the events, widely seen as pro-Madurese. The police searched his car without a warrant and found a knife, leading to his detainment and later house arrest for over six months. He was found not guilty at the trial.

Western journalists were also blocked from the conflict areas and ordered to stay in Pontianak for "their own safety". The government sent a letter to Japanese journalists warning them to be "more careful in covering the recent situation", and included a report accusing the Japanese Communist Party of spreading the bad stories.

The Bureau of Democracy, Human Rights, and Labor at the U.S. State Department criticized the Indonesian government for tightly restricting reporting during the riots. Human Rights Watch argued that the media restrictions "exacerbated the conflict" by allowing rumors to spread.

== Causes ==
Academics have put forward several factors that increased tensions between the Madurese and Dayak communities. Three of the major factors often mentioned are economic, political, and cultural. The transmigration program has also often been blamed for contributing to the conflict.

=== Economic ===
One popular explanation for the conflict is that economic marginalization contributed to the tensions. The Madurese worked in many of the same lower-level jobs, frustrating many Dayaks. One government official said that due to poor education in the interior regions, the Dayaks had been unable to compete with the Madurese. In these regions, where many Dayak fighters came from, only 16% of the population had a higher than elementary school education. Taufiq Tanasaldy argues that Madurese education levels were similarly low.

Some scholars argued there was a degree of jealousy over the relative economic success of the Madurese. Both the Madurese and Dayaks were mostly economically disadvantaged. However, the Madurese were moderately economically better off, particularly in the communities hit with the most violence.

Other scholars disagree that economic marginalization played a major role. Jamie S. Davidson argued that the role of marginalization does not explain why the conflict happened in West Kalimantan, but not East or South Kalimantan, where Dayaks were also marginalized.

=== Cultural differences ===
One cultural issue voiced by many Dayaks was the Madurese habit of carrying a celurit, a sickle-shaped knife traditionally used to cut grass for their cattle. Many Dayaks argued that this violated the Dayak custom of not showing a blade. The majority of Dayak men also carried sharp objects. They tended to view their sharp objects as tools, while viewing the Madurese celurits as weapons. Many Madurese saw their celurits as tools too, not a threat of violence. Most Dayak families also had traditional weapons in their homes.

Living in segregated communities and exclusivity has also been considered by many as a background factor. Sociologist Nancy Lee Peluso argued that while there is no hard evidence, there is "considerable anecdotal evidence" that many Madurese did live in segregated communities. Some scholars disagree, arguing that Madurese usually lived in mixed communities and that their degree of exclusiveness was no greater than other ethnic groups. Most Madurese also denied any exclusivity, arguing that intermarriage rates were high and that many Madurese couldn't speak Madurese anymore. According to scholar Taufiq Tanasaldy, some survey data suggested that intermarriage rates were quite low. Many Dayaks also complained that the Madurese did not participate in Dayak festivities; anthropologist Anika König speculated that this may be because the Madurese, who are overwhelmingly Muslim, did not want to consume haram food or drink.

Dayaks also widely held negative stereotypes of the Madurese as violent and criminal. The majority of Dayaks blamed such characteristics of the Madurese as causing the conflict. Many viewed violent and criminal acts as an ethnic issue, rather than an individual one. Madurese people who they knew personally they often saw as exceptions, with the vast majority saying their own Madurese neighbors had been friendly and did not meet these stereotypes. In one survey, only 16% of Dayaks said they had personally seen any negative behavior from any Madurese. They instead relied on stories of various incidents to justify their belief in the stereotypes. Many of the Dayak fighters were also from the interior regions and had little contact with the Madurese.

Some scholars view the negative stereotypes themselves as contributing to the conflict. The Madurese were treated as a dangerous "Other" in Dayak society. Many Dayak families would scare their children with stories of the Madurese abducting children and sacrificing them, instilling hatred from childhood. In one survey, 86% of Dayak respondents said they believed the Madurese were "evil-doers".

The need to carry out obligations under Dayak traditional law, adat, has been one of the main reasons put forward by Dayak people and organizations for the conflict. Many Dayak felt the Madurese were not respecting their traditional law and that this was an inevitable response. The Madurese tended to view instances of violent crimes as an individual issue that should be handled by police, while Dayaks wanted it solved by adat. The Institute of Dayakology Research and Development, a Dayak activist organization, argued that to not fight the Madurese would have brought "great misfortune" upon the entire Dayak community and called the killings necessary for this reason.

The Dayak community leader in Bengkayang, Suherman Acap, said that adat was manipulated to justify the conflict, and that the rules were "revised" or even invented to mobilize fighters. Some Madurese leaders said Madurese customs were also manipulated, with the concept of "carok" (revenge with a celurit) being used to justify taking vengeance against the Dayak community, when traditionally it was only supposed to be used against the perpetrator of the offense.

The significance of drawing blood has also been put forward as an explanation for the escalation to conflict. The Madurese often used their celurits over major disputes, while the Dayaks often used fists and viewed the drawing of blood as justification for communal violence.

Jamie S. Davidson argued that the role of culture in general is overstated and lacks an explanation for why only the Madurese were targeted with such extreme violence, when other ethnic groups have also been involved in violence against Dayak people and have also disrespected Dayak culture. He also argued that the role of culture does not explain why Madurese and Dayak people lived peacefully together for many decades, both before 1967 and in other areas of Kalimantan to the current day.

=== Politics and identity ===
Many scholars see identity as playing an important role in the conflict. Political scientist Jamie Davidson argued that other explanations tend to focus on why Madurese-Dayak violence existed, but fail to explain why the riots in 1997 were so extensive. Previous riots were small in scale and localized, while in the 1997 riots, Dayaks often fought alongside other Dayaks who they did not know and who spoke different languages.

Although Dayak identity dates back to near the end of Dutch rule, marginalization from the inception of the New Order helped create a sense of a "shared experience". The loss of Dayak political power in particular has widely been seen as a factor in the conflict. Dayaks lost most political positions when the new government came to power and had little success in politics in the succeeding decades, having only once held a regent position during the entirety of the period.

Major Dayak NGOs began to form in the 1980s. Using newspapers, funding of cultural events, and other means of spreading information, these organizations promoted a sense of shared identity and struggle among Dayaks. Pancur Kasih became the most influential of these groups, and retrieved significant foreign funding from groups such as the Ford Foundation. Some of Pancur Kasih's sub-organizations, including the Institute of Dayakology Research and Development (now Institute Dayakology) and the newspaper Kalimantan Review, backed protests and promoted an ideology stressing Dayak victimhood and the need to mobilize. They also departed from earlier Dayak activist movements through a focus on "liberation" from what they saw as domination from non-indigenous outsiders. Davidson argues that these NGOs spread this ideology at a time when the state would not address their concerns, leaving violence as the only option.

In 1994, West Kalimantan began adding locals to administrative positions as part of a move toward decentralization. After a Dayak was passed over for the head of Sintang Regency, riots broke out, leading to a Dayak being picked for the head of Kapuas Hulu Regency the next year. Taufiq Tanasaldy argues that this success of violent ethnic politics helped "set the stage for a more severe conflict in 1996-1997".

Although the conflict was likely not sparked from political motivations, once the conflict began, Dayak organizations utilized it to push for political advances. The outcome of the conflict was seen as highly politically effective. Dayaks gained the regent positions for both Sanggau Regency and Pontianak Regency in 1998, with Dayak leaders using the threat of further violence to get the district assemblies to pick Dayaks. By 1999, Dayaks had control of four of the seven regencies in West Kalimantan.

=== Migration and development ===
The transmigration program, which brought migrants to West Kalimantan with government assistance from more densely populated regions, has often been blamed for the conflict. When interviewed, many Dayaks and other locals agreed that this was a contributing factor. The transmigration program hit a peak in 1996 and 1997, with over 350,000 migrants planned to be moved to Kalimantan in just 1997, 3.5% of the total population of Kalimantan at the time.

Many scholars dispute that this was a significant factor. The Madurese rarely came through transmigration programs. Both survey data and settlement patterns showed the vast majority of Madurese being spontaneous migrants, with one survey of four hundred Madurese finding none came through transmigration. Transmigration sites were also mostly far from the conflict zones, and West Kalimantan did not become an official transmigration site until 1973, after the first clashes between the Madurese and Dayak communities. Tania Li said that another "deficiency" with the argument is that the Javanese, who, unlike the Madurese, mostly did come through transmigration, were not targeted with violence.

The Minister of Transmigration, Siswono Yudo Husodo, denied that transmigration was a factor in the riots and said the government transmigration policy would not be altered. Siswono argued that only seven transmigration settlements were attacked during the riots, all by Dayak fighters from outside the areas, while the local Dayaks tried to protect the settlements.

Spontaneous migration rates were high before the conflict. Sanggau Ledo had more migrants than other areas, with 15% of the population being migrants in 1980, versus just 1.4% in West Kalimantan as a whole. The number was likely higher by 1996.

Much of the scholarly analysis also considers land takeover by the state to be a major factor. Dayak land was often considered state land due to it not being officially registered or being considered vacant, and used for commercial purposes and for migrants. The Madurese were seen as benefiting from these policies, or even collaborating.

Scholars have varying views on the role of development projects. Jamie S. Davidson argued that land grants did not appear to have any connection with the Dayak-Madurese clashes, based on the timing and locations of the grants. Timo Kivimäki said that the areas of conflict were the ones most at risk for upcoming development projects. These projects also frequently hired large numbers of Madurese migrants, making them a visible symbol of their grievances. Gerry van Klinken argued that the areas of conflict did not have a high degree of land expropriation compared to other parts of Kalimantan, and that it may have been a factor for the first stage of the conflict, but probably not the second stage, which showed more signs of organization by Dayak leaders.

== Analysis ==
=== Ethnic cleansing ===
By the end of the conflict, practically the entire Madurese population of the current Bengkayang Regency was killed or expelled. The Madurese population in the Samalantan district fell from at least 8,091 before the conflict to 13 in the 2000 census. In the Sanggau Ledo district, the Madurese population fell from at least 3,102 to 19.

Dayak leaders often called for the expulsion of the Madurese. One Dayak leader, Ve Kader, said that the Dayak people would not be content until all of the Madurese were dead or removed from Kalimantan, also saying, "We are not going to rest until we have driven them all out of our rightful homeland." Many scholars have referred to these expulsions and massacres as an instance of ethnic cleansing.

Timo Kivimäki has called the conflict an instance of ethnic cleansing and argued that the attacks were "systematic". Traditional leaders mobilized fighters using rituals, and the fighters were put under the command of these authorities.

Gustav Brown also considered the conflict to be a case of ethnic cleansing. He argued that the attacks showed clear signs of being financed and coordinated, and were likely pre-planned. Members of the official adat councils and from some Dayak NGOs assisted in communication, intelligence, and transportation for the fighters. The fighters also had rifles smuggled from Malaysia. Brown said that, by contrast, the Madurese showed few signs of having any coordination or logistics.

Other scholars have argued that the attacks were not organized. In Anomie and Violence: Non-truth and Reconciliation in Indonesian Peacebuilding, John Braithwaite, Valerie Braithwaite, Michael Cookson, and Leah Dunn said that the conflict was "more in the nature of Dayak rioting that got out of control" as opposed to the organized violence in the Sambas riots two years later. They also referred to the conflict as a case of "ethnic cleansing" and said that Dayak fighters engaged in "purging Madurese communities". John Bamba, one of the heads of the Institute Dayakology, argued that the conflict did not entail ethnic cleansing at all, rather that the killings were necessary to "fulfill the obligations and demands of adat", the Dayak customary law.

Some scholars have argued that only the second stage of the riots showed conclusive signs of organized mobilization and killings. A paper produced by the Crisis Prevention and Recovery Unit of the United Nations Development Programme, the Department of Sociology at the University of Indonesia, and the Ministry of National Development Planning concluded that the first stage was "relatively spontaneous", while during the second stage "recruitment and attacks [were] organised". Gerry van Klinken said that the government-established Dayak adat councils operated command posts during the second stage of the conflict, helping with intelligence and coordination.

=== Supernatural elements ===
The majority in practically all groups in West Kalimantan, regardless of education level or ethnicity, believed in supernatural incidents during the riots. Stories about these supernatural occurrences are frequently included in popular tellings of the riots. At The Sydney Morning Herald, Louise Williams called the conflict a "war" of "magic and superstitions".

Among the most common beliefs were Dayak invulnerability and calling on ancestral spirits for help. The spirits were often believed to grant this invulnerability. When Dayaks were killed, most believed it was because they hadn't participated in the rituals properly. The spirits were often also believed to possess fighters and put them into a trance, where they would no longer be in conscious control of their own bodies.

Timo Kivimäki has argued that these supernatural beliefs had major effects on the conflict. The belief in invulnerability bypassed the usual fear-factor in preventing people from entering into combat and the "trance" had the effect of making the Dayak fighters arguably not responsible for any atrocities they committed. The head of the Directorate of Village Development in West Kalimantan also said it would be difficult to prosecute the fighters because of the trance.

Another popular belief was that the Dayak fighters could "smell" the Madurese. Dayak mobs would stop buses and cars and smell the occupants, beheading whoever they deemed to be Madurese.

=== Cannibalism and decapitations ===
Both cannibalism and decapitations were confirmed by Dayak and Madurese eyewitnesses. Although it is widely agreed that many Dayak fighters participated in cannibalism, Timo Kivimäki says it has become "taboo" to talk about it in Dayak communities, being seen as a "shameful and primitive" practice.

Many Dayaks considered these practices to be a return to their traditional methods of war, despite neither being practiced by all Dayak groups historically. They argued that it helped them win the conflict, both due to causing fear in the Madurese and due to their belief it provided supernatural abilities. War rituals often required beheading their victims, drinking their blood, and eating parts of their bodies. Some scholars said that the beheadings were very different than the traditional headhunting practice. Taufiq Tanasaldy argued that it was used to dehumanize the victims.

=== Rumors ===
Rumors played a significant role in mobilizing fighters during the conflict. The joint statement issued at the March peace agreement blamed rumors for provoking the riots. Republika reported that misinformation was also blamed in the initial peace ceremony in January.

Lists of Madurese leaders who were allegedly plotting raids against Dayaks were widely circulated before the conflict. An alleged Madurese "masterplan" also circulated and was widely believed, which proposed "seducing Dayak girls" and destroying the strength of the Dayaks.

Baharuddin Lopa, the secretary-general of the National Commission on Human Rights, said that young people were particularly susceptible to falling for misinformation and that the leaders in the area had failed to correct the record. Gerry van Klinken has argued that in areas where reliable information is scarce, people are more reliant on what their leaders say. All three of the initial claims from Dayak leaders about the events in the Ledo stabbings turned out to be untrue; the Dayak victims had not died, the perpetrator was not fully Madurese, and the police had arrested the perpetrators.

== Aftermath ==
At the time, the Sanggau Ledo riots were the worst communal conflict in Indonesia in decades. The riots claimed more lives than all of the earlier conflicts between the Madurese and Dayaks combined. They were also the first of the riots to garner significant international attention.

=== Fatalities ===
Death toll estimates for Sanggau Ledo riots
Deaths	Author(s)	Year
500 (Note: Including at least 38 Dayak deaths and 465 Madurese deaths. Of the 38 Dayak deaths, 33 were by the military. In 2001, Human Rights Watch estimated the number of deaths at over 600, without giving a breakdown or further details.)	Human Rights Watch (Note: Using counts in each village affected based on families that lost members.)	1997
1700 (Note: Including around 1600 Madurese deaths and 100 Dayak deaths.)	Djueng (Note: Stephanus Djueng was head of the Institute of Dayakology Research and Development, a Dayak activist organization.)	1997
1700	UNDP, Bappenas, and PSPK-UGM	2007
1006	Varshney, et al. (Note: Using the UNSFIR conflict database and cross-checking with local news reports and by conducting interviews with residents.)	2008
600 (Note: Only including Madurese deaths.)	Harsono, et al. (Note: In the "Seruan Pontianak" (Pontianak Appeal), an article signed by 77 specialists in West Kalimantan issues.)	2009
666	Sukandar, et al. (Note: Using data from the National Violence Monitoring System and only counting deaths from January to early February 1997.)	2015

Official numbers on the death toll are lacking and contradictory. In the first official comment on the death toll, on 12 February, after a newspaper report said that 2,000 people had been killed in the riots, a military spokesperson responded that "only a couple of hundred people" had been killed. Later the same day, the official walked back the comment, insisting that the real number was just "dozens". On 17 February, Major-General Zacky Anwar Makarim told Media Indonesia that 300 people had been killed in the riots. Raden Hartono, the Chief of Staff of the Indonesian Army, denied this, saying that fewer had been killed, although he did not give a number.

Unofficial estimates vary widely, from around 500 to 3,000 deaths. Journalists reported finding evidence of massacres in the jungle, where Dayak fighters had been hunting for hiding Madurese, making exact counts difficult.

The overwhelming majority of the victims were Madurese. Most Dayak deaths occurred at army roadblocks, with one estimate suggesting over 125 Dayaks had been killed by the military in these incidents.

In Anomie and Violence: Non-truth and Reconciliation in Indonesian Peacebuilding, John Braithwaite, Valerie Braithwaite, Michael Cookson, and Leah Dunn said that the Human Rights Watch number of around 500 deaths was "the most credibly conservative" estimate of the death toll. Most estimates of the death toll range from this number to around 1,700, although some academics find estimates in the thousands as possible. Timo Kivimäki put the range at around one to three thousand, citing an investigation by Christian church leaders in the area that estimated a few thousand deaths along with a report by the United Nations Development Programme, the Ministry of National Development Planning, and Gadjah Mada University's Centre for Rural and Regional Development Studies that estimated 1,700 deaths.

=== Refugees ===
Estimates for the number of displaced after the conflict usually range from 20 to 25 thousand, although a report from the United Nations Development Programme, the Ministry of National Development Planning, and Centre for Rural and Regional Development Studies at Gadjah Mada University put the number at over 25,000. Many Madurese left Kalimantan, and others moved in with family members, making an exact count difficult. The Madurese constituted the vast majority of the displaced. During the conflict, some reports suggested around 5,000 Dayak people were displaced as well, fleeing both Madurese mobs and Dayak fighters from outside their areas.

The refugee crisis continued for years after the conflict. Transmigration Minister Siswono Yudo Husodo said in April 1997 that there were still over 20,000 Madurese in refugee camps. By late May, the number dropped to 5,000, with the government building shelters to reduce the number. Few were able to safely return to their homes in much of the conflict areas. Journalists who visited the area months after the riots were told by Dayak fighters armed with swords that, had they been Madurese, they would have been killed. The Sambas riots two years later affected many of the same areas, further preventing many Madurese from returning home, and resulting in a second expulsion for the Madurese who had returned. More than five years after the conflict, thousands of refugees were still displaced and had not received any funds to help with their resettlement. In more recent years, many Madurese have been able to return to Bengkayang safely.

Many Madurese lands were occupied in their absence without any compensation. In some cases, the Madurese were allowed to sell their land, although not lease, but were required to pay a fee to the people occupying their land first. The head of Sanggau Ledo called this compensation for "maintenance of the lands".

=== Further massacres ===
In early 1999, riots broke out between the Madurese and Malays in Sambas Regency. After a Dayak man from Samalantan was killed by unidentified perpetrators, the Madurese were widely blamed. Dayak mobs immediately joined the Malay in attacking the Madurese, targeting the same areas as during the 1997 riots.

Hundreds of Madurese were again killed in the riots, and tens of thousands were displaced. Many of the victims were previous refugees from the 1997 riots.

Tapol described the Sambas riots as a worse "replay" of the 1997 riots, with many observers saying they may have inspired the later riots. Together, they led to the almost complete elimination of the Madurese from Sambas Regency, in what academics widely consider a case of ethnic cleansing.

== See also ==
- Cannibalism in Asia § Sumatra and Borneo
- Fall of Suharto
- Sambas riots
- Sampit conflict
- Tarakan riot
