= Samalantan =

District in Indonesia

- District
- Location within West Kalimantan Location within Kalimantan Location within Indonesia
- Coordinates: 0°47′41.57207″N 109°11′40.48415″E
- Country: Indonesia
- Province: West Kalimantan
- Regency: Bengkayang
- District seat: Samalantan

Area
  - Total: 234.69 km^{2} (90.61 sq mi)

Population (2025 estimate)
  - Total: 23,700
  - Density: 101/km^{2} (262/sq mi)
- Regional code: 61.07.02

Samalantan is a district in Bengkayang Regency, West Kalimantan, Indonesia. As of 2025, the population is estimated at 23,700 people. It has a total area of 234.69 km^{2}. The district capital is Samalantan.

The district is bordered by Sungai Betung to the east, Monterado to the west, Landak Regency to the south, and Lembah Bawang to the north.

== History ==
Samalantan was originally called Phak Miong Theo, and was dominated by Chinese inhabitants. Following the ethnic cleansing of the Chinese by the Indonesian military and Dayak mobs, the village was renamed to Samalantan, from Sama'antant, meaning grass in the Dayak Kendayan language.

=== Ethnic riots ===
In 1967, the former West Kalimantan governor, Oevaang Oeray, held a meeting in Samalantan with Dayak leaders where he called on them to expel the ethnic Chinese from the area. Despite being replaced as governor by the New Order government a year earlier, Oeray still had significant influence in Dayak communities.

After the Chinese residents were expelled, many of their abandoned properties were occupied by Madurese migrants, leading to renewed ethnic tensions. The first significant clash in Samalantan between the Madurese and Dayaks occurred in 1977, after a Dayak police officer was killed in Pontianak by a Madurese man. Dozens of houses were burned and several people were killed.

In 1979, major riots occurred between the Dayak and Madurese in Samalantan again after a Dayak man was killed in Sendoreng. (Note: Sendoreng is now part of Monterado district, but at the time was part of Samalantan.) One story says a small group of Madurese killed the Dayak man after a disagreement over a debt; another says it was over a grass-cutting dispute. Dayak locals in Samalantan and Monterado spread the "red bowl" to mobilize fighters in surrounding areas. The fighting raged over a period of a few days, until the military intervened and ended the conflict. Most estimates put the fatalities at around 20, with around 50 to 100 houses burned, although some estimates are much higher. Most of the victims were Madurese. A peace monument was built in Samalantan in the aftermath of the conflict.

Another Madurese-Dayak clash in Samalantan occurred in 1997, during the Sanggau Ledo riots. After the riots began in Sanggau Ledo, the head of Samalantan district held a meeting with Dayak and Madurese leaders. The Madurese agreed to disarm in exchange for security guarantees. Shortly after, a Dayak mob, mostly from within the district, attacked Madurese areas, burning around 765 houses. After a pause in the fighting, Madurese groups retaliated, burning down a few houses and killing one Dayak man. The "red bowl" began to be passed in Samalantan in response, leading to renewed mass-violence. The peace monument from the 1979 conflict was also destroyed during the 1997 riots.

In 1999, renewed clashes occurred during the Sambas riots. Originally between Malays and Madurese, the riots spread to Samalantan district after a Dayak man from Samalantan was killed. The perpetrators were unknown, but the Madurese were widely blamed. The Samalantan district chief said that, based on the witness statement, the actual perpetrators were Dayak, but that "no one wants to hear this". Within an hour of the victim's body being returned, Madurese homes in Jirak hamlet, Samalantan village, were already being burned. Soon, Madurese homes throughout the district were burned. Many Madurese fled into the jungle, where they were hunted, and potentially hundreds in Samalantan were killed. The 1997 and 1999 riots led to the almost complete elimination of the Madurese from the district.

== Demographics ==
=== Religion ===
In 2020, there were 4,401 Muslims, 10,965 Protestants, and 8,279 Catholics in the district. There were also 46 people professing other beliefs, mostly Buddhism. As of 2024, the district has 15 mosques, a musalla, 52 Protestant churches, and 12 Catholic churches. It has one of the highest number of Protestant churches of any district in Bengkayang Regency. It was also reported to have six Chinese temples in 2020.

=== Ethnicity ===
Madurese made up a significant part of the population before the 1997 Sanggau Ledo riots and 1999 Sambas riots, with over 8,091 Madurese people in the district. Another estimate by Mohammad Adib at Airlangga University put the number at 18,059. In the 2000 census, of the remaining 38,457 residents, around 71% were Dayak and 14% were Malay. Only 13 Madurese people remained in the district. In 2019, around 3% of the population were Madurese, while Dayaks made up around 43%.

== Administrative divisions ==
Samalantan District consists of seven villages (desa). All of the villages are considered rural.

Name of desa	Area in km^{2}	Pop'n estimate 2024
Babane	27.90	2,426
Bukit Serayan	33.49	2,670
Marunsu	25.68	3,098
Pastijaya	33.49	4,746
Sabau	47.99	2,506
Samalantan	38.23	6,350
Tumiang	27.90	2,627
Totals	234.69	24,423

In 1979, the Indonesian government passed a law standardizing village sizes. This resulted in 37 villages in Samalantan having to be merged into other villages, leaving the district with 15 villages. In 2001, five of Samalantan's fifteen villages were transferred to form Monterado district. In 2006, three of its remaining ten villages were split off to form Lembah Bawang district, leaving the district with its current seven villages.
