= Reform era in Indonesia =

Contemporary period of Indonesian history (1998–present)

Reform era
- 21 May 1998 – present
New Order
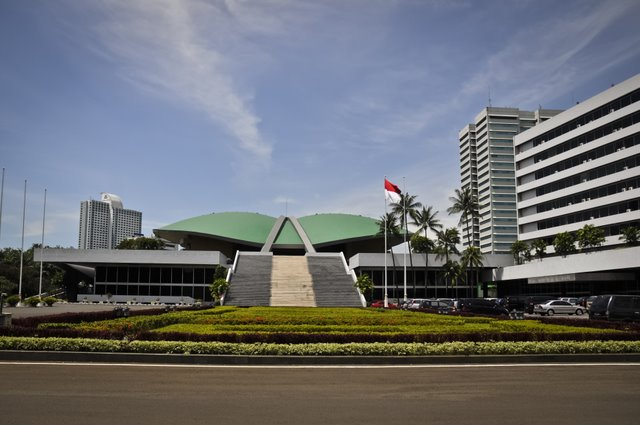
- Parliamentary Complex of Indonesia, 2012
- Key events: Resignation of Suharto; 1998 Indonesian coup d'état attempt; Poso riots; Maluku sectarian conflict; 1999 East Timorese crisis; East Timor independence; 1999 presidential election; Sampit conflict; Impeachment of Wahid; 2002 Bali bombings; 2004 presidential election; 2004 Indian Ocean earthquake and tsunami; 2005 Bali bombings; 2008 financial crisis; 2015 Southeast Asian haze; 2016–17 Jakarta protests; 2018 Asian Games; May 2019 Jakarta protests and riots; 2019 Papua protests; 2019 Indonesian protests; COVID-19 pandemic; Omnibus law protest; Local election law protests; Dark Indonesia protests; Cyclone Senyar

The Reform era (Indonesian: Era Reformasi, lit. 'Reformation era'), also referred to as the Post-Suharto era (Indonesian: Era pasca-Suharto), is the contemporary period of Indonesian history which began with the downfall of President Suharto and his New Order regime on 21 May 1998. Since then, the country has been in a period of transition. This period has been characterised by a more open political-social environment and grassroots economic improvement.

Issues over this period have included a push for a stronger democracy and civilian rule, elements of the military trying to retain their influence, a growing Islamism in politics and society, and demands for greater regional autonomy. The process of reformasi has resulted in a higher degree of freedom of speech, in contrast to the pervasive censorship under the New Order. This has led to a more open political debate in the news media and increased expression in the arts. Events that have shaped Indonesia in this period include the independence of East Timor, a bombing campaign by Islamic terrorists (including the 2002 Bali bombings), the 2004 Indian Ocean earthquake, religious and political tensions from 2016 to 2019, the COVID-19 pandemic and Cyclone Senyar.

== Fall of Suharto (1998) ==
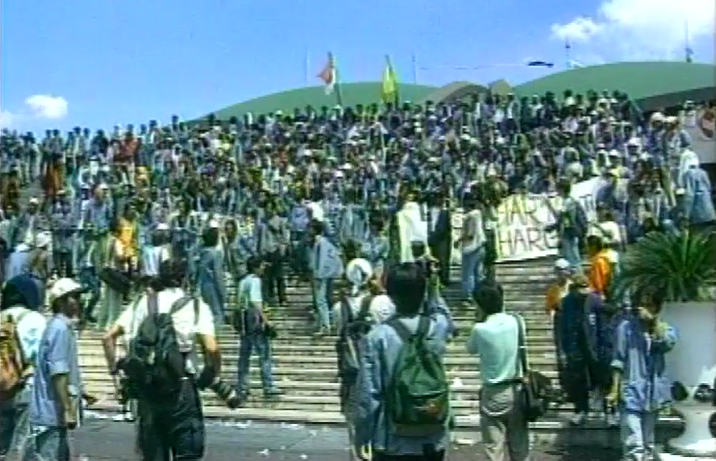
Students occupying the parliament building in 1998

The Reformasi of 1998 led to changes in Indonesia's various governmental institutions, including the structures of the judiciary, legislature, and executive office. Generally, the fall of Suharto in 1998 is traced from events starting in 1996, when forces opposed to the New Order began to rally around Megawati Sukarnoputri, head of the PDI and daughter of the founding president Sukarno. When Suharto attempted to have Megawati removed as head of this party in a back-room deal, student activists loyal to Megawati occupied the headquarters of PDI in Jakarta. This culminated in the 27 July 1996 incident, when the military broke up the demonstrations.

These actions, along with increasing concerns over human rights violations in Indonesian-occupied East Timor, began to unsettle Suharto's usually friendly relations with Western countries such as Australia, the United Kingdom, and the United States. These further worsened when the 1997 Asian financial crisis hit Indonesia, highlighting the corruption of the New Order.

In West Kalimantan, there was communal violence between the Dayaks and the Madurese in the 1996-1997 Sanggau Ledo riots and in the 1999 Sambas riots. In the Sambas riots, both Malays and Dayaks massacred the Madurese. In 2001, the Sampit conflict broke out in Central Kalimantan, resulting in large scale massacres of the Madurese by Dayaks.

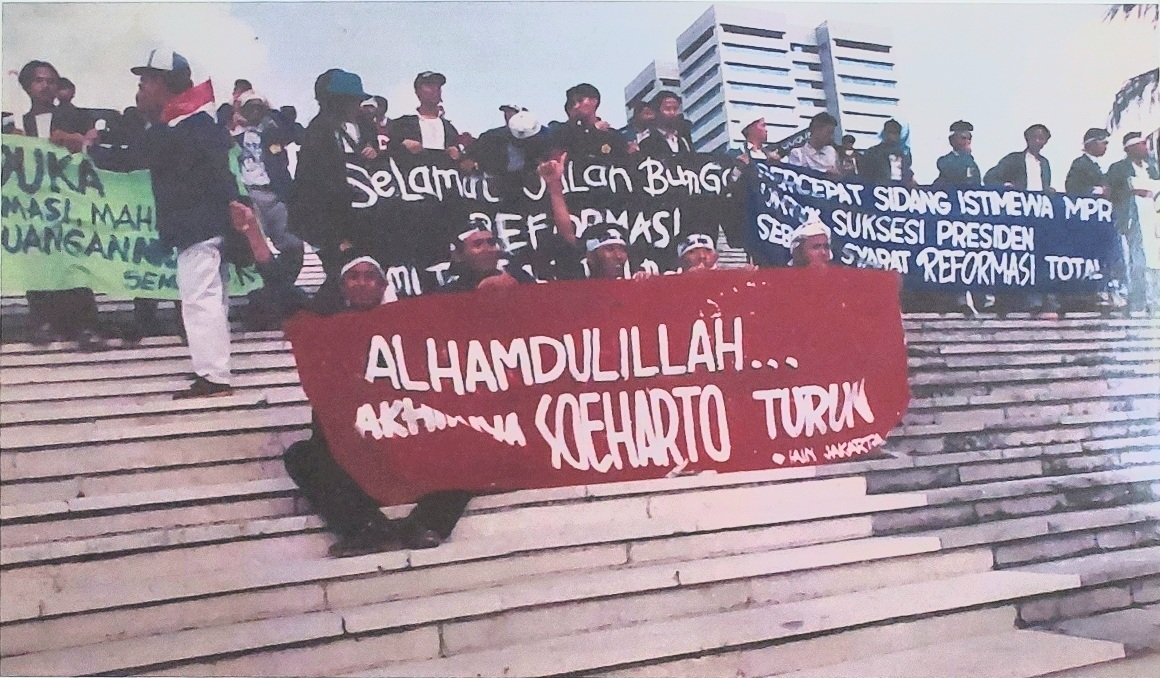
Students celebrating the fall of Suharto on the steps of the parliament building, May 1998

Growing dissatisfaction with Suharto's authoritarian rule and the rapid erosion of the economy led many, chiefly the younger generation, to renew their protests directly against the New Order. During the 1997–1998 period (mainly on 13–15 May 1998), a massive riot broke out in Indonesia. People were burning everything within the city, including cars, motorcycles, buildings, and monuments in addition to pillaging and looting from stores.

== Presidency of Habibie (1998–1999) ==
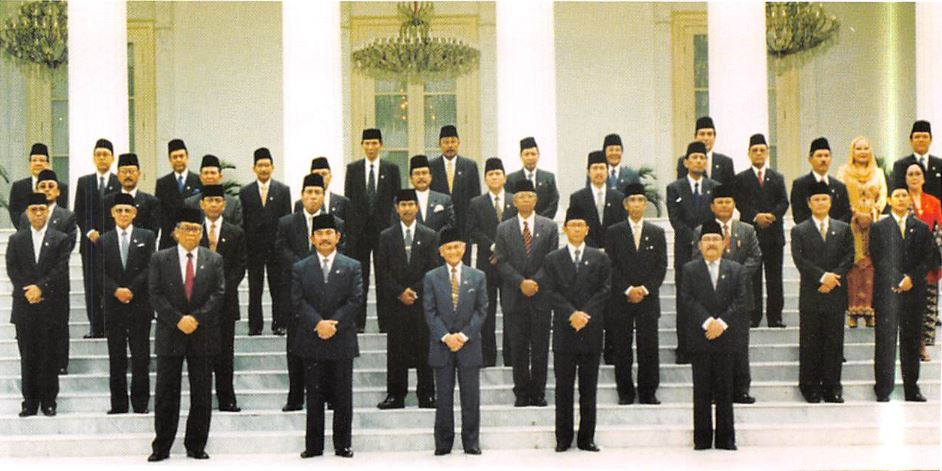
B.J. Habibie's Development Reform Cabinet, 23 May 1998

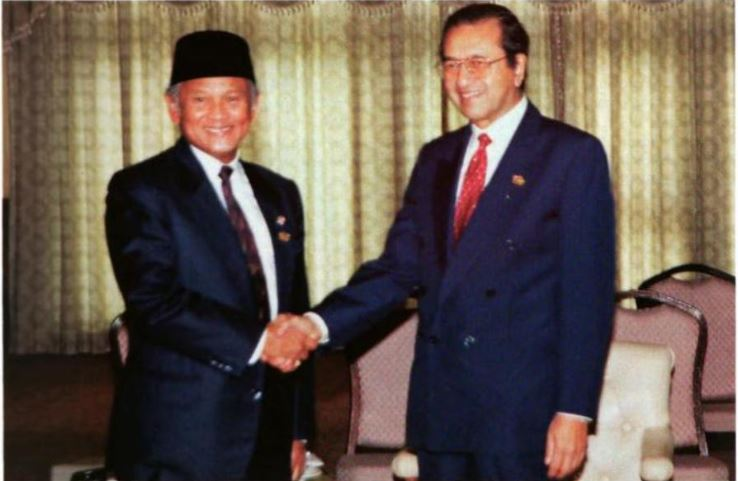
Habibie meeting with Malaysian Prime Minister Mahathir Mohamad

After Suharto's resignation, Vice President B. J. Habibie was sworn in as president and undertook numerous political reforms.

In February 1999, the Habibie administration passed the Political Parties Law, under which political parties would not be limited to just three as had been the case under Suharto. Political parties were also not required to have Pancasila as their ideology. This resulted in the emergence of many political parties, and 48 would go on to compete in the 1999 legislative election.

In May 1999, the Habibie administration passed the Regional Autonomy Law, which was the first step in decentralising Indonesia's government and allowing provinces to have more part in governing their areas. The press became liberated under Habibie, although the Ministry of Information continued to exist. Political prisoners such as Sri Bintang Pamungkas, Muchtar Pakpahan, and Xanana Gusmão were also released under Habibie's orders.

Habibie also presided over the 1999 legislative elections, the first free election since 1955. It was supervised by the independent General Elections Commission (KPU) instead of an elections commission filled with government ministers as had been the case during the New Order. In a move that surprised many, and angered some, Habibie called for a referendum on the future of East Timor. Subsequently, on 30 August, the inhabitants of East Timor voted for independence. This territorial loss harmed Habibie's popularity and political alliances.

== Presidency of Wahid (1999–2001) ==
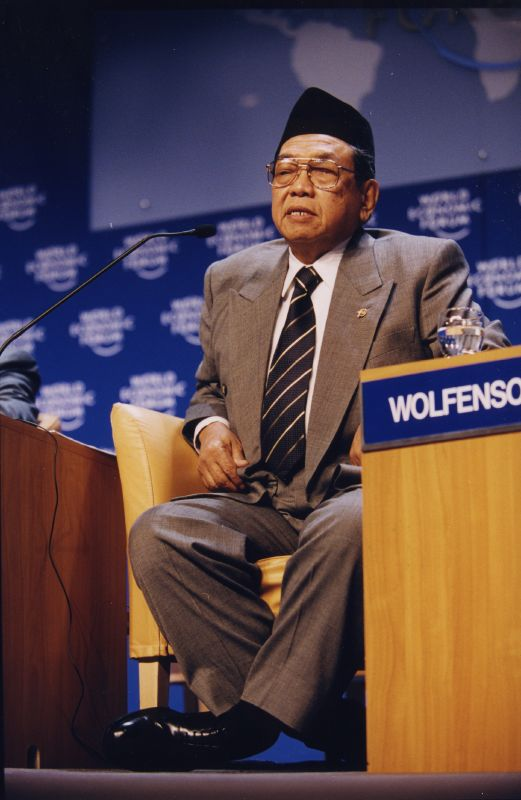
Abdurrahman Wahid at the World Economic Forum Annual Meeting Davos, 2000

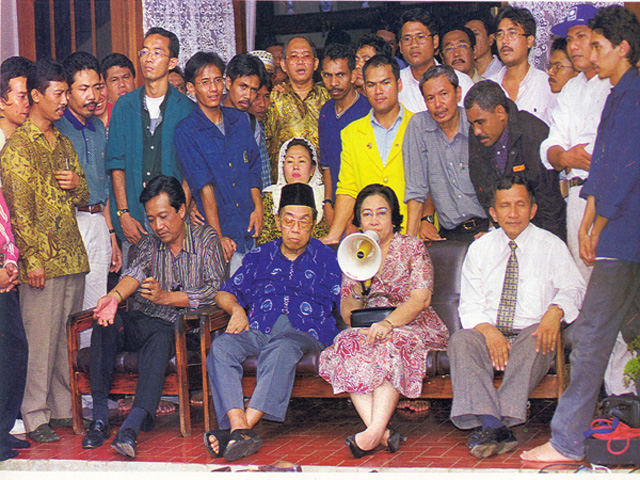
Megawati Sukarnoputri, Amien Rais, and Sultan Hamengkubuwono X at Wahid's Ciganjur residence in South Jakarta on 10 November 1998. Issuing the Ciganjur Declaration, calling for democratic reforms and the reduction of military influence in politics.

In 1999, Abdurrahman Wahid became President of Indonesia. His first cabinet, dubbed the National Unity Cabinet (Indonesian: Kabinet Persatuan Nasional), was a coalition cabinet that represented several political parties: the Indonesian Democratic Party of Struggle (PDI-P), National Awakening Party (PKB), Golkar, the United Development Party (PPP), National Mandate Party (PAN), and Justice Party (PK). Non-partisans and the military (TNI) were also represented in the cabinet. Among Wahid's administrative reforms were the abolition of the Ministry of Information, the New Order's primary weapon in controlling the media, and the disbandment of the Ministry of Welfare, which had become corrupt and extortionist under the New Order.

=== Autonomy and tolerance ===
Wahid intended to give rebellious Aceh province a referendum on various modes of autonomy, rather than an option for independence like in East Timor. Wahid also wanted to adopt a softer stance towards Aceh by having less military personnel on the ground. In March, the Wahid administration began to open negotiations with the Free Aceh Movement (GAM). Two months later in May, the government signed a memorandum of understanding with GAM to last until the beginning of 2001, by which time both signatories would have breached the agreement.

On 30 December 1999, Wahid visited Jayapura, the capital of Papua province (then known as "Irian Jaya"). Wahid was successful in convincing West Papuan leaders that he was a force for change and even encouraged the use of the name Papua.

In September 2000, Wahid declared martial law in Maluku. By now, it was evident that Laskar Jihad, a radical Islamic militia, were being assisted by members of the military and it was apparent that they were financed by Fuad Bawazier, the last Minister of Finance to have served under Suharto. During the same month, West Papuans raised their Morning Star flag. Wahid's response was to allow this provided that the Morning Star flag was placed lower than the Indonesian flag, for which he was severely criticised by Megawati and Akbar. On 24 December 2000, a series of bombings were directed against churches in Jakarta and eight cities across Indonesia.

In March of that year, Wahid suggested that the 1966 Provisional People's Consultative Assembly (MPRS) resolution on the banning of Marxism–Leninism be lifted.

=== Relations with the military ===
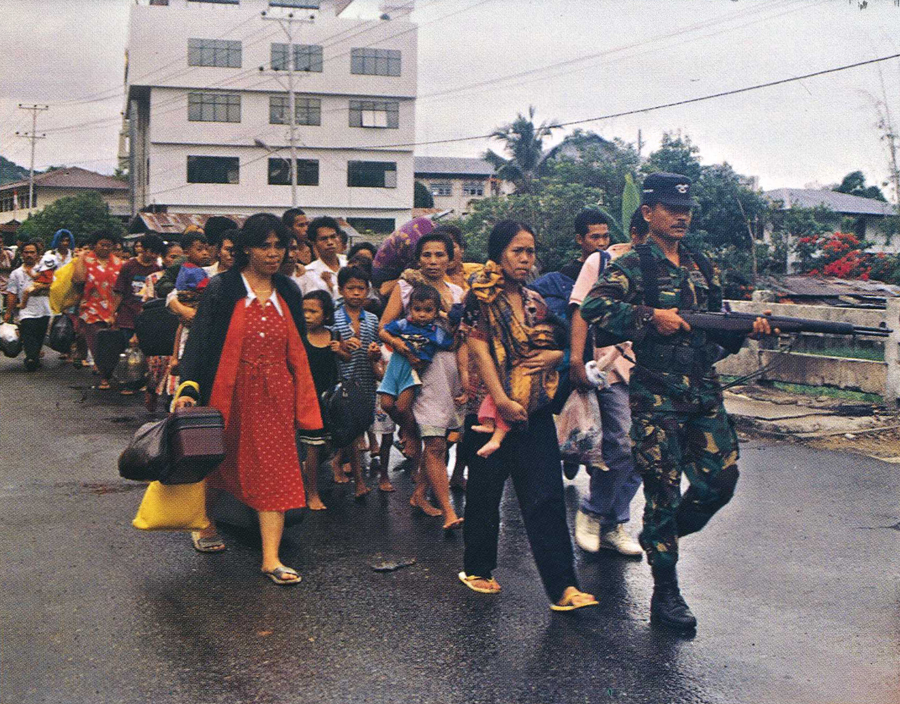
The Indonesian military evacuating civilians in Ambon during communal religious violence in 1999

When he ascended to the presidency, one of Wahid's goals was to reform the military and to remove its dominant socio-political role. In this venture, Wahid found an ally in Agus Wirahadikusumah, whom he made Commander of Kostrad in March. In July, Agus began uncovering a scandal involving Dharma Putra, a foundation with affiliations to Kostrad. Through Megawati, military members began pressuring Wahid to remove Agus. Wahid gave in to the pressure but then planned to have Agus appointed as the Army Chief of Staff to which top military leaders responded by threatening to retire and Wahid once again bowed down to pressure.

Wahid's relations with the military deteriorated even further when in the same month it was revealed that Laskar Jihad had arrived in Maluku and was being armed with what turned out to be military weapons, despite Wahid's orders to the military to block their entry into the region. The militia had planned earlier in the year to go to the archipelago and assist the Muslims there in their communal conflict with the Christians.

In 2000, Wahid was embroiled in two scandals that would damage his presidency. In May, the State Logistics Agency (Bulog) reported that US$4 million was missing from its pension fund. The missing cash had been embezzled by Wahid's own masseur, who claimed Wahid sent him to Bulog to collect the cash. Although the money was returned, Wahid's opponents took the chance of accusing him of being involved in the scandal and of being aware of what his masseur was up to. At the same time, Wahid was also accused of keeping a US$2 million donation made by the Sultan of Brunei to provide assistance in Aceh.

=== Impeachment of Wahid ===
By the end of 2000, many within the political elite were disillusioned with Wahid. The most prominent was Amien Rais who regretted having supported Wahid for the presidency the previous year. Amien attempted to rally opposition by encouraging Megawati and Akbar to flex their political muscles. Megawati surprisingly defended Wahid while Akbar preferred to wait for the 2004 legislative elections. At the end of November, 151 People's Representative Council (DPR) members signed a petition calling for the impeachment of Wahid.

In January 2001, Wahid announced that Chinese New Year was to become an optional holiday. Wahid followed this up in February by lifting the ban on the display of Chinese characters and the importing of Chinese publications. In February, Wahid visited Northern Africa as well as Saudi Arabia to undertake the hajj pilgrimage. Wahid made his last overseas visit in June 2001 when he visited Australia.

In a meeting with university rectors on 27 January 2001, Wahid commented on the possibility of Indonesia descending into anarchy. Wahid suggested that he may be forced to dissolve the DPR if that happened. Although the meeting was off-the-record, it caused quite a stir and added to the fuel of the movement against him. On 1 February, the DPR met to issue a memorandum against Wahid. Two memorandums constitute an MPR Special Session where the impeachment and removal of a president would be legal. The vote was overwhelmingly for the memorandum, and PKB members could only walk out in protest. The memorandum caused widespread protests by NU members. In East Java, NU members attacked Golkar's regional offices. In Jakarta, Wahid's opposition began accusing him of encouraging the protests. Wahid denied it and went to talk to the protesters at the town of Pasuruan, encouraging them to get off the streets. Nevertheless, NU protesters continued to show their support for Wahid and in April, announced that they were ready to defend and die for the president.

In March, Wahid tried to counter the opposition by moving against dissidents within his own cabinet. Minister of Justice Yusril Ihza Mahendra was removed for making public his demands for the president's resignation while the Minister of Forestry Nur Mahmudi Ismail was also removed under the suspicion of channelling his department's funds to Wahid's opposition. In response to this, Megawati began to distance herself and did not show up for the inauguration of the Ministers' replacement. On 30 April, the DPR issued a second memorandum and on the next day called for an MPR Special Session to be held on 1 August.

By July, Wahid grew desperate and ordered Susilo Bambang Yudhoyono (SBY), the Coordinating Minister for Politics and Security to declare a state of emergency. SBY refused, and Wahid removed him from his position. Finally, on 20 July, Amien declared that the MPR Special Session would be brought forward to 23 July. The TNI, having had a bad relationship with Wahid through his tenure as president, stationed 40,000 troops in Jakarta and placed tanks with their turrets pointing at the Presidential Palace in a show of force. To prevent the MPR Special Session from taking place, Wahid then enacted a Decree disbanding the MPR on 23 July despite having no power to do so. In defiance against Wahid's decree, the MPR proceeded with the Special Session and then unanimously voted to impeach Wahid, and to replace him with Megawati as president. Wahid continued to insist that he was the president and stayed for some days in the Presidential Palace but bowed down and left the residence on 25 July to immediately fly to the United States for health treatment.

== Presidency of Megawati (2001–2004) ==
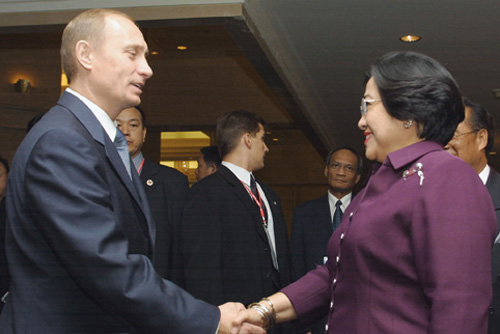
President Megawati and President Vladimir Putin

Under Megawati Sukarnoputri, the daughter of Indonesia's first president Sukarno, the process of democratic reform begun under Habibie and Wahid continued, albeit slowly and erratically. Megawati appeared to see her role mainly as a symbol of national unity, and she rarely actively intervened in government business. Under her tenure, the Mutual Assistance Cabinet (Indonesian: Kabinet Gotong Royong) helped govern the country. It included Megawati's successor, the retired General SBY. The military, disgraced at the time of Suharto's fall, regained much of its influence. Corruption continued to be pervasive though Megawati herself was seldom blamed for this, and also commence military operations against the GAM separatist.

Although the economy had stabilised and partly recovered from the 1997 crisis by 2004, unemployment and poverty remained high. The Indonesian Constitution was amended to provide for the direct election of the president, and Megawati stood for a second term. She consistently trailed in the opinion polls, due in part to the preference for male candidates among Muslim voters, and due to what was widely seen as a mediocre performance in office. Despite a somewhat better than expected performance in the first round of the elections, she was defeated by SBY in the second round.

== Presidency of Yudhoyono (2004–2014) ==
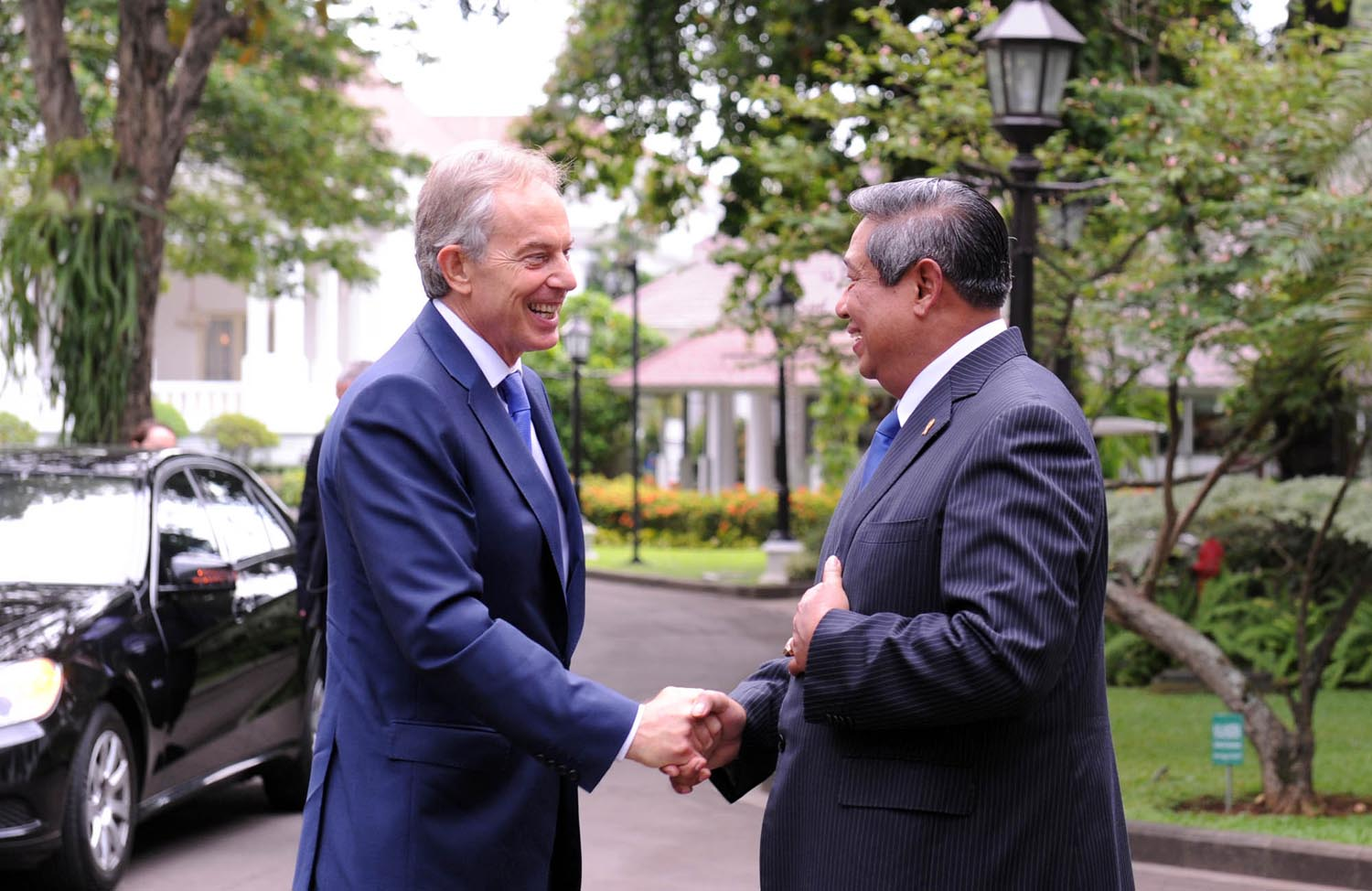
President SBY receiving a visit from former British PM Tony Blair at the Presidential Office, 20 March 2013

Susilo Bambang Yudhoyono was inaugurated as president on 20 October 2004. The next day, he announced his new cabinet, which would be known as the United Indonesia Cabinet (Kabinet Indonesia Bersatu). Consisting of 36 ministers, it included members of the Democratic Party, Golkar and the PPP, PBB, PKB, PAN, PKP, and PKS. Professionals were also named in the cabinet, most of them taking on ministries in the economic field. The military were also included, with five former members appointed to the cabinet. As Yudhoyono's promised during the election, four of the cabinet appointees were female.

=== Economy ===
In late 2007, Yudhoyono led Indonesia into a free trade agreement with Japan. In 2005, economic growth was 5.6% which decreased to 5.4% in 2006 Inflation reached 17.11% in 2005 but decreased to 6.6% in 2006.

Yudhoyono also allocated more funds to decrease poverty. In 2004, 11 trillion rupiah was set aside, increasing to 23 in 2005 and 42 in 2006. For 2007, 51 trillion was allocated. In March and October 2005, SBY made the unpopular decision to cut fuel subsidies, leading to increases in fuel prices of 29% and 125% respectively. The poor were somewhat compensated by the Direct Cash Assistance (BLT), but the cutting of subsidies damaged SBY's popularity. In May 2008, rising oil prices contributed to SBY's decision to cut fuel subsidies once more, which were the subject of protests in May and June 2008.

To alleviate the effects of rising prices on poor people, Yudhoyono introduced cash transfers, known in Indonesia as Bantuan Langsung Tunai (BLT, Direct Cash Assistance), from October 2005 to December 2006 with a target of 19.2 million poor families. BLT was given again in 2008. The BLT concept was the idea of vice president Jusuf Kalla. In 2013, BLT was renamed Bantuan Langsung Sementara Masyarakat (BLSM, Temporary Community Direct Assistance). The BLT program has been criticized as a unsustainable tool to make Yudhoyono more popular during election years.

=== Disasters ===
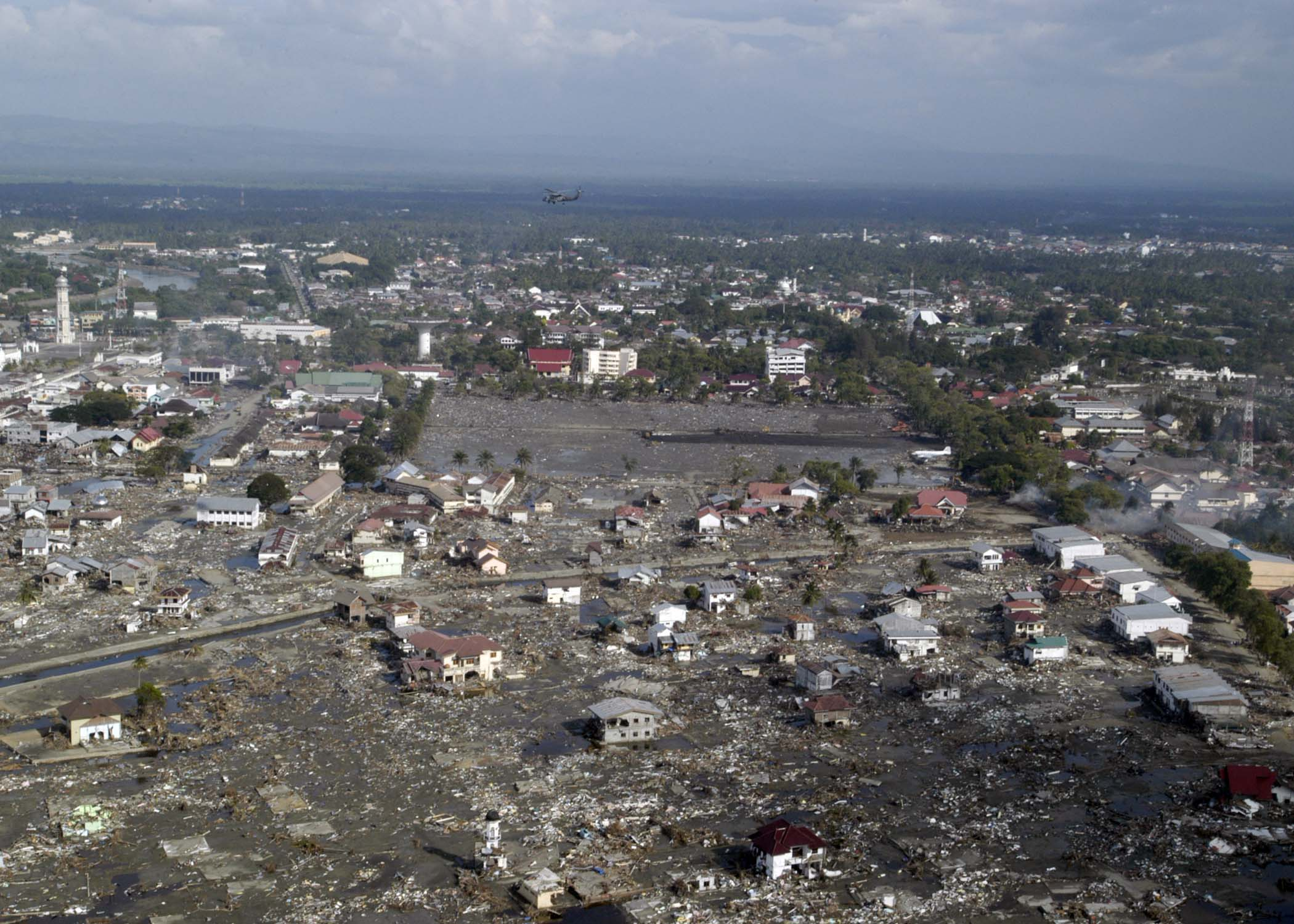
Damage following the 2004 tsunami and earthquake in Banda Aceh

Two months after SBY assumed office, the 2004 Indian Ocean earthquake and tsunami struck Aceh and other countries along the Indian Ocean coastline. Three months later, an aftershock of the earthquake triggered a tsunami in Nias Island. In 2006, Mount Merapi erupted and was followed by an earthquake in Yogyakarta. In October 2010, Mount Merapi erupted, killing 353 people, while an earthquake and tsunami struck the Mentawai Islands. Indonesia also suffered a small outbreak of bird flu and endured the Sidoarjo mud flow. In 2007, severe floods struck Jakarta. SBY allowed Jakarta governor Sutiyoso to open the Manggarai watergate with the risk of flooding the Presidential Palace.

=== Terror attacks ===
On 1 October 2005, suicide bombings occurred on the island of Bali. The attacks bore the hallmarks of the militant Islamic group Jemaah Islamiyah (JI)—a group linked to Al-Qaeda—though police investigation was underway. The group was also responsible for the 2002 Bali bombings. SBY condemned the attack, promising to "hunt down the perpetrators and bring them to justice.".

=== 2009 election ===
In 2009, Yudhoyono was elected for a second term along with Boediono, the former governor of Bank Indonesia. They defeated two candidates: Megawati Sukarnoputri – Prabowo Subianto and incumbent vice-president, Jusuf Kalla – Wiranto. The Yudhoyono-Boediono ticket won the election with more than 60% votes of nationwide in the first round. Yudhoyono's Second United Indonesia Cabinet was announced in October 2009 after he was re-elected as president earlier in the year.

== Presidency of Widodo (2014–2024) ==
=== 2014 election ===
In 2014, constitutionally barred from running for a third term, SBY was succeeded by Joko Widodo (popularly known as Jokowi) with Kalla returning as vice president, defeating Prabowo and Hatta Rajasa. Jokowi is the first president without a high-ranking military or political background. During his 2014 election campaign, Jokowi promised to improve economic GDP growth to 7% and to end the bagi-bagi kursi (giving government positions to political allies) policy, although these promises are yet to be fulfilled. The Indonesian rupiah hit its lowest level record in 20 years during his administration.

=== First term ===
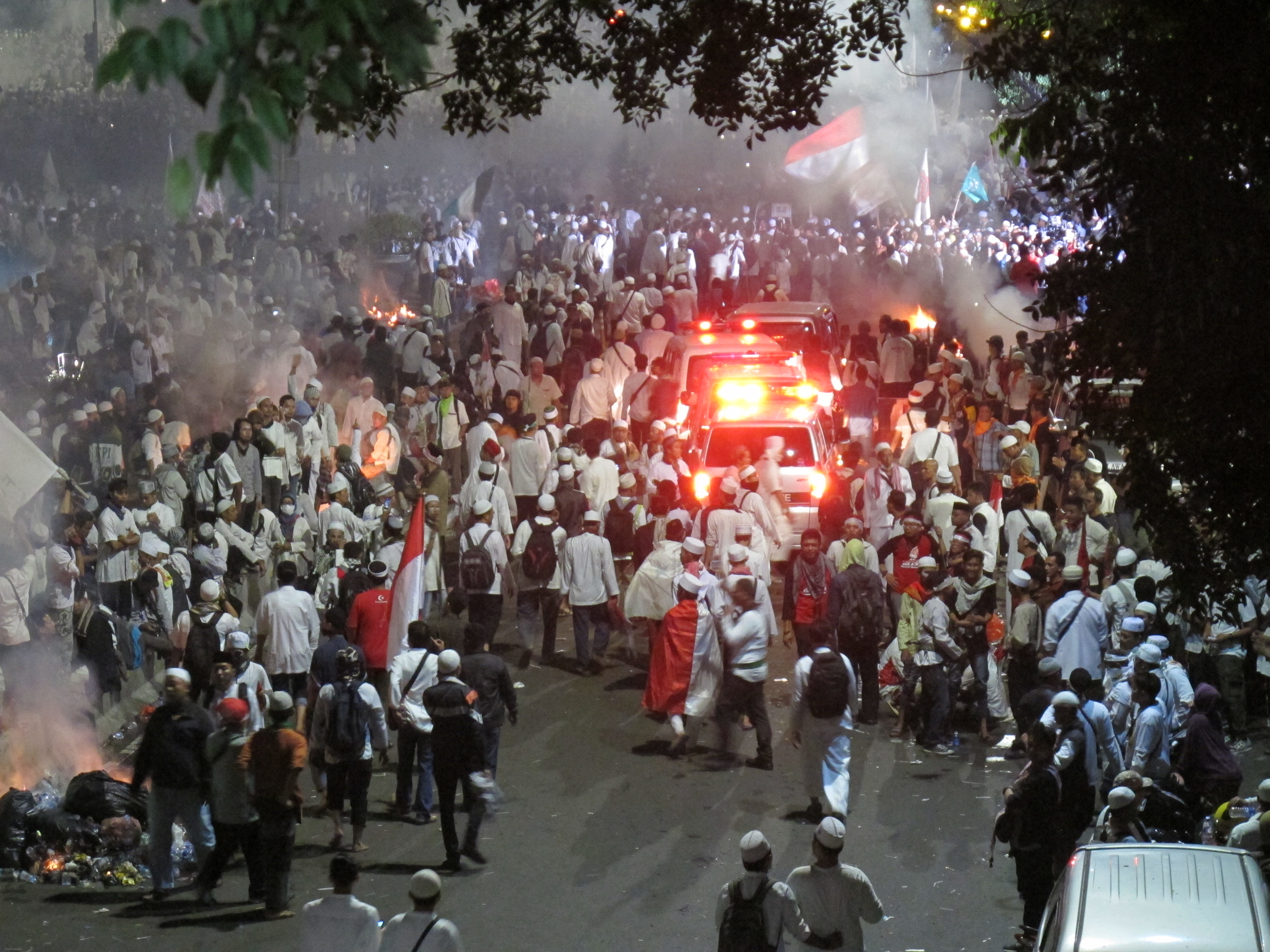
Islamist protests in Jakarta, 2016

A controversial remark by his former deputy governor Basuki Tjahaja Purnama (Ahok) led to divisions in the country's Muslim population amid a gubernatorial election. Protests were held in response to Ahok's remark by Islamist groups in November and December 2016 in Jakarta. The Jokowi administration responded by banning the Indonesian chapter of Hizb ut-Tahrir.

There have been concerns of declining freedom of expression during this period, evidenced by the arrest, detainment, and imprisonment of many people for their social media activity being interpreted as an insult to the president and the government.

Several disasters, such as earthquakes (In Palu, Lombok, and Banten) and a haze due to deforestation in Borneo and Sumatra occurred during this period. ISIL-linked bombings have also occurred in Jakarta and Surabaya.

Central Statistics Agency reported in March 2018 that the poverty rate in Indonesia was 9.82 percent, down from March 2017 which was 10.64 percent. This was the first time that poverty levels in Indonesia had been reduced to below two digits. Previously, the poverty rate was always above 10 percent, even reaching 23.4 percent in 1999 after the 1997–1998 crisis.

=== 2019 election ===
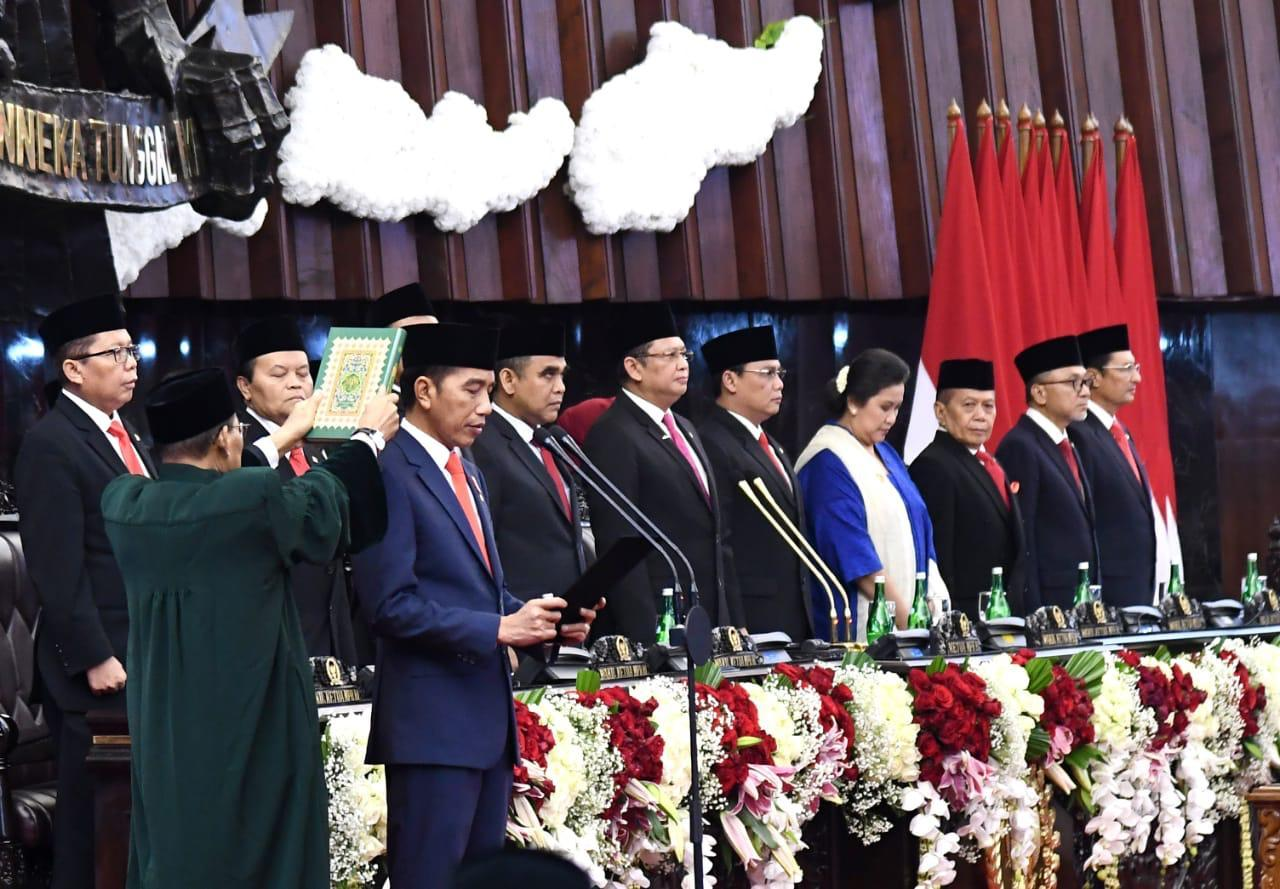
Second inauguration of Joko Widodo, 20 October 2019

On 17 April 2019, Indonesia held a general election. For the first time, eligible voters chose the president, the vice president, members of the People's Consultative Assembly (MPR), and members of local legislative bodies simultaneously. The election was described as "one of the most complicated single-day ballots in global history". Jokowi and his vice presidential candidate Ma'ruf Amin won the election against Prabowo and his running mate Sandiaga Uno. It was followed by protests and riots in May rejecting the re-election during which at least 8 protesters were killed. On 16 August 2019, forty-three Papuan students in Surabaya, East Java were arrested by police following reports that an Indonesian flag was damaged outside the building where they lived, leading to protests in Papua and other parts of Indonesia. A series of mass demonstrations led by students took place in major cities of Indonesia in September 2019 to protest against new legislation that reduces the authority of the Corruption Eradication Commission (KPK), as well as several bills. The protests subsequently developed into the largest student movement in Indonesia since the 1998 demonstrations that brought down the Suharto regime. On 26 August 2019, President Joko Widodo announced that the country's new capital city will be located in East Kalimantan on Borneo island. The new capital will replace Jakarta and will be built in parts of Penajam North Paser Regency and Kutai Kartanegara Regency.

=== Pandemic ===
An ongoing worldwide pandemic of coronavirus disease 2019 (COVID-19), a novel infectious disease caused by severe acute respiratory syndrome coronavirus 2 (SARS-CoV-2), was first confirmed to have spread to Indonesia on 2 March 2020. As of 5 November 2020, the coronavirus has killed more than 14,000 people in Indonesia. In late 2020, the pandemic has caused the economy to fall into a recession for the first time in 22 years. In October 2020, protests erupted throughout Indonesia after the DPR passed the controversial Omnibus Law on Job Creation.

== Presidency of Prabowo (2024–present) ==
=== 2024 election ===
In March 2024, Prabowo Subianto won the presidential election, meaning he will become Indonesia's next president with his running mate Gibran Rakabuming Raka, son of outgoing President Joko Widodo, as new vice president. On 20 October 2024, Prabowo Subianto was sworn in as Indonesia's eighth president.

In January 2025, Indonesia formally joined the BRICS group as the first Southeast Asian nation.

Indonesia has joined the Board of Peace, with President Prabowo expressing hope that this membership will enable Indonesia to help realize a two-state solution.
