= 1998 Indonesian coup d'état attempt =

Failed military coup attempt in Indonesia

- Part of the Fall of Suharto and the Reform era
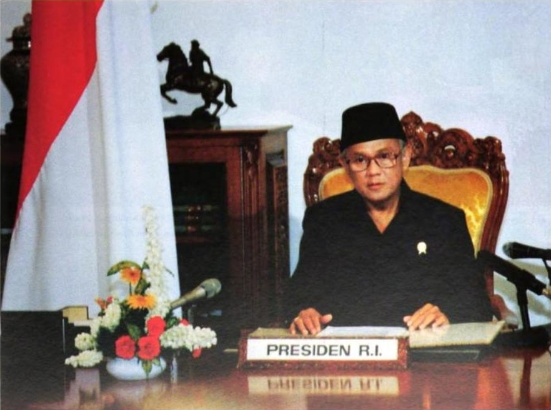
- The State Address after B. J. Habibie was inaugurated as the President of the Republic of Indonesia, 21 May 1998. The next day, elements of Kostrad surrounded Habibie's home.
Date	22 May 1998
Location	Jakarta, Indonesia
Result	Coup attempt aborted; Prabowo Subianto removed as commander of Kostrad; Wiranto retained command authority during the presidential transition

Belligerents
Pro-Prabowo faction; Kostrad; Kostrad headquarters troops; Kostrad Makassar; Yonif 328/Dirgahayu; Yon Arhanud 1/Purwa Bajra Cakti; Yonif 305/Tengkorak; Kopassus; Kopassus Kartasura	Government of Indonesia; Office of President B. J. Habibie; Paspampres; ABRI Loyalists ("red and white" faction); PPRC ABRI

Commanders and leaders
Prabowo Subianto; Muchdi P. R. Kivlan Zen	(Indonesia) B. J. Habibie; Wiranto; Sintong Panjaitan; Ryamizard Ryacudu; Endriartono Sutarto

Casualties and losses
- None directly attributed to the confrontation.
- The event is disputed. Habibie accused Prabowo of attempting a coup after Suharto's resignation, while Prabowo denied the accusation.

The 1998 Indonesian coup d'état attempt was an alleged attempt by Lieutenant General Prabowo Subianto, then commander of Kostrad, to pressure or remove newly inaugurated Indonesian president B. J. Habibie during the political crisis that followed the fall of Suharto in May 1998. The episode occurred amid the collapse of the New Order, the formation of Habibie's Development Reform Cabinet, and an internal military struggle between Prabowo and Armed Forces commander Wiranto.

On 22 May 1998, one day after Habibie succeeded Suharto, Wiranto reported to the president that troops suspected to be from Kostrad were moving toward Jakarta and that soldiers had concentrated around Habibie's residence in Kuningan and the Merdeka Palace. Habibie later wrote that he concluded Prabowo had moved troops without the knowledge of the ABRI commander and ordered Wiranto to replace him as Pangkostrad before sunset.

The incident ended with Prabowo's removal from Kostrad and his transfer to a non-combat position at the Army Command and Staff School in Bandung. He was later discharged from the armed forces after a military honour council examined his role in the abduction of activists during the final months of the New Order. The nature behind coup attempt remains to be disputed. President Habibie and several later accounts portrayed the incident as a coup d'état, Prabowo maintained that the troop movement was a security measure, whilst Wiranto and Subagyo fully denied that such an attempt had ever happened.

== Background ==
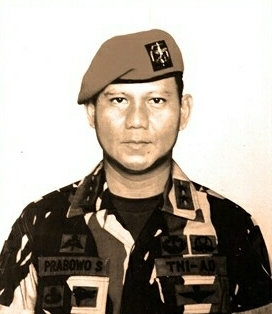
Prabowo as Commandant General of Kopassus

According to his autobiography, on the morning of 22 May 1998 in the aftermath of B. J. Habibie's inauguration of president, he was trying to settle his cabinet and the military leadership. On 06:10 AM on 22 May, he telephoned Wiranto and asked him to serve as Minister of Defence/Commander of the Armed Forces of the Republic of Indonesia (Pangab) in the new cabinet.

A day before, Prabowo had his civilian and military advisers to draft a proposed a cabinet lineup. In the content, Prabowo recommended the defence minister and ABRI commander posts would be separated, Wiranto would become defence minister, Subagyo would become ABRI commander, and Prabowo would become Army chief. Kivlan Zen was sent to Nasution's home. According to Kivlan Zen, he attempted to contact Abdul Haris Nasution and learned that the retired general was ill. Kivlan then left Kostrad headquarters at around 6:00 a.m. to meet Him.

During the meeting, Nasution allegedly asked Kivlan to draft a letter addressed to President B. J. Habibie and asked him where to sign.The draft stated that "Dearest Habibie, the situation is getting more critical and cannot be resolved. Wiranto, the ABRI commander, has not been able to resolve this from May 12-22, 1998. It would be better to appoint someone else as commander, it would be better if it were Subagyo and as Army Chief of Staff it would be Prabowo." Kivlan later said that Nasution signed the letter after it had been drafted. Speaking at a discussion, Kivlan joked that he had written the letter in such a way that he himself might benefit from the reshuffle, saying that he could become commander of Kostrad. After obtaining Nasution's signature, Kivlan reportedly went to Muchdi Purwopranjono's office and invited him to accompany him to meet Habibie and deliver the letter.

Around 07:30, Sintong Panjaitan, a close aide to habibie, told him that Muchdi Purwopranjono, then Danjen Kopassus, and Kivlan Zen had arrived carrying letters from Prabowo and from retired General A. H. Nasution. Habibie initially did not want to receive them personally because he was occupied with cabinet materials, but Sintong advised him to receive the letters under security precautions. Habibie says he read the letters at the doorway, gave only the short response "I've read them," and returned to his work. The content that caught Habibie's attention was Nasution's letter, which proposed Subagyo Hadi Siswoyo as Pangab and Prabowo as Army chief of staff.

== Incident ==
At about 09:00, Habibie left Kuningan for the Merdeka Palace. Wiranto was waiting in front of the palace steps and asked to report privately. Habibie was already almost an hour late and worried that delay might fuel speculation that he had failed to form the Development Reform Cabinet, but he allowed Wiranto to follow him into the president's office. At this hour, Commander of ABRI Wiranto reported movements of Kostrad troops toward Jakarta and concentrations of troops near Habibie's residence in Kuningan and the Merdeka Palace without Wiranto's knowledge as armed forces commander. Habibie interpreted the movements as a possible threat to the new presidency and ordered Prabowo's removal as commander of Kostrad. Wiranto later disputed Habibie's version, saying that he had reassured Habibie that no coup would take place.

According to Terence Lee, Prabowo reacted badly to his removal from Kostrad and reassignment to Seskoad. Lee writes that Prabowo first appealed directly to Suharto shortly after Suharto's resignation speech, but was rebuked by Suharto and members of Suharto's family, who believed that Prabowo had provoked the unrest that led to Suharto's downfall. From then on Prabowo tried to meet Habibie in person but failed. He tried again in the afternoon but also failed. After his repeated efforts to see Habibie, he would instead arrive at Habibie's residence and demanding through the president's adjutant that the transfer order be reversed and the military leadership reshuffled.

According to the testimony of President Habibie's military adviser, retired Lieutenant General Sintong Panjaitan, the street in front of Habibie's residence in Patra Kuningan was crowded with ABRI personnel during the ordeal. Members of Kopassus and the Presidential Security Force (Paspampres) occupied the approximately six-metre-wide road. Paspampres personnel ordered the Kopassus troops to withdraw from the vicinity of the residence, but the latter refused, stating that they would only comply with orders from the Commander of Kopassus, Major General Muchdi Purwopranjono. The refusal resulted in a tense standoff between Kopassus and Paspampres. During so, Paspampres commander, Endriartono Sutarto, became concerned as his troops were armed only with blank ammunition while the Kopassus soldiers carried live rounds. Expecting the worst, Endriartono contacted Panjaitan and requested authorization for Paspampres personnel to be issued live ammunition.

Prabowo then stormed into Habibie's office and demanded to be made commander-in-chief of the armed forces alongside his cabinet demands. Such action was impossible for Habibie; for one, Wiranto was already confirmed to be commander-in-chief. According to President Habibie in his book Detik-detik Yang Menentukan, Habibie wrote that Prabowo stated, "What kind of a president are you? you are naive!" and said that Habibie had insulted the Soemitro family, while Habibie only responded to Prabowo's words by saying, "I don't give a damn, as President I must pay attention to the state of the nation," and asked Prabowo to hand over all of his troops before sunset. The heated confrontation had left Habibie frightened, and he gave the excuse that promotions were up to the military. Noticing a shook Habibie, an aide took initiative and pretended he was in a call with Wiranto. Not wanting to confront Wiranto, Prabowo left through the kitchen.

== Aftermath ==
According to the autobiography of Soemitro Djojohadikoesoemo, Prabowo's father, however, President Habibie said that the dismissal was a direct request from President Soeharto, while another source said that Prabowo would be appointed ambassador to the United States. That afternoon, Prabowo handed over the position of Commander of Kostrad to the Commander of Kostrad Division I, Johny Lumintang. What ever it might be, Wiranto signed the order relieving Prabowo and Muchdi P.R. at around noon on Friday, 22 May 1998, and instructed Army Chief Subagyo Hadi Siswoyo to carry it out immediately. During this time Prabowo was on a helicopter inspection with Sjafrie Sjamsoeddin when he was told the news, and that he first went to Fanny Habibie, B. J. Habibie's younger brother, to confirm it.

Prabowo stated that he believed he could have launched a coup during the days of unrest in May. However, he stated, "The decision to accelerate my retirement was legitimate," he said. Prabowo further explained, "I knew that many of my soldiers would do whatever I ordered. However, I did not want them to die fighting for my position. I wanted to demonstrate that I placed the good of my country and its people above my own position. I am a loyal soldier. Loyal to the state, loyal to the republic." Prabowo stated that the reason for the concentration of troops was to secure the president, but Habibie said that this was the duty of Paspampres, not Kostrad.

After May 1998, he flew to Amman, Jordan. He was rumored to have received an offer of citizenship from Abdullah II. He rejected the offer. Prince Abdullah II, who later became King of Jordan in 1999, had been Prabowo's friend at military school. Prabowo returned to Indonesia in November 2001.

== See also ==
- May 1998 Indonesia riots
