= Usop =

Usop is an Indonesian family name used by the Dayak people.

Usop or USOP may also refer to:

== Entertainment ==
- United States of Poetry, an American television series
- Usop Sontorian, a Malaysian animated cartoon series

== People ==
- K. M. A. Usop, (Kema Muhammad Aini Usop, 1936 – 2015), an Indonesian academic and politician
- Usop, a member of the Kopratasa male vocal trio in Malaysia

== Sports ==
- USOP Association, the United States Olympians and Paralympians Association
- USOP Committee, the United States Olympic & Paralympic Committee
- USOP National Pickleball Center, home of the U.S. Open Pickleball Championships

== See also ==
- Usopp, a fictional manga character
