= Sanggau Ledo =

District in Indonesia

- District
- Location within West Kalimantan Location within Kalimantan Location within Indonesia
- Coordinates: 1°8′27.72564″N 109°41′40.38274″E
- Country: Indonesia
- Province: West Kalimantan
- Regency: Bengkayang
- District seat: Lembang

Area
  - Total: 273.05 km^{2} (105.43 sq mi)

Population (2025 estimate)
  - Total: 16,200
  - Density: 59.3/km^{2} (154/sq mi)
- Regional code: 61.07.06

Sanggau Ledo is a district in Bengkayang Regency, West Kalimantan, Indonesia. As of 2025, the population is estimated at 16,200 people. It has a total area of 273.05 km^{2}.

The district is bordered by Tujuh Belas to the east, Sambas Regency to the west, Ledo to the south, and Seluas to the north. It is often considered a border region due to its close proximity to the Malaysian border.

The district was added as part of Bengkayang Regency when the regency was established in 1999. Previously, it had been part of Sambas Regency.

== History ==
=== Indonesian independence ===
Indonesian nationalists from Sanggau Ledo participated in the Indonesian National Revolution against the Dutch colonial empire. After Indonesian nationalists took control of the city of Bengkayang in October 1946, around 27 fighters from Sanggau Ledo, led by Uray Dachlan, traveled to Bengkayang to reinforce the nationalists. However, the city was taken back by the Dutch before they arrived, and most of the fighters were killed.

=== Ethnic riots ===
In the late 1960s, many militants of the North Kalimantan Communist Party under the leadership of Sayid Ahmad Sofyan Baraqbah used the Sanggau Ledo area as a base of operations. Hundreds of the militants camped in the forests in the district. Although much of the leadership was Javanese, the militants recruited heavily from the ethnic Chinese population, and the Indonesian military conflated the two groups. On 3 September, 1967, nine Dayaks from Sanggau Ledo were abducted, and their bodies were discovered by the military shortly after. The military blamed the kidnappings and murders on the militants and called on Dayaks to "take revenge for blood with blood". In October, around 80 Chinese locals were killed by a Dayak mob. Thousands of Chinese were then expelled from the district by the military.

Many of the abandoned properties in Sanggau Ledo were occupied by Madurese migrants, leading to renewed ethnic tensions. In late 1996, these tensions escalated when the Sanggau Ledo riots began in the district. Two Dayak men were stabbed in Ledo by a man from Lempang, Sanggau Ledo, and false rumors spread that they had died and that the "killer" was Madurese. Thousands of Dayaks descended on Sanggau Ledo from surrounding regions, burning practically every Madurese house in the district, resulting in the expulsion of the entire Madurese community. At least 248 homes were burned during the riots.

In 1999, during the Sambas riots, Madurese houses were again burned by Dayak mobs in Sanggau Ledo following the killing of a Dayak man in Samalantan. This resulted in the Madurese who had returned being expelled from the region again.

=== Harry Hadisoemantri Air Force Base ===
The Harry Hadisoemantri Air Force Base, sometimes referred to as the Sanggau Ledo Air Force Base, is located in Sanggau Ledo. It was previously called Singkawang II Air Force Base and was originally built by the Dutch to defend against the Japanese invasion during World War II. It served as a secret air base for the Dutch during the Battle of Borneo, until the Japanese military bombed and then captured the base in late 1941.

Since Indonesian independence, the base has been used by the Indonesian Air Force. According to the commander of the base, it was originally the largest air force base in Kalimantan.

In 1967, the base was attacked by militant wings of the North Kalimantan Communist Party, leading to the deaths of three members of the air force and one civilian. Over a hundred weapons were also taken by the militants.

After 1990, the base largely fell out of regular use, being overtaken by larger and newer air force bases. During the 1996-1997 Sanggau Ledo riots, the air base was used to shelter Madurese locals fleeing the violence. In 2016, the commander of the base, Sumantri Hidayat, said that border patrol aircraft had not used the base since 1990. Later that year, the base was renamed to Harry Hadisoemantri Air Force Base. It has since been used for border security again.

The base has had a significant effect on the community in Sanggau Ledo. The officers and workers at the base live in the community, and many of their descendants are now part of the general population.

=== Land disputes ===
By the 1980s, 15% of the Sanggau Ledo population were migrants, both government-sponsored, known as transmigrants, as well as spontaneous. The majority of locals were given no compensation when their lands were appropriated for transmigration sites, creating hostility between the locals and migrants.

== Demographics ==
=== Religion ===
The biggest religious groups in Sanggau Ledo are Protestants, Catholics, and Muslims. In 2020, there were 8,819 Muslims, 3,043 Protestants, and 3,652 Catholics in the district. There were also 134 people professing other beliefs, mostly Buddhism. As of 2023, the district has 15 mosques, 20 musallas, 18 Protestant churches, and 6 Catholic churches. It was also reported to have a Chinese temple in 2020.

=== Ethnicity ===
The largest ethnic groups in Sanggau Ledo are Dayak, Malay, and Javanese. Many of the Javanese in the district came through the transmigration program. In the mid-1990s, the Madurese constituted the largest ethnic group in the district, with a population of at least 3,102, and another estimate putting the number at almost 10 thousand. However, following the 1997 Sanggau Ledo riots, the Madurese population fell to just 19 people. The vast majority never returned.

== Economy ==
Sanggau Ledo's economy is mostly based on agriculture. As of 2025, its top produce crops include cucumbers, cayenne peppers, chili peppers, bananas, and durian. Other commodities produced in significant quantities include palm oil, rice, and rubber.

== Culture ==
Dayak culture has a strong influence on Sanggau Ledo. Dayak festivals, including Gawai Dayak, are frequently held in the district. Popular cuisine includes palm wine, sticky rice, and rotan shoots.

== Administrative divisions ==
Sanggau Ledo consists of five villages (desa). All of the villages are considered rural.

Name of desa	Area in km^{2}	Pop'n estimate 2024
Bange	55.29	3,891
Lembang	36.18	5,504
Sango	73.4	2,433
Gua	41.75	2,609
Danti	66.43	1,465
Totals	273.05	15,902

In 1979, the Indonesian government passed a law standardizing village sizes. This resulted in sixteen villages in Sanggau Ledo having to be merged into other villages, leaving the district with twelve villages. Another three villages were transferred to Seluas district in 1996. Finally, in 2006, four of its nine villages were split off to form Tujuh Belas district, leaving the district with its current five villages.

=== Lembang ===
Lembang is the district capital of Sanggau Ledo. It is also the smallest and most populous village in the district, making up about 35% of the total population. It consists of three hamlets: Panda, Jawa, and Sanggau Kota.

Lembang is ethnically diverse, with 1,533 Malays, 1,196 Dayaks, 1,102 Javanese, 480 Sundanese, and 325 Chinese, as of 2022. The village also had a significant Madurese population in the Sanggau Kota and Jawa hamlets prior to the Sanggau Ledo riots. Almost 70% of the population are Muslim, 18% are Catholic, and 11% are Protestant. The village also has a small Buddhist community, making up a bit over 1% of the population.

The village was named after a Dutch businessman who started clove and tobacco plantations in the area. It was officially established as a village in 1984.

=== Bange ===
Bange is the second most populated village in Sanggau Ledo, making up around 25% of the total population of the district. It consists of three hamlets: Sejajah, Kandasan, and Merabu.

As of 2021, the large majority of the people in Bange identify as Dayak, making up about 78% of the population. Most of the rest identify as "other", at 14%. The next highest groups are Javanese at 2.5% and Malay at 2%. Prior to the Sanggau Ledo riots, the Kandasan and Merabu hamlets both had significant Madurese populations. The Dayak Bakatiʼ language is widely spoken in the village.

Over 96% of workers in the village are employed in the agricultural sector. The remainder are government workers, traders, and members of the Indonesian National Armed Forces. Around 26% of the village are students or unemployed.

Bange was officially established as a village in 1987. It was named after a fruit in the area, called bangek. The Harry Hadisoemantri Air Force Base is also located in Bange, in Kandasan Hamlet.
