= Sampit conflict =

2001 inter-ethnic violence throughout Central Kalimantan, Indonesia

- Part of the Post-Suharto era
| Date | February 18–28, 2001 |
| Location | Sampit, Central Kalimantan, Indonesia |
| Result | Riots ended by February 28; Small-scale riots continued throughout the year |

Belligerents
| Dayak rioters | Madurese rioters | Indonesia: TNI; POLRI |

Strength
| 32,000 in Sampit 1,500,000 in Central Kalimantan | 90,000 in Sampit | 4,000–5,000 in Central Kalimantan |

Casualties and losses
| 188 killed | 500–1,000 killed (100–700 beheaded); 100,000–250,000 displaced | 6 killed |

The Sampit conflict, also called Sampit war or Sampit riots, was an outbreak of inter-ethnic violence in Indonesia, beginning in February 2001 and lasting through the year. The conflict started in the town of Sampit, Central Kalimantan, and spread throughout the province, including the capital Palangka Raya. The conflict took place between the indigenous Dayak people and the migrant Madurese people from the island of Madura off Java. The exact origin of the conflict is disputed, but it eventually culminated in hundreds of deaths, with at least one hundred Madurese being decapitated.

== Background ==
The 2001 Sampit conflict was not an isolated incident, as there had been previous incidents of violence between the Dayak and the Madurese. Between December 1996 and January 1997, the Sanggau Ledo riots had resulted in more than 600 deaths. The Madurese first arrived in Borneo in 1930 under the transmigration program initiated by the Dutch colonial administration, and continued by the Indonesian government. In 1999, Malays and Dayak in Kalimantan joined forces to persecute and massacre Madurese during the Sambas conflict. 3,000 were killed in the massacres, with the Indonesian government doing little to stop the violence.

In 2000, transmigrants made up 21 percent of the population in Central Kalimantan. The Dayak came into competition with the highly visible and industrious Madurese, and in places like Sampit the Madurese quickly dominated low-level sectors of the economy, which negatively affected Dayak employment prospects. Additionally, new laws had allowed the Madurese to assume control of many commercial industries in the province, such as logging, mining, and plantations.

There are a number of stories purportedly describing the incident that sparked the violence in 2001. One version claims that it was caused by an arson attack on a Dayak house. Rumors spread that the fire was caused by Madurese, and later a group of Dayak began burning houses in a Madurese neighborhood.

K. M. A. Usop of the Dayak People's Association claims that the massacres by the Dayak were in self-defense, after the Dayak were attacked. It was claimed that a Dayak was tortured and killed by a gang of Madurese following a gambling dispute in the nearby village of Kerengpangi on December 17, 2000.

Another version claims that the conflict started in a brawl between students of different ethnic groups at the same school.

== Decapitations and cannibalism ==
At least 300 Madurese were decapitated by the Dayak during the conflict. The Dayak have a long history in the ritual practice of headhunting, though the practice was thought to have gradually died out in the early 20th century as it was discouraged by the Dutch colonial rulers.

There are also reports that in many cases, the killers drank the blood of their victims, cut out their hearts and ate them. A Dayak spokesperson said that, because of their anger and resentment against the Madurese settlers, "They don't recognize whether they are women or children. They just see them as animals that have to be destroyed." A Madurese survivor mourned his murdered children and grandchildren: "They cut off their heads and then cut them up and took them away to eat." Police and army, though called to the scene, seem to have done little to stop the violence until at least 500 people were dead.

== Response by authorities ==
The scale of the massacre and intensity of the aggression made it difficult for the military and the police to control the situation in Central Kalimantan. Reinforcements were sent in to help existing military personnel in the province. By February 18, the Dayak assumed control over Sampit.

Police arrested a local official believed to have been one of the masterminds behind the attacks. The masterminds are suspected of paying six men to provoke the riot in Sampit. The police also arrested a number of Dayak rioters following the initial murder spree.

A few days later, on February 21, thousands of Dayak surrounded a police station in Palangkaraya demanding the release of Dayak detainees. The Indonesian police succumbed to this demand given that they were vastly outnumbered by the aggressive Dayak. By February 28, the Indonesian military had managed to clear the Dayak off the streets and restore order, but sporadic violence continued throughout the year.

== See also ==
- Cannibalism in Asia § Sumatra and Borneo
- Fall of Suharto
- Sambas riots
- Tarakan riot, a smaller riot between Dayak Tidung and Bugis people in Tarakan
- Transmigration program
