= May 2019 Jakarta protests and riots =

Civil unrest in Indonesia

- Date: 21–22 May 2019
- Location: Jakarta, Indonesia
- Type: Demonstration, riot
- Deaths: 8
- Injuries: 600+

May 2019 Jakarta protests and riots (Jakarta)

Protesting and riots took place on 21 and 22 May 2019 in Jakarta, the capital of Indonesia, mainly around the Tanah Abang district of Central Jakarta and in West Jakarta. The unrest followed former general Prabowo Subianto's refusal to accept defeat in the 2019 Indonesian presidential election to incumbent President Joko Widodo, also known as Jokowi.

Prabowo's campaign team had called for protests after preliminary results showed Jokowi's victory. The protests commenced on the day of the official announcement of the election result on 21 May. Tense protests around the election agencies' buildings were followed by rioting on the night of 21 May in several areas. Eight people were reported killed by security officers through extrajudicial killings, while hundreds other were injured.

Amnesty International released a report which condemning the brutal treatments on protesters as "grave human rights violations."

== Background ==
In the immediate aftermath of the 17 April 2019 Indonesian presidential election, candidate Prabowo Subianto and his campaign team claimed the election had been rife with cheating favouring the incumbent president, although international observers declared the election free and fair. Prabowo claimed victory, despite unofficial quick count results indicating Jokowi's re-election. Observers noted the election was "divisive", particularly between religious conservatives and moderates. Opposition figures in Prabowo's campaign team, such as Amien Rais and Rizieq Shihab, called for a "People Power" movement, comparing it to protests that preceded the downfall of Suharto in 1998. Prior to the announcement of official results, Prabowo supporters had staged protests in front of the General Elections Commission (KPU).

Prabowo's supporters and campaign team planned for a demonstration at the KPU office on the expected announcement date of 22 May 2019, calling for the disqualification of Jokowi, and stated they intended the protests to be peaceful. Prabowo insisted he would not accept the election result, and his campaign team requested KPU to stop tallying votes. Opposition figure Fadli Zon indicated that Prabowo would not challenge the results at the Constitutional Court, citing Prabowo's loss in 2014.

Throughout May 2019, several "People Power" endorsers such as Kivlan Zen were questioned by the Indonesian National Police (Polri) on suspicion of treason. Twenty-nine people, mostly former ISIL members, were arrested on suspicion of planning terror attacks at the rallies. Citing possible infiltration by terrorists, police requested the protests not be held. On 20 May 2019, former Kopassus commander and Prabowo supporter Soenarko was arrested under charges of illegal firearms possession. Soenarko had previously been recorded on video as having instructed Prabowo supporters to besiege the KPU building and the Merdeka Palace. The Indonesian government stated it had foiled the attempted smuggling of silenced firearms, which Presidential Chief of Staff Moeldoko claimed were intended to be used to frame the government of employing snipers on the protesters.

In the early hours of 21 May 2019, one day ahead of the expected announcement date of 22 May, KPU officially announced the election result, with Jokowi winning 55.5% of the vote, consistent with quick count tallies. Shortly afterwards, Prabowo declared his rejection of the result and later stated his intention to bring the case to the Constitutional Court. Susilo Bambang Yudhoyono and Zulkifli Hasan, respectively leaders of Prabowo-supporting parties Demokrat and PAN, on the other hand, accepted the results and recognised Jokowi's victory.

=== Security preparations ===
Marines preparing for the 2019 Indonesian elections protests.

In anticipation of protests, some 45,000 armed police were deployed to guard the KPU and the General Election Supervisory Agency (Bawaslu) offices in Central Jakarta. Members of the Mobile Brigade Corps (Brimob) with rifles and armoured personnel carrier were also deployed. Police and TNI members numbering 34,000 were deployed at KPU, and a police spokesman noted they were not armed with firearms; they instead employed riot gear, tear gas and water cannons. He also noted that Polri had communicated with some field coordinators of the protesters to reduce the number of participants. Barbed wire was installed on the road leading to the Bawaslu building in order to allow Polri personnel to manage the crowds.

The U.S. embassy and Singaporean embassy in Jakarta issued security notices warning their citizens to avoid the protests. Ahead of the protests, Polri put Jakarta at Siaga 1, the highest security alert, for the period between 21 and 25 May.

== Events ==
=== 21 May ===
Protesters were not allowed to hold the rally immediately in front of the Bawaslu building. The protest remained mostly peaceful, and the protesters and police broke fast in front of Bawaslu together. Nominally, protests had to be concluded by 18:00 local time per regional regulations, but after negotiations, the protest was allowed to continue until past Tarawih prayers, and the protesters at Bawaslu began to disband around 21:00. After leaving the protest site, the mass of protesters moved towards the Wahid Hasyim street leading to Menteng and Tanah Abang.

However, by 21:30, another mass had formed in front of Bawaslu, which did not disperse until around 22:45. According to official reports, a mob of protesters attempted to force their way into the Bawaslu office at around 11 PM, but the Army and the Police drove the mob to Tanah Abang to be disbanded. There, the police were attacked by a mob with fireworks and stones, while police used tear gas. The mob had also set fire to trash and wood pieces, which the police extinguished with water cannons. At least 100 protesters were taken into custody by the police. Police statements noted that the mob – which clashed with police until early on 22 May – was not the Bawaslu protesters.

=== 22 May ===
Early on 22 May, a group of unidentified individuals burned down cars parked in front of a Brimob dormitory in KS Tubun road of Petamburan, Tanah Abang. There were no casualties from the event. Police officers deployed water cannons and tear gas to disperse the mob, which was at the location. The group was then reported to have dispersed into nearby residential areas. The streets leading to the location were then closed off by police.

Later on the day, the mass of protesters returned to the Bawaslu building, which had its perimeter barbed wire damaged in the previous day's protests and replaced. Another crowd also gathered at the Sarinah intersection, where they were contained by riot police. A McDonald's restaurant was damaged by protesters. Protests and light clashes also occurred in the Slipi area (in Palmerah, West Jakarta), where stone-throwing and tire-burning occurred. Some of the protesters claimed to have discovered hollow-point bullets in police vehicles, a claim which the police denied. On the other hand, the police reported having confiscated envelopes of money from arrested protesters, a claim which the opposition leaders denied. Separately, a Gerindra-labelled ambulance was held by the police following a riot, which stated that the Tasikmalaya-origin ambulance had carried stones and envelopes of money.

Authorities announced on 22 May that the sending of images and videos via social media applications, such as WhatsApp, would be restricted temporarily to prevent the spread of hoaxes and provocative content.

Riots continued in the night, with one fire truck being hijacked by a mob and its crew coerced to spray the anti-riot police. A rioting mob in Slipi, Palmerah was encountered by Indonesian Marine Corps troops, who negotiated with the group. The following day, Prabowo called on his supporters to "go home, rest and put their trust in the law", stating his intent to contest the election results.

== Casualties ==
Governor of Jakarta Anies Baswedan stated that six people had been killed and 200 were injured as a result of the protests and rioting as of 09:00 on 22 May. One man was shot in the chest and brought to a hospital, but died there. A hospital which received injured protesters noted that "more than one" of their 17 patients had bullet wounds, with one needing surgery. Baswedan updated the statement on 23 May, saying that there were eight killed in the protests. In addition, over 600 were reported as injured in varying degrees. Australia's ABC dubbed the events as "Indonesia's worst political violence in two decades".

== Reactions ==
Jokowi announced in an official address on 22 May that "there would be no room for rioters who ravage the country", and that TNI and Polri would act under existing regulations. Around the same time, Prabowo also gave an address, calling for the authorities and his supporters not to use physical force. Prior to the events, Prabowo had remarked that any rioters would not be his supporters. Governor Baswedan requested for people not to share unverified information. Wiranto, the Indonesian Coordinating Minister for Political, Legal and Security Affairs, declared that "paid thugs" instigated the rioting and claimed that the government was aware of the "mastermind" of the events.

The Tanah Abang textile market, the largest such market in Southeast Asia, was temporarily closed due to access towards the location being blocked by the riots. The exchange rate for the Indonesian Rupiah dropped due to political concerns. TransJakarta suspended 14 of its routes passing through the Tanah Abang area due to the unconducive situation. In Surabaya, mayor Tri Rismaharini instructed that pupils be given a day off school on 22 May partly due to safety concerns from parents.

== Censorship ==
In the months leading up to the election, communications minister Rudiantara criticised Facebook for "not being collaborative" with regards to the "removal of content" from its services, including Instagram. As the demonstrations began, security minister Wiranto made good on his promise that "authorities would restrict access to social media". As the demonstrations were underway, Indonesian citizens were restricted from using WhatsApp, Facebook and Instagram to communicate with one another. Eyewitness reports with several Indonesian citizens confirmed outages for the use of Indonesia's primary digital communications technology, WhatsApp, which was blocked for several days, with a curfew, as far as Singaraja, Bali, some 957 kilometres away. During this time, some Indonesians began to use VPNs to circumvent restrictions on speech, leading to communications minister Rudiantara instructing Indonesians to "uninstall" VPNs less than a week after the demonstrations started.
