= K. M. A. Usop =

Indonesian politician (1936–2015)

Kenna Muhammad Aini Usop (5 July 1936 – 16 August 2015) was an Indonesian academic, politician, Dayak cultural figure, and former political prisoner during the early Reformasi era. He was famous for being accused as a provocator encouraging native Dayaks to kill Madurese migrants in Central Kalimantan, igniting the communal Sampit conflict in 2001. As a result, he was arrested and prevented from leaving the city of Palangka Raya, making him a city prisoner.

Previously, he wrote several books advocating Dayak regionalism and arguing why Dayaks should dominate all of Kalimantan provinces politically and economically. After being released from detention, he became a representative on the Regional Representative Council representing Central Kalimantan between 2004 and 2009.

He died on 16 August 2015 after suffering from deteriorating health. He was buried in Palangka Raya and his funeral prayer was attended by many people from Central Kalimantan.
