= Sambas riots =

1999 ethnic violence in Indonesia

- Part of post-Suharto era
- Location of the regency (kabupaten) within the province of West Kalimantan on the island of Borneo.
- Location: Sambas Regency, West Kalimantan, Indonesia
- Date: 1999
- Deaths: 200–1,000 (overwhelming Madurese)

The Sambas riots were an outbreak of inter-ethnic violence in Indonesia in 1999 in the regency of Sambas, West Kalimantan province and involved the Madurese on one side and an alliance of the indigenous Dayak people and Sambas Malays on the other.

== Background ==
The Sambas riots in 1999 were not an isolated incident, as there had been previous incidents of violence between the Dayaks and the Madurese. The last major conflict, the Sanggau Ledo riots, occurred between December 1996 and January 1997, and resulted in more than 600 deaths. The Madurese first arrived in Borneo in 1930 under the transmigration program initiated by the Dutch colonial administration, and continued by the Indonesian government.

== Massacres ==
After a Madurese mob massacred Malays in Parit Setia while they were exiting the local mosque after performing the Muslim Eid al-Fitr prayer, Malay mobs began large anti-Madurese riots. Later, Dayak mobs joined forces with the Malay. The Indonesian government did little to stop the violence. Some of the Indonesian soldiers that were sent to quell the riots were attacked by the Sambas Malays and Dayaks.

== Aftermath ==
=== Fatalities ===
Death toll estimates for Sambas riots
Deaths	Author(s)	Year
416 (Note: Including 401 Madurese, 14 Malays, and 1 Dayak.)	Sambas Regency government	1999
489 (Note: Along with 168 serious injuries.)	Department of Defense (Note: Has since been renamed to the Ministry of Defense.)	2002
200–500 (Note: Only including Madurese.)	UNDP, Bappenas, and PSPK-UGM	2007
3000 minimum (Note: Only including Madurese.)	Harsono, et al. (Note: In the "Seruan Pontianak" (Pontianak Appeal), an article signed by 77 specialists in West Kalimantan issues.)	2009
481	Tadjoeddin (Note: Using the UNSFIR conflict database.)	2014
390	Sukandar et al. (Note: Using data from the National Violence Monitoring System.)	2015

Estimates of the death toll during the riots vary widely, usually ranging from 200 to 2,000 deaths. Exact counts are difficult due to many of the bodies being mutilated and cannibalized. The Madurese constituted the vast majority of the victims, with most being decapitated.

The official estimates range from close to 200 to almost 500 deaths. A police report in April 1999 recorded 177 deaths, along with 77 serious injuries. The Sambas Regency government estimated the number of deaths at 416, including 401 Madurese, 14 Malays, and 1 Dayak. Another official death toll released put the number of deaths at 186, including 154 Madurese. Later, the Indonesian Department of Defense estimated 489 deaths, as well as 169 people who were severely injured.

Many scholars also put the likely range at around 200 to 500. Gerry van Klinken estimated at least 186 deaths, based on the official death toll, while saying that it could potentially be much higher, although fewer than 500. A report by the United Nations Development Programme, the Ministry of National Development Planning, and Gadjah Mada University's Centre for Rural and Regional Development Studies also estimated around 200 to 500 Madurese deaths.

Some scholars estimate higher numbers. Zaenuddin Hudi Prasojo and Ach Tijani estimated around 1,000 deaths. At the high end, the Pontianak Appeal, which was signed by 77 specialists in West Kalimantan issues, said there were more than 3,000 Madurese deaths.

=== Further massacres ===
In 2001, another conflict broke out between the Madurese and Dayak that resulted in hundreds of deaths. It became known as the Sampit conflict.

== See also ==
- Cannibalism in Asia § Sumatra and Borneo
- Fall of Suharto
- Sampit conflict
- Sanggau Ledo riots
- Tarakan riot
