= Timo Kivimäki =

Finnish academic

Timo Antero Kivimäki is a professor of International Relations and Director of Research at University of Bath, United Kingdom who in 2012 was convicted and sentenced to 5 months in prison for spying against Denmark on behalf of Russia.

== Positions ==
Timo Kivimäki is the chairman of the board for Calx Proclivia, a Finnish conflict resolution consulting company. Previously Dr. Kivimäki has held full professorships at the University of Helsinki in the Department of Political and Economic Studies, the University of Copenhagen and the University of Lapland and he has been Director of the Institute of Development Studies at the University of Helsinki and the Nordic Institute of Asian Studies in Copenhagen.

== Research ==
Kivimäki's research focus is on peace and conflicts. His main theoretical contribution in that field is in the development of the neo-pragmatic peace research approach, in which knowledge produced serves practical peace activities and creates social realities useful for peace (Kivimäki 2012a). Recently Kivimäki's contribution to peace research scholarship has been focused on the creation of an understanding of the relative peace in East Asia (Kivimäki 2012bc: Kivimäki 2011ab). Kivimäki's scholarship has also tried to explain the contribution to peace and democracy of forceful democracy-promotion (Kivimäki 2012d; 2011c).

== Peace work ==
In addition to academic work, Professor Kivimäki has been actively involved in practical peace work, advising parties to peace processes, building capacity to peace negotiation and supporting peace dialogue with academic seminars and research activities. According to a report by the Finnish Embassy, Kivimäki, along with local professor Dr. Syarif I. Alqadrie, was the engine of the West Kalimantan peace process which was taken over by the Vice President of Indonesia in 2008. A report by the Nordic Institute of Asian Studies reveals that this process managed to calm down local election campaigns and prevent escalation in conflict-prone situations. In the Aceh Peace Negotiations, Kivimäki acted as an adviser to the mediator, Nobel Peace Prize Laureate, President Martti Ahtisaari. According to Ahtisaari, Kivimäki's role in the process was vitally important.

=== Espionage conviction and controversy ===
In addition to his work in Indonesian peace processes, Kivimäki has worked on various contracts in the assistance of foreign ministries of Finland, Denmark, Sweden, Netherlands and Russia. Furthermore, he has worked with EU and UN organizations and several other donor agencies and non-government organizations (NGOs) to promote strategies of conflict prevention and peace dialogue. In October 2004, he was “strongly advised” by a Danish intelligence official either to stop his meetings with the Aceh rebel organization, or if he continued meetings, he would have to provide reports on them to the Danish Security and Intelligence Service. Kivimäki declined and continued his meetings (according to an interview with a Malaysian diplomat, who had heard about the demand from Kivimäki in summer 2005).

In September 2010 Kivimäki was arrested on suspicion of helping a Russian espionage organization and he was in May 2012 convicted to 5 month in prison for providing list of names of students and information on colleagues to employees at the Russian embassy in Denmark. Kivimäki did not appeal. He was convicted in accordance § 108 in the Danish penal code, for assisting/enabling foreign intelligence agencies to operate in Denmark. The proceedings in court was closed to the public as it involved national interest and foreign powers. After the sentence Kivimäki was fired from his position at the University of Copenhagen and he served two and a half month in home arrest in autumn 2012.

After his sentence Kivimäki has tried to stir controversy over his conviction in the Danish court. According to Kivimäki himself, his work with the Russian foreign ministry was similar to his work with other ministries, and the diplomats he worked with were not spies. His work for the Russian foreign ministry consisted of short studies that explored research-based support for Russian diplomatic arguments against militaristic counter-terrorism of the United States and its allies (including Denmark), military interventions in Iraq, and potential intervention in Iran. According to himself Kivimäki had refused to help the Russians in their arguments in the negotiation on the territorial disputes in the Arctic. However, Kivimäki offered to organize scholarly seminars on the topic in order to help the initiation of political negotiation on the topic. He did, on the other hand, admit to receiving cash payments (120,000 Danish kroner) in envelopes from the Russian Embassy employees.

The district court in Glostrup, Denmark, concluded in its public version of the verdict that the information that Kivimäki delivered in his discussions with diplomats, if passed to the Russian intelligence organization, could have helped the intelligence organization. Thus, the court convicted Kivimäki under paragraph 108 of the Danish criminal code. Kivimäki himself has used this to claim that the sentence show that he was dealing with diplomats rather than foreign agents. However, the sentence only reflected the fact that the persons he was dealing with was employed as diplomats at the Russian embassy. After the affair Denmark and Russia agreed that four diplomats from the Russian Embassy had to be re-called back to Moscow and the matter was not pursued further between the two states.

His sentence was discussed publicly in both Denmark and Finland and some did find it controversial as it was seen to put restrictions on the interactions between scholars and employees from foreign embassies.

=== Further activities ===
After his sentence in Denmark, Kivimäki moved back to Finland and took up a faculty position at the University of Helsinki. He published a book examining the relationship between academic research and peace work (Kivimäki 2012a) in which he touches on the subject of how intelligence communities can block or support peace processes. Since moving to Finland his activities have been focused on purely academic issues. He is teaching and further developing the theory of pragmatic peace research, giving a new generation of peace activists new ideas on how to help the crucial initial phase of dialogue between conflicting parties. He is also a frequent commentator on issues related to peace and conflict in the Finnish media. His book is entitled The Long Peace of East Asia.

== Selected publications ==
- Kivimaki, Timo (2016a). Paradigms of Peace: A Pragmatist Introduction to the Contribution to Peace of Paradigms of Social Science. Imperial College Press.
- Kivimaki, Timo (2016b). Legalism, Developmentalism and Securitization: The Case of Territorial Disputes in the South China Sea. In: Fels, E. and Vu, T.-M., eds. Power Politics in Asia’s Contested Waters. Springer, pp. 57–76.
- Kivimaki, Timo (2016c). Politics of economic relations between China and Myanmar. In: Kim, Y.-C., ed. Chinese Global Production Networks in ASEAN 2016. Switzerland: Springer International Publishing AG, pp. 137–155.
- Kivimaki, Timo (2015). “Regional Cooperation and Joint Development: Speech That Acts And Action That Speaks”, in, eds., Ashgate, Farnham, 2014.: Speech That Acts And Action That Speaks. In: Wu, S. and Zou, K., eds. Non-Traditional Security Issues and the South China Sea:. Farnham: Ashgate, pp. 17–31.
- Kivimäki, Timo (2014). Long Peace of East Asia. Routledge.
- Kivimäki, Timo (2012a). Can Peace Research Make Peace. Lessons in Academic Diplomacy. Ashgate, Adlershot.
- Kivimäki, Timo (2012b). “Sovereignty, hegemony, and peace in Western Europe and in East Asia.
- Kivimäki, Timo (2012c). “The ASEAN Charter and the De-Securitization of Interstate Disputes in Southeast Asia” Asian Security 7(2).
- Kivimäki, Timo (2012d). “Democracy, Autocrats and U.S. Policies In the Middle East”, Middle East Policy, Vol. XIX, No. 1, Spring, pp. 64–71.
- Kivimäki, Timo (2011a). “East Asian relative peace and the ASEAN Way” International Relations of the Asia Pacific Vol 11, 2011b, 57–85.
- Kivimäki, Timo (2011b). Security and Peace in East Asia and the Asia-Pacific. Asian Security, July.
- Kivimäki, Timo (2011c). What Price Democracy? How the West Could Learn From East Asia. Global Asia, December 2011.
- Kivimäki, Timo; Väyrynen, Paavo, eds. (1997). Kansainvälinen yhteistyö Pohjois-Kalotilla. University of Lapland. ISBN 951-634-589-1.
