= 2010 Tarakan riot =

2010 Indonesian ethnic riot

The Tarakan riot was an ethnic riot which occurred between September 27 and September 29, 2010 in the city of Tarakan, East Kalimantan (now part of North Kalimantan), Indonesia. The riot pitched native Tidung people against Bugis migrants. It was triggered by the death of a Tidung elder in a scuffle with a youth gang. During the ensuing riot four people were killed and thousands of civilians were displaced, before a peace agreement was made between the communities.

== Background ==
Tarakan, located on Tarakan Island, is one of the major cities in eastern Borneo (now Northern Borneo). It had a population of 178,111 in 2008. Native residents are the Tidung, a subgroup of the Dayak people. The city also has a multi-ethnic population from other parts of Indonesia, such as Bugis, Javanese and Chinese Indonesians.

The Tidung are a group of Malayised Dayak people who live in the north-eastern part of Borneo and surrounding small islands. They live on both sides of the border of Malaysia and Indonesia. They are closely related to other native people in Sabah and East Kalimantan, such as the Murut people. Tidung speak Tidong language, one of the North Bornean languages.

The Bugis have been migrating from their homeland in South Sulawesi since the fall of Makassar to the Dutch East India Company in 1669. They had settled in parts of maritime Southeast Asia, especially eastern Borneo, but also as far away from Irian to the Malay Peninsula and Sumatra.

Both ethnic groups are predominantly Muslim and relations among them are generally peaceful. However, the economic situation caused discontent between natives and migrants, who are perceived to be advantaged.

== The riots ==
The riot was not directly triggered as an ethnic conflict, but began as a criminal act. On midnight of Monday, September 27, Abdullah, a 50-year-old elder from the Tidung tribe, was killed in a scuffle with a group of young men, who were from the Bugis tribe. Abdullah was beaten to death by the gang after a quarrel about money. His son, Abdur Rahman was injured in the scuffle.

The incident infuriated local Tidung people, who took to the street to protest and began searching for the perpetrator. In the early morning of September 27, 50 armed Tidungs began searching youth gang members involved in the incidents. This created tension with the Bugis. An attempt to mediate the dispute in the late night of Monday, September 27 failed because leading ethnic figures were already massed on the field.

On Tuesday, September 28, Police finally captured two of the youth gang members involved in Abdullah's death, but tension had already escalated and civilians fled into refugee camps.

During a second day of tension, the night of Tuesday, September 28, a deadly clash finally occurred between hundreds of people from both ethnic groups. Hundreds of properties were burned and two people were killed.

On the third day, in early morning of Wednesday, September 29, another clash occurred and two more people were killed, bringing the total death casualties during the riot to four people.

== Casualties and effects ==
In addition to Abdullah, killed by the youth gang, another four people were killed in the ensuing clashes. Six others were injured, suffering slash wounds to their hands and legs. Rising tension and violence caused fear among both ethnic groups. As many as 32,000 people were displaced during the conflict. The refugees mostly took shelter in military and government buildings, such as schools. In addition to casualties, shops and properties were burned by the rioters, while many other were closed.

== Responses ==
Following clashes, a call for peace was made by the government and public in Indonesia. The Head of the Tarakan Ulama Council, Syamsi Sarman called for peace and visited victims' families to express condolences. He also called for police to swiftly stop the violence and control the masses.

The President of Indonesia, Susilo Bambang Yudhoyono urged all parties to work together comprehensively to settle the inter-community dispute. He was also especially concerned that the riot might develop into a bloodbath like the Sampit conflict in 2001, one of the bloodiest conflicts during Indonesia's transition to democracy.

Minister of Interior Gamawan Fauzi tried to calm the masses by reminding them that the riot was originally an ordinary criminal incident, which accidentally involved two different ethnic groups. He also expressed dismay that violence was still used to solve local problems.

Calls for peace also came from South Sulawesi province, homeland of the Bugis. The South Sulawesi Families Association called for the Bugis-Makassar and Tarakan groups to make peace following the clash. South Sulawesi Governor Syahrul Yasin Limpo had spoken with the East Kalimantan Governor Awang Faroek Ishak to inquire about the situation, and called for peace negotiations.

To anticipate a bigger clash, the Tarakan Police requested reinforcement to handle the riot. Two battalions, one each from the Police’s Mobile Brigade and the Indonesian Military were deployed to control the masses.

During the clashes, Tarakan port was closed to prevent people from mainland Kalimantan coming to Tarakan Island; effectively stopping outside groups from increasing tension in the community.

The police finally captured the suspect and the government managed to hold peace negotiations to end the conflict. Law enforcement performance was criticized during the riot, with observers noting that the clashes would have ended sooner had the police and military responded more promptly. Police were also criticized for their management of the conflict, only securing the original scuffle area and failing to handle congregating groups in other places.

== Peace agreements ==
The peace treaty between the groups reached agreement on both sides on Wednesday, September 29. The negotiations were held in Juwata Airport in Tarakan. The peace was facilitated by the Government, especially East Kalimantan Governor Awang Faroek and concluded by representatives of both Tidung and Bugis people. Under the peace accord, the two ethnic groups agreed to jointly hold an Idul Fitri celebration (usually a holiday that marks the end of Ramadan). They called on the police to take perpetrators of the rioting to court and appealed to all to respect local traditions. Both groups agreed to forgive each other and cease all violence. After signing the agreement, both groups handed over their weapons to the police.

Conditions were almost back to normal on Thursday, September 30 when banks, markets and shops reopened and residents returned from refugee camps. During the normalization period, Tarakan remained on alert for two more weeks.
