= Kivlan Zen =

Indonesian former military officer (born 1946)

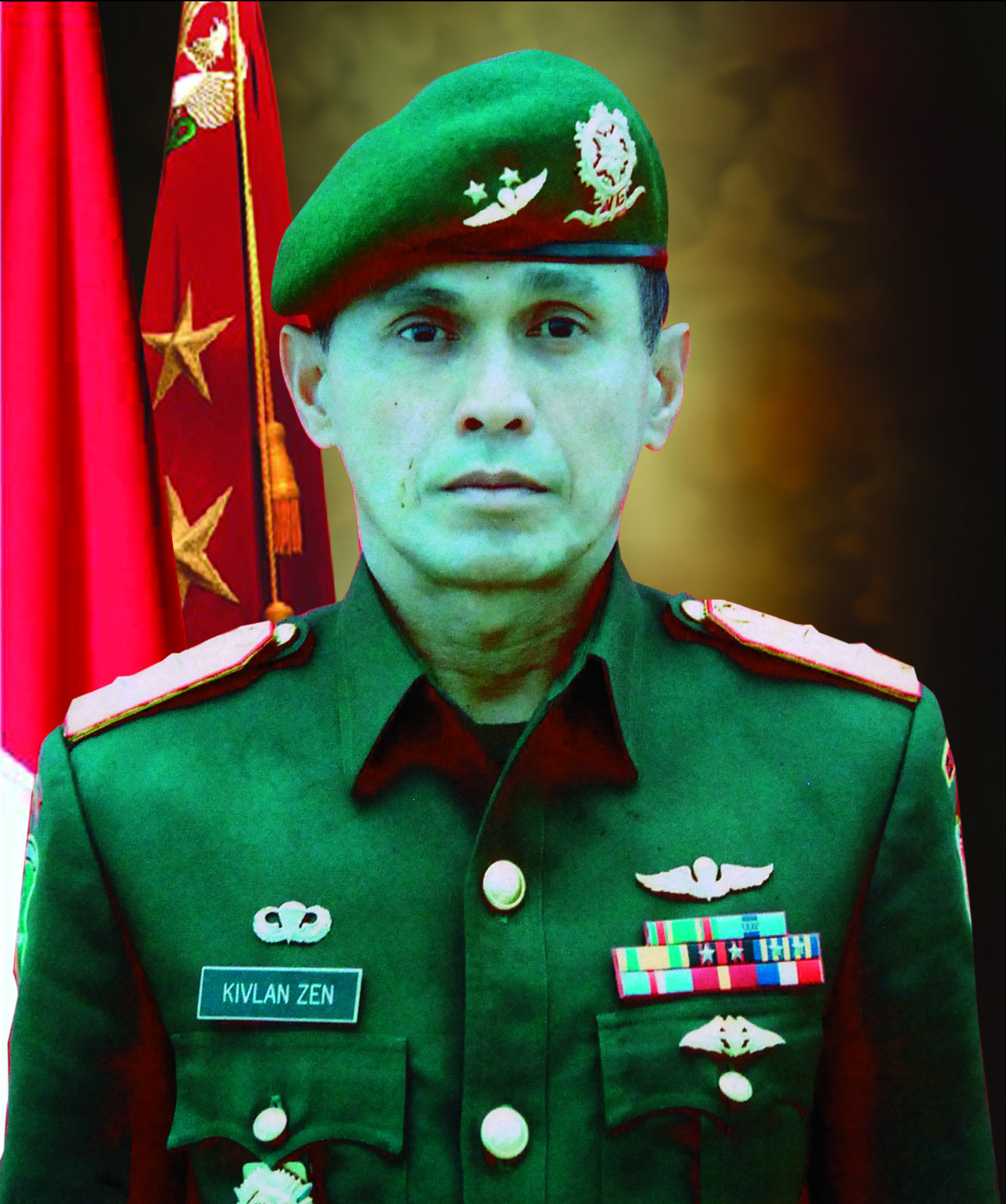
- Born: December 24, 1946 (age 79); Langsa, Aceh, Indonesia
- Education: Indonesian Military Academy (Akmil) 1971
- Military career
- Allegiance: Indonesia
- Branch: Indonesian Army
- Service years: 1971 – 2001
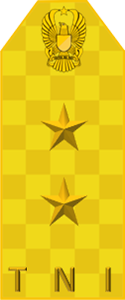
- Rank: Major General
- Unit: Infantry
- Conflicts: Mapenduma hostage crisis
- Awards: Bintang Yudha Dharma Nararya Medals

Major General (Ret.) Kivlan Zen is an Indonesian former military officer who was the chief of staff of KOSTRAD (Army Strategic Command). He led the XVII Garuda Contingent on 1990 in the Philippines. He served as an aide to Prabowo Subianto, the former commander of Kopassus.

== Early life ==
Kivlan Zen born on December 24, 1946, in Langsa, Aceh. He is the alumni of Akmil (Military Academy) in 1971.
