= 2019 in Indonesia =

- Centuries: 19th; 20th; 21st
- Decades: 1990s; 2000s; 2010s; 2020s
- See also: History of Indonesia; Timeline of Indonesian history; List of years in Indonesia

2019 (MMXIX) was a common year starting on Tuesday of the Gregorian calendar, the 2019th year of the Common Era (CE) and Anno Domini (AD) designations, the 19th year of the 3rd millennium and the 21st century, and the 10th and last year of the 2010s decade.

The year was declared as a major political year, as Indonesia held the 2019 Indonesian general election, in which Indonesians would choose whether to re-elect President Joko Widodo or to elect a new president. Subsequently, President Joko Widodo was re-elected as the 7th President of Indonesia, with his new vice president, Ma'ruf Amin. Indonesians also elected another hundreds of members of People's Consultative Assembly (MPR), and members of local legislative bodies, making it one of the largest single-day election in the world.

The year was also marked by protests and riots, led by government opposition and Indonesian students. The 22 May riot in Jakarta occurred after supporters of Prabowo Subianto rejected the result of the election. In August, riots erupted across Papua after an alleged racist incident in Surabaya, causing more than 30 deaths in one of the most serious protests in Papua. In September, thousands of students rallied against the government's decision to pass a new controversial penal code.

== Incumbents (Note: Listed government officials are officials who have been selected after the 2019 Indonesian general election.) ==
=== President and Vice President ===
President	Vice President
Joko Widodo	Ma'ruf Amin

=== Ministers and Coordinating Ministers ===
==== Coordinating Ministers ====
Photo	Position	Name
	Coordinating Minister of Political, Legal, and Security Affairs	Mahfud MD
	Coordinating Minister of Economic Affairs	Airlangga Hartarto
	Coordinating Minister of Maritime Affairs and Investment	Luhut Binsar Pandjaitan
	Coordinating Minister of Human Development and Culture	Muhadjir Effendy

==== Ministers ====
Photo	Position	Name
	Minister of State Secretariat	Pratikno
	Minister of Home Affairs	Tito Karnavian
	Minister of Foreign Affairs	Retno Marsudi
	Minister of Defence	Prabowo Subianto
	Minister of Law and Human Rights	Yasonna Laoly
	Minister of Finance	Sri Mulyani
	Minister of Energy and Mineral Resources	Arifin Tasrif
	Minister of Industry	Agus Gumiwang Kartasasmita
	Minister of Trade	Agus Suparmanto
	Minister of Agriculture	Syahrul Yasin Limpo
	Minister of Environment and Forestry	Siti Nurbaya Bakar
	Minister of Transportation	Budi Karya Sumadi
	Minister of Marine Affairs and Fisheries	Edhy Prabowo
	Minister of Manpower	Ida Fauziyah
	Minister of Public Works and Public Housing	Basuki Hadimuljono
	Minister of Health	Terawan Agus Putranto
	Minister of Education and Culture	Nadiem Makarim
	Minister of Agrarian Affairs and Spatial Planning	Sofyan Djalil
	Minister of Social Affairs	Juliari Batubara
	Minister of Religious Affairs	Fachrul Razi
	Minister of Communication and Information Technology	Johnny G. Plate
	Minister of Research and Technology	Bambang Brodjonegoro
	Minister of Cooperatives and Small & Medium Enterprises	Teten Masduki
	Minister of Women's Empowerment and Child Protection	I Gusti Ayu Bintang Darmawati
	Minister of Administrative and Bureaucratic Reform	Tjahjo Kumolo
	Minister of Villages, Development of Disadvantaged Regions and Transmigration	Abdul Halim Iskandar
	Minister of National Development Planning	Suharso Monoarfa
	Minister of State-Owned Enterprises	Erick Thohir
	Minister of Tourism and Creative Economy	Wishnutama
	Minister of Youth and Sports	Zainudin Amali

== Events ==
=== January ===
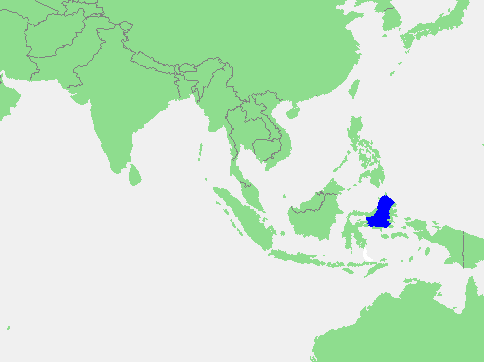
January 6, 2019. A magnitude 6.6 earthquake struck Molucca Sea.

- January 4 - A magnitude 5.6 earthquake struck Banda Sea, 189 km north-northwest of Saumlaki, Maluku at a depth of 117.7 km. There were no immediate reports of casualties or damage.
- January 5 - Two Indonesian celebrities were arrested for their suspected involvement in online prostitution. The duo were arrested in separate rooms at a Surabaya hotel.
- January 6 - A magnitude 6.6 earthquake struck Molucca Sea, 151 km west-northwest of Tobelo, North Maluku at a depth of 60.0 km. There were no immediate reports of casualties or damage.
- January 9 - Corruption Eradication Commission (KPK) leaders Agus Raharjo and Laode M. Syarif faced terror threats with unknown assailants placing what appeared to be bombs at their houses. It was suspected that a Molotov cocktail exploded at Laode's house.
- January 11 - Hundreds of houses were damaged by tornado in Rancaekek, Bandung, West Java. Two people were seriously injured and around 100 people suffered minor injuries.
- January 13 - Indonesian Women single in Badminton, Fitriani won the 2019 Thailand Masters (badminton) Super 300. The 2019 Thailand Masters, officially Princess Sirivannavari Thailand Masters 2019 was a badminton tournament which took place at Indoor Stadium Huamark in Thailand from 8 to 13 January 2019 and had a total purse of $150,000. The 2019 Thailand Masters was the first tournament of the 2019 BWF World Tour and also part of the Thailand Masters championships which had been held since 2016. This tournament was organized by the Badminton Association of Thailand with sanction from the BWF.
- January 14
  - Indonesian Navy divers have found the cockpit voice recorder (CVR) from Lion Air Flight 610 in Java Sea.
  - Two Indonesian fighter jets forced an Ethiopian Airlines cargo plane to land over airspace breach. The plane was forced to land at an airport at Batam Island. The cargo plane ETH 3728 was flying from Addis Ababa to Hong Kong.
- January 17
  - A plastic-waste mill worker was found dead inside a milling machine at his workplace in Bantargebang, Bekasi.
  - First Indonesian Presidential debate between Joko Widodo and Prabowo Subianto. The topics covered were on the issues of corruption, terrorism, human rights and the law.
- January 18 - Mosaic art surrounding a statue on a major road in Surakarta, Central Java, has drawn ire from conservative Muslim groups, which have said that an aerial view of the art showed that the design resembled a Christian cross.
- January 19 - A boat carrying 24 people sank in Kapuas River, West Kalimantan. At least 13 people were killed and 11 people survived.
- January 21 - A tornado struck Tuban, East Java. One person was killed and 42 houses were damaged.
- January 22
  - South Sulawesi floods and Landslides - Floods and landslides in several regions in South Sulawesi killed 78 people and left dozens missing.
  - Sumba Island Earthquake - an earthquake magnitude 6.0 struck Sumba Island and a few hours later a second earthquake magnitude 6.4 struck the same place. There were no immediate reports of damage or casualties.
- January 24
  - Basuki Tjahaja Purnama was released from jail after two years imprisonment on blasphemy charges.
  - Sukoharjo Tornado - Dozens of houses were damaged by a tornado in Sukoharjo, Central Java. Several people were injured.
- January 25 - Russian climber was found injured on the slopes of Mount Agung in Bali, 10 hours after he was declared missing.
- January 26 - Three houses and one hospital were damaged after a magnitude 5.8 earthquake struck Aru Islands, Maluku. One girl was injured.
- January 27
- Batang and Pekalongan Floods - Floods swept through houses in Batang and Pekalongan, Central Java. Thousands of people were evacuated in two districts.
  - Bali Landslide - two people were killed and 12 injured from a landslide in Karangasem, Bali.
    - Indonesian Men Doubles pair in Badminton, Marcus Fernaldi Gideon and Kevin Sanjaya Sukamuljo won The 2019 Indonesia Masters, officially the DAIHATSU Indonesia Masters 2019, was a badminton tournament that took place at the Istora Gelora Bung Karno in Indonesia from 22 to 27 January 2019 and had a total purse of $350,000. The 2019 Indonesia Masters was the third tournament of the 2019 BWF World Tour and also part of the Indonesian Masters championships which had been held since 2010. This tournament was organized by the Badminton Association of Indonesia with sanction from the BWF. This international tournament was held at the Istora Gelora Bung Karno in Jakarta, Indonesia.
- January 28
  - Ahmad Dhani was sentenced to 18 months in jail for spreading hatred on social media.
  - Seven people were killed and 26 injured when a bus crashed on Cipularang highway.
- January 29
  - Bali Landslide - Four people were killed when a landslide buried a house in Buleleng, Bali.
  - West Halmahera Landslide - dozens of houses were damaged after landslide hit West Halmahera, North Maluku.
- January 31 - the flood hit dozens of houses in Surabaya. One person killed.

=== February ===
- February 1 - Manado Floods and landslides - floods and landslides in several regions in Manado, North Sulawesi killed four people.
- February 2 - A M_{w} 6.1 earthquake struck Mentawai Islands - West Sumatra. Eleven houses were destroyed, a church and a health center were damaged.
- February 3 - KPK investigators were attacked while on duty by unknown assailants in Hotel Borobudur, Central Jakarta.
- February 4 - Aldama Putra Pongkala, a student in an aviation academy in Makassar, was tortured and beaten to death by a senior.
- February 5 - The Samudera Bhakti Temple in Bandung caught on fire during Chinese New Year celebrations. No casualties in the incident.
- February 6 - At least two people died and 12 others were injured after a bus plunged from a cliff in Cicalengka, Bandung.
- February 8 - Two people died and two others hospitalized after eating pufferfish in Probolinggo.
- February 10 - Three people were killed and several houses were damaged after the dam on the Cinambo River, Bandung burst.
- February 14 - Two boys were killed and others injured following an apparent grenade explosion in Cibungbulang village, Bogor.
- February 15
  - Princess Mikhaelia Audrey Megonondo of Jambi won the Miss Indonesia 2019 competition, she will represent Indonesia in Miss World 2019 in Thailand this year. The Finale coronation night of Miss Indonesia 2019 was attended by the reigning Miss World 2018, Silvia Vanessa Ponce De León Sánchez of Mexico.
  - Four people were killed while four others were injured after a landslide struck Ciomas district in Bogor.
- February 16 - A Lion Air passenger plane with 189 people on board skidded off a runway in Supadio International Airport, Pontianak as the pilot tried to land it during heavy rain.
- February 17 - Second Indonesian presidential debate between Joko Widodo and Prabowo Subianto, covering infrastructure, energy, agriculture, food, and environment.
- February 26 - At least 29 people were killed in Bolaang Mongondow when an illegal gold mine collapsed.
- February 27 - Indonesia won 2019 AFF U-22 Youth Championship the tournament, after beating Thailand 2–1 in the final. The 2019 AFF U-22 Youth Championship (also known as the 2019 AFF U-22 Youth Championship for sponsorship reasons) was the 2nd edition of the AFF U-22 Youth Championship, organised by ASEAN Football Federation (AFF). The tournament was sponsored by Korean LG Corporation. The tournament was held from 17 to 26 February in Phnom Penh, Cambodia. This was its first as an under-22 tournament, with the previous edition an under-23 tournament. 2005 AFF U-23 Youth Championship winners Thailand were the defending champions, as there was no competition from 2006 to 2018, as the 2011 edition has been cancelled.

=== March ===
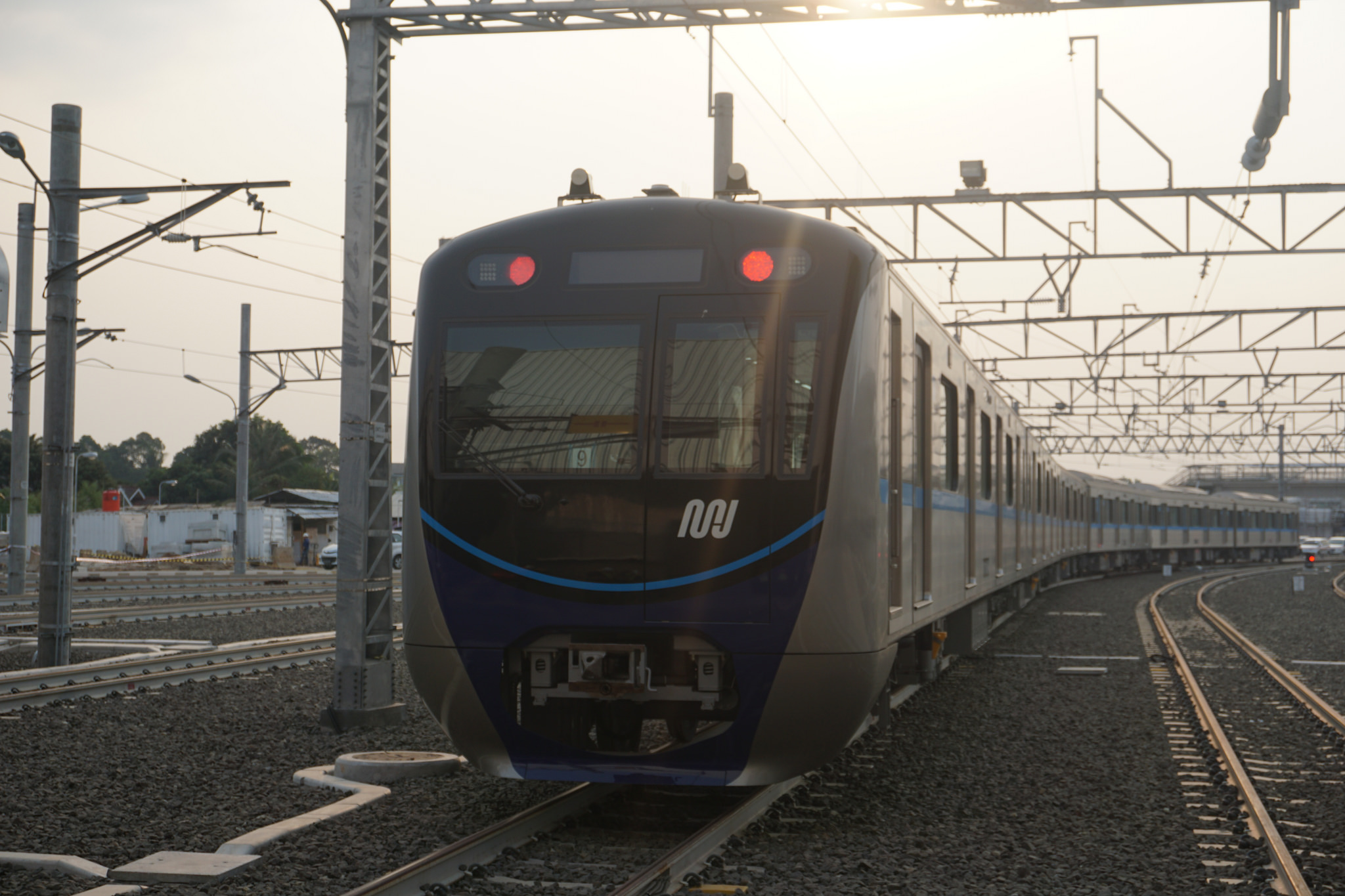
Jakarta Mass Rapid Transit officially opened for public by the current president of Indonesia, Joko Widodo.

- March 1 - Nearly 500 houses were damaged after a strong 5.3 magnitude earthquake struck South Solok Regency, West Sumatra. Damage was estimated to be as high as Rp25.6 billion rupiah.
- March 2 - KPK arrested the Regent of East Kutai Regency, Ismunandar, along with his wife, for an alleged bribery case.
- March 4 - Secretary General of Indonesia's Democrat Party Andi Arief was arrested for drug possession.
- March 6
  - Former President Commissioner of Lippo Group Eddy Sindoro was sentenced to 4 years in prison due to a high-level bribery case.
  - At least one person was killed and dozens of houses were damaged or destroyed after a tornado struck 2 villages in Probolinggo, East Java.
- March 7
  - A massive flood swept through 15 regencies in East Java, forcing the evacuation of thousands of residents.
  - KPK arrested at least 15 people, all of whom have connection with the Regent of East Kutai Regency, Ismunandar.
- March 10 - Indonesian Men Doubles pair in Badminton, Hendra Setiawan and Mohammad Ahsan won their second gold medal trophy of 2019 All England Open SUPER 1000 held in Arena Birmingham, Birmingham, England - United Kingdom.
- March 11 - At least 19 people were injured after an electrical pole fell onto a commuter line in Bogor, causing a derailment.
- March 12 - A bomb exploded at a crowded residential area in Sibolga, North Sumatra. At least 151 houses were damaged in the incident.
- March 15
  - Chairman of the Indonesian Islamic United Development Party (PPP), Romahurmuziy, was arrested by KPK in Surabaya for allegedly selling job positions in the Indonesian Ministry of Religious Affairs.
  - KPK also seized a $30,000 USD cash inside the drawer of the Indonesian Minister of Religious Affairs, Lukman Hakim Saifuddin.
- March 16 - At least 70 people were killed by a flash flood and a landslide in Jayapura Regency and Jayapura.
- March 17
  - Indonesian Men Doubles pair in Badminton, Fajar Alfian and Muhammad Rian Ardianto won the 2019 Swiss Open (badminton) SUPER 300.
  - At least 3 were killed and hundreds injured after a shallow 5.6 magnitude earthquake struck the island of Lombok
- March 18 - Jakarta Mass Rapid Transit is officially opened for public by the current president of Indonesia, Joko Widodo
- March 28 - Member of the Indonesian House of Representatives from Golkar Party Bowo Sidik Pangarso was arrested by KPK for the alleged corruption of Rp8 billion rupiah, which was to be used for conducting election fraud.
- March 31 - Honorary Member of National Mandate Party and activist Amien Rais was heavily criticized after his remark for promoting 'people power' if any indications of electoral fraud are found in the 2019 Indonesian general election.

=== April ===
- April 5 - Indonesian National Commission on Human Rights announced that the commission will start its investigation on possible severe human rights violations after the death of a rioter during the 2014 riot in Paniai, Papua.
- April 6 - Vice presidential candidate Sandiaga Uno in a new controversy row after he waved a flag of the Nadhlatul Ulama during his campaign in Lumajang, East Java.
- April 10 - MP Bowo Sidik Pangarso, who was arrested for suspicion on planning for an election fraud with Rp8 billion rupiah, revealed that he had received orders from a "certain minister" in the cabinet.
- April 11 - President Joko Widodo congratulated Gojek as the first decacorn in Indonesia.
- April 14 - Scandals and allegations of vote-rigging after authorities found that multiple ballots had been marked in favor of Joko Widodo and Ma’ruf in the presidential election and a National Democrat Party (NasDem) legislative candidate.
- April 17 – Indonesia held its 12th general election. For the first time, eligible voters will choose their representatives in all levels—governors and president, simultaneously.
- April 18
  - Even though no official result has been announced from the April 17 election, presidential candidate Prabowo Subianto declared himself as the winner of the election.
  - Dozens of people from Pusong Fish Auction stormed an Indonesian Navy building in Aceh. No one was killed in the incident but the building suffered significant damage.
- April 22 - Indonesian General Elections Commission (KPU) announced that at least 90 election workers had died and another 374 had fallen ill after the April 17 election. Overworking was cited as the main cause of most of the deaths.
- April 25
  - KPU stated that at least 225 election workers had died, most of whom died due to overwork.
  - Regent of South Lampung Regency, Zainudin Hasan, was sentenced to 12 years in prison due to corruption and money laundering charges.
- April 28 - Death toll from overwork during the April 17 election has risen to 287. More than 2,000 election workers had fallen ill.

=== May ===
- May 1
  - Indonesian KPU announced that at least 380 poll workers have died and more than 3,000 have been hospitalized due to overwork.
  - BNPB stated that at least 30 people were killed and 6 others were listed as missing after a massive flood and landslides struck Bengkulu.
- May 3
  - Mayor of Dumai, Zulkifli Adnan Singkah, was named by KPK as a suspect in the bribery case of former official in Ministry of Finance Yaya Purnowmo.
  - In response to the increasing number of deaths from overworked poll workers, the campaign team from presidential candidate Prabowo Subianto suggested to 'dig out' the graves of the poll workers for examination. The remark stirred controversy in the public.
- May 4 - KPU announced that a total of 440 poll workers had died from overwork.
- May 6 - Presidential candidate Prabowo Subianto asked the international media to report that the 2019 Indonesian general election was marred with frauds.
- May 7
  - President Joko Widodo travelled to Central Kalimantan to inspect a potential site for the future Indonesian capital.
  - Former leader of GPNF, Bachtiar Nasir, was named by the Indonesian National Police as a suspect on an alleged cash fraud.
- May 8
  - Presidential candidate Prabowo Subianto announced that he will defend his supporters who were recently arrested and convicted for numerous frauds case.
  - Indonesian police found two pipe bombs inside a handphone outlet in Bekasi, West Java.
- May 9
  - Deputy Speaker of the Indonesian Parliament, Fahri Hamzah, ordered the Indonesian police to probe the cause of the death of more than 400 poll workers.
  - Indonesian Police declared Eggi Sudjana, an influential and prominent Prabowo supporter, as a suspect in a possible 'sedition' case after a video purportedly showed him of "inviting people for people power".
- May 10 - Former member of the Indonesian Armed Forces Kivlan Zen was prohibited from leaving the country due to his connection on the sedition case.
- May 12 - Indonesian police arrested a man in Bogor who went viral after threatening to behead President Joko Widodo.
- May 14
  - Legislative candidate from the Indonesian Democratic Party of Struggle (PDIP), Dewi Tanjung, reported Amien Rais, Habib Rizieq and Bachtiar Nasir for a possible sedition due to their people power remarks.
  - Presidential candidate Prabowo Subianto refused to accept the result of the 2019 Indonesian general election, citing 'extraordinary-level of frauds'. Prabowo's campaign team claiming permanent fictitious voter lists, money politics, the use of voting machines, and ballot papers being broken up to being miscalculated on the KPU website as the problems.
  - Prabowo Subianto also asked KPU to stop the counting of the ballots. His campaign team urged the KPU's Vote Counting Information System (Situng) to be stopped.
- May 15 - Deputy Leader of the Indonesian Democratic Party Arief Poyuono asked the public to not pay taxes as a mean of protest to the incumbent Indonesian government, due to the allegations of 'massive election frauds' in the 2019 Indonesian election. His call was met with heavy criticism.
- May 17 - United States issued a travel warning for U.S citizens who were going to travel to Indonesia on 22 May due to security threats.
- May 18
  - Indonesian National Police arrested 29 terrorists who were suspected of planning to attack the Indonesian General Election Commission (KPU) building in Jakarta on 22 May.
  - Indonesian National Police advised the public to be aware of the potential of a terror attack on 22 May.
- May 20 - KPU announced that the vote counting process has been completed.
- May 21
  - At least 4 political parties declined to legitimize the result of the 2019 Indonesian general election due to allegations of fraud.
  - With a total vote of 85.607.362 (55%), Joko Widodo and Ma'ruf Amin was announced by the Indonesian General Elections Commission as the winner of the 2019 Indonesian general election.
- May 22 - Riots erupted in Jakarta as supporter of Prabowo Subianto refused to accept the result of the 2019 Indonesian general election.
- May 23 - Indonesian National Police set up an investigative team to probe the cause of the death of participants during the 22 May riots.
- May 24 - Presidential candidate Prabowo Subianto formally filed complaint to the Indonesian constitutional court after rejecting the election result.
- May 26 - Members of Prabowo Subianto's campaign team Mustofa Nahra was arrested for spreading false information on the 22 May riots.
- May 29 - Prominent member of Aceh Party Muzakir "Mualem" Manaf urged the Indonesian government to allow Acehnese government to conduct an independence referendum after KPU announced that Prabowo Subianto had lost the 2019 election. His statement caused public outcry among Indonesians.

=== June ===
- June 1 - MV Lintas Timur, a cargo vessel carrying 3,000 ton of cement and 18 crew members, sank off the coast of Sulawesi. SAR personnel managed to rescue one crew member and recovered one body. Sixteen other crew members were listed as missing.
- June 3 - A suicide bomber detonated his bomb at a police kiosk in Sukoharjo, Central Java. No one was killed in the attack.
- June 6 - One person was killed, two wounded and nearly 90 houses were burned after a riot occurred in Buton, Southeast Sulawesi.
- June 14 - The first trial for the disputes of the 2019 Indonesian presidential election has commenced in Jakarta.
- June 16 - More than 8,000 people evacuated following a massive flood in South Sulawesi.
- June 17 - MV Arim Jaya, a ship carrying 60 people, sank off the coast of Sumenep, killing at least 19.
- June 20 - Indonesian National Armed Forces will send 14,000 personnel during the ruling of the 2019 election disputes.
- June 21
  - Ulama association in Aceh declared PlayerUnknown's Battlegrounds (PUBG) as haram. The Acehnese regional people's representatives later asked the government to block PUBG in Aceh.
  - At least 30 people were killed after a fire at a match factory in Langkat, North Sumatra.
- June 22 - President Joko Widodo asked the Ministry of Education and Culture to revise the policy on the student enrollment program (PPDB).
- June 27 - The Indonesian Constitutional Court rejected Prabowo's plea to overturn the result of the 2019 Indonesian general election.
- June 28 - An Indonesian Air Force military helicopter carrying 12 passengers and crews vanished above the Papuan jungle, prompting search and rescue operation in the area
- June 29
  - A pickup truck carrying dozens of passengers flipped over in Trenggalek, Central Java. At least 19 people were injured in the accident.
  - At least 7 people were killed after a car was struck by a passenger train in Indramayu, West Java.
- June 30 - The Indonesian General Elections Commission formally declared Joko Widodo and Ma'ruf Amin as the winner of the 2019 Indonesian general election.

=== July ===
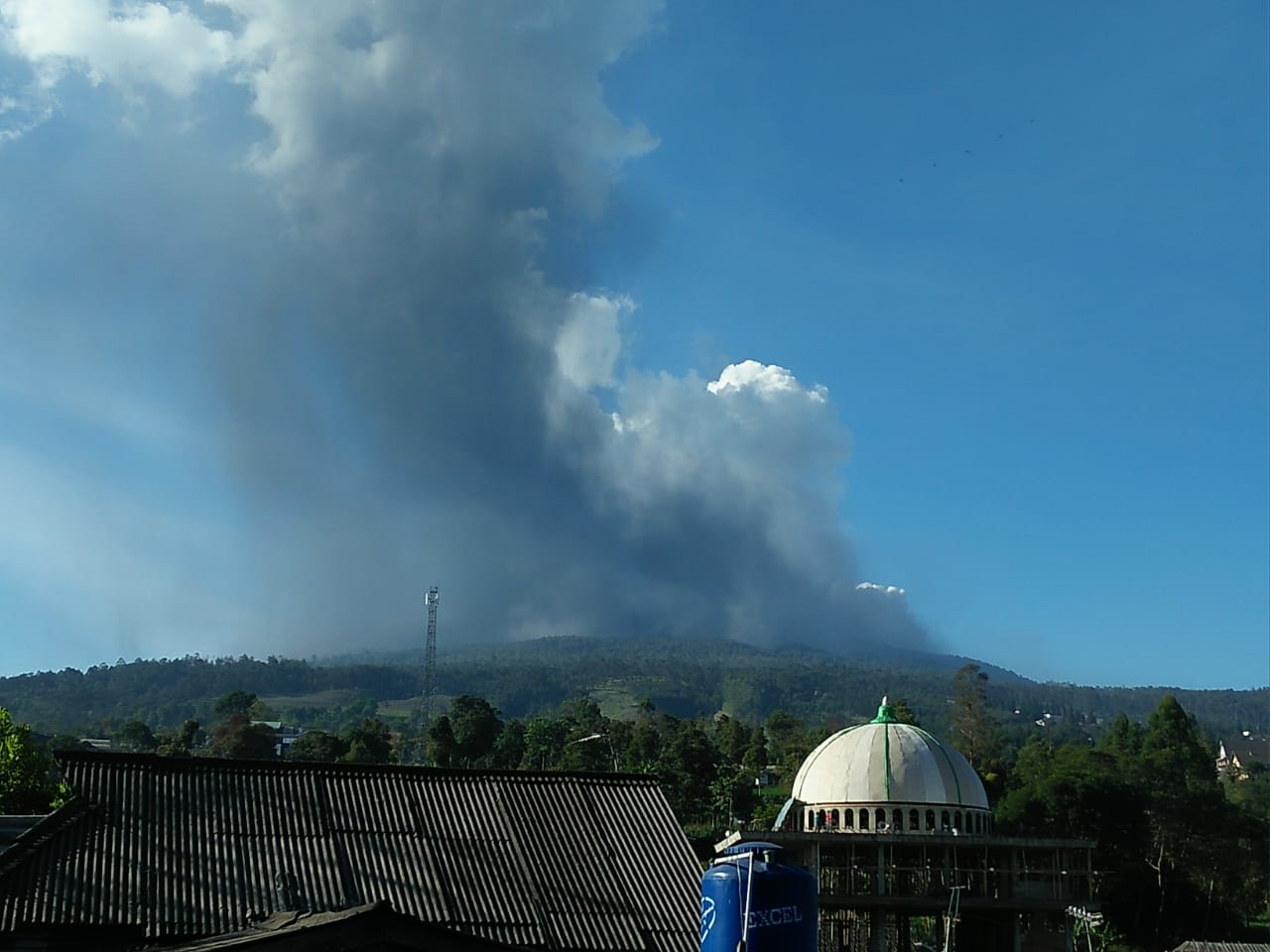
A phreatic eruption occurred at Mount Tangkuban Perahu, the first since 2013

- July 6 - More than 100 people were treated for minor injuries after a group of jellyfishes swarmed through multiple beaches in Gunungkidul, Yogyakarta.
- July 8 - In the 2019 UNESCO meeting, Ombilin Coal Mine of Sawahlunto was declared as a UNESCO World Heritage site.
- July 10 - Governor of Riau Islands, Nurdin Basirun, was arrested for a corruption case regarding a reclamation project in the province.
- July 12 - Prabowo supporters urged Prabowo Subianto not to reconcile with his presidential rival Joko Widodo.
- July 13 - Prabowo Subianto and Joko Widodo agreed to reconcile on the contested 2019 Indonesian presidential election. Both of whom later asked Indonesians to unite.
- July 14 - A 7.2 magnitude earthquake rocked North Maluku, causing damages to thousands of structures across the province. At least 14 people were killed in the quake.
- July 17
  - A total of 40 elementary school students at a local school in South Jakarta were treated after a mass food poisoning.
  - At least 4 people were killed and 7 others were injured after a riot broke out in Mesuji, Lampung.
- July 18 - Indonesian Minister of Foreign Affairs Retno Marsudi summoned the Deputy Ambassador of U.K to Indonesia Rob Fenn in response to Oxford University's decision to award Papuan separatist leader Benny Wenda with the Freedom of the City award.
- July 21 - Jambi Regional Police arrested 59 people suspected of assaulting multiple Indonesian soldiers and police on 13 February in Jambi.
- July 22 - Search and rescue team were deployed after a Cessna 172 carrying two people crashed into a river in Indramayu.
- July 25 - Indonesian president Joko Widodo and the Indonesian House of Representatives granted amnesty for Baiq Nuril, a former teacher who was arrested for reporting a sexual assault in Mataram.
- July 26 - A phreatic eruption occurred in Mount Tangkuban Perahu in Bandung, the first since 2013. No one was killed in the incident however several people reported breathing difficulties.
- July 31 - Controversy after the Indonesian government's consideration to recruit foreign rectors for multiple universities in Indonesia.

=== August ===
- August 1 - The Indonesian National Armed Forces decided to deploy a surveillance aircraft after a military helicopter carrying 12 people went missing above Papua for over a month.
- August 2 - A strong 6.9 magnitude earthquake struck Sunda Strait, killing 8 people.
- August 8 - MP I Nyoman Dhamantara, a member of the House of Representatives from the Indonesian Democratic Party of Struggle (PDIP), was arrested for allegedly accepting a total of Rp3.6 billion rupiah from a bribery case of garlic import.
- August 14 - A humanitarian group in Nduga Regency reported that a total of 182 local residents had died in a conflict between insurgents and the Indonesian soldiers from December to July. The Indonesian National Armed Forces refuted the claim, stating that it was 'propaganda'.
- August 16 - Forty-three Papuan students were arrested in Surabaya after a reported "disrespectful acts" towards the Indonesian flag. This, however, was disputed. The students were also attacked, verbally and physically, by local militias. The incident would lead to a series of protests across Papua.
- August 17 - A knife-carrying terrorist attacked a police station in Wonokromo, injuring a police officer. The attacker was deemed as "self radicalized terrorist" with a suspected connection with the 2018 Surabaya bombings.
- August 19 - September 23 - Riots occurred in Jayapura and other Papuan cities in response to the August 16 incident, with roads blocked and buildings torched down. Killings of non-Papuans were widely reported, prompting mass evacuations throughout the province.
- August 20 - MV Nur Aliya, a cargo vessel carrying nickel ores, went missing near Buru Island of the Moluccas with 27 crews on board.
- August 22 - MV Santika Nusantara, a passenger vessel carrying over 100 passengers and crew members, caught fire in Masalembu, Madura. At least 4 people were killed and more than a dozen people were missing after the incident.
- August 24 - At least 13 fishers were rescued after a massive pier collapsed in Tegalbeud, Sukabumi Regency.
- August 27 - Papuan students from the Surabaya dormitory, who were accused of "disrespecting the symbol of the nation" and racist attack by local militias, rejected the Governor of Papua Lukas Enembe's visit to the dormitory.
- August 29 - In response to the increasing violence and rioting in Papua, Joko Widodo announced that he would hold talks with several Papuan figures to discuss the possible solution.
- August 30 - President Joko Widodo ordered authorities to arrest the perpetrators of the racist attack on Papuan students in a Surabaya dormitory on 16 August. He also ordered authorities to arrest rioters and looters during the 2019 Papuan protests.

=== September ===
- September 1 - A horror story of a group of students who were attacked by supernatural beings during a student study service in the 2000s in East Java becomes one of the hottest topic of 2019 in Indonesia.
- September 2 - At least 8 people were killed and more than a dozen people were injured after a pile-up in Cipularang.
- September 3
  - Indonesian Ministry of Communication and Information claimed that several hoaxes on the conflict in Papua have extensively spread in 20 foreign countries.
  - Coordinating Minister of Political, Legal, and Security Affairs Wiranto reiterated that the government will never allow an independence referendum to take place in Papua.
- September 4
  - Ministry of Communication and Information restored internet access across Papua.
  - Indonesian National Police stated that they would work together with Interpol to find and arrest Veronica Koman, an Indonesian who reportedly provoked people by posting "unverified claims" and promoting independence in Papua.
- September 5 - United Nations Human Rights Council urged the Indonesian government to hold talks with Papuan residents to de-escalate tensions in the region.
- September 6 - Indonesian National Police claimed that ISIS was behind the riots in Papua.
- September 8
  - President Joko Widodo was criticized for his ambiguous stance on parliament's decision to discuss on whether to revise the KPK law, a decision which was seen as an attempt to weaken the power of the anti-corruption commission.
  - Indonesian Child Protection Commission (KPAI) was criticized due to the termination of the infamous PB Djarum badminton scholarship.
- September 9 - Condemnations after a group of unidentified people threw a bag of snakes onto a Papuan students dormitory in Surabaya.
- September 12 - At least two people died and more than a hundred were hospitalized after a mass food poisoning in Sukabumi.
- September 13 - Widespread disappointment and criticism after President Joko Widodo announced his support for the revision on the KPK Law. Political experts criticized Joko Widodo for being weak in front of pleas from multiple political parties in his coalition.
- September 14
  - At least 44 houses were damaged after a massive ammunition storage explosion in Semarang.
  - Dozens of santri were hospitalized for mass food poisoning in Blitar.
- September 16 - At least 8 people were killed and 24 people were wounded after a bus crashed onto a tanker truck in Lampung.
- September 17
  - Demonstration in front of the parliament after the House of Representatives passed the revised KPK law.
  - At least 49 schoolgirls from a local dormitory in Simalungun were treated for food poisoning after consuming contaminated mackerel tuna.
- September 18 - KPK names Indonesian Youth and Sports minister Imam Nahrawi as suspect in KONI bribery case.
- September 19 - Youth and Sports Minister Imam Nahrawi to step down from his position after KPK named him as a suspect in KONI bribery.
- September 22 - Search and rescue team found the wreckage of a missing Twin Otter in a Papuan jungle.
- September 23 - Reports of sporadic killings of non-Papuan residents in Papua after a massive riot broke out in Wamena.

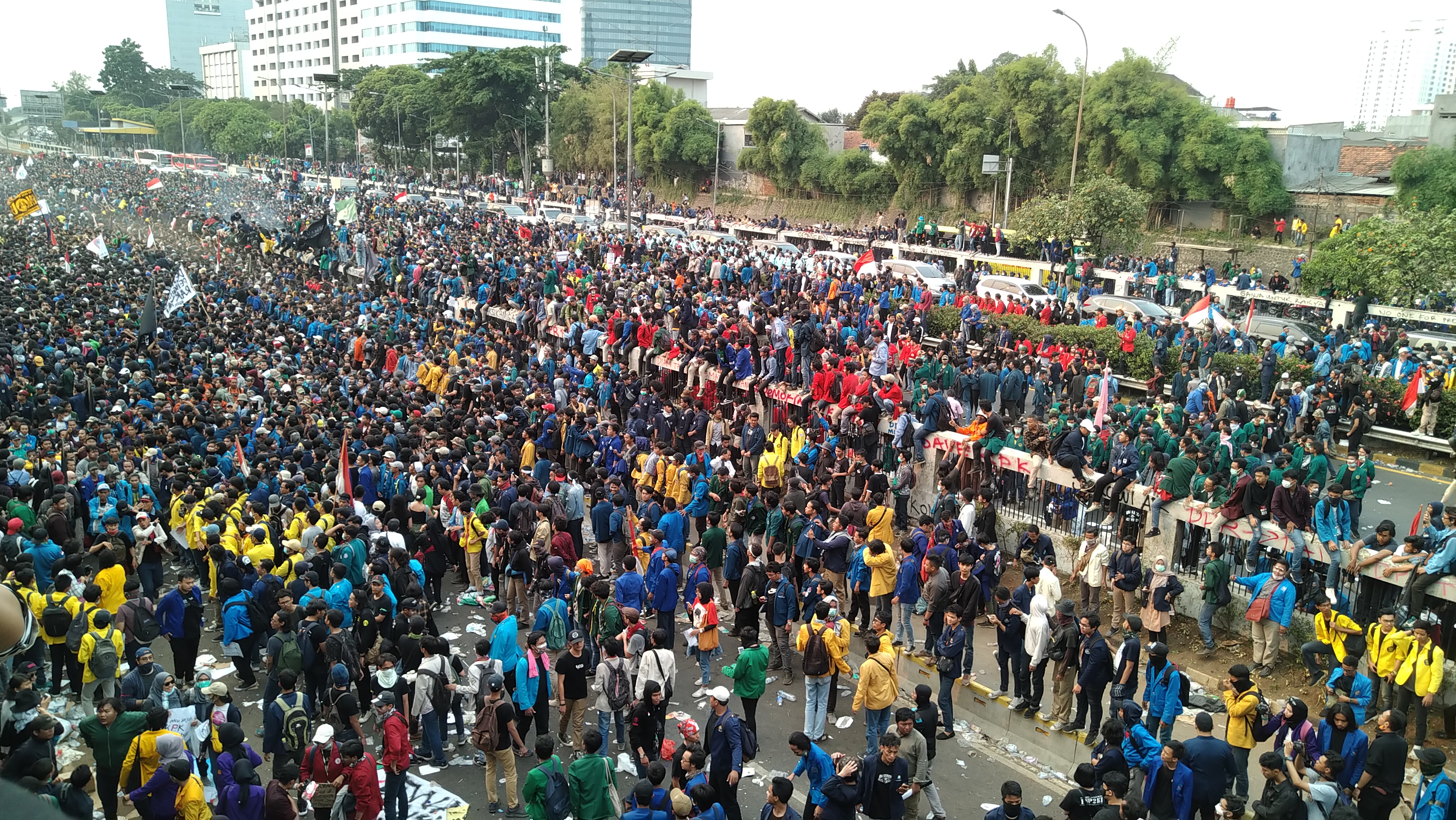
Hundreds of thousands of students poured onto the street in response to the passing of the controversial penal code

- September 23 - October 28 - Strings of protests, mainly held by university students, erupted across Indonesia as the House of Representatives announced a controversial penal code that allegedly would "restrict freedom and human rights"
- September 25 - Military personnel were deployed after protests against the new controversial penal code turned violent in Jakarta.
- September 26 - A 6.5 magnitude earthquake struck the island of Ambon, killing 41 and injuring thousands

=== October ===
- October 1 - Newly elected members of the Indonesian People's Representatives Council for the 2019 - 2024 period were inaugurated in Jakarta.
- October 3 - Former Speaker of the Indonesian People's Representative Council Bambang Soesatyo was inaugurated as the Speaker of the Indonesian People's Consultative Assembly.
- October 4 - At least 13 people, including several Singaporeans, were trapped after a massive fire engulfed Mount Raung.
- October 6 - KPK arrested the Regent of North Lampung Regency Agung Ilmu Mangkunegara for alleged bribery of a project in Public Works division.
- October 8 - Large boulders rained upon a village in Purwakarta after a strong blasting at a local mine. At least one school and seven houses were destroyed due to the incident.
- October 9 - Indonesian National Human Rights Commission announced that there were indications of severe human rights violations on the death of two university students during a mass demonstration in Kendari.
- October 10 - Coordinating Minister for Political, Legal and Security Affairs Wiranto was attacked during his visit in Pandeglang, West Java. Wiranto survived the assassination attempt.
- October 15 - KPK arrested Regent of Indramayu Supendi for an alleged bribery case of a project fee in the Public Works division.
- October 16 - Dozens of people evacuated after riots broke out in Penajam North Paser Regency.

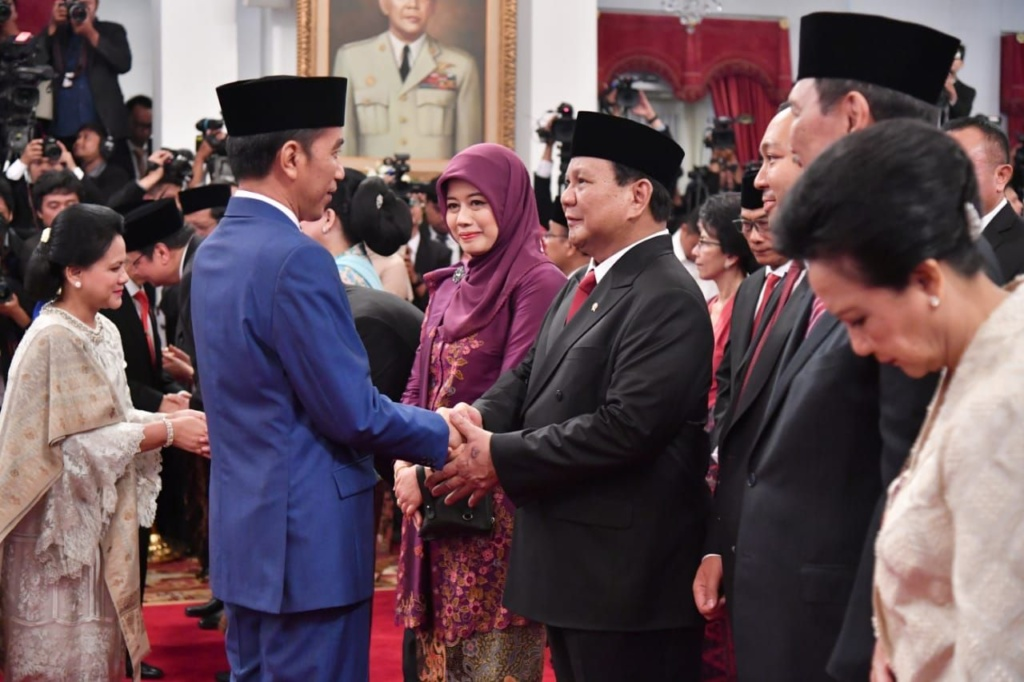
Rival presidential candidate Prabowo Subianto was eventually chosen as the new Indonesian Defense Minister

- October 20 - Joko Widodo and Ma'ruf Amin were inaugurated as the President and Vice President of Indonesia for 2019 - 2024 period.
- October 23 - President Joko Widodo and Vice President Ma'ruf Amin announced and inaugurated members of the new Indonesian cabinet.
- October 30 - Calls for probe after a member of Indonesian Solidarity Party questioned unreasonable budgeting on the 2020 Jakarta draft budget.

=== November ===
- November 1 - Widespread criticism after newly appointed Minister of Religious Affairs Fachrul Razi made a controversial comment on niqabis and "cingkrang" trousers wearers.
- November 2 - One person went missing after an Indonesian research vessel collided with a fishing boat in Banten.
- November 6 - Anger and criticisms after Chief of Presidential Staff Moeldoko leaked President Joko Widodo's plan to add 6 deputy ministers in the new Indonesian cabinet.
- November 10
  - Eldest son of President Joko Widodo, Gibran Rakabuming, came under fire after he announced his candidacy bid on Surakarta's mayoral election.
  - Nearly 500 houses were damaged or destroyed after strong winds swept Bojonegoro.
- November 11 - Indonesian Food and Drug Authority suggested the government to ban vape and cigarettes, prompting controversy.
- November 13 - A suicide bomber attacked a police headquarter in Medan, injuring 6 people.
- November 14 - Regional Disaster Mitigation Agency of East Java reported that thousands of homes had been damaged or destroyed across East Java after strong winds and severe weather condition struck 12 regencies.
- November 15 - Former Minister of Religious Affairs Lukman Hakim Saifuddin was summoned by KPK for his alleged involvement on a gratification case and hajj mismanagement case.
- November 16 - Public outcry after the Indonesian Supreme Court decided that the assets of First Travel, a hajj and umroh travel company which was accused for frauds, would be seized by the Indonesian Government.
- November 17 - MP Dewi Tanjung was reported to the Indonesian Police after she reported Novel Baswedan, a KPK investigator who was a victim of an acid attack in 2017, for "faking an acid attack".
- November 18 - Institute for Development of Acehnese Society (IDeAS) questioned the Acehnese Government for a possible mark up of several budgets in 2019 Acehnese budget.
- November 24 - Widespread criticisms after a member of the Indonesian House of Representatives announced a possible discussion to extend the presidential terms.
- November 26 - Indonesian artist Agnez Monica was under fire after her "I'm not an Indonesian" comment.
- November 27
  - Attorney General of Indonesia banned members of the LGBTQ+ community to register on the 2019 civil servant enrollment test.
  - Government announced that medical team and psychologists would be provided to detect people with queerness or homosexuality.
- November 30
  - At least 71 homes were damaged due to strong winds in Magelang, Central Java.
  - At least 3 people were injured and dozens of homes were damaged after a twister struck a village in Jombang, East Java.
- November 30 – 11 December - With 72 golds, 84 silvers and 111 bronzes, Indonesia was ranked 5th at the 2019 Southeast Asian Games

=== December ===
- December 3
  - At least 73 houses were damaged after strong winds swept 4 villages in Temanggung .
  - KPK members expressed their disappointment after the Indonesian Supreme Court decided to reduce the prison sentence of Idrus Marham, a former Minister of Social Affairs who was convicted for a corruption case of a power plant project in Riau, to 2 years in prison.
- December 4 - At least 77 houses were damaged or destroyed after strong winds and hailstorm swept several villages in Situbondo. Reports of strong winds also came from Grobogan, where one person was injured and dozens of homes were reportedly damaged.
- December 5 - One person was killed and hundreds of structures, including a section of Jember Airport, were damaged or destroyed after strong winds swept through 5 districts in Jember, East Java.
- December 8 - Reports of damage from 28 locations throughout Yogyakarta after strong winds swept the province.
- December 11 - A bus carrying dozens of students crashed onto a cliff in Padang. At least 12 people were injured.
- December 13 - More than 450 people were evacuated after a massive flood swept through South Solok Regency, West Sumatra.
- December 19
  - Dozens of homes were damaged and one person was injured after strong winds struck 6 districts in Jombang, East Java.
  - At least 21 houses were damaged after a violent hailstorm struck Blitar, East Java.
  - A total of 18 elementary students were wounded after a car carrying delegations of a national sport olympiad flipped over in Bandung, West Java.
- December 22 - A truck carrying an excavator was involved in a pile-up accident in Purwodadi, East Java, killing at least 7 people.
- December 23 - A bus crash in Pagar Alam, South Sumatra kills 35 people.
- December 26 - The annular solar eclipse of December 26, 2019 was observed in various cities across Indonesia

== Deaths ==
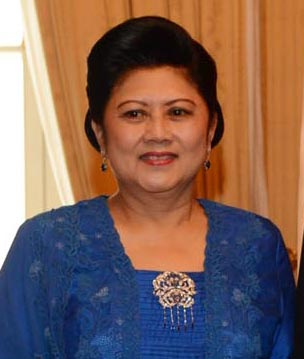
Ani Yudhoyono

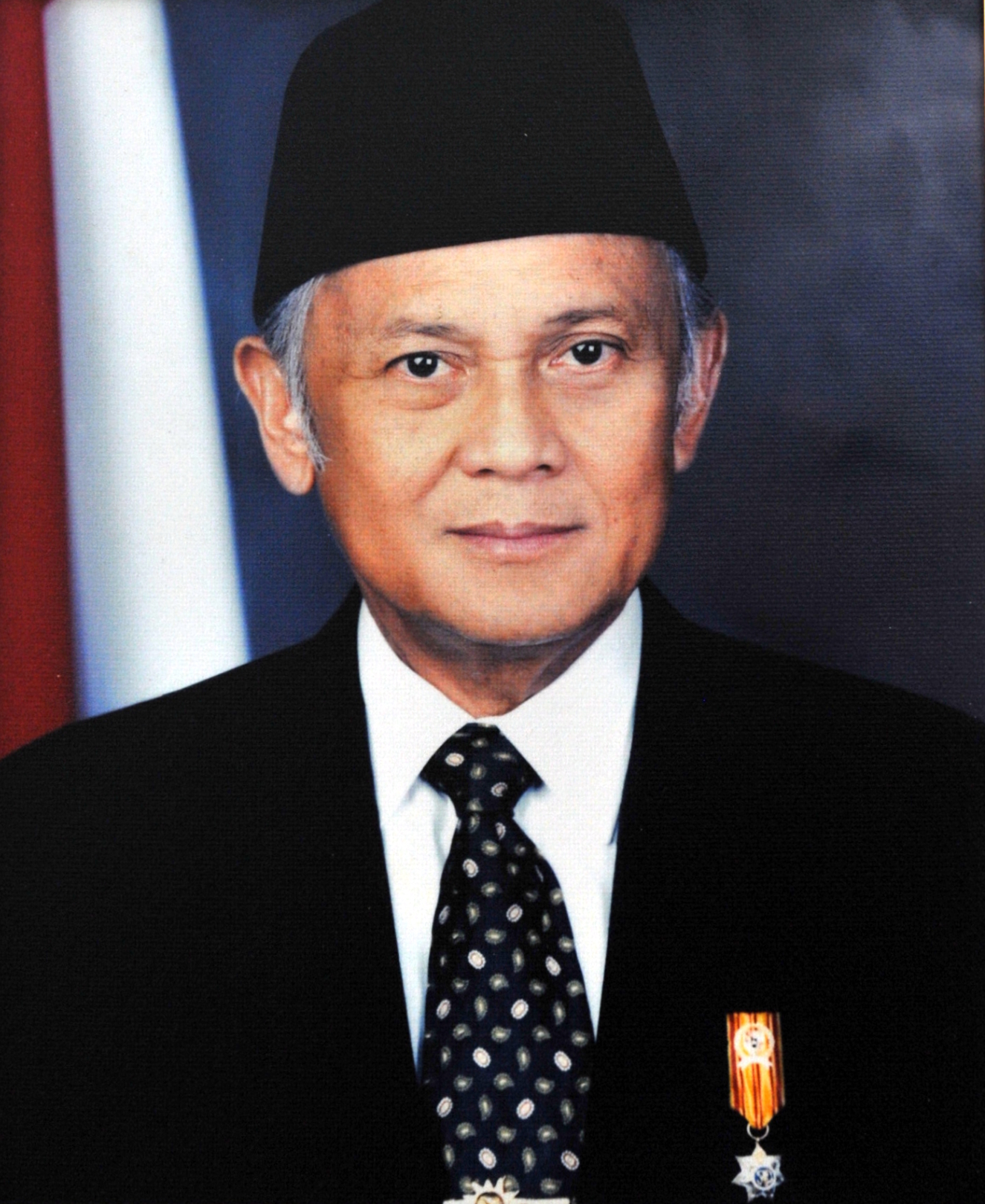
B. J. Habibie

=== January ===
- January 4 - Torro Margens, actor and director (b. 1950).
- January 12 - Nukman Luthfie, businessman (b. 1964).
- January 14 - Robby Tumewu, actor and designer (b. 1953).
- January 15 - Gebi Ramadhan, comedian (b. 1994).
- January 25 - Erik Dwi Ermawansyah, footballer (b. 1996).
- January 26 - Eka Tjipta Widjaja, founder of the Sinar Mas Group (b. 1921).
- January 29 - Rahman Tolleng, activist and politician (b. 1937).
- January 30 - Saphira Indah, actress (b. 1986).
- January 31 - Awaluddin Djamin, Chief of Police (1978–1982) (b. 1927).

=== February ===
- February 1 - Parhan Ali, politician, Regent of West Bangka, Bangka Belitung (b. 1947).
- February 15 - Mohamed Purnomo, Olympic sprinter (1984) (b. 1962).
- February 20 - Nana Krip, comedian (b. 1946).
- February 28 - Didik Mangkuprojo, comedian (b.1938).

=== March ===
- March 2 - Nur Tompel, comedian (b. 1954).

=== April ===
- April 11 - Mus Mulyadi, singer (b. 1945).
- April 17 - Dynand Fariz, fashion designer, founder of Jember Fashion Carnaval (b.1963)

=== May ===
- May 31 – Hari Sabarno, Indonesian military officer and politician (b. 1944)

=== June ===
- June 1 - Ani Yudhoyono, First Lady of Indonesia (2004–2014) (b. 1952).
- June 12 - George Toisutta, former Indonesian Chief of Staff of the Indonesian Army (b.1953).
- June 13 - Robby Sugara, actor (b. 1950).

=== July ===
- July 2 - Jacky Zimah, singer (b. 1955).
- July 7 – Sutopo Purwo Nugroho, civil servant and academic (b. 1969)
- July 13 – Abu Bakar, Indonesian politician (b. 1952)
- July 19 – Arswendo Atmowiloto, Indonesian journalist and writer (b. 1948)

=== August ===
- August 1 - Agung Hercules, actor, comedian and singer (b. 1968).
- August 11 - Pollycarpus Swantoro, historian (b. 1932).

=== September ===
- September 11 – B. J. Habibie, 3rd President of Indonesia (b. 1936)
- September 12 - Ida Laila, singer (b. 1943).

=== November ===
- November 2 - Afridza Syach Munandar, racer (b. 1999).
- November 13 - Djaduk Ferianto, actor (b. 1964).
- November 19 - Cecep Reza, actor (b. 1987).
