= 1986 in film =

The following is an overview of events in 1986 in film, including the highest-grossing films, award ceremonies and festivals, a list of films released and notable births and deaths.

== Highest-grossing films (U.S.) ==
The top ten 1986 released films by box office gross in North America are as follows:

Highest-grossing films of 1986
Rank	Title	Distributor	Box-office gross
1	Top Gun	Paramount	$180,470,489
2	Crocodile Dundee	Paramount	$174,803,506
3	Platoon	Orion	$137,900,000
4	The Karate Kid Part II	Columbia	$115,103,979
5	Star Trek IV: The Voyage Home	Paramount	$109,713,132
6	Back to School	Orion	$91,258,000
7	Aliens	20th Century Fox	$86,160,248
8	The Golden Child	Paramount	$79,817,937
9	Ruthless People	Buena Vista	$71,624,879
10	Ferris Bueller's Day Off	Paramount	$70,136,169

== Events ==
- January 7 - Lawrence Gordon resigns as president and chief operating officer of the Fox Entertainment Group, citing poor health
- February 3 - Pixar Animation Studios is founded by Edwin Catmull and Alvy Ray Smith.
- April - Guy McElwaine resigns as head of Columbia Pictures.
- April 26 - Actor Arnold Schwarzenegger marries television journalist Maria Shriver.
- June - First Midnight Sun Film Festival in Sodankylä, Finnish Lapland.
- July 2 - The Great Mouse Detective is released to theaters to positive reviews and is a critical and financial success, just behind An American Tail, saving the Disney Studio from bankruptcy after the failure of The Black Cauldron.
- August 6 - Timothy Dalton is officially announced as the fourth actor to portray James Bond.
- September - David Puttnam becomes head of Columbia Pictures.
- September 20 - Film review television program Siskel & Ebert premieres in syndication. Although the two critics have been working as a pair since 1975, this will be their longest running program and will run in various incarnations until 2010.
- November 21 - The first animated film produced by Steven Spielberg, An American Tail, is released, and breaks the record once held by Disney's The Rescuers for the largest financial amount made for an animated film on opening weekend.
- November 29
  - Actor Cary Grant dies of a cerebral hemorrhage in Davenport, Iowa.
  - Stuntman Dar Robinson is killed on the set of the film Million Dollar Mystery.

== Awards ==
Category/Organization	44th Golden Globe Awards January 31, 1987		40th BAFTA Awards February 22, 1987	59th Academy Awards March 30, 1987
Category/Organization	Drama	Comedy or Musical	40th BAFTA Awards February 22, 1987	59th Academy Awards March 30, 1987
Best Film	Platoon	Hannah and Her Sisters	A Room with a View	Platoon
Best Director	Oliver Stone; Platoon		Woody Allen; Hannah and Her Sisters	Oliver Stone; Platoon
Best Actor	Bob Hoskins; Mona Lisa	Paul Hogan; Crocodile Dundee	Bob Hoskins; Mona Lisa	Paul Newman; The Color of Money
Best Actress	Marlee Matlin; Children of a Lesser God	Sissy Spacek; Crimes of the Heart	Maggie Smith; A Room with a View	Marlee Matlin; Children of a Lesser God
Best Supporting Actor	Tom Berenger; Platoon		Ray McAnally; The Mission	Michael Caine; Hannah and Her Sisters
Best Supporting Actress	Maggie Smith; A Room with a View		Judi Dench; A Room with a View	Dianne Wiest; Hannah and Her Sisters
Best Screenplay, Adapted	The Mission; Robert Bolt		Out of Africa; Kurt Luedtke	A Room with a View; Ruth Prawer Jhabvala
Best Screenplay, Original	The Mission; Robert Bolt		Hannah and Her Sisters; Woody Allen	Hannah and Her Sisters; Woody Allen
Best Original Score	Ennio Morricone; The Mission			Herbie Hancock; Round Midnight
Best Original Song	"Take My Breath Away"; Top Gun		N/A	"Take My Breath Away"; Top Gun
Best Foreign Language Film	The Assault (De Aanslag)		Ran (Ran)	The Assault (De Aanslag)

Palme d'Or (Cannes Film Festival):

The Mission, directed by Roland Joffé, United Kingdom

Golden Lion (Venice Film Festival):

The Green Ray (Le Rayon vert), directed by Éric Rohmer, France

Golden Bear (Berlin Film Festival):

Stammheim, directed by Reinhard Hauff, West Germany

People's Choice Award (Toronto International Film Festival):

The Decline of the American Empire (Le déclin de l'empire américain), directed by Denys Arcand, Canada

== 1986 films ==
=== By country/region ===
- List of American films of 1986
- List of Argentine films of 1986
- List of Australian films of 1986
- List of Bangladeshi films of 1986
- List of British films of 1986
- List of Canadian films of 1986
- List of French films of 1986
- List of Hong Kong films of 1986
- List of Indian films of 1986
  - List of Hindi films of 1986
  - List of Kannada films of 1986
  - List of Malayalam films of 1986
  - List of Marathi films of 1986
  - List of Tamil films of 1986
  - List of Telugu films of 1986
- List of Japanese films of 1986
- List of Mexican films of 1986
- List of Pakistani films of 1986
- List of South Korean films of 1986
- List of Soviet films of 1986
- List of Spanish films of 1986

=== By genre/medium ===
- List of action films of 1986
- List of animated feature films of 1986
- List of avant-garde films of 1986
- List of comedy films of 1986
- List of drama films of 1986
- List of horror films of 1986
- List of science fiction films of 1986
- List of thriller films of 1986
- List of western films of 1986

== Births ==
- January 1
  - Joseph Balderrama, Mexican actor
  - Jessica Gunning, English actress
  - Colin Morgan, Northern Irish actor
- January 4 - Charlyne Yi, American actor, comedian, musician and writer
- January 5 - Deepika Padukone, Indian actress
- January 8 - Yash, Indian actor
- January 12 - Chris Evangelou, British actor
- January 13 - Anna Sergejeva, Ukrainian-Estonian actress
- January 15 - Jessy Schram, American actress
- January 16 - Mason Gamble, American former actor
- January 17 - Max Adler, American actor
- January 21
  - Sushant Singh Rajput, Indian actor (d. 2020)
  - Ken Yamamura, Japanese actor
- January 24
  - Mischa Barton, English-American actress
  - Raviv Ullman, Israeli actor
- January 29 - Ashley Lilley, Scottish actress and singer
- January 30 - Ashley Buccille, American actress
- February 1 - Lauren Conrad, American TV personality and author
- February 2 - Gemma Arterton, English actress
- February 4
  - Danielle Vega, American actress
  - Mari Yamamoto, Japanese actress and journalist
- February 6 - Dane DeHaan, American actor
- February 9 - Jade Xu, actress
- February 10 - Christopher Abbott, American actor
- February 12 - Valorie Curry, American actress
- February 14 - Tiffany Thornton, American actress, comedian, and singer-songwriter
- February 18
  - Sakura Ando, Japanese actress
  - Alessandra Mastronardi, Italian actress
  - Dumbfoundead, American rapper and actor
- February 19
  - Björn Gustafsson, Swedish comedian and actor
  - Ophelia Lovibond, English actress
  - Maria Mena, Norwegian singer
- February 22
  - Josh Helman, Australian actor
  - Miko Hughes, American actor
- February 24
  - Bryce Papenbrook, American voice actor
  - Benny Safdie, American director, screenwriter, actor and editor
- February 25
  - Jameela Jamil, English actress
  - James and Oliver Phelps, English twin actors
- February 26 - Teresa Palmer. Australian actress, writer, model and film producer
- March 1 - Alec Utgoff, Soviet-born English actor
- March 2 - Ethan Peck, American actor
- March 4 - Margo Harshman, American actress
- March 5 - Jason Fuchs, American actor and screenwriter
- March 9 - Brittany Snow, American actress
- March 14 - Jamie Bell, English actor and dancer.
- March 15 - Jai Courtney, Australian actor
- March 16 - Alexandra Daddario, American actress
- March 17 - Olesya Rulin, Russian-American actress
- March 20 - Ruby Rose, Australian actress
- March 21 - Scott Eastwood, American actor and model
- March 22 - Matt Bush, American actor
- March 23 - Steven Strait, American actor and singer
- March 24 - Jason Wong, British actor
- March 28 - Lady Gaga, American singer and actress
- March 29 - Lucas Elliot Eberl, American actor and director
- March 30 - Simon Baker, Aboriginal-Canadian actor
- March 31 - Craig McGinlay, Scottish actor
- April 1 - Jenn Murray, Northern Irish actress
- April 3 - Amanda Bynes, American actress and variety show host
- April 4 - Gavin Stenhouse, English actor
- April 7 - Jason Ralph, American actor
- April 9 - Leighton Meester, American actress and singer
- April 12 - Titanilla Bogdányi, Hungarian voice actress
- April 15 - Ester Dean, American singer-songwriter and actress
- April 17 - Zheng Kai, Chinese actor and television personality
- April 19 - Henrik Kalmet, Estonian actor
- April 22 - Amber Heard, American actress
- April 23 - Alisha Morrison, Canadian actress
- April 24 - Tahyna MacManus, Australian actress, director, writer and producer
- April 25
  - John DeLuca, American actor and singer
  - Daniel Sharman, English actor
- April 27 - Jenna Coleman, English actress
- April 30
  - Dianna Agron, American actress, singer and director
  - Beau Wirick, American actor
- May 3
  - Poppy Delevingne, English actress
  - Pom Klementieff, French actress and model
- May 6 - Sasheer Zamata, American actress and comedienne
- May 7 - Robbie Jarvis, British actor
- May 11 - Tia Ballard, American voice actress
- May 12
  - Eileen Pedde, American actress
  - Emily VanCamp, Canadian actress
  - Leonard Wu, American actor
- May 13
  - Lena Dunham, American writer, director, actress, and producer
  - Robert Pattinson, English actor
- May 16 - Megan Fox, American actress and model
- May 17
  - T.J. Lowther, American actor
  - Tahj Mowry, American actor
- May 19 - Eric Lloyd, American actor, comedian, musician and producer
- May 20 - Robert Emms, British actor
- May 21
  - David Ajala, British actor
  - Da'Vine Joy Randolph, American actress and singer
- May 23 - Ryan Coogler, American filmmaker
- May 26
  - Àstrid Bergès-Frisbey, Spanish-French actress
  - Ed Skudder, American animator, storyboard artist, filmmaker, musician and voice actor
- May 28 - Joseph Cross, American actor and producer
- May 30 - Will Peltz, American actor
- June 1 - Alessio Puccio, Italian voice actor
- June 3
  - Brenden Jefferson, American child actor and songwriter
  - Josh Segarra, American actor
- June 4
  - Oona Chaplin, Spanish-British actress
  - Yahav Winner, Israeli filmmaker (d. 2023)
- June 5 - Amanda Crew, Canadian actress
- June 6 - Cameron Britton, American actor
- June 10 - Francisco Ortiz, Spanish actor
- June 11 - Shia LaBeouf, American actor, performance artist, and filmmaker
- June 12
  - Jessica Keenan Wynn, American actress, singer and voice-over artist
  - Luke Youngblood, English actor
- June 13
  - Kat Dennings, American actress
  - Mary-Kate and Ashley Olsen, American twin actresses and entrepreneurs
- June 14 - Haley Hudson, American actress
- June 17 - Marie Avgeropoulos, Canadian actress and model
- June 18
  - Richard Madden, Scottish actor
  - Matt Walsh, American political pundit and documentary filmmaker
- June 19
  - Nazareno Casero, Argentinian actor
  - Erin Mackey, American actress and singer
- June 20 - Dreama Walker, American retired actress
- June 26 - Brittney Karbowski, American voice actress
- June 27
  - Drake Bell, American actor, comedian, musician, singer-songwriter and record producer
  - Sam Claflin, British actor
- July 1 - Sonoya Mizuno, British actress
- July 2 - Lindsay Lohan, American actress, singer, songwriter, producer, and entrepreneur
- July 8 - Jake McDorman, American actor
- July 9 - Jeff Rowe, American writer and director
- July 10 - Wyatt Russell, American actor
- July 15 - Yahya Abdul-Mateen II, American actor
- July 16 - Laura Carmichael, English actress
- July 17 - Brando Eaton, American actor
- July 21
  - Betty Gilpin, American actress
  - Diane Guerrero, American actress
- July 23 - Reece Ritchie, English actor
- July 24
  - Alexander England, Australian actor
  - Remy Hii, Australian actor
  - Megan Park, Canadian actress and director
- July 26 - Saphira Indah, Indonesian actress (d. 2019)
- July 27 - Felecia Angelle, American voice actress
- July 31 - Wunmi Mosaku, Nigerian-born British actress
- August 1 - Elijah Kelley, American actor and singer
- August 2
  - Yann Gael, French-Cameroonian actor
  - Lily Gladstone, American actress
- August 6 - Nanna Blondell, Swedish actress
- August 13 - Ashley Spillers, American actress
- August 14 - Casey LaBow, American actress and producer
- August 16 - Shawn Pyfrom, American actor and singer
- August 17 - Katia Elizarova, Russian model and actress
- August 22 - Keiko Kitagawa, Japanese actress
- August 27 - Jack Kesy, American actor
- August 28 - Armie Hammer, American actor
- August 29
  - Nicole Byer, African-American comedian, television host and actress
  - Lea Michele, American actress and singer
- August 31
  - Ryan Kelley, American actor
  - Johnny Wactor, American actor (d. 2024)
- September 6 - Kalani Queypo, American actor
- September 10 - Sarah Levy, Canadian actress
- September 12
  - Alfie Allen, English actor
  - Emmy Rossum, American actress and singer
- September 14 - A. J. Trauth, American actor and musician
- September 16
  - Ian Harding, American actor
  - Kyla Pratt, American actress
  - Michael James Shaw, American actor and writer
- September 17 - Yoshitsugu Matsuoka, Japanese voice actor
- September 18 - Keeley Hazell, English model and actress
- September 19
  - Carrie Finlay, Canadian actress
  - Peter Vack, American actor, writer, director and producer
- September 20 - Aldis Hodge, American actor
- September 23
  - Kaylee DeFer, American former actress
  - Jana Pérez, Spanish actress and model
- September 30 - Ki Hong Lee, Korean-American actor
- October 1
  - Sayaka Kanda, Japanese actress, voice actress and singer (d. 2021)
  - Jurnee Smollett, American actress
- October 2 - Camilla Belle, American actress, director, and producer
- October 3 - Joonas Suotamo, Finnish actor
- October 5 - Kevin Bigley, American actor
- October 6
  - Luisa D'Oliveira, Canadian actress
  - Olivia Thirlby, American actress
- October 7
- Holland Roden American actress
- Amber Stevens West American actress
- October 12 - Rafal Zawierucha, Polish actor
- October 13 - Tom Attenborough, English voice actor
- October 15
  - Ali Fazal, Indian actor
  - Paul Walter Hauser, American actor
- October 22 - Kyle Gallner, American actor
- October 23
  - Emilia Clarke, British actress
  - Jessica Stroup, American actress
- October 24
  - Drake, Canadian rapper, singer, and actor
  - Nobuhiko Okamoto, Japanese voice actor and singer
- October 28
  - May Calamawy, Egyptian-Palestinian actress
  - Aditi Rao Hydari, Indian actress
- November 1 - Penn Badgley, American actor
- November 4 - Alexz Johnson, Canadian singer-songwriter and actress
- November 10 - Josh Peck, American actor
- November 14
  - Cory Michael Smith, American actor
  - Sophie von Haselberg, American actress
- November 15
  - Winston Duke, Tobagonian actor
  - Jason Trost, American filmmaker and actor
- November 18
  - Georgia King, Scottish actress
  - Pablo Lyle, Mexican actor
  - Ragne Veensalu, Estonian actress
- November 20 - Kingsley Ben-Adir, British actor
- November 21 - Colleen Ballinger, American comedian, YouTuber, actress, singer and writer
- November 25 - Katie Cassidy, American actress and singer
- November 26 - Trevor Morgan, American actor
- November 28 - Johnny Simmons, American actor
- November 30 - Robert Boulter, English actor
- December 17 - Emma Bell, American actress
- December 19 - Annie Murphy, Canadian actress
- December 24 - Annika Noelle, American Soap Opera Actress
- December 26 - Kit Harington, English actor
- December 27 - Lali González, Paraguayan theatre actress
- December 29 - Ally Maki, American actress
- December 30 - Ellie Goulding, English singer and songwriter
- December 31 - Bronson Pelletier, Canadian actor
- Cathy Yan, Chinese-born American film director, screenwriter, and producer

== Deaths ==
Month	Date	Name	Age	Country	Profession	Notable films
January	1	Emmet Lavery	83	US	Screenwriter	The Court-Martial of Billy Mitchell; Army Surgeon
January	2	Una Merkel	82	US	Actress	The Parent Trap; 42nd Street
January	14	Donna Reed	64	US	Actress	It's a Wonderful Life; From Here To Eternity
January	24	Gordon MacRae	64	US	Actor, Singer	Oklahoma!; Carousel
January	27	Lilli Palmer	78	Germany	Actress	Body and Soul; The Boys from Brazil
January	29	Leif Erickson	74	US	Actor	Tea and Sympathy; Kiss Them for Me
February	2	Donald Eccles	77	UK	Actor	The Wicker Man; Young Sherlock Holmes
February	6	Ray Moyer	87	US	Set Decorator	Sunset Boulevard; Cleopatra
February	6	Dandy Nichols	78	UK	Actress	Help!; The Vikings
February	10	Brian Aherne	83	UK	Actor	Juarez; A Night to Remember
February	16	Howard Da Silva	82	US	Actor	1776; The Lost Weekend
February	17	Paul Stewart	77	US	Actor	Citizen Kane; In Cold Blood
February	19	Adolfo Celi	63	Italy	Actor	Thunderball; Danger: Diabolik
February	22	Bill Hickman	65	US	Stuntman, Actor	The French Connection; Bullitt
February	23	Nino Taranto	78	Italy	Actor	Husbands in the City; The Monk of Monza
February	25	Pasquale Festa Campanile	58	Italy	Director, Screenwriter	Petomaniac; The Leopard
February	27	Eugene Forde	87	US	Director	Charlie Chan in London; Dressed to Kill
March	3	Peter Capell	73	Germany	Actor	Willy Wonka & the Chocolate Factory; Paths of Glory
March	6	Adolph Caesar	52	US	Actor	A Soldier's Story; The Color Purple
March	10	Ray Milland	77	UK	Actor, Director	Dial M for Murder; The Lost Weekend
March	14	Edith Atwater	74	US	Actress	Sweet Smell of Success; Strait-Jacket
March	21	Derek Farr	74	UK	Actor	The Dam Busters; The Projected Man
March	22	Olive Deering	67	US	Actress	The Ten Commandments; Samson and Delilah
March	22	Charles Starrett	82	US	Actor	The Durango Kid; Gallant Defender
March	25	Gloria Blondell	75	US	Actress	Accidents Will Happen; Daredevil Drivers
March	28	Virginia Gilmore	66	US	Actress	Western Union; That Other Woman
March	29	Harry Ritz	86	US	Comedian, Actor	The Three Musketeers; Silent Movie
March	30	Herman A. Blumenthal	69	US	Art Director, Production Designer	Journey to the Center of the Earth; Hello, Dolly!
March	30	James Cagney	86	US	Actor	White Heat; Yankee Doodle Dandy
March	31	Jerry Paris	60	US	Actor, Director	Marty; The Caine Mutiny
April	3	Mary C. McCall Jr.	81	US	Screenwriter	The Fighting Sullivans; Maisie
April	7	Chester Erskine	77	US	Screenwriter, Director	A Girl in Every Port; The Egg and I
April	13	Stephen Stucker	38	US	Actor	Airplane!; Trading Places
April	15	Tim McIntire	41	US	Actor	Brubaker; American Hot Wax
April	20	Max Benedict	66	Austria	Film Editor	Whistle Down the Wind; The Blue Max
April	21	Marjorie Eaton	85	US	Actress	The Trouble with Angels; That Forsyte Woman
April	23	Harold Arlen	81	US	Composer	The Wizard of Oz; A Star Is Born
April	23	Otto Preminger	80	Austria	Director, Producer, Actor	Anatomy of a Murder; Laura
April	26	Broderick Crawford	74	US	Actor	All the King's Men; Born Yesterday
April	26	Bessie Love	87	US	Actress	The Broadway Melody; The Lost World
April	30	Robert Stevenson	81	UK	Director	Mary Poppins; Old Yeller
May	1	Hylda Baker	81	UK	Actress	Saturday Night and Sunday Morning; Oliver!
May	3	Robert Alda	72	US	Actor	Rhapsody in Blue; Imitation of Life
May	9	Herschel Bernardi	62	US	Actor	The Front; Irma la Douce
May	12	Elisabeth Bergner	88	Ukraine	Actress	Escape Me Never; Paris Calling
May	13	George Gaines	52	US	Set Decorator	All the President's Men; Heaven Can Wait
May	22	Martin Gabel	73	US	Actor	The Front Page; Marnie
May	23	Sterling Hayden	70	US	Actor	The Godfather; Dr. Strangelove
May	24	Yakima Canutt	90	US	Actor, Stuntman, Director	Stagecoach; Ben-Hur
May	26	Gunnar Björnstrand	74	Sweden	Actor	The Seventh Seal; Fanny and Alexander
May	28	Lurene Tuttle	78	US	Actress	Don't Bother to Knock; Psycho
May	31	Sylvia Coleridge	76	UK	Actress	Tess; I Met a Murderer
June	3	Anna Neagle	81	UK	Actress	Forever and a Day; No, No, Nanette
June	10	Paul Stevens	65	US	Actor	Advise & Consent; Battle for the Planet of the Apes
June	11	Reed De Rouen	69	UK	Actor	The Third Man; Billion Dollar Brain
June	13	Benny Goodman	77	US	Musician	A Song Is Born; The Benny Goodman Story
June	14	Alan Jay Lerner	67	US	Screenwriter, Lyricist	An American in Paris; My Fair Lady
June	17	Ted J. Kent	84	US	Film Editor	Creature from the Black Lagoon; The Wolf Man
June	20	Julie Duncan	67	US	Actress	Desperate Cargo; Wyoming Wildcat
June	23	Nigel Stock	66	UK	Actor	The Great Escape; The Lion in Winter
June	29	Robert Drivas	50	US	Actor	Cool Hand Luke; The Illustrated Man
June	30	Margalo Gillmore	89	UK	Actress	Perfect Strangers; Cause for Alarm!
July	3	Rudy Vallee	84	US	Actor, Singer	How to Succeed in Business Without Really Trying; Unfaithfully Yours
July	10	Jody Lawrance	55	US	Actress	Mask of the Avenger; Ten Tall Men
July	15	Benny Rubin	87	US	Actor	Sunny Skies; Hot Curves
July	18	Buddy Baer	71	US	Actor	Quo Vadis; The Big Sky
July	19	Daniel L. Fapp	82	US	Cinematographer	The Great Escape; West Side Story
July	19	Harold D. Schuster	83	US	Film Editor, Director	Wings of the Morning; Loophole
July	25	Vincente Minnelli	83	US	Director	An American in Paris; Gigi
July	28	John Alcott	55	UK	Cinematographer	Barry Lyndon; A Clockwork Orange
August	6	Emilio Fernández	82	Mexico	Actor, Director	María Candelaria; The Wild Bunch
August	10	Jacqueline Gadsden	86	US	Actress	Mysterious Island; The Thirteenth Hour
August	13	Helen Mack	72	US	Actress	The Son of Kong; His Girl Friday
August	15	Waldon O. Watson	79	US	Sound Engineer	Psycho; That Touch of Mink
August	19	Hermione Baddeley	79	UK	Actress	Mary Poppins; Room at the Top
August	20	Walter Brooke	71	US	Actor	Lawman; The Graduate
August	21	Bruce Cowling	66	US	Actor	Battleground; Cause for Alarm!
August	23	Adrienne Fazan	80	US	Film Editor	Singin' in the Rain; Gigi
August	26	Ted Knight	62	US	Actor	Caddyshack; Countdown
September	1	Murray Hamilton	63	US	Actor	Jaws; The Graduate
September	6	Blanche Sweet	90	US	Actress	Anna Christie; The Sporting Venus
September	8	Ray Nazarro	83	US	Director	Apache Territory; The Tougher They Come
September	15	Virginia Gregg	70	US	Actress	Operation Petticoat; Spencer's Mountain
September	26	Brian Desmond Hurst	91	Ireland	Director	Dangerous Moonlight; Scrooge
September	28	Denis Carey	77	UK	Actor	Psychomania; The Day of the Jackal
September	28	Robert Helpmann	77	Australia	Actor, Director	Chitty Chitty Bang Bang; The Red Shoes
October	5	Hal B. Wallis	88	US	Producer	Casablanca; Becket
October	11	David Hand	86	US	Animator, Director	Snow White and the Seven Dwarfs; Bambi
October	11	Boris Leven	78	Russia	Production Designer	West Side Story; The Sound of Music
October	14	Yvette Dugay	54	US	Actress	The Cimarron Kid; Francis Covers the Big Town
October	14	Keenan Wynn	70	US	Actor	Dr. Strangelove; Nashville
October	14	Spec O'Donnell	75	US	Actor	Here's Flash Casey; Blonde Trouble
October	17	Leah Rhodes	84	US	Costume Designer	The Big Sleep; Strangers on a Train
October	25	Forrest Tucker	67	US	Actor	Sands of Iwo Jima; The Yearling
October	28	Robert Arthur	76	US	Producer	The Big Heat; Father Goose
October	28	Ian Marter	42	UK	Actor	The Medusa Touch; The Abominable Dr. Phibes
October	31	Marcella Martin	70	US	Actress	Gone with the Wind; The Man Who Returned to Life
November	2	Harry Brown	69	US	Screenwriter	A Place in the Sun; Ocean's 11
November	8	Beatrice Kay	79	US	Singer, Actress	Diamond Horseshoe; Underworld U.S.A.
November	11	Roger C. Carmel	54	US	Actor	Gambit; Breezy
November	21	Jerry Colonna	82	US	Actor	Alice in Wonderland; Road to Singapore
November	21	Dar Robinson	39	US	Stuntman	To Live and Die in L.A.; Papillon
November	22	Scatman Crothers	76	US	Actor	The Shining; Twilight Zone: The Movie
November	23	Norman Maurer	60	US	Producer	The Three Stooges Meet Hercules; Who's Minding the Mint?
November	27	Robert Priestley	85	US	Set Decorator	Picnic; Sayonara
November	29	Herb Vigran	76	US	Actor	20,000 Leagues Under the Sea; The Love Bug
November	29	Cary Grant	82	UK	Actor	North by Northwest; To Catch a Thief
December	1	Frank McCarthy	74	US	Producer	Patton; Decision Before Dawn
December	2	Ken Scott	58	US	Actor	Fantastic Voyage; The Three Faces of Eve
December	2	Desi Arnaz	69	Cuba	Actor, Singer	The Long, Long Trailer; Holiday in Havana
December	10	Susan Cabot	59	US	Actress	Gunsmoke; Tomahawk
December	11	Carlos Ramirez	70	Colombia	Actor, Singer	Anchors Aweigh; Night and Day
December	12	Clifford Stine	80	US	Cinematographer	This Island Earth; Follow Me, Boys!
December	13	Heather Angel	77	UK	Actress	Alice in Wonderland; Peter Pan
December	18	George Amy	83	US	Film Editor	Yankee Doodle Dandy; Air Force
December	18	Mamo Clark	72	US	Actress	Mutiny on the Bounty; Hawaii Calls
December	22	Harvey Stephens	85	US	Actor	Sergeant York; North by Northwest
December	23	Gerhard Bienert	88	Germany	Actor	The Blue Angel; The Testament of Dr. Mabuse
December	26	Elsa Lanchester	84	UK	Actress	Bride of Frankenstein; Witness for the Prosecution
December	28	Andrei Tarkovsky	54	Russia	Director, Screenwriter	Solaris; Andrei Rublev

== Film debuts ==
- Brenda Bakke – Last Resort
- Angela Bassett – F/X
- Michael Beach – Streets of Gold
- Sean Bean – Caravaggio
- Ewen Bremner – Heavenly Pursuits
- Dan Castellaneta – Nothing in Common
- Kim Coates – The Boy in Blue
- Margaret Colin – Pretty in Pink
- Maddie Corman – Seven Minutes in Heaven
- Antoni Corone – Band of the Hand
- Brett Cullen – Stewardess School
- Béatrice Dalle – Betty Blue
- Andrew Divoff – Neon Maniacs
- Adrian Dunbar – Sky Bandits
- Dale Dye – Invaders from Mars
- Carmen Ejogo – Absolute Beginners
- Dave Foley – High Stakes
- Kevin Gage – SpaceCamp
- Ariadna Gil – Lola
- Annabeth Gish – Desert Bloom
- Tony Goldwyn – Friday the 13th Part VI: Jason Lives
- Caroline Goodall – Every Time We Say Goodbye
- Paul Guilfoyle – Howard the Duck
- Tim Guinee – Tai-Pan
- Marcia Gay Harden – The Imagemaker
- Lauren Holly – Seven Minutes in Heaven
- Catherine Keener – About Last Night
- Richard Kind – Nothing in Common
- Robert Knepper – That's Life!
- Jeff Kober – Out of Bounds
- Olek Krupa – 91/2 Weeks
- James LeGros – The Ladies Club
- Ted Levine – One More Saturday Night
- Robyn Lively – The Best of Times
- Jennifer Lopez – My Little Girl
- Jon Lovitz – Hamburger: The Motion Picture
- Kelly Lynch – Portfolio
- Natasha Lyonne – Heartburn
- John C. McGinley – Sweet Liberty
- Janet McTeer – Half Moon Street
- Ben Mendelsohn – The Still Point
- Penelope Ann Miller – Hotshot
- Rob Moran – Quiet Cool
- Mark Moses – Platoon
- Joel Murray – One Crazy Summer
- Ajay Naidu – Touch and Go
- Claire Nebout – Scene of the Crime
- Jerry O'Connell – Stand by Me
- Kevin J. O'Connor – Peggy Sue Got Married
- Miranda Otto – Emma's War
- Adrian Pasdar – Top Gun
- Jason Patric – Solarbabies
- Vincent Perez – Gardien de la nuit
- Elizabeth Perkins – About Last Night
- Max Perlich – Ferris Bueller's Day Off
- Joaquin Phoenix – SpaceCamp
- Wendell Pierce – The Money Pit
- Jeremy Piven – Lucas
- Jason Priestley – The Boy Who Could Fly
- Bill Pullman – Ruthless People
- Francesco Quinn – Platoon
- Shiva Rajkumar – Anand
- Keanu Reeves – Youngblood
- Ving Rhames – Native Son
- Mark Rolston – Aliens
- Michael Rooker – Henry: Portrait of a Serial Killer
- Vyto Ruginis – 8 Million Ways to Die
- Tim Russ – Crossroads
- Winona Ryder – Lucas
- Aitana Sánchez-Gijón – Romanza final
- Kristin Scott Thomas – Under the Cherry Moon
- Nestor Serrano – The Money Pit
- Tony Shalhoub – Heartburn
- Jamey Sheridan – Jumpin' Jack Flash
- Nina Siemaszko – One More Saturday Night
- Ione Skye – River's Edge
- Wesley Snipes – Wildcats
- Kevin Spacey – Heartburn
- Imelda Staunton – Comrades
- Brenda Strong – Weekend Warriors
- Kristy Swanson – Pretty in Pink
- D.B. Sweeney – Power
- Tilda Swinton – Caravaggio
- Cary-Hiroyuki Tagawa – Armed Response
- Marshall Teague – Vendetta
- Robin Thomas – About Last Night
- Billy Bob Thornton – Hunter's Blood
- Tony Todd – Sleepwalk
- Tamlyn Tomita – The Karate Kid Part II
- Jacob Vargas – Last Resort
- Maribel Verdú – El orden cómico
- Paul Walker – Monster in the Closet
- Naomi Watts – For Love Alone
- Bradley Whitford – Doorman
- Michael Shamus Wiles – Terror at Tenkiller
- Billy Wirth – Seven Minutes in Heaven
- BD Wong – The Karate Kid Part II
- Robin Wright – Hollywood Vice Squad
- Kari Wuhrer – Fire with Fire
