= Alessio Puccio =

Italian voice actor (born 1986)

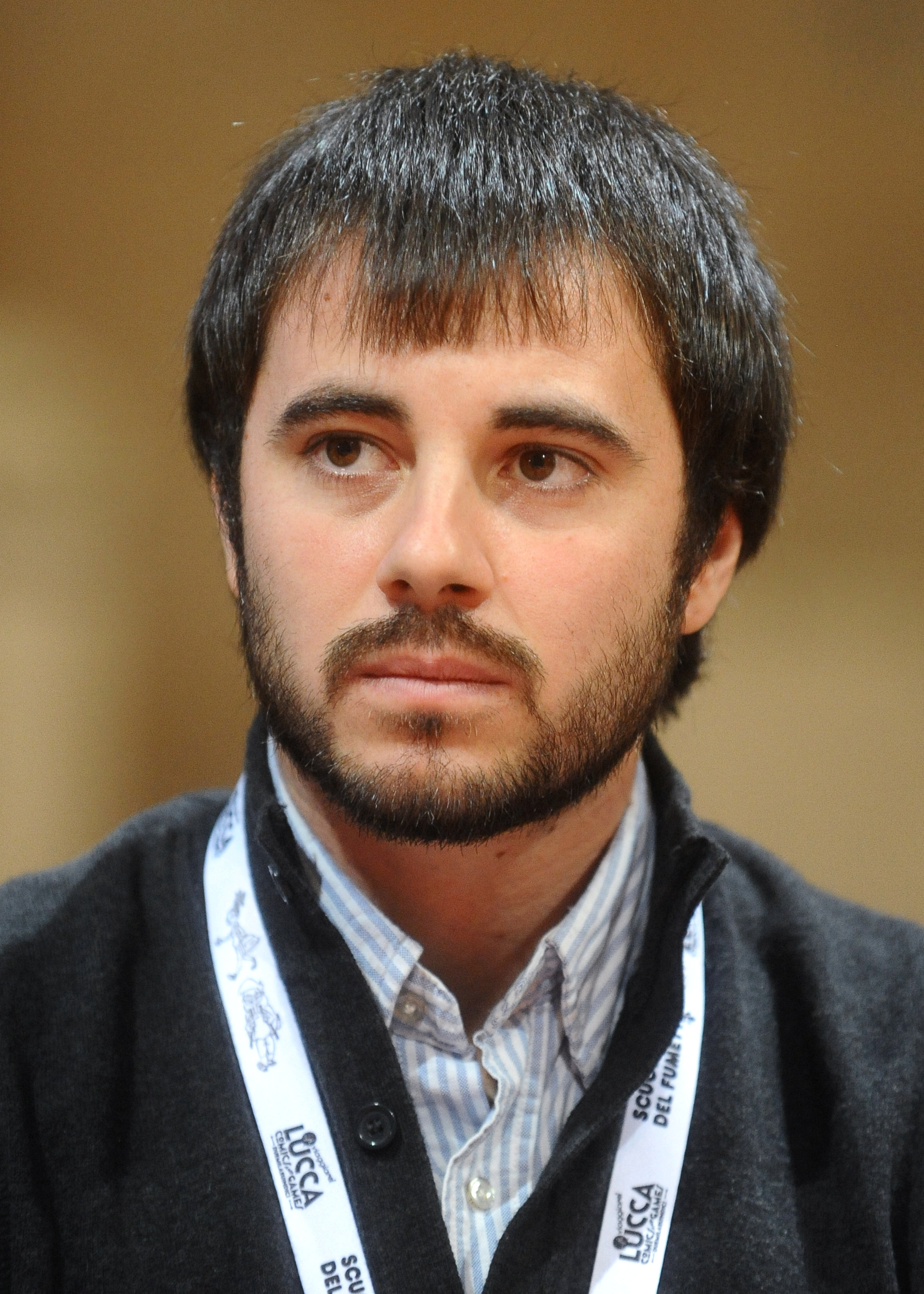
- Alessio Puccio at Lucca Comics & Games 2015
- Born: 1 June 1986 (age 40); Rome, Italy
- Occupations: Voice actor Dubbing director

Alessio Puccio (born 1 June 1986) is an Italian voice actor and dubbing director.

== Biography ==
Puccio is well known for providing the voice of the protagonist Harry Potter in the Italian-language version of the Harry Potter film series. He also provides the voice of the secondary character Jeremy Johnson in the Italian-language version of the Disney Channel animated series Phineas and Ferb. He is also the current voice of Gumball Watterson in the Italian-language version of The Amazing World of Gumball.

He works at Pumaisdue, Sefit – CDC and other dubbing studios in Italy.

== Voice work ==
- Rubio in I magicanti e i tre elementi
- Giga in PopPixie
- Spugna in World of Winx

=== Dubbing roles ===
==== Animation ====
- Jeremy Johnson in Phineas and Ferb
- Jeremy-2 in Phineas and Ferb the Movie: Across the 2nd Dimension
- Sota Higurashi in InuYasha
- Gon Freecss in Hunter × Hunter (2011 series)
- ApeTrully in Hero: 108
- Sho Yamato in Idaten Jump
- Ryan in The Wild
- Doowee McAdam in Sally Bollywood: Super Detective
- Pierre in The Wonderful World of Puss 'n Boots (2004 dub)
- Tina Belcher in Bob's Burgers
- Gumball Watterson in The Amazing World of Gumball
- Rivalz Cardemonde in Code Geass: Lelouch of the Rebellion
- Jacobo Jacobo in The Replacements
- Zephyr in The Hunchback of Notre Dame II
- Kicker in Transformers: Energon
- Roger Radcliffe in The Life and Times of Juniper Lee
- Pongdybory in Noonbory and the Super Seven
- Jordan Greenway in Inazuma Eleven
- Bald Man in ChalkZone
- Shinichi Izumi in Parasyte

==== Live action ====
- Harry Potter in Harry Potter and the Philosopher's Stone, Harry Potter and the Chamber of Secrets, Harry Potter and the Prisoner of Azkaban, Harry Potter and the Goblet of Fire, Harry Potter and the Order of the Phoenix, Harry Potter and the Half-Blood Prince, Harry Potter and the Deathly Hallows – Part 1, Harry Potter and the Deathly Hallows – Part 2
- Peter Pan in Peter Pan
- Oliver Oken in Hannah Montana
- Cisco Ramon in The Flash
- Blane Whittaker in M.I. High
- Dale Turner in Jericho
- Alan King in Jake & Blake
- George Zinavoy in The Art of Getting By
- Bobby Carter in The Hills Have Eyes
- George Little in Stuart Little
- Anakin Skywalker in Star Wars: Episode I – The Phantom Menace
- Jeremy Gilbert in The Vampire Diaries
- Benjy Fleming in Monk
- Eric van der Woodsen in Gossip Girl
- Clyde in Mean Creek
- Martin in Let the Right One In
- Rory Joseph Hennessy in 8 Simple Rules
- Michael Richard Kyle, Jr. in My Wife and Kids
- Mark in The Suite Life of Zack & Cody
- Thom in Nick & Norah's Infinite Playlist
- Mowgli in Mowgli: The New Adventures of the Jungle Book
- Calvin in I Dream
- Teddy in The Hangover Part II
- Wilder Guiliver Atticus Wilder in The Latest Buzz
- Mark Woods in Daddio
- David in A.I. Artificial Intelligence
- Forrest Gump Jr. in Forrest Gump
- Ron Stieger in Ein Fall für B.A.R.Z.
- Co-King Brady King of Kinkow in Pair of Kings
- Artie Abrams in Glee
- Paul in Boogeyman 2
- Pietros in Spartacus: Blood and Sand
- Milo in Delivering Milo
- Dylan in Modern Family
- Pete Walker in My Parents Are Aliens
- Parker Chase in Quintuplets
- Eric McGorrill in Flight 29 Down
- Allen in The Journey of Allen Strange
- Rupert Patterson in Super Rupert
- Theodore Séville in Alvin and the Chipmunks, Alvin and the Chipmunks: The Squeakquel, Alvin and the Chipmunks: Chipwrecked
- Jaskier in The Witcher
