= 2019 Bolaang Mongondow mine collapse =

- Date: 26 February 2019
- Location: Lolayan, Bolaang Mongondow, Indonesia; 0°36′N 124°18′E
- Deaths: 29

On 26 February 2019, an illegal gold mine collapsed in Bolaang Mongondow Regency, North Sulawesi, Indonesia. At least 29 people were killed and dozens more were trapped due to the collapse.

== Location ==
The mine collapse occurred at an illegal communal gold mine in Bakan village, Lolayan subdistrict, Bolaang Mongondow, North Sulawesi. The land where the mine is located is part of a concession belonging to J Resources Asia Pacific, which operates a site in the area. According to the company's management, the illegal mine had only been relatively crowded in the past few months leading to the event. Previously, in June 2018, the same mine had experienced a smaller landslide due to heavy rainfall, which killed 5 miners.

== Collapse ==
The collapse occurred around 20:30 WITA (12:30 GMT) on February 26, while tens of locals were actively mining at the site. According to accounts from rescued miners, the collapse happened due to a fracturing of the support structures of the mineshafts.

The number of people trapped in the mineshafts according to eyewitnesses varied, reaching up to more than 100 miners.

== Rescue ==
Around 140 personnel from multiple agencies were involved in the evacuation process. Early in the evacuation process, rescuers reported hearing voices of the miners who were still trapped in the shafts, with pictures of hands reaching out through small gaps in the rocks. Due to fears of triggering further landslides, in addition to the difficult and unstable terrain, rescuers initially opted to not utilize available heavy equipment and delivered drinking water to allow the miners to survive longer. Later, on 1 March, the manual rescue was halted in favor of preparing the use of heavier equipment.

As of 1 March, 8 miners had been confirmed dead and 20 had been evacuated alive from the collapsed mine. The injured survivors were brought to a hospital at Kotamobagu for treatment. On 2 March, there were believed to be over 30 miners still trapped inside the mines. By 3 March, the death toll was updated to 9 dead, with the still-to-be-found victims' families barred from the mine location to ease the evacuation.

Further searches found 20 bodies of miners buried within the site.

== Reactions ==
The provincial government of North Sulawesi remarked that the local governments had made plans to certify the communal mines to ensure compliance with safety regulations, and that the collapsed mine would not be closed, but turned into a legal mine. The Ministry of Energy and Mineral Resources responded by sending inspectors to the mine, who were also to aid in the evacuations.
