= 2019 Jayapura flood and landslide =

Natural disaster in Indonesia

- 2019 Jayapura flood and landslide (Papua (province))
- Date: 16–17 March 2019
- Location: Jayapura and Jayapura Regency, Papua, Indonesia
- Deaths: 113
- Injuries: 159
- Missing: 94

On 16 March 2019, a flash flood struck Jayapura Regency in the province of Papua, Indonesia due to torrential rain, with a separate landslide occurring in the city of Jayapura several hours later. At least 113 people were killed in the two events.

== Events ==
The flash flooding, which struck the Sentani district of Jayapura Regency, was triggered by torrential rainfall followed by landslide. The event occurred around 21:30 WIT (12:30 UTC) on 16 March, and sudden influx of water was expected to have originated from the Cyclops Mountains, which according to BNPB spokesman Sutopo Purwo Nugroho was likely caused by a landslide forming a dam blocking the headwaters of a river, which then burst resulting in the torrential flow. The floodwaters swept away with it significant amounts of material, including uprooted trees and boulders. An increase in the water depth of the local Kemiri River was reported shortly afterwards, resulting in buildings near the river being inundated. Jayapura regent Mathius Awoitauw stated that the flooding was caused by environmental damage in the Cyclops Mountains.

Separately, around 00:15 WIT on 17 March, a landslide occurred in the city of Jayapura. The second event was similarly attributed to the torrential rainfall.

== Casualties ==
By afternoon of 17 March, the Papua regional police had confirmed 70 fatalities, 63 of which were in Jayapura Regency while 7 were in the city of Jayapura. A total of 105 were confirmed to have been injured, with 75 being classified as "lightly injured" and 30 as "heavily injured". Later that day, the death toll was updated to 73, of which 66 were in the Regency, with 60 reported to be missing. The most-affected area is Sentani, where at least 51 people are reported to have been killed. Most of the victims' bodies were brought to the Bhayangkara Hospital in Jayapura for identification and collection by relatives.

On evening the following day, 89 people had been confirmed killed: 82 due to the flash flooding and 7 from the landslide. 159 injuries (84 classified as "heavy" and 75 as "light") were also confirmed, with 74 reported missing. By 19 March, the death toll was further updated to 92 dead. On Wednesday, 20 March, the death toll was further increased to 104 killed with 79 missing, and 40 of the unidentified victims were to be buried in a mass grave.

On 26 March, the death toll rose to 113.

== Impact ==
Over 11,000 people from across the regency were displaced due to the flooding, spread across 28 sites, with 11,725 households impacted across three districts. The flooding affected nine villages and damaged three bridges, submerging more than 150 houses. The administrative villages of Dobonsolo, Doyobaru and Hini Kumbi were the most affected. Papua's police recorded that 350 houses were heavily damaged, with additional damages to drainage systems and other public facilities. The Sentani–Kemiri road was blocked due to the flooding.

Sentani's Adventis Doyo airstrip was also struck by the flooding, damaging a helicopter and a Twin Otter aircraft parked there at the time of the disaster. Operations of the nearby Sentani Airport remained normal, despite its surrounding areas being impacted by the flooding. According to PLN, the transmission of around 5.2 MW of electricity was disrupted. Total damage of the flooding in Sentani topped at Rp454 billion (US$31.8 million).

== Response ==
The emergency response headquarters, which also acted as a temporary shelter, were established at the Jayapura Regent's office complex. Papua's provincial government declared a 2-week emergency response period following the disaster. Kodam XVII/Cenderawasih deployed the equivalent of 2 engineering platoons and 6 infantry companies to aid with evacuation and disaster management. In total, around 1,900 emergency workers and volunteers were deployed to the area.
