= Abu Bakar (Indonesian politician) =

Indonesian politician (1952–2019)

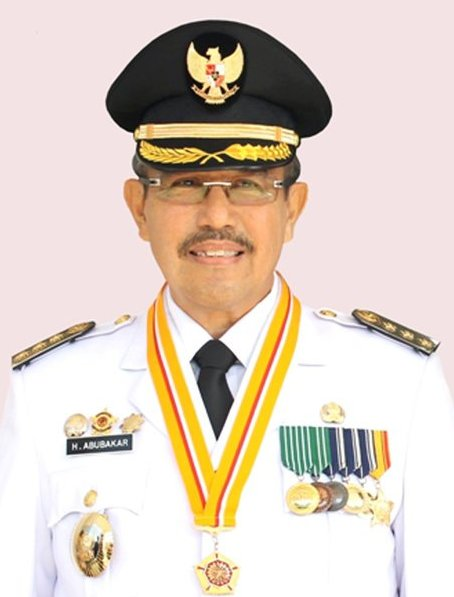
Abu Bakar (2013)

Drs. H. Abubakar, M.Si (9 December 1952 – 13 July 2019) was an Indonesian politician and regent of West Bandung.

== Biography ==
Childhood and basic education to achieve a master's degree were pursued with joy in his hometown. After completing his education at SMA 5 Bandung (1971) he continued his studies at Langlangbuana University in Bandung and obtained his bachelor's degree in 1990. While his Masters in Management was won from UNIGA in 2000. In 2018 he was arrested for bribery corruption and sentenced to 5.5 years in prison, but died a year later.
