= Titanilla Bogdányi =

Hungarian actress

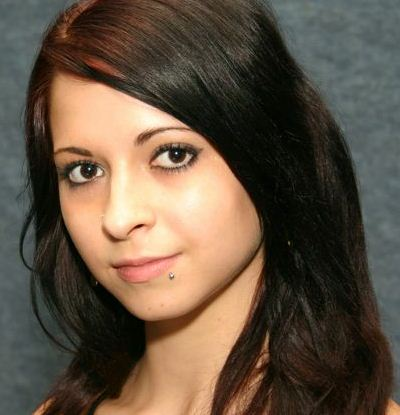
- Bogdányi in 2009
- Born: April 12, 1986 (age 40); Budapest, Hungary
- Occupation: Voice actor
- Years active: 1993–present
- Spouse: Attila Dolmány (m. 2006; div. 2008)

Titanilla Bogdányi (born April 12, 1986) is a Hungarian voice actress from Budapest.

She is well known for over-dubbing for Anne Hathaway, Miley Cyrus, Lindsay Lohan, Alexis Bledel, Jena Malone, and Dania Ramirez.

She started her career as a child in 1993.

== Over-dubbing roles ==
=== Anime and cartoons ===
- Ino Yamanaka in Naruto (Animax edition)
- Melody in The Little Mermaid II: Return to the Sea
- Zoe Drake in Dinosaur King
- Orihime Inoue in Bleach and Bleach: Memories of Nobody
- Lisa Simpson in The Simpsons and The Simpsons Movie
- Star Butterfly in Star vs. the Forces of Evil
- Izzy in Total Drama Island, Total Drama Action and Total Drama World Tour
- Gwen in Total DramaRama
- Marie in Ed, Edd n Eddy
- Taylor in Total Drama Presents: The Ridonculous Race
- Webby in Ducktales (2017)
- Aoi Kirisawa in Kilari
- Ami Onuki in Hi Hi Puffy AmiYumi
- Mary Test in Johnny Test
- Judy Jetson in The Jetsons
- Alice Gehabich in Bakugan Battle Brawlers and Bakugan Battle Brawlers: New Vestroia
- Anna Heart in Kaleido Star
- Kari McKeen in The Incredibles
- Lori Mackney in What's with Andy?
- Sango in InuYasha
- Amelia Wil Tesla Seyruun in Slayers
- Ellie in Shaman King
- Reira Serizawa in Nana
- Jasmine in Deltora Quest
- Koko in Chuggington
- Lavender in Little Charmers
- Atomic Betty/Betty Barrett in Atomic Betty
- Carmen in The Amazing World of Gumball (Season 1 only)
- Celia Hills in Inazuma Eleven
- Julia Crichton in Fullmetal Alchemist: The Sacred Star of Milosc
- Fluttershy in My Little Pony: Friendship is Magic
- Pipsqueak in The ZhuZhus
- Rudy in ChalkZone
- Gabby in Blaze and the Monster Machines

=== Live action ===
- Lois Lane in Smallville
- Vorena the Elder in Rome
- Lisette Bracho in La usurpadora
- Cat Valentine in Victorious and Sam & Cat
- Alex Russo in Wizards of Waverly Place
- Miley Stewart/Hannah Montana in Hannah Montana
- Jessie in Jessie (2011 TV series)

=== Cinema ===
- Nina in Day of the Dead
- Tia in Cars
- Pearline in Ghost Dog: The Way of the Samurai
- Suzy Bannion in Suspiria
- Julie Powell in Julie & Julia
- Go Go Tomago in Big Hero 6
- Vanellope in Wreck-It Ralph
- Joy in Inside Out and Inside Out 2
