= Saphira Indah =

Indonesian actress (1986–2019)

- Born: Saphira Indah Julianti; 26 July 1986; Bandung, West Jawa, Indonesia
- Died: 30 January 2019 (aged 32); Jakarta, Indonesia
- Other name: Shapira Indah Pochi
- Occupation: Actress
- Years active: 2003–2019
- Spouse(s): First husband (divorced) Ai Rico Hidros Daeng
- Children: Ahmad Titan At Tariq

Saphira Indah Julianti (26 July 1986 – 30 January 2019) was an Indonesian actress. In 2003 she started her career in the Indonesian film industry with the film Eiffel... I'm in Love.

Indah died on 30 January 2019, from a lung infection. She was 6 months pregnant.

== Filmography ==
=== Films ===
Year	Title	Role	Notes
2003	Eiffel... I'm in Love	Uni	Debut
2011	Virgin 3: Satu Malam Mengubah Segalanya	Dini	
2011	Poconggg Juga Pocong	Sheila	
2014	Rumah Kosong	Pembantu	
2015	Villa 603	Diana	
2018	Eiffel... I'm in Love 2	Uni	Last
2019	Uka-Uka the Movie: Nini Tulang	Sandra	Launched after her death

=== Television ===
Year	Title	Role	Notes
2004	Aku Ingin Hidup		Debut
2005	www.cinta.com	Nadine	
2012	Tendangan Si Madun		
2012	Takdir Cintaku	Niken	
2012	Layla Majnun	Ibunda Qais	5 episode
2012	Kharisma	Nirmala	9 episode
2012-2014	Raden Kian Santang	Ratu Laut/Diah Kencana Wangi	
2013	Bioskop Indonesia Premiere		Episode "Toko Kr. Amat: Gelang Tulang"
2013	Bioskop Indonesia Premiere		Episode "Pangeran Tampan Bau Ikan"
2015	Ganteng Ganteng Serigala	Bu Cindy	
2016	Sinema Pintu Taubat	Anita	Episode "Aku Tak Malu Dengan Pekerjaan Ayahku"
